= U2:UV Achtung Baby Live at Sphere =

2023–2024 concert residency by U2

- Residency by U2
- Static variation of the animated, dynamic colour logo, introduced in August 2023
- Location: Paradise, Nevada, U.S.
- Venue: Sphere
- Associated album: Achtung Baby
- Start date: 29 September 2023
- End date: 2 March 2024
- No. of shows: 40
- Attendance: 663,000
- Box office: $244.5 million

U2 concert chronology
- The Joshua Tree Tour 2019 (2019); U2:UV Achtung Baby Live at Sphere (2023–2024); The Greatest Show on Earth World Tour (2027)

U2:UV Achtung Baby Live at Sphere was a concert residency by the Irish rock band U2 that took place at Sphere in Paradise, Nevada, in the Las Vegas Valley. Consisting of 40 concerts from 29 September 2023 to 2 March 2024, the residency inaugurated the venue, with each show featuring a full performance of the group's 1991 album Achtung Baby along with a mix of other songs from their catalogue. The shows leveraged Sphere's immersive video and sound capabilities, which include a 16K resolution wraparound LED video screen measuring 160,000 square feet (15,000 m^{2}), and speakers with beamforming and wave field synthesis technologies.

The show was conceptualised over an 18-month period by U2's long-time production designer Willie Williams, in collaboration with artist and designer Es Devlin and architect Ric Lipson. Several artists were commissioned to provide video artwork for the concerts, including Devlin, Marco Brambilla, John Gerrard, and the effects studio Industrial Light & Magic. The stage featured a minimalist design in the shape of a record player, borrowed from Brian Eno's art piece "Turntable". The band's creative team faced numerous challenges while developing the show, which included tailoring it to a venue with brand-new technology while it was still being built, designing a video playback system suitable for the high-resolution screen, and sharing the space with the crew for Darren Aronofsky's film Postcard from Earth.

First rumoured in July 2022, the residency was announced in a Super Bowl LVII television advertisement in February 2023, followed by date confirmations and ticket sales in April and May. To promote the residency, U2 released a Las Vegas-themed single on opening night called "Atomic City", and a temporary exhibit for fans was created at the Venetian resort that adjoins Sphere. U2's drummer Larry Mullen Jr. did not participate in the residency in order to recuperate from surgery, marking the first time since 1978 that the group performed without him; Dutch drummer Bram van den Berg from the band Krezip filled in.

U2:UV Achtung Baby Live received wide critical acclaim. Many reviews highlighted the successful fusion of U2's anthemic music with the spectacle of the venue, while commenting on the show's potential impact on live entertainment as a whole. Initially scheduled to run until December 2023 for 25 shows, the residency was extended into March 2024 with 15 additional concerts due to high demand. The residency grossed $244.5 million from 663,000 tickets sold, making it the fourth-highest-grossing concert residency of all time. It was filmed for the immersive concert film V-U2, which began screening exclusively at Sphere in September 2024.

== Background ==
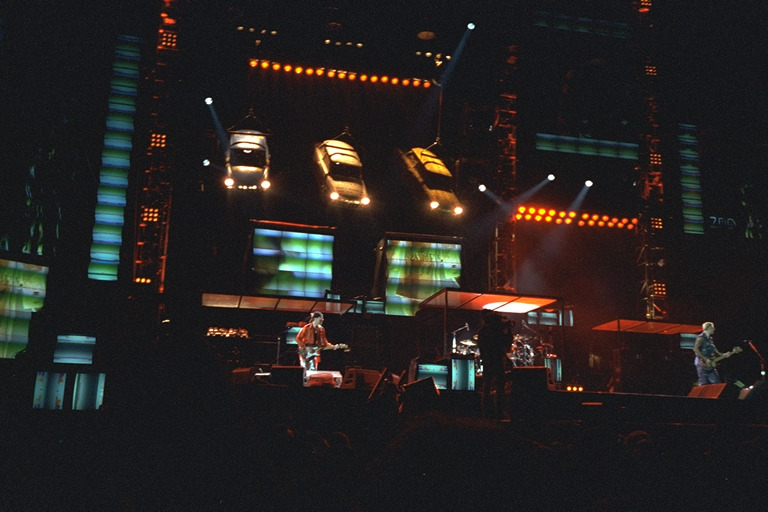
U2 performing in May 1993 on the Zoo TV Tour, in support of their 1991 album Achtung Baby

In 1991, the Irish rock band U2 released their seventh studio album, Achtung Baby, which was critically acclaimed and sold 18 million copies. The supporting Zoo TV Tour from 1992 to 1993 was a multimedia spectacle intended to instill sensory overload in the audience, and it featured dozens of video screens, Trabant automobiles in the lighting system, and a belly dancer. As Achtung Baby's 30th anniversary approached in 2021, the band contemplated if they should commemorate the milestone while the COVID-19 pandemic was still ongoing; they considered the possibility of staging concerts, similar to their 2017 and 2019 tours that commemorated the 30th anniversary of their 1987 album The Joshua Tree. For U2's bassist Adam Clayton, their biggest question was: "how do you update the Zoo TV concept? Because all the predictions of Zoo TV have come to pass: fake news, media overload, the MTV generation, wars fought on television with camera systems that could follow a missile down the street, as it was in the Iraq-Kuwait war at that time. So we just thought: we can't take this out [on the road]."

The live entertainment venue Sphere was announced in February 2018 as a joint project between the Madison Square Garden (MSG) Company and Las Vegas Sands Corporation. The venue was marketed for its potential to immerse audiences with revolutionary sound and video capabilities. Measuring 366 feet (112 m) high and 516 feet (157 m) wide at its broadest point, Sphere is located just off the Las Vegas Strip, east of the Venetian, which was owned by Las Vegas Sands at the onset of the project. Groundbreaking on Sphere took place in September 2018 with expectations that it would open in 2021. In March 2020, MSG Entertainment announced that construction was being halted due to the pandemic. By August, the company said that construction had resumed and that Sphere's opening had been postponed until 2023. The venue was originally estimated to cost between US$1.2 billion and US$1.7 billion, but by the time construction was completed, costs had risen to US$2.3 billion.

== Booking ==
According to U2's guitarist the Edge, the band first heard about Sphere in 2020 from friends involved with the project and through their creative team, as they wanted to stay informed about technological advancements for concerts, particularly regarding live audio. He said, "We got the feeling that amongst the Sphere team, we'd been identified as prime candidates for the job of opening the venue." Concert promoter Peter Shapiro, who was a producer for the band's concert film U2 3D, first approached their lead vocalist Bono in autumn 2021 with the idea of U2 inaugurating Sphere.

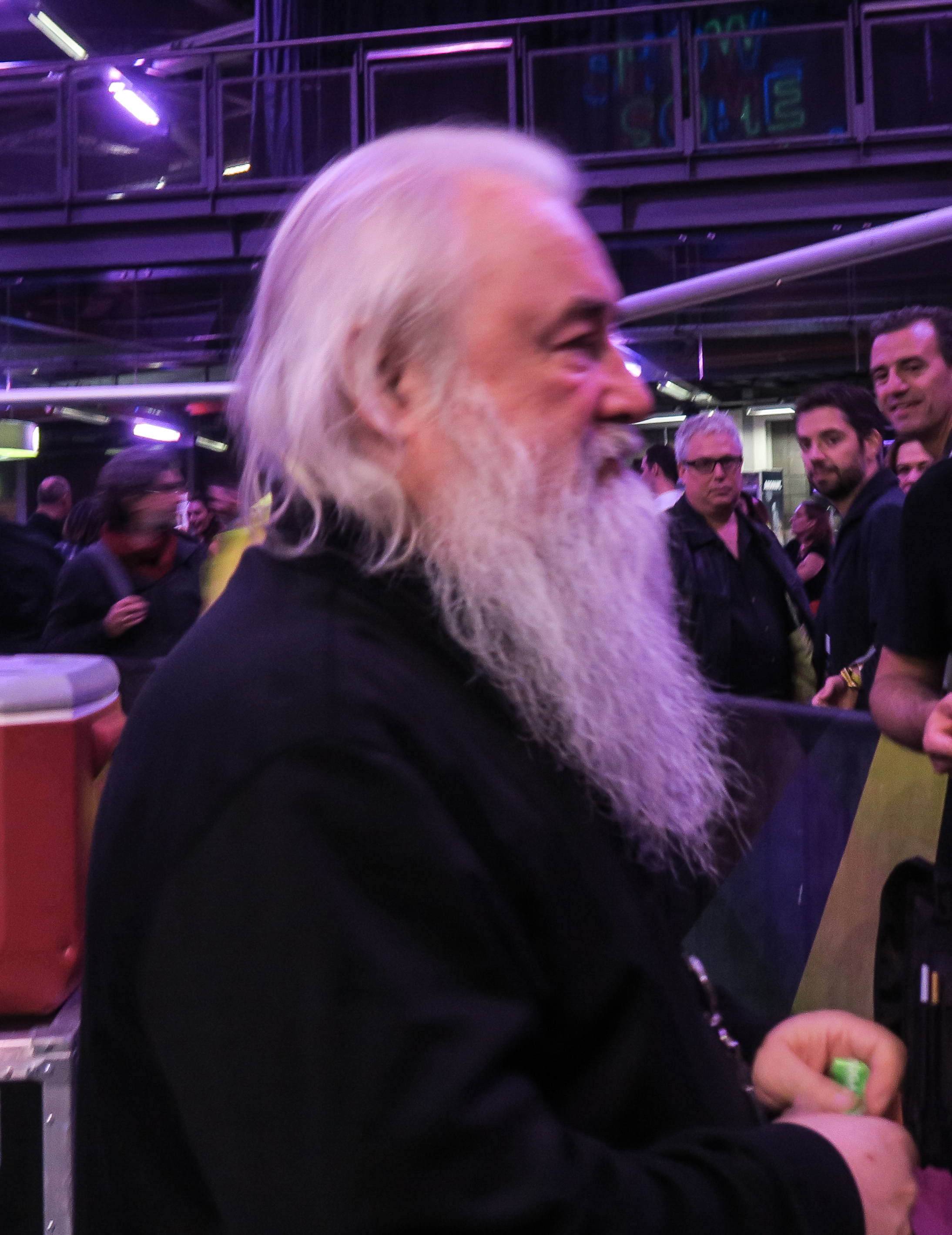
Before U2 agreed to the residency, their sound engineer Joe O'Herlihy was tasked with learning about Sphere's speaker system.

From conversations with Shapiro and MSG Entertainment chief executive James L. Dolan, Bono learned about the immersive sound system that the German company Holoplot was designing for the venue. Bono subsequently called the band's long-time sound engineer Joe O'Herlihy in August 2021 and tasked him with learning more about it. O'Herlihy travelled to Germany to participate in a demonstration of the speaker system at Congress Center, an industrial exhibition hall in Leipzig. He tested the speakers with multitrack recordings he had brought from U2's Joshua Tree Tour 2019, and was immediately struck by the "intelligibility of Bono's voice". O'Herlihy originally intended to visit for only a day but was so enthused that he stayed for an entire week to learn as much as he could about Holoplot's system. By the time he left, he was convinced that it was the "future of [his] industry", and he told Bono and the Edge that they "definitely [had] to be the first band into the Sphere".

After being unofficially asked if U2 would consider opening Sphere, Bono and the Edge visited the half-built venue as well as Sphere Studios, a quarter-scale replica of the venue in Burbank, California, for a demonstration of Sphere's eventual sound and video capabilities. The duo left the meeting excited but their creative team disabused them of the idea that designing a show would be easy. Michael Rapino, the CEO of Live Nation Entertainment, unsuccessfully tried to dissuade Bono from opening Sphere, fearing that the venue's LED screen could make U2's audiences queasy. Interest in a potential show that would commemorate Achtung Baby coalesced around the idea of not touring a complex concert production in the post-COVID era. Negotiations with U2 subsequently began in earnest in early 2022.

Initially, there were discussions about inaugurating the venue with American rock band Phish, with whom Dolan and MSG Entertainment have a long-standing relationship; Phish's guitarist Trey Anastasio was the first performer to utilise the "Sphere Immersive Sound" system during his August 2022 shows at the MSG Entertainment-owned Beacon Theatre in New York City. Ultimately, U2 agreed to open Sphere with a concert residency, followed by Phish. Dolan reportedly paid U2 $10 million to produce their show, on top of their guaranteed earnings of $4 million per show from Live Nation. The deal was arranged by entertainment executive Irving Azoff and his son Jeffrey of Full Stop Management. Irving Azoff has a business partnership with MSG Entertainment and helped Dolan secure the plot of land on which Sphere was built. Azoff also became U2's manager in 2022, succeeding Guy Oseary after his nine-year tenure as their manager. Azoff said at the beginning of the residency that U2's contract included an option for them to continue performing at Sphere for two more years.

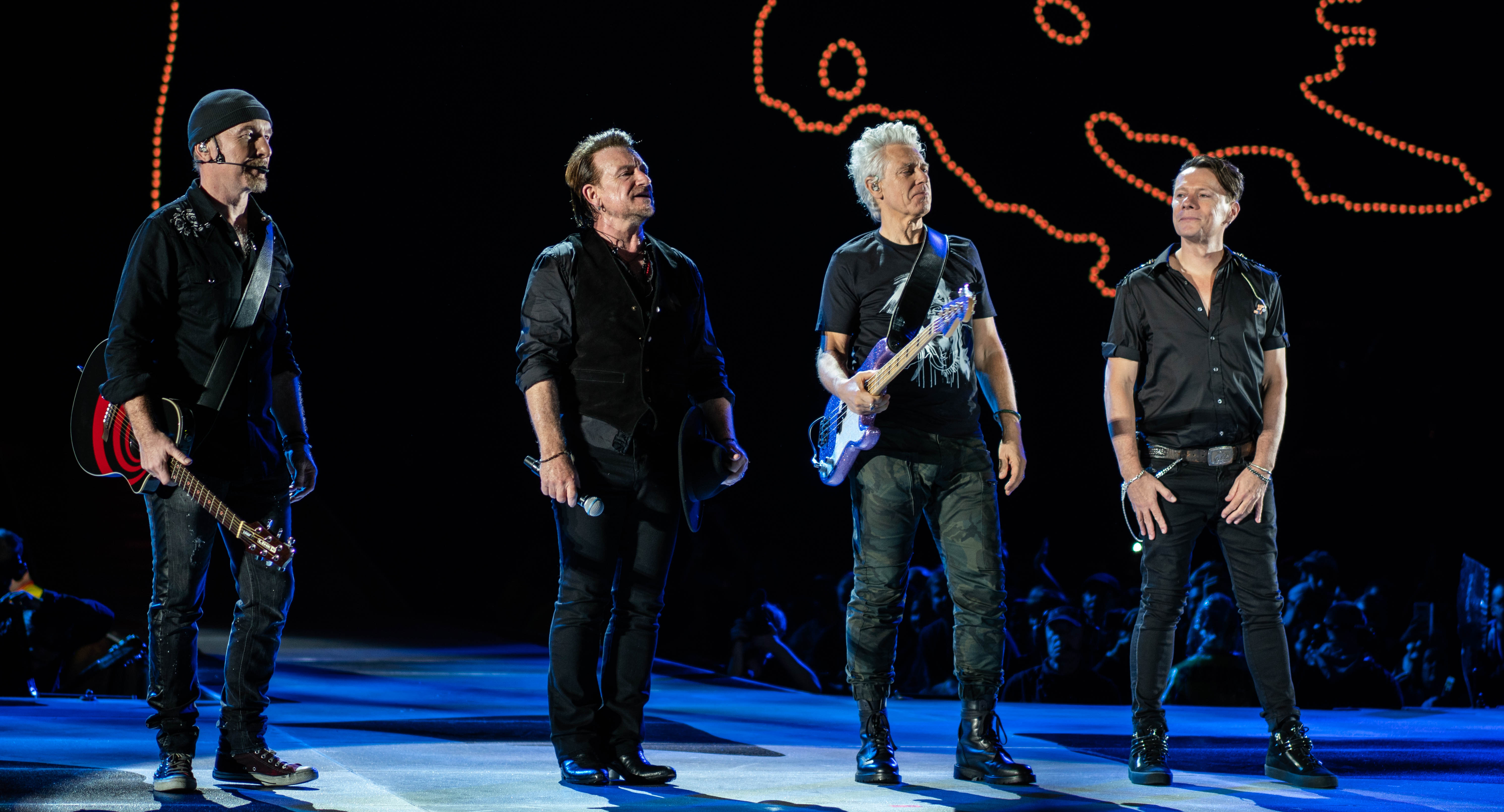
The residency was U2's first time performing live since the Joshua Tree Tour 2019 (pictured). Drummer Larry Mullen Jr. (right) sat out the Sphere shows to recuperate from surgery.

The group agreed to the residency despite their drummer Larry Mullen Jr. dealing with long-standing pain from a congenital fusion of a facet joint in his neck. A few weeks after Mullen committed, his physiotherapist told him that he would be physically unable to make it through rehearsals and that he needed to withdraw. Mullen hinted at the situation in November 2022, saying that he needed surgery to continue performing because he had "lots of bits falling off, elbows, knees, neck", and that if the band performed in 2023, it would likely be without him. Ultimately, the band were unable to reschedule the shows; the Edge said, "We made a commitment." Mullen supported his bandmates' decision to continue without him, saying in 2026: "I absolutely understood. Business is business, and nothing can get in the way of the process, and I accept that 100 percent." In need of a temporary replacement, U2 hired the Dutch drummer Bram van den Berg of the band Krezip, having been previously introduced to him by the Dutch DJ Martin Garrix.

== Development ==
=== Assembling production team ===
In early 2022, Bono presented the idea for a U2 residency at Sphere to their long-time production designer Willie Williams. Initially, Williams thought "it was a terrible idea". From a personal standpoint, he said that he hated Las Vegas, calling it a dark, cynical, and expensive city and "the place rock n' roll comes to die". From a practical perspective, he was also sceptical about tailoring a U2 show to a specific venue with new technical requirements. In his prior experiences with the band, the creative team always started with their ideas before selecting the equipment that could help them realise those ideas; for Sphere, he found it odd that they would need to take the reverse approach by starting with an unfinished venue and its hardware as the only givens.

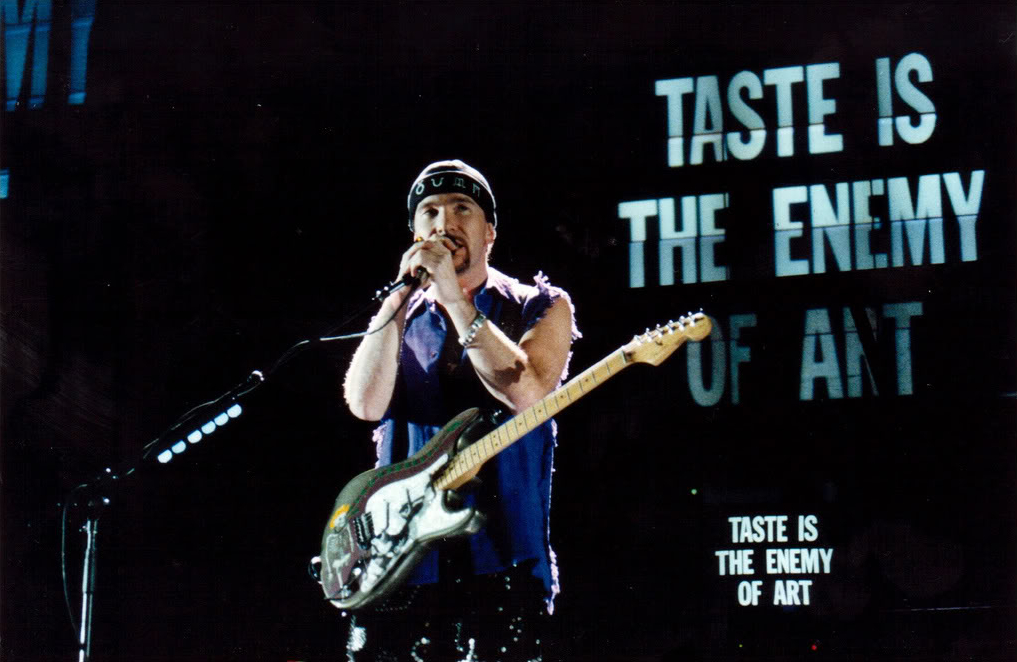

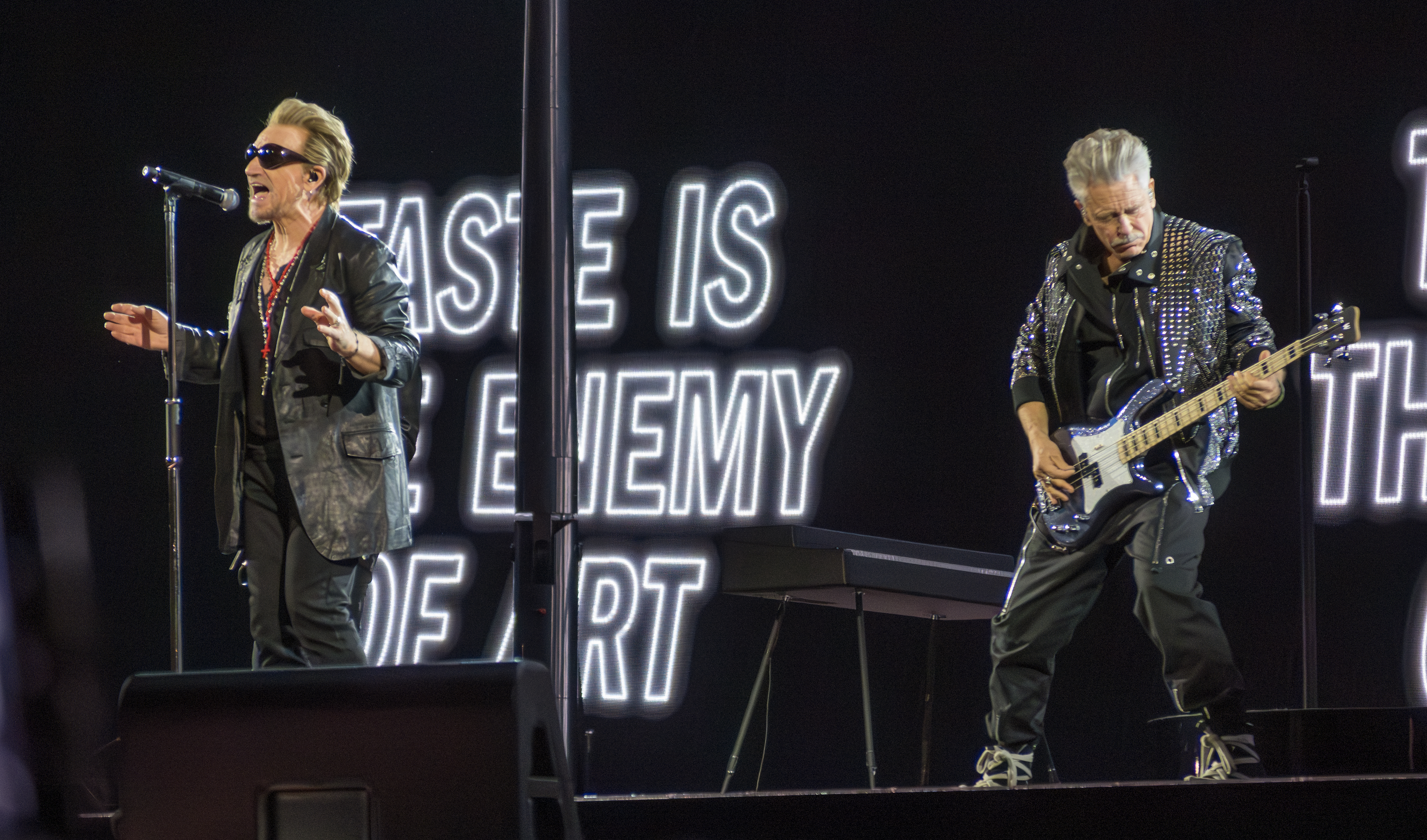
Despite his initial reservations, production designer Willie Williams referenced U2's Zoo TV Tour (top, in 1993) for their Sphere residency (bottom, in 2024).

Williams was also unsure whether the proposed show should reference the Zoo TV Tour, as he believed that its multimedia spectacle had become ubiquitous over the following 30 years. He said: "The Zoo TV video confessional basically is TikTok. So I felt like that language has probably played out. Every show out there looks like a cross between Zoo TV and [U2's 1997 tour] PopMart... and I wasn't sure there was much more water in that well." Ultimately, he was convinced to take on the project after reflecting on the band's 2017 and 2019 Joshua Tree anniversary tours, which he thought avoided nostalgia by presenting the album in a contemporary way as if it was their latest release. He decided he could mirror this approach for an Achtung Baby anniversary show and focus on the album rather than the Zoo TV Tour. Williams highlighted certain visual elements from the tour that had not been as widely replicated, with the goal of recreating its overall atmosphere.

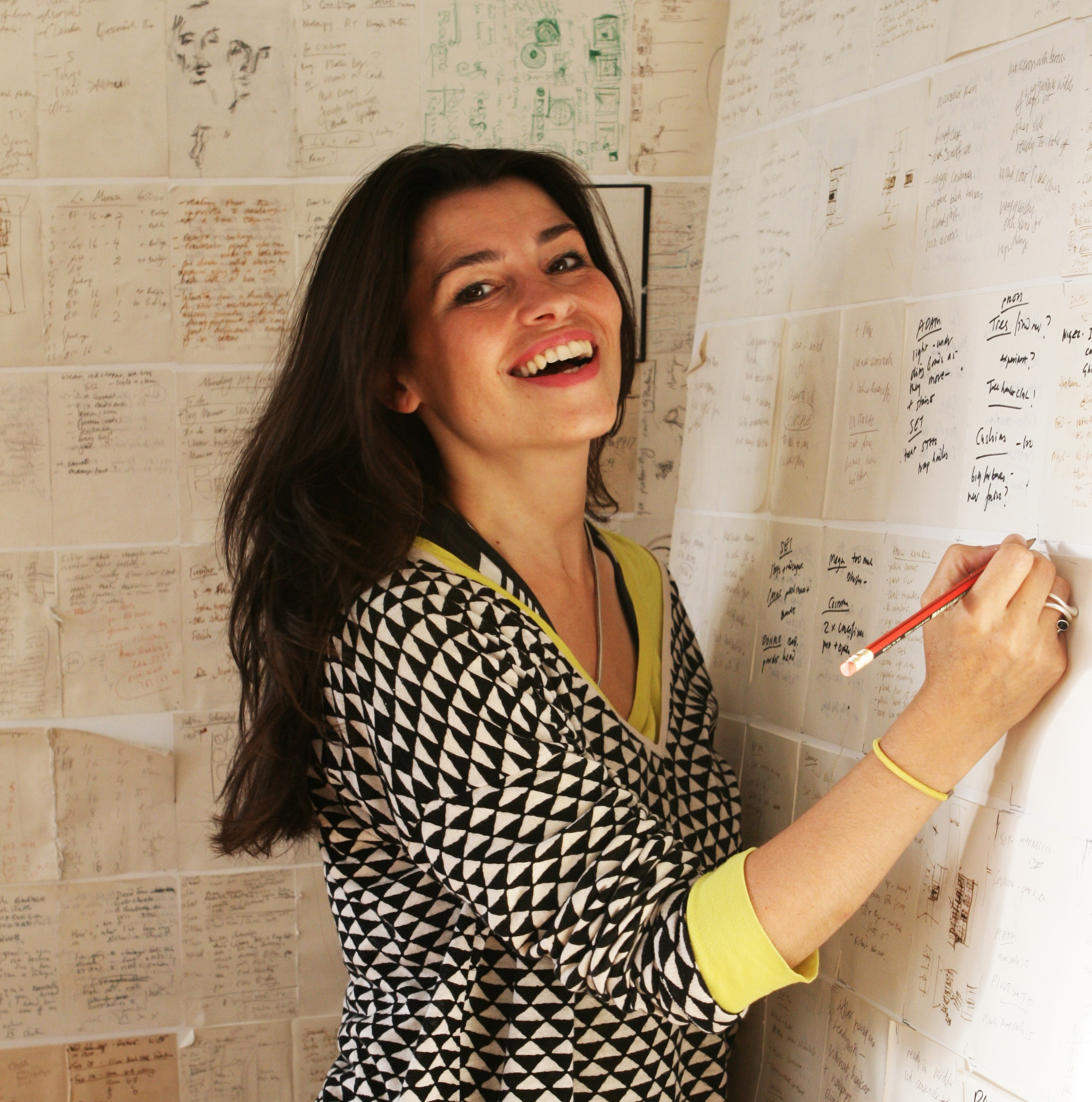
Es Devlin, a member of U2's creative team

Williams began by engaging stage designer and artist Es Devlin, who worked on the band's 2015 Innocence + Experience Tour, and Ric Lipson of the architectural firm Stufish, forming the core of the band's creative team. Williams made the early decision to bring all the band's collaborators to Las Vegas, with nearly his entire team relocating temporarily to the city. Many crew members from prior U2 tours were involved in the production, including Stefaan "Smasher" Desmedt, U2's long-time technical and video director and the creative technical director of the live production rental agency Fuse Technical Group. After Williams convinced him to come out of retirement in August 2022 to work on Bono's 2022–2023 "Stories of Surrender" theatre shows, Desmedt subsequently agreed to work on U2's Sphere residency as well; his son Matisse programmed the shows' visuals. Joining Stefaan Desmedt for the video and camera direction were Allen Branton and Felix Peralta; Williams previously worked with Desmedt and Branton on the 1993 filming of U2's concert video Zoo TV: Live from Sydney. For the lighting team, Williams reunited lighting directors Alex Murphy and Ethan Weber, who previously worked together on U2's 360° Tour, and he added Matt Beecher, who served as lighting director on the "Stories of Surrender" shows. Long-time U2 producers Brian Eno and Steve Lillywhite also served as advisers.

=== Creative discussions, show structure, and themes ===
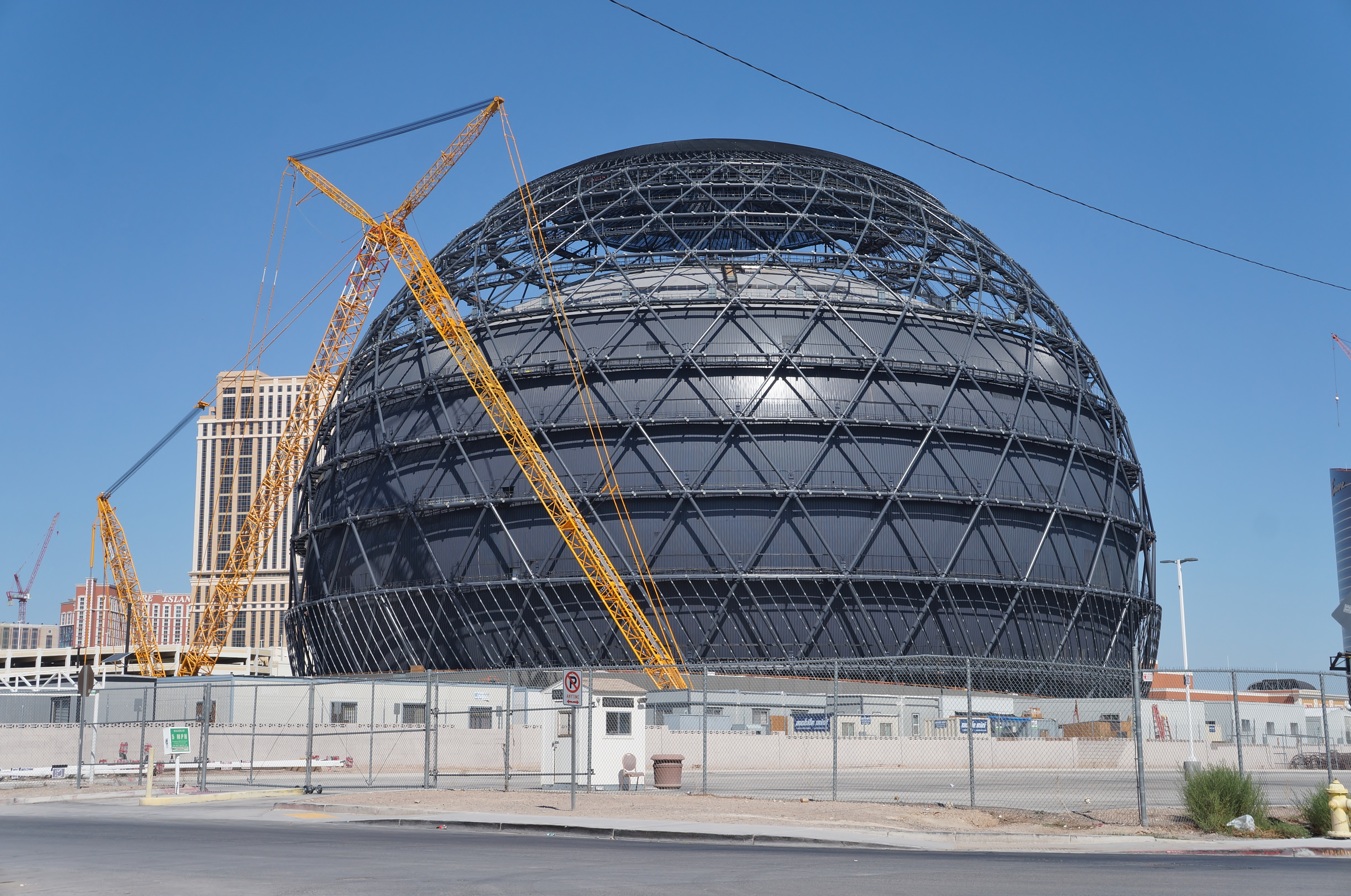
Sphere under construction in September 2022. U2's creative team felt challenged in designing the show while the venue was still being built.

To design the show, Williams collaborated with Devlin and Lipson. Williams said the band's creative team typically operated like a think tank and would begin by discussing ideas they had since they last designed a show. For the Sphere concerts, the trio began by trying to brainstorm a new type of show and its supporting visual concepts, while imagining what the physical space of the venue would be like. Describing the challenge it posed to the team, Williams said: "The journey was extraordinarily uphill. Because, of course, the building didn't exist when we were conceiving the show. So not only did we have to conceive the show, we had to conceive the building as well". The creative team developed storyboards and held creative discussions over several months, during which they engaged U2. Williams explained to them that they were "making an ocean liner not a dinghy", and that once they had decided on a direction, they would not be able to shift course quickly due to the production's heavy dependencies on video. Williams said the creative team wanted the Sphere production to be "as much a digital art collaboration as it was a rock show". He likened the task of producing the show to creating the "biggest art project in the history of our species whilst running a three-legged obstacle course".

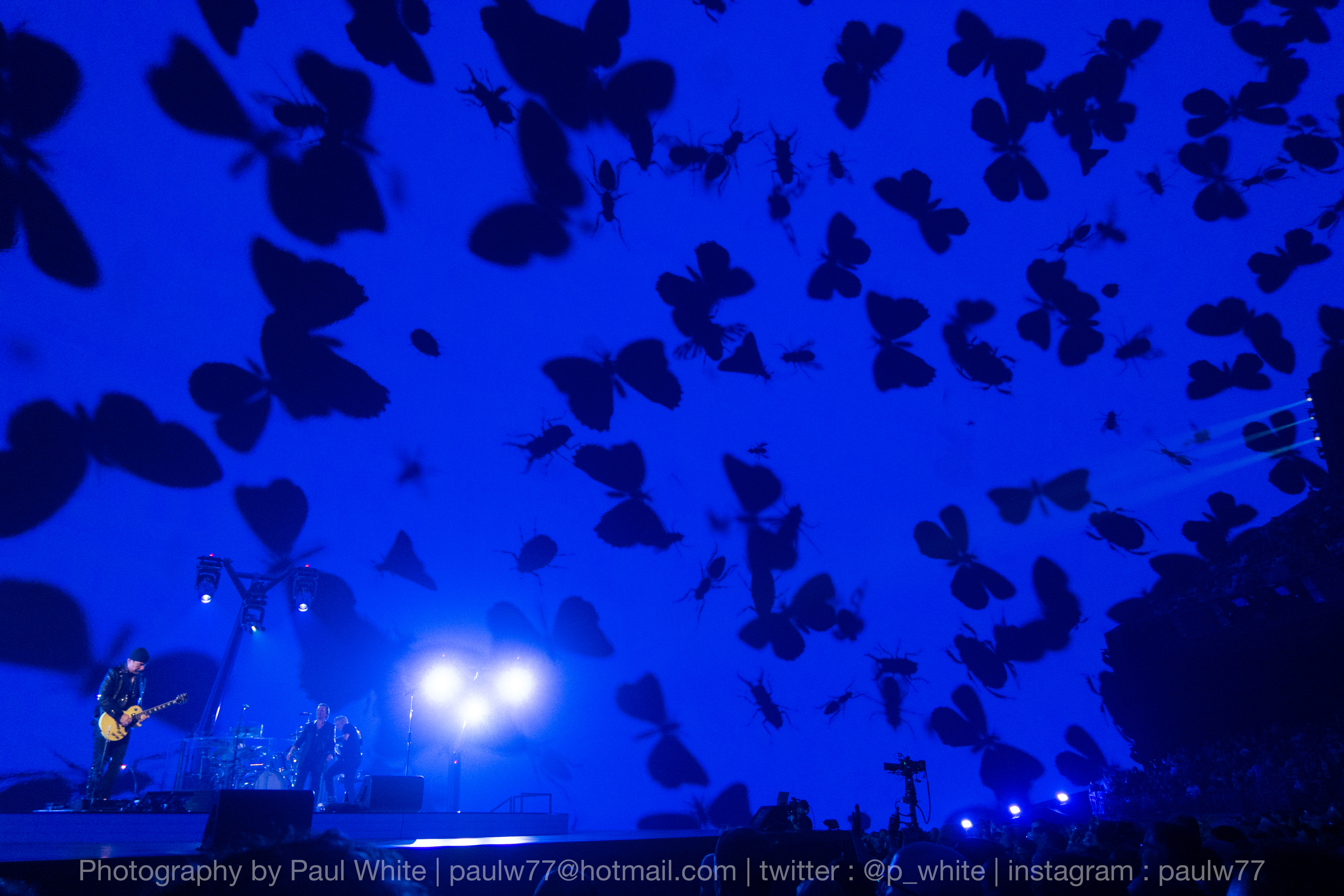
Williams had a creative breakthrough after realising simple visuals like those pictured could be just as effective as hyperreal ones.

Clayton said that despite the band being presented with demos of Sphere's immersive capabilities ahead of time, the creative team had eight months of pre-production work to complete before they would even have access to the venue. Most demonstrations that were conducted at Sphere and Sphere Studios focused on high-resolution outdoor photography. Williams had an epiphany in February 2023 that very simple graphics could be effective on a screen as large as Sphere's because it does not have any corners to act as points of reference. He said: "when I started playing with very simple graphic things, I realized that your brain has no sense of where the visual plane is. And not only are there no corners, but we could introduce virtual corners and shapes of our own and your brain absolutely buys it". Consequently, he decided that he would leave the nature photography to Sphere's other opening feature, the Darren Aronofsky film Postcard from Earth. Williams was further inspired to create visual illusions on screen after observing U2's willingness to allow their audience to be briefly engrossed by visuals before refocusing the show on the musical performance. Williams soon settled on a three-act structure to the show: a 21st century continuation of Zoo TV with overwhelming visuals; an acoustic segment to provide a break from them and focus on U2's performances; and a cinematic section that would turn attention to the outside world.

Williams ultimately spent 18 months conceptualising the U2:UV Achtung Baby Live show. The resulting theme was the conflicting relationship that exists between consumerism and climate change, providing a commentary on humans' relationship with the natural world. Clayton acknowledged the theme was subtle and said the artists had created a narrative embodying "the idea of community" and that people were equally part of the problem and the solution. The Edge said that the theme was not the result of an intentional decision but rather how the creative process evolved.

=== Production of video artwork ===
Williams's design agency Treatment Studio was tasked with producing all video content for the residency. While the majority of it was produced in-house, artists such as Devlin, Marco Brambilla, and John Gerrard were commissioned to contribute video based on existing works of theirs, although they had to be recreated for Sphere's high-resolution screen.

Devlin's sequence "Nevada Ark" is based on her 2022 art installation Come Home Again at Tate Modern, for which she drew 243 of London's endangered species. After seeing the piece, Bono contacted her and asked if she would adapt it for U2's residency in Nevada; the result was a sequence featuring 26 of the state's endangered species. Pieces from Gerrard's "Flag" series, titled "Flare" and "Surrender", were reproduced for the residency, using the Unigine 3D game engine. For another sequence, Bono wanted the LED screen to depict the exterior surroundings of Sphere and create the illusion that the building had disappeared; to realise his idea, a team of 20 artists at the visual effects studio Industrial Light & Magic worked for four months on a computer-generated recreation of the Las Vegas skyline.

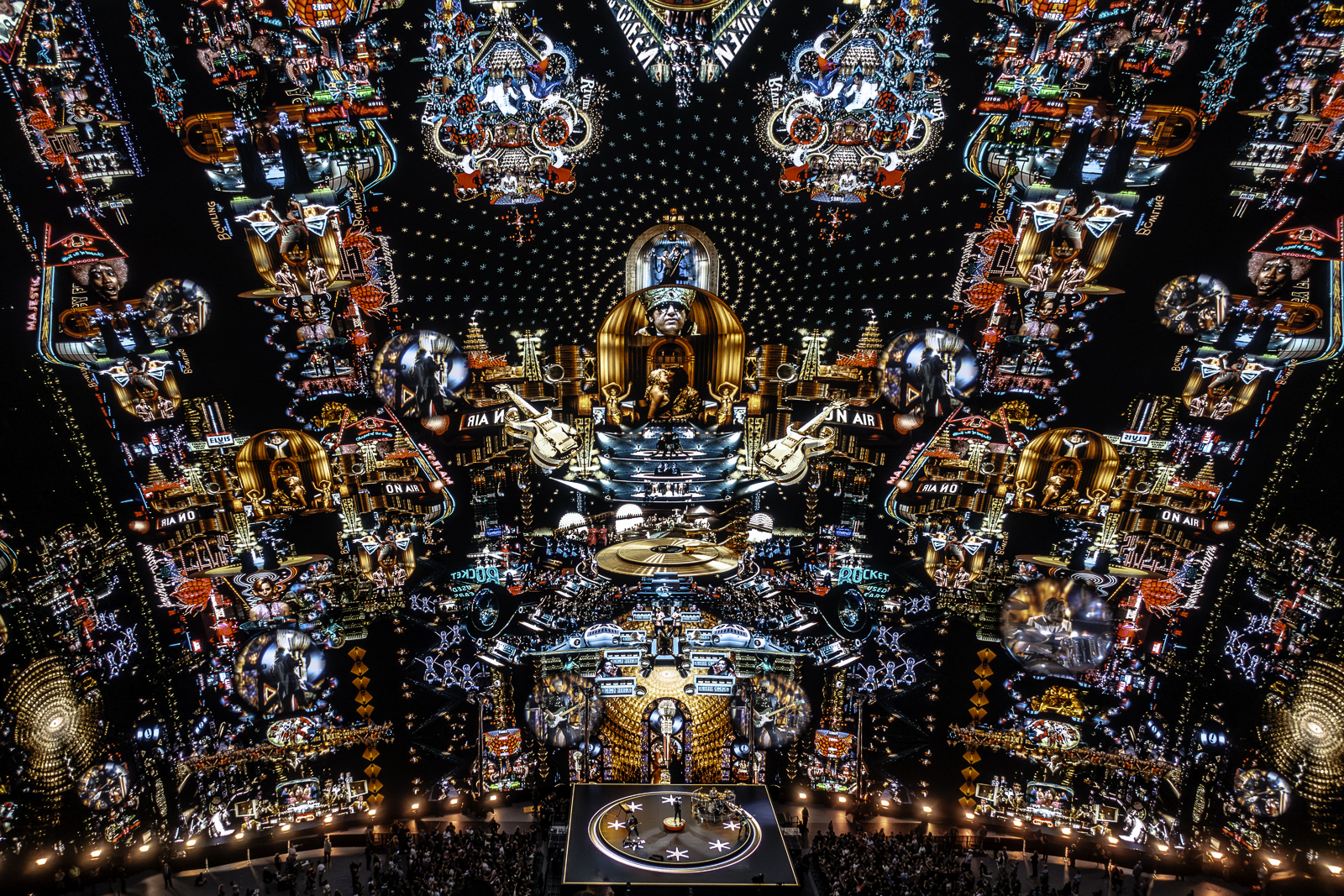
Artist Marco Brambilla designed the kaleidoscopic imagery for his sequence "King Size" with the help of artificial intelligence.

Brambilla was commissioned for the residency after Williams saw his video collage "Heaven's Gate" at Outernet London in early 2023. For U2's show, Brambilla spent three-and-a-half months creating the sequence "King Size" that featured a kaleidoscopic collage of 1,000 looped video clips depicting Elvis Presley and various Las Vegas iconography. Brambilla was asked to produce visuals that would instill sensory overload in the audience, and from conversations with Bono, he developed the themes of representing the death of Presley, the birth of Las Vegas, and their parallels with the American Dream. Brambilla trained the artificial intelligence model Stable Diffusion to categorise his personal library of over 12,000 film clips, many of them from Presley's filmography. He then used Stable Diffusion, along with the text-to-image models DALL-E and Midjourney, to create "fantastical exaggerations" of Presley based on text prompts.

=== Video playback and rendering challenges ===
The high resolution of the interior LED screen posed several challenges, the biggest of which was building a video playback system that was suitable for live concerts, according to Williams. Sphere's in-house playback system, provided by 7thSense, was designed to display high-resolution films but not with a timeline-based interface that is typical in the live concert industry. Desmedt consequently engaged the firm Disguise, which had worked with U2 since their Vertigo Tour in 2005, for help building a media server system that could seamlessly integrate visuals from different sources; it needed to play pre-rendered video content (most of it created at a 12K resolution), integrate live IMAG from cameras, and render effects in real time, all in a manner more familiar to concert touring personnel. Disguise began collaborating with Fuse in February 2023, and a team of 10 people worked for six months to design the system; Desmedt served as technical director. According to him, one of his biggest challenges was working with the new SMPTE 2110 standard for transferring digital media over IP networks. Finding manufacturers that were willing to convert to the standard's 4,096 × 2,160 (DCI 4K) display resolution proved difficult. Ultimately, Disguise's GX3 media servers were selected to handle playback.

The show's high-resolution video requirements made rendering more difficult for the video artists; according to Williams, for some sequences each frame of video was initially taking 15 minutes to render. Treatment's technical lead Brandon Kraemer consequently collaborated with Desmedt, Disguise, and Fuse to design a viable workflow for the artists. Kraemer provided a pixel map to the artists to help them accurately map their video content onto the curvature of Sphere's screen. The artists developed their content using the Cinema 4D and Adobe After Effects software; for quicker prototyping, they first rendered video at a 6K resolution before gradually scaling up to a 12K resolution. To preview how the visuals would appear in Sphere once it was constructed, the artists previsualised them in Disguise's Designer software, using a digital twin of the venue. The production team also watched the content on virtual reality headsets from different vantage points in the virtual Sphere to "make sure that every seat got a good version of the content", according to Lizzie Pocock of Treatment. The Designer software also offered the artists the ability to sequence their visuals across a timeline of beats and bars, allowing rhythmic edits to be made that synchronised with the music. Since U2 needed the flexibility to play certain sections of songs longer than planned or bring guests on stage, the artists created segments of looped video that could be swapped in by the software if needed to ensure the visuals would remain in sync with the band's performance.

=== Lighting challenges ===
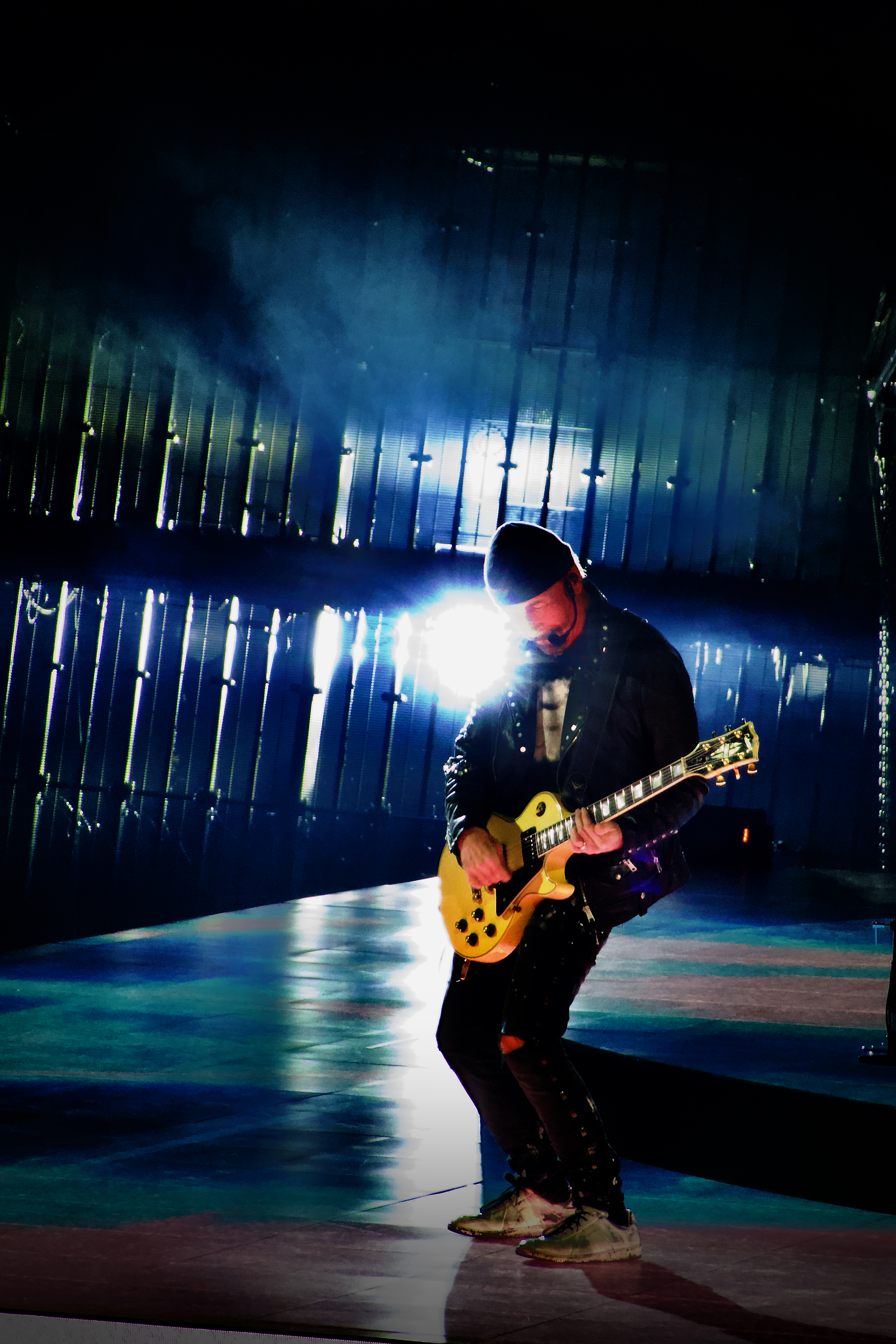
The production team faced challenges achieving sufficient backlight without relying on lights placed behind the LED screen.

Williams believed that not enough thought had been given to Sphere as a performance space when its in-house lighting system was designed. According to him, Sphere officials "looked at [him] completely blankly" when he asked about their intended solution for providing backlight. He also considered the venue's lights to be limited in their usefulness, since they are mostly positioned along the balcony rails and thus can only "provide a flat front light or point at the screen". Williams subsequently collaborated with Murphy to design a custom lighting system for U2's residency. The team faced difficulties finding a suitable location to place lights in the venue without resorting to hanging trusses that would obscure the LED screen. Though they could rig lights behind Sphere's video screen, their backlight would be insufficient and they would obstruct the on-screen visuals. Williams explored several solutions, such as scissor lifts, louvred screen panels and arches, before settling on four articulating "lampposts" that he and Lipson designed. Their design was partially inspired by pumpjacks of oil wells. To maximise visibility of the screen, Williams wanted the posts to be as thin as possible, but this came at the expense of their weight carrying capacity. As a result, the team was forced to attempt "to reinvent live entertainment with a sum total of twelve back lights". The lighting team was on site in Las Vegas about 50 days before the residency's first show in order to begin conducting their design review.

=== Rehearsals and defining sound mixes ===
In March 2023, U2 began rehearsing at Ardmore Studios in Ireland with a recreation of Sphere's immersive sound system. Joe O'Herlihy spent this time creating mixes of each song that were tailored to Sphere. The Edge told Variety the following month that the group had begun rehearsing with van den Berg as their drummer. In April, Bono departed to resume his "Stories of Surrender" book tour with an 11-show residency at the Beacon Theatre. O'Herlihy served as sound engineer for the shows and spent the month acquiring hands-on experience with the theatre's Holoplot speakers. He said the venue's setup was completely different from the one used during the band's initial rehearsals. In mid-May, U2 wrapped up their rehearsals at Ardmore Studios and began visiting Sphere Studios in Burbank. There, they began to define the setlist, while O'Herlihy used an immersive mix room to prepare his mixes. U2 and their team then moved rehearsals to Victorine Studios in Nice, France. The band worked in Studio 1, while O'Herlihy set up a grid of speakers in Studio 4 and configured his mix to have 32 destinations like they would at Sphere. The Edge said these rehearsals helped the group better understand the immersive aspect of their planned sound mix. Speaking about the final sound design for the Sphere shows, Clayton felt that the group did not need to perform very loud, which in turn forced him to concentrate more on his bass playing to "lock in".

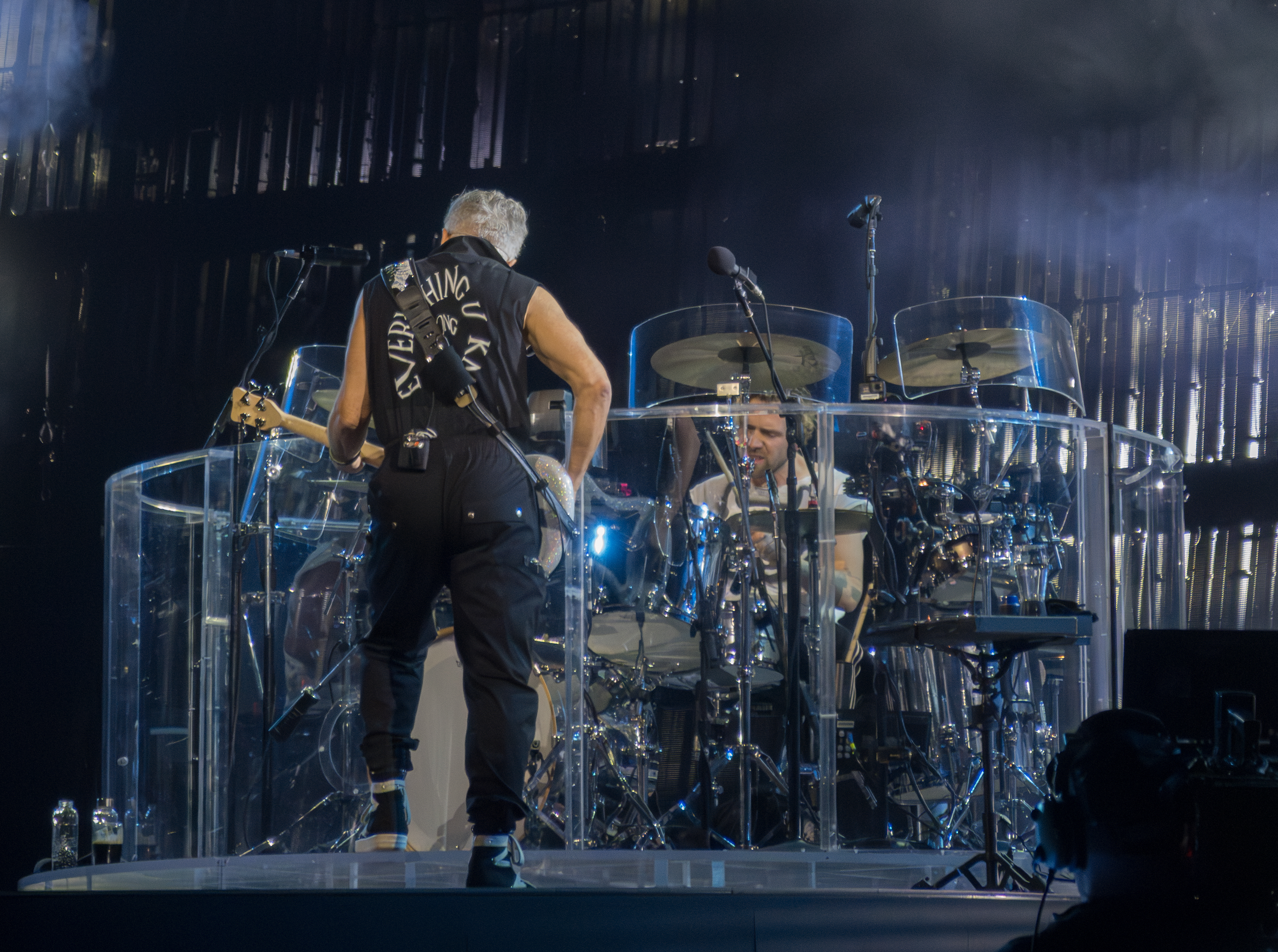
A drum screen was added to isolate the drums after a time alignment issue was discovered during on-site rehearsals.

U2's crew received access to Sphere about two months before opening night. Upon hearing the venue's speaker system for the first time, O'Herlihy was pleased to find that his sound mixes from the studio rehearsals had translated well to Sphere. As production rehearsals commenced, U2's staff had to work around the schedules of not only the venue's construction but also the Postcard from Earth crew members. Additionally, since the film would be screened on the residency's off-days, U2's crew were required to load out their stage and equipment after each group of concerts, unlike how residencies traditionally operate. As a result, the stage was designed to be rollable and have a second deck underneath for the video processing and backline equipment. Speaking about the competing schedules, Williams said that "diplomacy was by far the biggest hurdle" for the project. On 5 September, the band arrived at Sphere with their crew to begin on-site rehearsals. During this period, Williams directed the band on how to adjust their performance for the new space, saying: "They have to learn a new physicality. I keep saying to them, 'look up!', because it's an amphitheatre and a lot of the audience are up high. It's much, much more contained."

The band hired Lillywhite as a sound consultant for the residency, despite him having only one prior experience mixing live audio. The Edge said they wanted him to "give a bit more of a studio feel to the sound" due to the increased clarity of Sphere's speaker system. During soundchecks, Lillywhite detected a time alignment issue, whereby the drums could be heard acoustically from their source on stage before they were output by the speakers. To isolate their sound, a custom drum screen was created; Lillywhite said its presence on stage with the group was "one of the things that U2 hate the most". The band invited another producer of theirs, Jacknife Lee, to rehearsals in September to consult on the sound mixes. He ultimately stayed on for the residency in a multi-faceted role, performing tasks such as remixing the introduction music and creating interstitial music to play between songs.

== Announcement ==
In July 2022, Billboard first reported that U2 had agreed to perform a concert residency at Sphere for its planned opening in 2023. During a November 2022 interview with Brendan O'Connor on RTÉ One, Bono addressed the residency rumours, saying: "I can't announce Vegas, you'd have to shoot me. But if it happens, I can promise you it won't be like anything you've ever seen in Las Vegas or anywhere ever. It is the most extraordinary... If it comes off, it's grand madness by 100." Bono also said the shows would centre around Achtung Baby, which he thought they "need[ed] to really honour".

A promotional image with the residency's original branding that was used until August 2023

The concerts remained unconfirmed until 12 February 2023, when a television advertisement aired during Super Bowl LVII to officially announce the residency as "U2:UV Achtung Baby Live at the Sphere". In the advertisement, an unidentified flying object is seen hovering over several cities, which is revealed to contain a disembodied baby, and U2 fans are mysteriously transported into the desert. Journalists found the advertisement to be eerily topical, as the preceding weeks and days were marked by worldwide sightings of several unknown aerial objects.

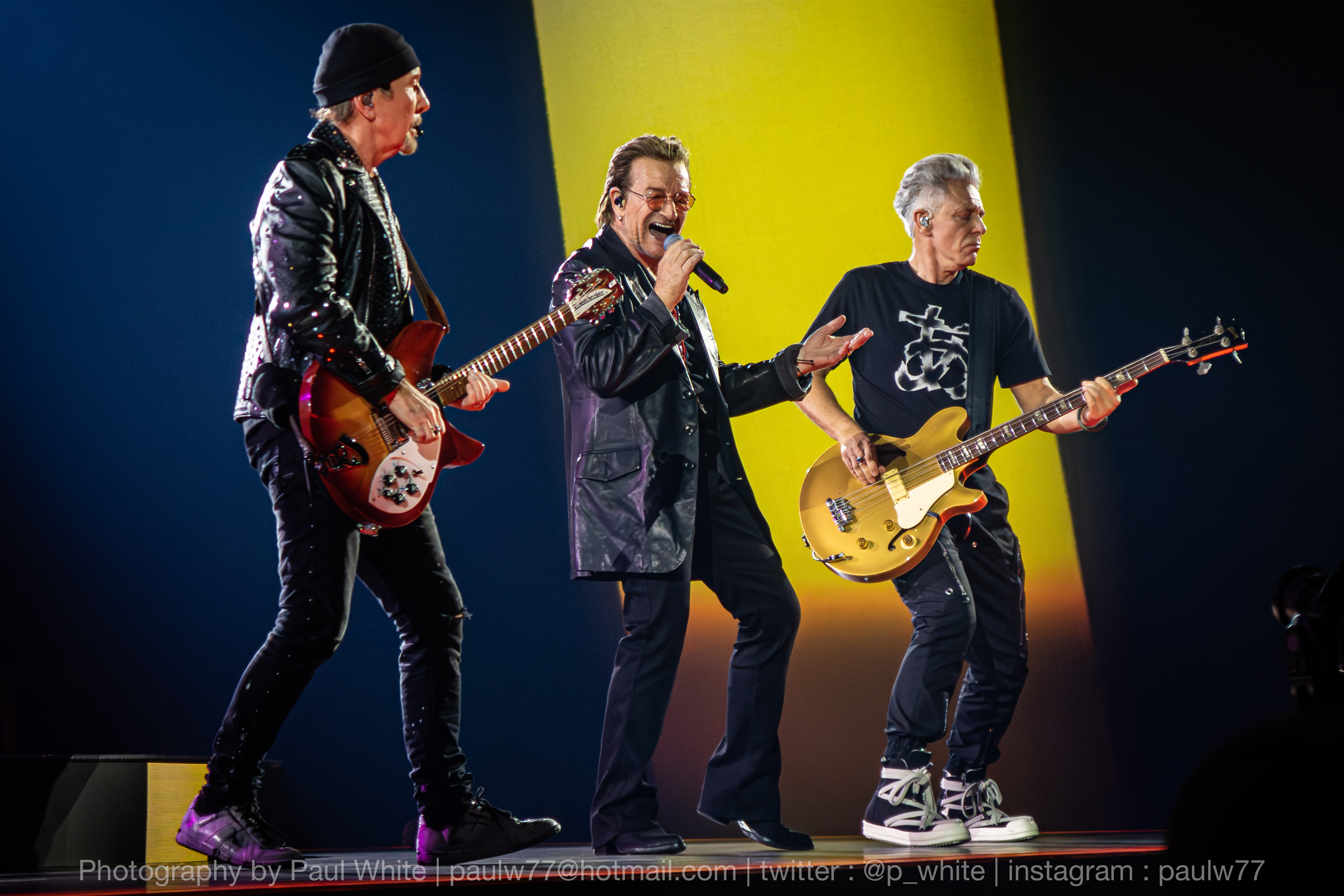
U2 members the Edge, Bono, and Adam Clayton during the opening concert of the residency

The announcement confirmed that the concerts would be focused on Achtung Baby, and that Mullen would not participate in order to recuperate from surgery. It was the first time since 1978 that U2 would perform without him; Van den Berg was announced as his temporary replacement. In a joint statement, Bono, the Edge, and Clayton said, "It's going to take all we've got to approach the Sphere without our bandmate in the drum seat, but Larry has joined us in welcoming Bram van den Berg who is a force in his own right." The statement also said, "We're the right band, Achtung Baby the right album, and the Sphere the right venue to take the live experience of music to the next level". According to journalist Neil McCormick, who has had a long-time association with U2, the announcement drew criticism from many of the group's most devoted fans. Some felt the band were being hypocritical by agreeing to perform in a city whose values did not align with the band's "image of idealism and activism", while others were "up in arms" that Mullen, a founding member of the group, would be absent.

Various media outlets called U2:UV Achtung Baby Live at Sphere a "residency", though U2's manager Irving Azoff and promoter Arthur Fogel insisted it was not a residency, and the band referred to it as a "venue launch" instead; the Pollstar Awards have defined a residency as a run of 10 or more shows at a single venue. The Edge said that he did not view it as a traditional concert residency, due to Sphere's availability limiting the amount of possible shows and because he viewed the band's motives for agreeing to the performances as creative ones. He acknowledged that Las Vegas residencies tended to be negatively perceived by some as "very show-biz", and countered that for U2: "it's the venue and it's the technology that is really the catch for us, and the hook. Because when we found out about what this venue was really offering us creatively, we just were completely intrigued. And the more we found out, we kind of saw it as a throwdown... as a challenge."

== Itinerary and ticketing ==
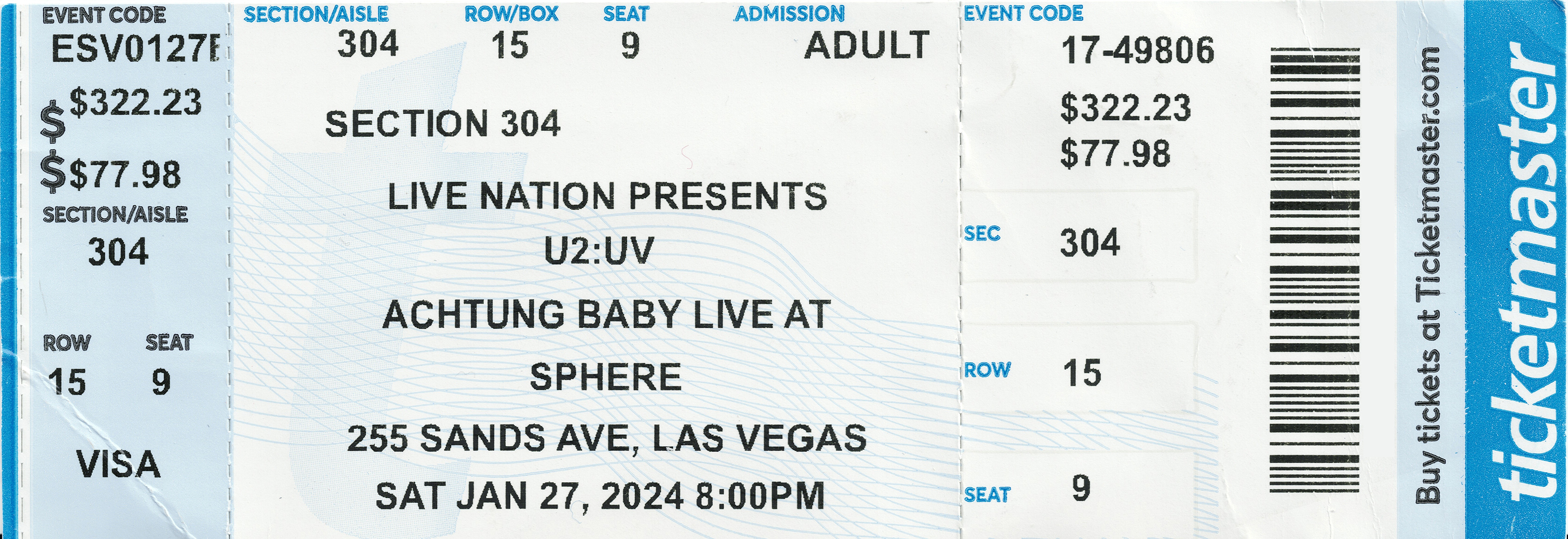
A paper ticket to one of the concerts, printed after an attendee was unable to scan their digital barcode

Concert dates and ticket sale details for U2:UV Achtung Baby Live at Sphere were first announced on 24 April 2023. Initially, five dates from 29 September to 8 October 2023 were announced. Subscribers of U2.com were offered the first opportunity to submit ticket requests via Ticketmaster Request, with a deadline of 26 April. An additional presale was announced for 27 April; to participate, fans were required to register on Ticketmaster's Verified Fan platform by 26 April and then be selected. The retailer planned to hold a general public sale of any remaining tickets on 28 April.

After a million ticket requests were submitted within the first day, on 25 April it was announced that seven concerts had been added from 11 to 25 October. Two days later, another five concerts were announced, spanning 27 October to 4 November; the announcement confirmed that only fans who had already registered on the Verified Fan platform would be eligible to participate in the presale for the newly added shows. Ultimately, presale demand for tickets was so high, Ticketmaster announced that no general public sale would take place. On 12 May, eight shows were added from 1 to 16 December, bringing the residency's length at that point to 25 concerts in 2023. Hotel packages and VIP upgrades for the concerts were sold through the hospitality firm Vibee.

Representatives for Sphere and U2 announced that 60 percent of tickets would be available for less than $300. When tickets first went on sale, prices ranged from $140 (for upper-level seats) to $500 (for lower-level seats), all-inclusive figures that already accounted for fees. Additionally, tickets for the "Red Zone", an elevated VIP section, were first offered for $600 and were limited to 50 per show; proceeds from the VIP tickets benefitted (RED), the organization co-founded by Bono to fight HIV/AIDS. Initially, the average ticket price was around $390. Rather than prices being static, dynamic pricing allowed them to fluctuate as demand changed. Within a week of tickets going on sale, seats that originally cost $140 were listed for $1,250, while the VIP tickets had increased from $600 to $6,000. During the week before the residency began, The New York Times said that prices "recently ranged from $268 to $1,240" but noted that tickets for opening night had been available from Live Nation four days beforehand and that resellers had listings for tickets below face value.

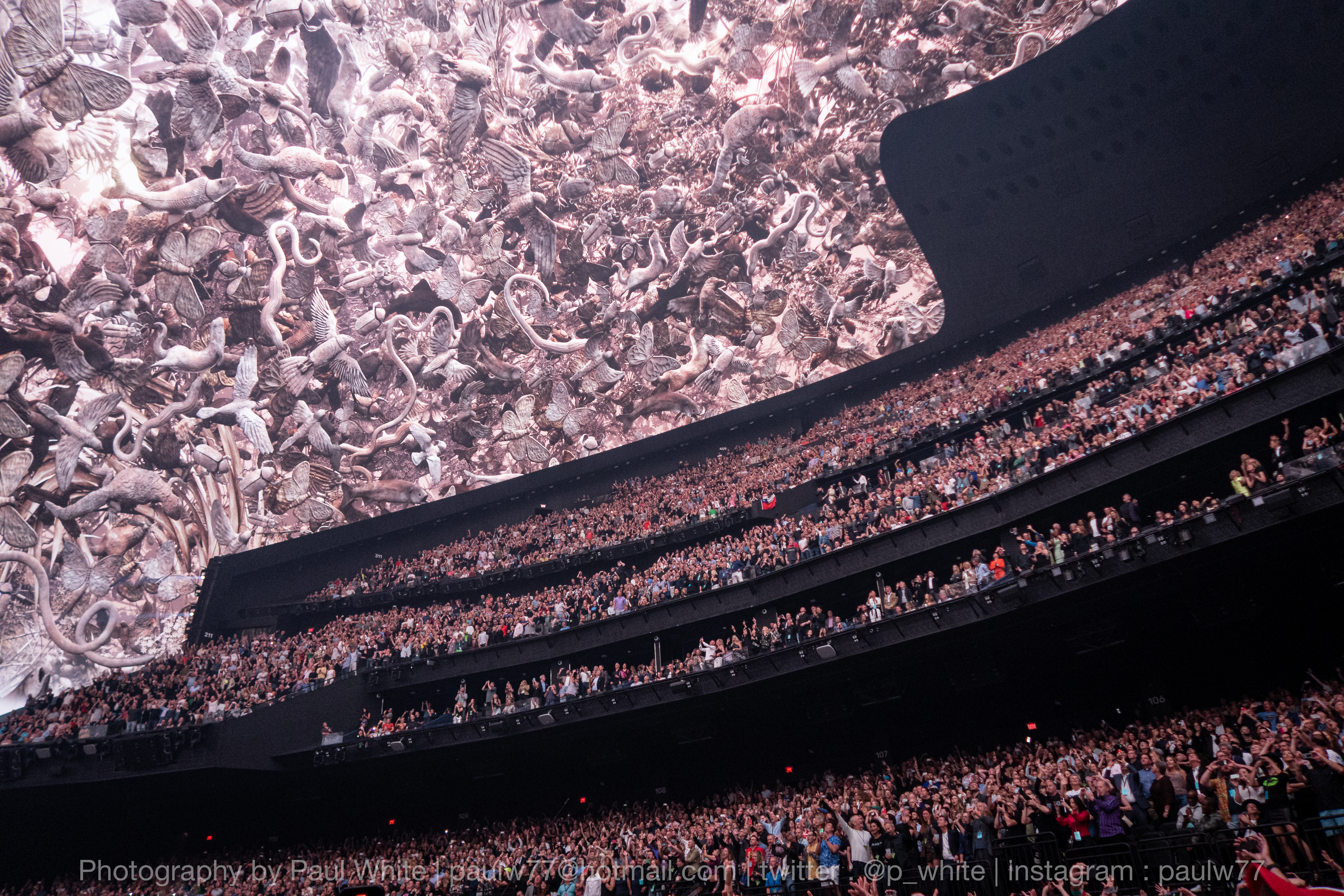
A view of the seating levels and wraparound LED screen of Sphere, as seen from the general admission area. The overhang of the second level obscures the view of the screen for some lower-level seats.

Hundreds of people who bought tickets in Sphere's premium, lower-level 100 section were informed that their seats had obstructed views of the wraparound screen due to the overhang of the second level. Approximately 800 of the venue's 17,500 seats are affected. The concert organisers offered refunds to impacted ticketholders, along with access to a presale for the December shows that offered seats with unobstructed views.

On 19 October 2023, the band announced the residency would extend into 2024 with 11 additional concerts from 26 January to 18 February, bringing the length of it at that point to 36 shows; the extension included two concerts on the weekend of Super Bowl LVIII, which was hosted nearby in the Las Vegas area. A presale for U2.com subscribers began the same day as the announcement, and a general public sale followed on 25 October.

On 1 December 2023, a special promotional sale was offered to Las Vegas area university students, wherein general admission tickets for the 2024 concerts were priced at $25 each.

U2 extended the residency for a final time by announcing on 4 December 2023 that four shows had been added, spanning 23 February to 2 March 2024. This brought the residency's total length to 40 concerts. A ticket presale for the four dates was available to U2.com subscribers through 5 December, followed by a sale to the general public that began on 8 December.

The day before the final weekend of the residency, the Las Vegas Review-Journal reported that ticket prices for the shows in the 300 level and general admission area ranged from $1,800 to $2,800 on the secondary market and Ticketmaster's resale inventory, about triple the prices they had been selling for just a week prior. The price surge also coincided with rumours that Mullen would return for the group's final two concerts.

== Stage design and show production ==
Concerts for U2:UV Achtung Baby Live leveraged Sphere's immersive video and sound capabilities.

=== Video screen ===
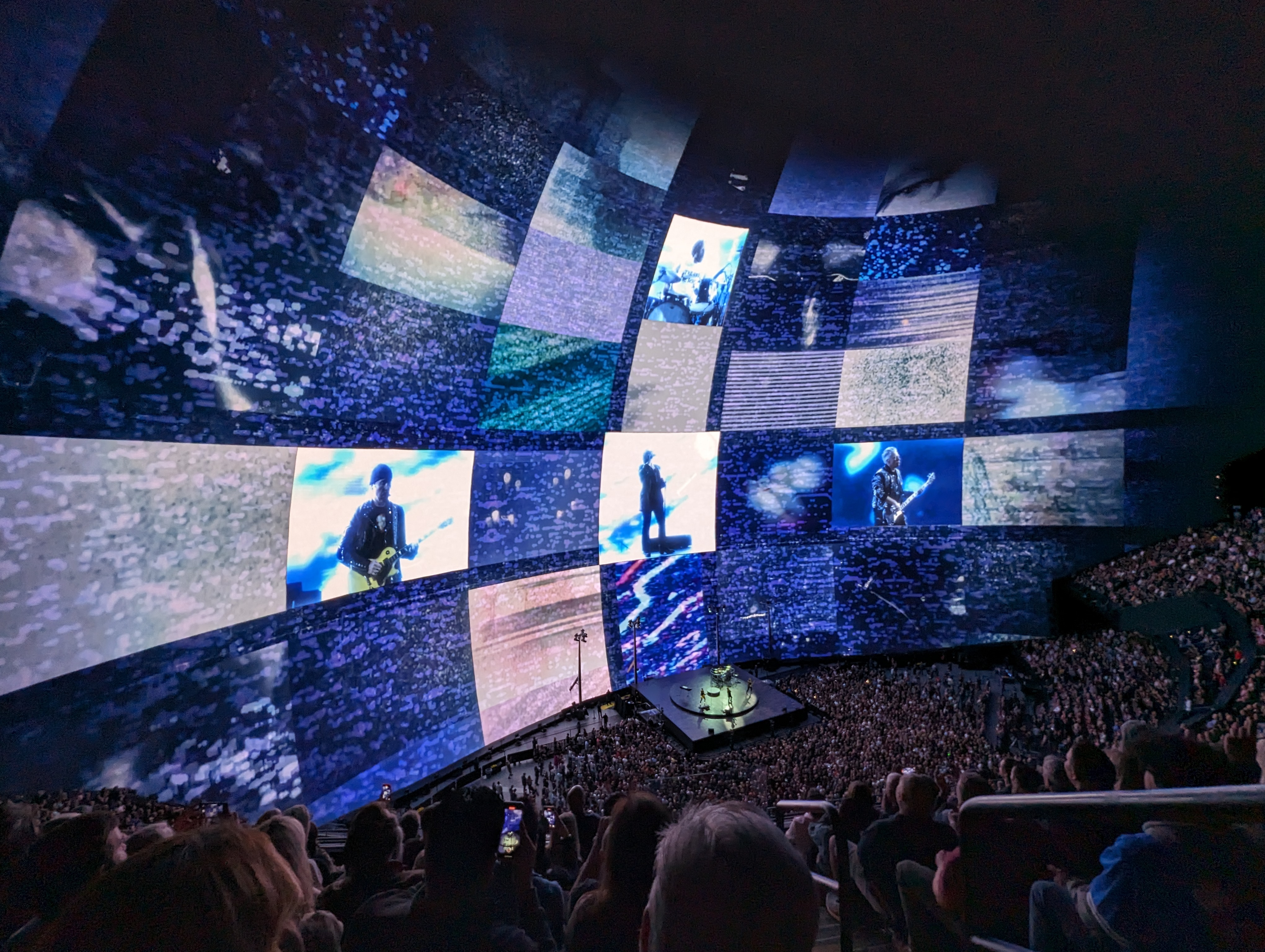
Sphere's interior LED screen measures 160,000 square feet and has a 16K resolution.

The interior of the venue is equipped with a 160,000-square-foot (15,000 m^{2}) wraparound LED screen designed and manufactured by SACO Technologies. With a 16,000 × 16,000 resolution, it is the highest-resolution LED screen in the world, according to Sphere Entertainment. In describing the number of pixels on screen, media sources have reported figures ranging from 189–254 million diodes to 268,435,456 pixels. The screen consists of 64,000 LED panels manufactured in 780 different geometric shapes, each controlled by a printed circuit board housed in an aluminum frame. The screen was designed to be acoustically transparent, allowing sound waves from the speakers mounted behind it to pass through. The building's exosphere features a 580,000-square-foot (54,000 m^{2}) LED display, the world's largest at the time the venue opened. It comprises 1.23 million puck-shaped LEDs spaced 8 inches (20 cm) apart, each containing 48 diodes.

=== Speaker system, sound design, and mixing ===
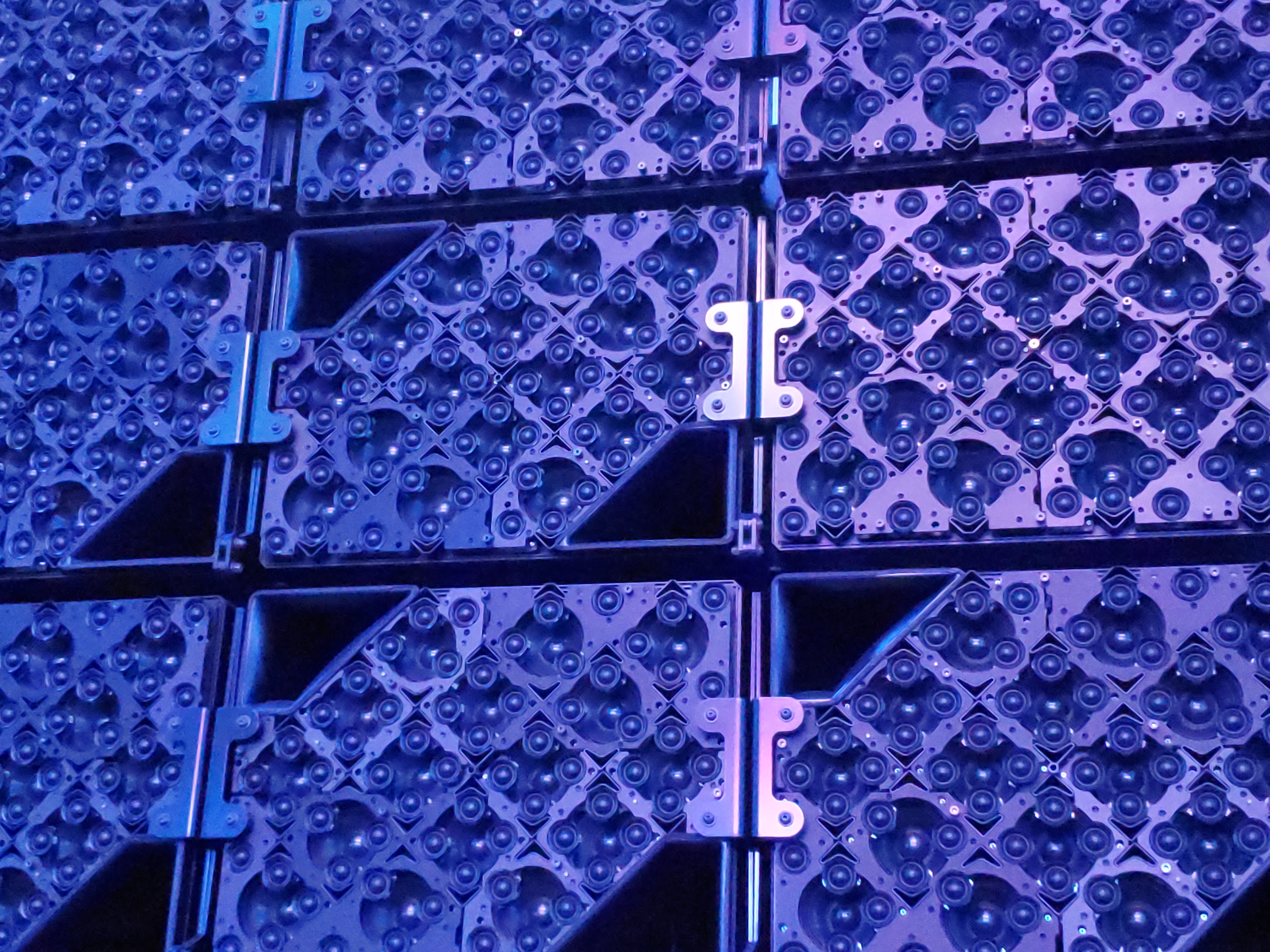
The Holoplot X1 Matrix Array loudspeakers used at Sphere

Sphere's sound system, dubbed "Sphere Immersive Sound", features spatial audio capabilities, and is based on Holoplot's X1 Matrix Array of speakers. The system comprises 1,586 permanently installed speakers and 300 mobile modules, with 99 percent of it hidden behind the LED screen. Using beamforming, the Holoplot X1 speakers can digitally aim sound at specific spots in the audience and deliver a consistent volume to every seat in the venue, even over long distances. The Holoplot X1 arrays can also use wave field synthesis to create a virtual point of origin for sound waves and place them in precise spatial locations, regardless of the actual speaker positioning. Software algorithms compensate for any transmission loss caused by the obstruction from the LED screen.

Each X1 array consists of an MD96 speaker and an MD80-S speaker, which are equipped with 96 and 80 drivers, respectively. Through a matrix of drivers within each speaker module and a matrix of modules per array, Holoplot's system offers more control over the dispersion of sound in horizontal and vertical directions. The location in Sphere where a traditional theatre proscenium would be built features the world's largest loudspeaker array, comprising 464 Holoplot X1 speakers (272 MD96 modules and 192 MD80-S modules) organized into 14 clusters and arranged in a semi-arch about 25–30 feet (7.6–9.1 m) above the stage. In total, the sound system comprises 167,000 speaker drivers, amplifiers, and processing channels, and it weighs 395,120 pounds (179,220 kg).

For sound mixing, engineer Joe O'Herlihy utilised two DiGiCo Quantum SD7 digital mixing consoles with redundant engines; he mixed on one console and maintained a mirrored backup to which he could automatically failover. Each console was capable of 128 input channels, and of the 48 aux-sends available for each channel, O'Herlihy used 32 of them for the Holoplot speaker arrays. He decided to focus the sound image of the band's performances towards the proscenium. By routing separate audio of each band member to the corresponding speaker cluster above their location on stage, he achieved what he called "pictorial audio—where you see the musician, you hear the musician". The immersive speaker clusters, located midway up the auditorium, were used by O'Herlihy for keyboards, backing vocals, guitar treatments, and string or choral arrangements, and he occasionally panned them from side to side to add what he called "shimmer" to the band's sound. O'Herlihy erred on the side of exhibiting restraint in his mix, as panning too far to the sides could have introduced time alignment issues. For certain songs, he made creative mix choices; during the guitar solo of "The Fly", as the visuals directed the audience's attention to the ceiling, he refocused the mix of the guitar to that area.

The band members wore in-ear monitors by Shure with an Axient wireless system. Sound was mixed for their monitors on three DiGiCo consoles: one for Bono, one for the Edge, and one for Clayton and van den Berg. Each console for monitor mixing was also paired with a mirror one for redundancy. Underneath the stage, the crew isolated the Edge's Marshall and Vox AC30 guitar amplifiers and Clayton's bass amplifiers by Ampeg, Matchless, and Fender. Contrasting with his past equipment setups, the Edge added digital amplifier emulation pedals by Universal Audio to his guitar rig and alternated between using them and his amplifiers to achieve specific guitar sounds. Lillywhite said the Edge's guitar initially sounded harsh, necessitating adjustments to be made.

=== Stage with LED floor ===
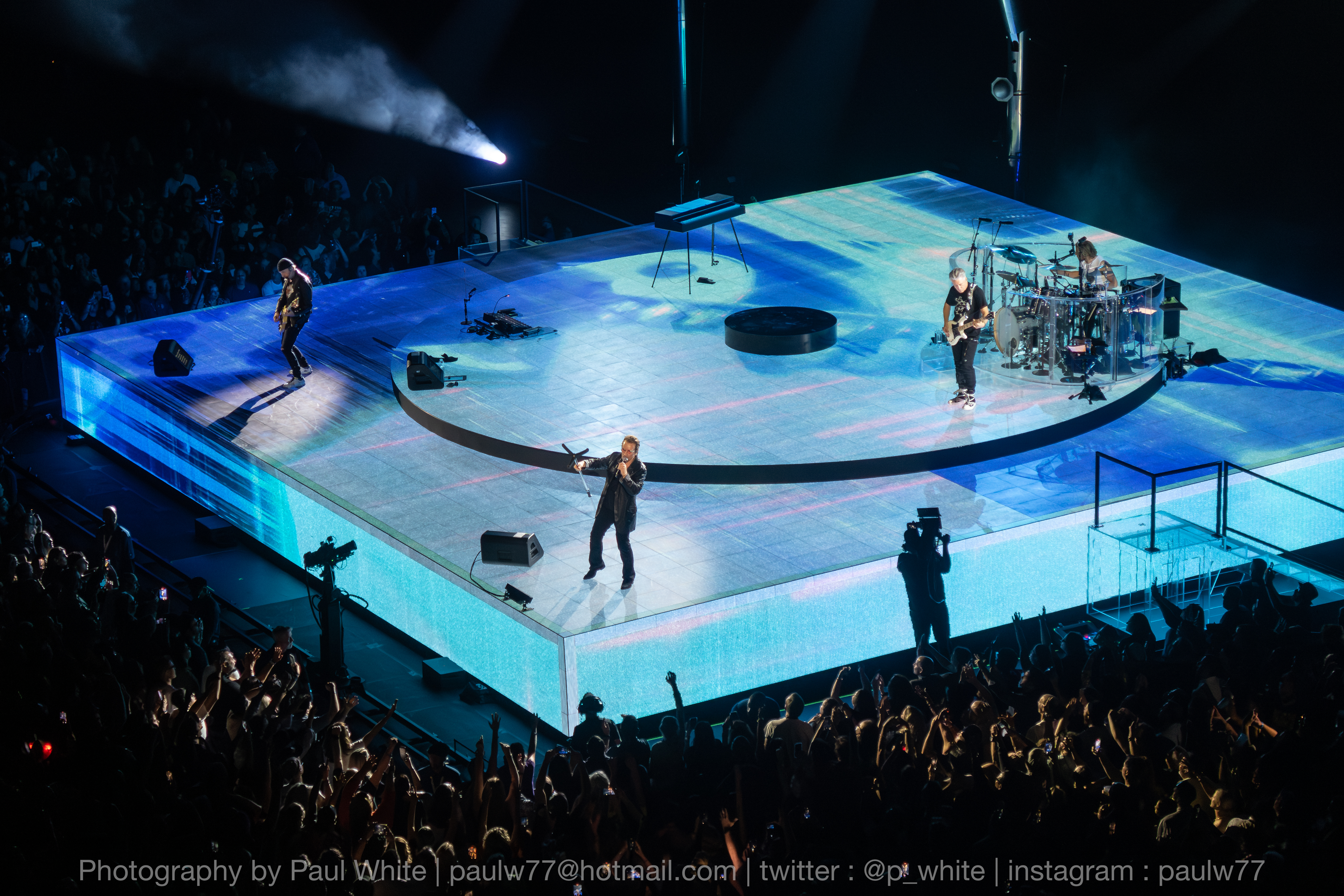
The stage was shaped like a record player and featured LED panels on the surface.

The stage for the residency was shaped like a record player, borrowing its design from the art piece "Turntable", a functional record player designed by Brian Eno. The stage was designed by Ric Lipson of Stufish and was built by Tait, with additional scenic elements provided by the firms SRS Fabrication and Electric Sky and a central turntable built by All Access Staging and Productions. Williams said the idea to replicate the design of "Turntable" began as a joke until the creative team "quickly realised it would be brilliant". The square stage measured 46 feet (14 m) wide and featured a raised circular platter in the center with a 30-foot (9.1 m) diameter. The stage was 6 feet (1.8 m) high in the front and had a two-degree rake to rise to 7.5 feet (2.3 m) in the back. Lipson called it U2's most intimate stage in decades and said that it was deliberately designed without any catwalks so the band members would be limited in how far they could move away from the main performance area. Describing the placement of a minimalist stage within the high amphitheatre layout of Sphere, Lipson said: "It feels like you're in a stadium but with the scale of a club."

The surface of the stage was covered with several models of LED video tiles provided by Fuse: 812 YesTech MG7S floor panels and 56 YesTech MG7S custom circular panels with a 3.9-millimetre (0.15 in) pixel pitch, 2 YesTech MG7S corner panels, 168 YesTech MG11 panels, 42 ROE Vanish V8T panels measuring 1 by 1 metre (3 ft 3 in × 3 ft 3 in), and 63 DesignLED custom flexible tiles measuring 400 by 225 millimetres (15.7 in × 8.9 in). The ROE Vanish panels were chosen for the edges of the stage due to their acoustic transparency, allowing sound from speakers placed underneath the stage to reach the general admission audience. Using the LED tiles, the stage could be lit by an ever-changing cycle of generative "colourscapes" using the algorithm from Eno's "Turntable". At the request of Williams, Eno added a few rules to his algorithm to limit the intensity and duration of certain colours such as green that were considered problematic for lighting older performers. Along the front and sides of the stage, robotic cameras filmed the shows; the camera system used seven Sony Venice 2 units, two Marshall CV380s, two Panasonic UE-100s, and one Panasonic UE-150 PTZ.

=== Lighting system ===
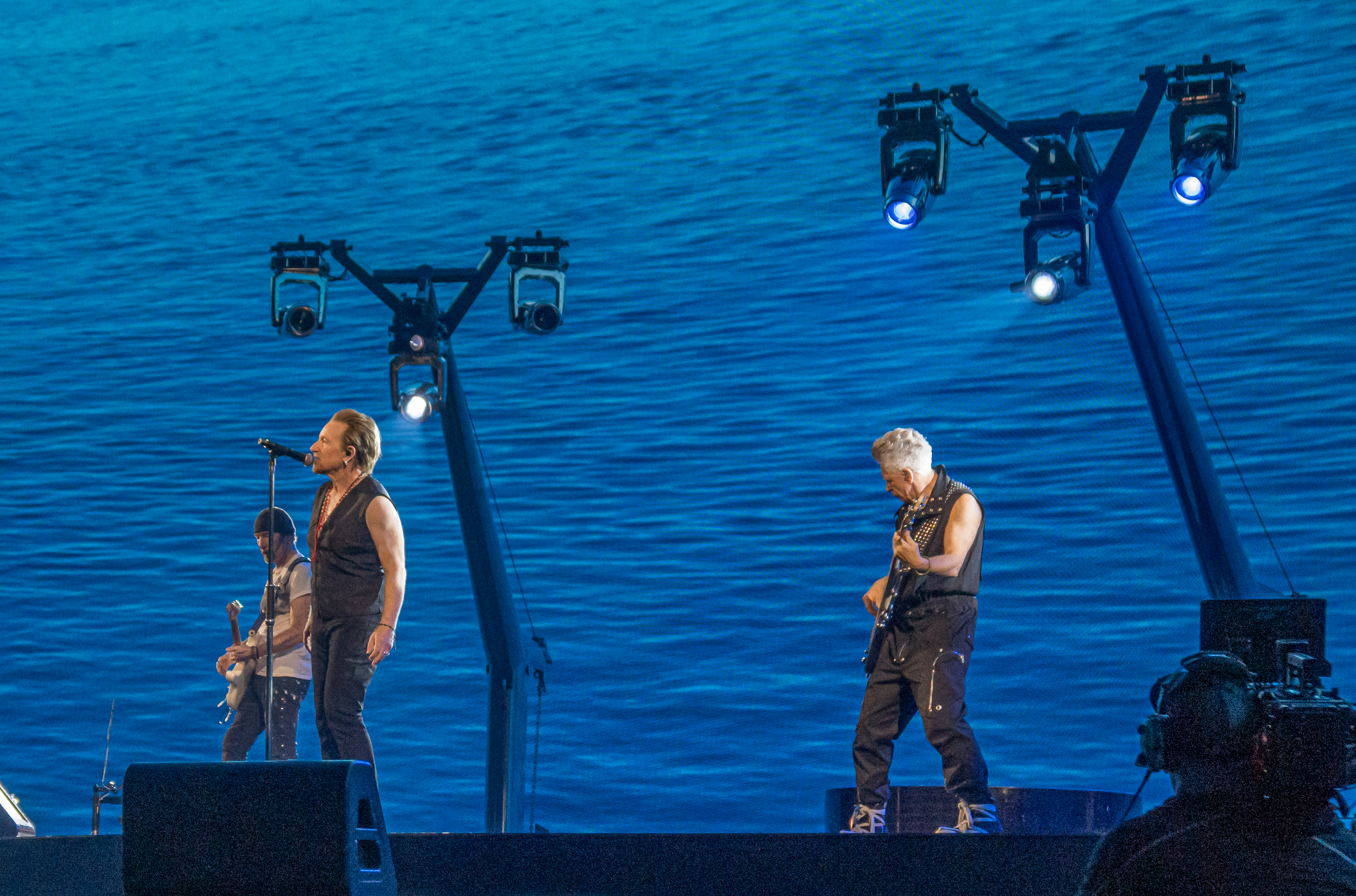
The lighting system used four articulating "lampposts" behind the stage.

Sphere has approximately 150 in-house light fixtures, positioned mostly along the balcony rails and behind the LED screen; the lights behind the screen were used for only two or three cues during U2's shows. A custom lighting system was designed by the band's team to supplement the house system. Four articulating lighting "lampposts" built by Y-Lines were positioned behind the stage, each equipped with two Robe Forte profile lights and a Robe Forte FS followspot. The lampposts stood 32 feet (9.8 m) tall, and via controls from the lighting console, they could articulate from a vertical position to a 95-degree angle. This allowed them to be lowered for cleaner sightlines of the LED screen at certain parts in the show. Williams said that the lampposts' chrome finish also helped them "disappear into the video picture". Additional Robe Forte fixtures were used as key lights along the balcony rails, with a Follow-Me 3D Six tracking system; in total, 24 Robe Forte and 24 Robe Forte FS fixtures were used.

Scattered along the floor were 15 TMB Solaris Quasar 15K Strobe lights, which Murphy liked for the appearance of their filaments cooling down after flashing. For effects lighting, 119 GLP JDC1 strobes and 25 Wildfire VioStorm VS-120 UV lights were placed on the venue's house lighting rails behind the audience. Behind the video screen were 30 GLP XDC1 strobes and 60 Chauvet Strike 1 blinder lights. Six Astera AX2 PixelBar (50 cm) units were placed in a Trabant automobile that moved through the general admission area before concerts. Other equipment that was used included 36 Astera Hydra Panel units with wireless controllers and eight MDG the One haze machines. From several different positions within the venue, the crew operated lighting consoles that included three grandMA2 Full-Size units, two grandMA2 Light units, and six MA NPUs by MA Lighting, across a network system by Luminex; the crew also "jump[ed] in and out of the house system".

=== Video playback and infrastructure ===
The video playback and rendering system used 23 Disguise GX3 media servers. They featured the company's new IP video format conversion (IPVFC) cards, which could output resolutions three times higher than DCI 4K over serial digital interfaces (SDI). Each server was equipped with 30 terabytes of storage—giving the playback system 690 terabytes total—and they were capable of 100 Gigabit Ethernet networking with the production system for media management. The system could play pre-rendered content encoded with the NotchLC codec at 60 frames per second, and it was able to apply real-time effects using the Notch rendering software. Disguise's system utilised the "single large canvas" technology that it introduced in 2022, whereby different sections of Sphere's LED display were dedicated to their own media servers for rendering and the servers were synchronised with each other for simultaneous playback. Rather than the video playback running on timecode or being linked to the lighting system, content was cued manually and triggered over MIDI.

Video data was transferred over IP on a backbone network supporting the SMPTE ST 2110 standard, facilitated by several products by Matrox. The company's ConvertIP DSS boxes received SFP SDI signals carrying DCI 4K resolution video from 26 primary sources and 26 secondary sources (such as the media servers) and converted them into ST 2110-compatible IP signals. Matrox's ConductIP product was then used to route and orchestrate data sources on Sphere's network. The production system used 30 computers that were operated by one programmer and two technicians; to allow the machines to be monitored and controlled from a single workstation with one keyboard, mouse, and monitor setup, Matrox's line of Extio 3 products were used for KVM switching.

During each concert, 200–300 gigabytes of video data were processed every minute, while an average of 402 gigabytes of audio and video data were transferred every second. To help process the large amount of data, U2's team employed the company WEKA for storage server solutions. Its Data Platform was used to migrate 500 terabytes of archival video footage via cloud servers, from the United Kingdom where it had been rendered to a local cluster of WEKA servers at Sphere.

=== 4D effects ===
Sphere contains multi-sensory 4D features such as scent and wind, along with haptic technology in 10,000 seats. When U2:UV Achtung Baby Live began, the show was not utilising them. Williams believed that not enough fans would be sitting in their seats to make the effort required to integrate haptic cues worthwhile. He said that the creative team "ran out of time and energy so [they] picked [their] battles" when deciding which features to use. Haptics were incorporated into the show later in the residency; one such example was during the song "Until the End of the World", which featured haptic cues developed by Jacknife Lee. Scents were unused because Williams was unsure how audiences would react to them and he thought the creative team would have ended up going down "blind alleys" pursuing them. He joked about the aromatic capabilities: "I wouldn't give that idea to a bunch of Irish guys".

== Show overview ==
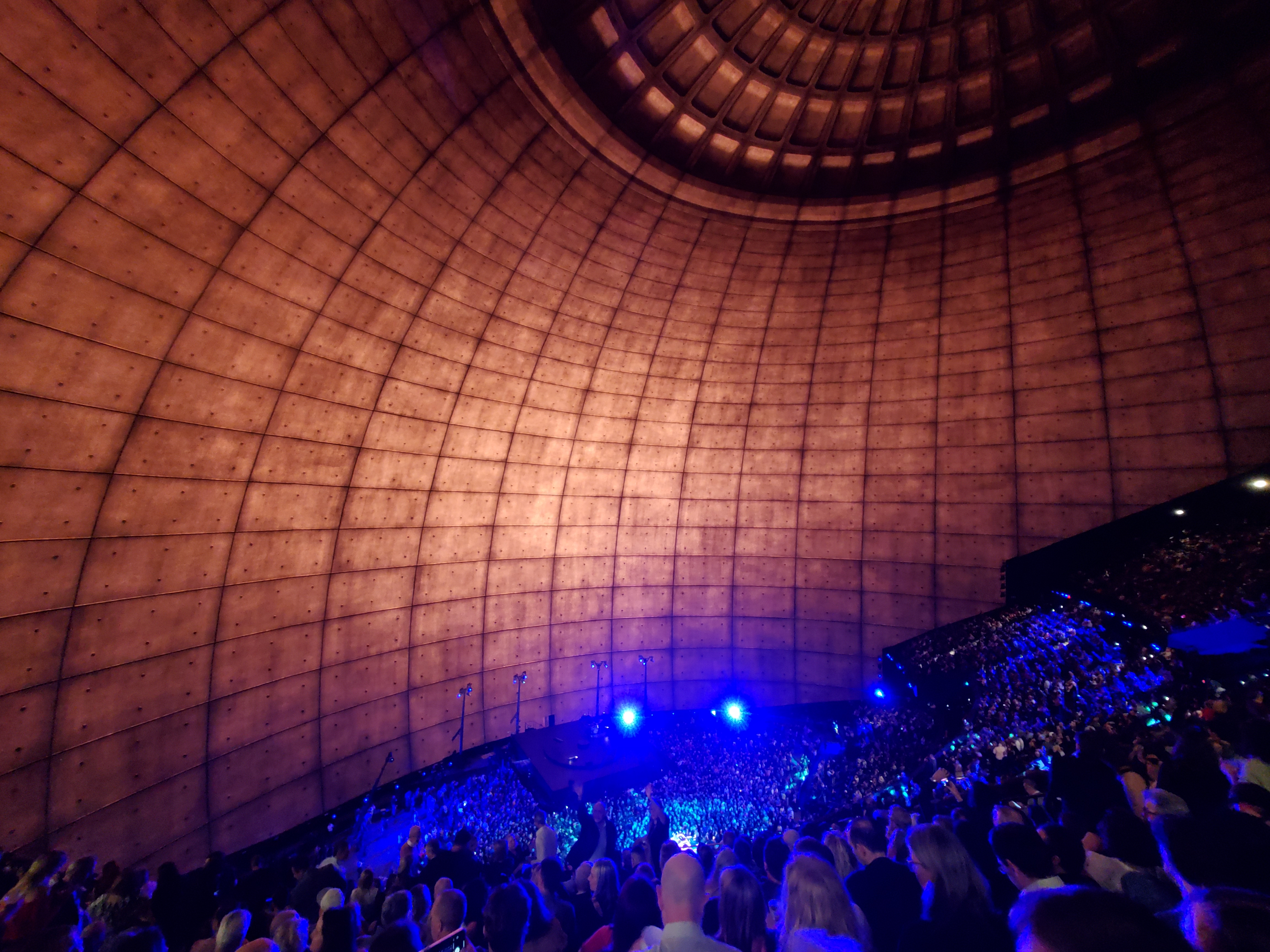
During the pre-show, the interior of Sphere resembled a concrete dome.

The opening act for the concerts was UK-based drummer and multi-instrumentalist Pauli "the PSM" Lovejoy, who deejayed music from inside a neon Trabant that moved around the general admission area. During the entire pre-show, the LED screen displayed what appeared to be the interior of a concrete dome, with an oculus at the top "revealing" the night sky. J. R. Lind of Pollstar described it as "a Brutalist reimagining of the interior of Rome's Pantheon". Lipson said it was inspired by caves being some of the first settings in which humans created light and performances, and he liked the idea of audiences arriving at Sphere feeling like they were in a modern cave. Bono described the opening as being set in Plato's cave. Several visual Easter eggs were included near the top of the dome, such as a bird flying from coffer to coffer, a helium balloon floating through the oculus, a flickering work light, and a helicopter in the night sky.

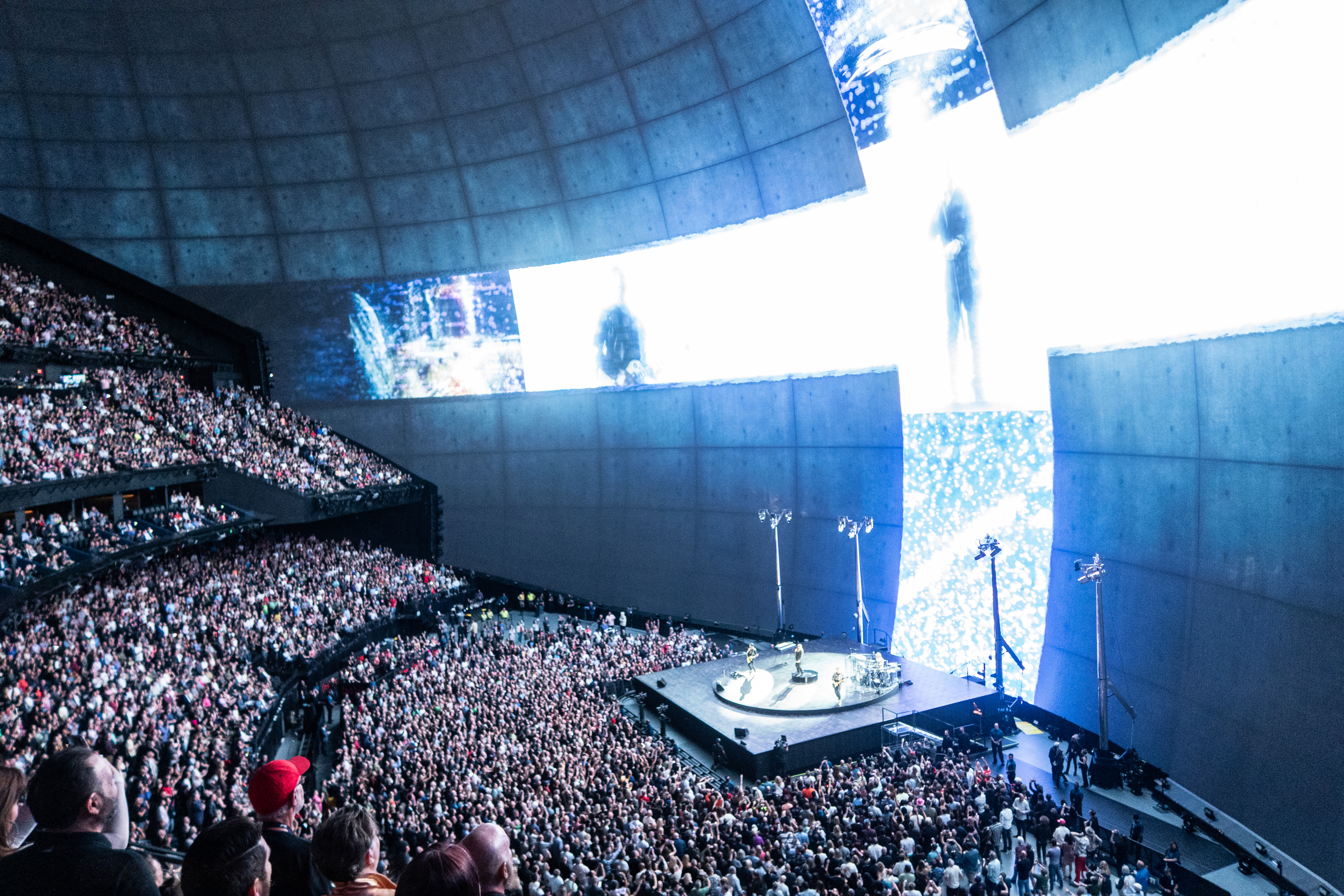
"Zoo Station" began concerts with the concrete dome from the pre-show splitting apart to reveal video imagery in the cross-shaped opening.

After Lovejoy completed their DJ set, a new remix of U2's 1993 song "Lemon" and a "Choral Intro" by Brian Eno were played over the sound system. As the band arrived on stage, Bono briefly sang a sean-nós melody. They began the concerts with eight consecutive songs from Achtung Baby, performed in the same order as they had been on the Zoo TV Tour. As the introduction to "Zoo Station" was played, the concrete visuals on screen appeared to crack open, splitting into four quadrants; this allowed in light in the shape of a cross, which was inspired by the architecture of the Church of the Light. The opening revealed flickering video screens that displayed closeups of the four band members as well as some of Mark Pellington's original footage from the Zoo TV Tour. Standing on a small platform that slowly spun in the centre of the stage, Bono began the concerts wearing the wraparound sunglasses that were characteristic of his Fly stage persona from the Zoo TV Tour.

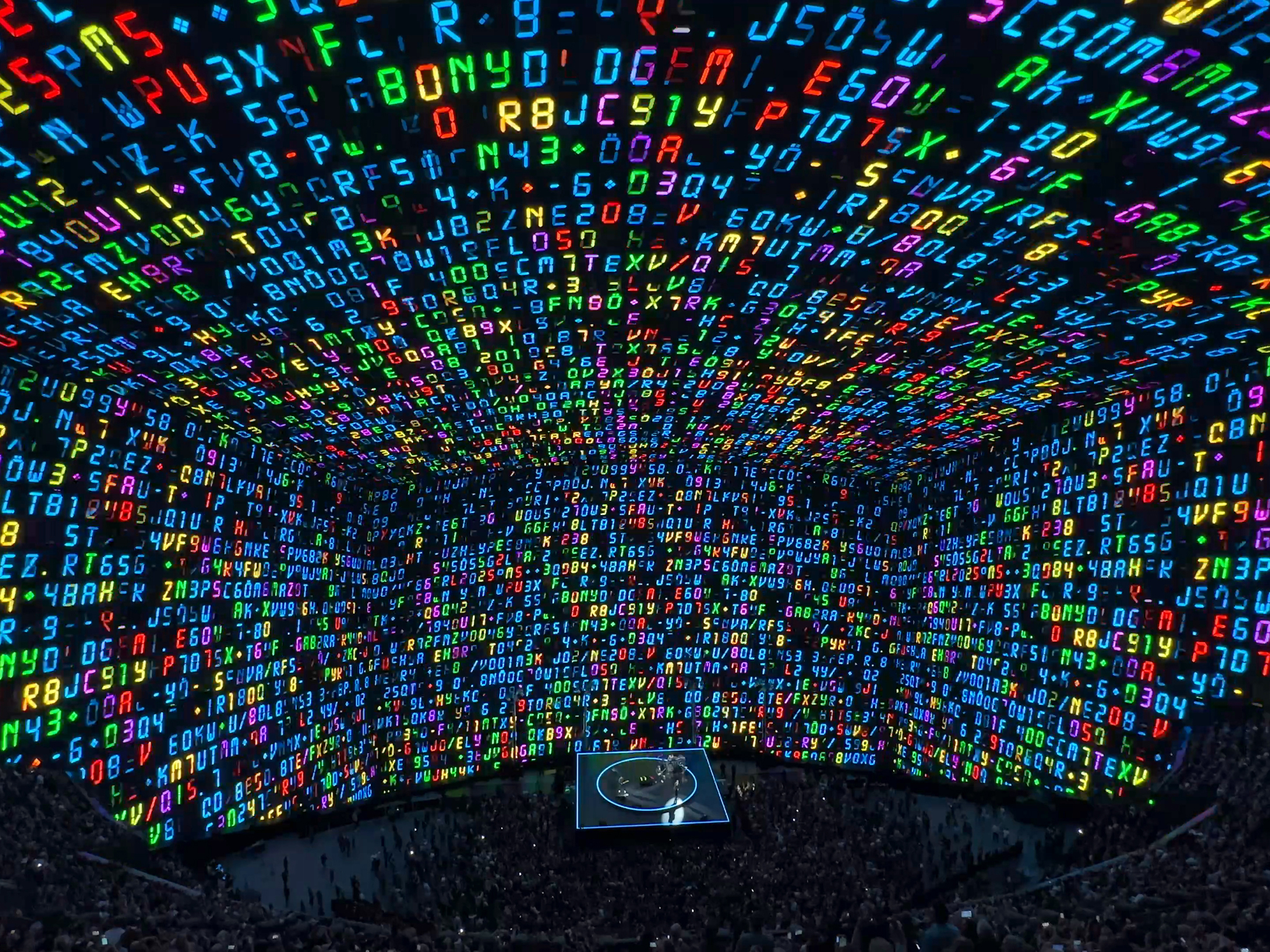
During "The Fly", a barrage of multi-coloured characters flashed on screen and created the illusion of a cube-shaped space.

The second song, "The Fly", utilised a presentation similar to the one from the Zoo TV Tour, with a barrage of rapidly flashing words and aphorisms displaying on screen that recalled the work of Jenny Holzer. The imagery underwent a perspective shift, causing the optical illusion that the venue was cube-shaped rather than spherical. At the song's midpoint, seven-segment digital letters and numbers in a variety of colors slowly filled up the entire screen from bottom to top, followed by the ceiling appearing to fall towards the audience. For "Even Better Than the Real Thing", Brambilla's kaleidoscopic video piece "King Size", comprising imagery of Elvis Presley and various Las Vegas iconography, played on the screen, scrolling from ceiling to floor to make the audience feel the false sensation that the stage was rising. "Mysterious Ways" was performed next, with the screen displaying moving bars of light that David Barbour of Lighting & Sound International said "creat[ed] a kind of Zoetrope effect".

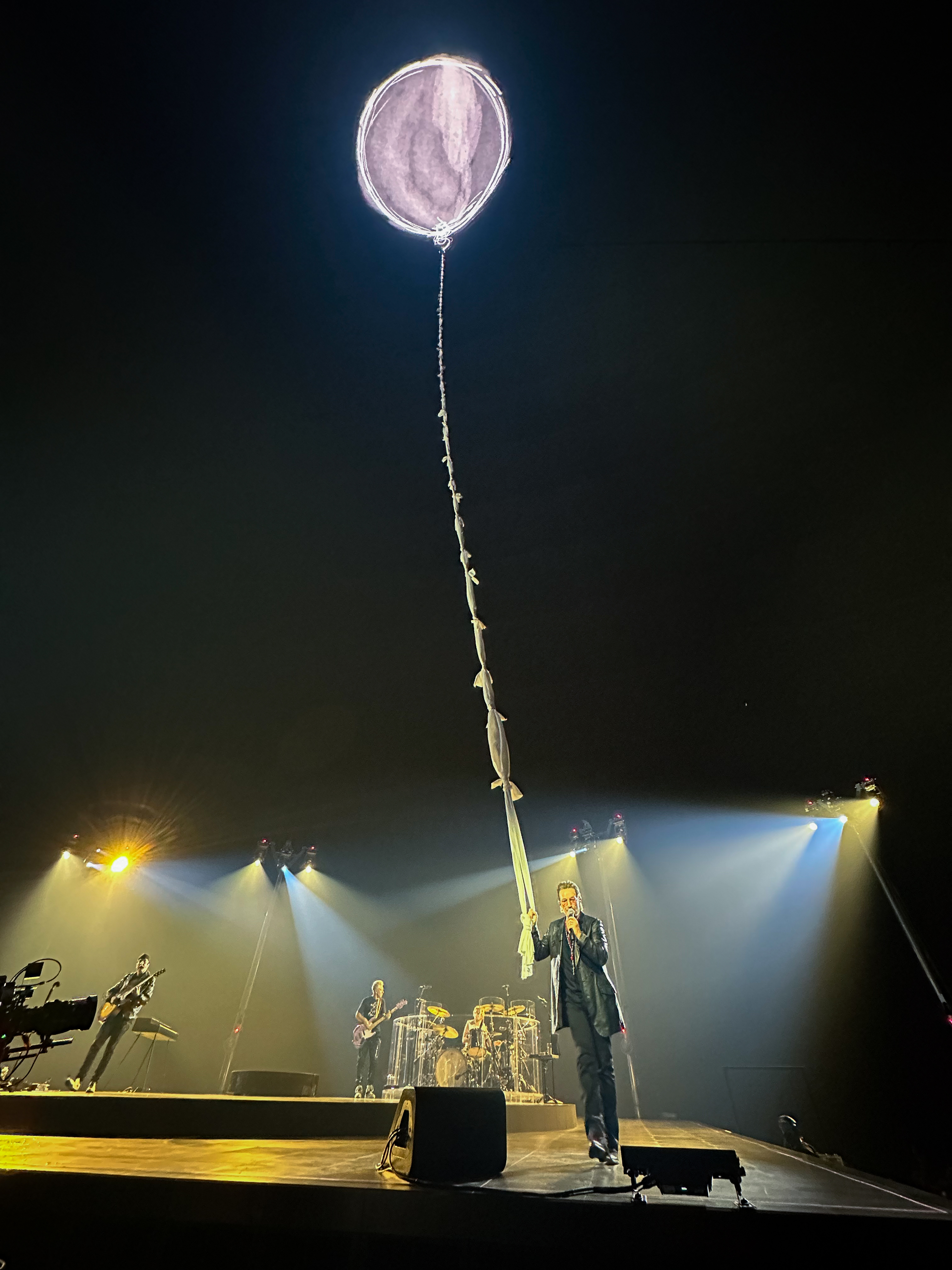
For "Tryin' to Throw Your Arms Around the World", Bono held a tether connected to an on-screen balloon.

For "One", the video screen displayed a starfield, along with closeups of the band members on digital billboards. The layout of the billboards replicated that of the video screens used on the Zoo TV Tour's "Outside Broadcast" and "Zooropa" legs. An interlude followed during which the group performed a stripped-down cover of Presley's song "Love Me Tender", accompanied by clips of Elvis's wedding to Priscilla Presley, John F. Kennedy's "We choose to go to the Moon" speech, and an Apollo rocket launch. "Until the End of the World" was performed next, during which footage of storm clouds, lightning, and rising water were shown on screen. The song culminated with Gerrard's video art piece "Flare", with showed a gas flare burning in the shape of a flag; set in the open ocean, it was meant "to illustrate warming seas and pollution". Transitioning into the song "Who's Gonna Ride Your Wild Horses", the screen showed flaming embers falling from the ceiling, as closeups of the band members were also shown. For "Tryin' to Throw Your Arms Around the World", a digital chalk drawing of a balloon, designed by the Edge's wife Morleigh Steinberg, was displayed high on screen. It was attached to an actual tether of knotted-up bedsheets that Bono held onto from the stage. Initial performances featured him picking a fan from the crowd to join him on stage to hold the tether and swing in it. For later performances, a prop door was added and visuals of a moving sidewalk were displayed on the stage floor, with the story being that Bono had returned home with the balloon only to realise he was locked out and unable to find his keys as he peered through the peephole; these changes were intended to give Bono's performance a narrative destination.

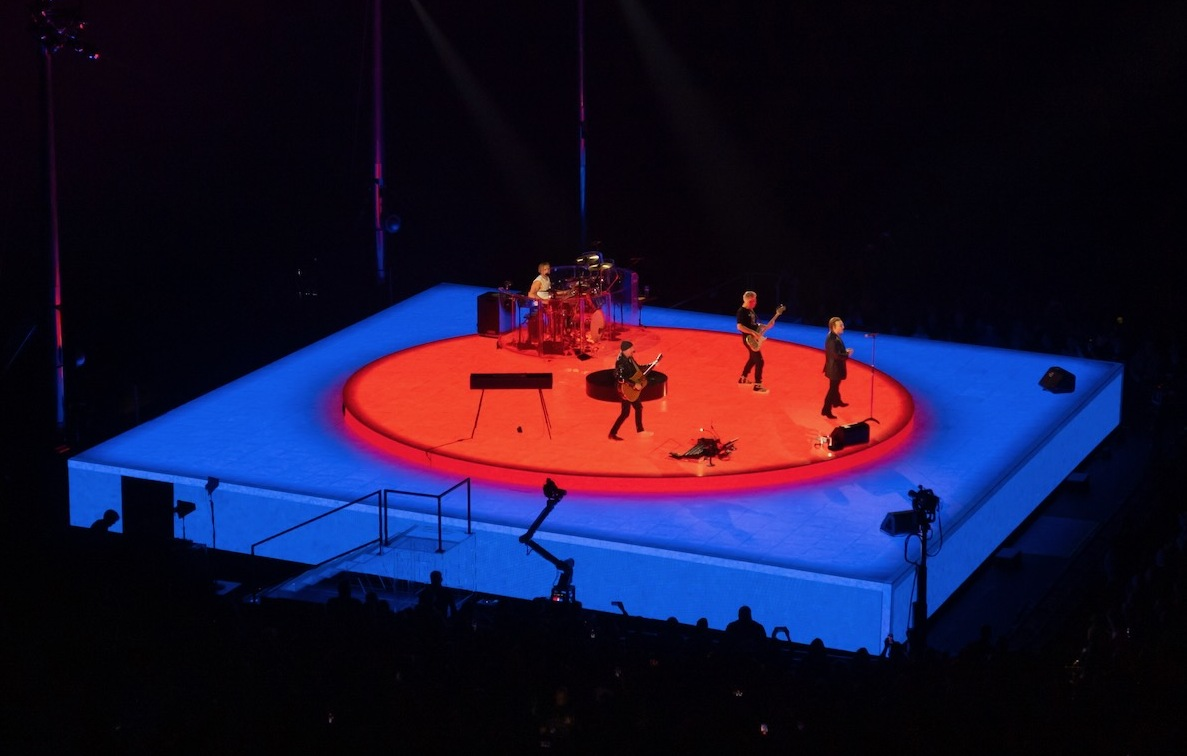
The turntable stage featured algorithmically-generated colourscapes during the semi-acoustic segment of the show.

The show then transitioned to a segment of semi-acoustic performances, during which the turntable stage was the focal point and minimal video imagery was displayed. The stage's LED panels cycled through algorithmically-generated "colourscapes" during this portion of the show. Williams said, "After 40 years of decision-making, I was quite giddy with the thought that we might have 20 minutes during a U2 show where the stage itself was deciding its own colour palette." Many of the song arrangements during this section were taken from the band's 2023 album of re-recordings Songs of Surrender. For the residency's opening weekend, four songs from the group's 1988 album Rattle and Hum were performed during this segment.

For the end of the show's main set, the band returned to Achtung Baby to perform its remaining four songs, beginning with "So Cruel" and "Acrobat". For "Ultraviolet (Light My Way)" (from which the "UV" in the residency name is derived), the visuals changed several times during the residency: at one point, "cascading vaporous rainbows" danced across the screen, according to Pollstar's Andy Gensler. For later performances, the screen displayed visuals of a moving disco ball. Concluding the main set was "Love Is Blindness", during which the screen was mostly a solid blue hue before slowly filling up with the silhouettes of insects until it was nearly blacked out completely. Bono said these visuals were intended to set up Devlin's "Nevada Ark" artwork that would be displayed later in the show.

After a brief break, U2 returned to the stage for an encore of six songs, with Bono wearing a white dinner jacket. The band first performed "Elevation", during which the LED surface of the stage flashed pulsing light-bar patterns. After singing a snippet of Frank Sinatra's signature song "My Way", the band performed the Las Vegas-inspired song "Atomic City", during which the nighttime skyline of the Las Vegas Strip was displayed on screen, giving the impression that the building had disappeared and that the show was outdoors. Progressively, the buildings were deconstructed in a reverse time-lapse, until only the empty desert remained. During the next song "Vertigo", the screens showed helicopters in the nighttime sky aiming spotlights in which the band members were projected.

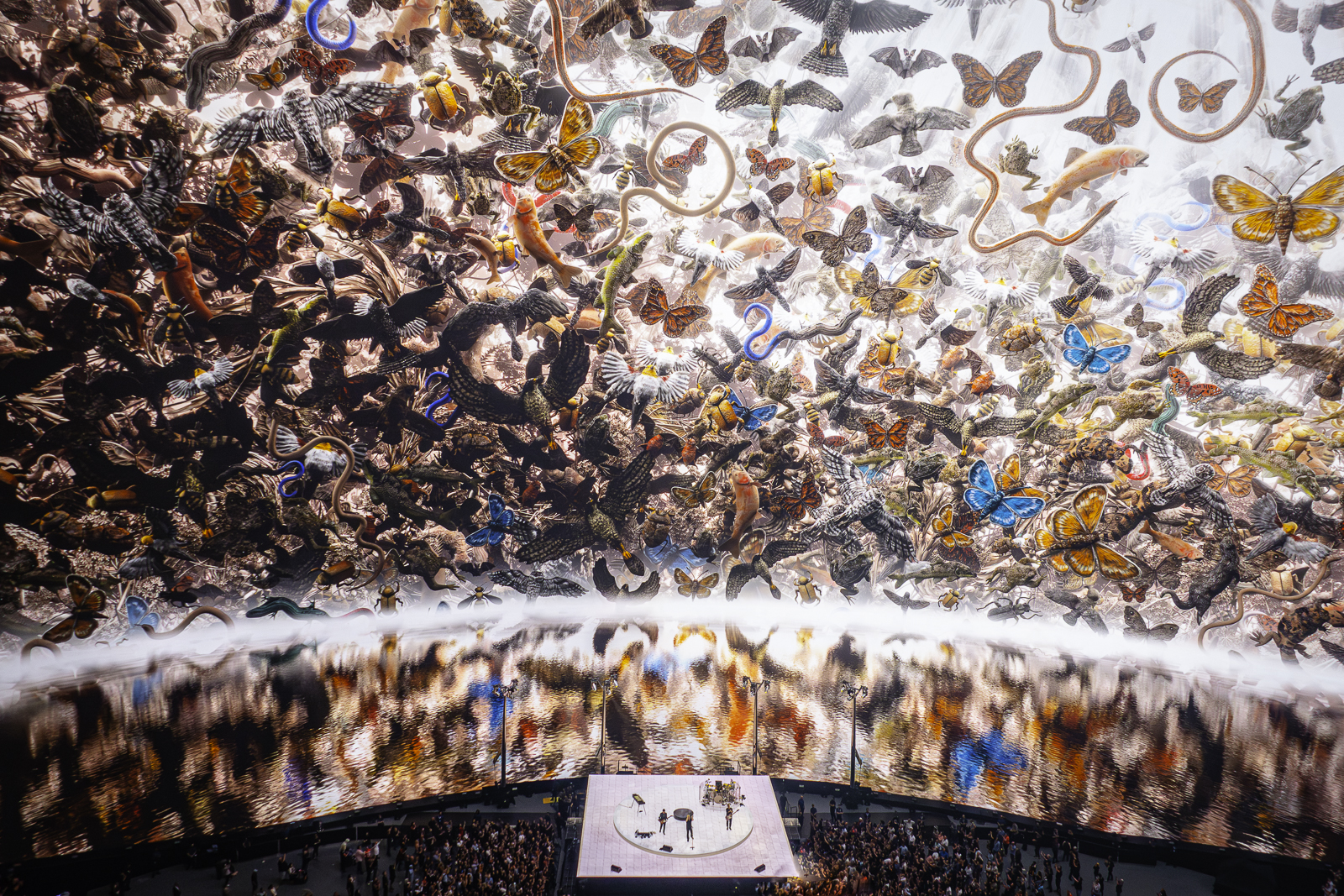
Es Devlin's "Nevada Ark", which was shown during the final two songs

For "Where the Streets Have No Name", another video sequence from Gerrard's "Flag" series titled "Surrender" was displayed. The desert imagery transitioned to sunrise while a plume of water vapour formed a white flag on screen. Danny Eccleston of Mojo said that the visuals harkened back to the band's 1983 War Tour when Bono used a white flag as a stage prop. Gerrard's segment was meant to hint at a world that could be less dependent on fossil fuels. For "With or Without You", the on-screen desert slowly filled up with water until it was completely covered. The view slowly zoomed into an orb floating in the water until it entered an opening, revealing Devlin's "Nevada Ark" artwork inside; across the entire screen, sepia-toned imagery of endangered species from Nevada was displayed. Bob Gendron, writing for the Chicago Tribune, said the artwork was "reminiscent of a fresco ceiling in an old cathedral". During the concluding song "Beautiful Day", the images of the animals progressively transitioned into full colour. The band then left the stage, accompanied by the then-unreleased U2 song "Glorify" featuring Brittany Howard playing over the PA system. As the audience left the venue following the concert, the imagery of the animals from "Nevada Ark" was displayed on the venue's exosphere screen.

=== Guest appearances ===
During the concert on 25 October 2023, pop singer Lady Gaga accompanied the band for a cover version of her 2018 song "Shallow" and the U2 songs "All I Want Is You" and "I Still Haven't Found What I'm Looking For".

Larry Mullen Jr. attended the penultimate show on 1 March 2024 in a luxury suite. Bono paid tribute to his bandmate before the final song, prompting the audience to chant Mullen's name.

On 2 March 2024, the final date of the residency, Achtung Baby co-producer Daniel Lanois joined U2 for a performance of "One". Later during the concert, the band covered the Crowded House song "Don't Dream It's Over", performing a virtual duet with the song's writer Neil Finn using a new recording of the track that he had emailed to U2.

== Promotions, marketing, and branding ==
In the lead-up to the residency, Apple Music posted several promotional videos online of interviews that the music presenter Zane Lowe conducted with Bono and the Edge. On 21 April 2023, a video was released in which the trio toured the unfinished Sphere as well as the Neon Museum during a visit the month prior. On 5 October, another video was released featuring a tour of the completed venue.

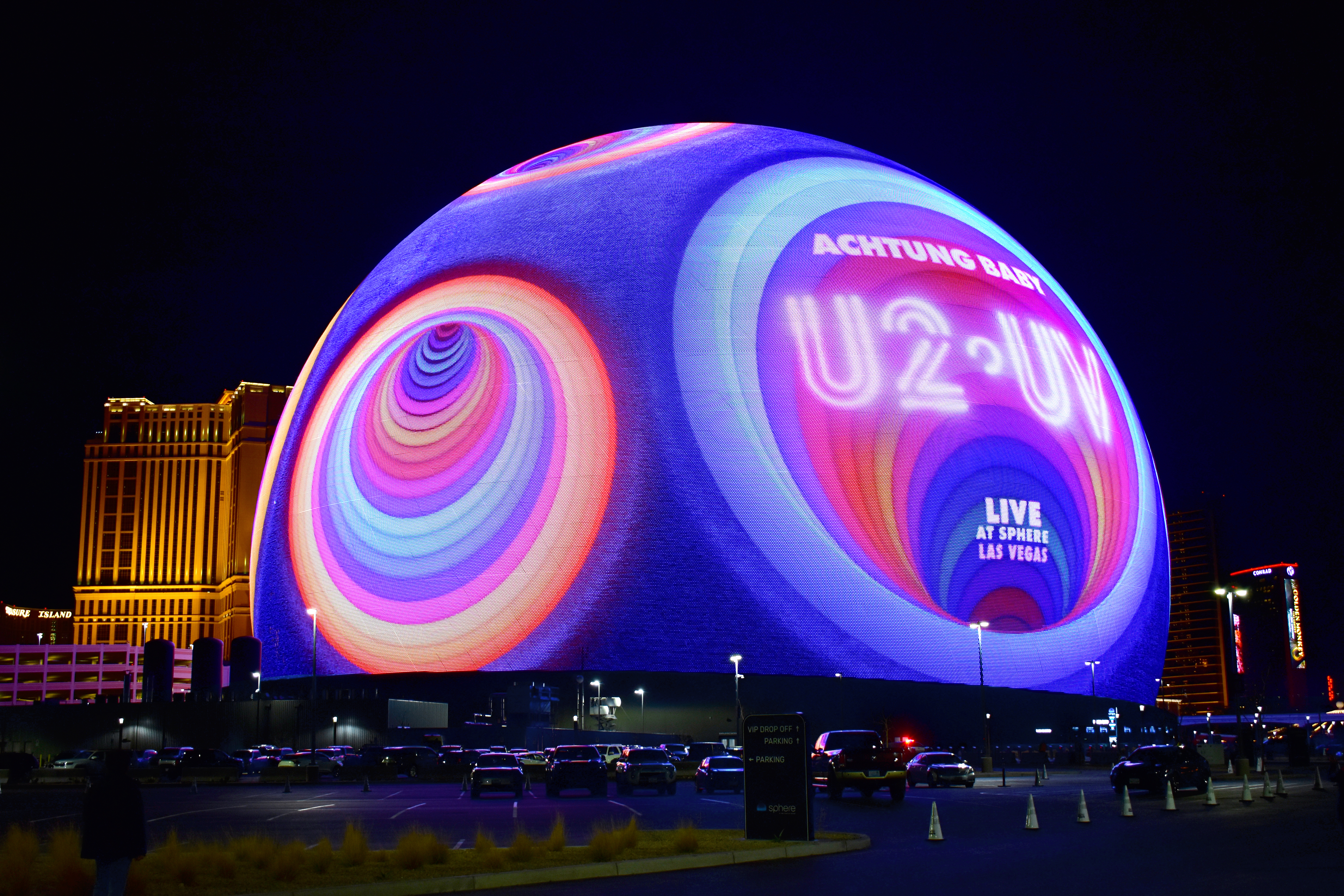
Sphere displaying visuals promoting the residency during U2's 26 January 2024 concert

The logo for U2:UV Achtung Baby Live was designed by Stufish to "encapsulate the spirit of the U2 live experience, the intricate stage design, the vibrant allure of Las Vegas neon lights, and the architecture of the Sphere". It was inspired by the "Turntable" phonograph by Eno that served as the basis for the residency's stage design. Multiple variations of the logo were created in different colours, while an animated version that shifted colours, like Eno's "Turntable", was also created for digital use and for display on Sphere's exosphere LED screen. The branding debuted on the exosphere on 29 August 2023, a month prior to the residency's first concert. The promotional graphics package also included an animated "space baby" that was produced by Moment Factory, Belo FX, Agora Studio, and Mathematic.

As a promotional tie-in to the residency, U2 issued a Las Vegas-themed single called "Atomic City". It was recorded at Sound City Studios in Los Angeles and produced by Jacknife Lee and Steve Lillywhite. U2 began filming a music video for the song in Las Vegas on 16 September 2023. With the band members set up on a moving flatbed truck, the shoot began at the 3rd Street Stage on Fremont Street and culminated at midnight at the Carousel Bar in front of the Plaza Hotel & Casino, where the group were met by a crowd that included 250 extras. In addition to several takes of "Atomic City", U2 performed "I Still Haven't Found What I'm Looking For", whose music video had been filmed on Fremont Street in 1987. Mullen participated in the video shoot, despite being absent from the residency. The single was released digitally on 29 September and later on limited-edition CD and 7-inch vinyl formats.

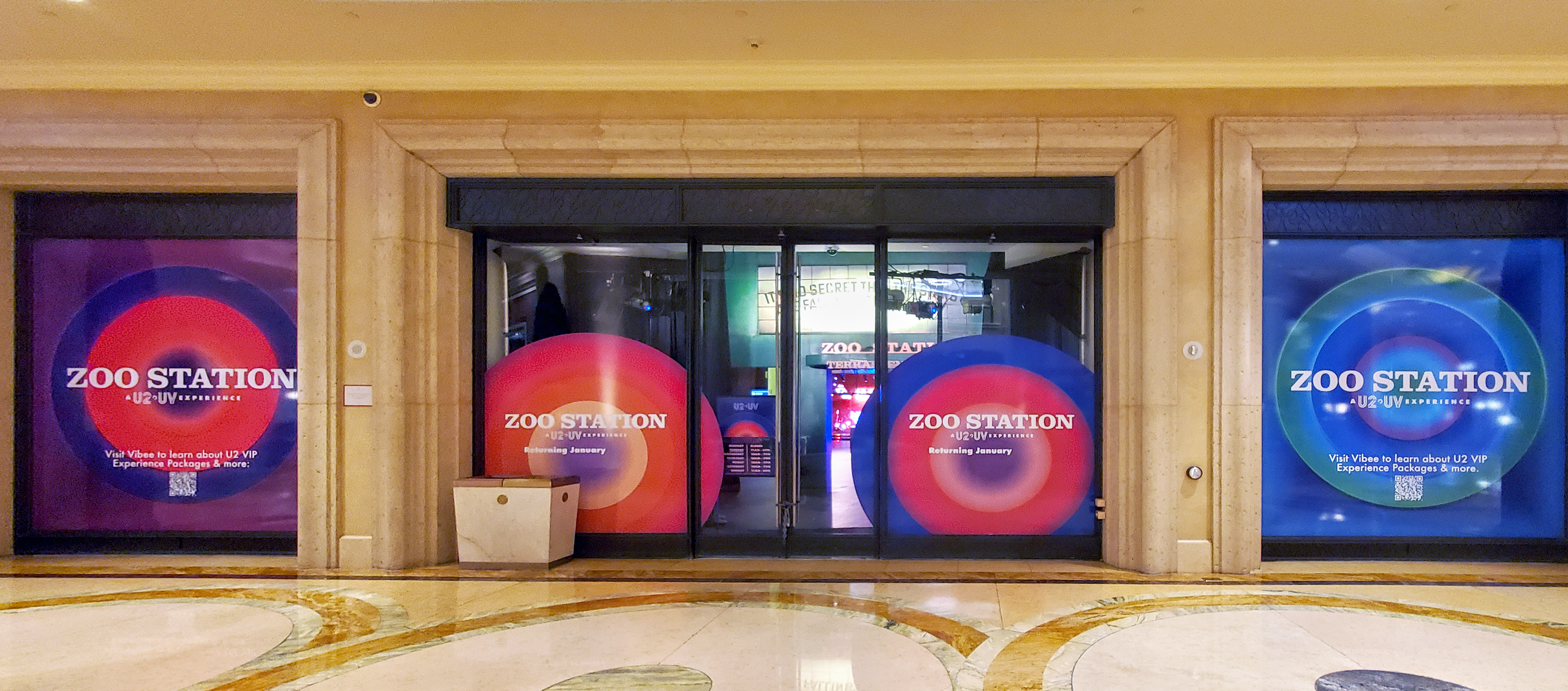
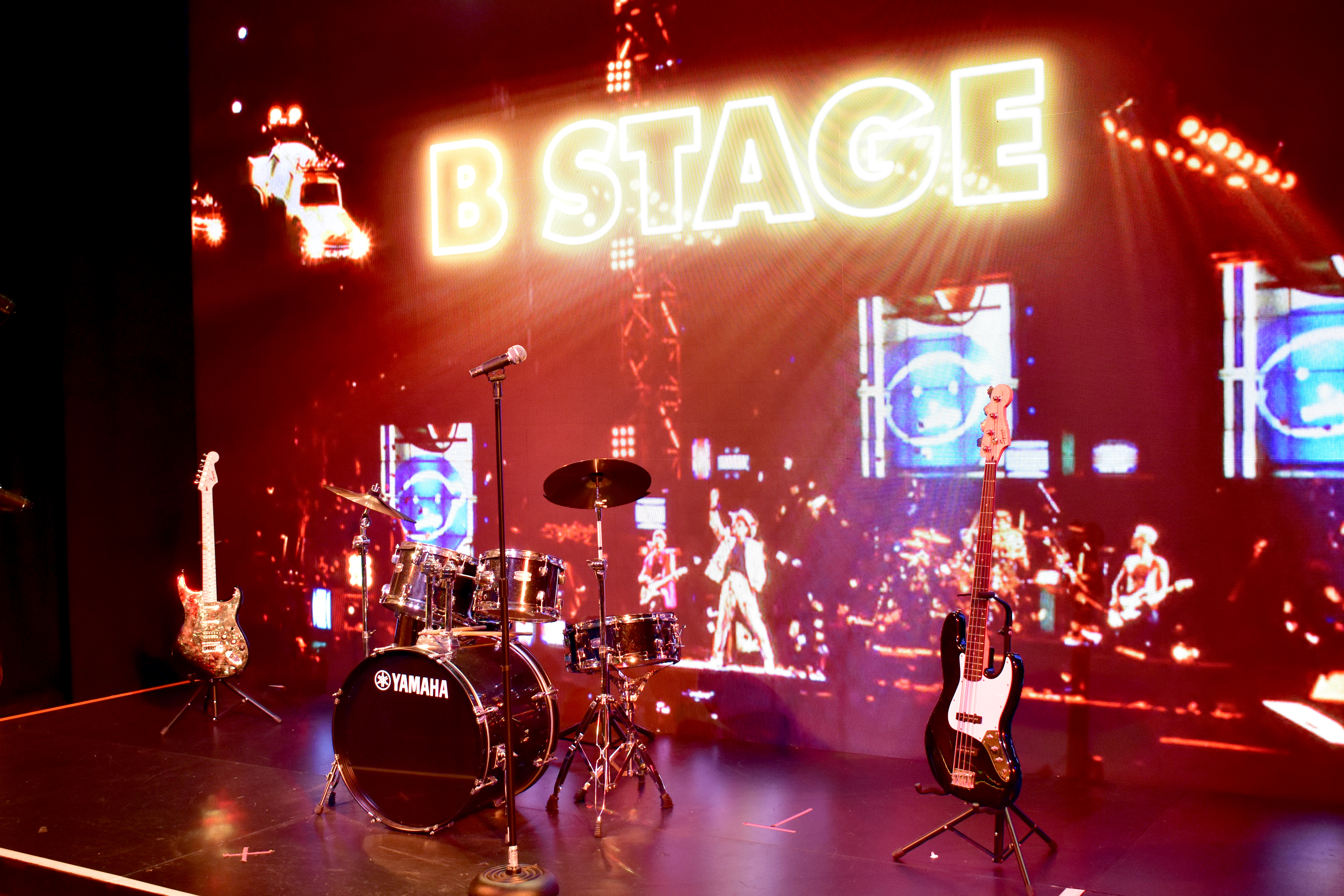
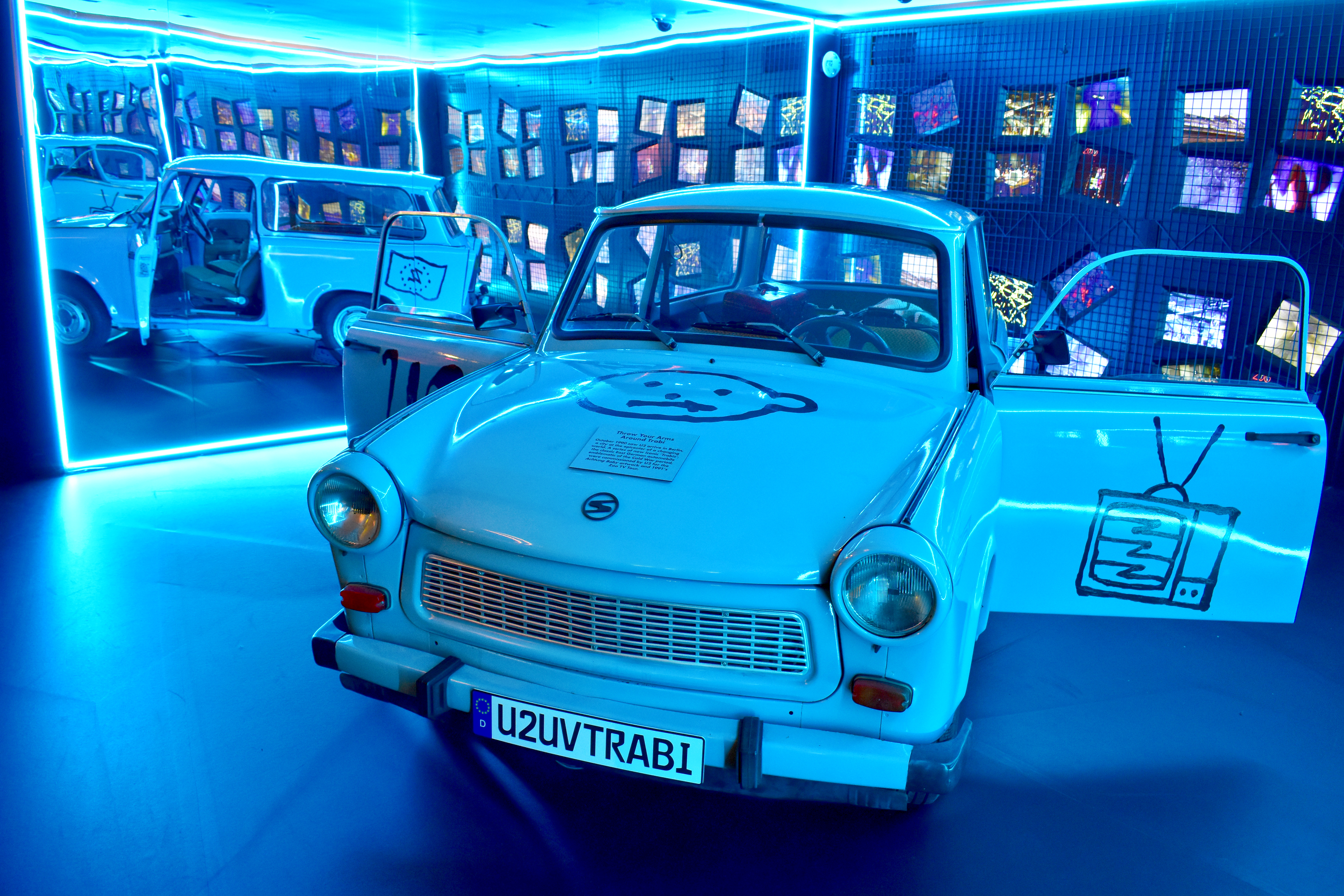
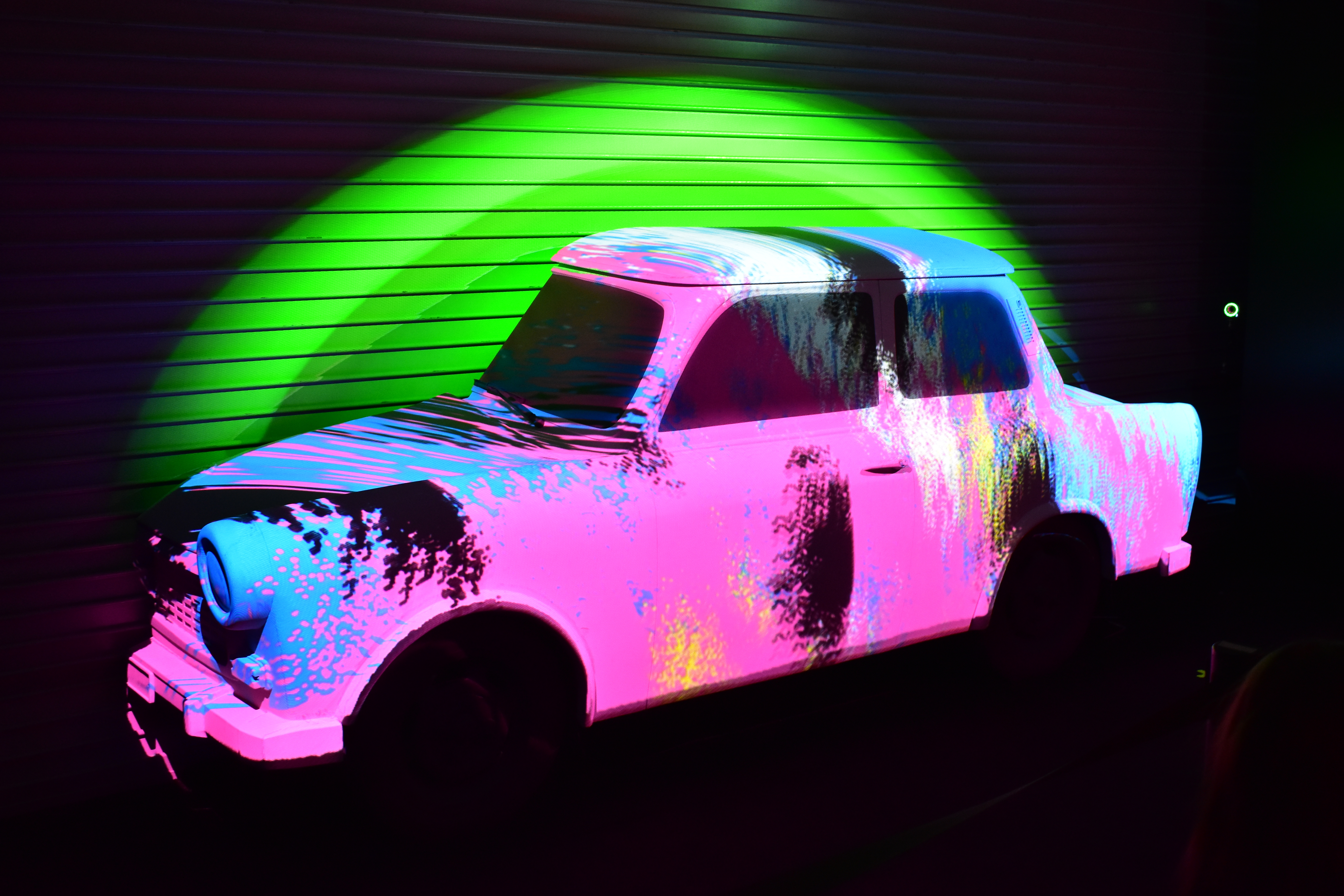
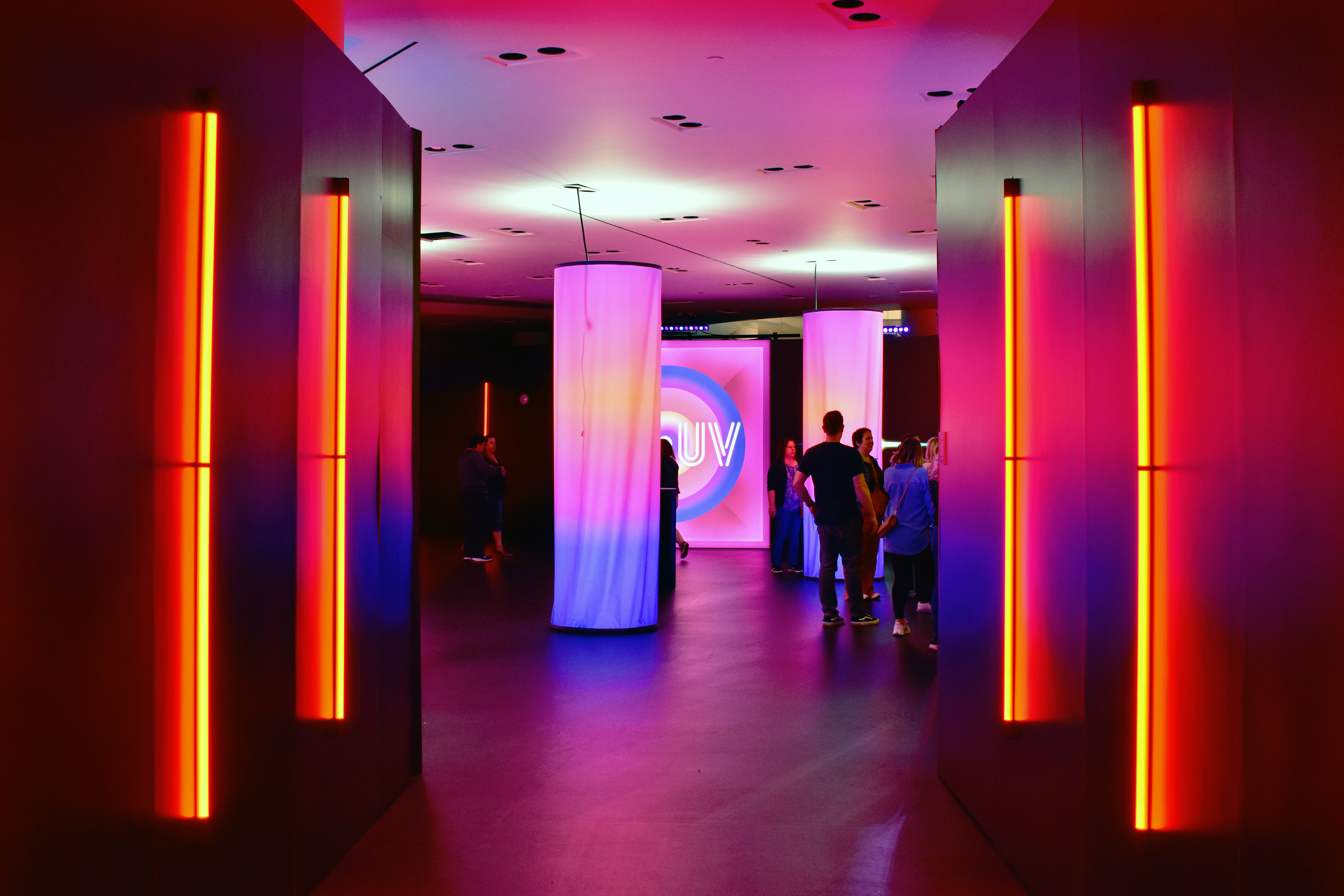
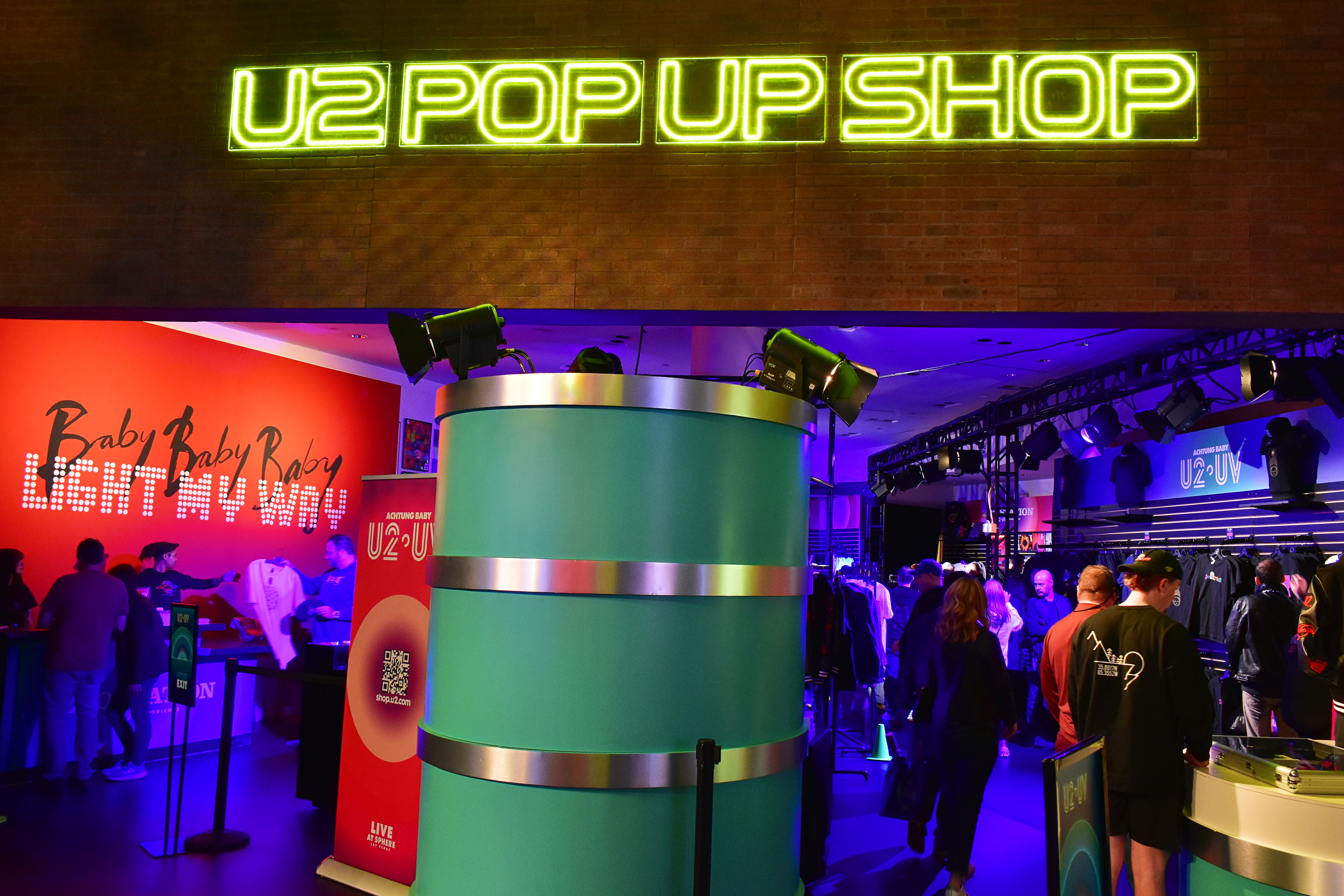
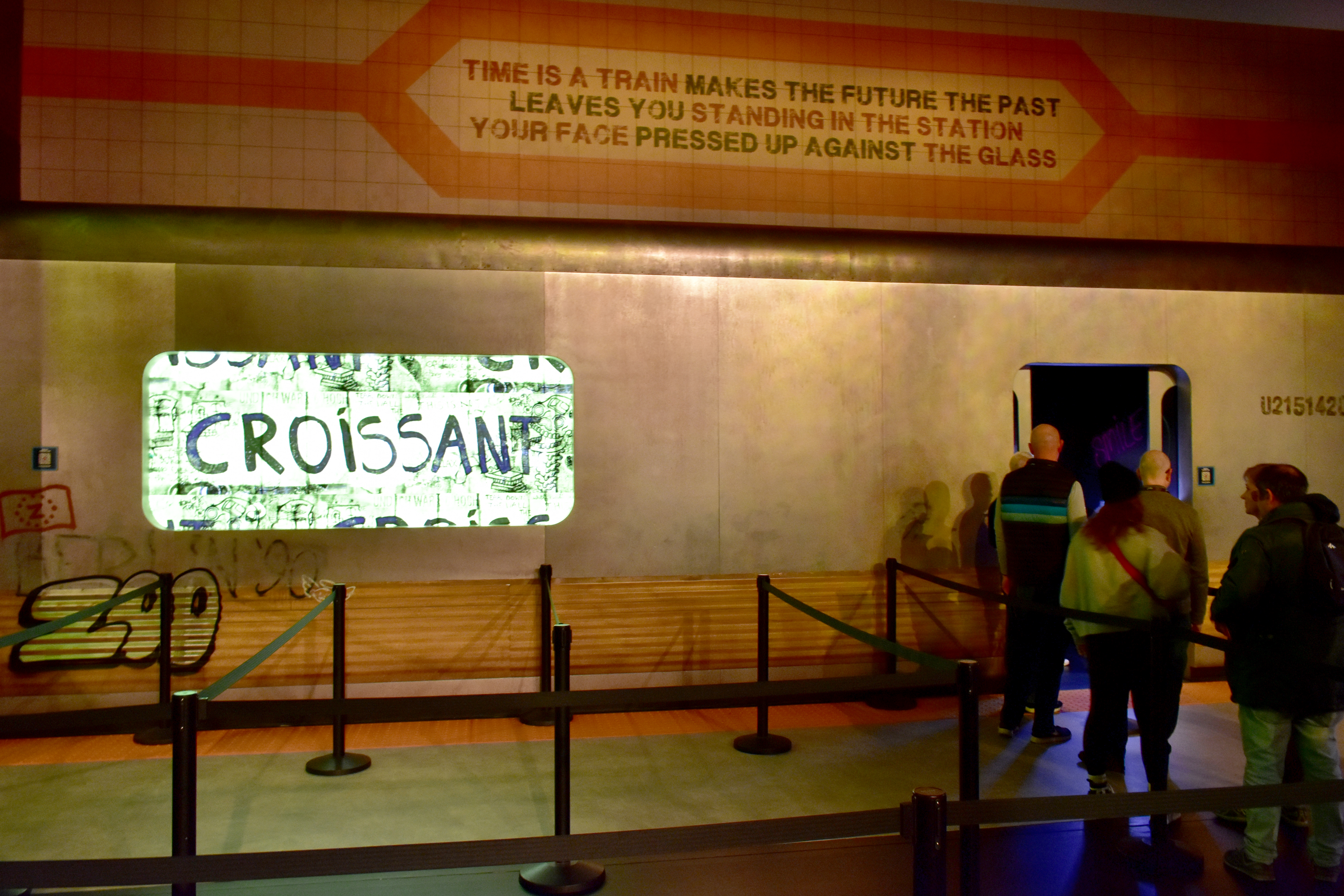
Zoo Station: A U2:UV Experience, a promotional fan exhibit that was temporarily open at the Venetian

On 28 September 2023, a pop-up exhibit called "Zoo Station: A U2:UV Experience" opened in the Venetian resort, comprising 12,000 square feet (1,100 m^{2}) of space across two floors for interactive displays related to U2. Created by Vibee in collaboration with the group's long-time creative director Gavin Friday, the exhibit featured: a gallery of photography and video taken by the band's photographer Anton Corbijn; a pop-up shop of merchandise; the "Zoo TV Cinema", a theatre that screened a daily selection of five films curated by the Edge; a replica of the Zoo TV Tour B-stage on which attendees could record an animated GIF; a life-size German subway train; a vintage Trabant automobile and an interactive "cyber-Trabant" that attendees could graffiti with digital spray paint; a photo booth; and the "Ultra Violet Lounge" and "Fly Bar". In lieu of a traditional museum-like exhibit, the band "wanted to bring to life the themes" from Achtung Baby. According to Vibee vice president Harvey Cohen, more than 15,000 people visited the exhibit on the residency's opening weekend.

Ambient remixes of Achtung Baby's songs were created for the residency for playing in common areas of Sphere on concert days and throughout the Zoo Station exhibit.

U2 partnered with Fandiem to create a sweepstake that offered a U2:UV Achtung Baby Live prize package to fans, with a donation to the Farmlink Project required to enter. The contest prize included backstage passes to a U2 show at Sphere, hotel and travel accommodations, and a meet-and-greet opportunity with the band.

In January 2024, a Dolby Atmos surround sound mix of Achtung Baby was digitally released to streaming platforms. The new mix premiered at the cinema in the Zoo Station exhibit at the Venetian, the same week U2's residency resumed for 2024.

== Critical reception ==
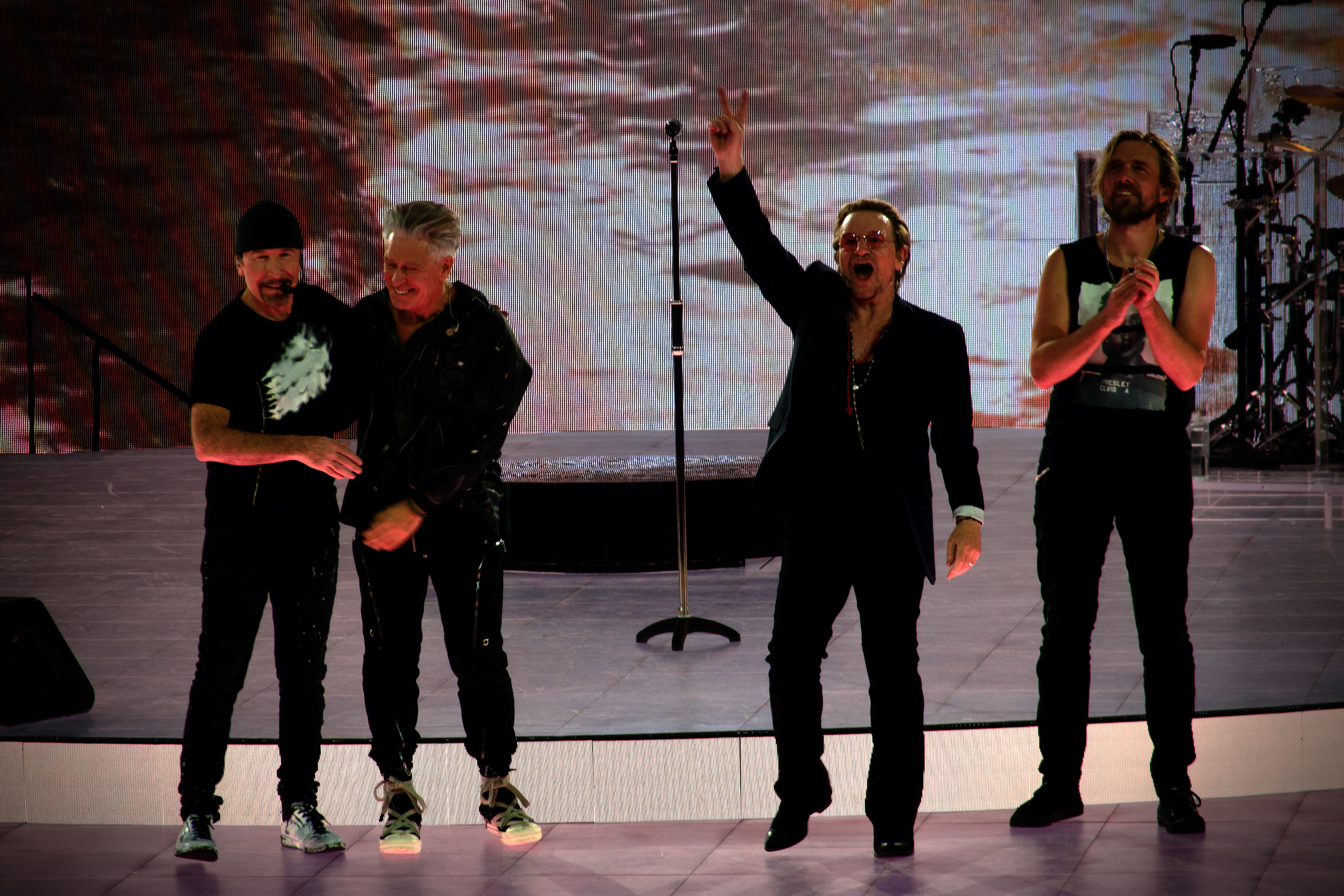
U2 following a 7 October 2023 performance. Temporary drummer Bram van den Berg is on the right.

U2:UV Achtung Baby Live received wide critical acclaim. Many reviews highlighted the successful fusion of U2's anthemic music with the spectacle of the venue. Katie Atkinson of Billboard said, "Sphere never overshadows U2; Sphere magnifies U2, pairing a band that has attempted to innovate with each new tour over their 40-plus-year career with a venue that seemingly has no limits of innovation." Neil McCormick of The Telegraph said, "this spectacular concert will change live entertainment forever", calling it "genuinely astonishing" with "the best visuals and sound you have ever seen and heard". He thought the band used the venue's technology with a "surprising degree of restraint". Alexis Petridis of The Guardian praised the group's performance for retaining spontaneity and rough edges amidst the high-tech production, saying, "This cocktail of eye-popping visuals and slightly unruly performances absolutely works, allaying any concerns that a band from the post-punk era and the old showbiz connotations of a residency in Las Vegas constitute a slightly uncomfortable fit". Melissa Ruggieri of USA Today said: "It's fair to wonder if such a gargantuan production eclipses a band. Not this one. Especially since some of the most moving moments were in the small details and the inherent earnestness of U2's music."

Andy Greene of Rolling Stone said Sphere had "somehow managed to live up to years of hype", adding that "By any measurement, it was a stunning success." He said he could not "imagine a better proof of concept for Sphere than this U2 show", calling it "a quantum leap forward for concerts." Chris Willman of Variety praised the band's creative and production teams for both the impressive visuals and clear sound as well as the minimalism of the stage design. He found the show to be "the apotheosis of a bigger-is-better ethos" the band has followed throughout their career, saying, "It's a cliche to say that U2 can achieve intimacy in the midst of the most ridiculous extravaganza, but nobody in rock history has done a better job of taking visual and aesthetic dynamics to extremes." Mikael Wood of the Los Angeles Times said the show's "production sets a new benchmark for the interplay between humans and technology" and that U2 offered "the sheer obliterating pleasure of sensory overload: a barrage of eye-popping sights and sharply rendered sounds that finds a kind of ecstasy in submission". While he believed U2 risked succumbing to irrelevancy by focusing on an album from their back catalogue, he posited that Achtung Baby may be "just a delivery device, in a post-pandemic age when live music feels more important than it has in decades, for a new way to think about performance". Writing for the Irish Independent, Barry Egan said it may have been one of U2's best and most emotional performances, despite how weird he felt seeing them with a different drummer. In spite of Mullen's absence and the stigma of performing in Las Vegas, Egan felt the band had "proved that any theories of them damaging their reputation were wrong in so many ways".

NME's Damian Jones said, "despite the immense pressure on tonight's opening show, brimming with a who's who of stars... U2 can always be relied upon to deliver a solid state of the art stage show" and that they pulled off "a dazzling series of technological tricks right from the outset". Jones believed the first show achieved "a fine balancing act" of taking live concerts "to the next level" while "ensuring their music remains very much at the forefront". Pat Carty of Hot Press said, "For U2 to take their most painful, emotionally naked album to the altar of fake, a city that art and heart forgot, and then put it up on the largest display in history, and somehow succeed in making it even more intimate may just be the greatest trick they've ever pulled." Brad Auerbach of Spin praised Sphere saying: "The sound was fantastic. The video presentation was truly incomparable. It is doubtful any venue on this planet can match either aspect." Reviewing the performance, he said, "The anticipation of the crowd overcame some trepidation emanating from the band; the four lads seemed a bit uneven, almost by their own admission." Jon Caramanica of The New York Times said that "for all the vividness of the setting, there was still something not quite complete about this performance, which at times was winningly small, at others winningly huge, and at still others a futile ramble". He found many of the visuals to be too cluttered and disorienting, and he judged that the setlist had too many "peaks and valleys" and was impacted by tentative performances. Caramanica said that at times the space between the band, the screen, and the crowd "paralleled the airy emptiness of a corporate convention gig".

=== Accolades and honours ===
Melissa Ruggieri of USA Today ranked U2:UV Achtung Baby Live at Sphere as the top concert of 2023, ahead of shows such as Beyoncé's Renaissance World Tour and Taylor Swift's Eras Tour. Chris Willman of Variety included the opening night of U2's residency on a list of the 25 best concerts of 2023. Consequence included U2's residency on a similar list of the top 15 live shows from the year; writer Maura Fallon said, "There were a lot of impressive shows this year, but few hinted at the technological (and financial) future of concert-going the way U2 at The Sphere did." The residency appeared on Spin's list of the best concerts of 2023; writer Steve Appleford said, "No band was better suited than U2 to christen the Sphere", and that the "deeply emotional songs... were fueled by tension between U2's undiminished raw power and the magnificent and insane high-tech visuals all around them".

U2 won Residency of the Year at the 2024 Pollstar Awards, and were nominated in the same category the following year. For the 2024 TPi Awards, the residency was shortlisted in the Outstanding Event Production of the Year category. For the 2024 Parnelli Awards presented at that year's NAMM Show, Stefaan "Smasher" Desmedt won the award for Video Director of the Year, and Treatment Studio won the award for Media Content Creator of the Year. Several crew members were also nominated for Parnelli Awards: Ethan Weber and Alex Murphy for Lighting Director of the Year; Sarah O'Herlihy for the Patrick Stansfield Tour Manager of the Year award; and Fuse Technical Group for Video Production Company of the Year. At the 2024 Mondo-DR Awards, Fuse Technical Group and YesTech won in the Performance Venue category for the "Turntable" stage. In 2025, Treatment Studio were recognised for their work on the residency with a Webby Award for Best Performance in the AI, Immersive & Games category.

Prior to the final show of the residency, the band members received a key to the Las Vegas Strip from Tick Segerblom of the Clark County Commission.

== Commercial performance ==
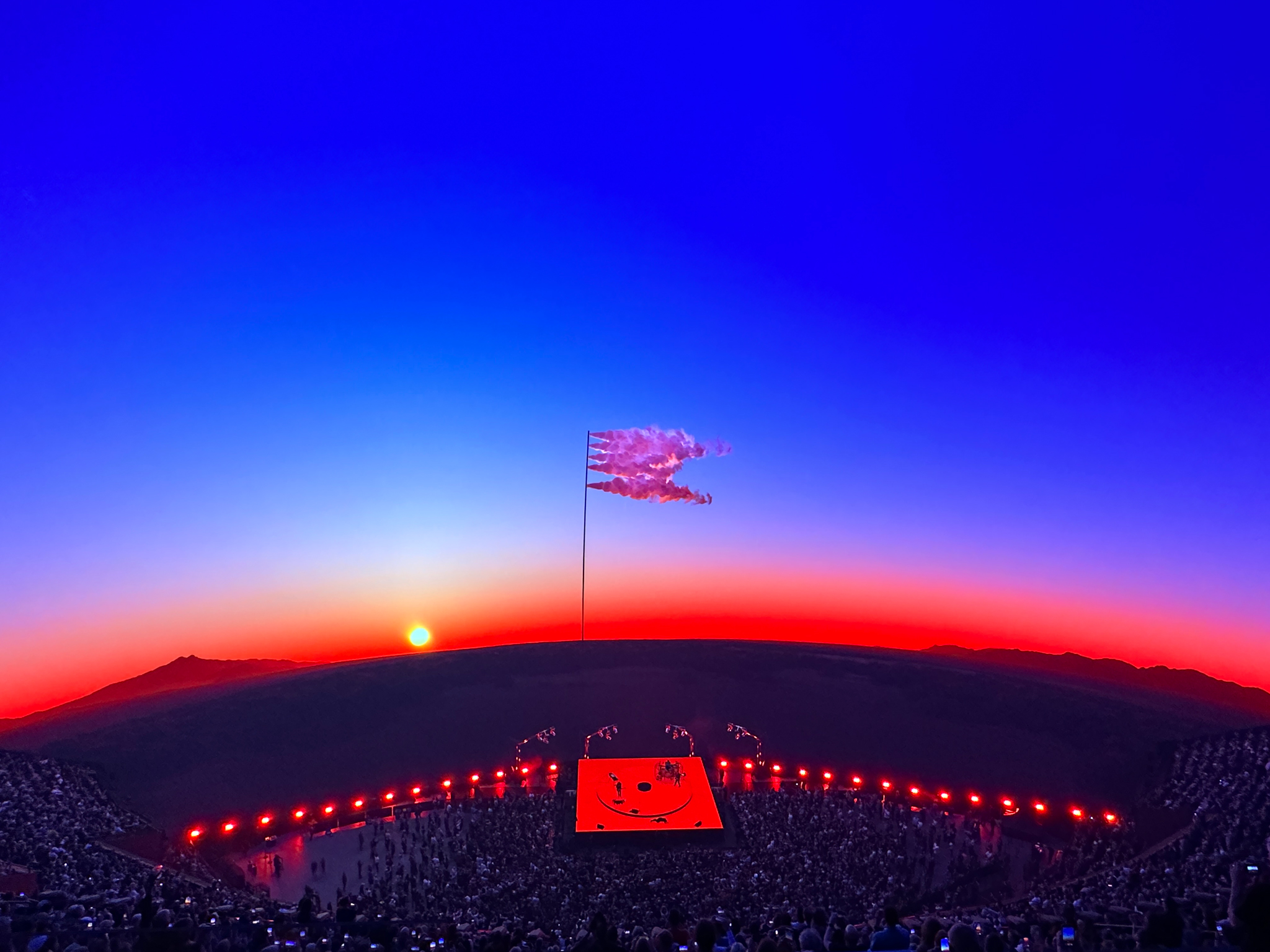
A desert sunrise displayed by the LED screen during a performance of "Where the Streets Have No Name"

According to Pollstar, the first 17 shows grossed $109,751,705 from 280,717 tickets sold; on a per-show basis, this averaged out to $6,455,982 in gross revenue and 16,512 tickets sold, with an average ticket price of $390.97. Billboard called U2:UV Achtung Baby Live the "fastest grossing residency in Boxscore history". For Pollstar's 2023 reporting period, U2's box office earnings from the first 17 shows ranked number one among residencies and among all concert grosses by an act at a single venue. The same 17 shows generated $30.7 million in revenue for Sphere Entertainment, with an average of $1.8 million per show. The final eight shows of 2023 grossed $50,006,654 from 132,693 tickets sold. For the year, the residency grossed $159.8 million and sold 413,410 tickets.

The 10 concerts from February 2024 grossed $56.5 million, ranking atop Billboard's Top Tours list for the month; this made U2 the first Irish artist to top the publication's monthly list and the first act to top the list for a non-tour. The 15 shows held in 2024 grossed $84,720,544 from 249,122 tickets sold.

In total, U2:UV Achtung Baby Live grossed $244,478,903 from 662,532 tickets sold, making it the fourth-highest-grossing concert residency of all time. Of all residencies to gross at least $100 million, it accomplished the feat in by far the fewest shows. It ranks as the third-highest-grossing Las Vegas residency, behind Celine Dion's two runs at the Colosseum at Caesars Palace.

For Billboard Boxscore's 2024 mid-year recap, which covered the reporting period from 1 October 2023 to 30 March 2024, U2's residency led all concert grosses with $231.6 million from the 38 shows during that time. For Pollstar's 2024 mid-year report, which covered the period from 16 November 2023 to 15 May 2024, U2's residency ranked fourth internationally in touring grosses with $134,727,198 from the 23 shows during that time. On Billboard Boxscore's 2024 year-end rankings, U2 placed seventh on the Top Tours list and fourth on the Top Rock Tours list, while occupying the top three spots of the Top Boxscores ranking. On Pollstar's 2024 year-end rankings, U2 had the top-grossing residency for a second consecutive year, held the top two positions on the list of the Top 300 Concert Grosses, and ranked 20th on the list of the top-grossing touring artists globally.

== Broadcasts and concert film ==
A performance of "Atomic City" by U2 at Sphere was included in the telecast of the 66th Annual Grammy Awards on 4 February 2024, in what was billed as the first-ever televised performance from the venue. Afterwards, the band participated in an award presentation, announcing that the winner for Best Pop Vocal Album was Taylor Swift for Midnights.

On 17 March 2024 – St. Patrick's Day – the group's 2 March show was broadcast on their U2-X Radio station on SiriusXM. The show was also broadcast on radio stations in the United Kingdom, Spain, the Netherlands, Japan, Italy, Ireland, Australia, France, Brazil, Mexico, and Germany between April and May 2024. Beginning 3 May, for 48 hours subscribers of U2.com were able to stream audio from the final concert and a video interview of the band with Pauli Lovejoy and Gavin Friday at the Zoo Station exhibit.

=== V-U2 ===
On 21 August 2024, it was announced that an immersive concert film documenting the band's residency, V-U2, would screen exclusively at Sphere. It was directed by Morleigh Steinberg and the Edge, and it is the first film to be shot entirely with the Big Sky camera system. The film leverages the venue's immersive sound system and the haptic capabilities of the seats.

According to the Edge, when the group were considering filming their residency, they realised that "the show [was] so bespoke to this venue that to try and capture it for a small screen just wouldn't make any sense", and they instead pivoted to the idea of "capturing it for the screen it happens to be on right now". Following a test filming of a few concerts early in the residency with traditional cameras, U2's 23–24 February and 1 March 2024 shows were filmed for the project using five Big Sky cameras. The Edge said it was a "thrilling proposition" to try to depict their performance so faithfully that only a few moments in the film would tip off viewers that it was not happening live. Accordingly, the film visually depicts the first four songs from a stable position in the audience before the camera angle shifts. The song "One" begins with a reverse angle showing the audience lighting up the venue with their phones, before switching to a closeup of Bono and then pulling back to a wide shot of the entire band. The moment, suggested by director Mark Pellington and taken from a rehearsal, was intended "to support Bono's onstage storytelling" and break the conceit that an actual live performance was taking place.

U2's creative team collaborated with Sphere Studios on the film, working both in Las Vegas and at Big Dome at Sphere Studios in Burbank. Steinberg and the Edge spent more than two months editing the film at Big Dome, a process that was complicated by limitations in how they could preview their edits; Steinberg said: "You're either looking through an Oculus [headset] or at a very low-resolution image on a monitor. You quickly learn what you might not be seeing and make compensations for that." The Edge said that because the film comprised such a large amount of data, shot editing was the only post-production technique that was feasible, as any other processes would have taken months and required extensive computing power.

After a preview screening for U2 fans on 4 September 2024, the film premiered to the public on 5 September; the opening was accompanied by a drone show depicting the V-U2 logo while footage of a performance of "Zoo Station" played on the exosphere. It was the second film to be released under the "Sphere Experience" program. Screenings of the film were suspended following the August 2025 release of The Wizard of Oz at Sphere.

== Impact ==
On the Monday following U2's opening-weekend shows, the stock price of Sphere Entertainment Co. rose, peaking at a 17.3-percent increase before finishing the day up 11.1 percent. This increased the company's market capitalization by $143.2 million, bringing it to a $1.43 billion valuation.

Treatment Studio used their experience producing visuals for U2:UV Achtung Baby Live at Sphere to aid in their next project at the venue: Dead & Company's 30-show residency Dead Forever, which ran from May to August 2024. Treatment co-founder Sam Pattinson said that because much of the pre-production process for U2's show was spent on technical research and development, the studio had learned enough to be able to focus entirely on creative and production decisions for Dead & Company's residency; Pattinson described it as giving them "a running start". As a result, Dead Forever was developed in less than six months, compared to the 18 months spent on U2's show. Williams, the other co-founder of Treatment, said, "It is very sweet how so many of the principles of the U2 show have become kind of boilerplate for all shows in [Sphere], because that's what works."

In January 2025, the University of Nevada, Las Vegas's College of Fine Arts announced that U2 had made a donation of $300,000. The fund, called the U2:UV Music Scholarship and Experiential Fund, will benefit the students' music education.

Several attendees of U2's inaugural Sphere concert were inspired to stage their own shows at the venue. The heavy metal band Metallica launched their residency, Life Burns Faster, at Sphere in 2026 after their drummer Lars Ulrich was "fucking awestruck" by U2's show. The television host and businesswoman Oprah Winfrey developed a series of shows called AHA, which is scheduled to begin in April 2027.

== Set list ==
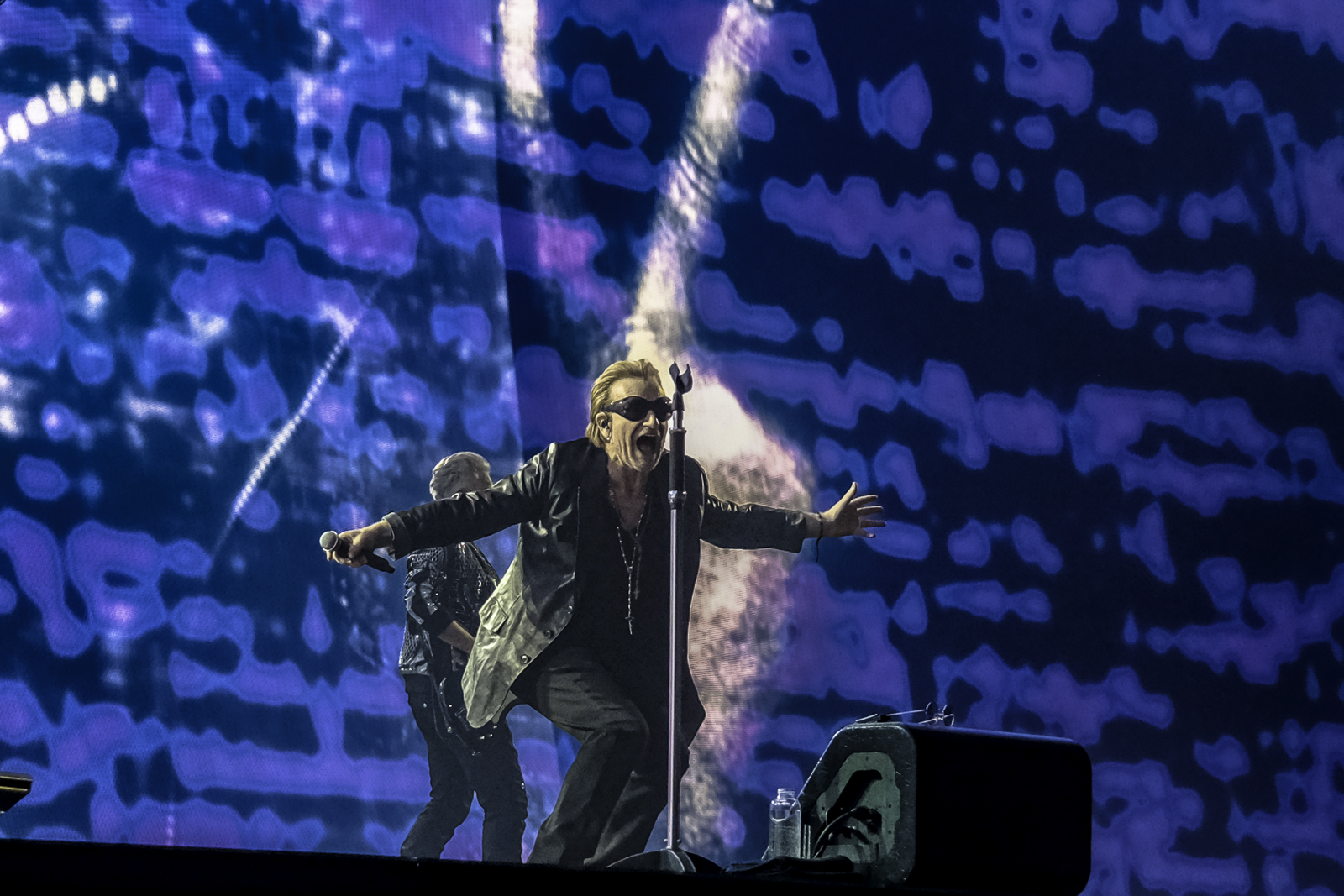
Bono on opening night of the residency. During shows, he reprised his Fly character from the Zoo TV Tour.

The following set list was performed on 29 September 2023 for the residency's opening show:

Achtung Baby Part 1

1. "Zoo Station"
2. "The Fly"
3. "Even Better Than the Real Thing"
4. "Mysterious Ways"
5. "One" (lyrical snippets of "Purple Rain" and "Love Me Tender")
6. "Until the End of the World"
7. "Who's Gonna Ride Your Wild Horses"
8. "Tryin' to Throw Your Arms Around the World"

Turntable segment (Rattle and Hum songs)

9. "All I Want Is You"
10. "Desire" (with lyrical snippet of "Love Me Do")
11. "Angel of Harlem" (with lyrical snippets of "Into the Mystic" and "Dancing in the Moonlight")
12. "Love Rescue Me"

Achtung Baby Part 2

13. "So Cruel"
14. "Acrobat"
15. "Ultraviolet (Light My Way)"
16. "Love Is Blindness" (with lyrical snippet of "Viva Las Vegas")

Encore

17. "Elevation" (with lyrical snippet of "My Way")
18. "Atomic City"
19. "Vertigo"
20. "Where the Streets Have No Name"
21. "With or Without You"
22. "Beautiful Day" (with lyrical snippets of "Sgt. Pepper's Lonely Hearts Club Band (Reprise)" and "Blackbird")

== Concert dates ==
Concert dates for U2:UV Achtung Baby Live at Sphere
Date	Opening act	Attendance	Revenue
29 September 2023	Pauli "the PSM" Lovejoy	280,717	$109,751,705
30 September 2023	Pauli "the PSM" Lovejoy	280,717	$109,751,705
5 October 2023	Pauli "the PSM" Lovejoy	280,717	$109,751,705
7 October 2023	Pauli "the PSM" Lovejoy	280,717	$109,751,705
8 October 2023	Pauli "the PSM" Lovejoy	280,717	$109,751,705
11 October 2023	Pauli "the PSM" Lovejoy	280,717	$109,751,705
13 October 2023	Pauli "the PSM" Lovejoy	280,717	$109,751,705
14 October 2023	Pauli "the PSM" Lovejoy	280,717	$109,751,705
18 October 2023	Pauli "the PSM" Lovejoy	280,717	$109,751,705
20 October 2023	Pauli "the PSM" Lovejoy	280,717	$109,751,705
21 October 2023	Pauli "the PSM" Lovejoy	280,717	$109,751,705
25 October 2023	Pauli "the PSM" Lovejoy	280,717	$109,751,705
27 October 2023	Pauli "the PSM" Lovejoy	280,717	$109,751,705
28 October 2023	Pauli "the PSM" Lovejoy	280,717	$109,751,705
1 November 2023	Pauli "the PSM" Lovejoy	280,717	$109,751,705
3 November 2023	Pauli "the PSM" Lovejoy	280,717	$109,751,705
4 November 2023	Pauli "the PSM" Lovejoy	280,717	$109,751,705
1 December 2023	Pauli "the PSM" Lovejoy	132,693	$50,006,654
2 December 2023	Pauli "the PSM" Lovejoy	132,693	$50,006,654
6 December 2023	Pauli "the PSM" Lovejoy	132,693	$50,006,654
8 December 2023	Pauli "the PSM" Lovejoy	132,693	$50,006,654
9 December 2023	Pauli "the PSM" Lovejoy	132,693	$50,006,654
13 December 2023	Pauli "the PSM" Lovejoy	132,693	$50,006,654
15 December 2023	Pauli "the PSM" Lovejoy	132,693	$50,006,654
16 December 2023	Pauli "the PSM" Lovejoy	132,693	$50,006,654
26 January 2024	Pauli "the PSM" Lovejoy	249,122	$84,720,544
27 January 2024	Pauli "the PSM" Lovejoy	249,122	$84,720,544
31 January 2024	Pauli "the PSM" Lovejoy	249,122	$84,720,544
2 February 2024	Pauli "the PSM" Lovejoy	249,122	$84,720,544
3 February 2024	Pauli "the PSM" Lovejoy	249,122	$84,720,544
7 February 2024	Pauli "the PSM" Lovejoy	249,122	$84,720,544
9 February 2024	Pauli "the PSM" Lovejoy	249,122	$84,720,544
10 February 2024	Pauli "the PSM" Lovejoy	249,122	$84,720,544
15 February 2024	Pauli "the PSM" Lovejoy	249,122	$84,720,544
17 February 2024	Pauli "the PSM" Lovejoy	249,122	$84,720,544
18 February 2024	Pauli "the PSM" Lovejoy	249,122	$84,720,544
23 February 2024	Pauli "the PSM" Lovejoy	249,122	$84,720,544
24 February 2024	Pauli "the PSM" Lovejoy	249,122	$84,720,544
1 March 2024	Pauli "the PSM" Lovejoy	249,122	$84,720,544
2 March 2024	Pauli "the PSM" Lovejoy	249,122	$84,720,544
Total		662,532	$244,478,903

== See also ==
- List of most-attended concert series at a single venue
