= Who's Gonna Ride Your Wild Horses =

1992 single by U2

Single by U2

from the album Achtung Baby
- B-side: "Paint It Black"; "Fortunate Son"
- Released: 23 November 1992
- Recorded: 1991
- Genre: Alternative rock, pop rock
- Length: 5:16 (album version); 3:54 (Temple Bar edit)
- Label: Island
- Composer: U2
- Lyricist: Bono
- Producers: Steve Lillywhite; Daniel Lanois; Brian Eno

U2 singles chronology
"Even Better Than the Real Thing" (1992)	"Who's Gonna Ride Your Wild Horses" (1992)	"Numb" (1993)

Music video
- "Who's Gonna Ride Your Wild Horses" on YouTube

"Who's Gonna Ride Your Wild Horses" is a song by Irish rock band U2. It is the fifth track on their seventh album, Achtung Baby (1991), and was released as its fifth and final single in November 1992 by Island Records.

== Writing and recording ==
"Who's Gonna Ride Your Wild Horses" began as a demo that the band recorded at STS Studios in 1990. The band worked on it during the formal Achtung Baby sessions, including several failed attempts at Hansa Studios in Berlin. This produced several versions of the song and about a dozen mixes. However, the original demo remained their preferred version. Producer Jimmy Iovine, in particular, expressed his preference for the demo version when lead vocalist Bono played it for him. During the group's time recording in Dublin in 1991, producer Steve Lillywhite was brought on to provide a "fresh pair of ears" and mix the song. The album version most closely resembles the original demo.

Lillywhite recalls that, "They hated that song. I spent a month on it and I still don't think it was as realised as it could've been. The Americans had heard it and said, 'That's your radio song there', because they were having trouble with some of the more industrial elements [of the album]. It's almost like a covers band doing a U2 moment. Maybe we tried too hard." Bono said, "It's a song I feel we didn't quite nail on the record because there was another whole set of lyrics that were dumped and I wrote those quickly and off we went." The band later released an alternately arranged "Temple Bar Remix" as the single, the version of the song they most prefer. The band also has claimed they find the song difficult to perform in concert. Bassist Adam Clayton said, "It's a great torch song, with melody and emotion, but I don't think we ever captured it again and we have never really been able to play the song live."

== Single release ==
When the covers to "Even Better Than the Real Thing", "The Fly", "Who's Gonna Ride Your Wild Horses", and "Mysterious Ways" are arranged, a picture of the band members driving a Trabant is formed. The single includes Bono's solo version of "Can't Help Falling in Love", which was recorded in STS studios in Dublin on 29 June 1992 for the movie Honeymoon in Vegas. The song was released in the United Kingdom on 23 November 1992.

== Live performances ==
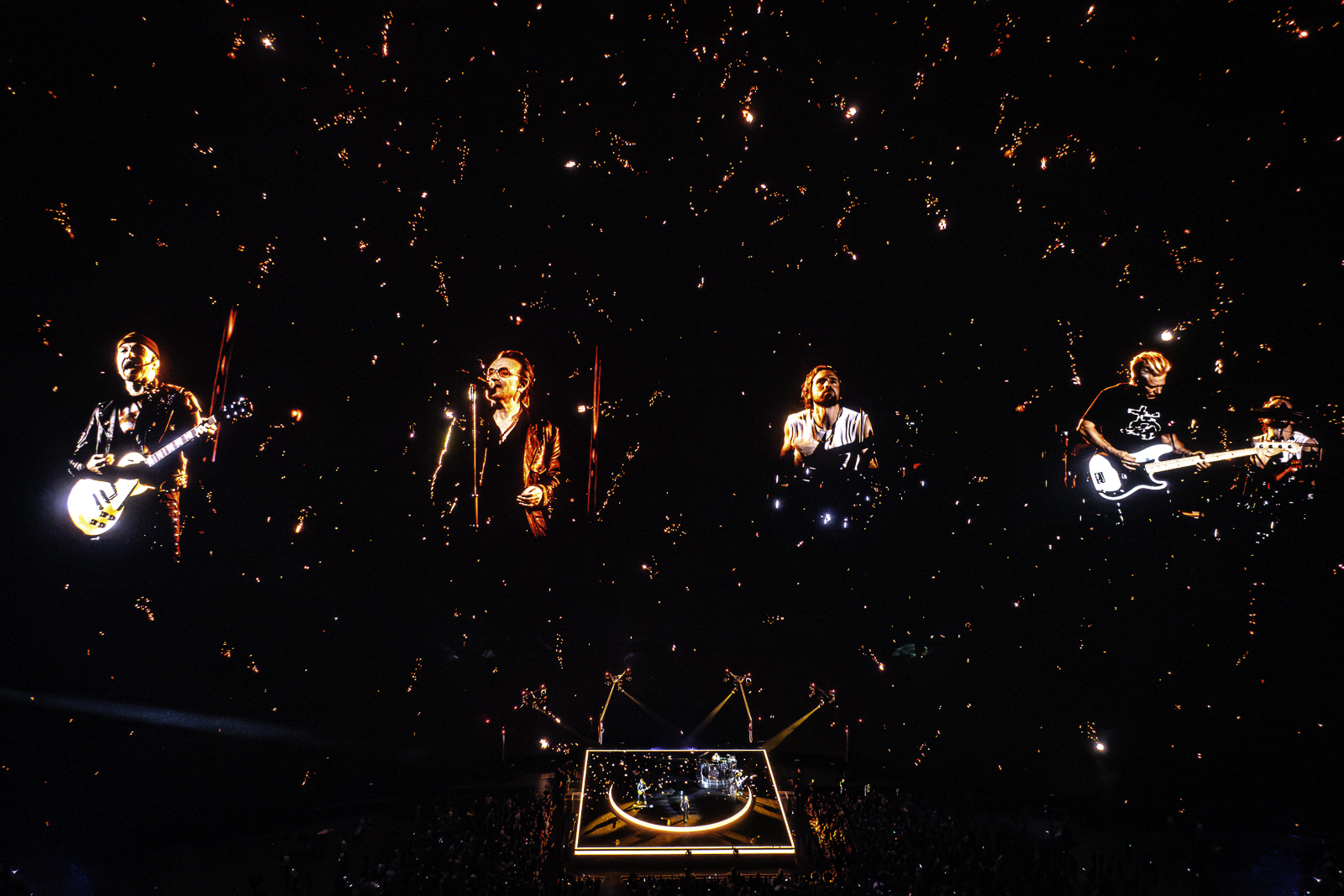
U2 performed the song during their 2023–2024 concert residency at the Sphere, with the LED screen displaying visuals of falling embers.

The song was performed in full during the first two legs and the first show of the third leg during the Zoo TV Tour in 1992, often featuring extended bridges or extra solos by The Edge. It made a few appearances during the rest of the tour in a shorter, solo acoustic form. Lines from the song were added at the end of their song "Bad" during the final leg of the Elevation Tour. During the Vertigo Tour, the song has appeared on several occasions, first in an electric version similar to the album version, and later in an acoustic version somewhat reminiscent of the "Temple Bar Remix" used for the single. Thirteen years later, the song became an integral part of the so-called "Zoo Suite" during the Experience + Innocence Tour in 2018. U2 performed "Who's Gonna Ride Your Wild Horses" during their 2023–2024 U2:UV Achtung Baby residency at the Sphere in the Las Vegas Valley. During the performances, the venue's LED screen displayed flaming embers falling from the ceiling, as closeups of the band members were also shown.

== Garbage cover version ==
Garbage reworked the song for the 2011 tribute album AHK-toong BAY-bi Covered. "Achtung Baby was a huge influence on the first Garbage album," remarked Butch Vig. "It's groovy and gritty, hi-fi and lo-fi, industrial and orchestral. We picked this song because we love the lyrics. We stripped the verses down and changed the major chord to minor chord, which makes the lyrics more bittersweet. We were in the studio making the new Garbage album at the time; this was a good distraction."

On 29 November 2024, the track featured on Garbage's covers compilation Copy/Paste.

== Formats and track listings ==
7" release
No.	Title	Length
1.	"Who's Gonna Ride Your Wild Horses" (Temple Bar edit)	3:54
2.	"Paint It Black"	3:22

Cassette release
No.	Title	Length
1.	"Who's Gonna Ride Your Wild Horses" (Temple Bar edit)	3:54
2.	"Paint It Black"	3:22
3.	"Fortunate Son"	2:39

12" and CD release
No.	Title	Length
1.	"Who's Gonna Ride Your Wild Horses" (Temple Bar edit)	3:54
2.	"Paint It Black"	3:22
3.	"Fortunate Son"	2:39
4.	"Who's Gonna Ride Your Wild Horses" (Temple Bar remix)	4:49

CD release (UK, France, and Australia)
No.	Title	Length
1.	"Who's Gonna Ride Your Wild Horses" (Temple Bar edit)	3:54
2.	"Paint It Black"	3:22
3.	"Salomé" (Zooromancer remix)	8:02
4.	"Can't Help Falling in Love" (Triple Peaks remix)	4:34

== Personnel ==
- Bono - vocals, acoustic guitar
- The Edge - guitars, keyboards, backing vocals
- Adam Clayton - bass
- Larry Mullen Jr. - drums

== Charts ==
=== Weekly charts ===
Chart (1992–1993)	Peak position
Australia (ARIA)	9
Austria (Ö3 Austria Top 40)	20
Belgium (Ultratop 50 Flanders)	32
Canada Top Singles (RPM)	5
Europe (Eurochart Hot 100)	20
Finland (Suomen virallinen lista)	5
Germany (GfK)	48
Ireland (IRMA)	4
Italy (Musica e dischi)	3
Netherlands (Dutch Top 40)	13
Netherlands (Single Top 100)	14
New Zealand (Recorded Music NZ)	13
Norway (VG-lista)	10
Portugal (AFP)	2
Sweden (Sverigetopplistan)	19
Switzerland (Schweizer Hitparade)	24
UK Singles (Official Charts)	14
UK Airplay (Music Week)	4
US Billboard Hot 100	35
US Alternative Airplay (Billboard)	7
US Mainstream Rock Airplay (Billboard)	2
US Pop Airplay (Billboard)	28

=== Year-end charts ===
Chart (1992)	Position
Canada Top Singles (RPM)	63

Chart (1993)	Position
Canada Top Singles (RPM)	41

== Release history ==
Region	Date	Format(s)	Label(s)	Ref.
United Kingdom	23 November 1992	7-inch vinyl; CD1; cassette	Island	
Japan	26 November 1992	CD	Island	
United Kingdom	30 November 1992	CD2	Island	
Australia	30 November 1992	7-inch vinyl; CD; cassette	Island	

== See also ==
- List of covers of U2 songs - Who's Gonna Ride Your Wild Horses
