= AHK-toong BAY-bi Covered =

Compilation album by various artists
- Released: 25 October 2011
- Genre: Rock
- Length: 59:25
- Label: Mercury; Interscope; Universal

AHK-toong BAY-bi Covered, stylized as (Ăhk-to͝ong Ba͞y-bi) Covered or (Ăℎk-to͝ong Ba͞y-bi) Covered, is a tribute album featuring cover versions of the 12 songs from U2's 1991 record Achtung Baby. It was released on 25 October 2011 as a pack-in CD with the December 2011 issue of Q (issue #305). The magazine commissioned the album to commemorate the 20th anniversary of Achtung Baby's original release and Q's 25th anniversary. The magazine's editor-in-chief Paul Rees said, "This is an entirely appropriate way to mark Q's anniversary and that of Achtung Baby, one of the pivotal albums in our lifetime." The performing artists are a mix of U2's contemporaries and successors, including Jack White, Patti Smith, Snow Patrol, Nine Inch Nails, Depeche Mode, The Killers, Garbage and Glasvegas. Although a tribute album, AHK-toong BAY-bi Covered contains a remix of "Even Better Than the Real Thing" that is credited as performed by U2.

On 15 November 2011, the album was made available via digital download through the iTunes Store. All proceeds from digital sales will go to Concern Worldwide, an Ireland-based non-profit organisation that provides aid to the world's poorest countries. Concern's CEO Tom Arnold said, "Offering the proceeds from (Ahk-toong Bay-Bi) Covered to Concern's East Africa appeal also provides a timely reminder that alleviation of the hunger and wider health crisis in the region must not be forgotten and should remain a global priority." Arnold said he was taken aback but delighted when he was asked by U2 lead singer Bono if his organisation would accept all proceeds from sales of the tribute album.

The album debuted at number 53 in the United States with 12,000 copies sold in the first week, and it debuted at number 46 in Canada.

== Track listing ==
No.	Title	Performed by	Length
1.	"Zoo Station"	Nine Inch Nails	6:28
2.	"Even Better Than the Real Thing" (Jacques Lu Cont Mix)	U2	6:39
3.	"One"	Damien Rice	5:26
4.	"Until the End of the World"	Patti Smith	3:36
5.	"Who's Gonna Ride Your Wild Horses"	Garbage	5:16
6.	"So Cruel"	Depeche Mode	6:02
7.	"The Fly"	Gavin Friday	4:16
8.	"Mysterious Ways"	Snow Patrol	4:48
9.	"Tryin' to Throw Your Arms Around the World"	The Fray	4:33
10.	"Ultraviolet (Light My Way)"	The Killers	4:53
11.	"Acrobat"	Glasvegas	4:08
12.	"Love Is Blindness"	Jack White	3:20

== Chart performance ==
Chart (2011)	Peak position
Canadian Albums (Billboard)	46
US Billboard 200	53
