= Achtung Baby =

1991 studio album by U2

Studio album by U2
- Released: 18 November 1991
- Recorded: October 1990 – September 1991
- Studios: Hansa (Berlin); Elsinore (Dalkey) (Note: The recording location is credited in the album's liner notes as "Dog Town", based on the band's nickname for the house. Its official name is Elsinore.); STS (Dublin); Windmill Lane (Dublin)
- Genre: Alternative rock
- Length: 55:27
- Label: Island
- Producers: Daniel Lanois; Brian Eno

U2 chronology
Rattle and Hum (1988)	Achtung Baby (1991)	Zooropa (1993)

Singles from Achtung Baby
- 1. "The Fly" Released: 21 October 1991; 2. "Mysterious Ways" Released: 2 December 1991; 3. "One" Released: 24 February 1992; 4. "Even Better Than the Real Thing" Released: 8 June 1992; 5. "Who's Gonna Ride Your Wild Horses" Released: 23 November 1992

Achtung Baby (/ˈɑːxtʊŋ/ AHKH-toong) is the seventh studio album by the Irish rock band U2. It was produced by Daniel Lanois and Brian Eno, and was released on 18 November 1991 by Island Records. After criticism of their 1988 documentary film and album Rattle and Hum and a sense of creative stagnation, U2 shifted their direction to incorporate influences from alternative, industrial, and electronic dance music into their sound. Thematically, Achtung Baby is darker, more introspective, and at times more flippant than their previous work. For his lyrics, lead vocalist Bono was partly inspired by the failed marriages of two friends, including U2's guitarist the Edge.

Seeking inspiration from German reunification, U2 began recording Achtung Baby at Berlin's Hansa Studios in October 1990. The sessions were fraught with conflict, as the band argued over their musical direction and the quality of their material. After tension and slow progress nearly prompted the group to disband, they made a breakthrough with the improvised writing of the song "One". Morale and productivity improved during subsequent recording sessions in Dublin, where the album was completed in 1991. To confound the public's expectations of the band and their music, U2 chose the record's facetious title and colourful multi-image sleeve.

Achtung Baby is one of U2's most successful records; it received favourable reviews and debuted at number one on the US Billboard 200 Top Albums, while topping the charts in many other countries. Five songs were released as commercial singles, all of which were chart successes, including "One", "Mysterious Ways", and "The Fly". The album has sold 18 million copies worldwide and won a Grammy Award in 1993 for Best Rock Performance by a Duo or Group with Vocal. The album and its supporting Zoo TV Tour of 1992–1993 were central to the group's 1990s reinvention in musical style and in their shift from an earnest public image to a more lighthearted, ironic one. The tour was also a success, grossing US$151 million from 5.3 million tickets sold.

Achtung Baby has since been acclaimed by writers and music critics as one of the greatest albums of all time. The record has been reissued several times, including in October 2011 and November 2021 for its 20th and 30th anniversaries, respectively. U2 commemorated the album during their concert residency U2:UV Achtung Baby Live, which ran from 2023 to 2024 at Sphere in the Las Vegas Valley.

== Background ==
After U2's 1987 album The Joshua Tree and the supporting Joshua Tree Tour brought them critical acclaim and commercial success, their 1988 double album and documentary film Rattle and Hum precipitated a critical backlash. Although the record sold 14 million copies and performed well on music charts, critics were dismissive of it and the film, labelling the band's exploration of early American music as "pretentious" and "misguided and bombastic". U2's high exposure and their reputation for being overly serious led to accusations of grandiosity and self-righteousness.

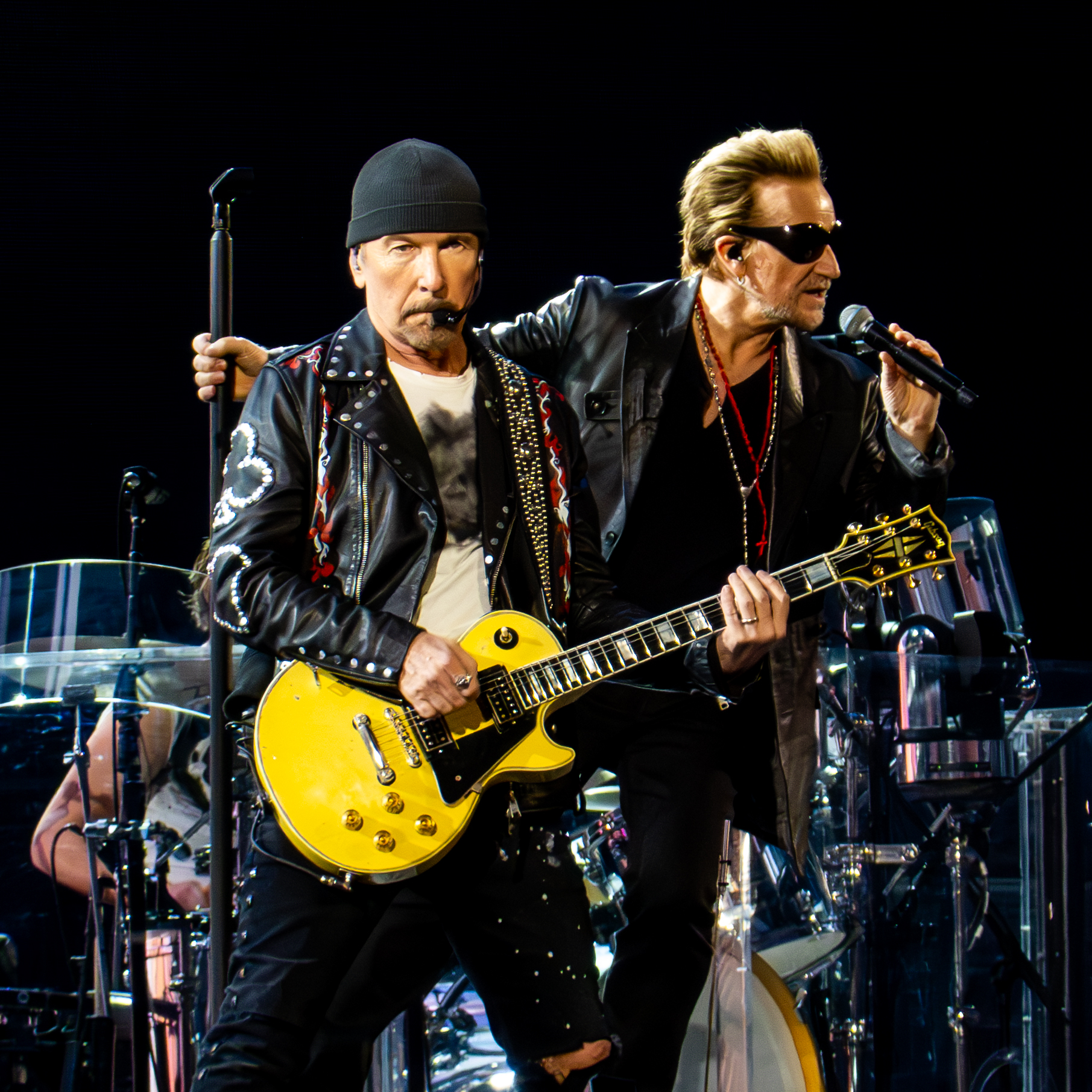
Prior to recording Achtung Baby, the Edge and Bono (pictured in 2024) began working more closely together on songwriting without the other band members.

Despite their commercial popularity, the group were dissatisfied creatively; lead vocalist Bono believed they were musically unprepared for their success, while drummer Larry Mullen, Jr. said, "We were the biggest, but we weren't the best." By the band's 1989 Lovetown Tour, they had become bored with playing their greatest hits. U2 believed that audiences misunderstood the group's collaboration with blues musician B. B. King on Rattle and Hum and the Lovetown Tour, and they described it as "an excursion down a dead-end street". Bono said that, in retrospect, listening to black music enabled the group to create a work such as Achtung Baby, while their experiences with folk music helped him to develop as a lyricist. During a 30 December 1989 show near the end of the Lovetown Tour, Bono said on stage to the hometown crowd in Dublin that it was "the end of something for U2", and that "we have to go away and ... dream it all up again". Following the tour, the group began what was at the time their longest break from public performances and album releases.

Reacting to their own sense of musical stagnation and to their critics, U2 searched for new musical ground. They had written "God Part II" from Rattle and Hum after realising they had excessively pursued nostalgia in their songwriting. The song had a more contemporary feel that Bono said was closer to Achtung Baby's direction. Further indications of change were two recordings they made in 1990: the first was a cover version of "Night and Day" for the first Red Hot + Blue release, in which U2 used electronic dance beats and hip-hop elements for the first time; the second indication of change was contributions made by Bono and guitarist the Edge to the original score of A Clockwork Orange's stage adaptation. Much of the material they wrote was experimental, and according to Bono, "prepar[ed] the ground for Achtung Baby". Ideas deemed inappropriate for the play were put aside for the band's use. During this period, Bono and the Edge began increasingly writing songs together without Mullen or bassist Adam Clayton.

In mid-1990, Bono reviewed material he had written in Australia on the Lovetown Tour, and the group recorded demos at STS Studios in Dublin. The demos later evolved into the songs "Who's Gonna Ride Your Wild Horses", "Until the End of the World", "Even Better Than the Real Thing", and "Mysterious Ways". After their time at STS Studios, Bono and the Edge were tasked with continuing to work on lyrics and melodies until the group reconvened. Going into the album sessions, U2 wanted the record to completely deviate from their past work, but they were unsure how to accomplish it. The emergence of the Madchester scene in the UK left them confused about how they would fit into any particular musical scene.

== Recording and production ==
Buzzwords on this record were trashy, throwaway, dark, sexy, and industrial (all good) and earnest, polite, sweet, righteous, rockist and linear (all bad). It was good if a song took you on a journey or made you think your hifi was broken, bad if it reminded you of recording studios or U2. Sly Stone, T. Rex, Scott Walker, My Bloody Valentine, KMFDM, the Young Gods, Alan Vega, Al Green, and Insekt were all in favour. And Berlin ... became a conceptual backdrop for the record. The Berlin of the Thirties—decadent, sexual and dark—resonating against the Berlin of the Nineties—reborn, chaotic and optimistic ...

— Brian Eno, on Achtung Baby

U2 hired Daniel Lanois and Brian Eno to produce the album, based on the duo's prior work with the band on The Unforgettable Fire and The Joshua Tree. Lanois was principal producer, with Mark "Flood" Ellis as engineer. Eno took on an assisting role, working with the group in the studio for a week at a time to review their songs before leaving for a month or two. Eno said his role was "to come in and erase anything that sounded too much like U2". By distancing himself from the work, he believed he provided the band with a fresh perspective on their material each time he rejoined them. As he explained, "I would deliberately not listen to the stuff in between visits, so I could go in cold". Since U2 wanted the record to be harder-hitting and live-sounding, Lanois "push[ed] the performance aspect very hard, often to the point of recklessness". The Lanois–Eno team used lateral thinking and a philosophical approach—popularised by Eno's Oblique Strategies—that contrasted with the direct and retro style of Rattle and Hum producer Jimmy Iovine.

=== Berlin sessions ===
The band believed that "domesticity [w]as the enemy of rock 'n' roll" and that to work on the album, they needed to remove themselves from their normal family-oriented routines. With a "New Europe" emerging at the end of the Cold War, they chose Berlin, in the centre of the reuniting continent, as a source of inspiration for a more European musical aesthetic. They chose to record at Hansa Studios in West Berlin, near the recently opened Berlin Wall. Several acclaimed records were made at Hansa, including two from David Bowie's "Berlin Trilogy" with Eno, and Iggy Pop's Lust for Life. U2 arrived on 3 October 1990 on the last flight into East Berlin on the eve of German reunification. While looking for public celebrations, they mistakenly ended up joining an anti-unification protest by Communists. Expecting to be inspired in Berlin, U2 instead found the city to be depressing and gloomy. The collapse of the Berlin Wall had resulted in a state of malaise in Germany. The band found their East Berlin hotel to be dismal and the winter inhospitable, while the location of Hansa's Studio 2 in a former SS ballroom, the Meistersaal, added to the "bad vibe". Complicating matters, the studios had been neglected for years, forcing Eno and Lanois to import recording equipment.

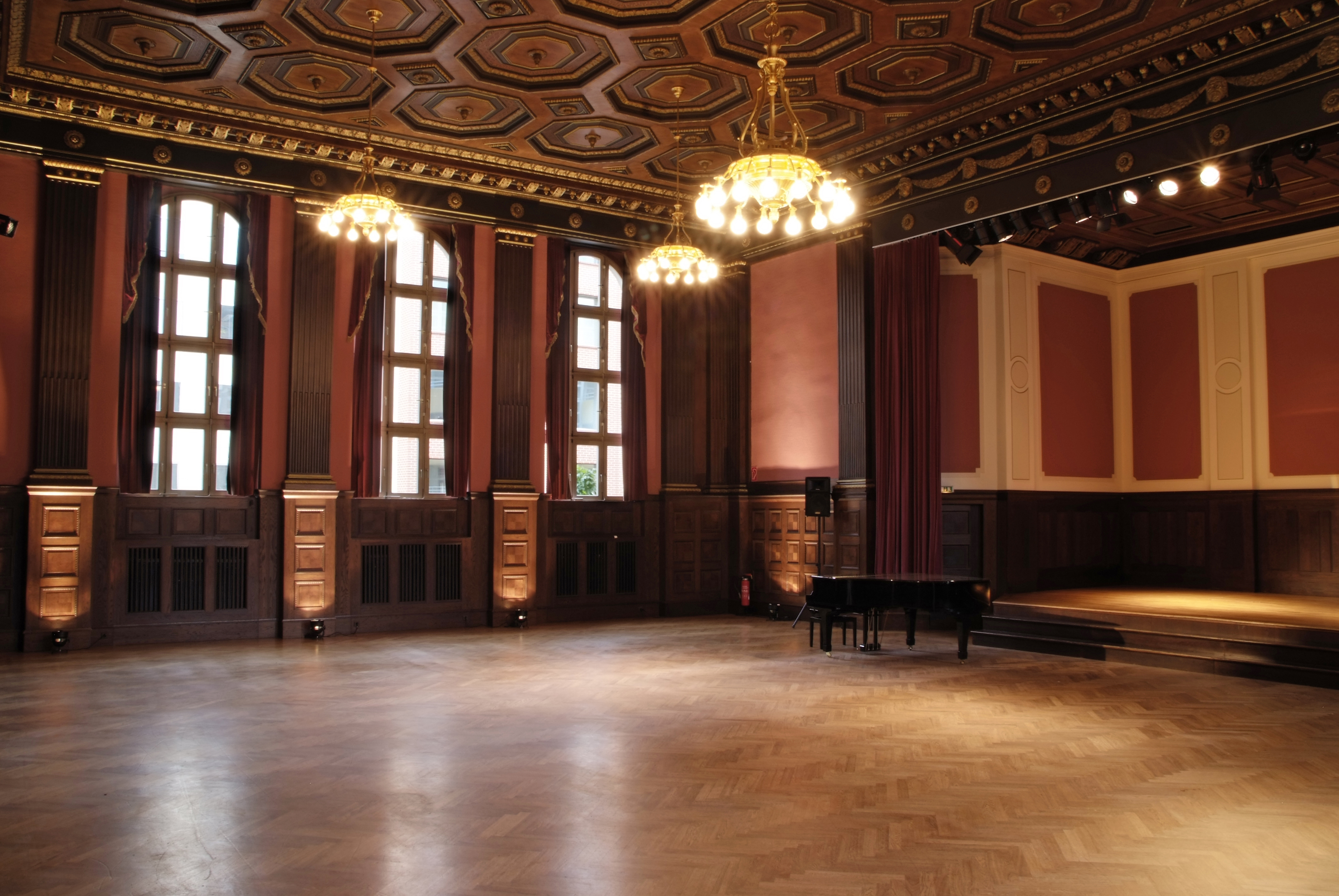
The initial recording sessions took place at Berlin's Hansa Studios in late 1990 in the Meistersaal, a former SS ballroom.

Morale worsened once the sessions commenced, as the band worked long days but could not agree on a musical direction. The Edge had been listening to electronic dance music and to industrial bands like Einstürzende Neubauten, Nine Inch Nails, the Young Gods, and KMFDM. He and Bono advocated new musical directions along these lines. In contrast, Mullen was listening to classic rock acts such as Blind Faith, Cream, and Jimi Hendrix, and he was learning how to "play around the beat". Like Clayton, he was more comfortable with a sound similar to U2's previous work and was resistant to the proposed innovations. Further, the Edge's interest in dance club mixes and drum machines made Mullen feel that his contributions as a drummer were being diminished. Lanois was expecting the "textural and emotional and cinematic U2" of The Unforgettable Fire and The Joshua Tree, and he did not understand the "throwaway, trashy kinds of things" on which Bono and the Edge were working. Compounding the divisions between the two camps was a change in the band's songwriting relationship; Bono and the Edge were working more closely together, writing material without the rest of the group.

At the instant we were recording it, I got a very strong sense of its power. We were all playing together in the big recording room, a huge, eerie ballroom full of ghosts of the war, and everything fell into place. It was a reassuring moment, when everyone finally went, 'oh great, this album has started.' It's the reason you're in a band—when the spirit descends upon you and you create something truly affecting. 'One' is an incredibly moving piece. It hits straight into the heart.

— The Edge, on the recording of "One"

U2 found that they were neither prepared nor well-rehearsed, and that their ideas were not evolving into completed songs. The group were unable to reach consensus during their disagreements and felt that they were not making progress. Bono and Lanois, in particular, had an argument that almost came to blows during the writing of "Mysterious Ways". During one tense session, Clayton removed his bass guitar and held it out to Bono, saying, "You tell me what to play and I'll play it. You want to play it yourself? Go ahead." With a sense of going nowhere, the band considered breaking up. Eno visited for a few days, and understanding their attempts to deconstruct the band, he assured them that their progress was better than they thought. By adding unusual effects and sounds, he showed that the Edge's pursuit for new sonic territory was not incompatible with Mullen's and Lanois' "desire to hold on to solid song structures". Ultimately, a breakthrough was achieved with the writing of the song "One". While working on "Sick Puppy"—an early version of "Mysterious Ways"—the Edge played two separate chord progressions sequentially on guitar at Lanois' encouragement, and finding inspiration, the group quickly improvised a new song that became "One". It provided reassurance and validated their long-standing "blank page approach" to writing and recording together.

U2 returned to Dublin for Christmas, where they discussed their future together and all recommitted to the group. Listening to the tapes, they agreed their material sounded better than they originally thought. They briefly returned to Berlin in January 1991 to finish their work at Hansa. Reflecting on their time in Berlin, Clayton called the sessions a "baptism of fire" and said, "It was something that we had to go through to realize that really, what we were looking for and what we were trying to get to was not something you could find physically, outside of ourselves, in some other city—that there was no magic to it. We had to actually just put the work in and figure out the ideas and hone those ideas down." Although just two songs were delivered during their two months in Berlin, the Edge said that in retrospect, working there had been more productive and inspirational than the output had suggested. The band had been removed from a familiar environment, providing what they described as a certain "texture and cinematic location", and many of their incomplete ideas would be revisited in the subsequent Dublin sessions with success.

=== Dublin sessions ===
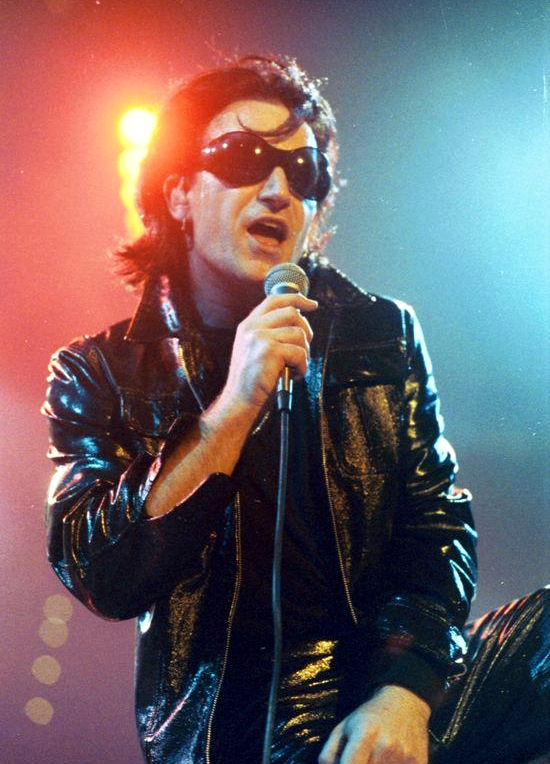
Bono in 1992 as his persona "The Fly", a leather-clad egomaniac meant to parody rock stardom. He conceived this character during the band's 1991 recording sessions in Dublin.

In February 1991, U2 moved the album's recording sessions to the seaside manor Elsinore in the Dublin suburb of Dalkey, renting the house for £10,000 per month. The band nicknamed the house "Dog Town" for the "tackiness" of its exterior dog kennels, and the location was credited as such in the album notes. Lanois' strategy to record in houses, mansions, or castles was something he believed brought atmosphere to the recordings. The group rented recording equipment from Dublin audio services company Audio Engineering, and they used a converted garage as a recording space, diagonally beneath the control room. Video cameras and TV monitors were used to monitor and communicate between the spaces. With Elsinore located within walking distance of Bono's and the Edge's homes, the sessions there were more relaxed and productive. The band struggled with one particular song—later released as the B-side "Lady With the Spinning Head"—but three separate tracks, "The Fly", "Ultraviolet (Light My Way)" and "Zoo Station", were derived from it. During the writing of "The Fly", Bono created a persona based on an oversized pair of black sunglasses that he wore to lighten the mood in the studio. The character, which he also named "The Fly", evolved into a leather-clad egomaniac meant to parody rock stardom. Bono assumed this alter ego for the band's subsequent public appearances and live performances on the Zoo TV Tour.

In April, tapes from the earlier Berlin sessions were stolen after the band reportedly left them in a hotel room, and they were subsequently leaked before the album was finished. The recordings were bootlegged into a three-disc collection dubbed Salome: The [Axtung Beibi] Outtakes, named for the song "Salomé" that was prominently featured in the collection but did not make the album's final cut. The release is considered the most famous bootleg of U2 material. Bono dismissed the leaked demos as "gobbledygook", and the Edge likened the situation to "being violated". The leak shook U2's confidence and soured their collective mood for a few weeks.

Staffing schedules led to the band having a surplus of engineers at one point, and as a result, they split recording between Elsinore and the Edge's home studio to increase productivity. Engineer Robbie Adams said the approach raised morale and activity levels: "There was always something different to listen to, always something exciting happening." The band's desire to record everything they played in the studio posed a challenge to the production team. A conventional setup with their equipment would have restricted them to 24 tracks of audio; to capture multiple overdubs and takes for different arrangement possibilities, the engineers utilised a technique they called "fatting", which allowed them to achieve more than 48 tracks of audio by using an Otari MTR100 24-track recorder, a Fostex D20 timecode-capable DAT recorder, and an Adams Smith Zeta Three synchroniser. The focus on capturing the band's material and encouraging the best performances meant that little attention was paid to combating audio spill, aside from placing the Edge's and Clayton's amplifiers in separate rooms. In issue 14 of U2's fan magazine Propaganda, Lanois said that he believed some of the in-progress songs would become worldwide hits, despite lyrics and vocal takes being unfinished.

During the Dublin sessions, Eno was sent tapes of the previous two months' work, which he called a "total disaster". Joining U2 in the studio, he stripped away what he thought to be excessive overdubbing. The group believes his intervention saved the album. Eno theorised that the band was too close to their music, explaining: "if you know a piece of music terribly well and the mix changes and the bass guitar goes very quiet, you still hear the bass. You're so accustomed to it being there that you compensate and remake it in your mind." Eno also assisted them through a crisis point one month before the recording deadline; he recalled that "everything seemed like a mess", and he insisted the band take a two-week holiday. The break gave them a clearer perspective and added decisiveness.

After work at Elsinore finished in July, the sessions moved to Windmill Lane Studios where Eno, Flood, Lanois, and previous U2 producer Steve Lillywhite mixed the tracks. Each producer created his own mixes of the songs, and the band either picked the version they preferred or requested that certain aspects of each be combined. Additional recording and mixing continued at a frenetic pace until the 21 September deadline, including last-minute changes to "The Fly", "One", and "Mysterious Ways". The Edge estimated that half of the sessions' work was done in the last three weeks to finalise songs. The final night was spent devising a running order for the record. The following day, the Edge travelled to Los Angeles with the album's tapes for mastering.

== Composition ==
=== Music ===
We're at a point where production has gotten so slick that people don't trust it anymore ... We were starting to lose trust in the conventional sound of rock & roll—the conventional sound of guitar ... those big reverb-laden drum sounds of the '80s or those big, beautiful, pristine vocal sounds with all this lush ambience and reverb. So we found ourselves searching for other sounds that had more life and more freshness.

— The Edge, explaining the band's motivation for seeking a new sound

U2 is credited with composing the music for all of Achtung Baby's tracks, despite periods of separated songwriting. They wrote the music primarily through jam sessions, a common practice for them. The album represents a deviation from the sound of their past work; the songs are less anthemic in nature, and their musical style demonstrates a more European aesthetic, introducing influences from alternative rock, industrial music, and electronic dance music. The band referred to the album's musical departure as "the sound of four men chopping down The Joshua Tree". Accordingly, the distorted introduction to the opening track "Zoo Station" was intended to make listeners think the record was broken or was mistakenly not the new U2 album. Author Susan Fast said that with the group's use of technology in the song's opening, "there can be no mistake that U2 has embraced sound resources new to them".

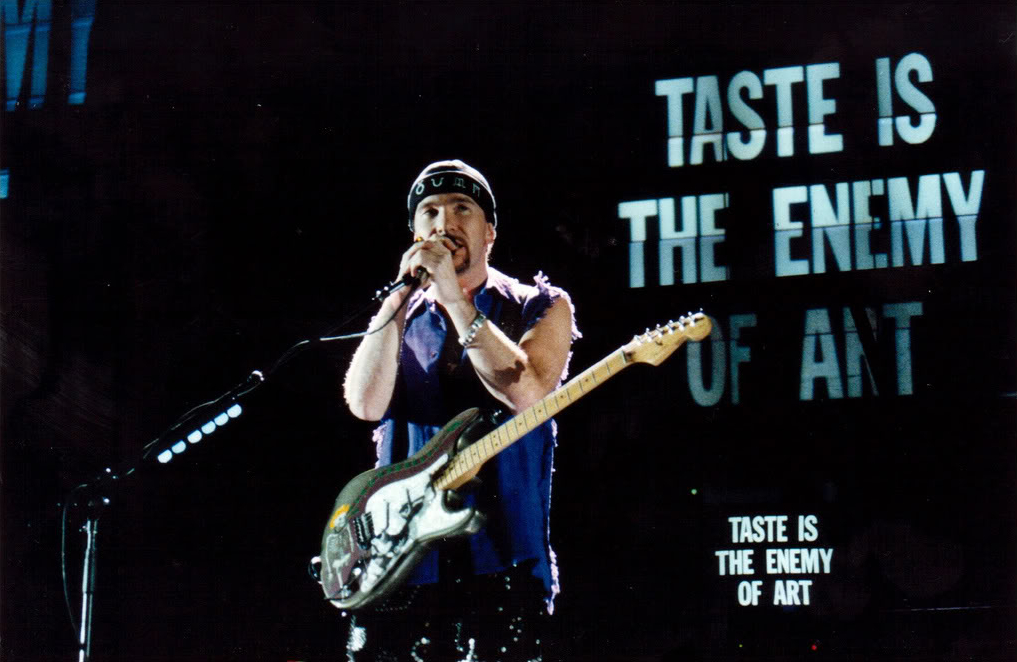
The Edge on the Zoo TV Tour in November 1993

For the album, the Edge often eschewed his normally minimalistic approach to guitar playing and his trademark chiming, delay-heavy sound, in favour of a style that incorporated more solos, dissonance, and feedback. Industrial influences and guitar effects, particularly distortion, contributed to a "metallic" style and "harder textures". Music journalist Bill Wyman said the Edge's guitar playing on the closing track "Love Is Blindness" sounded like a "dentist's drill". The Edge achieved breakthroughs in the writing of songs such as "Even Better Than the Real Thing" and "Mysterious Ways" by toying with various effects units.

The rhythm section is more pronounced in the mix on Achtung Baby, and hip-hop-inspired electronic dance beats are featured on many of the album's tracks, most prominently "The Fly". Elysa Gardner of Rolling Stone compared the layering of dance beats into guitar-heavy mixes to songs by British bands Happy Mondays and Jesus Jones. "Mysterious Ways" combines a funky guitar riff with a danceable, conga-laden beat, for what Bono called "U2 at our funkiest ... Sly and The Family Stone meets Madchester baggy." Amidst layers of distorted guitars, "The Fly" and "Zoo Station" feature industrial-influenced percussion—the timbre of Mullen's drums exhibits a "cold, processed sound, something like beating on a tin can", according to author Albin Zak.

Whereas Bono exhibited a full-throated vocal delivery on the group's previous releases, for Achtung Baby he extended his range into a lower register and used what Fast described as "breathy and subdued colors". On many tracks, including "The Fly" and "Zoo Station", he sang as a character; one technique used is octave doubling, in which the vocals are doubled but sung in two different octaves. This octave differentiation was sometimes done with vocals simultaneously, while at other times, it distinguishes voices between the verses and choruses. According to Fast, the technique introduces "a contrasting lyrical idea and vocal character to deliver it", leading to both literal and ironic interpretations of Bono's vocals. He said that lowering his voice helped him find a new vocal vocabulary, as he previously felt limited to "certain words and tones" by his tenor voice. Other methods of altering his vocals included treating them with processing and feeding them through a distortion pedal. These techniques were all used to give his voice a different emotional feel and distinguish it from his previous work.

=== Lyrics ===
"Zoo Station"
The introduction to "Zoo Station" was meant to make listeners think "This record is broken" or "This can't be the new U2 record".

"One"
"One" was improvised after the Edge played two chord progressions together that he was trying for another song. The lyrics describe a bitter conversation between two people.

"The Fly"
"The Fly" was chosen as the first single because its dance beats, distorted vocals, and hard industrial edge sounded nothing like typical U2.

As is often the case on U2 albums, Bono is credited as the sole lyricist. In contrast to U2's previous records, whose lyrics were politically and socially charged, Achtung Baby is more personal and introspective, examining love, sexuality, spirituality, faith, and betrayal. The lyrics are darker in tone, describing troubled personal relationships and exuding feelings of confusion, loneliness, and inadequacy. Lyrics were inspired by the dissolution of the Edge's marriage, as well as that of another of Bono's friends. During the album's recording, the Edge separated from his wife (the mother of three of his children), and the pain he felt resulted in him dedicating himself to the record and advocating for more personal themes. Bono found inspiration from his own personal life, citing the births of his two daughters in 1989 and 1991 as major influences. This is reflected in "Zoo Station", which opens the album as a statement of intent with lyrics suggesting new anticipations and appetites.

Of the album's personal nature, Bono said that there were a lot of "blood and guts" in it. His lyrics to the ballad "One" were inspired by the band members' interpersonal struggles and the German reunification. The Edge described the song on one level as a "bitter, twisted, vitriolic conversation between two people who've been through some nasty, heavy stuff". Similarly, "Ultraviolet (Light My Way)" describes a strained relationship and unease over obligations, and on "Acrobat", Bono sings about weakness, hypocrisy, and inadequacy. The torch songs of Roy Orbison, Scott Walker, and Jacques Brel were major influences, evidenced by tracks such as: "Who's Gonna Ride Your Wild Horses", a description of a couple's argument; "So Cruel", about unrequited love, obsession, and possessiveness; and the closing track, "Love Is Blindness", a bleak account of a failing romance.

U2 biographer Bill Flanagan credits Bono's habit of keeping his lyrics "in flux until the last minute" with providing a narrative coherence to the album. Flanagan interpreted Achtung Baby as using the moon as a metaphor for a dark woman seducing the singer away from his virtuous love, the sun; he is tempted away from domestic life by an exciting nightlife and tests how far he can go before returning home. For Flanagan, "Tryin' to Throw Your Arms Around the World" on the album's latter third describes the character stumbling home in a drunken state, and the final three songs—"Ultraviolet (Light My Way)", "Acrobat", and "Love Is Blindness"—are about how the couple deal with the suffering they have forced on each other.

Despite the record's darker themes, many lyrics are more flippant and sexual than those from the band's previous work. This reflects the group's revisiting some of the Dadaist characters and stage antics they dabbled with in the late 1970s as teenagers but abandoned for more literal themes in the 1980s. While the band had previously been opposed to materialism, they examined and flirted with this value on the album and the Zoo TV Tour. The title and lyrics of "Even Better Than the Real Thing" are "reflective of the times [the band] were living in, when people were no longer looking for the truth, [they] were all looking for instant gratification". "Trashy" and "throwaway" were among the band's buzzwords during recording, leading to many tracks in this vein. The chorus of "Ultraviolet (Light My Way)" features the pop lyrical cliché "baby, baby, baby", juxtaposed against the dark lyrics in the verses. Bono wrote the lyrics to "The Fly" in character as the song's eponymous persona by composing a sequence of aphorisms. He called the song "like a crank call from Hell ... but [the caller] likes it there".

Religious imagery is present throughout the record. "Until the End of the World" is an imagined conversation between Jesus Christ and his betrayer, Judas Iscariot. On "Acrobat", Bono sings about feelings of spiritual alienation in the line "I'd break bread and wine / If there was a church I could receive in". In many tracks, Bono's lyrics about women carry religious connotations, describing them as spirits, life, light, and idols to be worshipped. Religious interpretations of the album are the subject of the book Meditations on Love in the Shadow of the Fall from the 33 ⅓ series.

== Packaging and title ==
... the very title Achtung Baby strives for lack of significance and—just as insignificantly—the sleeve itself is not the usual single cinematic image of heroic import but rather a grid of snapshots evoking, if a little cleanly, the slapdash glory that was Robert Frank's artwork for the [Rolling] Stones' Exile on Main Street.

— Mat Snow, contrasting the title and artwork of Achtung Baby with U2's previous albums

The sleeve artwork for Achtung Baby was designed by two employees from the design firm Works Associates: Steve Averill, U2's long-time album cover designer; and Shaughn McGrath, who had just joined the firm. To parallel the band's change in musical direction, Averill and McGrath devised sleeve concepts that used multiple colour images to contrast with the seriousness of the individual, mostly monochromatic images from previous U2 album sleeves. Rough sketches and designs were created early during the recording sessions, and some experimental designs were conceived to closely resemble dance music sleeves. Averill said: "We just did them to show how extreme we could go and then everyone came back to levels that they were happy with. But if we hadn't gone to these extremes it may not have been the cover it is now."

An initial photo shoot with the band's long-time photographer Anton Corbijn was conducted near U2's Berlin hotel in late 1990. Most of the photos were black-and-white, and the group felt they were not indicative of the spirit of the new album. They recommissioned Corbijn for an additional two-week photo shoot in Tenerife in February 1991, for which they dressed up and mingled with the crowds of the annual Carnival of Santa Cruz de Tenerife, presenting a more playful side of themselves. It was during the group's time in Tenerife and during a four-day shoot in Morocco in July that they were photographed in drag. Additional photos were taken in a Dublin studio in June, a session in which Corbijn captured long exposures over several minutes. One of the photos from this session depicted a naked Clayton. Overall, Corbijn's images for Achtung Baby were intended to confound expectations of U2, and their full colour contrasted with the monochromatic imagery on past sleeves.

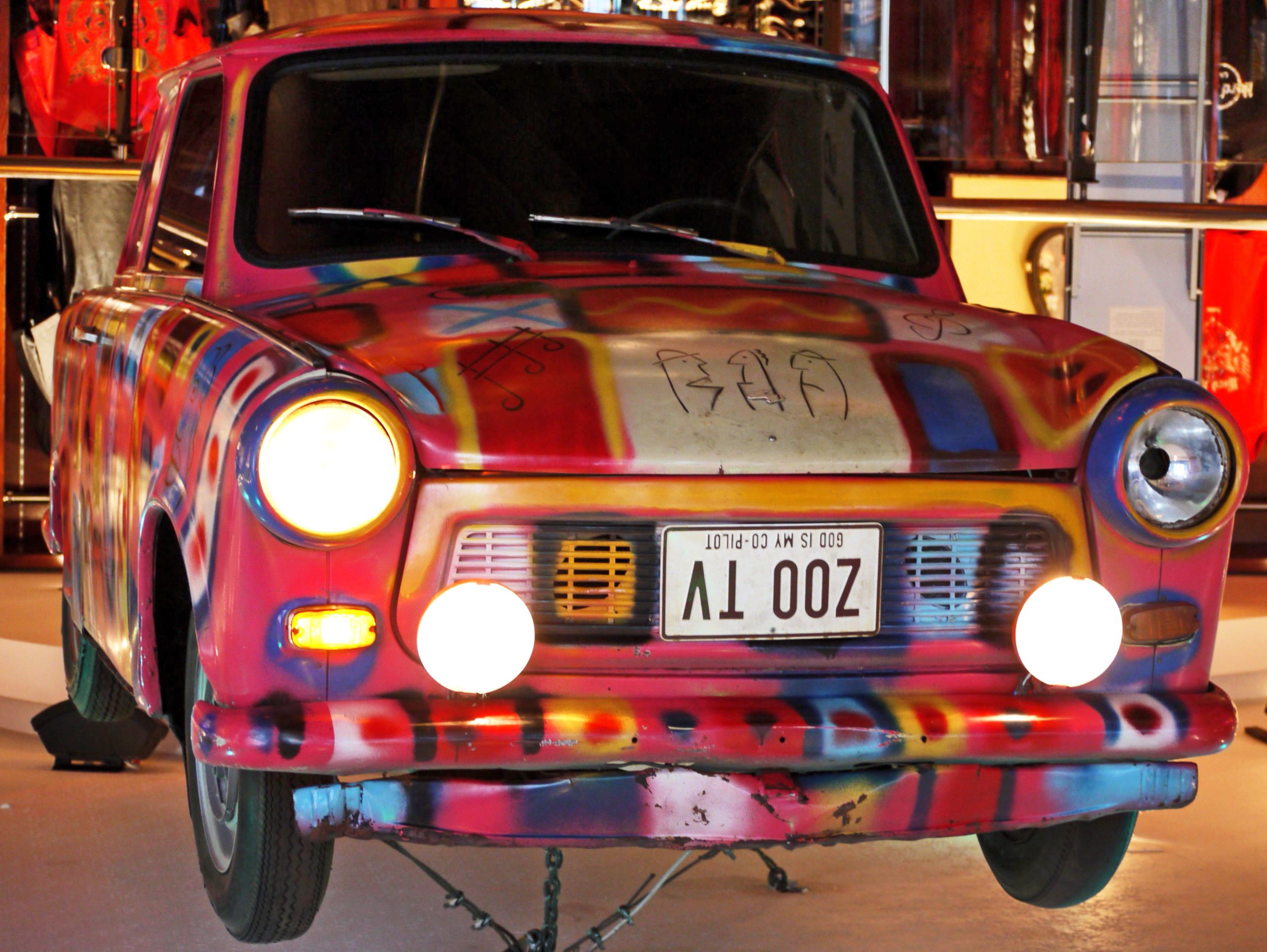
A Trabant from the Zoo TV Tour, displayed at the Dublin Hard Rock Cafe. The group were photographed with several elaborately painted Trabants for the album sleeve.

For the photoshoots in Berlin and Tenerife, the band were photographed with brightly painted Trabants, East German automobiles that became a symbol of the fall of Communism and for which the band had developed an affection. Street artist Thierry Noir was commissioned to provide the artwork and painted the vehicles in Hansa Studios' parking lot; he became involved through a fellow collaborator of the band's, film director Wim Wenders. Images of the band with the Trabants appear on the sleeve and throughout the album booklet. These vehicles were later incorporated into the Zoo TV Tour set design as part of the lighting system.

Several photographs were considered as candidates for a single cover image, including shots of: a cow on an Irish farm in County Kildare; the nude Clayton; and the band driving a Trabant. Ultimately, a multiple image scheme was used, as U2, Corbijn, Averill, and the producers thought that "the sense of flux expressed by both the music and the band's playing with alter egos was best articulated by the lack of a single viewpoint". The resulting front sleeve is arranged as a 4×4 square grid. A mix of Corbijn's original images from Berlin and the later photo shoots was used, as the band wanted to balance the "colder European feel of the mainly black-and-white Berlin images with the much warmer exotic climates of Santa Cruz and Morocco". Some photographs were used because they were striking on their own, while others were used because of their ambiguity. The nude photo of Clayton was placed on the rear cover of the record. After objections to the photo were raised in the United States, it was censored; Averill and McGrath painted a black "X" and faxed it to the record label, which turned it into a sticker that American distributors and retailers could affix to the album packaging to cover Clayton's genitals. Compact disc and cassette copies were censored with the sticker, while vinyl editions featured the photo uncensored.

To "match the gush of spontaneity and power of the photography", McGrath calligraphed the album title, band name, and track listing for the packaging, using paintbrushes as well as ink and pen. Contrasting with the "unique humanity" of his handwriting, McGrath set the lyrics and album credits in the ubiquitous European font Helvetica, "mirror[ing] the repetitive industrial and Germanic themes of the album". The label of the physical CD and vinyl disc features an image of a "babyface" graffitied by artist Charlie Whisker onto an external wall of Windmill Lane Studios and photographed by Richie Smyth. The babyface image was later adopted as a logo for Zoo TV Tour memorabilia and was incorporated into the Zooropa album cover. In 2003, music television network VH1 ranked Achtung Baby's sleeve at number 39 on its list of the "50 Greatest Album Covers". Bono has called the sleeve his favourite U2 cover artwork.

The German word Achtung (German: [ˈaxtʊŋ]) in the album title is an interjection that translates into English as "attention" or "watch out". There are multiple reports of the origins of the album's title. According to singer Tottie Goldsmith, she often used the phrase "Achtung, baby" to get her boyfriend's attention and was once overheard by Bono at a party in 1989, who "turned around to ask her why she had just said that". Goldsmith has said that inspiring the album title became her "claim to fame". According to Bono, U2's sound engineer Joe O'Herlihy said the phrase "Achtung, baby" often during the recording sessions, using it as a "call to arms" each time the band were about to begin work for the day. He reportedly took it from Mel Brooks's 1967 film The Producers; however, the phrase is not spoken in the film and actually originated from Brooks's 1983 comedy hip-hop song "To Be or Not to Be (The Hitler Rap)". The album title was selected in August 1991 near the end of the album sessions. Bono thought it was an ideal title, as it was attention-grabbing to him, referenced Germany, and hinted at either romance or birth, both of which were themes on the album. The band were determined not to highlight the seriousness of the lyrics and instead sought to "erect a mask" with the title, a concept that was further developed on the Zoo TV Tour, particularly through Bono's characters such as "The Fly". Of the title, he said in 1992: "It's a con, in a way. We call it Achtung Baby, grinning up our sleeves in all the photography. But it's probably the heaviest record we've ever made ... It tells you a lot about packaging, because the press would have killed us if we'd called it anything else."

U2 considered several other titles for the album, including Man (in contrast to the group's debut, Boy), 69, Zoo Station, and Adam, the latter of which would have been paired with the nude photo of Clayton. Other titles in consideration included Fear of Women and Cruise Down Main Street, the latter a reference to the Rolling Stones' record Exile on Main St. and the cruise missiles launched on Baghdad during the Gulf War. Most of the proposed titles were rejected out of the belief that people would see them as pretentious and "another Big Statement from U2".

== Release and promotion ==
As early as December 1990, the music press reported that U2 would be recording a dance-oriented album and that it would be released in mid-1991. In August 1991, sound collage artists Negativland released an EP entitled U2 that parodied U2's song "I Still Haven't Found What I'm Looking For". Island Records objected to the release, believing consumers would confuse the EP for a new U2 record. Island successfully sued for copyright infringement but were criticised in the music press, as were U2, although the band were not involved in the litigation.

Uncut's Stephen Dalton believed that the negative headlines were tempered by the success of Achtung Baby's first single, "The Fly", released on 21 October 1991 a month before the album. Sounding nothing like U2's typical style, it was selected as the lead single to announce the group's new musical direction, but the song's sound presented a challenge to Island executive Marc Marot. "The Fly" was the first U2 single for which he had responsibility for worldwide marketing, and according to him, it had one of the lowest airplay rotations on BBC Radio 1 of any song that year; Marot said it was "probably the only [U2 single] nobody can sing the chorus of". Consequently, the label devised a plan to help it reach number one on the UK Singles Chart by manufacturing an unlimited number of copies for retailers but for one week only. "The Fly" subsequently became the band's second song to reach number one in the UK, and it also topped the singles charts in Ireland and Australia. The single was less successful in the US, peaking at number 61 on the Billboard Hot 100.

Island Records and U2 refused to make advance copies of the album available to the press until just a few days before the release date, preferring that fans listen to the record before reading reviews. The decision came amid rumours of tensions within the band, and journalist David Browne compared it to the Hollywood practice of withholding pre-release copies of films from reviewers whenever they receive poor word-of-mouth press. Achtung Baby was released on 18 November 1991 in the UK and 19 November in the US on compact disc, cassette tape, and vinyl record, with an initial shipment of more than 1.4 million copies in the US. The album was the first release by a major act to use two so-called "eco-friendly" packages—the cardboard Digipak, and the shrinkwrapped jewel case without the longbox cardboard attachment. Island encouraged record stores to order the jewel case packaging by offering a four-percent discount.

Achtung Baby was U2's first album in three years and their first comprising entirely new material in over four years. The group maintained a low profile after the record's release, avoiding interviews and allowing critics and the public to make their own assessments. Instead of participating in an article with Rolling Stone magazine, U2 asked Eno to write one for them. The marketing plan for the album focused on retail and press promotions. In addition to television and radio advertisements being produced, posters featuring the sleeve's 16 images were distributed to record stores and through alternative newspapers in major cities. Compared to the large hype of other 1991 year-end releases, the marketing for Achtung Baby was relatively understated, as Island general manager Andy Allen explained: "U2 will not come out with that kind of fanfare in terms of outside media. We feel the fan base itself creates that kind of excitement."

"Mysterious Ways" was released as the second single five days after the release of Achtung Baby. On the US Billboard charts, the song topped the Modern Rock Tracks and Album Rock Tracks charts, and it reached number nine on the Hot 100. Elsewhere, it reached number one in Canada and number three in Australia. Three additional commercial singles were released in 1992. "One", released in March at the beginning of the Zoo TV Tour, reached number seven in the UK and number ten in the US charts. Like its predecessor, it topped the Modern Rock Tracks chart, and the singles charts in Canada and Ireland. The song has since become regarded as one of the greatest of all time, ranking highly on many critics' lists. The fourth single from Achtung Baby, "Even Better Than the Real Thing", was released in June. The album version of the song peaked at number 12 on the UK Singles Chart, while reaching number one on the US Album Rock Tracks chart. A "Perfecto" remix of the song by DJ Paul Oakenfold performed better in the UK than the album version did, peaking at number eight. "Who's Gonna Ride Your Wild Horses" followed as the fifth and final single in November 1992. It peaked at number 14 on the UK Singles Chart, and number two on the US Album Rock Tracks chart. All five commercial singles charted within the top 20 in Ireland, Australia, Canada, and the UK. Promotional singles for "Until the End of the World", "Salomé", and "Zoo Station" were also released.

In October 1992, U2 released Achtung Baby: The Videos, the Cameos, and a Whole Lot of Interference from Zoo TV, a VHS and LaserDisc compilation of nine music videos from the album. Running for 65 minutes, it was produced by Ned O'Hanlon and released by Island and PolyGram. It included three music videos each for "One" and "Even Better than the Real Thing", along with videos for "The Fly", "Mysterious Ways", and "Until the End of the World". Interspersed between the music videos were clips of so-called "interference", comprising documentary footage, media clips, and other video similar to what was displayed at Zoo TV Tour concerts. The release was certified platinum in the US, and gold in Canada.

Achtung Baby: The Videos, the Cameos, and a Whole Lot of Interference from Zoo TV track listing
No.	Title	Director	Length
1.	"Interference"	Maurice Linnane	(Note: The three "interference" segments combined for a total running length of 25:46, according to the video release notes.)
2.	"Even Better Than the Real Thing"	Kevin Godley	3:41
3.	"Interference"	Linnane
4.	"Mysterious Ways"	Stéphane Sednaoui	4:02
5.	"One" (version 1)	Anton Corbijn	4:34
6.	"The Fly"	Ritchie Smyth, Jon Klein	4:52
7.	"Interference"	Linnane
8.	"Even Better Than the Real Thing" (dance mix)	Smyth	4:35
9.	"One" (version 2)	Mark Pellington	4:34
10.	"Even Better Than the Real Thing"	Armando Gallo, Kampah	3:45
11.	"One" (version 3)	Phil Joanou	4:34
12.	"Until the End of the World"	Smyth	4:38
Total length:			65:01

== Reception ==
=== Critical reaction ===
1991–92 reviews
Review scores
Source	Rating
Calgary Herald	B+
Chicago Tribune	3/4 stars
Entertainment Weekly	A
Hot Press	10/12
Los Angeles Times	4/4 stars
The New Zealand Herald	3.5/5 stars
Orlando Sentinel	4/5 stars
Q	5/5 stars
Rolling Stone	4.5/5 stars
Spin	(Note: According to Spin magazine's rating key at the time, a yellow circle was the second on a scale of three colored circles and indicated an album that is "pretty good" but relatively inessential.)

Achtung Baby received acclaim from music critics. Elysa Gardner of Rolling Stone said U2 had "proven that the same penchant for epic musical and verbal gestures that leads many artists to self-parody can, in more inspired hands, fuel the unforgettable fire that defines great rock & roll." The review said that the album, like its predecessor Rattle and Hum, was an attempt by the band to "broaden its musical palette, but this time its ambitions are realized". Bill Wyman from Entertainment Weekly called it a "pristinely produced and surprisingly unpretentious return by one of the most impressive bands in the world". Steve Morse of The Boston Globe echoed these sentiments, stating that the album "not only reinvigorates their sound, but drops any self-righteousness. The songs focus on personal relationships, not on saving the world." Morse commended the album's "clanging, knob-twisting sound effects" and the Edge's "metallic, head-snapping guitar". In the Los Angeles Times, Robert Hilburn stated, "the arty, guitar-driven textures are among the band's most confident and vigorous ever". He said the album would be a difficult one for listeners because of the dark, introspective nature of the songs, which contrasts with the group's uplifting songs of the past. Parry Gettelmen of the Orlando Sentinel said that Achtung Baby "shows U2 still has the power to surprise", highlighting the warmth of Bono's vocals, the imagery of his lyrics, and the producers for helping the Edge "achieve a spacious sound without getting anthemic". He commended the band's musical transformation, saying, "U2 proves much more adept at the dance-trance thing than the Happy Roses or Stone Carpets or other indistinguishable haircut bands". Jon Pareles of The New York Times lauded the record not only for featuring "noisy, vertiginous arrangements", but also for the group's ability to "maintain its pop skills". The review concluded, "Stripped-down and defying its old formulas, U2 has given itself a fighting chance for the 1990s."

Q's Mat Snow called Achtung Baby U2's "heaviest album to date. And best." Snow praised the band and its production team for making "music of drama, depth, intensity and, believe it, funkiness". Adam Sweeting of The Guardian said that with the album, U2 "evolved a raw, semi-industrial noise though [sic] which to filter strong melodies and thrusting funk-rock grooves". He praised the group for improving their songwriting and incorporating "black humour" into darker lyrical themes. He said the album was "quite an achievement" at following up a successful record, responding to emerging musical influences, and expanding the band's sound while still pleasing existing fans. Greg Kot of the Chicago Tribune felt the record "shows the band in a grittier light: disrupting, rather than fulfilling, expectations". He praised Lanois' production and said that due to the Edge's guitar playing, "U2 sounds punkier than it has since its 1980 debut, Boy". Kot concluded his review by calling the album "a magnificent search for transcendence made all the more moving for its flaws". Niall Stokes of Hot Press found Achtung Baby to be paradoxical, calling it U2's bleakest record while containing "their most obvious singles", and saying, "It sounds less like the U2 that we know than anything they have done before and yet it is unmistakably them". He wrote, "Ostensibly decadent, sensual and dark, it is a record of, and for, these times." The New Zealand Herald found it "pretty damn good" and described its sound as "subdued, tightly controlled, [and] introverted". However, it said that too many "downbeat moments where songs seem to be going nowhere" prevented it from being a "truly wondrous affair". In Spin, Jim Greer was more critical of the album, calling it an "ambitious failure"; the review welcomed its experimentation but judged that when the group "strays from familiar territory, the results are hit-and-miss". The Village Voice critic Robert Christgau rated it a dud, indicating a bad album unworthy of a review. Two years later, he reflected on the rating: "After many, many tries, Achtung Baby still sounded like a damnably diffuse U2 album to me, and I put it in the hall unable to describe a single song ... although I admittedly enjoy a few of its anthems-in-disguise now."

=== Awards and accolades ===
The success of Achtung Baby and the Zoo TV Tour re-established U2 as one of the most popular and critically acclaimed musical acts in the world. The group nearly swept Rolling Stone's 1992 end-of-year readers' polls, winning honours for "Best Single" ("One"), "Artist of the Year", "Best Album", "Best Songwriter" (Bono), "Best Album Cover", and "Comeback of the Year", among others. Critics at several newspapers, such as The Washington Post, The Boston Globe, and the Chicago Sun-Times, ranked the album among the year's best. The album placed fourth on the "Best Albums" list from The Village Voice's 1991 Pazz & Jop critics' poll. It was shortlisted for the 1992 Mercury Music Prize. At the 35th Annual Grammy Awards, Achtung Baby won the award for Best Rock Performance by a Duo or Group with Vocal and was nominated for Album of the Year, and it earned Lanois and Eno the award for Producer of the Year (Non-Classical). At the American Music Awards of 1993, Achtung Baby was nominated for Favorite Pop/Rock Album, and at the Juno Awards of 1993, it was nominated for Best Selling Album (Foreign or Domestic). In 2024, Achtung Baby was selected as the winner of the RTÉ Choice Music Prize for Classic Irish Album.

== Commercial performance ==
Achtung Baby performed well commercially; in the US, it debuted at number one on the Billboard 200 Top Albums on 7 December 1991, having sold 295,000 copies in its first week. The album fell to number three the following week, but spent its first 13 weeks on the chart within the top ten. In total, it spent 101 weeks on the Billboard 200 Top Albums. On 21 January 1992, the Recording Industry Association of America (RIAA) certified it double-platinum. Achtung Baby peaked at number two on the UK Albums Chart and spent 93 weeks on the chart, five of which were in the top ten. In other regions, it topped the RPM 100 in Canada, the ARIA Albums Chart in Australia, and the RIANZ Top 40 Albums in New Zealand. The record sold 7 million copies worldwide in its first three months on sale, and by the end of 1992, it had sold 10 million copies.

According to Nielsen Soundscan, Achtung Baby had sold 4.9 million copies in the US by February 1997 and 5.5 million copies by March 2009. It has been certified 8× platinum in the US by the RIAA. The record has been certified 5× platinum in Australia, 4× platinum in the UK, and diamond in Canada, the highest certification award. Overall, 18 million copies have been sold worldwide. It is U2's second-highest-selling record after The Joshua Tree, which has sold 25 million copies.

== Zoo TV Tour ==
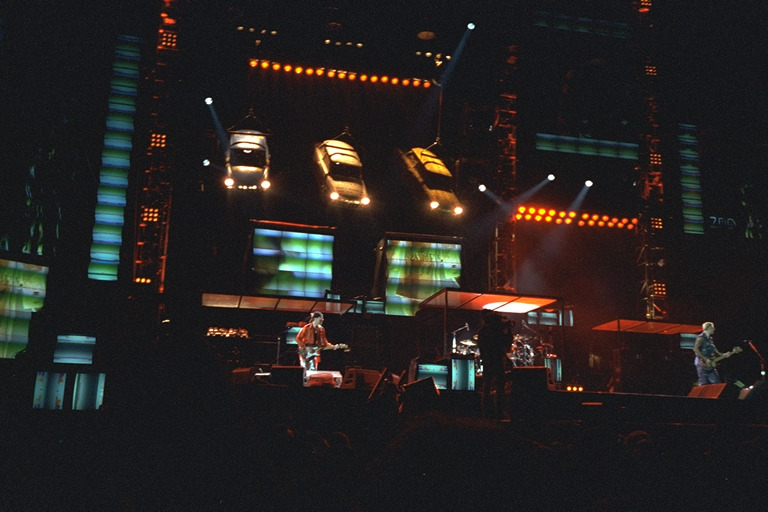
The Zoo TV Tour was a multimedia-intensive event, featuring a stage that used dozens of video screens.

Following the release of Achtung Baby, U2 staged a worldwide concert tour, the Zoo TV Tour. Like Achtung Baby, the tour was intended to deviate from the band's past. In contrast to the austere stage setups of previous U2 tours, Zoo TV was an elaborately staged multimedia event. It satirised television and the viewing public's overstimulation by attempting to instill "sensory overload" in its audience. The stage featured large video screens that showed visual effects, random video clips from pop culture, and flashing text phrases. The shows incorporated channel surfing, prank calls, video confessionals, a belly dancer, and live satellite transmissions with war-torn Sarajevo.

Whereas the group were known for their earnest live act in the 1980s, their Zoo TV performances were intentionally ironic and self-deprecating; on stage, Bono portrayed several characters he conceived, including "The Fly", "Mirror Ball Man", and "MacPhisto". The majority of the album's songs were played at each show, and the set lists began with up to eight consecutive Achtung Baby songs as a further sign that they were no longer the U2 of the 1980s.

The tour began in February 1992 and comprised 157 shows over almost two years. During a six-month break, the band recorded the album Zooropa, which was released in July 1993. It was inspired by Zoo TV and expanded on its themes of technology and media oversaturation. By the time the tour concluded in December 1993, it had sold about 5.3 million tickets and reportedly grossed US$151 million. In 2002, Q magazine said the Zoo TV Tour was "still the most spectacular rock tour staged by any band". The tour's 27 November 1993 concert in Sydney was filmed and commercially released as Zoo TV: Live from Sydney by PolyGram in May 1994.

== Legacy ==
Retrospective professional ratings
Aggregate scores
Source	Rating
Metacritic	93/100 (2011)
Review scores
Source	Rating
AllMusic	5/5 stars
The A.V. Club	A
Blender	5/5 stars
Entertainment Weekly	A
Mojo	5/5 stars
Pitchfork	9.5/10
Q	5/5 stars
Record Collector	4/5 stars
The Rolling Stone Album Guide	5/5 stars
Uncut	4/5 stars

For U2, Achtung Baby was a watershed that secured their creative future, and its success led to their continued musical experimentation during the 1990s. Zooropa, released in 1993, was a further departure, incorporating additional dance music influences and electronic effects into their sound. In 1995, U2 and Eno collaborated on the experimental/ambient album Original Soundtracks 1 under the pseudonym "Passengers". For Pop in 1997, the group's experiences with dance club culture and their usage of tape loops, programming, rhythm sequencing, and sampling resulted in their most dance-oriented album.

Achtung Baby is highly regarded among the members of U2. Mullen said: "I thought it was a great record. I was very proud of it. Its success was by no means preordained. It was a real break from what we had done before and we didn't know if our fans would like it or not." Bono called the album a "pivot point" in the band's career, saying, "Making Achtung Baby is the reason we're still here now." Clayton concurred, saying: "If we hadn't done something we were excited about, that made us apprehensive and challenged everything we stood for, then there would really have been no reason to carry on ... If it hadn't been a great record by our standards, the existence of the band would have been threatened." The group's reinvention occurred at the peak of the alternative rock movement, when the genre was achieving widespread mainstream popularity. Bill Flanagan pointed out that many of U2's 1980s contemporaries struggled commercially with albums released after the turn of the decade. He argued that U2, however, were able to take advantage of the alternative rock movement and ensure a successful future by "set[ting] themselves up as the first of the new groups rather than the last of the old". Toby Creswell echoed these sentiments in his 2006 music reference book 1001 Songs, writing that the album helped U2 avoid "becoming parodies of themselves and being swept aside by the grunge and techno revolutions". In a retrospective review for AllMusic, Stephen Thomas Erlewine called the band's musical transformation "thorough", "effective", and "endlessly inventive". He concluded that few artists at that stage in their career could have "recorded an album as adventurous or fulfilled their ambitions quite as successfully as U2 [did]". A 2010 retrospective by Spin said that "U2 became the emblematic band of the alternative-rock era with Achtung Baby."

The album accomplished a feat artists love to undertake but rarely pull off: the public image reinvention and stylistic about-face that is so masterful it silences all the doubters. Even as the 21st century has seen U2 return to stadium-friendly rock postures, there are elements in the group's music (Bono's falsetto, the casual flirtation with danceable grooves, the quartet's continued ability to take itself less than seriously when necessary) that are still derived from those heady days in a Berlin studio. The biggest band in the world wouldn't hold that title today if it hadn't taken one hell of a chance at the exact right time with a record that proved more than strong enough to warrant that gamble.

— AJ Ramirez of PopMatters, in 2011

Achtung Baby has been acclaimed by writers and music critics as one of the greatest albums of all time. In 1997, The Guardian collated worldwide data from a range of renowned critics, artists, and radio DJs, who placed the record at number 71 on a list of the "100 Best Albums Ever". The record was ranked 36th in Colin Larkin's 2000 book All Time Top 1000 Albums. In 2003, the National Association of Recording Merchandisers ranked it at number 45 on its "Definitive 200" list, while USA Today featured it on their list of the top 40 albums of all time. Rolling Stone placed the record at number 62 on its 2003 list of "The 500 Greatest Albums of All Time". Subsequent updates to the list re-ranked the album: the 2012 version ranked it 63rd, calling it "a prescient mix of sleek rock and pulsing Euro grooves" while saying "the emotional turmoil made U2 sound more human than ever"; the 2020 version of the list ranked it 124th. In 2006, the album appeared on a number of all-time lists, including Hot Press's "100 Greatest Albums Ever" at number 21, Time's list of "The All-Time 100 Albums", and the book 1001 Albums You Must Hear Before You Die. VH1 ranked it 65th on the "100 Greatest Albums of Rock & Roll" episode of its television series The Greatest. Entertainment Weekly's 2013 list of the "All-Time Greatest" albums ranked the record 23rd, saying that instead of "coast[ing] forever on the cinematic storytelling they mastered on the excellently righteous The Joshua Tree", the group "ripped up the rule book" with Achtung Baby. The record topped Spin's list of the 125 most influential albums from 1985 to 2010; writer Charles Aaron said: "Unlike Radiohead with OK Computer and Kid A, U2 took their post-industrial, trad-rock disillusionment not as a symbol of overall cultural malaise, but as a challenge to buck up and transcend ... Struggling to simultaneously embrace and blow up the world, they were never more inspirational."

== Reissues and commemorations ==
=== 20th anniversary releases ===
The 20th anniversary of Achtung Baby was marked by several releases in 2011. At the band's request, a documentary film about the album entitled From the Sky Down was produced. It was directed by Davis Guggenheim, who previously collaborated with the Edge for the documentary It Might Get Loud in 2008. From the Sky Down documents the album's difficult recording period, the band members' relationships, and U2's creative process. Archival footage and stills from the recording sessions appear in the film, along with unreleased scenes from Rattle and Hum. For the documentary, the band were filmed during a return visit to Hansa Studios and during rehearsals for the Glastonbury Festival 2011. The film premiered at the 2011 Toronto International Film Festival, becoming the first documentary to open the festival, and in October, it was broadcast on multiple television networks worldwide.

On 31 October 2011, Achtung Baby was reissued in five formats. In addition to a single-disc release of the album, a deluxe edition included a bonus disc of remixes and B-sides from the album's five singles, and a vinyl edition included the album on two LPs with two additional LPs of remixes. The 10-disc "Super Deluxe" and "Über Deluxe" editions included: the Zooropa album; three additional CDs with remixes, B-sides, and outtakes; a disc with nascent versions of Achtung Baby's 12 songs called Kindergarten; four DVDs containing From the Sky Down, the Zoo TV: Live from Sydney concert film, music videos, and other bonus material; 16 art prints; and a hardback book. The "Über Deluxe" edition also contains a double-vinyl copy of the album, five 7-inch vinyl singles, a copy of U2's fan club magazine Propaganda, and a replica of Bono's "Fly" sunglasses. The media initially reported that the reissue was a remastered release. However, the reissue's official website initially excluded any mention of "remastering" before adding it and then removing it. The Edge confirmed that the album was not fully remastered since "the original was so right" and so much "artistry had gone into the original EQ'ing" but did say that they were able to "optimize it ... tweak the levels, give it a bit of a polish". "Blow Your House Down", an outtake included in the deluxe editions, was released as a promotional single in October 2011.

Q commissioned an Achtung Baby tribute album, entitled AHK-toong BAY-bi Covered, that was included in the magazine's December 2011 issue. It features performances by Jack White, Depeche Mode, Damien Rice, Gavin Friday, Glasvegas, The Fray, Patti Smith, The Killers, Snow Patrol, Nine Inch Nails, and Garbage.

=== Subsequent reissues and releases ===
Continuing a campaign by U2 to reissue all of their records on vinyl, Achtung Baby was re-released on two 180-gram vinyl records on 27 July 2018. Unlike the 2011 reissue, the album was remastered for its 2018 reissue, with direction from the Edge. Each copy includes a download card that can be used to redeem a digital copy of the album.

In 2021, Achtung Baby was re-released in several formats for its 30th anniversary: standard black vinyl and deluxe colour vinyl editions were released on 19 November, followed by a 50-track digital box set on 3 December. The band also collaborated with Thierry Noir on an art installation held at Hansa Studios; Noir, who painted the original Trabants featured in the album photography, contributed new artwork to a Trabant and a section of the Berlin Wall for the exhibition. The bonnet of the car was auctioned to benefit the Berlin Institute for Sound and Music.

In January 2024, a Dolby Atmos surround sound mix of Achtung Baby was digitally released to streaming platforms. It was the first album from U2's catalogue to be released in the format. Mixing was done in five studios globally over a 17-month period.

=== Concert residency at Sphere ===
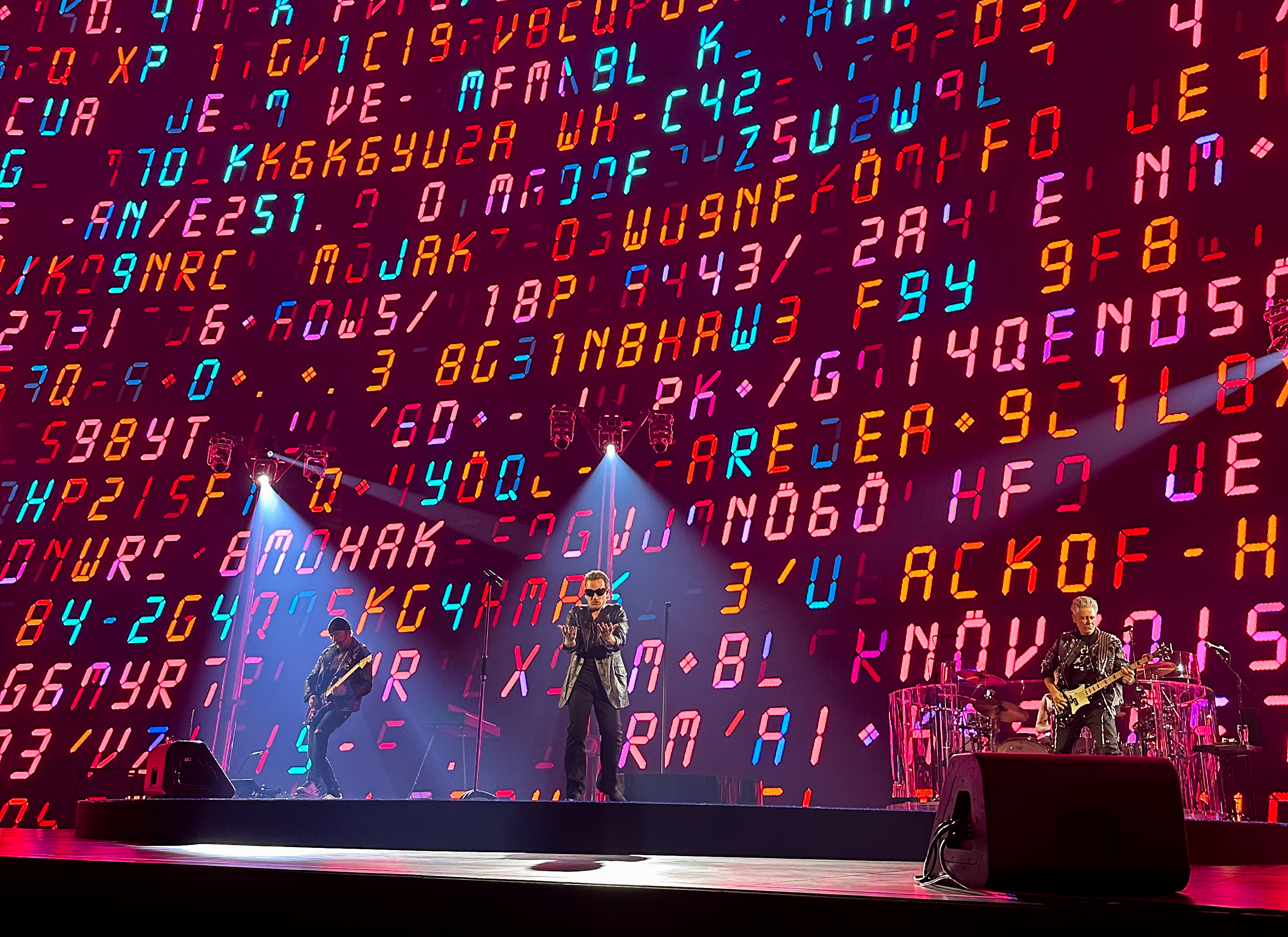
U2 on opening night of their 2023–2024 residency at Sphere. Each concert featured a full performance of Achtung Baby.

From September 2023 to March 2024, U2 staged a 40-date concert residency called U2:UV Achtung Baby Live to inaugurate the concert venue Sphere in the Las Vegas Valley. The shows featured a full performance of Achtung Baby and leveraged the venue's immersive video and sound capabilities. Mullen did not participate in the concerts in order to recuperate from surgery, marking the first time since 1978 that U2 performed without him; Dutch drummer Bram van den Berg from the band Krezip filled in. The residency grossed $244.5 million from 663,000 tickets sold, making it the fourth-highest-grossing concert residency of all time.

== Track listing ==
All lyrics are written by Bono; all music is composed by U2.

Achtung Baby track listing
No.	Title	Producer	Length
1.	"Zoo Station"	Daniel Lanois	4:36
2.	"Even Better Than the Real Thing"	Steve Lillywhite, with Brian Eno and Lanois	3:41
3.	"One"	Lanois with Eno	4:36
4.	"Until the End of the World"	Lanois with Eno	4:39
5.	"Who's Gonna Ride Your Wild Horses"	Lillywhite, Lanois, and Eno	5:16
6.	"So Cruel"	Lanois	5:49
7.	"The Fly"	Lanois	4:29
8.	"Mysterious Ways"	Lanois with Eno	4:04
9.	"Tryin' to Throw Your Arms Around the World"	Lanois with Eno	3:53
10.	"Ultraviolet (Light My Way)"	Lanois with Eno	5:31
11.	"Acrobat"	Lanois	4:30
12.	"Love Is Blindness"	Lanois	4:23
Total length:			55:27

== Personnel ==
Personnel taken from Achtung Baby CD booklet.

U2

- Bono – lead vocals, guitar
- The Edge – guitar, keyboards, vocals
- Adam Clayton – bass guitar
- Larry Mullen Jr. – drums, percussion

Additional performers

- Brian Eno – additional keyboards (tracks 3, 9, 12)
- Daniel Lanois – additional guitar (tracks 1, 3, 9), additional percussion (tracks 4, 8)
- Duchess Nell Catchpole – violin and viola (track 6)

Technical

- Daniel Lanois – production (all tracks), mixing (tracks 4, 7, 8, 11, 12)
- Brian Eno – production (tracks 2–5, 8–12), mixing (track 6), string arrangement (track 6)
- Steve Lillywhite – production (tracks 2, 5), mixing (tracks 2, 5, 7, 9)
- Flood – engineering (tracks 1, 3, 4, 6–10), mixing (tracks 1, 3, 4, 6–8, 10–12)
- Robbie Adams – engineering (tracks 2, 5), mixing (tracks 2, 5, 9), additional engineering (tracks 3, 4, 6–11), engineering assistance (tracks 1, 12), mixing assistance (track 7)
- Paul Barrett – engineering (track 2)
- The Edge – mixing (track 8), string arrangement (track 6)
- Shannon Strong – engineering assistance (all tracks except 2), mixing assistance (tracks 1, 3, 4, 6, 8, 10–12)
- Sean Leonard – mixing assistance (tracks 2, 5, 9)
- Arnie Acosta – mastering
- Stewart Whitmore – digital editing
- Cheryl Engels – quality control

== Charts ==
Weekly album charts performance
Chart (1991–1992)	Peak position
Australian Albums (ARIA)	1
Austrian Albums (Ö3 Austria)	2
Canada Top Albums/CDs (RPM)	1
Dutch Albums (Album Top 100)	2
German Albums (Offizielle Top 100)	4
Hungarian Albums (MAHASZ)	21
Japanese Albums (Oricon)	4
New Zealand Albums (RMNZ)	1
Norwegian Albums (VG-lista)	4
Spanish Albums (AFYVE)	6
Swedish Albums (Sverigetopplistan)	3
Swiss Albums (Schweizer Hitparade)	3
UK Albums (Official Charts)	2
US Billboard 200	1

Chart (1997)	Peak position
Belgian Albums (Ultratop Flanders)	31
Belgian Albums (Ultratop Wallonia)	48
French Albums (SNEP)	37

Chart (2000)	Peak position
Irish Albums (IRMA)	9

Chart (2005)	Peak position
Italian Albums (FIMI)	35
Spanish Albums (Promusicae)	65

Weekly album charts performance for 20th anniversary reissue
Chart (2011)	Peak position
Belgian Albums (Ultratop Wallonia)	20
Mexican Albums (Top 100 Mexico)	38
Portuguese Albums (AFP)	4
South Korean Albums (Circle)	70
South Korean International Albums (Circle)	17
Spanish Albums (Promusicae)	10
US Top Catalog Albums (Billboard)	2
US Top Rock Albums (Billboard)	28

Chart (2018)	Peak position
US Indie Store Album Sales (Billboard)	15
US Vinyl Albums (Billboard)	2

Annual album charts performance
Chart (1991)	Position
Australian Albums (ARIA)	29
Canadian Albums (RPM)	43
Dutch Albums (Album Top 100)	90
New Zealand Albums (RMNZ)	46

Chart (1992)	Position
Argentina Foreign Albums (CAPIF)	18
Austrian Albums (Ö3 Austria)	23
Canadian Albums (RPM)	5
Dutch Albums (Album Top 100)	37
Eurochart Top 100 Albums (Music & Media)	8
German Albums (Offizielle Top 100)	18
New Zealand Albums (RMNZ)	14
Swiss Albums (Schweizer Hitparade)	31
UK Albums (OCC)	31
US Billboard 200	5

Chart (1993)	Position
UK Albums (OCC)	89
US Billboard 200	82

Decade album charts performance
Chart (1990–1999)	Position
US Billboard 200	74

Song charts performance
Year	Title	Chart peak positions				
Year	Title	IRE	AUS	CAN	UK	US
1991	"The Fly"	1	1	16	1	61
1991	"Mysterious Ways"	1	3	1	13	9
1992	"Mysterious Ways"	1	3	1	13	9
1992	"One"	1	4	1	7	10
1992	"Even Better Than the Real Thing"	3	11	3	12	32
1992	"Who's Gonna Ride Your Wild Horses"	4	9	5	14	35
1992	"Until the End of the World"	–	–	69	–	–
"–" denotes a release that did not chart.

== Certifications ==
Sales certifications
Region	Certification	Certified units/sales
Argentina (CAPIF)	Platinum	60,000^{^}
Australia (ARIA)	5× Platinum	350,000^{^}
Austria (IFPI Austria)	Platinum	50,000^{*}
Brazil (Pro-Música Brasil)	Gold	180,000
Canada (Music Canada)	Diamond	1,000,000^{^}
Denmark (IFPI Danmark)	2× Platinum	40,000^{‡}
France (SNEP)	2× Platinum	600,000^{*}
Germany (BVMI)	Platinum	500,000^{^}
Italy (FIMI) sales since 2009	Gold	25,000^{*}
Japan (RIAJ)	Gold	100,000^{^}
Netherlands (NVPI)	Platinum	100,000^{^}
New Zealand (RMNZ)	5× Platinum	75,000^{^}
Norway (IFPI Norway)	Platinum	50,000^{*}
Spain (Promusicae)	Platinum	100,000^{^}
Sweden (GLF)	Platinum	100,000^{^}
Switzerland (IFPI Switzerland)	Gold	25,000^{^}
United Kingdom (BPI)	4× Platinum	1,200,000^{^}
United States (RIAA) album	8× Platinum	8,000,000^{^}
United States (RIAA) video	Platinum	100,000^{^}
^{*} Sales figures based on certification alone.^{^} Shipments figures based on certification alone.^{‡} Sales+streaming figures based on certification alone.
