= So Cruel =

Song by U2

from the album Achtung Baby
- Released: 18 November 1991
- Recorded: February – September 1991
- Studio: Elsinore (Dublin); Windmill Lane Studios (Dublin)
- Genre: Rock
- Length: 5:49
- Label: Island
- Composer: U2
- Lyricist: Bono
- Producer: Daniel Lanois

Music video
- "So Cruel" from From the Sky Down on YouTube

"So Cruel" is a song by rock band U2. It is the sixth track on their 1991 album Achtung Baby, concluding side one of the album. The song was written at Elsinore in Dalkey. While audio engineer Flood changed reels to listen to a demo of another song, lead singer Bono began to improvise a song on guitar. The rest of the band quickly joined in, creating the first take of the song. It was developed as an acoustic track, with Flood adding overdubs and additional elements later. Bassist Adam Clayton and Flood noted that the technology in the studio was crucial in transforming the acoustic song into the final mix.

During the recording sessions for Achtung Baby, guitarist the Edge separated from his wife, Aislinn O'Sullivan. The separation had a major effect on the development of the song, as Bono channelled their pain into the lyrics. Bono said "there were lots of other things going on internally within the band and outside it, and I was working through all of that", noting that the Edge's separation from Aislinn was just one component of that. Thematically the song is about unrequited love, jealousy, obsession, and possessiveness. The track was favourably received by critics.

== Writing and inspiration ==
"So Cruel" was developed by lead singer Bono. Following the recording sessions at Hansa Studios in West Berlin in 1990, U2 resumed the album's sessions in February 1991 at the seaside manor Elsinore in Dalkey, renting the house for £10,000 per month. Producer Daniel Lanois' strategy was to record in houses, mansions, or castles, as he believed it brought atmosphere to the recordings. During the recording at Elsinore, while working on another song, audio engineer Flood changed the reel to listen to an earlier take. Bono picked up a guitar and began to sing. The rest of the band quickly joined in. Flood said, "All of a sudden, almost in the time it had taken for me to wind off the reel and wind the next reel on, it was quite obvious that there was a song about to pop out, and if I wasn't suddenly taking the reel off and getting a new piece of tape on, and changing from monitoring a backing track downstairs to everybody's in the control room wanting to record now, it would never have happened."

"So Cruel" was developed acoustically, with guitarist the Edge playing an acoustic guitar, bassist Adam Clayton playing an acoustic bass, and drummer Larry Mullen Jr. using a bodhrán. Author John D. Luerssen interpreted the song as beginning "with the same kind of basic approach to songcraft that gave wings to 'She's a Mystery to Me'". Bono said that "People thought it was too traditional, one more attempt at writing a song for Roy Orbison". Lyrically, it was also inspired by Scott Walker. Bono said, "His is a very delicate mode of expression on the outside, though too often it is laced underneath with a lot of pain and rage."

According to Clayton, Flood "did a couple of treatments to the track that utterly transformed it." He keyed Clayton's bass with the bodhrán, which "gave it a much more bubbly, off-beat feel". This was followed by some overdubbing and the laying down of a full drum track. Flood said, "I think the way we shifted around the rhythm was very important... The bass is played, but in the studio we doctored it to change the emphasis of where the bass line lay. That turned it into something that had a more unique feel about it, meshed against the song." Duchess Nell Catchpole was brought in to play violin and viola for the song. The strings were arranged by the Edge and producer Brian Eno. Clayton explained that while the original acoustic version "wasn't something one could imagine being on the record", it "was lifted up by studio trickery." Flood believes that the use of technology was crucial in making the final mix. An early version of the track was later released on some versions of the 20th anniversary reissue of Achtung Baby.

== Themes ==
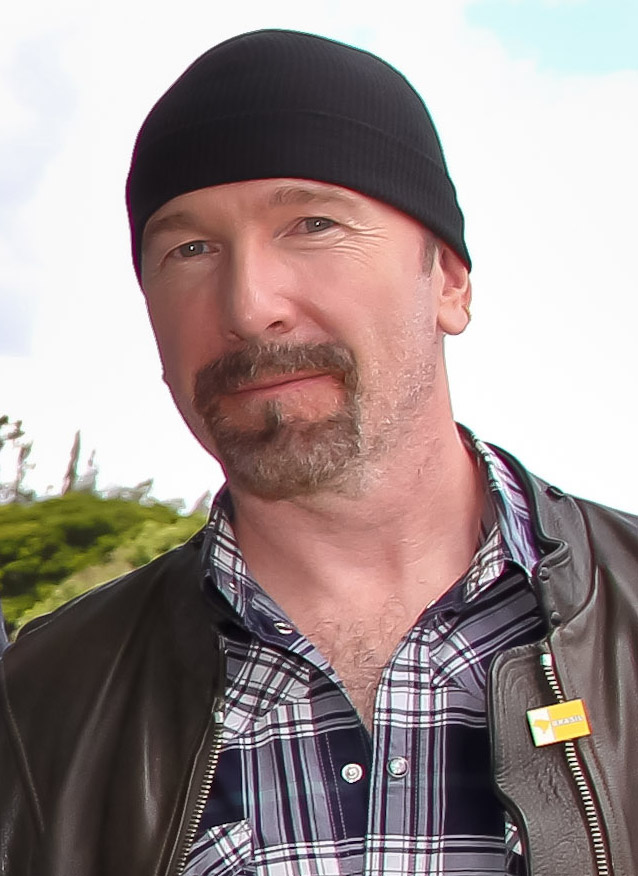
The Edge (pictured in 2011) separated from his wife during the recording of Achtung Baby. Their painful emotions were channelled in the lyrics.

During the recording sessions for Achtung Baby, the Edge separated from his wife, Aislinn O'Sullivan. Reflecting on the impact it had on U2, Bono said, "We're a really tight community. This is not like somebody's, you know, girlfriend's left. We've grown up with these people, this our family, our community. This was really hard for us... It was like the first cracks on the beautiful porcelain jug with those beautiful flowers in it that was our music and our community, starting to go 'crack'." The Edge explained that travelling to Berlin to write and record provided him with an escape from his failing marriage: "I was disappearing into the music for a different reason. It was a refuge in a way. That approach didn't completely work. You know, I wasn't really... in a good positive headspace. I was running away, I suppose." Hot Press editor Niall Stokes noted that in the lyrics, "Bono is clearly drawing on the experiences of those close to him, and particularly on the emotional turmoil that the Edge and Aislinn had been going through." Bono said "that's in there, but it's unfair to lump it all on the Edge and Aislinn splitting up. That was one of the saddest things... But that was only one part of it. There were lots of other things going on internally within the band and outside it, and I was working through all of that. People are desperately trying to hold onto each other in a time when that's very difficult. Looking around, you see how unprepared for it all people are, and the deals they make."

Thematically, "So Cruel" also deals with unrequited love, jealousy, obsession, and possessiveness. Stokes described it as "the desolate complaint of a lover who has been spurned but who remains in love with his tormentor." Uncut contributor Gavin Martin said "the lyrics of the song reinforce the idea of Achtung Baby as a kind of romantic masque, where images of love, debased or abandoned, abound." Elizabeth Wurtzel of The New Yorker noted "with its lovely string arrangements, winding keyboards, and frothy, hypnotic melodies, is reminiscent of Tommy James's "Crimson and Clover", except that every lovingly sweet line is contrasted with a bitterly ironic counter line", citing the lyric "I disappeared in you / You disappeared from me / I gave you everything you wanted / It wasn't what you wanted" as an example. Hubert Dreyfuss, a professor of philosophy at the University of California, Berkeley and Mark Wrathall, a humanities professor at Brigham Young University, believed that the song was an exploration into philosophical dualism. Quoting the lyric "Head of heaven, fingers in the mire", they said "if we are essentially dual in this way, then any attempt to overcome one side in favour of the other inevitably ends in despair", comparing the underlying philosophy to Blaise Pascal's Pensées.

Author Višnja Cogan wrote "Women... never get treated badly in U2 songs... Women are put on a pedestal by Bono, his mother's untimely death being undoubtedly one of the reasons. If anything, in some of the songs on Achtung Baby, it is the man who gets the raw deal. On 'So Cruel', it is the man who is the victim of a woman. It is the reverse of the classical torch song". Quoting the lyric "Her skin is pale like God's only dove / Screams like an angel for your love / Then she makes you watch her from above / And you need her like a drug", he added "The man is manipulated by the woman's sexual power. He is incapable of pulling himself out of this relationship and despite his best efforts, he comes back to her." He noted that the woman is portrayed as "cruel, unreliable and unfaithful. She can only betray him and the duality between love and lust is well depicted in the song." Cogan concluded by saying "unlike the classical torch song, this one ends with the man seemingly deciding to leave the woman... The only thing we don't know in the end is whether he actually acts on his promise or not."

Conversely, author Deane Galbraith believed the song was told from the woman's viewpoint, saying "a woman is unable to receive love without also hating those who love her. She acts simultaneously as tender lover and cruel sadist. The lyrics that describe her 'like an angel' are immediately juxtaposed with a more sordid description that pictures her love as an addictive and manipulative drug. Instead of the subtle and vivifying transcendence of a heavenly angel, when she offers to take her lover higher, he is forced to watch her while she controls him 'from above'. For this is a fallen angel, not purely good or evil, but a lover whose best intentions are insidiously corrupt".

== Reception ==
"So Cruel" was favourably received by critics. Hot Press editor Niall Stokes called it "dark, bitter, intense and masochistic", believing the lyrics to be the aspect that made the song memorable. He added, "As a statement about marital infidelity, the sense of betrayal that accompanies it and the rage that almost inevitably follows, it would be hard to surpass." Uncut contributor Gavin Martin rated the song four stars, calling it "lustful and lustrous". He said that "the Edge's looped five-note piano motif is encircled by a sabre-rattling guitar and a fine synthesized string part; lushly multi-dimensional, pregnant with poise and feeling" and that the theme of "marital disharmony and emotional desolation" underpinning Achtung Baby was especially evident on the song. Greg Potter of The Vancouver Sun wrote that it was "riddled with images of self-doubt and uncertainty". Elysa Gardner of Rolling Stone said, "Bono sounds humbler and more vulnerable than in the past", noting that he "[acknowledges] his own potential for hypocrisy and inadequacy, and addressing basic human weaknesses rather than the failings of society at large".

Steve Morse of The Boston Globe called it an "embittered love [song]" with "a minimalist drum sound from Larry Mullen and an even more minimalist vocal from Bono." Jon Pareles of The New York Times wrote that "[love is] a state of desperation or a bitter memory... The marchlike 'So Cruel' [ricochets] from fond reminiscence to vindictiveness to accusations, some of them directed at the narrator himself". Writing for the Boston Herald, Julie Romandetta called "So Cruel" a "broken-hearted [lament]" that was "lushly orchestrated". Robert Hillburn of the Los Angeles Times believed that it was one of U2's best tracks, describing it as "pulsating and accusatory". Brian Eno described the song as "epic and intimate, passionate and chill".

== Live performances ==
U2 performed "So Cruel" three full times live on the Zoo TV Tour. The first appearance was on 22 May 1992 in Milan, Italy, on the second leg of the tour when, at the end of "Bad", Bono sang a few lines of "So Cruel" in place of "All I Want Is You". In August 1992, a few days prior to the commencement of the third leg of the tour, U2 rehearsed the song in Hershey, Pennsylvania. The second performance in concert was on 22 August 1992 in Foxboro, Massachusetts. Bono performed the song acoustically. Concert historian Pimm Jal de la Parra said that it "[chilled] the crowd." The final performances occurred on 9 and 15 September 1992 in Pontiac, Michigan, and Chicago, Illinois respectively. On both occasions it was played in place of "All I Want Is You". Abbreviated performances, recorded at Hansa Studios, appear in the 2011 documentary From the Sky Down. During the U2:UV Achtung Baby Live at the Sphere residency in Las Vegas, "So Cruel" was played as a regular part of the set, during the second side of Achtung Baby.

== Covers ==
Depeche Mode reworked the song for the 2011 tribute album AHK-toong BAY-bi Covered. "We first heard Achtung Baby working on Songs of Faith and Devotion with Flood," remarked Martin Gore. "It was the closest our bands ever got: U2 had become more electronic, while Depeche Mode were working on a new rock vision. But there was never a rivalry. Bono used reverse psychology in his email (requesting the band's participation in the tribute album), saying he totally understood why we'd say no. We just thought, 'Why not?' 'So Cruel' is Bono at his best, words-wise. And we couldn't tackle 'One' – that would be almost sacrilegious."

== Credits and personnel ==
U2

- Bono – vocals, guitar
- The Edge – guitar, keyboards, backing vocals
- Adam Clayton – bass guitar
- Larry Mullen Jr. – drums, percussion

Additional performer

- Duchess Nell Catchpole – violin, viola
- The Edge, Brian Eno – string arrangement

Technical

- Production – Daniel Lanois
- Engineering – Flood
- Engineering assistance – Robbie Adams
- Mixing – Flood, Brian Eno
- Mixing assistance – Shannon Strong

== See also ==
- List of covers of U2 songs – "So Cruel"
