= Ultraviolet (Light My Way) =

Song by U2

from the album Achtung Baby
- Released: 18 November 1991
- Recorded: October 1990 - September 1991
- Genre: Rock
- Length: 5:31
- Label: Island
- Composer: U2
- Lyricist: Bono
- Producer: Daniel Lanois with Brian Eno

Audio sample
- "Ultraviolet (Light My Way)": file; help

"Ultraviolet (Light My Way)" is a song by Irish rock band U2. It is the tenth track from their seventh studio album Achtung Baby. Ostensibly about love and dependency, the song also lends itself to religious interpretations, with listeners finding allusions to the Book of Job and writers finding spiritual meaning in its invocation of the light spectrum.

The song's composition and recording incorporate both serious and throwaway elements, in keeping with the rest of Achtung Baby. While not released as a single, the song has appeared in two films and a U2 business venture was named after it. "Ultraviolet" played a featured role during the encores of the group's 1992–1993 Zoo TV Tour, 2009–2011 U2 360° Tour, and the Joshua Tree Tour 2017.

== Recording ==
"Ultraviolet (Light My Way)" began as two different demos, one variously called "Ultraviolet" and "69" (which eventually evolved into the b-side "Lady with the Spinning Head") and an alternately arranged demo called "Light My Way". Over the course of the recording sessions, U2 added various overdubs to the song, but producer Brian Eno believed these additions negatively impacted the track. Eno aided the group in editing down the song, and he explained his assistance as such: "I'd go in and say, 'The song has gone, whatever it is you liked about this song is not there anymore. Sometimes, for example, the song would have disappeared under layers of overdubs."

== Composition and interpretation ==
"Ultraviolet (Light My Way)" is written in a 4/4 time signature. The lyrics of "Ultraviolet (Light My Way)" are addressed to a lover, and imply that their relationship is threatened by some sort of personal or spiritual crisis, coupled with a sense of unease over obligations. Indeed, lead vocalist Bono has called the song "a little disturbed".

The song opens with 45 seconds of soft synthesizers and ethereal vocals, somewhat akin in atmospherics to the group's early 1980s songs "Tomorrow" and "Drowning Man"; during this, Bono laments that "sometimes I feel like checking out." This is followed by the entrance of drums and guitar in a familiar U2 rhythm, as Bono describes the burdens of love and how he is "in the black; can't see or be seen." Each verse culminates with the refrain "Baby, baby, baby, light my way." Flood, who engineered and mixed the recording, noted that there was considerable laughter and debate during the sessions about whether Bono could get away with singing the repeated "baby"s, one of the most heavily used clichés in pop songs and one that he had avoided up to that point in his songwriting; Flood later commented that "he got away with it alright."

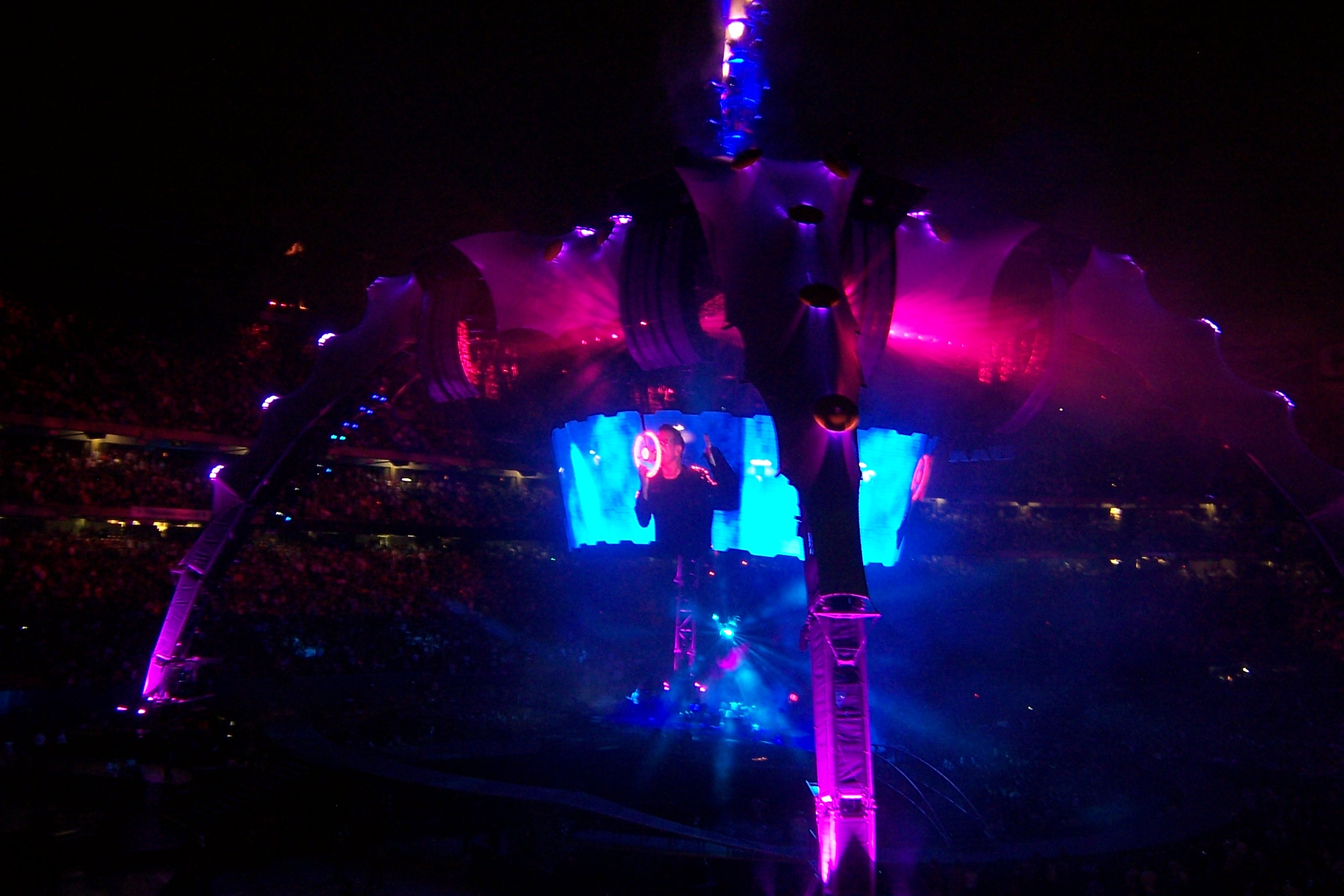
The U2 360° Tour staging of "Ultraviolet" features the claw-like stage awash in indigo and violet light.

Although the song is ostensibly about love and dependency, like many U2 songs, it also lends itself to religious interpretations. Listeners have heard an allusion to the Book of Job 29:2–3 and its tale of God serving as a lamp upon Job's head walking through the darkness. Robyn Brothers suggests that ultraviolet light is "a metaphor for a divine force both unseen to the naked eye and ultimately unknowable to the human intellect." Conversely, Steve Stockman, author of Walk On: The Spiritual Journey Of U2, sees "Ultraviolet" as being about Bono's wife Ali Hewson, and "how when he feels like trash, she makes him clean," but says there is good reason to interpret the song as being just as much about God. The song's title supports this view: indigo and violet rarely appear in song lyrics as frequently as other colours, while ultraviolet represents an unseen wavelength beyond the visible spectrum.

As such, the title evokes the image of black light or an invisible force permeating the darkness, whose connotations are spiritual and personal, as well as technological, reflecting themes of modern alienation explored elsewhere on Achtung Baby and its follow-up album, Zooropa. Dianne Ebertt Beeaff, author of A Grand Madness: Ten Years on the Road with U2, sees the song's narrator as longing for assistance from any source, religious or secular: "This is a real plea, a bleary worn-down drained wish to disappear. A drowning man desperate to hold hands in the darkness, to have someone else point the way, to be safe and obscure." Atara Stein sees "Ultraviolet" as one of several selections on the album in which the protagonist in crisis has elevated his lover into an object of worship, desperate for her to "return to her initial role as his guide and salvation."

"Ultraviolet" is also one of several songs Bono has written on the theme of woman as spirit, and it echoes the band's 1980 song "Shadows and Tall Trees" by juxtaposing love with the image of ceilings. A line in Raymond Carver's late 1980s poem "Suspenders", about the quiet that comes into a house where no one can sleep, was subconsciously recycled by Bono into the lyric. In Achtung Baby's running order, "Ultraviolet" serves, with the other two songs at the album's end, "Acrobat" and "Love Is Blindness", to explore how couples face the task of reconciling the suffering they have imposed on each other.

The song features a Motown sound-style "telegraph key" rhythm, which gave it the feeling of a pop song. This and the "baby, baby" refrain gave the song a throwaway quality that fit in with Achtung Baby's mission of deconstructing U2's image. Paradoxically, the arrangement also featured U2's 1980s "repeato-riff" guitar style and the rest of the lyric was a serious love song that dealt with themes of anxiety and despair. Bono has described "Ultraviolet" as "an epic U2 song [but] the key of it left my voice in a conversational place and allowed a different kind of lyric writing." Producer Eno wrote that a combination of opposites within each song was a signature characteristic of Achtung Baby and that as part of that, "Ultraviolet" had a "helicopterish melancholy". In Achtung Baby's album package, "Ultraviolet" is presented next to a photograph of a crumbling Berlin building that has a Trabant parked in front of it.

== Reception ==
Rolling Stone noted that "Ultraviolet" was one of the album's songs that hearkened more to the group's past than their new sound, saying that Edge's "soaring peals on [it] are instantly recognizable". Jon Pareles of The New York Times wrote that compared to much of the album's grim depictions of personal relations, "Ultraviolet" depicts love as a haven. In contrast, U2 write John Jobling sees "Ultraviolet" as continuing the album's theme of "two people tearing each other apart", despite its "spectral pop" arrangement.

The Boston Globe heard echoes of The Rolling Stones' 1966 song "Out of Time" in the chorus of "Ultraviolet". Entertainment Weekly called it the album's highlight, "where Bono's soaring voice and the Edge's pointillistic guitar meld to create one of those uplifting moments we listen to U2 for". Cedarville University literature professor Scott Calhoun says of one lyrical portion of "Ultraviolet", "That's so evocative and works as beautiful writing away from the music. It can stand on its own on the page and, of course, it's even more effective when accompanied by the music."

Other writers were less enthusiastic. Q magazine felt that the song was weak and that "Bono falls back on his old habit of trying to be 'inspirational' by banging up the heat from simmer to meltdown between the verse and chorus." U2 chroniclers Bill Graham and Caroline van Oosten de Boer also see the song as a throwback to the group's earlier sound, but say that "the band doesn't sufficiently develop the initial idea to warrant the five minutes of 'Ultra Violet'".

While "Ultraviolet" was not released as a single, it was used in a scene at the end of the 2006 Adam Sandler film Click, in which Sandler's character drives home from Bed, Bath and Beyond to happily see his family, and make up for the mistakes he made with his universal remote control. It was also featured in the 2007 film The Diving Bell and the Butterfly.

The name Ultra Violet was also given to one of U2's improvised mid-1990s business initiatives, a joint merchandising venture with MCA Inc.'s Winterland division; the partnership soon dissolved, but not before producing several hundred thousand pairs of Bono "Fly" glasses.

== Live performances ==
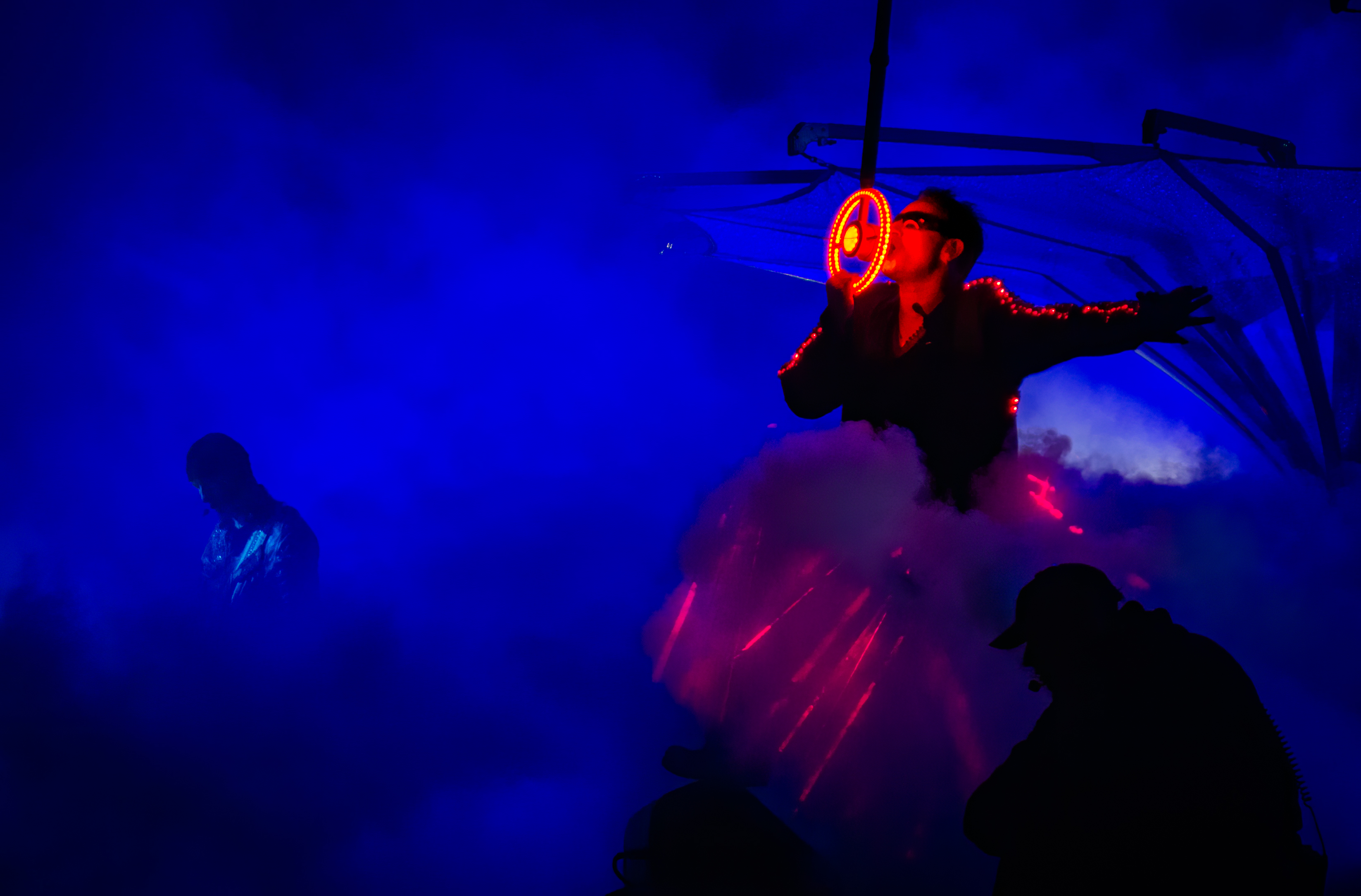
Performances of "Ultraviolet" on the 360° Tour consisted of Bono wearing a laser-embedded suit and singing with a microphone embedded into a glowing steering wheel that hung from above.

"Ultraviolet" was first performed at Lakeland Arena in Lakeland, Florida on 29 February 1992 at the start of the Zoo TV Tour, and it remained a staple of the band's set lists for the first four legs of the tour, often preceded by a prank call by Bono as his alter-egos Mirror Ball Man or Mr. MacPhisto. The Edge played the song on his Gibson Explorer. It was staged with silver-and-mauve lights thrown against two glitter balls, causing light fragments to swirl around the audience, and with lasers flashing in quick rhythms. Anthony DeCurtis of Rolling Stone characterised its essence as "desperately searching" and said that it helped transition the Zoo TV show towards an ambiguous, introspective conclusion. It became writer Beeaff's favourite live song on the tour, with Bono's intense, unrestrained singing producing a strong communal energy; she singled out the March 1992 Hampton Coliseum show as one in which Bono's fervent performance approached the point of emotional breakdown and generated "a transcendent and draining experience for everyone." Although acknowledging the song is an "epic ... with some gorgeous aspects", Edge has said the song is unwieldy to play live. During Zoo TV, almost all of the numbers from Achtung Baby (and the rest of the set list) were augmented by sequencers to fill out the sound; on "Ultraviolet", under-the-stage keyboard tech Des Broadberry playing a sampled guitar figure in the background during Edge's solo parts. Its last performance as part of the tour was on 28 August 1993 in Dublin, after which the song was retired and did not appear on any of U2's next three subsequent tours (PopMart, Elevation, and Vertigo).

The song was revived a decade and a half later with the launch of the U2 360° Tour on 30 June 2009 in Barcelona, where it was once again performed as part of the encore. It was introduced by a robotic voice reading excerpts from the poem "Funeral Blues" by W. H. Auden, followed by Bono's appearance wearing a laser-studded jacket on a darkened stage illuminated only by a glowing steering wheel-shaped microphone that hangs from above. During the performance, Bono would alternatively embrace or hang from the microphone, or twirl around it, or swing it overhead to emphasize the lyrics. The New York Times said its use as "a love song that can double as devotional" helped keep the show's music and messages in balance, while the Chicago Tribune said that Bono sang the song with fervor as part of an encore during which "the show's outsized ambitions produced a neon-lighted moment that nearly justified the costly enterprise." Rolling Stone called the song's performance "one of the show's highpoints." "Ultraviolet" continued to be performed during the encore throughout the first two legs of the tour, with minor changes such as the use of a different introduction.

The band also played the song during its television appearance on Saturday Night Live on 26 September 2009. In an appearance that avoided both their recent singles and best-known hits, "Ultraviolet" was played as the group's third number, in full 360° Tour staging style as the show's end credits scrolled.

The song was performed on the Joshua Tree Tours 2017 and 2019, accompanied by images of historical female figures and achievers on the video screen.

U2 performed "Ultraviolet (Light My Way)" during their 2023–2024 U2:UV Achtung Baby Live residency at the Sphere in the Las Vegas Valley. During performances, "cascading vaporous rainbows" danced across the venue's interior LED screen, according to Pollstar's Andy Gensler.

== Covers ==
The Killers reworked the song for the 2011 tribute album AHK-toong BAY-bi Covered. "Achtung Baby was U2's 'Holy shit!' moment," remarked drummer Ronnie Vannucci Jr. "I was in high school when it came out and we'd drive around in my friend's mom's car and rock that shit all the time. When we were asked to record a cover, 'Ultraviolet' was a unanimous choice. It's reassuring to know that we're still on the same page after all these years. We brought it back to its bare bones, dumbed it down a little, took it back to the rock song underneath."

The beginning of the song was also sampled by Enigma in their 1994 song "The Eyes of Truth".

== See also ==
- List of covers of U2 songs - Ultraviolet (Light My Way)
