= Acrobat (U2 song) =

Song by U2

from the album Achtung Baby
- Released: 18 November 1991
- Recorded: October 1990 – September 1991
- Studio: Hansa Ton Studios (Berlin); Elsinore (Dublin); Windmill Lane Studios (Dublin)
- Genre: Alternative rock
- Length: 4:30
- Label: Island
- Composer: U2
- Lyricist: Bono
- Producer: Daniel Lanois

"Acrobat" is a song by rock band U2, and is the eleventh track on their 1991 album Achtung Baby. The song developed from a riff created by guitarist the Edge, and is played in a 12/8 time signature. Lyrically, the song expresses themes of hypocrisy, alienation, and moral confusion. Although "Acrobat" was rehearsed prior to the third leg of the Zoo TV Tour, it had not been performed live until its debut on the Experience + Innocence Tour on 2 May 2018.

== Inspiration, writing, and recording ==
"Their strategy had been radical. Take everything you know and throw it out. Work with music you don't know, in a place you don't know, in a way you haven't worked before. Disorientate yourself."

— Niall Stokes

Lead singer Bono was influenced by the work of Delmore Schwartz when writing the lyrics of "Acrobat", to whom the song is dedicated. The title of his first book, In Dreams Begin Responsibilities, is quoted in the final verse. Bono noted the book "was on my mind when I was writing the words... It's hard to wrap the book up in a few lines, but Delmore Schwartz is kind of a formalist... I'm the opposite. I'm in the mud as a writer, so I could do with a bit of [Schwartz], and that's why I enjoy him." The song was developed from a riff guitarist The Edge developed during a soundcheck in Auckland, New Zealand, on the Lovetown Tour in 1989. He noted that the beat is unusual for a U2 song, saying it "was the jumping off point, to try and do something with an unusual beat."

Producer Daniel Lanois became disoriented with the direction U2 took "Acrobat" during its recording. Bono noted "Daniel had such a hard time on that... he was trying to get us to play to our strengths and I didn't want to. I wanted to play to our weaknesses. I wanted to experiment." Bono noted that the end product "doesn't quite get off the ground the way I'd hoped it would." An early mix of the track was included on some versions of the 20th anniversary reissue of Achtung Baby. The mix, titled "'Baby' Acrobat", contained lyrics that were later modified to a different perspective ("You know I'd hit out if I only knew who to hit" instead of the final "I know you'd hit out if you only knew who to hit") or scrapped entirely ("If the sky turns to purple and the moon turns to blood / Will you dig me out when I'm face down in the mud").

== Composition and theme ==
"It is a song about your own spleen, your own hypocrisy, your own ability to change shape and take on the colours of whatever environment you're in, like a chameleon."

— Bono

"Acrobat" is played in a 12/8 time signature. The Edge noted "it's a very Irish time signature, it's used in a lot of traditional Irish music, but in rock and roll you don't really hear it that much."

In the time leading up to the start of the Achtung Baby sessions, U2 listened to records which had a "hard-edged industrial kind of sound", including works by KMFDM and Sonic Youth, as well as artists such as Roy Orbison and Jacques Brel. These influences led the band to seek the creation of songs which were harder musically than their previous work, while remaining personal lyrically.

"Acrobat" is one of the most personal songs on Achtung Baby with Bono acknowledging personal weakness, contradictions, and inadequacy. The Edge noted that the song contained "a bit of venom", likening it to "the bitter, John Lennon tradition of 'Working Class Hero', slightly snarling and cynical." Bono stated "as we moved from the eighties to the nineties, I stopped throwing rocks at the obvious symbols of power and the abuse of it. I started throwing rocks at my own hypocrisy... 'Acrobat' [goes] 'Don't believe what you hear, don't believe what you see / If you just close your eyes / You can feel the enemy...' I can't remember it, but the point is: you start to see the world in a different way, and you're part of the problem, not just part of the solution". In 2006, he noted it was "a song about being a hypocrite, and I think we all can be and I certainly have been. And you know, you exact very high standards on people in the world but then you don't live them personally", noting the theme was most evident in the lyric "I must be an acrobat to talk like this and act like that". Hot Press editor Niall Stokes felt The Edge's guitar playing combined elements of "Where the Streets Have No Name" with "Bullet the Blue Sky". Speaking of its theme he said "at its heart is an awareness of the ravages of time, and what it does to people and to relationships. But beyond that, there is the self-awareness that, itself, comes only with experience... Bono acknowledges his own weakness and inadequacy. He is more conscious now than ever before of the contradictions in his own position." Andy Greene of Rolling Stone believed the "aggressive and venomous" song reflected Bono's thoughts during the album sessions, saying "Nearly every lyric brims with rage... It was a new decade and it was quite possible they were about to be dismissed as a relic of the past."

U2 biographer Bill Flanagan credits Bono's habit of keeping his lyrics "in flux until the last minute" with providing a narrative coherence to the album. Flanagan interpreted Achtung Baby as using the moon as a metaphor for a dark woman seducing the singer away from his virtuous love, the sun; he is tempted away from domestic life by an exciting nightlife and tests how far he can go before returning home. For Flanagan, the final three songs on Achtung Baby—"Ultraviolet (Light My Way)", "Acrobat", and "Love Is Blindness"—are about how the couple deal with the suffering they have forced on each other. Hot Press writer Joe Jackson felt that the song was dominated by a theme of moral confusion. Author John Luerssen believed the song was about "the fight to persevere". He added it "was long on piss and vinegar, as evidenced by its snarling, cynical approach."

Craig Delancey, an Assistant Professor of Philosophy at the State University of New York, cited the conclusion of "Acrobat" as an example of how rock music can be "profoundly successful at evoking the mixture of anger and contempt that can keep you going in the face of seemingly overwhelming opposition." He noted that "the powerful closing sentiments of Achtung Baby's 'Acrobat' can help us feel motivated and empowered in the face of powers that want us to feel powerless." Timothy Cleveland, the Head of the Philosophy Department at New Mexico State University, wrote that the opening lyric was an introspection of the self. He noted "here feeling is contrasted with perceptual states that make one aware of the world around them. The 'enemy' that one can feel is oneself. 'To feel' in this case refers to a kind of awareness one has of oneself independent of the sensations of the outside world... Like perceptual feeling it is a kind of direct awareness and so a kind of knowledge by acquaintance."

Robyn Brothers felt the line "I'd break bread and wine / If there was a church I could receive in" referenced feelings of spiritual alienation. She compared the song to "Zooropa", stating that both reference a response to uncertainty and an unavoidable feeling of alienation. Writing for Uncut, Gavin Martin wondered if the lyric "What are we going to do now it's all been said / No new ideas in the house, and every book has been read" was an examination of the band's longevity, stating "Bono sounded fragile, wounded, seeming even to ponder the band's usefulness." He noted that it contained references to both Holy Communion and oral sex, and compared it to "The Fly", noting that both songs were "delivered in an amoral voice" and helped to deconstruct the prevailing image of the band. Artist Gavin Friday, a childhood friend of Bono, thought the chorus line "Don't let the bastards grind you down" was a retaliation to the criticism of the press. Elizabeth Wurtzel of The New Yorker felt the line gave the song a political, martyr-complex. She noted that it eventually "unfurls as a song about love facing the long run. It comes as a relief to discover, after all this time, that the guys in U2 are as hormonally charged and concerned with love as the rest of us."

== Reception ==
"Acrobat" received a mixed response from critics. The Kitchener Record felt that the song added to the band's "tremendous presence", saying that it showed the band's commitment to each individual song and that it "indicates a very clear evolution in Bono's lyricism and the band's clear artistic focus." Bono named it one of his favourite U2 songs, a sentiment that The Edge agreed with. Stokes said "For most writers, 'Acrobat' would have been a slow song... it was a brave attempt by a rock 'n' roll band to find a distinctive, hard edge, for what was essentially another love song." Martin rated the track 4 stars, describing it as "deliciously dark". Steve Morse of The Boston Globe felt it was one of the album's "exceptional love songs". Greg Potter of The Vancouver Sun believed it "sums up Bono's lyrical direction and mindset better than any song on the album... alluding to the theory that true contentment must begin from within." Jon Pareles of The New York Times had a more negative opinion of the song, calling the lyrics "pompous". Bill Wyman of Entertainment Weekly was similarly dissenting, stating "'Acrobat' – formless and overwrought – is just a mess."

The theme of moral confusion cited by Jackson was later used in U2's song "Zooropa", from the 1993 album of the same name. The coda in "Zooropa" features the lyric "dream out loud", which Bono included as a reference to "Acrobat". The phrase "dream out loud" was first used by Bono during the Lovetown Tour in 1989, and has appeared several times in U2's work since then, including the song "Always" — a B-side to the "Beautiful Day" single released in 2000 — and being spoken by Bono in the PopMart: Live from Mexico City concert release.

== Live performances ==
"Acrobat" was rehearsed extensively in an acoustic form prior to the third leg of the Zoo TV Tour in 1992. The end of the song segued into the beginning of "Zoo Station", leading concert historian Pimm Jal de la Parra to speculate that it was being considered to open the set. However, the band did not end up performing it during the tour. In 2006, the Edge said "it never became a live favourite... I don't think that is what people come to U2 for." In 2012, Willie Williams, U2's lighting designer and concert director, described the rehearsed version as "extremely dramatic", saying "in a stadium situation it could be argued that it might have the same dramatic impact as walking out on stage and telling the audience to fuck off."

"Acrobat" had not been performed live in more than 26 years, until the band finally gave the song its debut performance during the Experience + Innocence Tour on 2 May 2018. Prior to performances of the song on tour, Bono adopted the stage character "MacPhisto", a representation of the devil that he previously portrayed on 1993 legs of the Zoo TV Tour. The character was depicted through an augmented reality video filter applied to Bono's face on the video displayed on the screens. As MacPhisto, he commented on recent events in the US such as the 2017 Charlottesville rally by riffing on the lyrics from the Rolling Stones' song "Sympathy for the Devil". MacPhisto punctuated this monologue by saying, "when you don't believe that I exist, that's when I do my best work". This segued into performances of "Acrobat". Bassist Adam Clayton confirmed that part of the reason for finally playing the song was because devoted U2 fans had been requesting it. Critics noted the relevance of the song's opening lines "Don't believe what you hear/Don't believe what you see" in the post-truth world of the time.

== Covers ==
The song was covered by the Dutch band Kane on their 2000 live album With or Without You.

Glasvegas reworked the song for the 2011 tribute album AHK-toong BAY-bi Covered. "Doing this, I was fantasising I was Bono, shades and all," remarked singer James Allan. "I was singing the line, 'Don't let the bastards drag you down,' feeling determined rather than angry. Before we started, Rab [Allan, guitarist] said, 'What are you thinking about this U2 cover?' I said, 'Ach, it'll be easy: just make it sound bigger than U2'."

== Personnel ==
U2

- Bono – vocals
- The Edge – guitar, backing vocals
- Adam Clayton – bass guitar
- Larry Mullen, Jr. – drums, percussion

Technical

- Production – Daniel Lanois
- Engineering – Flood
- Mixing – Flood and Lanois
- Engineering and mixing assistance – Shannon Strong

== See also ==
- List of covers of U2 songs - Acrobat
