= Tryin' to Throw Your Arms Around the World =

Song by U2

from the album Achtung Baby
- Released: 18 November 1991
- Genre: Rock
- Length: 3:53
- Label: Island
- Composer: U2
- Lyricist: Bono
- Producer: Daniel Lanois with Brian Eno

"Tryin' to Throw Your Arms Around the World" is a song by Irish rock band U2, and the ninth track on their 1991 album, Achtung Baby. It is a tongue-in-cheek song about stumbling home drunk after a night out on the town. It is dedicated to the Flaming Colossus nightclub in Los Angeles, its lyrics inspired by performances of Flaming Colossus house band CoCu in which bandleader Tommy Jordan, wearing long false arms, would interact playfully with the audience. The album version includes keyboard playing by producer Brian Eno. The line "a woman needs a man like a fish needs a bicycle" is a quotation from Irina Dunn.

== Live performances ==
During live performances on Zoo TV Tour from 1992 to 1993, lead singer Bono would spray a bottle of champagne towards the audience. It was played 136 times on the tour. The song was edited out of the live video release Zoo TV: Live from Sydney; it was later revealed that the concert ran long and the song needed to be edited in order to fit the concert into a two-hour timeslot.

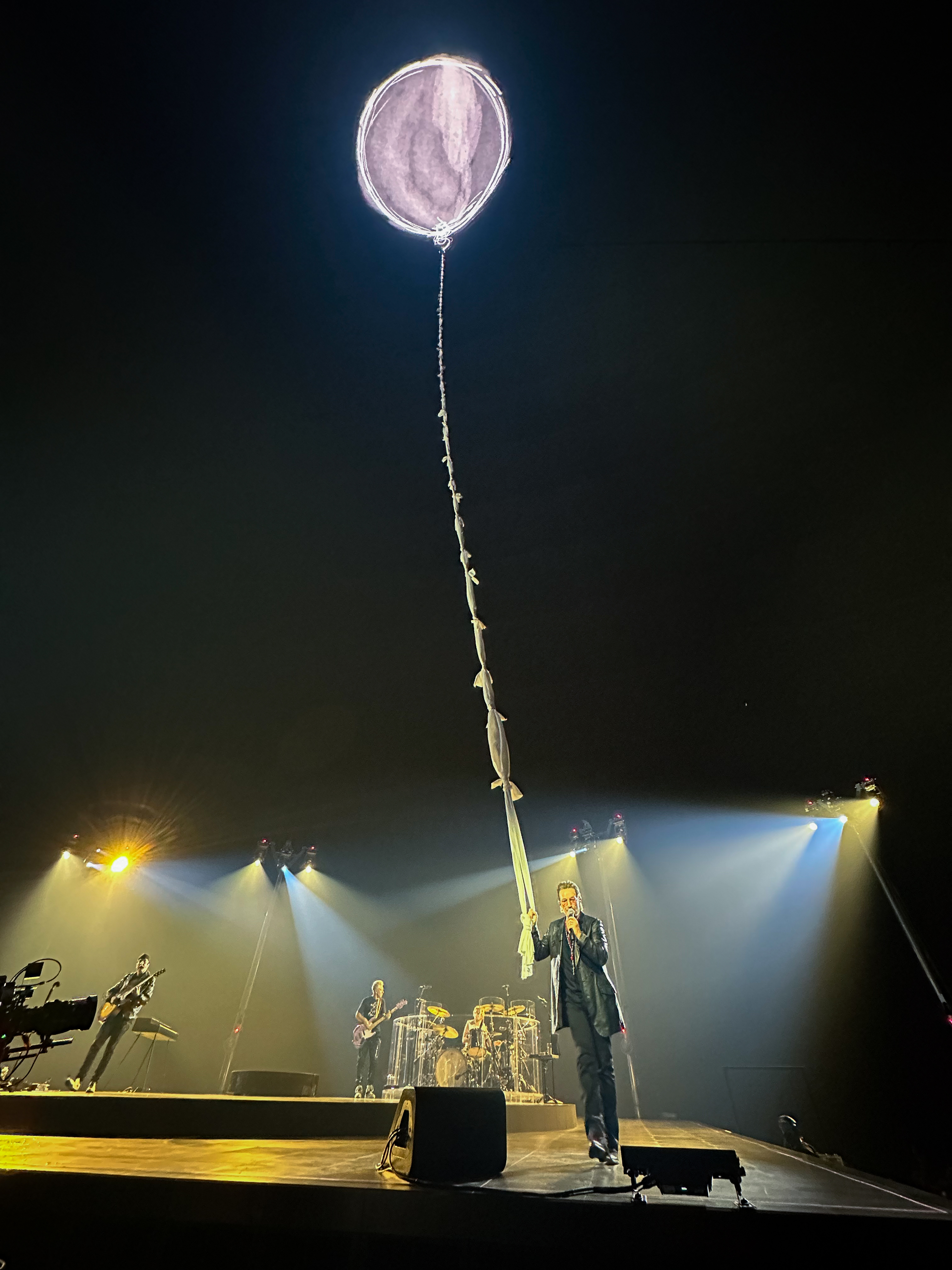
Performances during U2's 2023–2024 concert residency at the Sphere featured Bono "holding" a digital balloon.

Aside from being snippeted at three concerts during the final leg of the U2 360° Tour in July 2011, the song was not performed again until the band's 2023–2024 U2:UV Achtung Baby residency at the Sphere in the Las Vegas Valley. During performances, a digital chalk drawing of a balloon, designed by the Edge's wife Morleigh Steinberg, was displayed high on the venue's LED screen. It was attached to an actual tether of knotted-up bedsheets that Bono held. Initial performances featured him picking a fan from the crowd to join him on stage to hold the tether and swing in it; later performances added a prop door, with the story being that Bono had returned home with the balloon only to realise he was locked out and unable to find his keys as he peered through the peephole.

== Covers ==
The song was reworked for the 2011 tribute album AHK-toong BAY-bi Covered by The Fray. The Denver quartet had supported U2 on the seventh leg of the 360° Tour, during which The Fray's Isaac Slade celebrated his 30th birthday. "They gave me a ping-pong table," he recalled, "and a ping-pong paddle with sunglasses drawn on it."

== Personnel ==
- Bono – lead vocals
- The Edge – guitar, keyboards, backing vocals
- Adam Clayton – bass guitar
- Larry Mullen Jr. – drums, percussion
- Brian Eno – additional keyboards
- Daniel Lanois – additional guitar

== See also ==
- List of covers of U2 songs – Tryin' to Throw Your Arms Around the World
