= Even Better Than the Real Thing =

1992 single by U2

Single by U2

from the album Achtung Baby
- B-side: "Salomé"
- Released: 8 June 1992
- Recorded: 1990–1991
- Genre: Alternative rock; psychedelic rock
- Length: 3:41 (original mix); 6:40 (Perfecto mix); 4:30 (Perfecto mix edit)
- Label: Island
- Composer: U2
- Lyricist: Bono
- Producers: Steve Lillywhite with Brian Eno and Daniel Lanois

U2 singles chronology
"One" (1992)	"Even Better Than the Real Thing" (1992)	"Who's Gonna Ride Your Wild Horses" (1992)

Music video
- "Official Music Video" on YouTube

Alternative cover
- Remixes single

"Even Better Than the Real Thing" is a song by Irish rock band U2, and is the second track on their seventh album, Achtung Baby (1991). It was released as the album's fourth single on 8 June 1992 by Island Records, and it reached number three in Ireland and Canada while becoming a top-10 hit in Austria, New Zealand, and Sweden. A remixed version of the song released the same year peaked at number eight in the United Kingdom and number 10 in Ireland. Its accompanying music video was directed by Kevin Godley. In 1997, readers of Mojo named the song the 71st-best track of the 1990s.

== Writing and recording ==
"Even Better Than the Real Thing" originated from a chorus guitar riff that the Edge composed in Los Angeles during the Rattle and Hum sessions. A demo of the song, called "The Real Thing", was recorded at STS Studios during the same session in which "Desire" was recorded. The band remarked that the song's guitar riff reminded them of the Rolling Stones, but that it sounded "deeply traditional". Consequently, it was shelved until the Achtung Baby recording sessions, when the band took the multitrack recording of the demo to Hansa Studios in Berlin in late 1990. The band made little progress on the demo there, as the Berlin sessions were fraught with conflict and difficulty in completing songs.

The recording sessions, as well as the general mood, improved after the band returned to Dublin in 1991 to record at the "Elsinore" mansion on the Dalkey coastline. The song turned around after the Edge purchased a DigiTech Whammy pitch shifter pedal, which created a "double octave sweep" on the guitar riff. The band rediscovered their sense of fun and incorporated that into the writing of the song. Producer Brian Eno originally argued against the song's inclusion on the album when it contained the lyric "There ain't nothing like the real thing", claiming the song had to be "more ironic". After the lyric was revised to "Even better than the real thing", Eno changed his stance and supported the song's inclusion. Lead vocalist Bono explained the song's lyrics, as well as why the title was lengthened to "Even Better Than the Real Thing": "It was reflective of the times [the band] were living in, when people were no longer looking for the truth, [they] were all looking for instant gratification." Richard Branson requested to use the song in advertisements for his "Virgin Cola" to compete with Coca-Cola (who had been using the tagline "the real thing" for years), but the band declined.

When the covers to "Even Better Than the Real Thing", "The Fly", "Who's Gonna Ride Your Wild Horses", and "Mysterious Ways" are arranged, a picture of the band members driving a Trabant is formed.

== Chart performance ==
The song peaked at number three in Ireland and number 12 in the United Kingdom, becoming one of the few U2 singles that failed to reach the top 10 in the UK Singles Chart. However, a few weeks after its initial release, English DJ Paul Oakenfold remixed the track; this version reached a new peak of number eight. Oakenfold later supported U2 on their PopMart Tour.

In the United States, the original version of the song reached number 32 on the Billboard Hot 100, number one on the Album Rock Tracks chart and number five on the Modern Rock Tracks chart, while the remix peaked at number 27 on the Hot Dance Music/Club Play chart and number 35 on the Hot Dance Music/Maxi-Singles Sales chart. In Canada it reached number three to become the third consecutive top-five hit from Achtung Baby. Elsewhere, the song reached the top 20 in Australia, Austria, Finland, the Netherlands, New Zealand, Sweden and Switzerland.

== Critical reception ==
While reviewing the remix of the song, Paul Mathur from Melody Maker wrote that, "remodelled by Paul Oakenfold, it's the best thing they've done for a while". Roger Morton from New Musical Express explained, "The 'Perfect Mix' is a kind of compromise where for a splendid 60 seconds you don't know it's a U2 record, thanks to the stomp rhythm and clap beats. Then Bono's spliced vocals are released and you end up with a half way House part peaking piano euphoria and "take me higher" gospel choirs, and part arcing guitars and chest-beating. It makes for an adequately propulsive scream up, but then so do the 'Trance Mix' and 'Sexy Dub' mixes where U2 are largely noticeable by their absence. It's more than a novelty but less than a stroke of genius, with a whiff of old rock'n'roller condescension about it, and the nightmare spectre of Bono dancing his way back to God, hanging in the air."

== Music video ==
The music video for "Even Better Than the Real Thing" was directed by Kevin Godley, formerly of 10cc and Godley & Creme, and was produced by Iain Brown. It was shot at two locations: the former Zoo clothes shop located at 32–34 Carnaby Street in London on 11 February 1992, then Pinewood Studios in Buckinghamshire from 12–14 February 1992. The video featured U2 and their own lookalike group The Doppelgangers, which was formed by U2 and Kevin Godley specifically for the video. U2 and The Doppelgangers swap places several times throughout the video, which was also edited with various clips of television footage. The video won two awards at the 1992 MTV Video Music Awards, for Best Group Video and Best Visual Effects; it was shot with a 360-degree camera rollover rig, designed and built by Simon Tayler of Artem in London specifically for the video. The video also uses a snippet of Sega's arcade version of the video game G-LOC: Air Battle, as well as Rail Chase.

== Live performances ==
The song was performed at every date of the band's Zoo TV and PopMart Tours, and was played sporadically on the Elevation Tour. The "Fish Out of Water" remix, later released in the 20th anniversary edition of Achtung Baby, was played as the opening song during the 2011 legs of the U2 360° Tour. This remix would return for performances during the Innocence + Experience Tour.

After missing the entirety of the Joshua Tree Tour 2017 and the first leg of the Experience + Innocence Tour, the song returned to the setlist for the European leg of the Experience + Innocence Tour. The "Fish Out of Water" remix was again used, albeit without the slide guitar intro and less backing tracks. The song would return for the Joshua Tree Tour 2019, performed in the same style as the Experience + Innocence Tour.

U2 performed "Even Better Than the Real Thing" during their 2023–2024 U2:UV Achtung Baby Live residency at the Sphere in the Las Vegas Valley. Performances were accompanied by the video piece "King Size" by Marco Brambilla scrolling from ceiling to floor on the venue's interior LED screen, making the audience feel the false sensation of the stage moving upward. Brambilla spent three-and-a-half months creating the sequence, which featured a kaleidoscopic collage of 1,000 looped video clips depicting Elvis Presley and various Las Vegas iconography. Brambilla was asked to produce visuals that would instill sensory overload in the audience, and from conversations with Bono, he developed the themes of representing the death of Elvis, the birth of Las Vegas, and their parallels with the American Dream. Brambilla trained the artificial intelligence model Stable Diffusion to categorise his personal library of over 12,000 film clips, many of them from Elvis's filmography. He then used Stable Diffusion, along with the text-to-image models DALL-E and Midjourney, to create "fantastical exaggerations" of Elvis based on text prompts.

== Track listings ==
7": Island (IS525) and cassette: Island (CIS515)
No.	Title	Length
1.	"Even Better Than the Real Thing"	3:41
2.	"Salomé"	4:32

12" maxi: Island (12IS515) and CD maxi: Island (CID525)
No.	Title	Length
1.	"Even Better Than the Real Thing"	3:41
2.	"Salomé"	4:32
3.	"Where Did It All Go Wrong?"	3:57
4.	"Lady with the Spinning Head" (Extended dance remix)	6:08

CD maxi: Island C REAL 2 and cassette: Island (422-862 281-4)
No.	Title	Length
1.	"Even Better Than the Real Thing" (Perfecto mix)	6:41
2.	"Even Better Than the Real Thing" (Sexy dub mix)	7:18
3.	"Even Better Than the Real Thing" (Apollo 440 Stealth Sonic remix)	6:42
4.	"Even Better Than the Real Thing" (V16 Exit Wound remix)	3:19
5.	"Even Better Than the Real Thing" (Apollo 440 vs U2 instrumental)	6:27

12" maxi: Island REAL U2
No.	Title	Length
1.	"Even Better Than the Real Thing" (Perfecto mix)	6:37
2.	"Even Better Than the Real Thing" (Trance mix)	6:47
3.	"Even Better Than the Real Thing" (Sexy dub mix)	7:14

== Personnel ==
- Bono – vocals
- The Edge – guitar, backing vocals
- Adam Clayton – bass guitar
- Larry Mullen Jr. – drums
- Production – Steve Lillywhite with Brian Eno and Daniel Lanois
- Engineering – Paul Barrett and Robbie Adams
- Mixing – Steve Lillywhite and Robbie Adams
- Mixing assistance – Sean Leonard

== Charts ==
=== Weekly charts ===
Original version

Chart (1992)	Peak position
Australia (ARIA)	11
Austria (Ö3 Austria Top 40)	8
Belgium (Ultratop 50 Flanders)	21
Canada Top Singles (RPM)	3
Denmark (IFPI)	9
Europe (Eurochart Hot 100)	13
Finland (Suomen virallinen lista)	18
France (SNEP)	34
Germany (GfK)	28
Ireland (IRMA)	3
Italy (Musica e dischi)	6
Netherlands (Dutch Top 40)	8
Netherlands (Single Top 100)	11
New Zealand (Recorded Music NZ)	8
Portugal (AFP)	2
Sweden (Sverigetopplistan)	10
Switzerland (Schweizer Hitparade)	18
UK Singles (Official Charts)	12
UK Airplay (Music Week)	2
US Billboard Hot 100	32
US Alternative Airplay (Billboard)	5
US Mainstream Rock Airplay (Billboard)	1

Remix version

Chart (1992)	Peak position
Australia (ARIA)	167
Ireland (IRMA)	10
UK Singles (Official Charts)	8
UK Dance (Music Week)	3
UK Club Chart (Music Week)	4
US Dance Club Songs (Billboard)	27
US Dance Singles Sales (Billboard)	35

=== Year-end charts ===
Chart (1992)	Position
Australia (ARIA)	79
Canada Top Singles (RPM)	25
Europe (Eurochart Hot 100)	62
Europe (European Hit Radio)	24
Netherlands (Dutch Top 40)	93
Sweden (Topplistan)	53
UK Airplay (Music Week)	19
UK Club Chart (Music Week)	55
US Album Rock Tracks (Billboard)	20
US Modern Rock Tracks (Billboard)	27

== Release history ==
Region	Version	Date	Format(s)	Label(s)	Ref(s).
Europe	Original	8 June 1992	Various	Island	
United Kingdom	Original	8 June 1992	7-inch vinyl; 12-inch vinyl; CD; cassette	Island	
Canada	Original	9 June 1992	CD	Island	
United States	Original	9 June 1992	12-inch vinyl; CD; cassette	Island	
Australia	Original	29 June 1992	7-inch vinyl; 12-inch vinyl; CD; cassette	Island	
Japan	Original	25 July 1992	CD	Island	
Australia	Remix	27 July 1992	12-inch vinyl; CD	Island	

== Covers ==
In his Jacques Lu Cont guise, Stuart Price reworked the song for the 2011 tribute album AHK-toong BAY-bi Covered. "The original multitracks gave me an insight into how U2 worked," he remarked, "but I couldn't be too precious about the track."

Pop band Dead or Alive covered the track for the 1998 tribute album, We Will Follow: A Tribute to U2. An edited version also featured on their album Fragile, released in 2000.

== See also ==
- List of covers of U2 songs - Even Better Than the Real Thing
- List of number-one mainstream rock hits of 1992 (United States)
