= Zoltán Téglás =

American singer (born 1969)

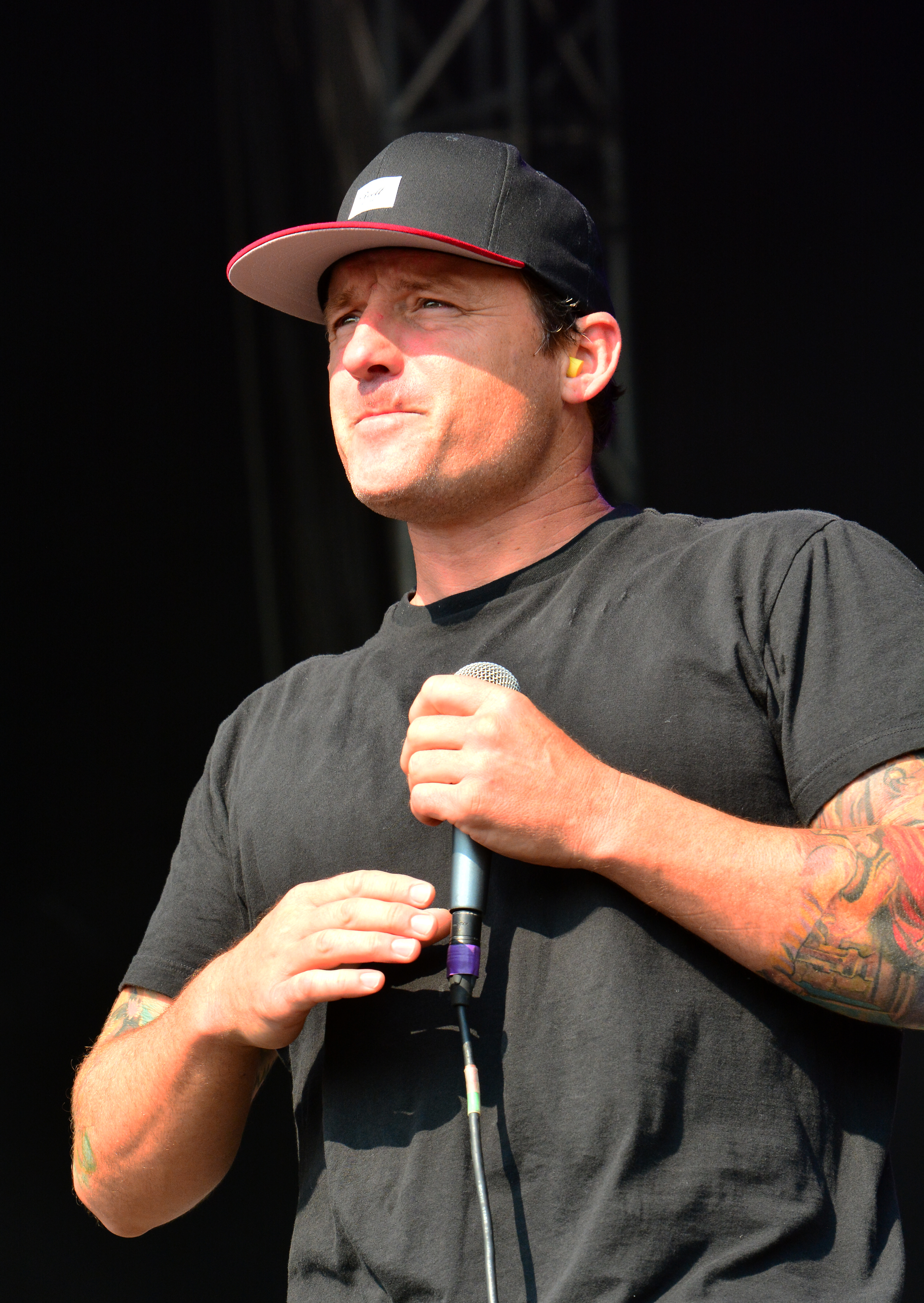
- Téglás at Reload Festival 2015

Background information
- Born: November 10, 1969
- Genres: Punk rock; melodic hardcore; skate punk
- Occupation: Singer
- Years active: 1993–present
- Member of: Zoli Band
- Formerly of: Ignite; Pennywise
- Website: igniteband.com

Zoltán Téglás (born November 10, 1969) is a Hungarian-American singer. He was the frontman of melodic hardcore band Ignite from 1994 to 2020. He was also the lead vocalist of Pennywise for a short time, appearing on their tenth album, All or Nothing. He has collaborated with other bands including the Misfits, Motörhead, Close Your Eyes, and Blind Myself. Téglás has a side project called Zoli Band.

== Career ==
=== Ignite ===
In 1993, Téglás became the lead singer of the California-based band Ignite. In total he recorded five albums with the band: Scarred for Life (1994), Family (1995), A Place Called Home, Our Darkest Days (2006), and A War Against You (2016).

On November 25, 2019, Téglás announced that he was leaving Ignite after 25 years. He said, "With a heavy heart I am announcing my departure from Ignite. I am going to focus most of my time now to rescuing animals and other film and musical endeavors." He performed his final shows with the band in California in early 2020.

=== Pennywise ===
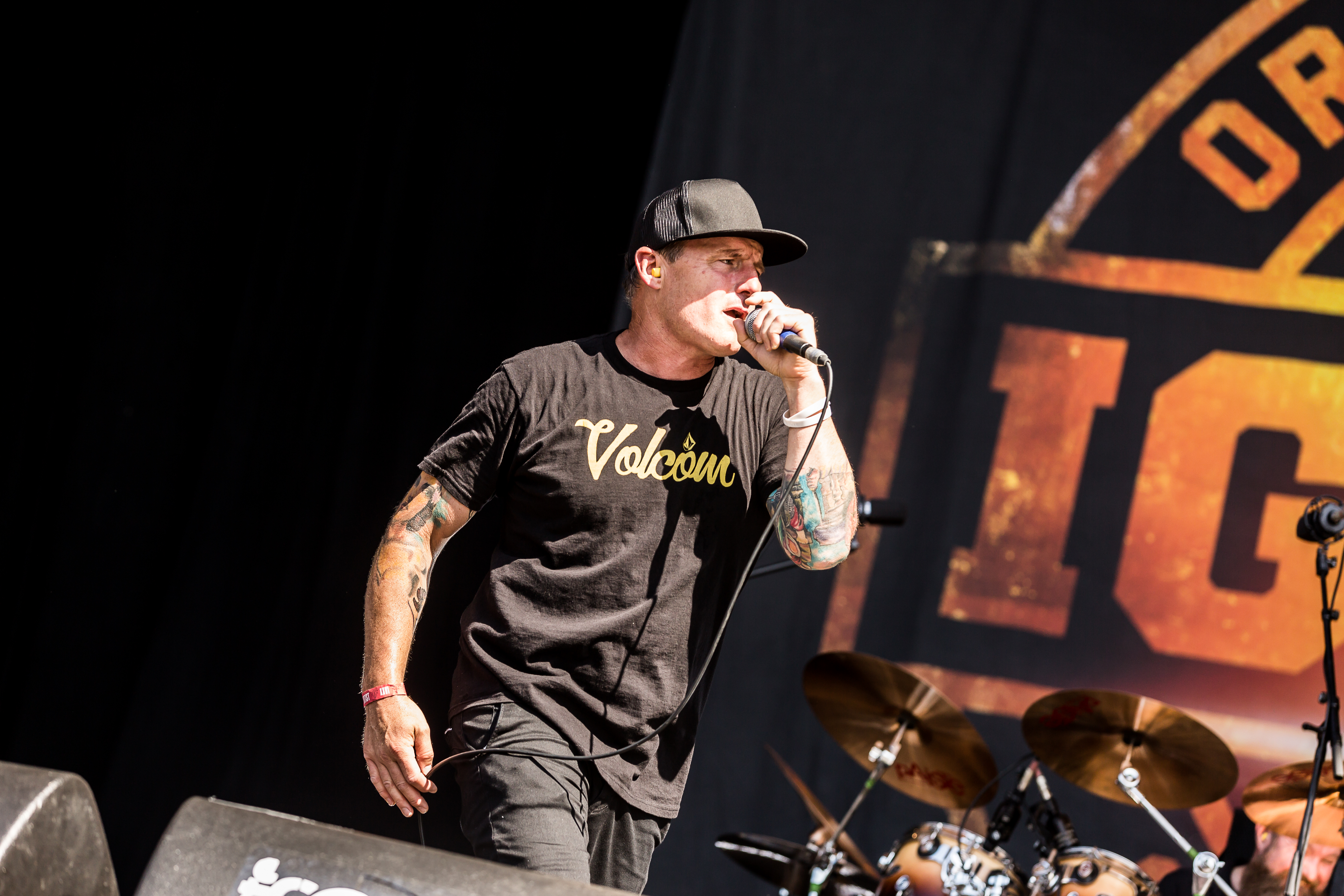
Téglás at With Full Force, 2019

He replaced Jim Lindberg (who pursued a side project as lead singer for his newly formed band The Black Pacific) for a few concerts in Pennywise, after the former left the band in 2009. On February 16, 2010, Pennywise officially announced Téglás as Lindberg's replacement. Pennywise released their tenth studio album All or Nothing on May 1, 2012, their first album with Téglás on vocals. In a May 2012 interview with AMP, Téglás was asked if he was going to make another record with Pennywise. His response was, "I don't know if there is going to be a next time because we might kill each other in the process."

In October 2012, Jim Lindberg rejoined Pennywise, ending Téglás' short term as lead singer.

While touring with Pennywise in 2012, Téglás suffered from back pain due to a herniated disc. He collapsed onstage in Germany during his band's set at the With Full Force festival.

=== Zoli Band ===
Since 2000, Téglás has made music on and off with his solo project, Zoli Band. Their first, self-titled album was released in 2000, followed by Red & Blue in 2010 and Santa Monica in 2019.

=== Other appearances ===
Téglás toured with the Misfits in October–November 2000, filling in on vocals during a number of North American tour dates after Michale Graves left the band. In the Motörhead song "God Was Never on Your Side" (on the album Kiss of Death), Téglás added backing vocals.

In 2006, he helped the Hungarian metalcore band Blind Myself to tour in the US; they sang a song together ("Lost in Time").

== Personal life ==
Téglás' father (now deceased) emigrated to the United States after World War II, his mother in the 1960s; both came from Hungary. Téglás is proud of his Hungarian heritage and has several tattoos with Hungarian motifs and symbols, including Matthias Corvinus, the Coat of arms of Hungary, and a tribute to the 1956 Hungarian Revolution. On a hidden track at the end of "A Place Called Home" and "Our Darkest Days", Téglás sings a traditional folk song in Hungarian. The song "A Place Called Home" is a reworking of a well-known traditional Hungarian folk song, A csitári hegyek alatt, which can be translated as "Under the Mountains of Csitár" (a reference to a northern region that once belonged to Hungary, which is currently in southern Slovakia). Téglás speaks English and Hungarian fluently, having spent much time in the country of his parents.

Téglás is the founder of the Pelican Rescue Team, which rescues pelicans and other sea birds on site, or takes them to a rehabilitation hospital for further treatment. In 2024, he appeared on a CBS Evening News segment about volunteers rescuing starving pelicans in California. In the interview, he described himself as "like the ambulance, the first-line EMT" who transports the weakest, hungriest birds to the wetlands and wildlife center to be treated.

For a time in the late 90s, he worked as a stunt performer; during one filming for a Jackie Chan movie, he suffered a serious spinal injury. He appeared in Spectral in a cameo role.

=== Sea Shepherd ===
Téglás is a supporter of the Sea Shepherd Conservation Society. At the May 2010 Pennywise gig at O2 Academy Birmingham, as well as the December 18 Ignite show at Chain Reaction in Anaheim, California, he wore a Sea Shepherd T-shirt, promoted the organization between songs and had an official Sea Shepherd merchandise stall set up alongside the Pennywise stall. He is also the 'Volunteer Music & Outreach Coordinator' for Sea Shepherd. He is featured on Season 6, Episode 16 of "Hope in the Wild".

== Discography ==
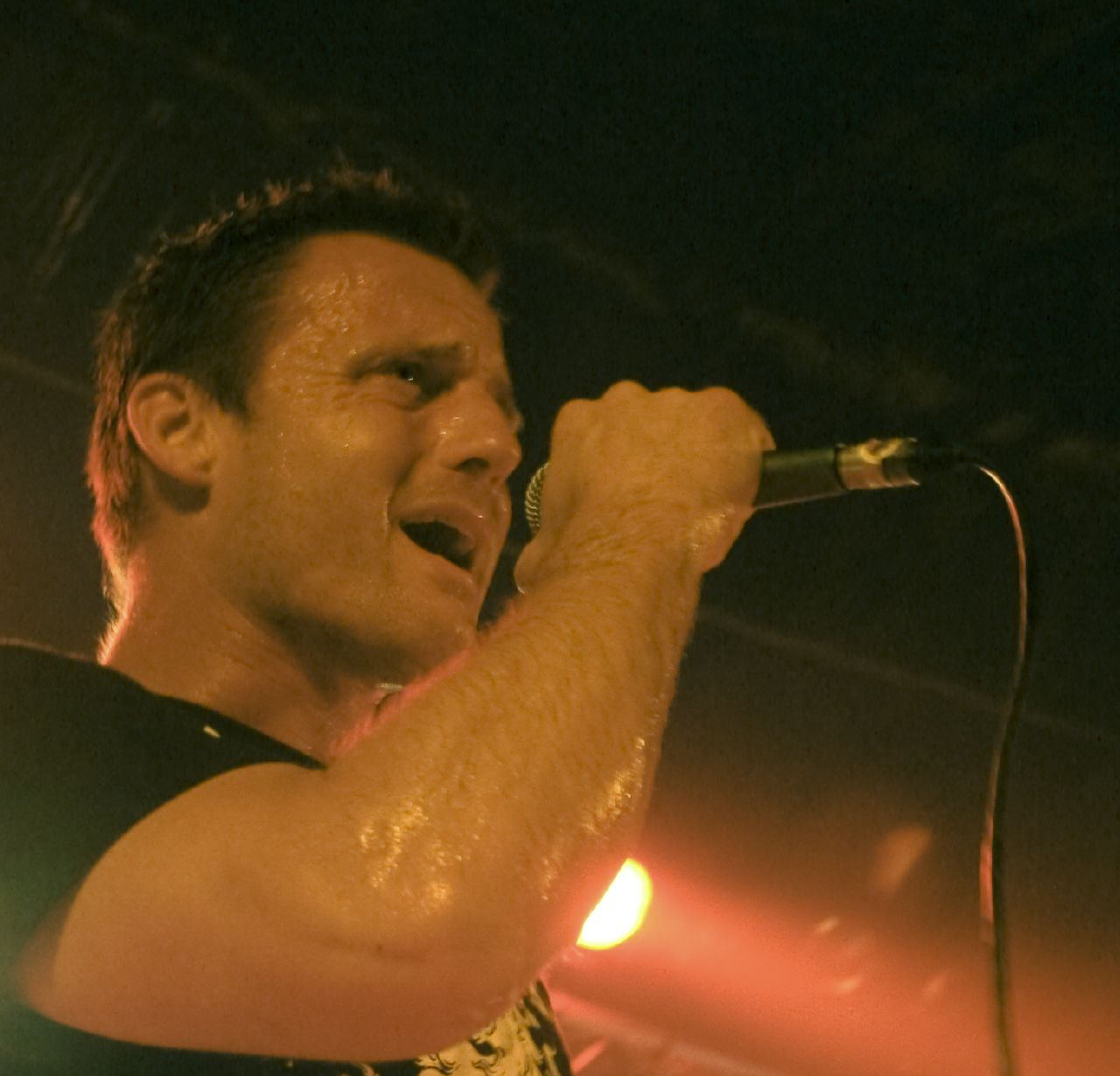
Teglas in 2008

=== Ignite ===
Studio albums

- Scarred for Life (1994)
- Family (1995)
- A Place Called Home (2000)
- Our Darkest Days (2006)
- A War Against You (2016)
- Ignite (2022)

Other releases

- Where They Talk EP (1994)
- Slapshot / Ignite split (1994)
- Battery / Ignite split (1994)
- In My Time EP (1995)
- Ignite / Good Riddance split (1996)
- Past Our Means EP (1996)
- Straight Ahead (1997)
- Ignite / X-Acto split (1997)
- Sea Shepherd Conservation Society EP (1999)

=== Pennywise ===
- All or Nothing (2012)

=== Zoli Band ===
- Zoli Band (2000)
- ... Live at the M.O.D. (2001)
- Red & Blue (2010)
- Santa Monica (2019)

== Filmography ==
=== Film ===
Year	Work	Role	Note
2002	Schusterman Levine: A Boxing Fable	Tony Tony	
2015	Argo 2	Jackson	
2016	Spectral	Tank Commander	Cameo
2019	Terminator: Dark Fate	US Border Desk Sergeant (as Zoltán Téglás)	

=== Television ===
Year	Work	Role	Note
2015-2016	Tyrant	Intelligence Officer	Two episodes
