= Our Darkest Days =

Studio album by Ignite
- Released: May 16, 2006
- Recorded: November 2005 – January 2006
- Studios: Maple Sound, Santa Ana, California; Paramount, Hollywood, California
- Genre: Melodic hardcore
- Length: 35:56
- Label: Abacus Recordings
- Producer: Cameron Webb

Ignite chronology
A Place Called Home (2000)	Our Darkest Days (2006)	A War Against You (2016)

Our Darkest Days is the fourth studio album by American punk rock band Ignite. It was released on May 16, 2006 through Abacus Recordings. Following the release of their third studio album A Place Called Home (2000), the band left their label, went through line-up changes, and the members focused their time on the side project California United. Despite starting pre-production for a new album in early 2005, they did not start recording until November 2005, and eventually finishing in January 2006. Sessions were held at Maple Sound Studios in Santa Ana, California, and Paramount Studios, Hollywood, California with producer Cameron Webb. The album's melodic hardcore sound evokes the music of 7 Seconds and AFI (specifically their 1999 album Black Sails in the Sunset).

Our Darkest Days received generally favorable reviews from music critics, some of whom praised the song writing and frontman Zoli Téglás' vocals. After recording finished, Ignite toured the US between February and April 2006 with Comeback Kid and First Blood. Following the album's release, Ignite trekked across Europe with With Honor, supported Strike Anywhere on their US tour, and ended the year supporting Pennywise on their Canadian tour. In early 2007, they appeared in South America and would play various festivals across Europe over the next several months, such as Reading and Leeds. They embarked on a European tour in April and May 2008, with a trek of Australia following in July 2008.

== Background and recording ==
Ignite released their third studio album A Place Called Home in June 2000 through TVT Records. By April 2001, the band had left the label, citing a lack of European distribution for the album. In March 2002, the band announced that they had signed with Vans Records, a label started by Jim Lindberg of Pennywise. Guitarist Brian Balchack was replaced by Kevin Kilkenny for touring, until the latter decided to focus on being a motorcyclist. Frontman Zoli Téglás and bassist Brett Rasmussen spent time in 2003 with their side project California United, with the Lonely Kings drummer Jon Barrysmith and Jet Lag guitarist Nik Hill. In June 2004, Ignite played their first shows in the United States for two years, prior to a tour of Europe. Balchack re-joined the band to aid in writing new material. In August 2004, it was reported that the band had eight new songs for their next album, and planned to write up to another ten for it. Between September and November 2004, they toured across Europe, Brazil and Australia.

In January 2005, the band said they were in the process of pre-production, looking for a new label for their next release, and posted "Bleeding" on their Myspace profile. In June 2005, they went on a brief West Coast tour with H_{2}O. On July 20, 2005, the band signed to Abacus Recordings, and expected to release their next album in early 2006. The following month, they embarked on another of Europe. Ignite recorded a new album between November 2005 and January 2006. Sessions were held at Maple Sound Studios in Santa Ana, California, and Paramount Studios in Hollywood, California, with producer and engineer Cameron Webb. Sergo Chavez and Paul Miner did additional engineering. Partway through recording, Téglás was involved in a theatre adaption of Quadrophenia. Webb mixed the recordings at Maple Sound Studios, before the album was mastered by Kevin Bartley at Capitol Studios in Hollywood.

== Composition and lyrics ==
Musically, Our Darkest Days has been described as melodic hardcore, drawing comparison to the work of 7 Seconds and Black Sails in the Sunset-era (1999) AFI. Téglás switched his typical shout-y vocals for more melodic singing, which were compared to the Scorpions frontman Klaus Meine, Tool's Maynard James Keenan, and the Offspring vocalist Dexter Holland. Alongside the other members of Ignite, Brandan Schieppati of Bleeding Through and Pat Kilkenny contributed background vocals. It contained the band's most personal writing up to this point, as well as tackling the toic of the war in Iraq; the name alludes to the George W. Bush administration. The opening track "Intro (Our Darkest Days)" lasts for a minute, before segueing into "Bleeding", which Rasmussen said deals with the "lies our Government told us to get us into a war without taking the rest of the world's consideration into it". With the mid-tempo "Fear Is Out Tradition", Téglás discusses the US media "ensur[ing] that a large proportion of [Bush's] compatriots live in a constant fear of the rest of the world". "Let It Burn" is about a friend's girlfriend who was pregnant and died because of a drunk driver. The Bad Religion-lite "Poverty for All" is about the situation between Hungary and the USSR, where the Hungarians were oppressed and suffered from poverty as a result of intervention from the USSR.

"My Judgement Day" tackles working with popular artists such as the Misfits and Motörhead (who also recorded with Webb). "Save Yourself" is about alcohol addiction; Téglás would frequently have parts and drink alcohol while on tour. "Three Years" details the long gap between the release of A Place Called Home and Our Darkest Days, while "Know Your History" explains the band's issues with their past labels. The latter track, which featured lead guitar from Alex Grossi, evoked the material of the band's earlier, Revelation Records-released albums. "Strength" deals with how the band's line-up has constantly changed since the end of the 1990s. A cover of U2's "Sunday Bloody Sunday" (1983) was intended for release on A Place Called Home, though was vetoed by TVT Records. It appeared on the later European edition of the album; Ignite decided to include it on Our Darkest Days as they knew the album would have a worldwide release. "Live for Better Days" is an acoustic track, which Téglás said was influenced by the work of Coldplay. A short hidden track follows, featuring Téglás singing about his home country of Hungary in his native language.

== Release and promotion ==
On February 25, 2006, Our Darkest Days' was announced for release in three months' time. In February and March 2006, the band toured the US with Comeback Kid, First Blood, and Sinking Ships. The trek was extended into April 2006, with This Is Hell replacing Sinking Ships. Two-song promotional CD samplers were given out during the tour to help promote the upcoming album. On March 13, 2006, "My Judgement Day" was posted on their Myspace. Our Darkest Days was made available for streaming on May 8, 2006 through the website Decoy Music, before being released eight days later through Abacus Recordings; the vinyl edition was released by Think Fast Records. The artwork is a photo of the St. Peter Harbor, which Téglás lived minutes from. The majority of the goods originate from China; a military base is located eastwards of the port and is armed nuclear missiles aimed at the country. The cover is intended to show this paradox in US politics. An idea for a music video centred around the band building a house for family was planned. It was scrapped when Bon Jovi did the concept first.

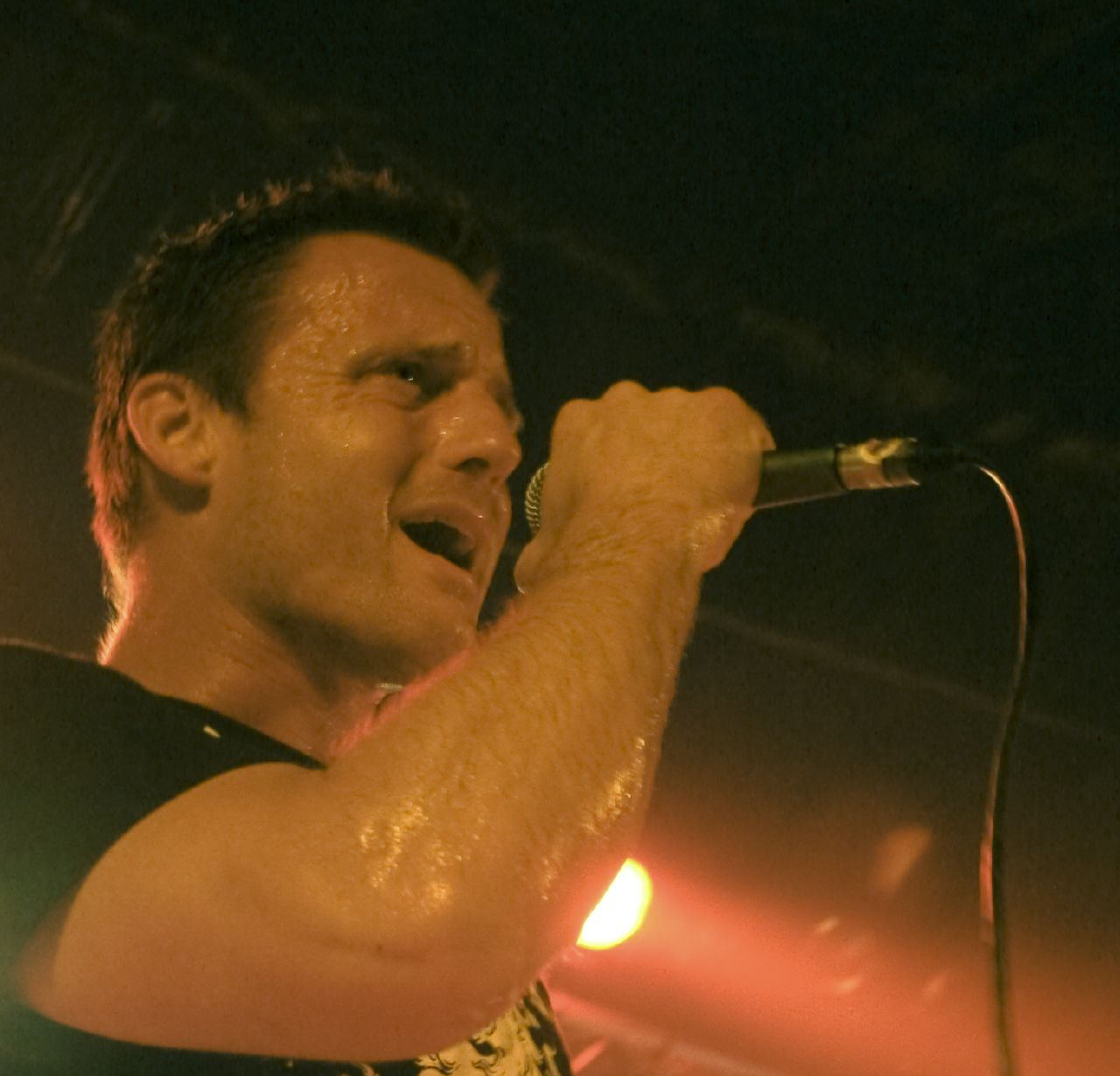
Teglas on stage; Ignite toured throughout 2006, 2007 and 2008 in support of Our Darkest Days.

Our Darkest Days was promoted with a headlining US tour, with support from Blacklisted and Set Your Goals; Ignite then appeared at Hood Fest 4. Blacklisted dropped off the trek when their guitarist became ill. In June and July 2006, they toured across Europe with With Honor; the trek included an appearance at Hellfest. On July 12, 2006, the music video for "Bleeding" was posted online, which had been directed by Christopher Sims. Following this, the band took a month-long break, supported Strike Anywhere on their US tour, and played stints in South Africa and Japan. In October 2006, they supported Pennywise on their headlining tour of Canada. In January 2007, Ignite toured across South America, which led into a set of Californian shows with Pennywise and Circle Jerks. A European trek was planned for February and March 2007, but was cancelled because of Téglás suffering from health issues.

Ignite eventually performed in Europe as part of the Groezrock festival in Belgium in April 2007. Following a few West Coast shows, the band played various European festivals in August and September 2007, including Pukkelpop, Resurrection, and Reading and Leeds. A tour edition of the album was released by Century Media; it include new song "Last Time", a demo of "Bleeding", and the music video for "Bleeding". On August 14, 2007, a music video for "My Judgement Day" was posted online. In April 2008, the band embarked on a club tour of Europe alongside Terror, Strung Out, Death Before Dishonor, and Burnthe8track. The gig in Leipzig, Germany was filmed for a potential video album. A second leg continued into May 2008 with Death Before Dishonor and Burnthe8track. In July 2008, the band went on a short tour of Australia; they ended the year with an appearance at LiskFest in California.

== Critical reception ==
Professional ratings
Review scores
Source	Rating
AllMusic	3.5/5 stars
Blabbermouth.net	7.5/10
Metal.de	9/10
Ox-Fanzine	8/10
Punknews.org	4.5/5 stars
Rock Hard	9/10

Our Darkest Days was met with generally favourable reviews from music critics. AllMusic reviewer Greg Prato said Ignite where difficult to attach a genre to, and "[a]ny band that refuses to be pigeonholed in the early 21st century should be commended". He added that it "may have taken for what seemed like forever to get their fourth long-player released, but Our Darkest Days is sure to not let down fans" of the band's past works. Blabbermouth.net writer Scott Alisoglu was impressed that the band could come up with material that was "unequivocally heavy, yet competently arranged, and that are infectious without sounding stereotypically emo or cheesy". He praised Balchack and Hill for offering "life to the tunes without sacrificing aggression". Ox-Fanzine's Tobias Ernst complimented the band's "very mature" sound, adding that it was "nice that the guys still have so much to say" lyrically.

Punknews.org founder Aubin Paul highlighted Téglás' vocal range and the band's technical prowess, adding: "With Our Darkest Days, Ignite has ended a nearly six-year absence from recording, and has delivered a record worthy of the wait". Buffo Schnadelbach of Rock Hard said praised Téglás' "passionate singing", which was backed by the "greatest melodies, riffs and hooks" provided by the rest of the band members. Exclaim! writer Sam Sutherland saw it as "one hell of an album" that was "frustratingly catchy and inspiring thanks to its resoluteness in turning bad experiences into positive lessons". Chad Bowar for Lollipop Magazine expressed a similar sentiment, stating that "even though the lyrics cover serious topics, the songs are very melodic, with great hooks and memorable choruses".

Punknews.org ranked the album at number nine on their list of the year's 20 best releases.

== Track listing ==
All songs written by Ignite, except "Sunday Bloody Sunday" by U2.

1. "Intro (Our Darkest Days)" – 0:51
2. "Bleeding" – 2:02
3. "Fear Is Our Tradition" – 3:06
4. "Let It Burn" – 2:51
5. "Poverty for All" – 2:13
6. "My Judgement Day" – 2:25
7. "Slowdown" – 3:05
8. "Save Yourself" – 2:30
9. "Are You Listening" – 1:22
10. "Three Years" – 2:39
11. "Know Your History" – 2:13
12. "Strength" – 1:43
13. "Sunday Bloody Sunday" (U2 cover) – 3:41
14. "Live for Better Days" (includes hidden track) – 5:15

== Personnel ==
Personnel per booklet.

Ignite

- Zoli Téglás – vocals
- Brett Rasmussen – bass, background vocals
- Brian Balchack – guitar, background vocals
- Nik Hill – guitar, background vocals
- Craig Anderson – drums, background vocals

Additional musicians

- Brandan Schieppati – background vocals
- Pat Kilkenny – background vocals
- Alex Grossi – lead guitar (track 11)

Production and design

- Cameron Webb – producer, engineer, mixing
- Sergo Chavez – additional engineering
- Paul Miner – additional engineering
- Kevin Bartley – mastering
- Brian Balchack – design, layout
- Joe Suitor – design, layout
- Sean Rosenthal – photography
