= Sunday Bloody Sunday =

1983 song by U2

- European sleeve for one of the 7-inch releases

Single by U2

from the album War
- Released: 21 March 1983
- Recorded: September–November 1982
- Studio: Windmill Lane (Dublin)
- Genre: Rock; post-punk
- Length: 4:40
- Label: Island; Polystar
- Songwriter: U2
- Producer: Steve Lillywhite

U2 singles chronology
"Two Hearts Beat as One" (1983)	"Sunday Bloody Sunday" (1983)	"40" (1983)

Music video
- "Sunday Bloody Sunday" on YouTube

"Sunday Bloody Sunday" is a song by Irish rock band U2. It is the opening track from their 1983 album War and was released as the album's third single on 21 March 1983 in the Netherlands and West Germany. "Sunday Bloody Sunday" is noted for its military drumbeat, harsh guitar, and melodic harmonies. One of U2's most overtly political songs, its lyrics describe the horror felt by an observer of the Troubles in Northern Ireland, mainly focusing on the 1972 Bloody Sunday incident in Derry where British troops shot and killed 14 unarmed civil rights protesters. Along with "New Year's Day", the song helped U2 reach a wider listening audience. It was generally well received by critics on the album's release.

The song has remained a staple of U2's live concerts. During its earliest performances, the song created controversy. Lead singer Bono reasserted the song's anti-sectarian-violence message to his audience for many years. Today, it is considered one of U2's signature songs, and is one of the band's most performed tracks. Critics rate it among the best political protest songs, and it has been covered by over a dozen artists. In 2004, it was ranked 268th on Rolling Stone's list of "The 500 Greatest Songs of All Time".

== Writing and recording ==
"Sunday Bloody Sunday" grew from a guitar riff and lyric written by the Edge in 1982. While newlyweds Bono and Ali Hewson honeymooned in Jamaica, the Edge worked in Ireland on music for the band's upcoming album. Following an argument with his girlfriend Aislinn O'Sullivan, and a period of doubt in his own song-writing abilities, the Edge—"feeling depressed... channelled [his] fear and frustration and self-loathing into a piece of music." This early draft did not yet have a title or chorus melody, but did contain a structural outline and theme. After Bono had reworked the lyrics, the band recorded the song at Windmill Lane Studios in Dublin. During the sessions, producer Steve Lillywhite encouraged drummer Larry Mullen Jr. to use a click track, but Mullen was firmly against the idea. A chance meeting with Andy Newmark of Sly & the Family Stone – a drummer who used a click track religiously – changed Mullen's mind. The opening drum pattern soon developed into the song's hook. A local violinist, Steve Wickham, approached the Edge one morning at a bus stop and asked if U2 had any need for a violin on their next album. Wickham spent half a day in the studio recording an electric violin track that became the final instrumental contribution to the song.

The direct impetus for the lyrics was an encounter with Provisional IRA supporters in New York City. As a promotional gimmick, U2 manager Paul McGuinness had made arrangements for the band to appear in the 1982 St. Patrick's Day parade. However, he later found that there was a possibility that Bobby Sands, an IRA hunger striker who had starved to death the previous year, would be the parade's honorary marshal. As they felt that the IRA's tactics were prolonging the fighting in Northern Ireland, McGuinness and the band members mutually decided they should withdraw from the parade. McGuinness met with one of the parade's organizers in a New York bar to arrange the cancellation, and ended up in a heated debate about the IRA. McGuinness recalled, "He kept telling me to keep my voice down. The place was full of New York policemen – Irish cops – and he thought I was going to get us killed."

Drummer Mullen said of the song in 1983:

We're into the politics of people, we're not into politics. Like you talk about Northern Ireland, 'Sunday Bloody Sunday,' people sort of think, 'Oh, that time when 13 Catholics were shot by British soldiers'; that's not what the song is about. That's an incident, the most famous incident in Northern Ireland and it's the strongest way of saying, 'How long? How long do we have to put up with this?' I don't care who's who – Catholics, Protestants, whatever. You know people are dying every single day through bitterness and hate, and we're saying why? What's the point? And you can move that into places like El Salvador and other similar situations – people dying. Let's forget the politics, let's stop shooting each other and sit around the table and talk about it... There are a lot of bands taking sides saying politics is crap, etc. Well, so what! The real battle is people dying, that's the real battle.

== Composition ==
"Sunday Bloody Sunday" sample
The song's opening 28 seconds feature the martial drumbeat, raw guitar, and bleak lyrics.

"Sunday Bloody Sunday" is played at a tempo of 103 beats per minute in a 4/4 time signature. The song opens with a martial drumbeat and electric violin part; the aggressive snare drum rhythm closely resembles a beat used to keep a military band in step. The distinctive drum sound was achieved by recording Mullen's drumwork at the base of a staircase, producing a more natural reverb. It is followed by the Edge's repeating arpeggios. The riff, which follows a B♭m–D♭–G♭^{6} chord progression, establishes the minor chord territory of the piece. As the song progresses, the lyrics and guitar become more furious. The guitar riff has been described as the "bone-crushing arena-rock riff of the decade" by Rolling Stone. A bass drum kick on every beat provides the musical foundation until the first chorus, when Adam Clayton's bass guitar enters.

In contrast to the violent nature of the verses, the emergence of major chords creates a feeling of hope during Bono's "How long, how long must we sing this song?" refrain. During the chorus, the Edge's backing vocals further develop this tread, using a harmonic imitative echo. The snare drum is absent from this section, and the guitar parts are muted. This part of the song deviates musically from the raw aggression seen in the song's verses and gives the song a more uplifting structure. Bono once commented that "love is... a central theme" of "Sunday Bloody Sunday"

The band have said the lyrics refer to the events of both Bloody Sunday in 1972 and Bloody Sunday in 1920, but are not specifically about either event. The song takes the standpoint of someone horrified by the cycle of violence in the province. Bono rewrote the Edge's initial lyrics, attempting to contrast the two events with Easter Sunday, but he has said that the band were too inexperienced at the time to fully realise that goal, noting that "it was a song whose eloquence lay in its harmonic power rather than its verbal strength."

Early versions opened with the line "Don't talk to me about the rights of the IRA, UDA." Clayton, recalls that better judgment led to the removal of such a politically charged line, and that the song's "viewpoint became very humane and non-sectarian... which, is the only responsible position." The chosen opening line, "I can't believe the news today" crystallises the prevailing response, especially among young people, to the violence in Northern Ireland during the 1970s and 1980s. In successive stanzas, the lyrics paraphrase religious texts from Matthew 10:35 ("mother's children; brothers, sisters torn apart"), Revelation 21:4 ("wipe your tears away"), and bring a twist to 1 Corinthians 15:32 ("we eat and drink while tomorrow they die", instead of "let us eat and drink; for tomorrow we die"). The song finishes with a call for an end to the fighting, and to "claim the victory Jesus won... on [a] Sunday bloody Sunday."

== Music video ==
Although a promotional music video had not been produced for the original release, the band used footage from a 5 June 1983 live performance filmed for the 1984 concert film U2 Live at Red Rocks: Under a Blood Red Sky to promote the song. Directed by Gavin Taylor, the video displays Bono's use of a white flag during performances of the song. The video highlights the intensity and emotion felt by many audience members during U2's concerts, while the rainy, torch-lit setting in Colorado's Red Rocks Amphitheatre further adds to the atmosphere. In 2004, Rolling Stone cited the performance as one "50 Moments that Changed the History of Rock and Roll" and noted that "the sight of Bono singing the anti-violence anthem 'Sunday Bloody Sunday' while waving a white flag through crimson mist (created by a combination of wet weather, hot lights and the illumination of those crags) became the defining image of U2's warrior-rock spirit and—shown in heavy rotation on MTV—broke the band nationwide."

== Reception ==
U2 were aware when they decided to record "Sunday Bloody Sunday" that its lyrics could be misinterpreted as sectarian, and possibly place them in danger. Some of the Edge's original lyrics explicitly spoke out against violent rebels, but they were omitted to protect the group. Even without these lyrics, some listeners still considered it to be a rebel song—even one which glorifies the events of the two Bloody Sundays to which the lyrics refer.

Commercially, the single had its biggest impact in the Netherlands, where it reached number 3 on the national charts. In the United States, the song gained significant album-oriented rock radio airplay, and together with the earlier "New Year's Day" helped expose U2 to a mainstream American rock audience.

Contemporaneously, critical reception to the song was positive. In the Irish magazine Hot Press, Liam Mackey wrote that "Sunday Bloody Sunday" "takes the widescreen view...a powerful riff and machine-gun drumming [is] crisscrossed by skipping violin." Denise Sullivan commented for AllMusic that Mullen's opening drumwork "helps set the tone for the unforgiving, take-no-prisoners feel of the song, as well as for the rest of the album."

== Live performances ==
"Sunday Bloody Sunday" has been performed more than 600 times by U2. It was first heard by a live audience in December 1982 in Glasgow, Scotland, on a twenty-one show "Pre-War Tour". The band were particularly nervous about playing the song in Belfast, Northern Ireland. Introducing the song there at the Maysfield Leisure Centre, Bono stated, "It's not a rebel song", and attempted to further clarify this point by reciting the entire second verse ("Broken bottles under children's feet ..."), and added as a final note, "If you don't like it, you let us know." The crowd overwhelmingly enjoyed the song; the Edge recalls that "the place went nuts, it drew a really positive reaction", also saying: "We thought a lot about the song before we played it in Belfast and Bono told the audience that if they didn't like it then we'd never play it again. Out of the 3,000 people in the hall about three walked out. I think that says a lot about the audience's trust in us." The band remained apprehensive, however. Even by the song's sixth performance, Bono was introducing the song with the statement, "This song is not a rebel song."

Throughout 1983's War Tour, Bono continued to reassure audiences that "This song is not a rebel song, this song is 'Sunday Bloody Sunday'" highlighting the non-partisan intentions of the lyrics. The live performances on this tour featured a routine during which Bono would set a white flag in the front of the stage while the band vamped three chords—B minor, D major, and G major (though the band traditionally tune their instruments down a half step so the chords are B flat minor, D flat and G flat). As the band vamped, Bono would sing "no more!" with the audience. These performances were highly effective with U2's audience (at the time, U2 were most popular as a college rock act). Live performances of the song subsequently appeared on their 1983 live album Under a Blood Red Sky and their concert film Live at Red Rocks: Under a Blood Red Sky. In the Unforgettable Fire Tour of 1984 and 1985, "Sunday Bloody Sunday" continued to be a prominent midpoint of each U2 concert—as did the "no more!" interlude. Along with a performance of "Bad", the song was performed at Live Aid in July 1985.

As U2 reached new levels of fame in 1987 with The Joshua Tree, "Sunday Bloody Sunday" continued to be a focal point of concerts. Some performances featured slower, more contemplative versions of the song; other concerts saw the wilder, more violent version. This tour marked the first time "Sunday Bloody Sunday" was played in Northern Ireland since 1982, and it was not performed in Northern Ireland again until the 2015 Innocence + Experience Tour.

The 1988 rockumentary Rattle and Hum includes a particularly renowned version of the song, recorded on 8 November 1987 at McNichols Sports Arena in Denver. On this version Bono's mid-song rant angrily and emphatically condemns the Remembrance Day bombing that had occurred earlier that same day in the Northern Irish town of Enniskillen:

And let me tell you somethin'. I've had enough of Irish Americans who haven't been back to their country in twenty or thirty years come up to me and talk about the resistance, the revolution back home...and the glory of the revolution...and the glory of dying for the revolution. Fuck the revolution! They don't talk about the glory of killing for the revolution. What's the glory in taking a man from his bed and gunning him down in front of his wife and his children? Where's the glory in that? Where's the glory in bombing a Remembrance Day parade of old-age pensioners, their medals taken out and polished up for the day? Where's the glory in that? To leave them dying or crippled for life or dead under the rubble of a revolution that the majority of the people in my country don't want. No more!

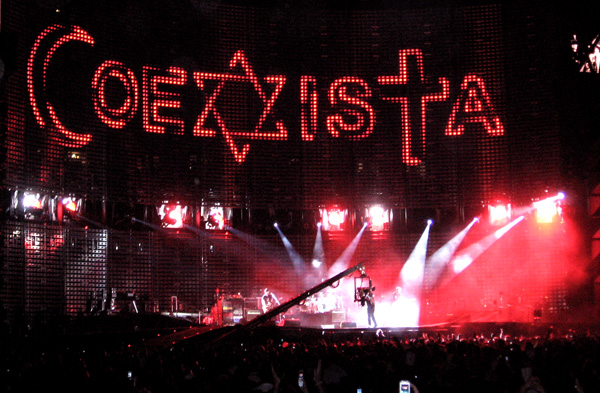
This concert in Mexico City in February 2006 depicts the video imagery used for "Sunday Bloody Sunday".

After The Joshua Tree Tour in 1987, Bono was heard saying the band might never play the song again, because the song was "made real" with the performance in Denver, and it could never be matched again. Following their original intent, "Sunday Bloody Sunday" was not played during any of the 47 shows on the Lovetown Tour in 1989. The song reappeared for a brief period during the 1992-1993 Zoo TV Tour, and late during the second half of PopMart Tour (1997–1998), U2 played an emotional concert in war-ravaged Sarajevo that included a solo performance of the song by the Edge. "Sunday Bloody Sunday" was subsequently played live in this style until the end of the tour in March 1998.

"Sunday Bloody Sunday" was played at every concert on the 2001 Elevation Tour and 2005–2006 Vertigo Tour. Performances in 2001 frequently included parts of Bob Marley and the Wailers' "Get Up, Stand Up" and "Johnny Was". A memorable mid-song message referencing the Omagh bombing of 1998 ("Turn this song into a prayer. [...] No UDA. No IRA. We're not going back there.") is captured on the 2003 live DVD U2 Go Home: Live from Slane Castle, Ireland. In concerts in New York City after the September 11, 2001 attacks, the "no more!" interlude was replaced by Bono holding an American flag.

"Sunday Bloody Sunday" was used during the Vertigo Tour of 2005 and 2006, often alongside "Bullet the Blue Sky" and "Love and Peace or Else" as a trio of politically driven songs performed during the middle part of the band's set. Bono extended the "no more!" interlude to explain a headband he had donned in the previous song. The headband depicted the word "coexist" (written to depict a crescent, a Star of David, and a Christian cross). The Coexist symbol is trademarked in the United States by an LLP in Indiana, and the original artwork was created in 2001 by a Polish artist. As with the 2001 shows, the Vertigo tour saw the song applied to subjects further afield than The Troubles in Northern Ireland. During 2006 Australian shows, in Brisbane, Bono asked for Australian suspect of terrorism David Hicks to be brought home and tried under Australian laws. In subsequent Australian concerts he dedicated the song to the victims of the 2002 Bali bombings – where 88 of the fatalities were Australians – saying 'This is your song now!'. The song was also performed at every concert on the 2009-2011 U2 360° Tour, paying tribute to the 2009 Iranian election protests on each occasion by projecting scenes from the protests and Persian writing in green on the video screen.

"Sunday Bloody Sunday" was played as the opening song at shows on The Joshua Tree Tours 2017 and 2019.

== Legacy ==
In 2004, Rolling Stone placed the song at number 268 on its list of "The 500 Greatest Songs of All Time"; the song was re-ranked to 272nd on the magazine's 2010 version of the list. In 2006, Q named "Sunday Bloody Sunday" the 18th-greatest song of the 1980s. The staff of the Rock and Roll Hall of Fame selected "Sunday Bloody Sunday" as one of 500 Songs that Shaped Rock and Roll. The New Statesman listed it as one of the Top 20 Political Songs, and similarly, Time named it one of the Top 10 Protest Songs.

In 2019, Rolling Stone ranked the song number four on their list of the 50 greatest U2 songs, and in 2020, The Guardian ranked the song number five on their list of the 40 greatest U2 songs.

== Other releases ==
The album version of "Sunday Bloody Sunday" was originally included on War (1983), but it can also be heard on a number of promotional releases, including the compilations The Best of 1980–1990 (1998) and U218 Singles (2006). Several live versions have been released; the video available on Live at Red Rocks: Under a Blood Red Sky is from a performance at Red Rocks Amphitheatre in June 1983, but the version on the live album Under a Blood Red Sky is from a performance on 20 August 1983 during the Rockpalast Open Air music festival at the Lorelei, (West) Germany. Audio from the Sarajevo concert of 1997 is featured as a b-side on 1997's single "If God Will Send His Angels." The song also appears on Rattle and Hum, PopMart: Live from Mexico City (1998), Elevation 2001: Live from Boston, U2 Go Home: Live from Slane Castle, Ireland (2003), Vertigo 2005: Live from Chicago, Live from Paris (2007), U2 3D (2008), U2360° at the Rose Bowl (2010) and in the closing credits of the 2002 TV film Bloody Sunday. The only concert films that "Sunday Bloody Sunday" does not appear on are Zoo TV: Live from Sydney (1994) and Vertigo 05: Live from Milan. Additionally, "Sunday Bloody Sunday" was one of the forty songs chosen and re-recorded for U2's 2023 album Songs of Surrender. Bono rewrote the lyrics for the last two verses of the song.

== In popular culture ==
In 1997, a scheduled U2 concert at Montreal's Olympic Stadium conflicted with an unexpected home playoff game between the Canadian Football League's Montreal Alouettes and British Columbia Lions. As a result, the team opted to move the game to Percival Molson Stadium at McGill University. The Alouettes struggled with attendance issues at Olympic Stadium upon returning in 1996 and were on the verge of contraction. When the team announced they were playing the game at McGill, interest in the team soared and the game sold out. The success prompted the team to relocate permanently to the smaller venue the following season. In honour of the unintended role the band played in saving the franchise, the Alouettes play the song prior to every Sunday home game.

In 2000, Ignite covered the song on their album A Place Called Home.

In 2007, The Roots covered "Sunday Bloody Sunday" in a medley with "Pride (In the Name of Love)" for an NAACP dinner honouring Bono. While the band played the song, Black Thought rapped lines from the band's own "False Media" and bits of Edwin Starr's "War".

Also in 2007, Paramore covered the song for the B-side of its single "Misery Business" while Saul Williams covered the song on his album The Inevitable Rise and Liberation of NiggyTardust!

In 2008, Jay-Z sampled "Sunday Bloody Sunday" in a version of "Heart of the City (Ain't No Love)" performed at the Glastonbury Festival. During a version of "Sunday Bloody Sunday" performed by the band at the 2009 MTV Europe Music Awards, Jay-Z joined them and improvised lyrics over the breakdown in the song before including a snippet of "Get Up, Stand Up."

In 2010, the song was used in the sixth episode of the third and final series of the British fantasy crime drama and police procedural drama television series Ashes to Ashes during a prison riot scene.

== Formats and track listings ==
"Sunday Bloody Sunday" was commercially released throughout most of Europe in support of U2's album War. Its cover art is the same as that of "Two Hearts Beat as One", except on the Japan release. The B-side on the single, "Endless Deep", is one of the few U2 songs that features bassist Adam Clayton singing.

7" German and Netherlands release
No.	Title	Length
1.	"Sunday Bloody Sunday"	4:34
2.	"Endless Deep"	2:58

7" alternate release
No.	Title	Length
1.	"Sunday Bloody Sunday"	4:34
2.	"Two Hearts Beat as One" (7" edit)	3:52

7" Japanese release
No.	Title	Length
1.	"Sunday Bloody Sunday"	4:34
2.	"Red Light"	4:03

12" and Austrian CD release
No.	Title	Length
1.	"Sunday Bloody Sunday"	4:34
2.	"Two Hearts Beat as One" (U.S. remix)	5:40
3.	"New Year's Day" (U.S. remix)	4:30

== Personnel ==
- Bono – lead vocals
- The Edge – guitar, backing vocals
- Adam Clayton – bass guitar
- Larry Mullen Jr. – drums
- Steve Wickham – electric violin

== Charts ==
=== Weekly charts ===
Chart (1983)	Peak position
US Billboard Top Tracks	7

Chart (1985)	Peak position
Belgium (Ultratop 50 Flanders)	11
Netherlands (Dutch Top 40)	3
Netherlands (Single Top 100)	3

Chart (2010)	Peak position
Belgium (Ultratop 50 Back Catalogue Singles Flanders)	5

Chart (2016)	Peak position
France (SNEP)	95

=== Year-end charts ===
Chart (1985)	Position
Belgium (Ultratop Flanders)	97
Netherlands (Dutch Top 40)	39
Netherlands (Single Top 100)	32

== Certifications and sales ==
Region	Certification	Certified units/sales
Italy (FIMI) sales since 2009	Platinum	100,000^{‡}
Netherlands (NVPI)	Gold	100,000^{^}
United Kingdom (BPI) sales since 2004	Silver	200,000^{‡}
^{^} Shipments figures based on certification alone.^{‡} Sales+streaming figures based on certification alone.

== See also ==
- List of anti-war songs
- List of covers of U2 songs – Sunday Bloody Sunday
