= Scarred for Life =

Scarred for Life may refer to:

- Scarred for Life (Rose Tattoo album)
- Scarred for Life (Ignite album)
- "Scarred for Life", a song by Slapp Happy from their album, Ça Va
- "Waheedajaan: Scarred for Life", an episode of the 2024 Indian TV series Heeramandi
