= A Place Called Home =

A Place Called Home may refer to:

- A Place Called Home (album), a 2000 album by Ignite
- "A Place Called Home", a song by PJ Harvey from the 2000 album Stories from the City, Stories from the Sea
- "A Place Called Home", a song by Kim Richey from the 2002 album Rise
- A Place Called Home (film), a 2004 television film starring Ann-Margret, Matthew Settle, and Gary Sandy
