= Two Hearts Beat as One =

- Standard artwork (pictured variant used for most 7-inch releases)

Single by U2

from the album War
- B-side: "Endless Deep"
- Released: 21 March 1983
- Recorded: September–November 1982
- Studio: Windmill Lane (Dublin)
- Genre: Post-punk; funk-punk
- Length: 3:52
- Label: CBS Ireland; Island; Festival; Polystar
- Songwriter: U2
- Producer: Steve Lillywhite

U2 singles chronology
"New Year's Day" (1983)	"Two Hearts Beat as One" (1983)	"Sunday Bloody Sunday" (1983)

Music video
- "Two Hearts Beat as One" on YouTube

"Two Hearts Beat as One" is a song by Irish rock band U2. It is the seventh track on their 1983 album, War, and was released as its second single in the United States, United Kingdom, and Australia on 21 March 1983.

== History ==
The music video was directed by Meiert Avis and was filmed outside the Basilica of Sacré Coeur de Montmartre in Paris in March 1983. It portrays the band performing the song, intercut with scenes of an acrobat and other scenes featuring Peter Rowen (the boy who appears on the album cover). The Parisian church is dedicated to the Sacred Heart of Jesus. Unlike the other videos from the album, it has never been included on any of the band's video compilations.

"Two Hearts Beat as One" was released as the album's second single in the US, UK and Australia, as opposed to "Sunday Bloody Sunday", which was released only in the mainland of Europe. Both singles were released in Japan.

It features a bassline by Adam Clayton which is played at the beginning of the song.

The isolated bassline is the main rhythm on Martin Solveig's 2003 Exotic Disco mix of "Madan", a song originally by Salif Keita.

"Two Hearts Beat as One" was one of forty songs chosen by the Edge and re-recorded by the band for the 2023 album Songs of Surrender.

== Reception ==
Cash Box praised the intensity produced by the "pounding bass figures, snap drumming and Bono’s voice."

=== Live performances ===
The song was first played in concert on 26 February 1983, at the first show of the War Tour and was played at almost all concerts on that tour. On the second leg of the War Tour, "Two Hearts Beat as One" began to follow "Surrender" and the two songs segued together. This transition survived to the Unforgettable Fire Tour. However, on the third leg of the Unforgettable Fire Tour, "Two Hearts Beat as One" was separated from "Surrender" and it was played less frequently. Its last tour appearance on 29 April 1985, in Atlanta. It made a further subsequent appearance when it was performed as part of the encore at a Lovetown Tour concert on 27 December 1989, in the Point Depot, Dublin. The song was not played live again for 25 years until a New York concert during the Innocence + Experience Tour of 2015. It was also performed at their Sphere residence U2:UV Achtung Baby Live in 2023.

A live performance of the song at Red Rocks Amphitheatre appears on the DVD release of the concert film Live at Red Rocks: Under a Blood Red Sky.

== Formats and track listings ==
7" release
No.	Title	Length
1.	"Two Hearts Beat as One" (7" edit)	3:52
2.	"Endless Deep"	2:58

12" release
No.	Title	Length
1.	"Two Hearts Beat as One" (Club version)	5:40
2.	"New Year's Day" (U.S. remix)	4:30
3.	"Two Hearts Beat as One" (U.S. remix)	4:23

7" UK and Ireland release
No.	Title	Length
1.	"Two Hearts Beat as One" (7" edit)	3:52
2.	"Endless Deep"	2:58
3.	"New Year's Day" (U.S. remix)	4:30
4.	"Two Hearts Beat as One" (U.S. Remix)	5:40

7" French release
No.	Title	Length
1.	"Two Hearts Beat as One" (Album version)	4:02
2.	"Two Hearts Beat as One" (Import mix)	3:42

== Charts ==
Chart (1983)	Peak position
Australia (Kent Music Report)	53
Ireland (IRMA)	2
New Zealand (Recorded Music NZ)	16
UK Singles (OCC)	18
US Billboard Bubbling Under the Hot 100	101
US Billboard Top Tracks	12

== See also ==
- List of covers of U2 songs – Two Hearts Beat as One
- Two of Hearts, 1986 song by Stacey Q
