= Blind Myself =

Hungarian metalcore band

- Origin: Hungary
- Genres: Metalcore
- Years active: 1995–present
- Labels: Warner Music Hungary / 1G, Hammer
- Members: Gergely Tóth – vocals István Horváth – guitar Gergely Édes – guitar Péter Bodnár – bass Valentin Jankai – drums
- Past members: István Török – drums Gábor Molnár – guitars László Sleisz – bass
- Website: blindmyself.com

Blind Myself is a Hungarian metalcore band formed in 1994.

== History ==
The band was formed by Gabor Molnar and Istvan Torok with an original line up of: Istvan Torok (drums), Gabor Molnar (guitars), and Laszlo Sleisz (bass). In 1996, they recorded their first demo, called Blind Yourself, and had their first nationwide tour. In 1997, they recorded their second demo, Horrified by the Sun, and had their first Sziget Festival appearance on Banan (talent) Stage. In 1998, their first EP, called Horrified by the Sun, was recorded and released by the band itself, distributed by Crossroads Records Hungary (Metal Hammer H 10/10) and their first video for Horrified by the Sun appeared on TV. That year they also toured in Hungary and performed at the Sziget Festival show. In 1999, Blind Myself signed with Warner Music Hungary / 1G Records and their first full length album, called Heaven't was released on Warner/1G (Metal Hammer H 9/10). A second video called "Kain" appeared on TV. In 2000, they had their first nationwide tour headlined Blind. They had an American tour with Ignite (they became the first band from the Hungarian metal scene to tour the USA) and the band settled down in NYC. The band played showcases in renowned clubs like CBGB's, Continental, L'Amour, Don Hills, etc.

For 2001, they continued to stay in New York City and worked in the City and lived in Brooklyn. They played showcases and gigs in NYC clubs (CBGB's, Continental, etc.) with bands like JJ Paradise Players Club, Puddle of Mudd (by accident), Keelhaul, Kill Your Idols, Ignite, Vision, etc. There were two sold out Hungarian shows in May (Budapest and Debrecen).

In 2002, their second album, called Product of Our Imagination, recorded in Hungary, was released by 1G Records (Metal Hammer H 9/10). The band opened for Slayer in Hungary at Petofi Hall. At Sziget they appeared on Metal Hammer Stage (the 2nd biggest stage) with Kreator. They played New York City club shows. The Brutal Comp. No.1. compilation CD was released by McGathy Radio Promotion Co./Edge., which includes 3 songs from Blind Myself (from Product of Our Imagination) and was played in more than 500 college radio stations throughout the United States. The cover was designed by Alan Roberts of Life of Agony. Blind Myself played at the Gainesville Hardcore festival in Florida.

In 2003, after a couple of New York City club shows and three years of living in the United States, the band moved back to Hungary. Their welcome back show was opening up for Isis in Budapest. They played major Hungarian summer festival appearances including Sziget with Napalm Death and had a nationwide tour in Hungary. At the Wanted Festival they opened for Sepultura on the Main Stage and had a first small European tour with Majority Rule.

Their third album, Worst-Case Scenario (label: Hammer/Edge Records – Hungarian Licensee of Relapse, Metal Blade, Nuclear Blast), was released in 2004. The album got rave reviews: Aardshock 94/100, Metal Hammer H 9/10. The band signed with Hardebaran Management and TwoFatMen Records/Twilight Distribution. They played major Hungarian festivals in 2004 and a Sziget gig at HammerWorld stage with Children of Bodom. They also released their third video for the song "Worst-Case Scenario".

They had a one month long European tour in Western Europe (Switzerland, Italy, Germany, France) and Eastern Europe (Slovakia, Slovenia, Czech Republic, Poland, Bulgaria, Serbia, Romania) in January and February 2005, followed by a small tour in Italy in May. Summer festival shows in Hungary including Sziget with 69 Eyes and Wanted Fest with Anthrax on the Main Stage took place. They played two shows in Vienna, Austria: opening up for Born from Pain and Open Air Against Racism Festival. The new video for the song called Wise-Men of the West appeared on TV in Hungary. Followed by a European tour in September with The Idoru (Slovenia, Latvia, Lithuania, Poland, Slovakia, Italy, the Netherlands, Germany, France, Switzerland, and Austria) for three weeks

In 2006, their fourth record, Ancient Scream Therapy, was released through Hammer Records in dualdisc format on 4 December. Track "Lost in Time" features the vocalist of Ignite (Zoli Teglas). An Eastern European tour in the Balkane and some shows in Western Europe including Dirty8 Festival in France with Hed PE followed. Ancient Scream Therapy made it to the first place on the album chart of Hungary's Hammer magazine. The band made another Sziget Festival appearance with Sick of It All at Hammer Stage. A video for Go Get A Life! from Ancient Scream Therapy was made. The band participated in Hungarian and international tours (Ukraine, Poland, Estonia, Latvia, and Lithuania).

== Discography ==
Year	Title	Label	Other Information
1998	Horrified by the Sun EP		EP
1999	Heaven't	1G Records/Warner Music Hungary	
2002	Product of Our Imagination	1G Records/Warner Music Hungary	
2004	Worst-Case Scenario	Edge/Hammer Records	
2006	Ancient Scream Therapy	Edge/Hammer Records/Tiefdruck-Musik/Universal Music	
2009	Budapest, 7fok, Eső	Edge/Hammer Records	
2010	Szumma	self released	Best-of collection
2014	Négyszögöl	self released	
