= Songs of Surrender =

2023 album by U2

Studio album of re-recorded songs by U2
- Released: 17 March 2023
- Studios: Shangri-La (Los Angeles); The Village (Los Angeles); Metropolis (London); Harbour Island
- Genre: Acoustic
- Length: 165:50
- Labels: Island; Interscope
- Producer: The Edge

U2 chronology
Songs of Experience (2017)	Songs of Surrender (2023)	Days of Ash (2026)

Singles from Songs of Surrender
- 1. "Pride (In the Name of Love)" Released: 11 January 2023; 2. "With or Without You" Released: 27 January 2023; 3. "One" Released: 12 February 2023; 4. "Beautiful Day" Released: 3 March 2023; 5. "Invisible" Released: 17 March 2023

Songs of Surrender is an album of re-recorded songs by Irish rock band U2. Produced by guitarist the Edge, it was released on 17 March 2023 on Island Records and Interscope Records. Largely the effort of the Edge and lead vocalist Bono, the album comprises re-recorded and reinterpreted versions of 40 songs from the group's back catalogue, many in stripped-down and acoustic arrangements. The album is a companion to Bono's memoir, Surrender: 40 Songs, One Story (2022), which was structured into 40 chapters titled after U2 songs. Rearranged versions of the songs were first included in the audiobook edition of the memoir, and were performed by Bono during the book's promotional tour.

Recording on Songs of Surrender began in 2021 and spanned a two-year period during lockdowns for the COVID-19 pandemic. The Edge and Bono worked on the album informally at the Edge's home and in France, as well as at recording studios in London and Los Angeles. During the sessions, the band members collaborated with numerous producers and musicians, including Bob Ezrin, Duncan Stewart, Declan Gaffney, and Stjepan Hauser.

Songs of Surrender was released on numerous formats in 16-track, 20-track, and 40-track editions, and a dozen coloured variants of the double-LP vinyl edition were produced. The album garnered mixed reception from critics. It debuted at number one on 11 charts in Europe, including in the United Kingdom for U2's 11th number one there and first since 2009. However, sales quickly tapered off; the album charted for only three weeks in the UK, and one week in the United States after debuting at number five. The album's release was accompanied by the television documentary film Bono & The Edge: A Sort of Homecoming, with Dave Letterman, which premiered on Disney+.

== Writing and recording ==
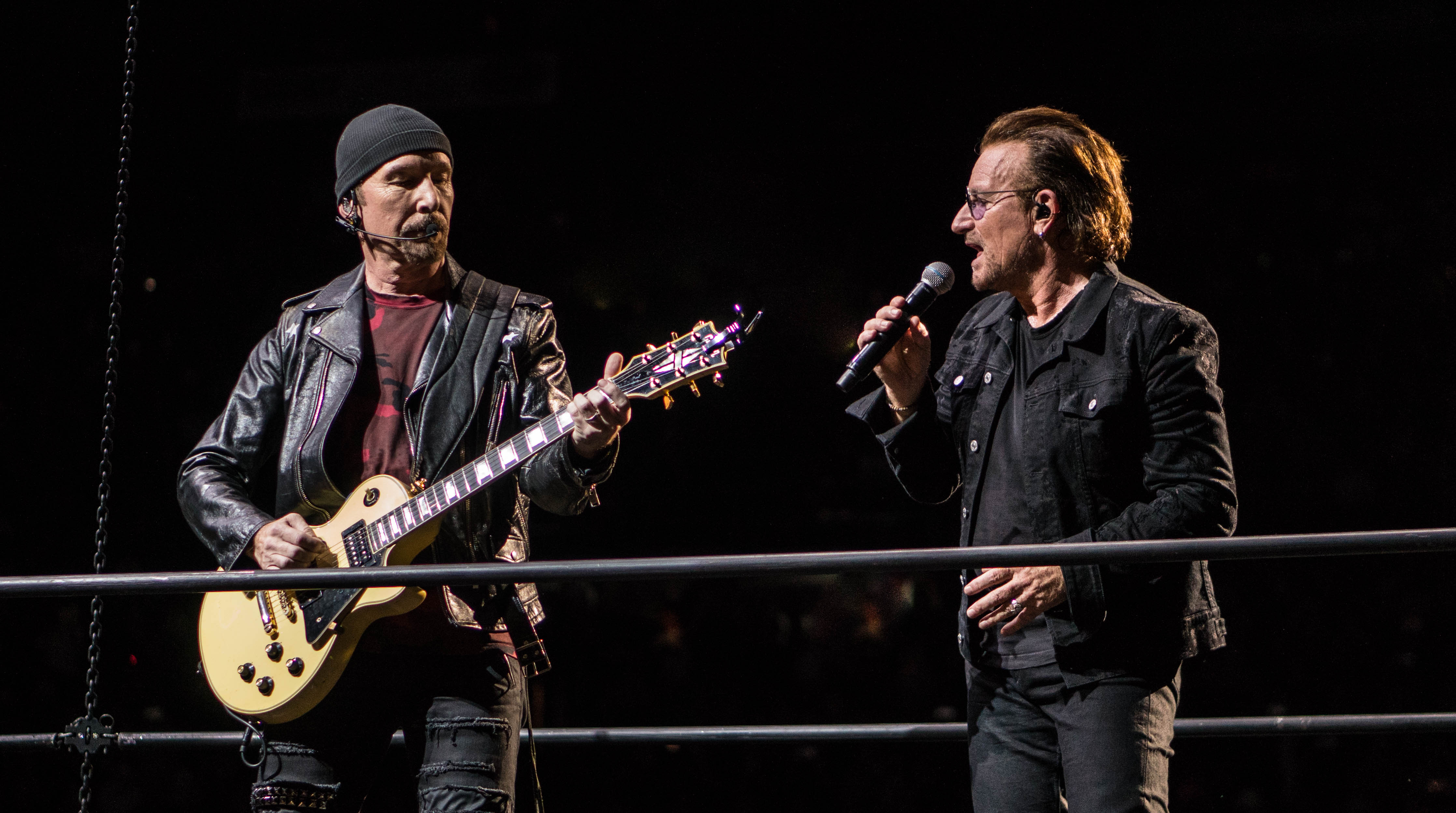
The album was mostly recorded by guitarist the Edge and lead vocalist Bono.

Songs of Surrender comprises re-recorded and reinterpreted versions of 40 songs from U2's back catalogue. Recorded over a two-year period during lockdowns for the COVID-19 pandemic, the album was largely the effort of guitarist the Edge and lead vocalist Bono, with the Edge also serving as the record's curator and producer. The idea to re-record U2 songs had been circulating within the band for a while, as the Edge wanted "to see if [their] songs could be reimagined in a more intimate style, as if Bono was singing in your ear". The Edge acknowledged many of the group's earliest songs were written with the intention of winning over audiences during live performances, and that as a result, there was an intensity to their music, particularly in Bono singing at the top of his range. The Edge said: "There's a sort of gladiatorial aspect to live performances when you're in that situation. The material has got to be pretty bold and even strident at times." By contrast, his overarching goal for re-recording songs was "to make intimacy the new version of punk rock for us".

Ultimately, the confluence of two events convinced the Edge to pursue a re-recording project: the pandemic lockdowns resulted in more free time that he viewed as a creative opportunity; and Bono decided to structure his memoir Surrender: 40 Songs, One Story into 40 chapters titled after U2 songs. The band discussed ideas for projects that they could undertake while Bono was busy writing his book. The Edge told them he was interested in experimenting with the songs from Surrender's chapter titles to see if he could, as bassist Adam Clayton described, "come up with a different space for those songs" and "present them in a way where the narrative of the song in some way is associated to the arc of the book". Since U2's record label was not expecting a new album, the band agreed that they would only release the project if they were satisfied with the results.

Work on Songs of Surrender began in earnest in early 2021. For the re-recordings, the band members decided that they did not need to remain faithful to the original versions of the songs; the Edge said, "We gave ourselves permission to disregard any sense of reverence for the originals." The Edge began with a rough outline for each song by choosing the key and tempo, before he composed musical ideas on acoustic guitar and piano, and improvised vocals that he would later play for Bono. Since the two share a similar vocal range, the Edge believed that they would be able to determine the viability of his vocal ideas once Bono attempted to sing them himself. The Edge conscientiously shifted songs into lower keys to better tailor them to Bono's vocal range, saying his goal was to "serve the song by serving the singer".

The duo were encouraged by the results of their first session together, during which Bono sang over the Edge's musical sketches. In the cases of several songs, including "Stories for Boys", "Two Hearts Beat as One", "Desire", and "Peace on Earth", Bono liked the Edge's demo vocals enough that he encouraged the Edge to sing on the final versions. While experimenting with new arrangements for the songs, the Edge changed their keys, chords, and rhythms, while Bono often rewrote the lyrics.

In developing the new versions of the songs, the Edge said he was "trying to come up with the minimum arrangement [they] could get away with", and that consequently they did not feel a strong urgency to have Clayton and drummer Larry Mullen Jr. perform on each song; Bono said that had they done so, "then [they'd] be just a rock band". After the Edge and Bono recorded demos of the new song arrangements and vocals, they sent them to Clayton and Mullen asking if they felt inspired to add any musical ideas to the rhythm section. Mullen said in November 2022 that he needed surgery to continue performing, and although he contributed percussion for Songs of Surrender, he "didn't want to, or wasn't ready to" play a full drum kit at the time of the recording sessions, according to the Edge. As a result, drum loops previously recorded by Mullen were used; one of them was the origin of the new version of "Get Out of Your Own Way". Clayton recorded his parts not knowing if they would be used on the final mixes, and he approached them with the mindset of "how those Simon & Garfunkel records were made... essentially acoustic guitar tracks that there were some rhythmic elements added to."

In subsequent sessions, the Edge and Bono worked casually using a makeshift recording room in the Edge's house. They occasionally collaborated when they were both in France at the same time. On one such occasion, they worked with producer Declan Gaffney and cellist Stjepan Hauser for four to five days. The sessions produced versions of "Vertigo" and "Dirty Day" that were based around the cello. The group also collaborated with engineer Duncan Stewart. In addition to working sporadically with each other for a few days at a time in informal settings, the Edge and Bono held formal recording sessions in London and Los Angeles. In the London session, which was intended to "really get the ball rolling", producer Brian Eno recorded vocals and Clayton laid down bass tracks. For the song "All I Want Is You", Clayton played acoustic bass. For "The Fly", both the Edge and Clayton played bass, contrasting with the guitar-heavy arrangement of the original version. In Los Angeles, the Edge and Bono worked with producer Bob Ezrin, and musicians Daniel Lanois and Abe Laboriel Jr. recorded backing vocals. Ezrin reviewed the band's demo recordings to help them determine which song arrangements worked and which ones needed refinement. The Edge said that the sessions in Los Angeles "fleshed out the arrangement" of the songs and "helped [them] get the project over the line".

One song that saw the most extensive lyrical changes was "Walk On", which was originally released in 2000. At the time, Bono had written it for Burmese academic Aung San Suu Kyi, who was under house arrest from 1989 to 2010 for her pro-democracy activities. Following her ascent to the office of state counsellor, she was criticised for Myanmar's inaction to the genocide of the Rohingya people. Bono said he "felt so let down" by her and decided to re-write the song's lyrics for a different person, instead paying tribute to Ukrainian President Volodymyr Zelenskyy for his leadership against the Russian invasion of his country. Bono and the Edge performed the new version of the song on 9 April 2022 for Global Citizen's Stand Up for Ukraine livestream, which was organised to urge world leaders to raise funds for Ukrainian refugees. As vocals were being recorded for Songs of Surrender and preparations were being made to mix the album, Bono and the Edge were invited by Zelenskyy's chief of staff to visit Ukraine for a performance. They immediately halted work on the album and within 3–4 days boarded a train into Kyiv. They performed the new version of "Walk On" for Zelenskyy in a subway station during their 8 May visit.

Over the course of recording Songs of Surrender, the Edge estimated that the group created 50 new song arrangements in total. Songs such as "Angel of Harlem" and "Moment of Surrender" were in contention to be included on the album but were ultimately left off.

== Release and promotion ==
=== Pre-announcement updates ===
Clayton first mentioned a re-recording project during a June 2021 interview with Rocky O'Riordan on the band's U2-X Radio station on SiriusXM: "we are playing around with rearranging some of the songs that we have and setting them in a more acoustic environment. Edge got a bit of a bee in his bonnet and... said let's look at these songs and imagine them in a different context. So we are playing around with that. He's putting a lot of work into changing the keys, and moving them onto piano and that sort of thing." Clayton added that he hoped for a release by the end of 2021.

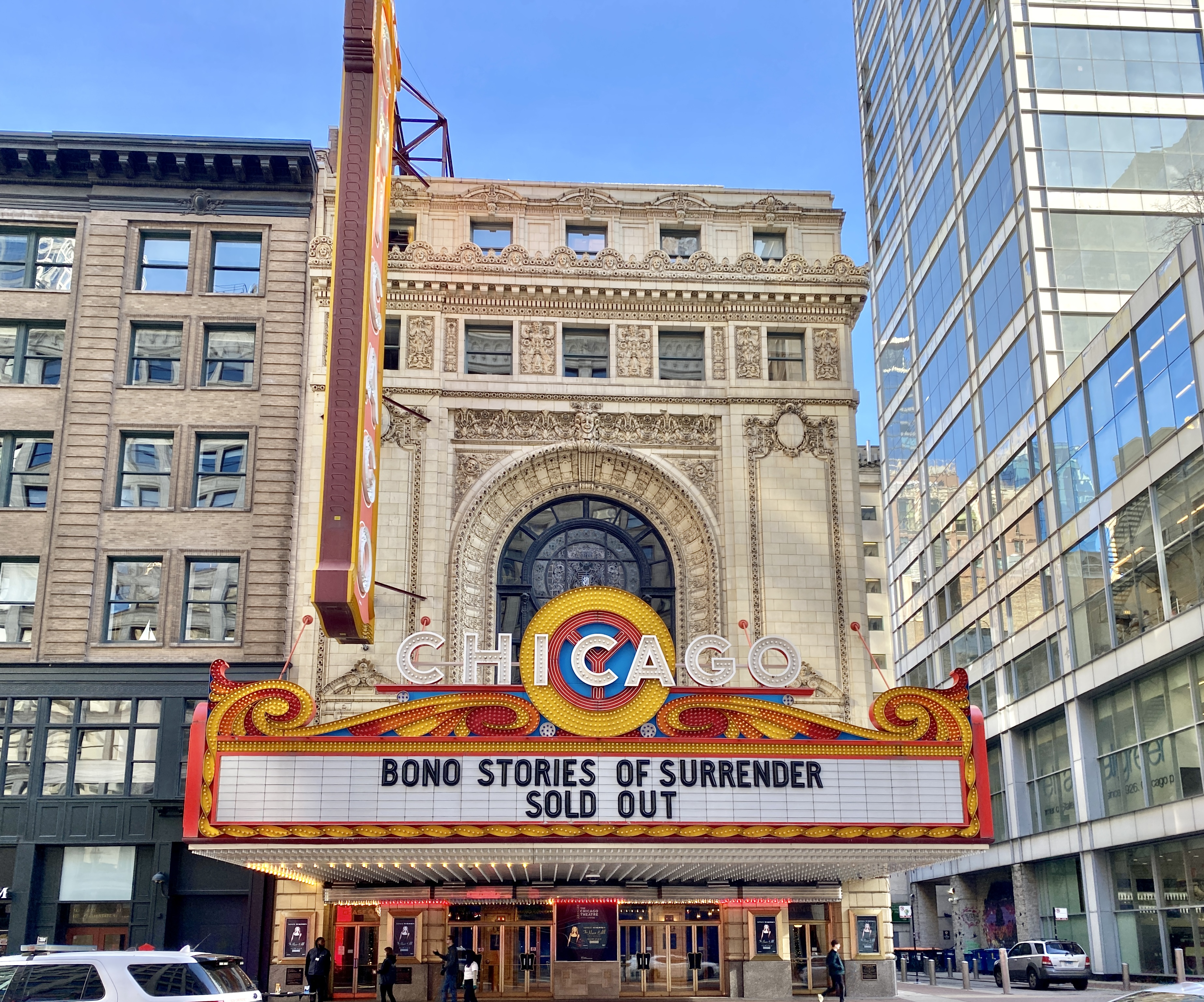
The marquee of the Chicago Theatre, prior to a November 2022 performance by Bono on his Stories of Surrender tour

Following the release of Surrender: 40 Songs, One Story in November 2022, new arrangements of U2 songs began to materialise publicly. For the audiobook edition of the memoir, each chapter was briefly introduced with a re-recording of the song for which it was named, and during the "Stories of Surrender" promotional tour for the book, Bono performed many songs in stripped-down arrangements with the aid of musicians Kate Ellis (cello, keyboards, vocals), Gemma Doherty (harp, keyboards, vocals), and U2 producer Jacknife Lee ("musical director" – keyboards, percussion).

Before Songs of Surrender was officially announced, Bono mentioned the album by name in a section of his memoir titled "After the After Words". After acknowledging he had rewritten some of his lyrics in the book, he wrote: "During lockdown we were able to reimagine forty U2 tracks for the Songs of Surrender collection, which gave me a chance to live inside those songs again as I wrote this memoir. It also meant I could deal with something that's been nagging me for some time. The lyrics on a few songs that I've always felt were never quite written. They are now. (I think.)" In late November 2022, in a Washington Post article profiling the band prior to their receiving Kennedy Center Honors, writer Geoff Edgers said that the group had recorded "40 stripped-down versions of the songs featured in the memoir" and that the collection was targeted for release in early 2023.

=== Announcement and singles ===
In January 2023, select U2 fans worldwide received photocopies of a handwritten letter by the Edge via postal mail in which he teased the project. The top of the letter bore a short sequence of Morse code that spelled out the album title. Around the same time, 40 of the group's songs were updated on Spotify with an embedded video snippet that depicted the same Morse code, leading fans to piece together what they believed to be the track listing.

Songs of Surrender was officially announced on 10 January 2023 with a trailer video soundtracked by a new version of "Beautiful Day"; the video also revealed the album's release date of 17 March. The day after the project was announced, the track listings and release formats were confirmed. Although it was speculated that the record's 40 tracks would match the book's 40 chapter names, the two do not completely align with one another; ultimately, 28 songs match across both projects. All studio albums from the group's career are represented with the exception of: October (1981); No Line on the Horizon (2009); and Original Soundtracks 1 (1995), U2's collaboration with Eno that was released under the pseudonym "Passengers".

The announcement of the track listings was accompanied by the release of a new version of "Pride (In the Name of Love)", which was premiered by radio host Dave Fanning on RTÉ 2fm. A second song, "With or Without You", was released on 27 January, and a third song, "One", soundtracked the National Football League's presentation of the Walter Payton NFL Man of the Year Award prior to Super Bowl LVII on 12 February. A fourth song, "Beautiful Day", was released on 3 March.

=== Formats and editions ===
The album was released in the following formats:

- Digital download – full track listing of 40 songs
- Super Deluxe Hardback Collector's edition (4 CDs, or 4 vinyl LPs) – full track listing of 40 songs
- Deluxe edition (CD) – 20 songs
- Standard edition (CD, 2 vinyl LPs, or cassette tape) – 16 songs

A dozen limited-edition coloured variants of the double-vinyl LP were produced, including: a blue-and-gold one themed after the University of Notre Dame; a green-and-white one themed after the Boston Celtics basketball team; a blue one available only to SiriusXM radio subscribers; and variants exclusive to Target, Amazon, and independent retailers.

For Record Store Day in April 2023, U2 released a limited-edition, four-track EP on 180-gram white vinyl record that contained two versions of "Sunday Bloody Sunday" and "Two Hearts Beat as One": their original studio versions from War (1983) on side A, and their re-recorded versions from Songs of Surrender on side B. Among singles exclusive to Record Store Day 2023, it was the second-best-selling release at independent music retailers in the US.

=== Companion projects and marketing ===
On 21 February 2023, the group announced that they had commissioned 40 artists to create 60-second videos to accompany each of the album's tracks, and that they would be progressively released through a YouTube playlist. The week of the album release, the band announced a "40 songs, 40 cities" promotion, whereby fans could gather at a location in 40 cities worldwide to find a lyrical tribute to the album's songs, as well as access exclusive merchandise and a bespoke photo filter.

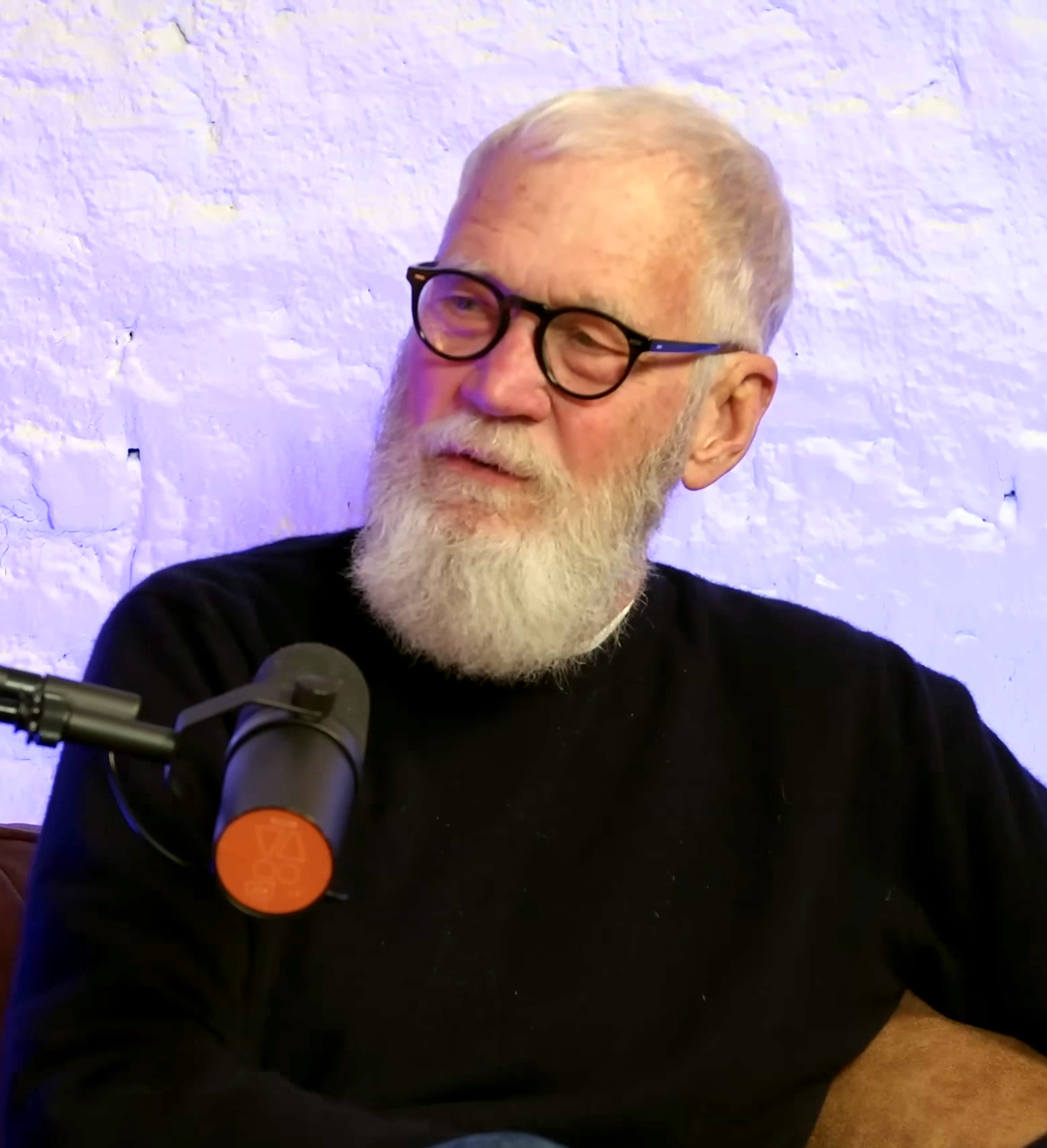
The television documentary Bono & The Edge: A Sort of Homecoming, released to coincide with the album, features comedian David Letterman.

To coincide with the album's 17 March release date, Disney+ released the television special Bono & The Edge: A Sort of Homecoming, with Dave Letterman. Directed by Morgan Neville, the programme features documentary footage of Bono and the Edge touring their native Dublin with comedian David Letterman, as well as a concert performance at Ambassador Theatre. The film was nominated for a Primetime Emmy Award for Outstanding Sound Mixing for a Variety Series or Special.

Several radio programmes aired in promotion of the album. On 17 March, iHeartRadio broadcast "iHeartRadio ICONS with The Edge: Celebrating U2's Songs of Surrender", for which the Edge was interviewed by host Jim Kerr. On the band's U2 X-Radio station of Sirius XM, two specials were broadcast starting the day of the album's release: "Songs of Surrender: A Conversation with Bono and Edge", featuring a discussion with the two band members; and "Songs of Surrender Track-by-Track Hosted by U2", which played the entire the album. Bono and the Edge also performed for BBC Radio 2's Piano Room and NPR Music's Tiny Desk Concert series.

== Reception ==
Professional ratings
Aggregate scores
Source	Rating
AnyDecentMusic?	5.6/10
Metacritic	66/100
Review scores
Source	Rating
The Daily Telegraph	4/5 stars
The Guardian	3/5 stars
Hot Press	8/10
The Independent	2/5 stars
Mojo	4/5 stars
NME	3/5 stars
Pitchfork	5.7/10
PopMatters	5/10
Rolling Stone	4/5 stars
The Times	4/5 stars

At Metacritic, which assigns a weighted mean rating out of 100 to reviews from mainstream critics, Songs of Surrender has an average score of 66 based on 15 reviews, 10 of which were mixed. At AnyDecentMusic?, which collates reviews from more than 50 media sources, the album scored 5.6 out of 10, based on 14 reviews.

Tom Doyle of Mojo said that for U2, the album "sounds like a kind of liberation. If their creative missteps in the past two decades have generally been caused by their twin determinations to keep up with modern pop and relentlessly pursue music that works in stadia, then here they've cut themselves free from all of that." Joe Gross of Rolling Stone said that the stripped-down song arrangements redeemed the Edge from any accusations of being over-reliant on guitar effects, and that his work on the album "reminds you these are sturdy songs that can be rethought without any sonic window dressing". John Walshe of Hot Press said the re-recordings mostly "work beautifully and occasionally surprisingly" and that: "Stripping these songs back to their core gives both band and listener a chance to re-connect with them, to hear them with fresh ears. For the most part, that also serves to remind us just how bloody magnificent they were in the first place." Neil McCormick of The Daily Telegraph said that "altered perspectives" such as the one from "Dirty Day" helped "make this measured, inventive, introspective collection so compelling, as U2 turn their own songs inside out in search of new nuances and meanings". Will Hodgkinson of The Times was struck by a "sense of the reworked music reflecting the inevitable ravages of age, and the greater degree of reflection that brings". He said that "modesty — a word I never thought I would write in relation to U2—is exactly what makes Songs of Surrender a gentle, rather moving reinvention".

Jon Pareles of The New York Times said that the reimagined tracks removed too many of the group's strengths, with the "surging, cathartic peaks of songs like 'With or Without You,' 'Vertigo,' and 'Pride (in the Name of Love)'... far too muted." He thought the group's "Wild original impulses [had] been replaced by latter-day self-consciousness" and that they were better served looking forward than being reminiscent. Caryn Rose of Pitchfork opined that Bono's lyrical subversions did not improve the songs but rather were distracting, and she judged that musically "The arrangements are formulaic, regressing back to the stripped-down candlelit era of the original MTV's Unplugged." Damian Jones of NME said, "There is disappointment that a number of U2's big-hitters don't translate well", but he thought it was not a "totally fruitless endeavour: you just have to dig a little bit deeper to find the reimagined material that's truly worth savouring." John Garratt of PopMatters questioned the necessity of a quadruple album with minimal alterations to the songs and lamented the band's shift from previously surprising listeners to being predictable. He criticised the group for having the songs "repeat the same mistake made 21 years prior when The Best of 1990–2000 was regrettably peppered with 'new' mixes – they just aren't that interesting." Alexis Petridis of The Guardian believed the album was unwieldy, saying that when listening to it all at once, "it struggles to hold your attention", but that "Taken in smaller doses, there are great moments marked by a sense of genuine reinvention". Petridis enjoyed the reimagined deep cuts the most and thought the group's biggest songs "don't work rendered in soft-focus miniature". Helen Brown of The Independent called Songs of Surrender "an album of shadow versions that leave you yearning for originals", and she posited that an album of intimate, sombre songs might have resonated more had it been released during the pandemic "when time bent to make sense of such lengthy releases. But it's 2023 now, and we need the wide-horizon howl and electric ambition of U2's classic sound, not this sleepy faux-hipster slog."

== Commercial performance ==
In the United States, Songs of Surrender debuted at number five on the Billboard 200, with 46,500 album-equivalent units earned. The figure was calculated from: 42,000 pure sales (comprising 19,500 vinyl copies, 13,500 CD copies, 500 cassette copies, and 8,500 digital downloads); 4,000 streaming equivalent albums (from 4.99 million on-demand streams); and 500 track equivalent albums. It was the band's 13th album to chart in the top 10 in the US. U2 became just the fourth group with a newly-charting title in the top 10 of the Billboard 200 in the 1980s, 1990s, 2000s, 2010s, and 2020s, joining AC/DC, Def Leppard, and Metallica. The album also debuted at number one on six Billboard charts: Top Album Sales, Top Rock & Alternative Albums, Top Rock Albums, Top Alternative Albums, Vinyl Albums, and Top Current Album Sales. The album's first-week sales of 19,500 vinyl copies in the US was U2's highest-selling week on vinyl since Luminate began electronically tracking sales figures in 1991. The week after its debut, Songs of Surrender dropped off the Billboard 200 entirely.

In the United Kingdom, Songs of Surrender debuted at number one on the UK Albums Chart, with first-week sales of 20,569 units (comprising 11,042 CD copies, 6,000 vinyl copies, 1,008 cassette copies, 1,407 digital downloads, and 1,112 streaming equivalent units). It was the band's first number-one album in the UK since No Line on the Horizon in 2009, and overall was their 11th number-one album in the UK, tying them with David Bowie on the all-time list. The same week, the album also topped the country's Official Vinyl Albums Chart, while the group's 2006 compilation U218 Singles re-entered the UK Albums Chart at number 38. In its second week, Songs of Surrender fell to number 34 on the UK Albums Chart. The record charted for just three weeks in the UK.

In Ireland, Songs of Surrender debuted at number one on the Irish Albums Chart to become the group's 10th number-one album in their native country, and the same week U218 Singles jumped 28 spots on the chart to number five.

== Track listing ==
=== Full digital and super deluxe physical versions ===
All lyrics are written by Bono and the Edge, except where noted; all music is composed by U2, except where noted. Credits reflect the rewritten versions of the songs, not the original versions.

Disc one – The Edge
No.	Title	Originally released on	Length
1.	"One" (lyrics: Bono)	Achtung Baby (1991)	3:36
2.	"Where the Streets Have No Name" (lyrics: Bono)	The Joshua Tree (1987)	4:17
3.	"Stories for Boys"	Boy (1980)	2:51
4.	"11 O'Clock Tick Tock"	non-album single (1980)	3:58
5.	"Out of Control"	Boy	4:09
6.	"Beautiful Day" (lyrics: Bono)	All That You Can't Leave Behind (2000)	3:53
7.	"Bad"	The Unforgettable Fire (1984)	5:31
8.	"Every Breaking Wave"	Songs of Innocence (2014)	5:11
9.	"Walk On (Ukraine)"	All That You Can't Leave Behind	4:07
10.	"Pride (In the Name of Love)"	The Unforgettable Fire	3:57
Total length:			41:30

Disc two – Larry
No.	Title	Originally released on	Length
11.	"Who's Gonna Ride Your Wild Horses"	Achtung Baby	5:17
12.	"Get Out of Your Own Way" (lyrics: Bono)	Songs of Experience (2017)	3:27
13.	"Stuck in a Moment You Can't Get Out Of"	All That You Can't Leave Behind	4:34
14.	"Red Hill Mining Town"	The Joshua Tree	5:02
15.	"Ordinary Love" (music: U2, Brian Burton; lyrics: Bono)	Mandela: Long Walk to Freedom soundtrack (2013)	3:13
16.	"Sometimes You Can't Make It on Your Own" (lyrics: Bono)	How to Dismantle an Atomic Bomb (2004)	5:00
17.	"Invisible" (lyrics: Bono)	non-album single (2014)	4:23
18.	"Dirty Day"	Zooropa (1993)	3:57
19.	"The Miracle (of Joey Ramone)"	Songs of Innocence	3:29
20.	"City of Blinding Lights" (lyrics: Bono)	How to Dismantle an Atomic Bomb	4:55
Total length:			43:17

Disc three – Adam
No.	Title	Originally released on	Length
21.	"Vertigo" (lyrics: Bono)	How to Dismantle an Atomic Bomb	3:29
22.	"I Still Haven't Found What I'm Looking For"	The Joshua Tree	4:15
23.	"Electrical Storm" (lyrics: Bono)	The Best of 1990–2000 (2002)	4:13
24.	"The Fly"	Achtung Baby	4:02
25.	"If God Will Send His Angels"	Pop (1997)	5:14
26.	"Desire"	Rattle and Hum (1988)	2:56
27.	"Until the End of the World"	Achtung Baby	4:44
28.	"Song for Someone"	Songs of Innocence	3:48
29.	"All I Want Is You"	Rattle and Hum	4:28
30.	"Peace on Earth" (lyrics: Bono)	All That You Can't Leave Behind	4:22
Total length:			41:31

Disc four – Bono
No.	Title	Originally released on	Length
31.	"With or Without You"	The Joshua Tree	3:14
32.	"Stay (Faraway, So Close!)"	Zooropa	5:03
33.	"Sunday Bloody Sunday"	War (1983)	4:13
34.	"Lights of Home" (music: U2, Alana Haim, Danielle Haim, Este Haim, Ariel Rechtshaid; lyrics: Bono)	Songs of Experience	4:20
35.	"Cedarwood Road"	Songs of Innocence	3:24
36.	"I Will Follow"	Boy	3:40
37.	"Two Hearts Beat as One"	War	4:08
38.	"Miracle Drug" (lyrics: Bono)	How to Dismantle an Atomic Bomb	3:35
39.	"The Little Things That Give You Away" (lyrics: Bono)	Songs of Experience	4:52
40.	"40"	War	3:03
Total length:			39:32; 165:50

=== Standard and deluxe physical versions ===
Standard 16-track CD, vinyl, and cassette
No.	Title	Length
1.	"One"	3:36
2.	"Where the Streets Have No Name"	4:17
3.	"Stories for Boys"	2:51
4.	"Walk On (Ukraine)"	4:07
5.	"Pride (In the Name of Love)"	3:57
6.	"City of Blinding Lights"	4:55
7.	"Ordinary Love"	3:13
8.	"Invisible"	4:23
9.	"Vertigo"	3:29
10.	"I Still Haven't Found What I'm Looking For"	4:15
11.	"The Fly"	4:02
12.	"If God Will Send His Angels"	5:14
13.	"Stay (Faraway, So Close!)"	5:03
14.	"Sunday Bloody Sunday"	4:13
15.	"I Will Follow"	3:40
16.	"40"	3:03

Deluxe 20-track CD
No.	Title	Length
1.	"One"	3:36
2.	"Where the Streets Have No Name"	4:17
3.	"Stories for Boys"	2:51
4.	"Beautiful Day"	3:53
5.	"Walk On (Ukraine)"	4:07
6.	"Pride (In the Name of Love)"	3:57
7.	"City of Blinding Lights"	4:55
8.	"Red Hill Mining Town"	5:02
9.	"Ordinary Love"	3:13
10.	"Invisible"	4:23
11.	"Vertigo"	3:29
12.	"I Still Haven't Found What I'm Looking For"	4:15
13.	"The Fly"	4:02
14.	"If God Will Send His Angels"	5:14
15.	"Until the End of the World"	4:44
16.	"With or Without You"	3:14
17.	"Stay (Faraway, So Close!)"	5:03
18.	"Sunday Bloody Sunday"	4:13
19.	"I Will Follow"	3:40
20.	"40"	3:03

- On digital releases, all tracks are suffixed with "Songs of Surrender" to differentiate them from the original recordings.

== Personnel ==
Adapted from the liner notes. Track numbers correspond to the album's full 40-song track listing.

U2

- Bono – vocals
- The Edge – guitar, vocals, piano, keyboards, additional bass (tracks 5, 24, 26–27), additional bass guitar (37), Rhodes (2, 31), bass programming (4, 23), dulcimer (17, 24, 26), Wurlitzer electric piano (31, 37, 40), drum programming (30), ukulele (33, 40)
- Adam Clayton – bass guitar
- Larry Mullen Jr. – drums and percussion, piano (1)

Additional performers

- Abe Laboriel Jr. – backing vocals and vocal arrangement (1)
- Bob Ezrin – synthesizer (6), cello (40), organ (29), acoustic guitar (32), sound effects (32), strings and string arrangement (32)
- Duncan Stewart – guitar (17), percussion (37), keyboards (34), backing vocals (19, 37), Rhodes (31), synthesizer (2, 19), additional keyboards (6, 9), programming (9), organ (16, 34), Wurlitzer electric piano (22–23, 31), marimba (25), drum programming and synthesizer programming (26), acoustic guitar (32), flute (34), hand claps (37)
- Declan Gaffney – piano (28, 35), synthesizer (2)
- Hauser – cello (2, 18, 21)
- Terry Lawless – additional keyboards (5, 36)
- Anil Sebastian – choir (6)
- Anna Holloway – choir (6)
- Caitlin Sinclair – choir (6)
- Cerian Holland – choir (6)
- Connor Going – choir (6)
- Didier Rochard – choir (6)
- Jeremy Franklin – choir (6)
- Kate Westall – choir (6)
- Liv Barath – choir (6)
- Lydia Clowes – choir (6)
- Chloe Dale Poswilo – backing vocals (6)
- Hollis Howard – backing vocals (6)
- Peter Gregson – cello (7, 9)
- John Metcalfe – brass band and horn arrangement (8), strings and string arrangement (32)
- Karsh Kale – bells (10), choir arrangement (10), orchestra (10)
- Hillspring Children's Choir (Mumbai) – choir (10)
- Kamakshi Khanna – choir (10)
- Ezra Mullen – tambourine (13)
- Dan Oestreicher – alto saxophone and baritone saxophone (14)
- Rori Coleman – brass band (14)
- Trombone Shorty – brass band (14)
- Yirmayah Yisrael – tenor saxophone (14)
- Andres Forero – percussion (16)
- Brian Eno – backing vocals (22)
- Daniel Lanois – backing vocals (22)
- Stuart Morgan – Fender bass (22)
- Andy Barlow – additional keyboards (39)
- Jolyon Thomas – guitar and additional keyboards (39)

Technical personnel

- The Edge – production, engineering (3, 5, 7, 10–12, 15, 18, 20, 23, 25, 30–31, 34, 38)
- Bob Ezrin – production (6, 29), co-production (1, 3–5, 7–16, 19–20, 22–23, 28, 31–32, 34–35, 38–40), mixing (38)
- Duncan Stewart – production (6, 26, 37), additional production (1–5, 7–10, 12–17, 19–20, 22–25, 27–29, 31–36, 38–40), engineering (1–29, 31–40), mixing (1–15, 17, 19–20, 22, 24–28, 30–40)
- Declan Gaffney – production (18), additional production (21, 36), engineering (2, 4, 7–9, 15, 18–19, 21, 26–28, 32, 34–36), mixing (8, 18, 21, 36)
- Richard Rainey – additional production (14), engineering (2, 9, 14, 19, 22, 24, 28, 31, 37–39), mixing (19, 37)
- Bono – production (31)
- Alastair McMillan – engineering (1, 4, 6–15, 17, 19, 21–24, 27–29, 31–35, 37–40), mixing (7, 19, 39)
- Julian Shank – additional engineering (1, 3, 6, 9–11, 14–17, 19, 23, 25, 28, 30, 32, 34, 37–39)
- Bobby Mota – additional engineering (3, 15, 28, 35, 37, 39)
- Jonathan Pfarr – engineering (6), additional engineering (3, 10–12, 15, 18, 26, 28, 37)
- Alisse Laymac – engineering (4, 11, 13, 16, 19, 22–24, 27, 39)
- Nicole Schmidt – additional engineering (4, 7–8, 19, 23, 25–26, 32–34)
- Toby Alington – engineering (6)
- Rab McAllister – additional engineering (6, 33)
- Paul Schoen – engineering (14)
- Rob Kinelski – mixing (16, 23, 29)
- Eli Heisler – mixing assistance (16, 23, 29)
- Scott Sedillo – mastering

== Charts ==
=== Weekly charts ===
Weekly chart performance for Songs of Surrender
Chart (2023)	Peak position
Australian Albums (ARIA)	3
Austrian Albums (Ö3 Austria)	1
Belgian Albums (Ultratop Flanders)	1
Belgian Albums (Ultratop Wallonia)	1
Canadian Albums (Billboard)	5
Croatian International Albums (HDU)	1
Czech Albums (ČNS IFPI)	15
Danish Albums (Hitlisten)	8
Dutch Albums (Album Top 100)	1
Finnish Albums (Suomen virallinen lista)	29
French Albums (SNEP)	2
German Albums (Offizielle Top 100)	1
Greek Albums (IFPI)	6
Hungarian Albums (MAHASZ)	7
Irish Albums (Official Charts)	1
Italian Albums (FIMI)	1
Japanese Albums (Oricon)	15
Japanese Combined Albums (Oricon)	19
Japanese Hot Albums (Billboard Japan)	14
New Zealand Albums (RMNZ)	8
Norwegian Albums (VG-lista)	12
Polish Albums (ZPAV)	4
Portuguese Albums (AFP)	1
Scottish Albums (Official Charts)	1
Spanish Albums (Promusicae)	2
Swedish Albums (Sverigetopplistan)	24
Swiss Albums (Schweizer Hitparade)	1
UK Albums (Official Charts)	1
US Billboard 200	5
US Top Alternative Albums (Billboard)	1
US Top Rock Albums (Billboard)	1

=== Year-end charts ===
Year-end chart performance for Songs of Surrender
Chart (2023)	Position
Belgian Albums (Ultratop Flanders)	101
Belgian Albums (Ultratop Wallonia)	71
French Albums (SNEP)	36
German Albums (Offizielle Top 100)	50
Spanish Albums (PROMUSICAE)	93
Swiss Albums (Schweizer Hitparade)	85

== Certifications ==
Certifications and sales figures for Songs of Surrender
Region	Certification	Certified units/sales
France (SNEP)	Gold	50,000^{‡}
^{‡} Sales+streaming figures based on certification alone.
