= Family (Ignite album) =

Studio album by Ignite

Studio album by Ignite
- Released: 1995
- Recorded: Orange County, California
- Studio: For the Record Studios
- Genre: Melodic hardcore
- Length: 26:03
- Labels: Lost & Found
- Producer: Jim Monroe

Ignite chronology
Scarred for Life (1994)	Family (1995)	Ignite / Good Riddance (1996)

Family is the second studio release by Californian melodic hardcore band Ignite.

The same year, Ignite released Call on My Brothers through Conversion Records. The two releases share recordings, but differ in their track listings and running times. Family contains ten tracks, while Call on My Brothers features additional material, including "Straight Ahead", "Black Light", "Faraway", "In My Time" and "Aggression".

Call on My Brothers was subsequently reissued by Revelation Records in 2000, with remastered audio and an expanded track listing.

== Track listing ==
Original version
No.	Title	Length
1.	"Call on My Brothers"	2:17
2.	"Ash Return"	3:39
3.	"Distance"	2:37
4.	"Slow"	1:50
5.	"You"	3:58
6.	"Epidemic"	2:22
7.	"Sided"	2:10
8.	"Family"	2:21
9.	"Should Have Known"	1:47
10.	"50 and a Month"	3:02
Total length:		26:03

Call on My Brothers

1. "Ash Return"
2. "Straight Ahead"
3. "Black Light"
4. "Faraway"
5. "You"
6. "Epidemic"
7. "In My Time"
8. "Distance"
9. "Call on My Brothers"
10. "Should Have Known"
11. "Aggression"
12. "Slow"
13. "Sided"
14. "Family"
15. "50 & a Month"
16. "Man Against Man"
17. "Screaming for Change" (bonus track)

== Personnel ==
- Brett Rasmussen – bass
- Casey Jones – drums, photography
- Joe D. Foster – guitar, photography
- Zoli Teglas – vocals
- Jim Monroe – production
- Dave Mandel, Gene Rice, Jinko – photography
