= A War Against You =

Studio album by Ignite
- Released: January 8, 2016
- Genre: Melodic hardcore
- Label: Century Media
- Producer: Cameron Webb

Ignite chronology
Our Darkest Days (2006)	A War Against You (2016)	Ignite (2022)

Professional ratings
Review scores
Source	Rating
Nerdist	5/5 stars
Metal Blast	2.5/5 stars
Punknews	4/5 stars
Scene Point Blank	5/5 stars
Metal Hammer	4/5 stars
Lambgoat	7/10
Ultimate Guitar	6/10

A War Against You is the fifth studio album by American melodic hardcore band Ignite. It was released on January 8, 2016, on Century Media Records. The album contains the hidden track "Falu" ("Village" in Hungarian), which is the Hungarian version of "Where I'm From".

It is Ignite's final album with long-time vocalist Zoltán "Zoli" Téglás, who left the band in 2020.

== Critical reception ==
The album was met with generally positive reviews, Nik Young of Metal Hammer wrote “This is a spirited album from a band in no danger of running out of songs any time soon.” Scence Point Blank added “A War Against You seems to start off a little groggy, but eventually it finally wakes up. It could have gotten rid of a couple tracks, but ultimately they don't take away from anything great in the album. There's no doubt in my mind that A War Against You has found its own identity among the rest of Ignite's catalog and is a welcome addition. Ignite is back and better than ever.” Benjamin Bailey of Nerdist gave the album a perfect score stating “War Against You just might be their best record, and that is not something I say lightly. Heavy, catchy, and heartfelt, this record is beyond superb.”

== Track listing ==
No.	Title	Length
1.	"Begin Again"	3:23
2.	"Nothing Can Stop Me"	3:18
3.	"This Is a War"	3:25
4.	"Oh No Not Again"	3:42
5.	"Alive"	3:15
6.	"You Saved Me"	3:03
7.	"Rise Up"	3:47
8.	"Where I'm From"	3:22
9.	"The Suffering"	2:18
10.	"How Is This Progress?"	3:13
11.	"You Lie"	2:27
12.	"Descend"	3:02
13.	"Forward" (bonus track)	2:18
14.	"Work" (contains the hidden track "Falu")	6:44

== Charts ==
Chart (2016)	Peak position
Austria Top 40 (03A)	26
Belgium Charts (Ultratop)	36
Germany Albums (GKF)	12
Hungarian Albums (MAHASZ)	5
Switzerland (Hitparade)	55
US HeatSeekers (Billboard)	6
US Rock (Billboard)	41
US Hard Rock (Billboard)	10
US Independent (Billboard)	22
