= Straight Ahead (Ignite album) =

Compilation album by Ignite
- Released: 1997
- Genre: Melodic hardcore
- Label: Rovers & Arlekin

Ignite chronology
Past Our Means (1996)	Straight Ahead (1997)	A Place Called Home (2000)

Straight Ahead is a compilation album by Californian melodic hardcore band Ignite. It contains the In My Time EP (Lost & Found Records, 1995), the first five tracks from Scarred For Life (Lost & Found, 1994), and the title track from Call On My Brothers.

== Track listing ==
A side

1. "Straight Ahead"
2. "In My Time"
3. "Black Light"
4. "Faraway"
5. "Aggression"
6. "Man Against Man"

B side

1. "Call On My Brothers"
2. "Automatic"
3. "Slow"
4. "Where They Talk"
5. "Shade"
6. "Turn"
