= 21 Guns =

21 Guns or Twenty-One Guns may refer to:

- 21-gun salute, an arms salute as a military honor
- 21 Guns (band), a 1990s rock band formed by Thin Lizzy guitarist Scott Gorham
- "21 Guns" (song), a song from Green Day's 2009 album 21st Century Breakdown
- "Twenty-One Guns" (ER), a 2006 episode from the 12th season of the medical drama ER
- "Twenty-One Guns", a song on the 1996 split EP Ignite / Good Riddance
