= Burnthe8track =

Canadian punk rock band

- Origin: Winnipeg, Manitoba, Canada
- Genre: Punk rock
- Years active: 2001–2008
- Labels: Abacus Recordings/Century Media Records, Coretex Records, Ass-Card Records, Curve Music
- Members: Derek Kun; Jason Kun; Sam Osland; Ethan Osland; Mike Goreski
- Website: http://www.burnthe8track.com (defunct)

Burnthe8track is a Canadian punk rock band that is currently on hiatus. Band members have included singer Derek Kun, guitarist Jason Kun, drummer Sam Osland, and bassists Mike Goreski, Ethan Osland, Buck Garringer, and Kevin Feeleus.

== History ==
Burnthe8track was formed in 2001 by Derek Kun, Jason Kun, Sam Osland, and Kevin Feeleus. Kevin Feeleus left the band after the independent release of the Division E.P in 2002. Buck Garringer of the Harlots briefly joined the band before being replaced by Mike Goreski. In that same year, the band performed at Winnipeg's Grand Beach Music Fest. Their debut album, The Ocean, was released in 2004 to positive reviews through Century Media/Abacus/Alveran. Some of the earlier tracks were re-released in 2005 on an EP titled Division, through the Coretex label. Division was later released as a full album in 2008.

In support of these recordings, burnthe8track toured extensively and performed from 2002 through 2009, including their participation in the 2005 Van Warped Tour and opening for several more established bands.

The band then signed with Curve/Universal and released another album, Fear of Falling Skies, in late 2007. After the recording of Fear of Falling Skies, Mike Goreski left the band to pursue outside interests. He was replaced by Ethan Osland. In support of their recordings, in 2008 the band toured and performed in Europe with Ignite, Terror, Strung Out, Death Before Dishonor, and The Misfits. They have also performed with Ignite, Death By Stereo, and Bad Religion.

Throughout 2001 to 2008 Burnthe8track toured extensively in over 30 countries, and was featured on Definitely Not the Opera on CBC Radio, in a story about their quest to get their music video "Buried Beneath Us" shot and played on MuchMusic. Three of their songs were featured in ESPN NHL 2K5. Their music has been used in several TV shows throughout the years and the band also released three videos which have aired on MTV2, MTV Europe, VIVA, and Much Music.

Derek Kun is currently an actor. Jason Kun is an architect. Since 2011, Ethan Osland has been an instrument technician for Dallas Smith and Counting Crows; Sam Osland has been the stage manager for Counting Crows.

== Discography ==
- The Ocean (June 1, 2004)
- Division (EP) (2003, released in Europe 2008)
- Fear of Falling Skies (May 29, 2007)
