= Past Our Means =

Past Our Means EP

EP by Ignite
- Released: September 13, 1996
- Recorded: April 22 – 26, 1996; Paramount Studios, California, U.S.
- Genre: Hardcore punk
- Length: 14:02
- Label: Revelation Records
- Producers: Jim Goodwin; Ignite

Ignite chronology
Ignite / Good Riddance (1996)	Past Our Means EP (1996)	Straight Ahead (1997)

Past Our Means is a six track EP by Californian hardcore punk Ignite. It was released on September 13, 1996 on Revelation Records. It follows the previous year's full-length album Call On My Brothers.

== Overview ==
Ignite, at the time of this EP, played melodic hardcore, heavily influenced by bands like Government Issue and No For An Answer – not least because of Zoli Teglas' vocal style and patterns. Short, fast-paced songs punctuated only by the stomping mid-tempo of "In Defense". Lyrically, most songs tackle subjects such as loyalty, society, and general strife. However, on the final track, "Taken Away", Teglas draws on his experiences in his Hungarian homeland.

== Track listing ==
- All songs written by Ignite
1. "Holding On" – 2:02
2. "Past Our Means" – 2:23
3. "In Defense" – 3:00
4. "Embrace" – 2:22
5. "Self-Made Man" – 1:20
6. "Taken Away" – 2:55

== Credits ==
- Zoli Teglas – vocals
- Joe D. Foster – guitar
- Brett Rasmussen – bass
- Casey Jones – drums
- Jim Goodwin – octave guitar on "Past Our Means"
- Recorded April 22 – 26, 1996 at Paramount Studios, California, USA
- Produced by Jim Goodwin and Ignite
- Recorded and mixed by Jim Goodwin
