= Ignite (band) =

American melodic hardcore band

- Ignite 2026 Osnabruck, Germany

Background information
- Origin: Orange County, California, U.S.
- Genre: Melodic hardcore
- Years active: 1993–present
- Labels: 93RPM, Abacus, Century Media, TVT, Revelation, Conversion, Lost & Found
- Members: Brett Rasmussen; Craig Anderson; Nik Hill; Eli Santana
- Past members: Zoltán "Zoli" Téglás; Brian Balchack; Casey Jones; Joe Foster; Joe Nelson; Randy Johnson; Gavin Oglesby; Kevin Kilkenny
- Website: ignitebandofficial.com

Ignite is an American melodic hardcore band from Orange County, California. Formed in 1993, their commercial breakthrough album, A Place Called Home, was released in 2000 on TVT Records. Prior to this release, they were well regarded among hardcore fans, thanks in part to constant touring and having visited over 40 countries.

Much of the band's music is socially and politically aware. Ignite actively supports, and has given proceeds to, organizations such as Earth First, Doctors Without Borders, Sea Shepherd, and Pacific Wildlife. Former lead singer Zoltán "Zoli" Téglás has taken account of such issues as environmental concerns and vegetarianism—common topics found on A Place Called Home. The legacy of Soviet Communism in Eastern Europe is another recurring theme, in part because of Teglas' Hungarian background.

== History ==
Brett Rasmussen and Joe D. Foster formed a band together in 1992, Joe Nelson and Gavin Oglesby joined in 1993. Gavin eventually brought in Casey Jones as drummer. The band's initial name was Fuse, with subsequent band names including Angerslave and Shade. After the first demo tape, featuring the songs "Ash Return," "Distance," "Slow," "Should Have Known," and "Far Away," Joe Nelson temporarily joined Quicksand as a roadie. Lost & Found Records offered Ignite the opportunity to release an LP in Europe and promised them a tour. They then went on tour alongside Slapshot in the summer of 1994. Ignite persuaded Foster to sing during the recording of their first album Scarred for Life, which came out the same year, but they were short of a singer for the tour. After several months of searching, they found the Zoltán "Zoli" Téglás.

Following the tour Ignite recorded the EP "In My Time" in early 1995 with the lineup of Téglás/Rasmussen/Foster/Jones. This was the beginning of the problems with Lost & Found, as Ignite left the master tapes behind in Germany. Ignite now had a new label in America, Conversion Records, which was also represented in Europe and headquartered in Berlin. When asked if Lost & Found would release the master tapes for release in the States, the Wedemark-based label reacted angrily and threatened to boycott Conversion, which would have meant the end of their European career. So Ignite gave the rights to the LP "Family" to Lost & Found. The album Call on My Brothers was subsequently released in America. It consisted of material from the European albums In My Time and Family, plus bonus tracks. Ignite then switched to the hardcore label Revelation and released the EP Past Our Means in the summer of 1996. This was followed by a tour of Japan and a festival tour in Europe with Millencolin and Madball. Ignite were named the third best live band of 1996 by VISIONS magazine. In April 1997, during the "Wonderland Festival Tour," drummer Casey Jones unexpectedly left the band. Scott Golley replaced them, and they toured Europe in the summer of 1997. Craig Anderson then joined the band as drummer.

The band then began their own side projects and searched for a new label. Founding member Joe D. Foster left and was replaced by Brian Balchack. After several tours, Ignite began recording A Place Called Home, which was released in 2000 on TVT Records in America. Since TVT was not represented in Europe, the album was released there on GUN/Supersonic. Damien Lynch of Punk News wrote about the album calling it “Brilliant.” Adding “I've heard a lot of punk music in my day, but this album is one of the most unique hardcore acts I've heard in a long time. During subsequent tours, the guitarist changed, eventually returning to Brian Balchack. A Place Called Home proved to be a success and led to the band's high level of recognition; among other things, the band played on the Persistence Tour in 2003. On the following tour, Ignite were supported by guitarists Nik Hill and Kevin Kilkenny, which meant another lineup change.

Parallel to Ignite, Zoltán "Zoli" Téglás and the other band members developed the project called Zoli (later California United). Under this name, they recorded songs that didn't fit the Ignite style and were more in the rock than hardcore genre. Zoli Band and California United quickly established their own followings. However, the side projects were discontinued due to a lack of time. Brett Rasmussen and Nik Hill also formed their own side project Nations Afire with former Rise Against guitarist, Chris Chasse.

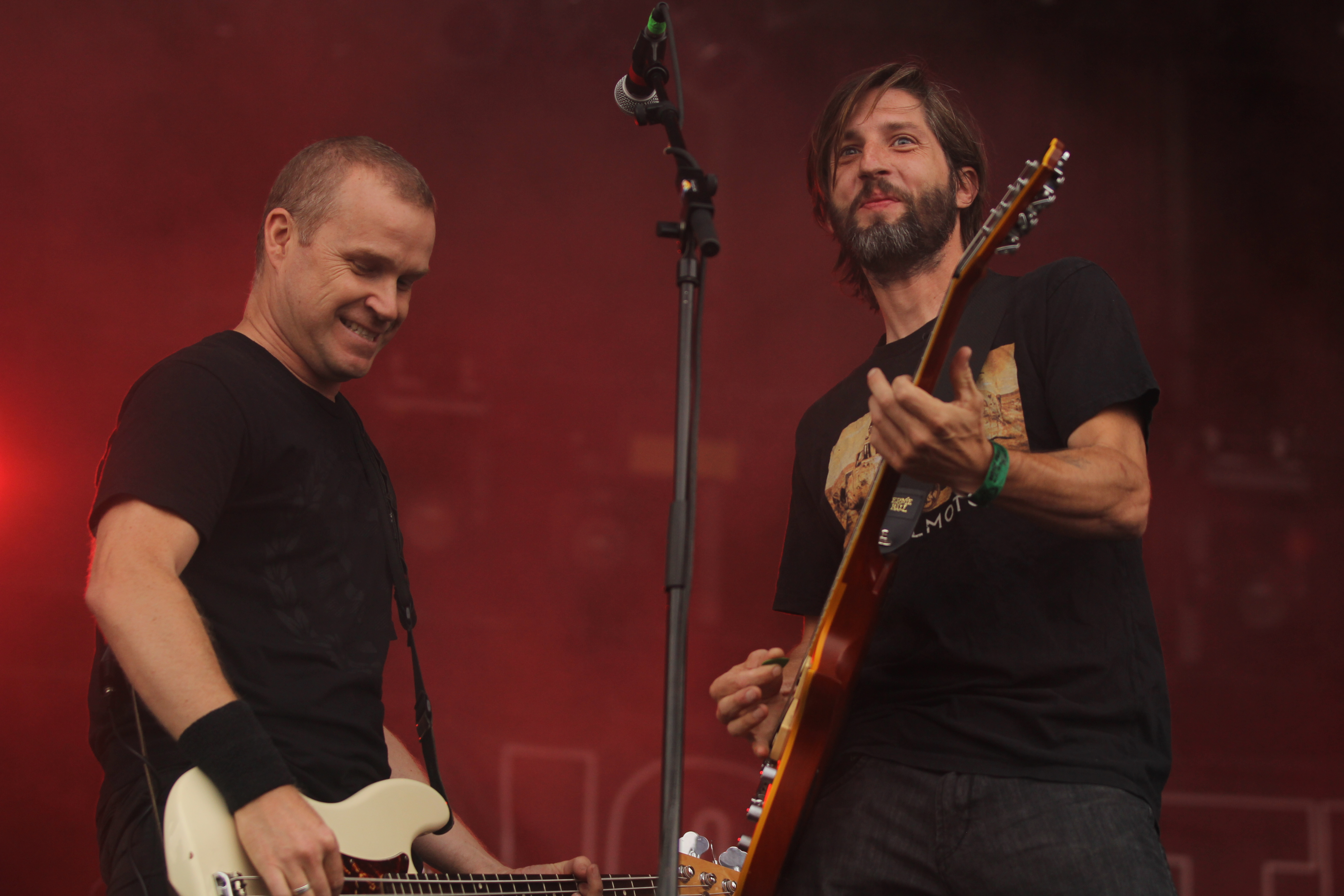
Ignite at Full Force Fest in 2014

On May 9, 2005, they filmed a live DVD at The Troubadour with A Dying Dream and Eightyonedays in West Hollywood, California. The DVD was never released due to some technical problems with the quality, but on April 20, 2008, they gathered footage for an upcoming live DVD of their show in Leipzig, Germany.

On July 20, 2005, a deal was announced with Abacus Recordings, a subsidiary label of Century Media Records; the band's album Our Darkest Days was released on the label in May 2006. Abucus of Scene Point Blank gave the album a personal score stating “Our Darkest Days is quite possibly Ignite's best work to date, and depending on your tastes, you may or may not agree. Vocalist Zoli Teglas sounds better than he ever has, showcasing an obvious step up in the quality of his singing since A Place Called Home.” Nik Hill left Ignite all together in 2006 and started up Lucky Scars.

The band toured in Europe in 2008. They headlined shows at Persistence Tour 2009. The Pennywise website, on February 16, 2010, announced that frontman Zoli Téglás just recently joined Pennywise. This resulted in the band doing off and on again tours throughout 2010-2012 then taking a complete hiatus in 2013.

The band eventually began touring with Zoli in 2014, and began recording the fifth album, A War Against You. It was later released In January 2016, and it reached number twelve in Germany, its first chart position. A War Against You also reached number 5 in Hungary, number 26 in the Austrian and number 55 in the Swiss album charts. The album also peaked at number 6 on the US Heatseekers Chart and 10 on the Hard Rock Charts. Arron from Scene Point Blank wrote “A War Against You seems to start off a little groggy, but eventually it finally wakes up. It could have gotten rid of a couple tracks, but ultimately they don't take away from anything great in the album. There's no doubt in my mind that A War Against You has found its own identity among the rest of Ignite's catalog and is a welcome addition. Ignite is back and better than ever.” The group then toured in support of the album in Europe along with a few North American shows.

Following a European tour lead singer Téglás announced his departure from the band in November 2019 to focus on personal projects. However, he announced that he would still participate in the already booked California tour in early 2020. His successor was Eli Santana, who is also active as a guitarist in the band Holy Grail.

On September 17, 2021, Ignite released a new EP which featured the debut of Santana. It featured two songs, "Anti Complicity Anthem" and "Turn XXI". In 2022 Ignite released their 6th studio album a self titled record. Hardbeat Magazine wrote that the album “doesn't really break the mould, but it should definitely leave listeners fired up and ready to make a change.” The band continued to tour in Europe into 2023.

In 2024, the band went on an East Coast tour along with Slapshot, Death by Stereo, and School Drugs. Later that same year, they toured Europe alongside Slapshot in celebration of the first time the two bands toured together in 1994.

On October 9, 2026 the band announced their seventh studio album, Still Wide Awake, to be release on January 12, 2027 via the band's newly founded independent record label, 93RPM Records.

== Style ==
The band's style is based on the typical melodic so-called West Coast hardcore and Melodic Hardcore. The band is one of the most important representatives of this style today. Allmusic describes their music as "melodic hardcore with a social and political consciousness."

== Members ==
Ignite live at With Full Force 2019

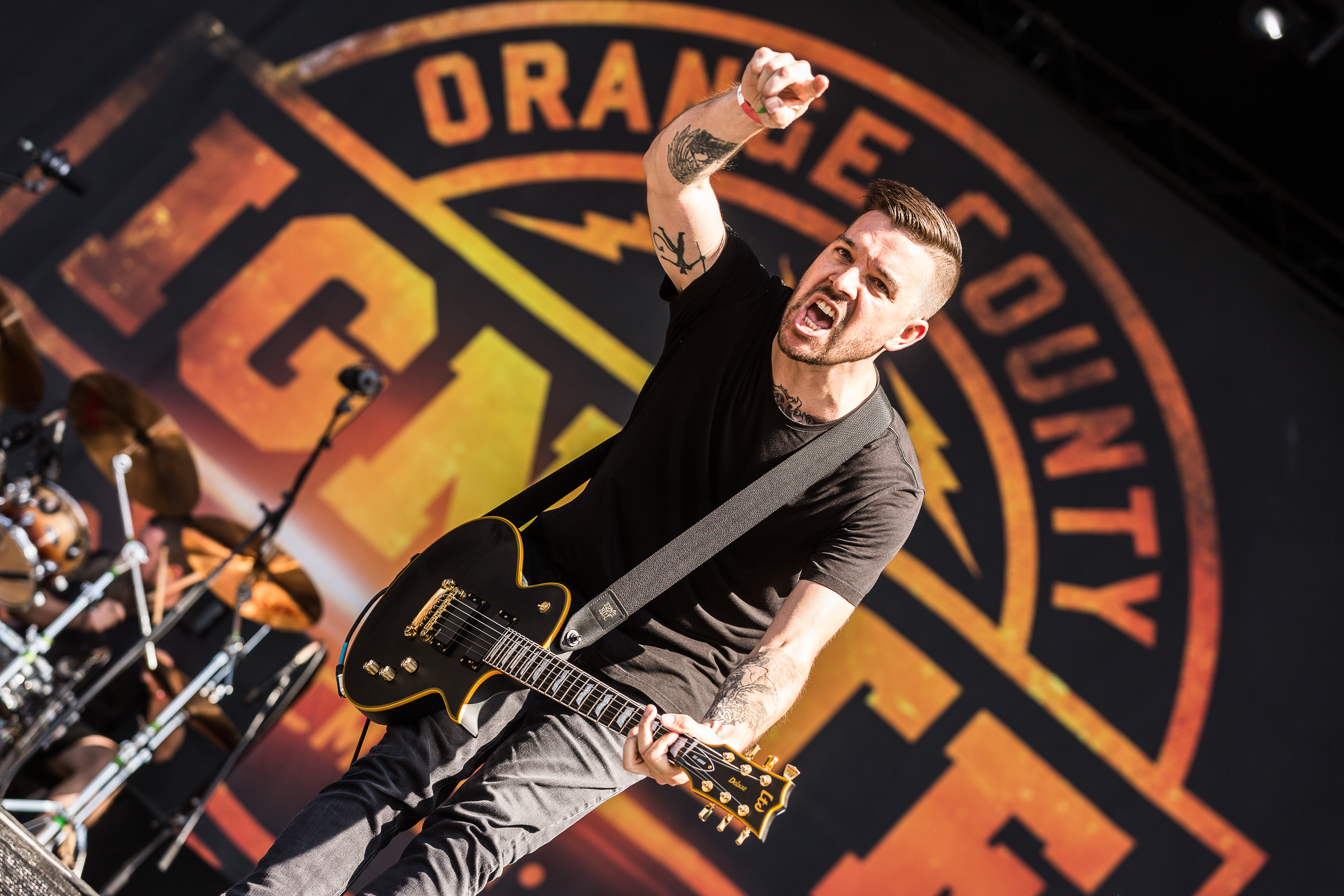
Nik Hill

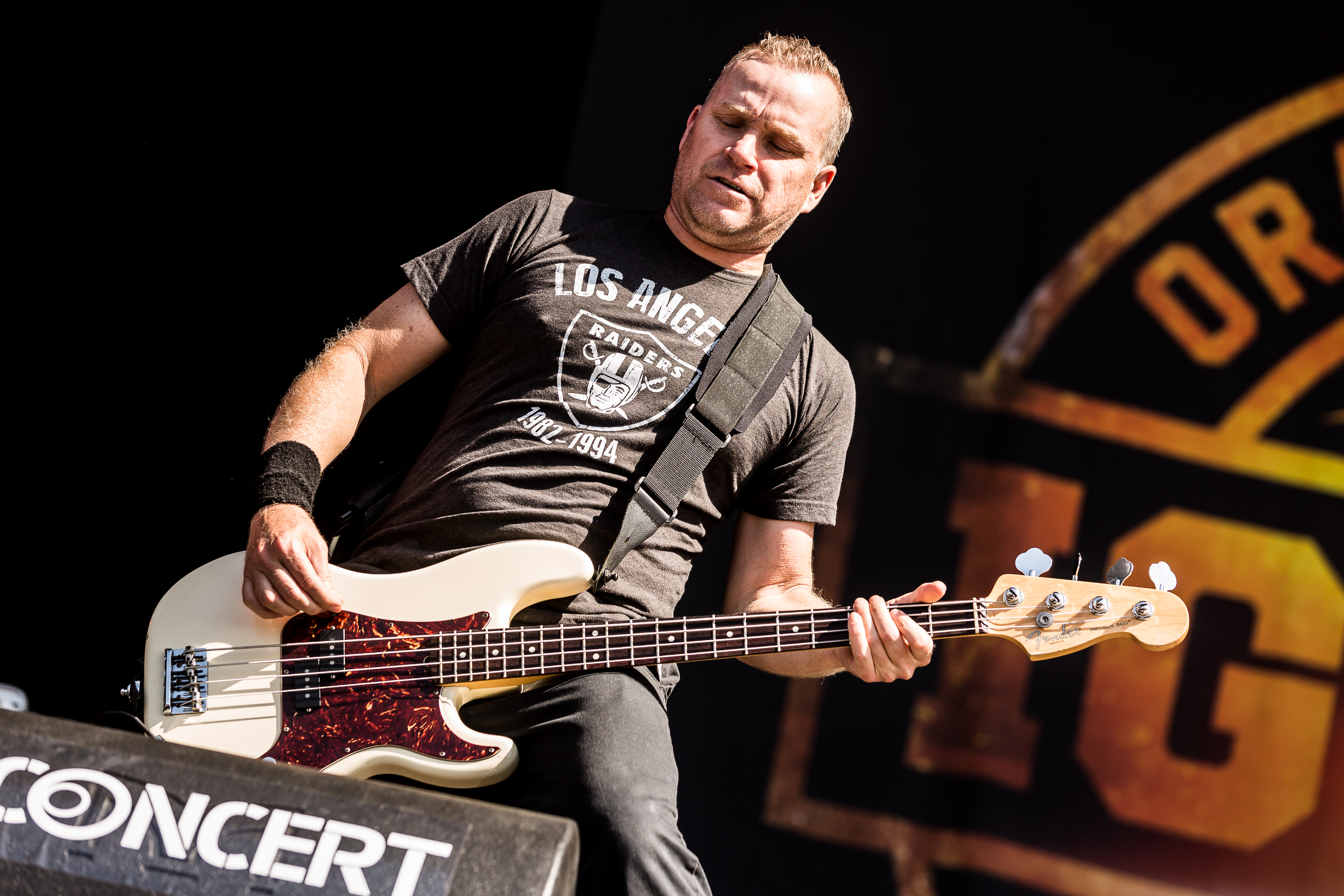
Brett Rasmussen

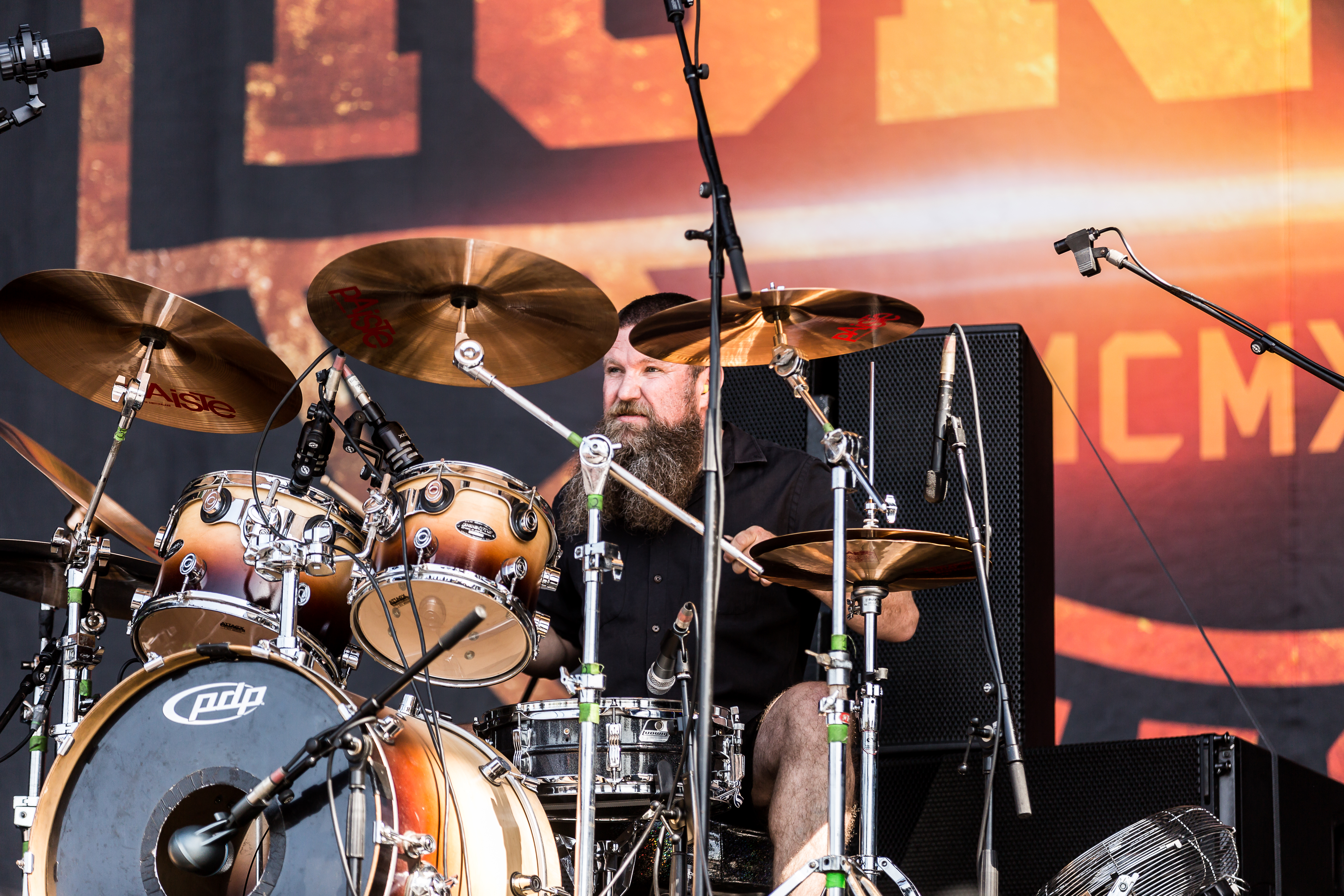
Craig Anderson

=== Current members ===
- Brett Rasmussen – bass (1993–present)
- Craig Anderson – drums (1997–present)
- Nik Hill – guitar (2000, 2003, 2005–2015, 2018–present)
- Eli Santana – vocals (2020–present)

=== Previous members ===
- Joe Nelson – vocals (1993–1994)
- Joe Foster – guitar (1993–1998)
- Casey Jones – drums (1993–1997)
- Randy Johnson – vocals (1994)
- Zoli Téglás – vocals (1994–2019)
- Brian Balchack – guitar (1998–2000, 2005–2019)
- Kevin Kilkenny – guitar (2000–2003, 2007–2015, 2018–2024)

== Discography ==
=== Studio albums ===
- Scarred for Life (1994) - Lost & Found Records
- Family (1995) - Lost & Found Records (European version of Call On My Brothers, Conversion Records)
- A Place Called Home (2000) - TVT Records
- Our Darkest Days (2006) - Abacus Recordings (US), Century Media Records (Europe)
- A War Against You (2016) - Century Media Records
- Ignite (2022) - Century Media Records
- Still Wide Awake (2027) - 93RPM Records

=== Other releases ===
- Where They Talk EP (1994) Ringside Records
- Slapshot / Ignite split (1994) Lost & Found Records
- Battery / Ignite split (1994) Lost & Found Records
- In My Time EP (1995) Lost & Found Records
- Ignite / Good Riddance split (1996) Revelation Records
- Past Our Means EP (1996) Revelation Records
- Straight Ahead (1997) Rovers Records
- Ignite / X-Acto split (1997) Ataque Sonoro Records
- Sea Shepherd Conservation Society EP (1999) Vacation House Records

=== Compilation appearances ===
- Punk Bites (1996) Fearless Records
- Guilty by Association (1995)
- West Coast vs. East Coast Hardcore (1995)
- As The Sun Sets... (1999) The Association Of Welterweights
- Never Give In: A Tribute to Bad Brains (1999) Century Media Records
- Punk Chunks Vol. 2 (2002) Lameass Recordz
- Revelation 100: A Fifteen Year Retrospective of Rare Recordings (2002) Revelation Records
- The Worldwide Tribute to the Real Oi Vol. 2 (2002) I Scream/Knockout/Triple Crown
- Our Impact Will Be Felt (2007) Abacus Recordings
