= A Place Called Home (album) =

Studio album by Ignite
- Released: June 13, 2000
- Genre: Melodic hardcore
- Label: TVT
- Producer: Thom Wilson; Zoli Téglás

Ignite chronology
Straight Ahead (1997)	A Place Called Home (2000)	Our Darkest Days (2006)

A Place Called Home is the third full-length album by Californian hardcore punk band Ignite. The record was first released on June 13, 2000, and released in Europe in February 2001 to coincide with the band participating in the Vans Club Tour that same month.

== Track listing ==
1. "Who Sold Out Now?"
2. "Veteran"
3. "Fill In The Blanks"
4. "Burned Up"
5. "No Regrets"
6. "Run"
7. "Bullets Included No Thought Required"
8. "A Place Called Home"
9. "Hands On Stance"
10. "By My Side"
11. "In Moderation"
12. "Pieter"
13. "I'm Bored"/ "A Place Called Home" (Hungarian version)

European version Tracks 1–12 same as original release.

13. "I'm Bored"
14. "Sunday Bloody Sunday" (U2)
15. "Old"
16. "A Place Called Home" (Hungarian) (*hidden track)
