= Scarred for Life (Ignite album) =

Studio album by Ignite
- Released: August 1, 1994
- Recorded: Moonsong Studios, Riverside, California
- Genre: Melodic hardcore
- Length: 25:06
- Label: Lost & Found Records

Ignite chronology
Scarred for Life (1994)	Family (1995)

Scarred for Life is the debut album by Californian melodic hardcore band Ignite.

== Track listing ==
1. Automatic (3:16)
2. Slow (2:01)
3. Where They Talk (2:12)
4. Shade (3:10)
5. Turn (2:15)
6. Ash Return (3:47)
7. Should Have Known (3:30)
8. Scarred for Life (4:55)

== Credits ==
- Brett Rasmussen — Bass
- Casey Jones — Drums
- Joe D. Foster — Guitar
- Joe Nelson — vocals on tracks 6 to 8
- Randy Johnson — vocals on tracks 1 to 5
- Bob Moon — Engineer
