= The Joshua Tree Tours 2017 and 2019 =

Concert tours by U2 in 2017 and 2019

- World tour by U2
- Location: Asia; Europe; North America; Oceania; South America
- Associated album: The Joshua Tree (30th anniversary)
- Start date: 12 May 2017; 8 November 2019
- End date: 25 October 2017; 15 December 2019
- Legs: 4 (2017); 1 (2019)
- No. of shows: 51 (2017); 15 (2019)
- Attendance: 3,279,712
- Box office: $390.8 million

U2 concert chronology
- Innocence + Experience Tour (2015); The Joshua Tree Tour 2017 (2017); Experience + Innocence Tour (2018)
Experience + Innocence Tour (2018)	The Joshua Tree Tour 2019 (2019)	U2:UV Achtung Baby Live at Sphere (2023–2024)

The Joshua Tree Tour 2017 and The Joshua Tree Tour 2019 were two worldwide concert tours by the Irish rock band U2 commemorating the 30th anniversary of their 1987 album The Joshua Tree. The 2017 tour visited stadiums over four legs: North America from May to July and in September, Europe from July to August, and Latin America in October. The 2019 tour visited Oceania and Asia in November and December, marking the band's first ever concerts in South Korea, Singapore, the Philippines, and India. The band played the whole Joshua Tree album during the concerts, which included their first live performances of the song "Red Hill Mining Town". It was the first time the group toured in promotion of an album from their back catalogue, rather than a new release. As part of the tour, U2 headlined the Bonnaroo Music Festival in Manchester, Tennessee, in June 2017.

U2 originally wanted to play a set of one-off shows in the US and Europe to commemorate the 30th anniversary of The Joshua Tree, but ultimately decided to stage a full concert tour instead. The band cited world events, such as the 2016 US presidential election, for what they perceived to be renewed resonance of the album's subject matter and a reason to revisit it. The stage featured a 7.6K resolution video screen measuring 200 ft × 45 ft (61 m × 14 m), making it the largest and highest resolution video screen of any concert tour, according to The Guardian. A silhouette of the Joshua tree from the album sleeve was painted on the screen, while a Joshua tree–shaped B-stage represented the plant's shadow. Photographer Anton Corbijn, who photographed the album sleeve, provided films that accompanied performances of the album's songs.

Initially, some critics interpreted the announcement of an anniversary tour to be an acknowledgment by U2 that they had become a legacy act, although the band rejected any characterisations of nostalgia. They instead strove to make the shows feel forward-looking and debuted two new songs that would later be released on their album Songs of Experience in December 2017. After their Experience + Innocence Tour in 2018, the group incorporated elements from it into the encore of the Joshua Tree Tour 2019. The tours received positive reviews from critics, with praise for the performances, production, and setlist. The 2017 tour grossed $317 million, making it the year's highest-grossing tour globally, and it sold more than 2.71 million tickets to its 51 shows. In 2019, the band grossed $73.8 million and sold 567,000 tickets from 15 shows, bringing the two tours' cumulative gross to $390.8 million from 3.3 million tickets sold.

== Conception ==
The inspiration for the tour came in August 2016, during show production rehearsals for U2's headlining appearances at the iHeartRadio Music Festival and Salesforce's Dreamforce conference. Initially, the band were interested in marking the 30th anniversary of their 1987 album, The Joshua Tree, with one show in the United States and Europe each, but they eventually decided to expand it into a full tour. The band members gave various reasons for the tour. Lead vocalist Bono said, "it was just to honor this album that meant so much to us" and that at first there was no "grand concept". However, once they realised the record was still relevant thematically, "the thing just ran away with itself". Guitarist the Edge cited the 2016 US presidential election and other world events for what he judged to be renewed resonance of The Joshua Tree's subject matter. He said, "things have kind of come full circle, if you want. That record was written in the mid-Eighties, during the Reagan–Thatcher era of British and U.S. politics. It was a period when there was a lot of unrest. Thatcher was in the throes of trying to put down the miners' strike; there was all kinds of shenanigans going on in Central America. It feels like we're right back there in a way. I don't think any of our work has ever come full circle to that extent. It just felt like, 'Wow, these songs have a new meaning and a new resonance today that they didn't have three years ago, four years ago.'"

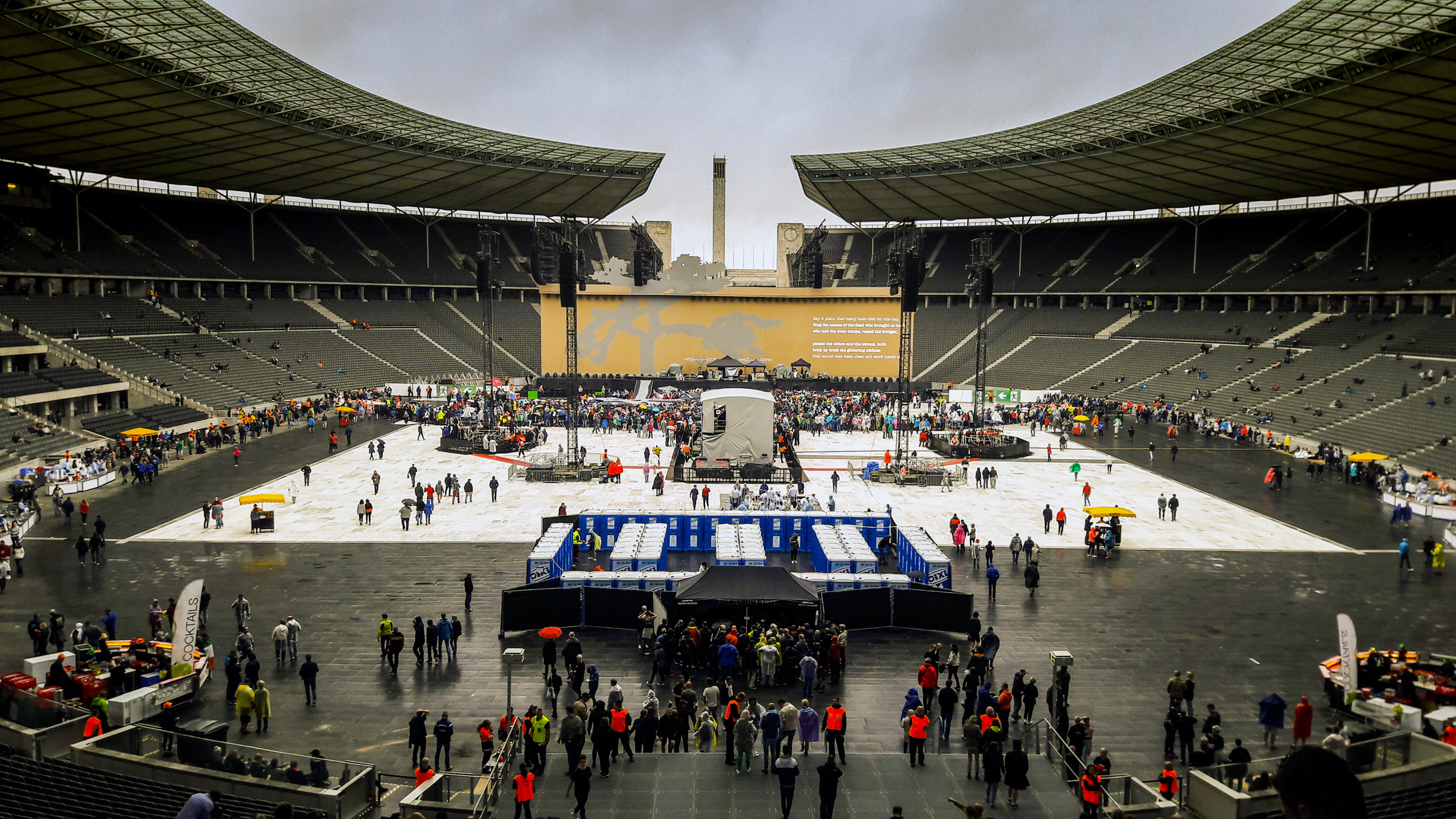
The stage as seen prior to a 12 July 2017 show in Berlin. It was designed using the stage from the band's original Joshua Tree Tour as a reference point.

Longtime U2 set designer Willie Williams said that there was a misconception that "because of the nature of the show, the staging could be very simple, which meant it would be achievable with a reduced lead time". He rejected the notion that the stage would be simple but did realise that much of the lead time required for U2 tours is spent defining the ideas behind them. With The Joshua Tree's anniversary as the idea, the development process was simplified, as the band and their creative team were able to begin with several assumptions: that half of the concerts' set list would consist of The Joshua Tree songs; that they could use the original Joshua Tree Tour stage as a reference point; and that photographer Anton Corbijn, who shot the photographs from the album sleeve, would create video content. In October 2016, the band began initial conversations with Stufish Entertainment Architects, the firm behind the set design.

Williams said, "After talking over many possible approaches, we looked at the original Joshua Tree stadium stage and then allowed its bold, simple aesthetic to guide the design." On the original 1987 Joshua Tree Tour, the stadium stage was built on one end of the venue as a large proscenium, flanked on the sides by the sound system covered by gold scrims depicting black branches of a Joshua tree. Only at the largest North American stadiums was video reinforcement used, behind the front of house sound mixing station, but it was visible to only half the audience. Williams called the design "maximal minimalism". With concert production values having advanced since the original Joshua Tree Tour, he was initially drawn to returning to the simplicity of a "traditional festival stage", saying, "A proscenium stage is so out of fashion now that part of me wondered if U2 could do something interesting to reinvent it for the 21st century." However, he ultimately decided against that design for the anniversary tour, as it offers limited sightlines of 150–160 degrees within stadium seating. Instead, he said, "We took the spirit of that kind of minimal CinemaScope idea where the look was a huge stretched image of the Joshua Tree... and ran with it." Williams said using the original tour's stage for inspiration was a "get out of jail free card" for him, as he was not sure how he could follow up the extravagance of the stage he designed for the band's previous stadium tour, the U2 360° Tour of 2009–2011. Williams called the creative process "pedal to the metal for six months".

The first designs for the stage were presented by Stufish in December 2016. U2 expressed their preference for a large video screen similar to the one that Stufish and Williams built for the band's performance at the Dreamforce conference in October; that screen was an homage to the Geneva Drive-In Theater that previously stood on the site of the Cow Palace, where the conference was held. The band's creative team, which included stage designer Es Devlin initially as a creative consultant, were not excited by the idea of building a standard rectangular screen so the possibility of "exploding the frame was appealing", according to Williams. Their first ideas were to make the outer edges of the screen irregular. While reviewing design proposals in one of the band's creative meetings with Stufish and Williams in December, Bono drew an outline of a Joshua tree breaking through the top of the video screen. Lipson said, "At that point, we didn't know what the kit would be, beyond the hope that technology just on the cusp of being possible would be invented in time for the start of the tour in May." To see their ideas through to fruition, the band and the creative team traveled to Lititz, Pennsylvania, the site of the corporate campus of Tait Towers, the architectural engineering company behind many music tours. Ultimately, the tour concept was finalized in February 2017.

Corbijn enlisted cinematographer Sebastian Wintero to film video content for the tour. The duo used Arri Rental's Alexa 65 camera, since it captured resolutions higher than 6K but was easy enough to operate that it did not interfere in the creative process. The duo shot in a special 4.5:1 wide aspect ratio, filming mostly single takes of limited action that could play during concerts for 5–6 minutes. Due to Corbijn's experience with black-and-white photography and the camera's features, the duo were able to instantaneously color grade and design lookup tables, allowing them to experiment with various looks for the footage as they shot.

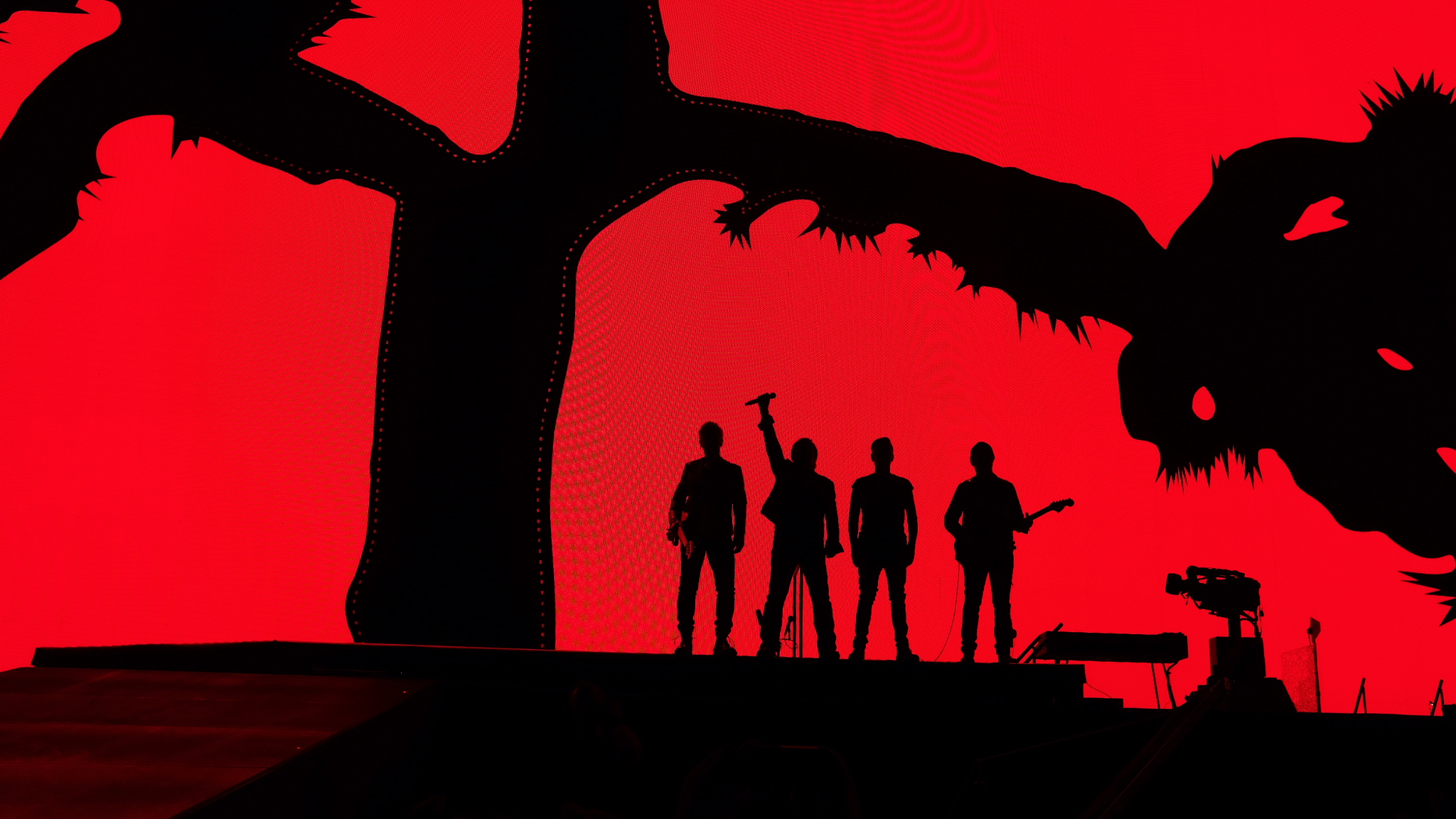
U2 preparing to play "Where the Streets Have No Name", commencing a sequential performance of The Joshua Tree in Kansas City on 12 September 2017. The band felt challenged in structuring the set list for the tour.

Despite knowing they would be performing songs from The Joshua Tree, U2 felt challenged in structuring the set list. Bassist Adam Clayton said, "People react a little differently when they know what's coming next, and they also react a little differently when they're having an internal relationship with that particular running order". Early in the creative process, Williams presented eight set list options to the band. These included: playing The Joshua Tree songs first; playing them last; playing them in the middle; playing songs in chronological order of their release; and grouping songs thematically. According to Williams, there were never internal discussions of breaking up the album into sections. The group considered starting shows with the album, but this would have meant leading with the song "Where the Streets Have No Name", which is usually the climax of a U2 concert. Williams also noted that it would still be daylight at the beginning of shows in Europe. Another challenge in structuring the set list was that the second half of The Joshua Tree is "relatively downbeat". Ultimately, the band chose a three-act format, with the album in the middle.

Despite honouring a 30-year-old album with the tour, U2 and their creative team rejected characterisations of the venture as "nostalgic", as they wanted it to feel forward looking and the band wanted to perform at least one new song. To aid in this, the team decided against showing archival footage of the band from their younger days in the visuals. They also decided that due to the older age of the band members and the size of the video screen, close-up shots of them would be limited.

== Planning, itinerary, and ticketing ==
=== 2017 concerts ===
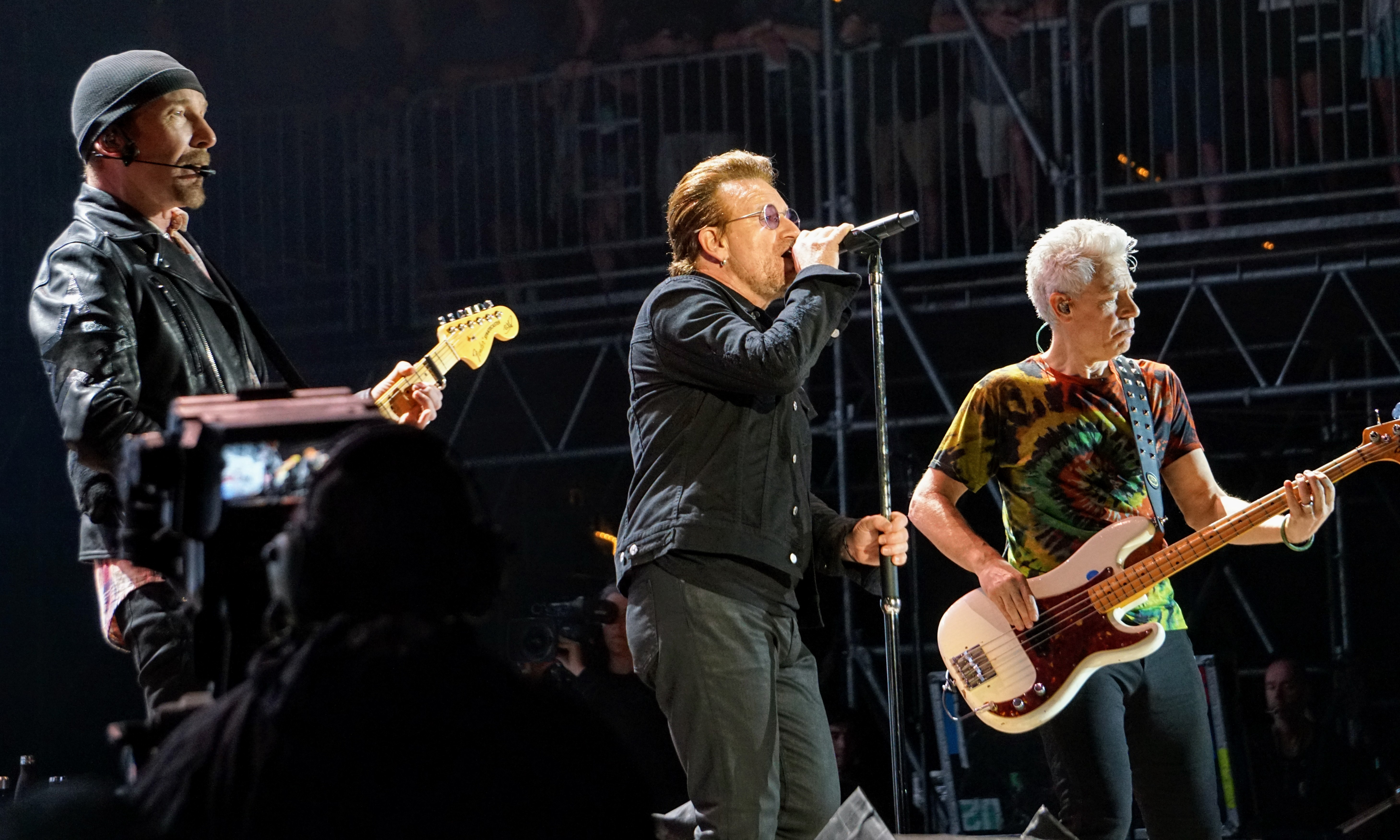
The tour's itinerary included a performance at the Bonnaroo Music Festival in June 2017.

The tour was announced on 9 January 2017, initially consisting of a North American leg from May to July and a European leg from July to August. It was the first time the group toured in promotion of an album from their back catalogue, rather than a new release. Kyle McGovern of Pitchfork interpreted the tour announcement to be an admission by U2 that they were entering the "nostalgia act" phase of their career. He said, "this tour announcement feels like it's coming from a U2 that's ready to put their work behind glass, as so many of their peers did far earlier... And there's no shame in that..." Pre-sale tickets were first offered to U2.com subscribers starting on 11 January before going on sale to the general public on 16 January (for European shows) and 17 January (for North American shows). Approximately 1.1 million tickets were sold in the first 24 hours of being on sale. After tickets for the tour sold out quickly, second shows were added in London, Rome, Paris, Amsterdam, East Rutherford, Pasadena, and Chicago. As part of the tour's itinerary, U2 headlined the Bonnaroo Music Festival in Manchester, Tennessee, in June.

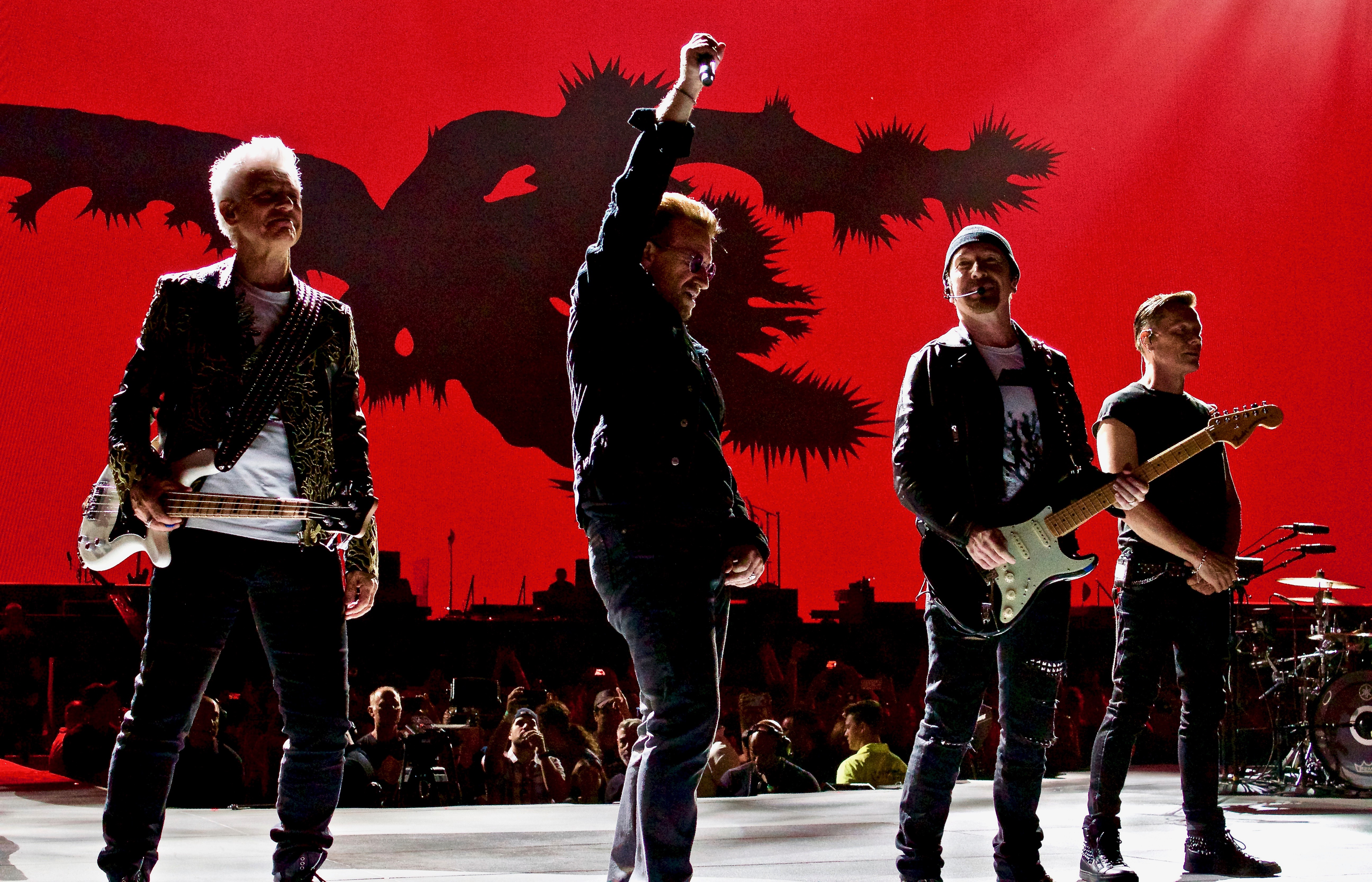
U2 performing in Kansas City in September 2017, one of several North American dates that was added due to the success of the tour.

Additional dates for the tour were announced on 6 June 2017, halfway through the opening leg; a second North American leg was added to the itinerary for September 2017, initially consisting of seven dates, while a Latin American leg initially consisting of five dates was added for October. Tickets for these legs were offered to U2.com subscribers in a pre-sale starting 8 June, while public sales began on 12 June for North America and 14 June for Latin America. In the weeks after the tour's extension was announced, the band added a show in New Orleans scheduled for 14 September, a show in Glendale scheduled for 19 September, and extra shows in Mexico City, La Plata, and São Paulo. Tour production director Jake Berry said the second North American leg was not originally planned and that the group were scheduled to have a two-month break between the European leg and the Latin American leg. However, since the tour was a "success... beyond everybody's wildest dreams", the group added North American dates in September and shortened their break to four weeks.

In North America and Europe, the tour used a paperless ticket system requiring concert attendees to present the credit card they used to purchase tickets as well as a photo ID upon entry at the venue. The measures were meant to combat ticket resellers. However, on the tour's opening night in Vancouver on 12 May 2017, attendees faced long queues to enter BC Place; some fans missed the performance of opening act Mumford & Sons. Live Nation officials blamed the delays on a mix-up regarding which gates at the stadium would accept paperless tickets. To recompense affected concertgoers, Ticketmaster offered $50 gift cards for use against future events, while BC Place offered free attendance to a Vancouver Whitecaps FC or BC Lions sporting event with a $20 food/beverage voucher.

According to Music Generation, an Irish music education programme for children, some of U2's earnings from the tour benefited the programme, allowing it to expand to nine new areas in the country within five years. The band also donated a portion of its Mexico City earnings to a relief fund benefiting victims of the 2017 Central Mexico earthquake.

In the wake of terrorist attacks across Europe, Ireland's police force deployed its Armed Support Units to act as "terrorist spotters" at U2's show in Dublin.

Due to safety concerns caused by the 2017 St. Louis protests, the tour's 16 September show in St. Louis was canceled earlier that day. In a joint statement, U2 and Live Nation said, "We have been informed by the St. Louis Police Department that they are not in a position to provide the standard protection for our audience as would be expected for an event of this size."

=== 2019 concerts ===
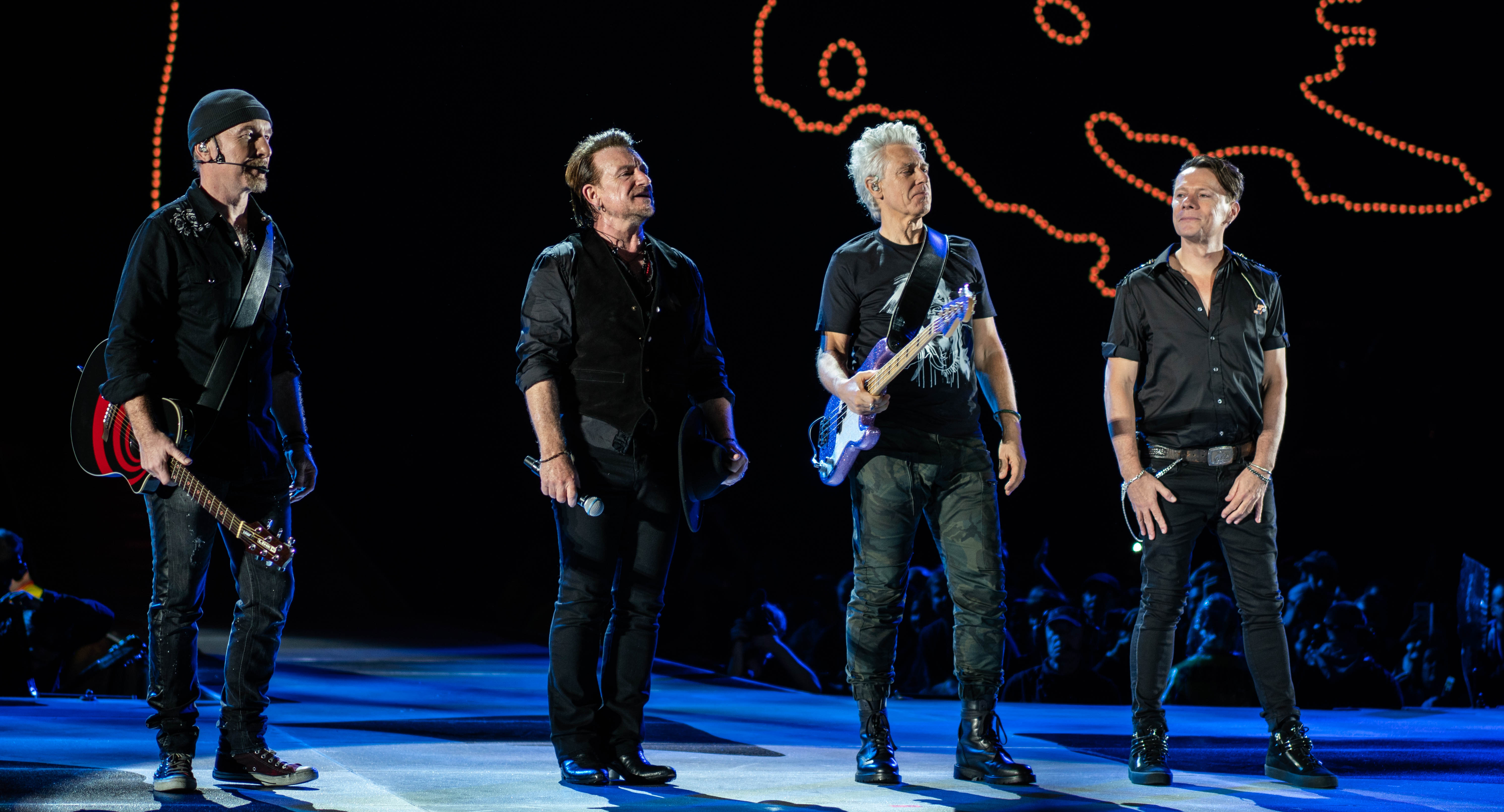
U2 performing in Sydney in November 2019. The leg of the tour was the band's first visit to Australia since 2010.

On 31 May 2019, U2 announced an extension to the tour with an Oceanian and Asian leg later in the year. It commenced with concerts in Australia and New Zealand in November, the band's first time performing in either country since the 360° Tour in 2010. From late November through December, the tour travelled to Asia. The group's initial announcement confirmed their first ever performances in South Korea and Singapore, and included nine concert dates; the date and venue for their visit to Singapore were not finalised until 14 June, when it was announced U2 would perform on 30 November at the National Stadium. After tickets for the Sydney, Auckland, and Singapore shows went on sale, second concerts were announced for each city due to high demand.

On 30 July, the band announced the addition of a 11 December concert in the Philippines, their first ever show in the country. Ticket pre-sales for that concert were available to U2.com subscribers from 1–3 September and Smart Communications subscribers on 4 September, before general public sales began on 5 September through SM Tickets.

On 18 September, U2 announced the addition of a 15 December concert in Mumbai to conclude the tour, marking their first ever show in India. Ticket pre-sales for that concert were available to U2.com subscribers from 24 to 25 September and PhonePe subscribers from 26 to 29 September, before general public sales began on 1 October. Tickets were offered for purchase by BookMyShow, which partnered with Live Nation Global Touring to bring the band to India. Billboard said that securing a U2 concert in India was a signifier of the country's growing appeal as a touring destination for high-profile Western acts. U2 had long wanted to perform in India but were never able to due to "logistical and infrastructure challenges" and prohibitive production costs. According to Billboard, top international acts usually only performed in India if they were already touring in the region, as standalone concerts were not financially feasible. Arthur Fogel of Live Nation said that one of the factors in finally bringing U2 to India was that they were already "going to Southeast Asia, and there was the ability to add on a week at the end to accommodate Mumbai". On 22 November, the band released a new single, "Ahimsa", with Indian musician A.R. Rahman to promote their concert in India.

During their 4 December concert in Saitama, the band announced "U2X Radio", a dedicated U2 radio channel that launched for SiriusXM subscribers and Pandora Radio users in 2020. The announcement preceded a performance of "Elevation", which was streamed on Facebook Live.

== Stage design and show production ==
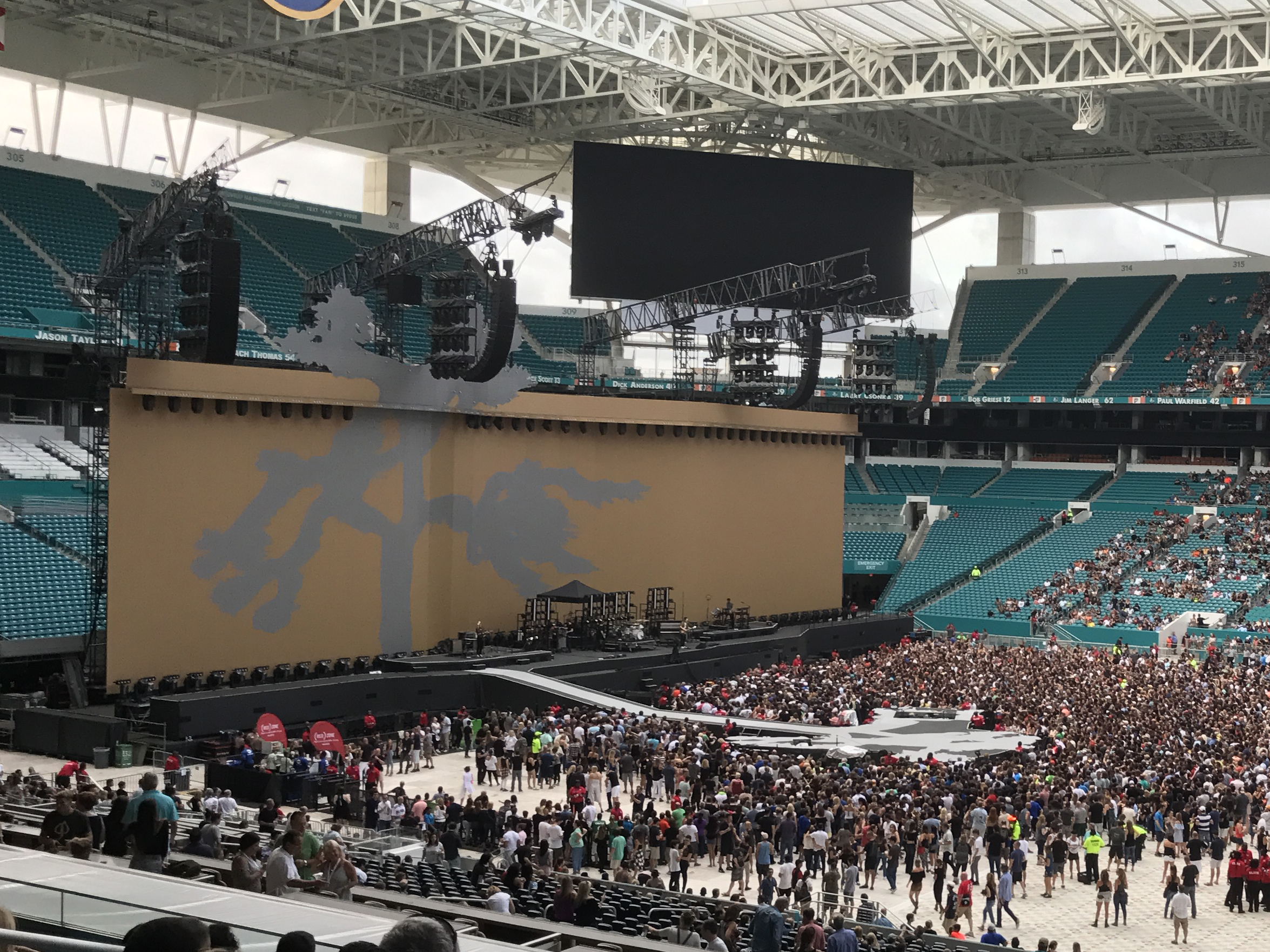
The stage prior to a show at the Hard Rock Stadium in Miami Gardens, Florida on 11 June 2017

The set was designed by Stufish Entertainment Architects and built by Tait Towers. Willie Williams provided creative direction for the firms and served as the tour's lighting director. The 192-foot-wide (59 m) stage was fabricated by Tait and supported by a 900 mm (35 in) sub-deck built by Stageco. A 120-foot-long (37 m) thrust extended from the main stage and connected to a 55-foot-wide (17 m) B-stage shaped like a Joshua tree; it represented the shadow of a tree that appeared on the video screen. The B-stage featured two lifts that could lower a keyboard and drum kit below the stage for better sightlines of the band when they performed on the main stage.

It utilised a touring frame design called "SPACEFRAME" that was created by Production Resource Group (PRG), which has been involved in each U2 tour since their Zoo TV Tour in 1992. The SPACEFRAME system was made of carbon fibre and was designed to be lightweight, collapsible, and fully wind braced. U2 were PRG's first client for the product, which was delivered from prototype to final product in 17 weeks. As a result of the system's smaller profile, the band were able to reduce the number of trucks required to transport the framing system; a PRG press release claimed a reduction from seven to three trucks, while a Popular Mechanics article said the final tally of trucks was four, saving $225,000.

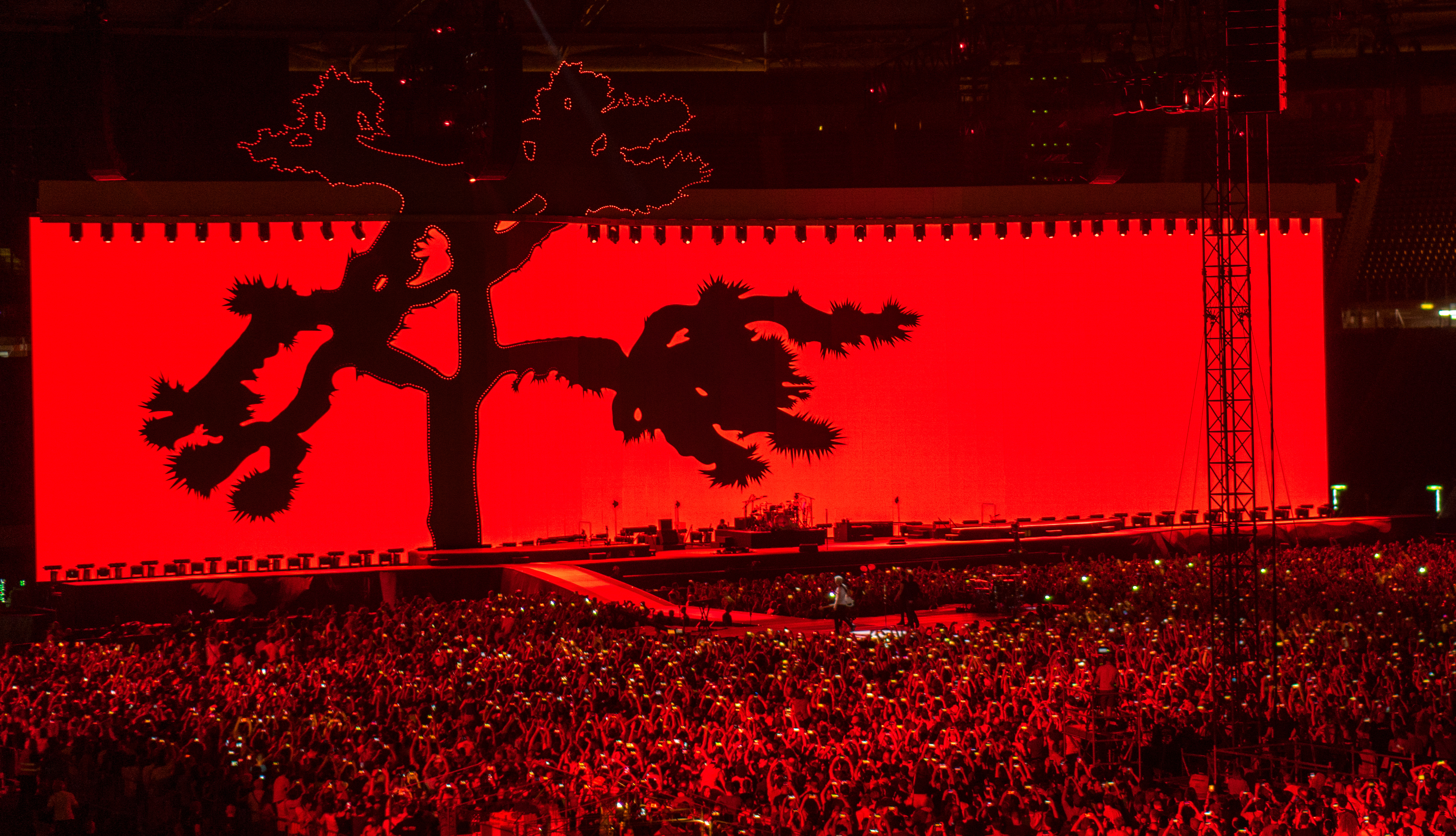
The video screen, seen during the band's 16 July 2017 performance in Rome. It measured 200 feet wide by 45 feet high and had a resolution of 7,200 by 1,560 pixels, making it the largest and highest resolution video screen of any concert tour.

The SPACEFRAME system was used to build an LED video screen measuring 200 feet (61 m) wide by 45 feet (14 m) high. The screen comprised 1,040 individual ROE Visual CB8 LED video panels with an 8 mm (0.31 in) pixel pitch. The screen had a resolution of 7,200 × 1,560 pixels. According to The Guardian, it was the largest and highest resolution video screen used on a concert tour. Williams said it was similar in size to the one used on the band's 1997–1998 PopMart Tour but 400 times the resolution. A "delicate curve" in the screen gave what he described as the illusion of the visuals appearing 3D.

For the 2017 shows, the video screen was painted gold with a silver silhouette of a Joshua tree, tying it to the colour schemes of The Joshua Tree album sleeve and the original tour's stage design. The creative team also chose the colour scheme because they wanted to eschew the standard black colour of an LED screen and instead "own this slab of video as an object, not just a screen", according to Ric Lipson of Stufish. A 30-foot-high (9.1 m) scenic header extended from the top of the video screen, completing the plant's silhouette. Lipson said that the screen "look[ed] like a piece of golden cardboard with a sprayed on silver tree". To paint the screen, extensive effort was required to first disassemble the video panels. Each one comprised eight smaller tiles, each of which was covered by a black "shader", which Lipson described as a "louvered plastic piece" that shielded the LED panel from sunlight to help with contrast. The shaders were removed and replaced with custom gray ones that had been painted gold and silver. To replace the shaders, about 1.5 million screws were removed and re-inserted, a process that had to be repeated after the tour to reinstall the original black shaders so the rented video panels could be put back into storage. Shaders were also installed on the scenic header above the video screen to give the tree silhouette a consistent appearance. For the 2019 shows, the crew opted instead to render the tree silhouette through video, as it would not have been cost effective to reinstall the painted shaders on rented equipment for a shorter tour halfway across the world.

PRG provided the tour's 4K (UHD) Broadcast Camera System, the first time it was used on a concert tour. A combination of several products, it connected cameras and LED wall processors via optical fibre cable, a necessity due to the large amount of data transferred and the long distance over which it needed to travel. Designed to operate at the highest broadcast standards, the system provided video at 60 frames per second at a resolution of 3,840 × 2,160 pixels. The broadcast system could be assembled in an hour and be operated by a single video engineer. A terabyte of video was broadcast on the video screen every minute.

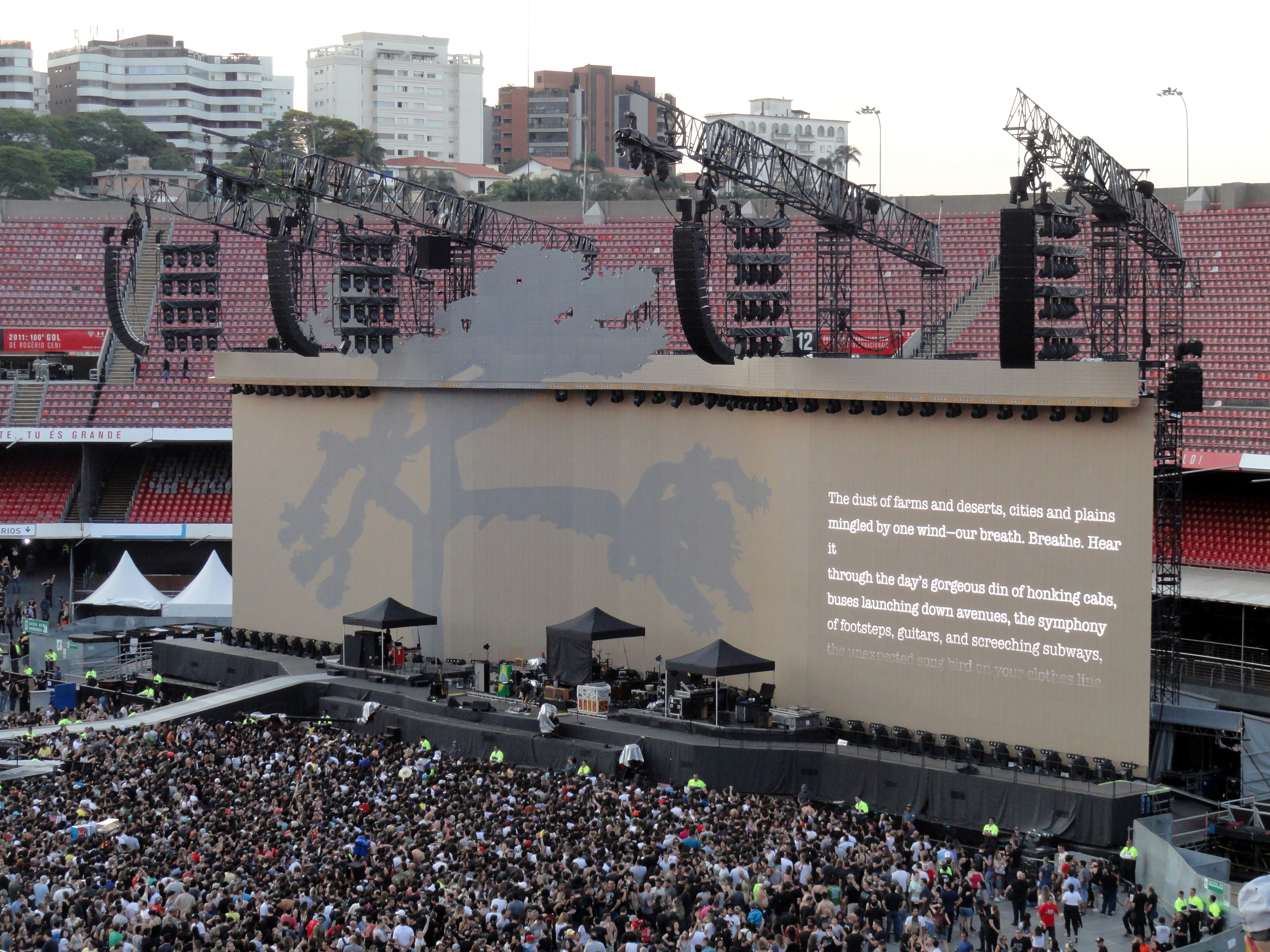
The lighting and sound systems were cantilevered over the video screen to eliminate any obstructions in front of it.

The lighting and sound systems were cantilevered over the video screen from behind on four towers custom built by Stageco, removing any obstructions in front of the screen. The design was suggested by production manager Jake Berry and sound designer Joe O'Herlihy. Lipson said, "We wanted to create a vast background behind the band that would be completely unobscured and pure." For the sound system, 16 Clair Global Cohesion CO-12 speaker cabinets were hung from each cantilever for a total of 64 cabinets. The lowest cabinet was 53 feet (16 m) from the stage, and the left and right channel speakers were 84 feet (26 m) apart. For front fill, 16 Cohesion CO-8 speakers were hung from the front elevation of the stage and B-stage ramp, while 32 Cohesion CP-218 subwoofers were located at ground level for bass. Four towers of time-delayed speakers were built behind the front of house mixing station in an arc formation, two with eight CO-12 speakers each, and two with six CO-12 speakers each. O'Herlihy operated a DiGiCo SD7 digital mixing console at the front of house.

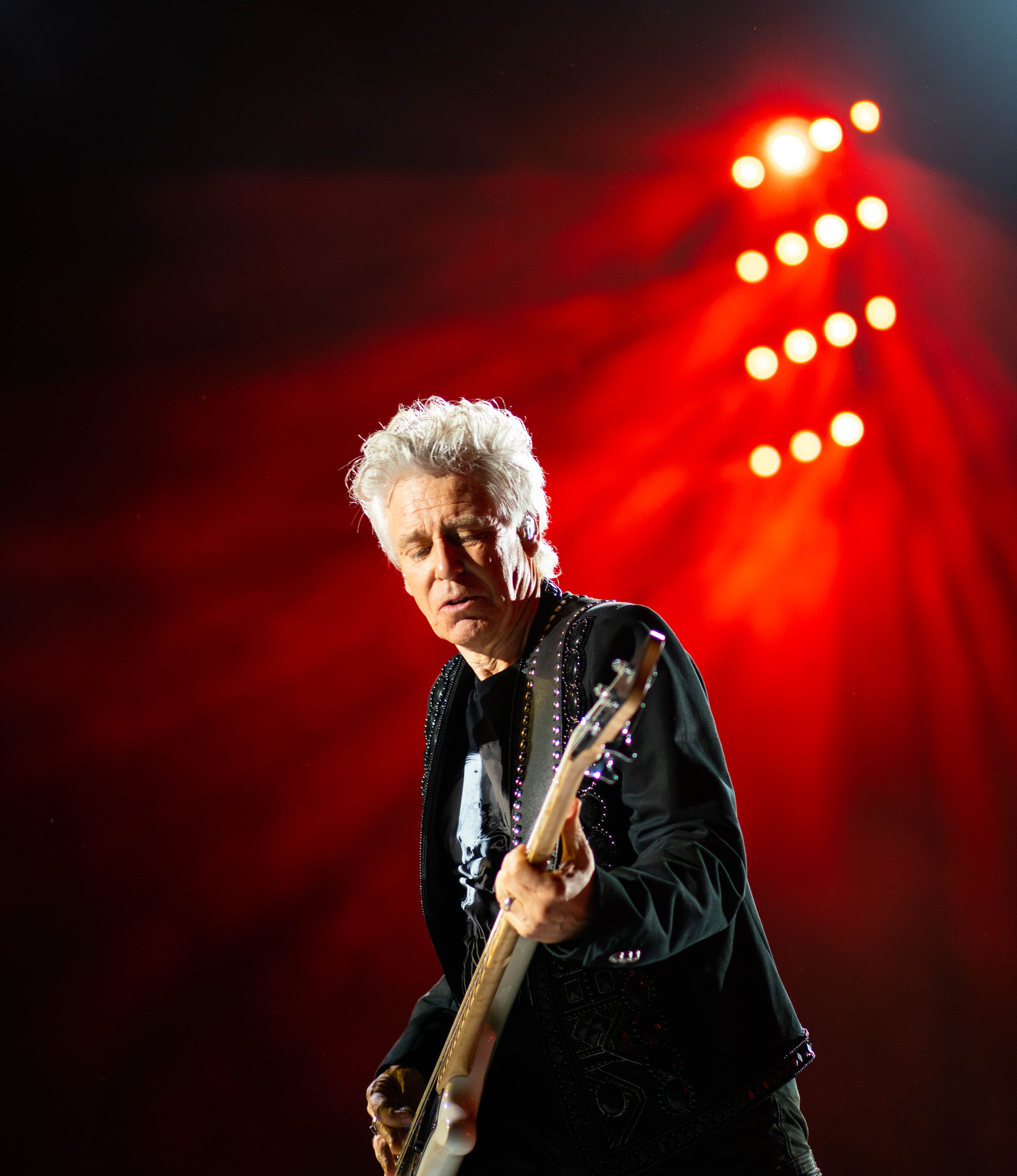
Clayton lit by one of the cantilevered trusses of Bad Boy lighting fixtures

Due to the decision to keep the video screen unobstructed, the amount of possible lighting positions was reduced. All of the moving lighting fixtures were PRG Bad Boy spotlights, most of the high-powered variety; the fixture was chosen for its high throw distance and was made as bright as possible. Each of the four cantilevers held 16 Bad Boys, arranged on ladder-like trusses in a 4×4 arrangement, while a full row of Bad Boys was built into the top and bottom of the video screen. The four delay towers featured lighting, as did six platforms in the highest stadium seats. In total, 218 Bad Boys were used. The fixture was integrated into a spotlight control system called PRG GroundControl. Developed by Williams with PRG, the system outfitted the spotlights with video cameras, allowing an operator using a control unit at ground level to see the fixtures' point-of-view on a video monitor. This enabled them to operate more than one spotlight. The lights could be placed in locations where a person would not fit, thus negating the need for riggers, or in Williams's words, "the need to hoist burly men in yellow T-shirts high into the air". The GroundControl system comprised 11 high-output Bad Boys and 9 Longthrow Bad Boys, managed by 17 operators. The static lighting fixtures included: 56 Martin by Harman Atomic strobe lights with scrollers; 8 Hubbell sodium-vapor lamps; 6 HungaroFlash T-Light Pro 85K fixtures on the stage floor; 400 DWE bulbs in TMB ProCan units; and 48 overhead Chroma-Q Color Force 48 LED battens. Lighting director Mark "Sparky" Risk operated three MA Lighting grandMA2 full control consoles and one grandMA2 light console.

To accommodate the time required to transport the steel framework between cities and the two-and-a-half days required to build it, three separate sets of steel were used on tour, each one travelling on 16 trucks. As a result, while one structure was in use for a concert, another one was being erected elsewhere while a third was being disassembled. The lighting, sound, and video systems traveled on 30 trucks and required about eight hours to assemble. Tour director Craig Evans estimated that approximately 196 people were employed on tour, including 84 crew members and 42 entourage members who traveled on nine buses.

Several environmentally-friendly initiatives were encouraged amongst tour personnel and concertgoers in an attempt to reduce the band's carbon footprint. Some of the efforts included: encouraging fans to use public transportation; offering compostable merchandise bags; requesting venues to offer paper straws (instead of plastic ones) and reusable beverage cups; offering vegan and vegetarian meals to tour personnel; providing reusable water bottles to tour crew and making water stations available to attendees; recycling guitar strings; and using hydrogen vehicles. Tour environmental advisor Michael Martin tracked the model of each tour vehicle and the mileage they accrued in an attempt to calculate the tour's total carbon dioxide emissions. All of the tour's carbon offsets were validated to meet the CDM Gold Standard.

== Concert synopsis ==
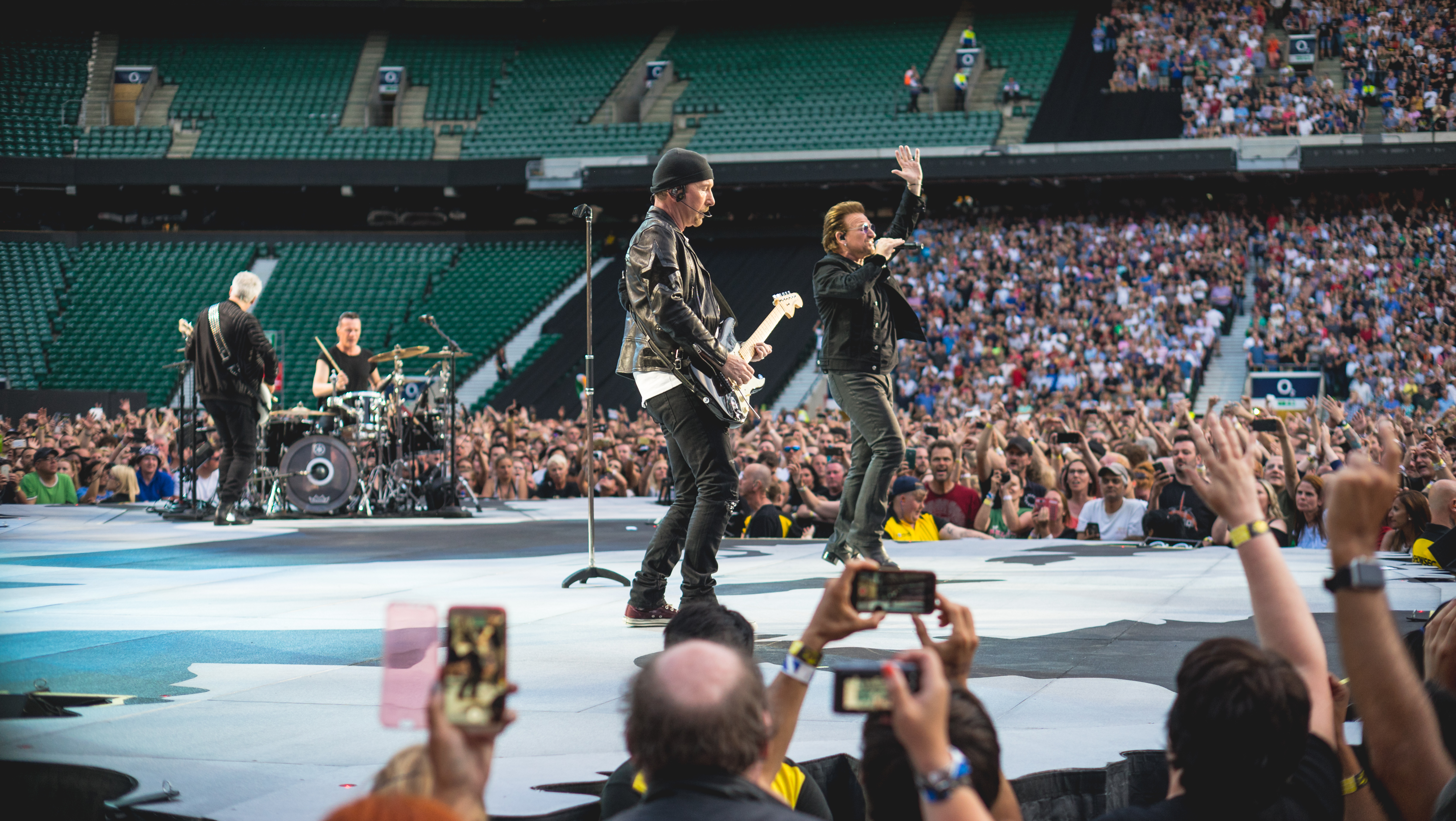
U2 opened shows on the tour by performing on the Joshua tree-shaped B-stage.

=== 2017 concerts ===
During the pre-show, the video screen displayed various poems. The band chose specific poetry "that expresses the experience of the country" in which they were performing so the audience members could reflect on it before the concerts. Selected works included: "The Border: A Double Sonnet" by Alberto Ríos; "Kaddish for Leonard Cohen" and "Ain't You Scared of the Sacred" by George Elliott Clarke; "I Hear America Singing" by Walt Whitman; "Ghazal for White Hen Pantry" by Jamila Woods; "One Today" by Richard Blanco; "Filipineza" by Bino Realuyo; and works by Pedro Pietri, Lucille Clifton, and Langston Hughes. The first ten concerts featured the Pogues' song "A Rainy Night in Soho" (1986) as introduction music to accompany U2 taking the stage; starting with their performance at the Bonnaroo Music Festival, the Waterboys' song "The Whole of the Moon" (1985) was used instead for the remaining of the tour.

U2 began the concerts on the B-stage by playing some of their earliest hits, including "Sunday Bloody Sunday", "New Year's Day", and "Pride (In the Name of Love)". The third verse of "New Year's Day" was performed for the first time. Bono said this act of the show comprised "songs that got [the band] to The Joshua Tree". No video reinforcement was used during this segment, as the group wanted their fans to concentrate on the music. Bono said he was forced to "make the singing be the connective tissue", adding, "It's nice being ants for a few songs since you've just got to focus on the music since there's nowhere else to look." Williams described this part of the show as "U2 opening for U2", much like how they performed at music festivals with a lower billing earlier in their career.

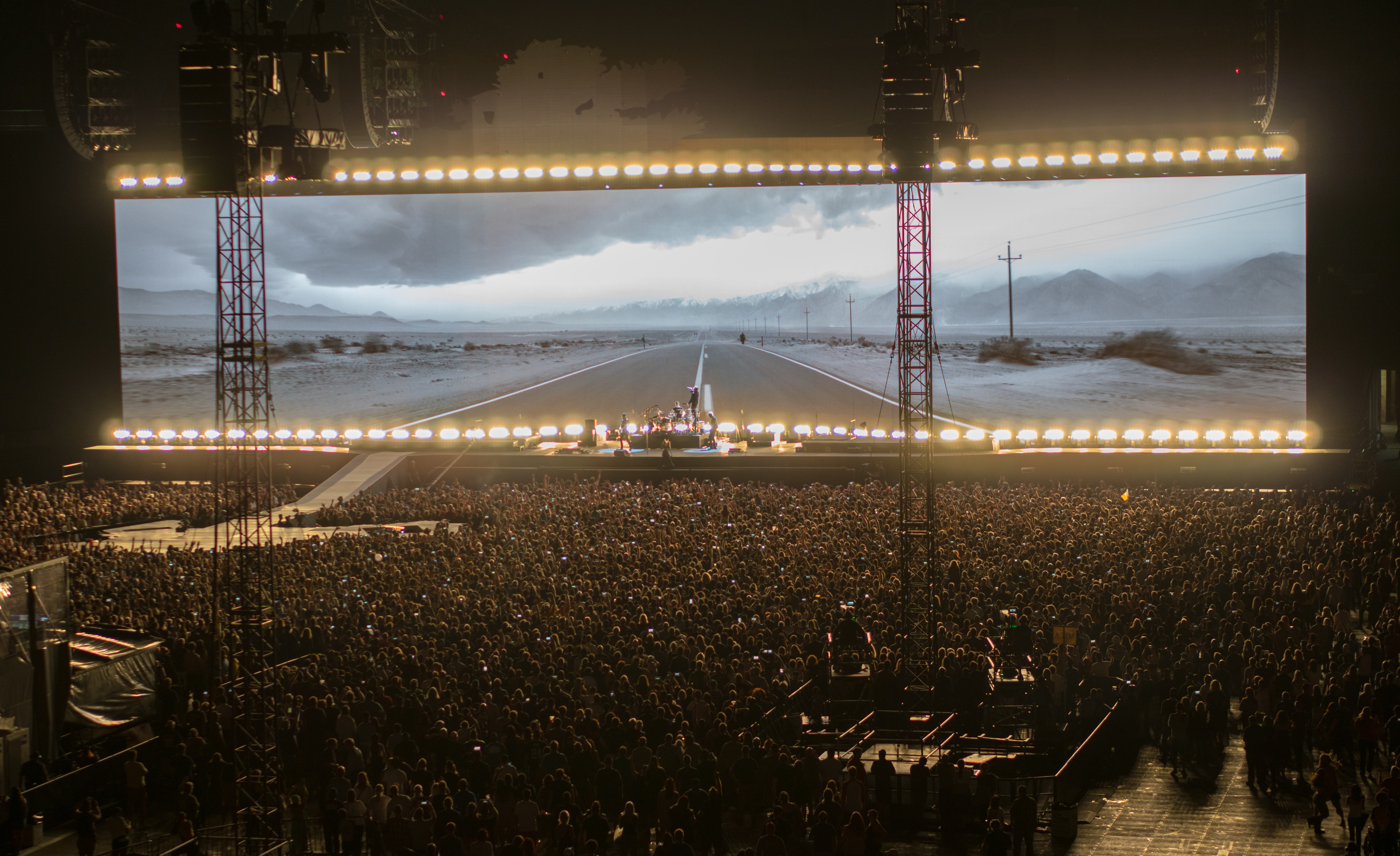
The video screen displayed UHD visuals, beginning with a performance of "Where the Streets Have No Name", which was accompanied by a film of a desert highway.

For The Joshua Tree segment of the concerts, the band performed on the main stage against a backdrop of visuals on the video screen. Many of the songs were accompanied by short films depicting desert landscapes that were created by Corbijn. The photographer said his objective was "putting The Joshua Tree into America now". The album's opening song "Where the Streets Have No Name" was accompanied by a slow tracking shot of a desert highway featuring migrants walking. For "I Still Haven't Found What I'm Looking For", a forest of trees was depicted; many of the trees were burnt, which to Corbijn represented a "burnt American dream". During "With or Without You", images of Zabriskie Point were displayed. For "Bullet the Blue Sky", the visuals showed men and women of various ages and ethnicities putting on army helmets while standing in front of a shed painted with the American flag. During the song's performance, Bono shone a handheld spotlight on the Edge, evoking the cover image of the band's 1988 album, Rattle and Hum. For "Red Hill Mining Town", the Salvation Army brass band was depicted on screen, with their pre-recorded brass section accompanying the band's performance. "Trip Through Your Wires" was accompanied by visuals of the Edge's wife, choreographer Morleigh Steinberg, dressed as a cowgirl while an American flag was painted on a wooden shack. The video that played during "One Tree Hill" featured images of a blood red-coloured moon that faded into footage of Native Americans. It was directed by Corbijn and filmed in Lancaster, California, over a 14-hour film shoot. For concerts in Auckland on the 2019 tour, the band used "One Tree Hill" to pay tribute to the late New Zealander Greg Carroll, for whom the song was written; Carroll's likeness appeared on the screen at the end of these performances.

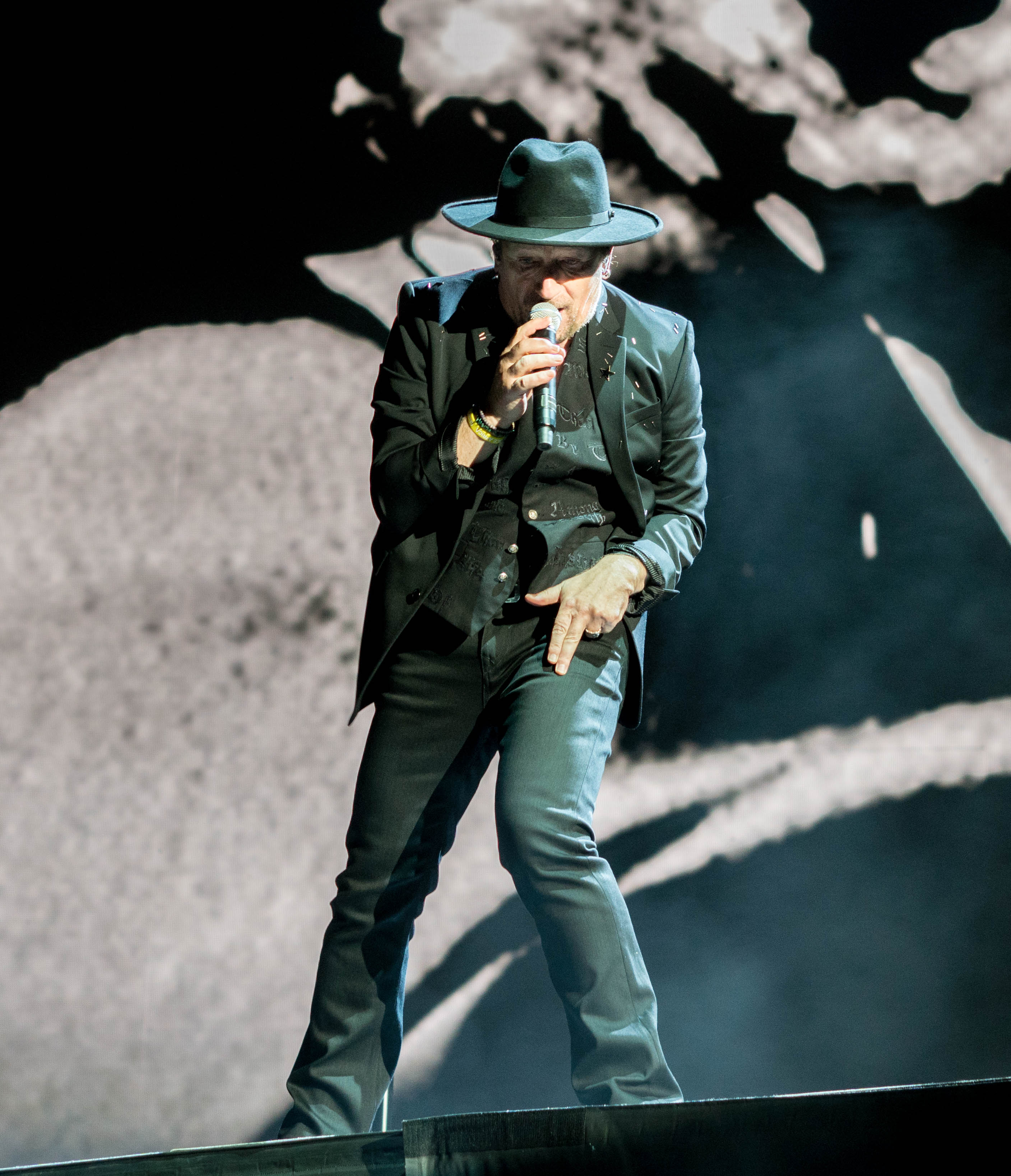
Bono portraying a character called the "Shadow Man" during a performance of "Exit"

Prior to "Exit", a clip from the 1950s Western TV series Trackdown was shown; in the clip, a con man named Trump visits a town and promises he can build a wall around them to protect them from a supposed apocalypse. The band were pleased when Bono discovered it, as they wanted to make a reference to US President Donald Trump during the show without belabouring their point. The clip was followed by an image of hands tattooed "LOVE" and "HATE", inspired by the fanatic preacher/killer character in the film The Night of the Hunter. During the performance of "Exit", Bono wore a black suit and preacher hat and adopted the persona of the "Shadow Man". Taking influence from author Flannery O'Connor, whose works originally inspired the writing of the song, Bono used the Shadow Man to recite lines from O'Connor's novel Wise Blood and the "Eeny, meeny, miny, moe" rhyme.

The encore was described by Bono as a "denouement" intended as an ode to women. Speaking about the inspiration behind the idea, Williams said, "The thought was that we are currently living in a time when we could really use a more feminine spirit in our leadership and a way to illustrate this might be to celebrate some of the great female pioneers of the past." Bono wanted to find "the sort of women that aren't welcome, that President Trump doesn't want in America" and commissioned French artist JR to find such a person. After traveling to the Zaatari refugee camp in Jordan, he found a 15-year-old Syrian refugee named Omaima. Performances of "Miss Sarajevo" were preceded by a clip of her speaking about America as a dreamland, which Bono said "gives you a kick in the balls, but in the most velvet way". The song was accompanied by footage of the camp's bleak conditions, while audience members passed a large sheet of fabric printed with Omaima's passport photo around the venue. For "Ultraviolet (Light My Way)", the video screen displayed images of historical female figures and achievers. Prior to "One", Bono promoted the ONE Campaign by discussing the fight against HIV/AIDS. Many concerts concluded with a performance of the new song "The Little Things That Give You Away", which was included on the group's 2017 album Songs of Experience. Another song from the album, the lead single "You're the Best Thing About Me", was also performed during the encore. Some concerts closed with "I Will Follow", from the band's first album, Boy (1980).

=== 2019 concerts ===
Whilst the majority of the show for the 2019 concerts stayed faithful to the 2017 shows, a few changes were made to the setlist. "I Will Follow", which was played sporadically at the 2017 shows was given a regular slot between "Sunday Bloody Sunday" and "New Year's Day" from the Melbourne show onwards. Two exceptions to this were the second Tokyo show and the Manila show, where "Gloria" was played instead, making its tour debut. The third verse of "New Year's Day" was dropped from the Adelaide show onwards, with the song ending after the final chorus similar to previous tours. The Joshua Tree segment of the show remained the same as the 2017 shows, with the exception being the end of the main set. Instead of ending the main set with "Mothers of the Disappeared", as they did at the 2017 shows, the band would walk down to the B-stage as the song ended, would then bow to the audience and then end the main set with a performance of either "Angel of Harlem" or "Desire", both of which did not appear at any of the 2017 shows. The band would then walk back up towards the main stage as either song concluded, ending the main set.

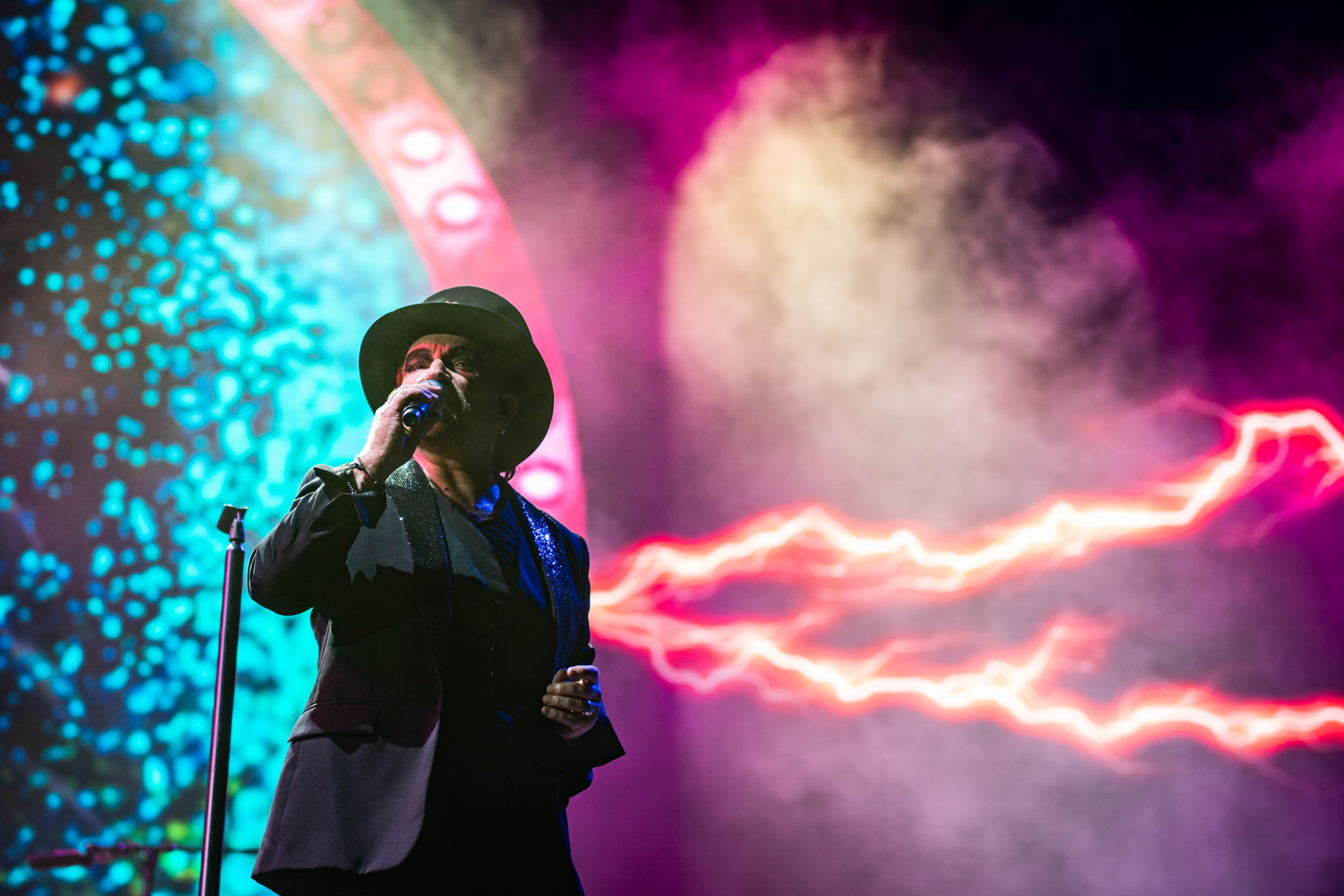
Bono in his MacPhisto costume during a performance of "Even Better Than the Real Thing" in Perth, Australia

The encore was changed quite substantially from the 2017 shows, taking a number of influences from their recent Experience + Innocence Tour as well as incorporating more songs from their recent studio albums. The encore would open with the Influx Remix of "Elevation" playing over the PA, whilst also using the same video that the band used walking out of the "barricage" on the Experience + Innocence Tour. The band then performed "Elevation", "Vertigo" and "Even Better Than the Real Thing", which was also the same sequence of songs that were used on the second act of the "Experience + Innocence Tour", including incorporating similar visual elements and Bono reprising his MacPhisto/Showman costume from the same tour. The band would then perform a stripped-down version of either "Every Breaking Wave" in a similar performance to the Innocence + Experience Tour, or "You're the Best Thing About Me" in a similar performance to the Experience + Innocence Tour. After this, "Beautiful Day" and "Ultraviolet (Light My Way)" would be played similar to how they were performed at the 2017 shows. "Love Is Bigger Than Anything in Its Way" was typically played next, although it was replaced by "Stuck in a Moment You Can't Get Out Of" at both Sydney shows and "Ahimsa" at the Mumbai show. Every concert at the 2019 shows concluded with "One".

=== Guest appearances ===
During the 14 May 2017 show in Seattle, Eddie Vedder and Mumford & Sons accompanied U2 on-stage for a performance of "Mothers of the Disappeared". Patti Smith joined U2 for a performance of the same song during their 26 July 2017 concert in Saint-Denis. She joined them again for a performance of the same song during their 3 September 2017 concert in Detroit. During the band's 15 December 2019 concert in Mumbai, they were accompanied by several guest performers: A.R. Rahman, his daughters Khatija and Raheema, and singer Rianjali Bhowmick joined the band for a rendition of "Ahimsa", which Rahman and U2 had released as a single the month prior; Noel Gallagher joined the band for a performance of "Desire"; and at the end of the show, both Rahman and Gallagher accompanied U2 for "One".

== Reception ==
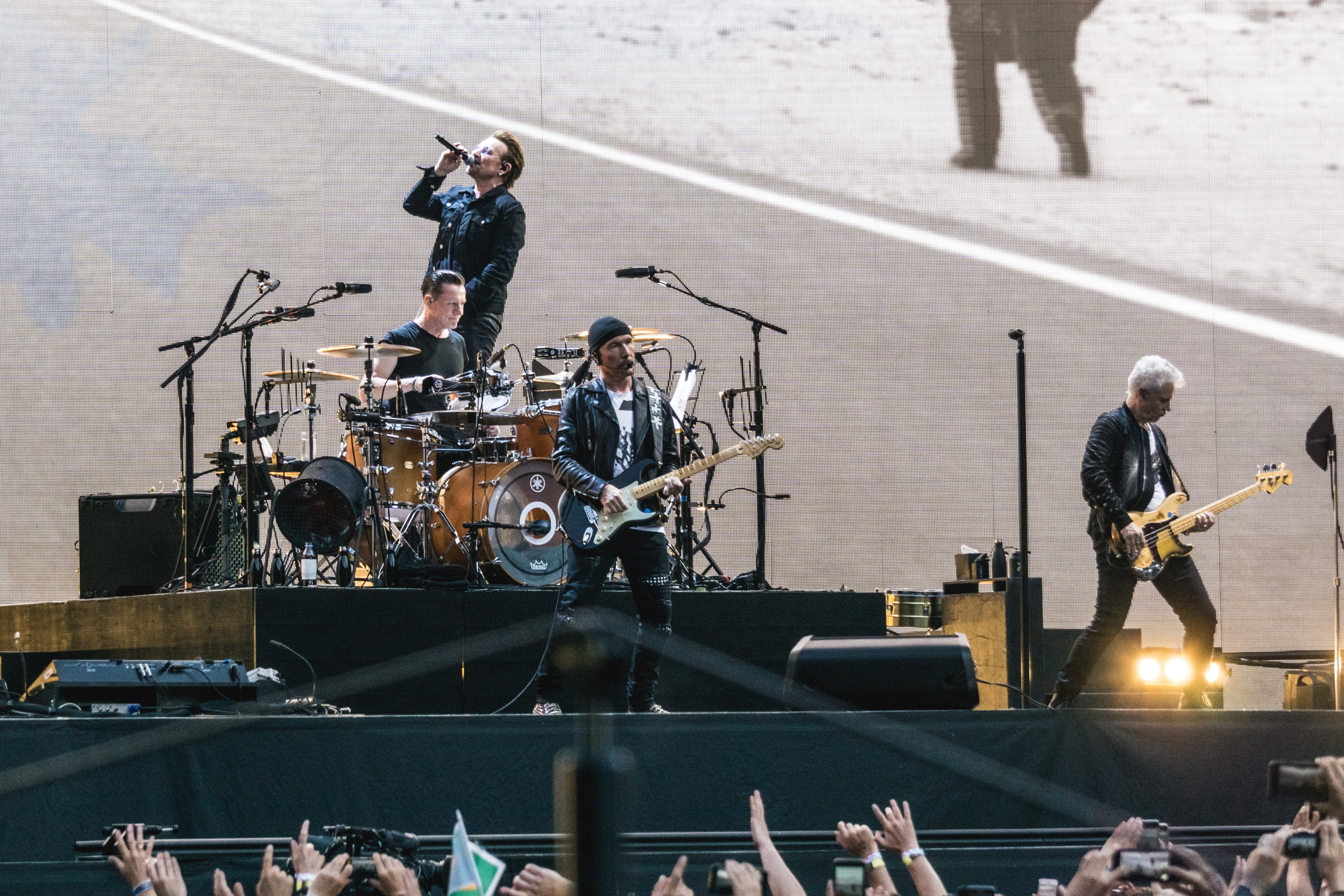
U2 performing at Twickenham Stadium in London in July 2017

=== Critical response ===
The tour received critical acclaim from critics, many of whom praised the band's performances, the production, and setlist. Greg Kot of the Chicago Tribune said that The Joshua Tree "still held sway" three decades after its release, adding: "Most compelling was that U2 made it sound less like a finished work, a monument from a long-lost decade, than a series of songs still in search of answers." Alexis Petridis of The Guardian complimented the group for keeping older material contemporaneous through lyrical changes and thematic reinterpretations. He said, "But more striking still is how commanding and confident their performance seems, particularly given that it's not without risks." He concluded his review by describing them as "totally in their element". The Evening Standard and The Independent also gave five star reviews, with the latter calling it "a triumphant experience".

=== Accolades ===
At the 2017 Billboard Touring Awards, the tour won for Top Boxscore (at Stade de France on 25–26 July), while receiving nominations for Top Tour and Top Draw. It also won for Top Boxscore at the following year's awards ceremony (for concerts at Estádio do Morumbi on 19, 21–22, and 25 October). At the LOS40 Music Awards 2017, U2 won the Tour of the Year Award. At the 2018 iHeartRadio Music Awards, they won the award for Best Tour. The group won two awards at the 2018 Billboard Music Awards: Top Touring Artist and Top Rock Tour. The band were nominated in three categories at the 20th Annual Pollstar Awards: Major Tour of the Year, Rock Tour of the Year, and Most Creative Stage Production. The tour also received nominations for Tour of the Year at the American Music Awards of 2017, Live Performance of the Year at the 2017 BBC Music Awards, and top Tour/Event Sound Production at the 33rd Annual TEC Awards.

=== Commercial performance ===
On the opening leg of the 2017 tour, the band's two concerts at the Rose Bowl in Pasadena drew 123,164 attendees, grossing $15.7 million. In Chicago, the two shows at Soldier Field sold 105,078 tickets and grossed $13.4 million. The first North American leg of the tour, comprising 20 concerts excluding Bonnaroo, grossed $123.7 million from 1,043,414 tickets sold, ranking the band first among all 2017 global touring artists with an average gross of $7,276,551 per city. The European leg grossed $83 million from 744,454 tickets sold. The second North American leg grossed $38,585,915 from 350,292 tickets sold, maintaining the band's top rank globally with an average gross of $7,229,076 per city. The Latin American leg grossed $70 million from 574,976 tickets sold; the leg and the tour ended with four sold-out shows in São Paulo that sold around 280,000 tickets. In total, the Joshua Tree Tour 2017 drew 2,713,136 attendees to 50 shows and grossed $316,990,940, making it the highest-grossing tour of the year. It also ranked as the year's highest-grossing North American tour with $176.1 million earned. U2 were the highest-paid musical act in the world in 2017 with $54.4 million in earnings, $52 million of which they netted from touring.

For the 2019 tour, U2 grossed $35.7 million from eight concerts in Oceania and $38.1 million from seven shows in Asia. In total, the 2019 tour grossed $73.8 million and sold 567,000 tickets. Across the two tours, the band cumulatively grossed $390.8 million from 3.3 million tickets sold.

== Set list ==
These setlists were performed at the 22 September 2017 concert held at SDCCU Stadium in San Diego, and at the 8 November 2019 concert held at the Mount Smart Stadium in Auckland. It does not represent all shows throughout the tour.

=== 2017 ===
First act

1. "Sunday Bloody Sunday"
2. "New Year's Day"
3. "Bad"
4. "Pride (In the Name of Love)"

Second act: The Joshua Tree

5. "Where the Streets Have No Name"
6. "I Still Haven't Found What I'm Looking For"
7. "With or Without You"
8. "Bullet the Blue Sky"
9. "Running to Stand Still"
10. "Red Hill Mining Town"
11. "In God's Country"
12. "Trip Through Your Wires"
13. "One Tree Hill"
14. "Exit"
15. "Mothers of the Disappeared"

Encore

16. "Miss Sarajevo"
17. "Beautiful Day"
18. "Elevation"
19. "Vertigo"
20. "You're the Best Thing About Me"
21. "Ultraviolet (Light My Way)"
22. "One"

=== 2019 ===
First act

1. "Sunday Bloody Sunday"
2. "New Year's Day"
3. "Bad"
4. "Pride (In the Name of Love)"

Second act: The Joshua Tree

5. "Where the Streets Have No Name"
6. "I Still Haven't Found What I'm Looking For"
7. "With or Without You"
8. "Bullet the Blue Sky"
9. "Running to Stand Still"
10. "Red Hill Mining Town"
11. "In God's Country"
12. "Trip Through Your Wires"
13. "One Tree Hill"
14. "Exit"
15. "Mothers of the Disappeared"
16. "Angel of Harlem"

Encore

17. "Elevation"
18. "Vertigo"
19. "Even Better Than the Real Thing"
20. "Every Breaking Wave"
21. "Beautiful Day"
22. "Ultraviolet (Light My Way)"
23. "Love Is Bigger Than Anything in Its Way"
24. "One"

== Tour dates ==
Leg 1: North America
Date	City	Country	Venue	Opening acts	Attendance	Revenue
12 May 2017	Vancouver	Canada	BC Place	Mumford & Sons	45,436 / 45,436	$4,321,731
14 May 2017	Seattle	United States	CenturyLink Field	Mumford & Sons	57,009 / 57,009	$6,249,670
17 May 2017	Santa Clara	United States	Levi's Stadium	Mumford & Sons	50,072 / 50,072	$6,268,805
20 May 2017	Pasadena	United States	Rose Bowl	The Lumineers	123,164 / 123,164	$15,784,565
21 May 2017	Pasadena	United States	Rose Bowl	The Lumineers	123,164 / 123,164	$15,784,565
24 May 2017	Houston	United States	NRG Stadium	The Lumineers	47,669 / 47,669	$5,889,005
26 May 2017	Arlington	United States	AT&T Stadium	The Lumineers	49,807 / 49,807	$6,044,330
3 June 2017	Chicago	United States	Soldier Field	The Lumineers	105,078 / 105,078	$13,435,925
4 June 2017	Chicago	United States	Soldier Field	The Lumineers	105,078 / 105,078	$13,435,925
7 June 2017	Pittsburgh	United States	Heinz Field	The Lumineers	41,413 / 41,413	$4,273,920
9 June 2017 (Note: The show on 9 June 2017 in Manchester, Tennessee was part of the 2017 Bonnaroo Music Festival.)	Manchester	United States	Great Stage Park	—N/a	—N/a	—N/a
11 June 2017	Miami Gardens	United States	Hard Rock Stadium	OneRepublic	48,494 / 48,494	$5,923,665
14 June 2017	Tampa	United States	Raymond James Stadium	OneRepublic	52,958 / 52,958	$6,125,415
16 June 2017	Louisville	United States	Papa John's Cardinal Stadium	OneRepublic	45,491 / 45,491	$4,810,535
18 June 2017	Philadelphia	United States	Lincoln Financial Field	The Lumineers	56,570 / 56,570	$6,259,880
20 June 2017	Landover	United States	FedExField	The Lumineers	49,827 / 49,827	$6,286,385
23 June 2017	Toronto	Canada	Rogers Centre	The Lumineers	52,704 / 52,704	$5,059,568
25 June 2017	Foxborough	United States	Gillette Stadium	The Lumineers	55,231 / 55,231	$6,881,340
28 June 2017	East Rutherford	United States	MetLife Stadium	The Lumineers	110,642 / 110,642	$14,568,805
29 June 2017	East Rutherford	United States	MetLife Stadium	The Lumineers	110,642 / 110,642	$14,568,805
1 July 2017	Cleveland	United States	FirstEnergy Stadium	OneRepublic	51,849 / 51,849	$5,582,965

Leg 2: Europe
Date	City	Country	Venue	Opening acts	Attendance	Revenue
8 July 2017	London	England	Twickenham Stadium	Noel Gallagher's High Flying Birds	108,894 / 108,894	$14,750,646
9 July 2017	London	England	Twickenham Stadium	Noel Gallagher's High Flying Birds	108,894 / 108,894	$14,750,646
12 July 2017	Berlin	Germany	Olympiastadion	Noel Gallagher's High Flying Birds	71,039 / 71,039	$7,215,052
15 July 2017	Rome	Italy	Stadio Olimpico	Noel Gallagher's High Flying Birds	117,924 / 117,924	$12,266,299
16 July 2017	Rome	Italy	Stadio Olimpico	Noel Gallagher's High Flying Birds	117,924 / 117,924	$12,266,299
18 July 2017	Barcelona	Spain	Estadi Olímpic Lluís Companys	Noel Gallagher's High Flying Birds	54,551 / 54,551	$5,930,076
22 July 2017	Dublin	Ireland	Croke Park	Noel Gallagher's High Flying Birds	80,901 / 80,901	$9,963,957
25 July 2017	Saint-Denis	France	Stade de France	Noel Gallagher's High Flying Birds	154,486 / 154,486	$17,277,631
26 July 2017	Saint-Denis	France	Stade de France	Noel Gallagher's High Flying Birds	154,486 / 154,486	$17,277,631
29 July 2017	Amsterdam	Netherlands	Amsterdam Arena	Noel Gallagher's High Flying Birds	104,708 / 104,708	$11,544,870
30 July 2017	Amsterdam	Netherlands	Amsterdam Arena	Noel Gallagher's High Flying Birds	104,708 / 104,708	$11,544,870
1 August 2017	Brussels	Belgium	King Baudouin Stadium	Noel Gallagher's High Flying Birds	51,951 / 51,951	$6,000,537

Leg 3: North America
Date	City	Country	Venue	Opening acts	Attendance	Revenue
3 September 2017	Detroit	United States	Ford Field	Beck	42,905 / 42,905	$4,936,605
5 September 2017	Orchard Park	United States	New Era Field	Beck	41,106 / 41,106	$4,269,245
8 September 2017	Minneapolis	United States	U.S. Bank Stadium	Beck	43,386 / 43,386	$4,698,100
10 September 2017	Indianapolis	United States	Lucas Oil Stadium	Beck	51,731 / 51,731	$5,970,055
12 September 2017	Kansas City	United States	Arrowhead Stadium	Beck	39,593 / 39,593	$4,200,160
14 September 2017	New Orleans	United States	Mercedes-Benz Superdome	Beck	34,536 / 34,536	$3,873,405
19 September 2017	Glendale	United States	University of Phoenix Stadium	Beck	42,814 / 42,814	$4,169,215
22 September 2017	San Diego	United States	SDCCU Stadium	Beck	54,221 / 54,221	$6,469,130

Leg 4: Latin America
Date	City	Country	Venue	Opening acts	Attendance	Revenue
3 October 2017	Mexico City	Mexico	Foro Sol	Noel Gallagher's High Flying Birds	117,098 / 117,098	$13,896,378
4 October 2017	Mexico City	Mexico	Foro Sol	Noel Gallagher's High Flying Birds	117,098 / 117,098	$13,896,378
7 October 2017	Bogotá	Colombia	Estadio El Campín	Noel Gallagher's High Flying Birds	39,272 / 39,272	$6,449,019
10 October 2017 (Note: The show was delayed for two hours due to a football match between Ecuador and Argentina.)	La Plata	Argentina	Estadio Ciudad de La Plata	Joystick; Noel Gallagher's High Flying Birds	86,466 / 86,466	$11,078,667
11 October 2017	La Plata	Argentina	Estadio Ciudad de La Plata	Joystick; Noel Gallagher's High Flying Birds	86,466 / 86,466	$11,078,667
14 October 2017	Santiago	Chile	Estadio Nacional de Chile	Noel Gallagher's High Flying Birds	53,422 / 53,422	$6,146,221
19 October 2017	São Paulo	Brazil	Estádio do Morumbi	Noel Gallagher's High Flying Birds	278,718 / 278,718	$32,119,163
21 October 2017	São Paulo	Brazil	Estádio do Morumbi	Noel Gallagher's High Flying Birds	278,718 / 278,718	$32,119,163
22 October 2017	São Paulo	Brazil	Estádio do Morumbi	Noel Gallagher's High Flying Birds	278,718 / 278,718	$32,119,163
25 October 2017	São Paulo	Brazil	Estádio do Morumbi	Noel Gallagher's High Flying Birds	278,718 / 278,718	$32,119,163

Leg 5: Oceania and Asia
Date	City	Country	Venue	Opening acts	Attendance	Revenue
8 November 2019	Auckland	New Zealand	Mount Smart Stadium	Noel Gallagher's High Flying Birds	69,823 / 69,823	$7,223,935
9 November 2019	Auckland	New Zealand	Mount Smart Stadium	Noel Gallagher's High Flying Birds	69,823 / 69,823	$7,223,935
12 November 2019	Brisbane	Australia	Lang Park	Noel Gallagher's High Flying Birds	45,609 / 45,609	$5,043,388
15 November 2019	Melbourne	Australia	Docklands Stadium	Noel Gallagher's High Flying Birds	59,726 / 59,726	$6,909,670
19 November 2019	Adelaide	Australia	Adelaide Oval	Noel Gallagher's High Flying Birds	30,708 / 30,708	$2,497,877
22 November 2019	Sydney	Australia	Sydney Cricket Ground	Noel Gallagher's High Flying Birds	85,654 / 85,654	$9,596,903
23 November 2019	Sydney	Australia	Sydney Cricket Ground	Noel Gallagher's High Flying Birds	85,654 / 85,654	$9,596,903
27 November 2019	Perth	Australia	Perth Stadium	Noel Gallagher's High Flying Birds	46,441 / 46,441	$4,433,351
30 November 2019	Singapore		National Stadium	—N/a	82,557 / 82,557	$12,433,310
1 December 2019	Singapore		National Stadium	—N/a	82,557 / 82,557	$12,433,310
4 December 2019	Saitama	Japan	Saitama Super Arena	—N/a	43,225 / 43,225	$10,343,858
5 December 2019	Saitama	Japan	Saitama Super Arena	—N/a	43,225 / 43,225	$10,343,858
8 December 2019	Seoul	South Korea	Gocheok Sky Dome	—N/a	26,522 / 26,522	$3,714,350
11 December 2019	Bocaue	Philippines	Philippine Arena	—N/a	33,721 / 33,721	$6,895,277
15 December 2019	Mumbai	India	DY Patil Stadium	—N/a	42,590 / 42,590	$4,695,722
Total					3,279,712 / 3,279,712 (100%)	$390,778,581

=== Cancelled shows ===
List of cancelled concerts, showing date, city, country, venue and reason for cancellation
Date	City	Country	Venue	Reason
16 September 2017	St. Louis	United States	The Dome at America's Center	Safety concerns

== See also ==
- List of highest-grossing concert tours
