= 2017 Bonnaroo Music Festival =

The 2017 Bonnaroo Music Festival was held June 8 to 11, 2017 in Manchester, Tennessee. This marked the sixteenth consecutive festival since its inception in 2002. The attendance increased up to forty percent from the previous year, reaching more than 65,000 people. The headliners were Irish rock band U2, Canadian singer The Weeknd, American rapper Chance the Rapper, and American rock band Red Hot Chili Peppers.

== Set lists ==
Here are the lists of songs performed at 2017 Bonnaroo by the headliners.

U2
1. "Sunday Bloody Sunday"
2. "New Year's Day"
3. "Pride (In the Name of Love)"

The Joshua Tree Set

4. "Where the Streets Have No Name"
5. "I Still Haven't Found What I'm Looking For"
6. "With or Without You"
7. "Bullet the Blue Sky"
8. "Running to Stand Still"
9. "Red Hill Mining Town"
10. "In God's Country"
11. "Trip Through Your Wires"
12. "One Tree Hill"
13. "Exit"
14. "Mothers of the Disappeared"

Encore

15. "Beautiful Day"
16. "Elevation"
17. "Vertigo"
18. "Ultraviolet (Light My Way)"
19. "One"
Red Hot Chili Peppers
1. "Intro Jam"
2. "Can't Stop"
3. "Dani California"
4. "Scar Tissue"
5. "Dark Necessities"
6. "The Adventures of Rain Dance Maggie"
7. "I Wanna Be Your Dog"
8. "Right on Time"
9. "Go Robot"
10. "Californication"
11. "What Is Soul?"
12. "Aeroplane"
13. "Snow ((Hey Oh))"
14. "Suck My Kiss"
15. "Soul to Squeeze"
16. "By the Way"

Encore

17. "Goodbye Angels"
18. "Give It Away"
Chance the Rapper
1. "Mixtape"
2. "Blessings"
3. "Angels"
4. "Juke Jam"
5. "Waves"/"Father Stretch My Hands"/"Ultralight Beam"
6. "Sunday Candy"
7. "I'm the One"
8. "Favorite Song"
9. "Cocoa Butter Kisses"
10. "All We Got"
11. "No Problem"
12. "May I Have This Dance (Remix)" (with Francis and the Lights)
13. "All Night"
14. "Finish Line / Drown"
15. "Same Drugs"
16. "Blessings (Reprise)"
The Weeknd
1. "Starboy"
2. "Party Monster"
3. "Reminder"
4. "Six Feet Under"
5. "Low Life"
6. "Might Not"
7. "Sidewalks"
8. "Often"
9. "Acquainted"
10. "Or Nah"
11. "Tell Your Friends"
12. "Wicked Games"
13. "Earned It"
14. "In the Night"
15. "Rockin'"
16. "Secrets"
17. "Can't Feel My Face"
18. "I Feel It Coming"

Encore

19. "The Hills"

== Line-ups ==
The information was taken from Pass the Aux website. Artists listed from earliest to latest set times.

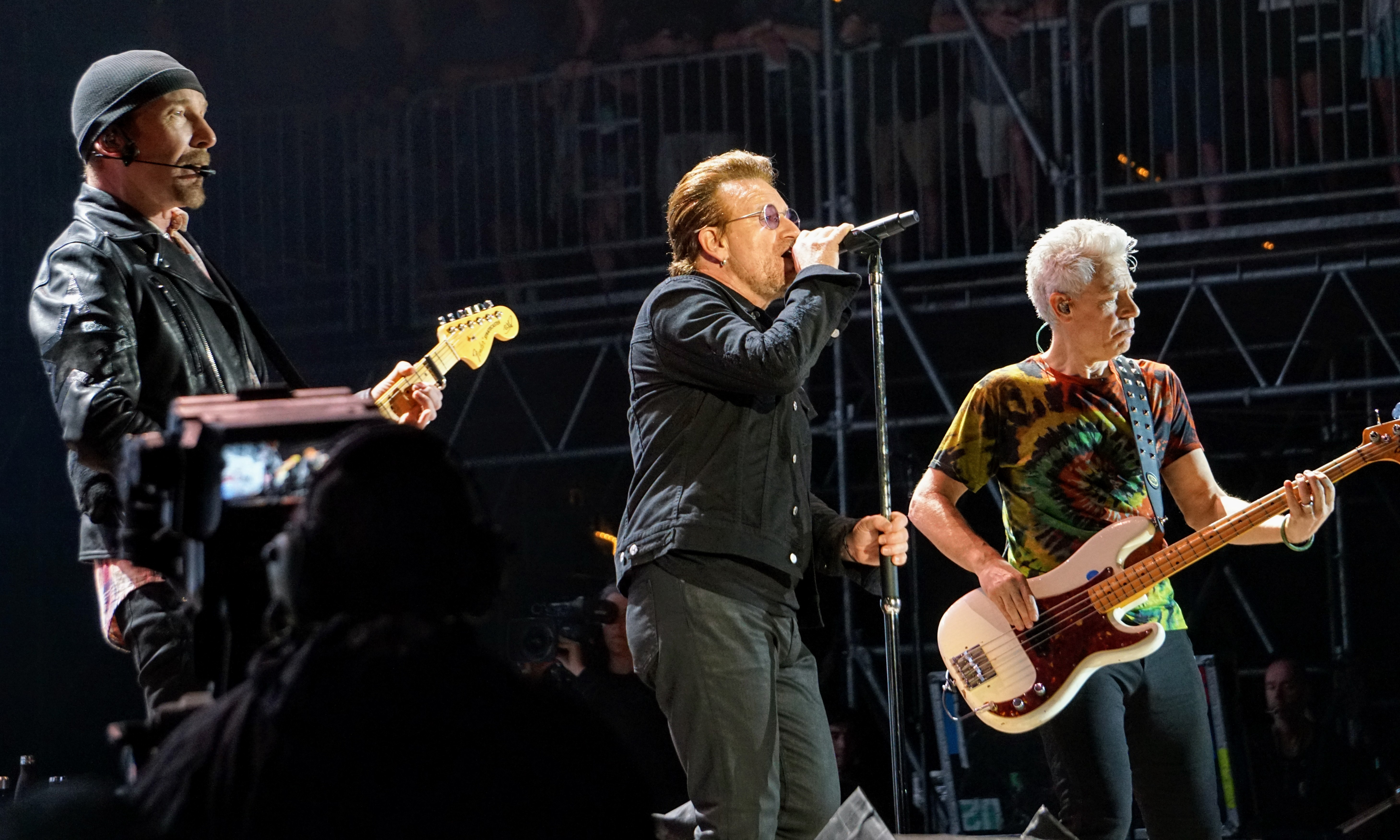
Headliner U2 performing live at Bonnaroo 2017.

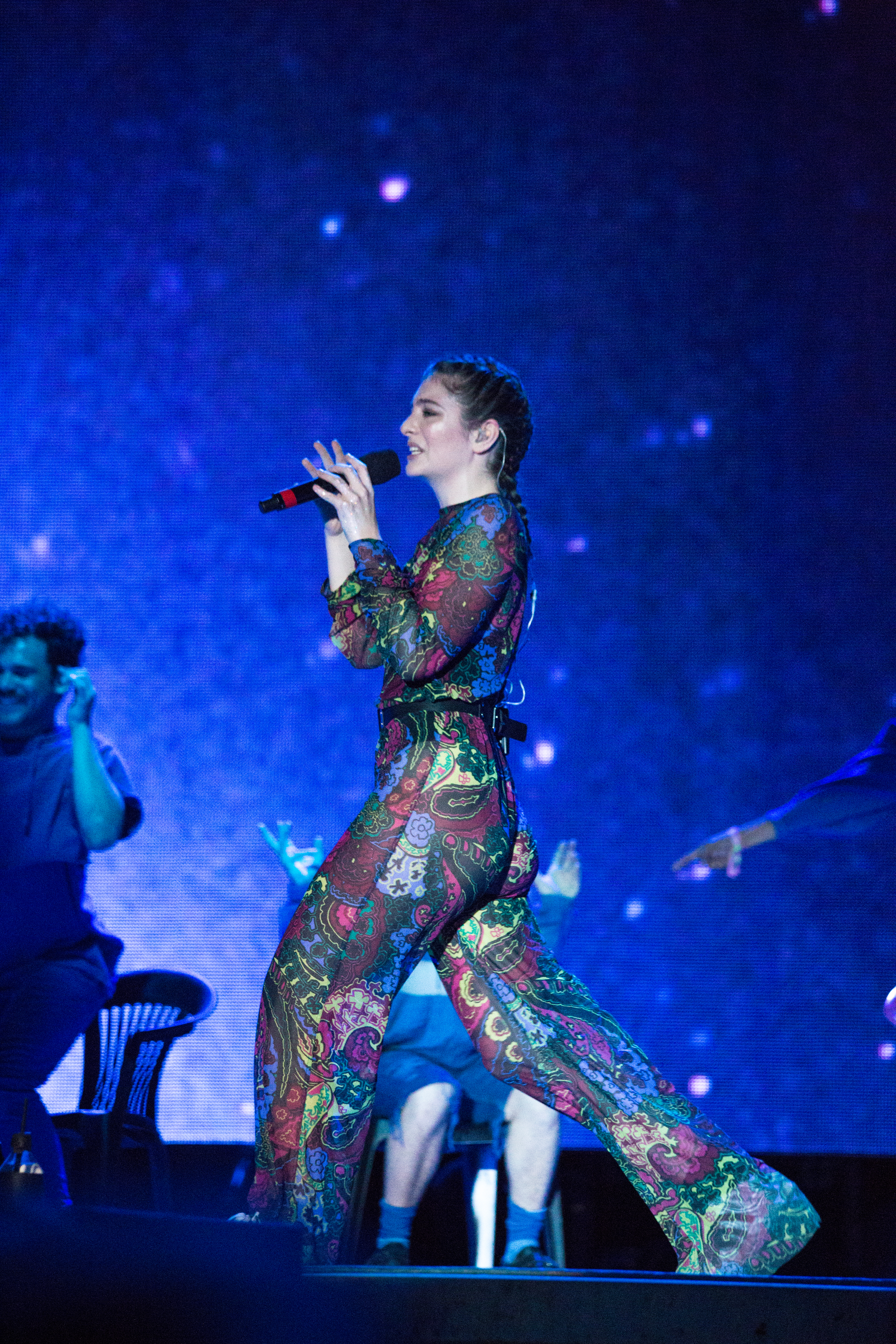
Lorde performing at the What Stage.

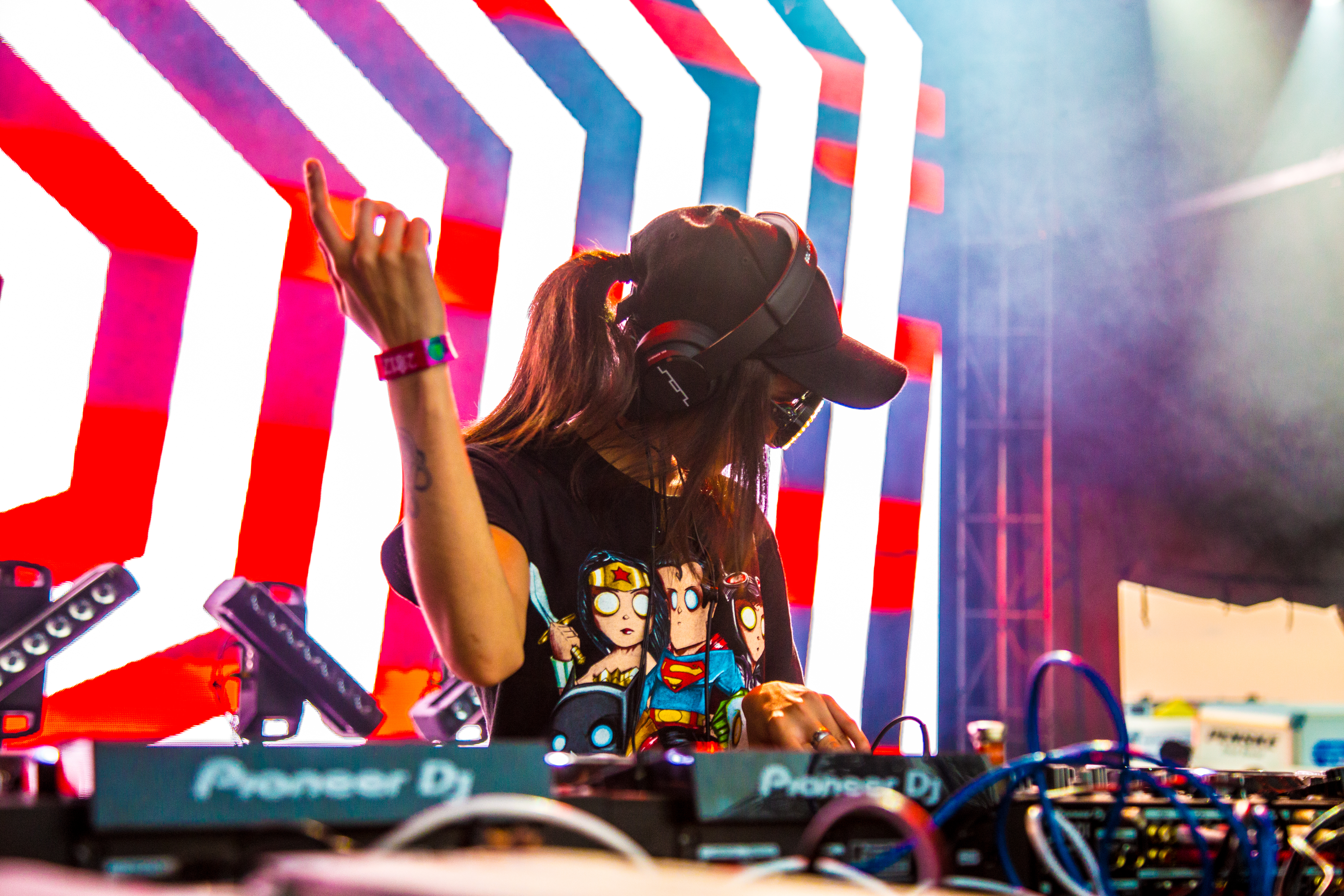
Rezz performing at The Other.

=== Thursday, June 8 ===
- This Tent: Luke Combs, Hippo Campus, July Talk, Mondo Cozmo, Eden, Kevin Abstract
- That Tent: Welles, Twiddle, The Orwells, The Lemon Twigs, Turkuaz, Kaiydo
- The Other: Goldfish, Innanet James, Haywyre, Herobust, G Jones, Ookay
- Who Stage: Walden, James Hersey, Two Feet, Charlotte Cardin, Dermot Kennedy, Allan Rayman
- New Music on Tap Lounge: Zipper Club, Corey Harper, Mt. Joy, Ten Fé, Johnny Balik

=== Friday, June 9 ===
- What Stage: Léon, Francis and the Lights, Kaleo, The xx, U2
- Which Stage: Klangstof, The Strumbellas, Cold War Kids, Tove Lo, Glass Animals, Major Lazer
- This Tent: Twin Limb, Khruangbin, Car Seat Headrest, James Vincent McMorrow, Gallant, Portugal. The Man
- That Tent: Wilderado, Kevin Morby, Stick Figure, Angélique Kidjo, Preservation Hall Jazz Band, Russ
- The Other: Barclay Crenshaw, Ganja White Night, D.R.A.M., Illenium, Getter, Nghtmre, Claude VonStroke, Big Gigantic
- Who Stage: Sweet Sweet, Walker Lukens, Blossoms, Albin Lee Meldau, Nightly, Jack Harlow
- New Music on Tap Lounge: Magic City Hippies, Springtime Carnivore, Lanco, Jay Som, Great Good Fine Ok

=== Saturday, June 10 ===
- What Stage: The Front Bottoms, Jon Bellion, Future Islands, Chance the Rapper, Red Hot Chili Peppers
- Which Stage: COIN, Rainbow Kitten Surprise, Tegan and Sara, The Head and the Heart, Cage the Elephant, Flume
- This Tent: Big Jesus, Lukas Nelson & Promise of the Real, Belly, Michael Kiwanuka, Warpaint, Superjam
- That Tent: Lucy Dacus, Deap Vally, Joseph, Bad Suns, Tory Lanez, Shpongle
- The Other: DJ Mel, Unlike Pluto, San Holo, Rezz, Matoma, Louis the Child, Snails, Marshmello
- Who Stage: Reuben Bidez, Alekesam, Waker, Malcom London, Goody Grace
- New Music on Tap Lounge: Unbreakable Bloodline, Creature Comfort, Ruen Brothers, Urban Cone, Cloves

=== Sunday, June 11 ===
- What Stage: White Reaper, Royal Blood, Milky Chance, Lorde, The Weeknd
- Which Stage: Cam, Margo Price, Umphrey's McGee, Crystal Castles, Travis Scott
- This Tent: Tank and the Bangas, Noname, Dua Lipa, Aminé, Flatbush Zombies, BadBadNotGood
- That Tent: River Whyless, Aaron Lee Tasjan, Mandolin Orange, Greensky Bluegrass, Superjam
- The Other: Case Bloom, Jason Huber, Vanic, Skepta, Borgore, Yellow Claw
- Who Stage: Flint Eastwood, Yoshi Flower, Tucker Beathard, Ella Vos, Jacob Collier
- New Music on Tap Lounge: Backup Planet, Baskery, Sweet Crude, Ethan Gruska, Njomza
