= Red Hill Mining Town =

- 2017 Mix 12-inch picture disc

Song by U2

from the album The Joshua Tree
- Released: 9 March 1987; 22 April 2017 (2017 mix)
- Genre: Rock
- Length: 4:52
- Label: Island
- Composer: U2
- Lyricist: Bono
- Producers: Daniel Lanois; Brian Eno

Music video
- "Red Hill Mining Town" on YouTube

"Red Hill Mining Town" is a song by the rock band U2. It is the sixth track from their 1987 album, The Joshua Tree. A rough version of this song was worked on during the early Joshua Tree album writing sessions in 1985. The focus of the song is on the National Union of Mineworkers' 1984 strike in Great Britain that occurred in response to the National Coal Board's campaign to close unprofitable mines. A music video was produced in February 1987 for the song and was directed by Neil Jordan. The song was planned for release as the album's second single, but it was ultimately shelved in favour of "I Still Haven't Found What I'm Looking For".

A new mix of the song by producer Steve Lillywhite was released as a single in April 2017.

== Background and recording ==
In 1984, the National Union of Mineworkers declared a strike in response to the British National Coal Board's decision to close down a large swathe of the United Kingdom's coal mines, which had become unprofitable. The Margaret Thatcher government vehemently opposed the strike. The dispute led to civil discord politically, socially, and in violent confrontations between trade union pickets and the United Kingdom's police forces in the affected areas. This was one of the most divisive and bitter civic conflicts in Britain in the 20th Century, and its social and economic impact on the working-class coal-mining-based communities in Wales, across the English Midlands and the North was severe.

In 1984, Bob Dylan played at Slane Castle in Ireland. U2 singer Bono interviewed him for Hot Press magazine and Dylan invited Bono to sing on stage with him. The meeting confirmed for Bono, whose "record collection started in 1976", how much he still had to learn about the traditions of singing, songwriting, and musicianship. A friendship developed between Bono and Dylan with Bono delving into Dylan's back catalogue and retracing the connections between Irish and American folk music. He was also listening to the blue-collar labour songs of Bruce Springsteen. U2's growing awareness of folk traditions was reflected in their performance at a 25th anniversary tribute on The Late Late Show to folk veterans the Dubliners. U2 performed Peggy Seeger's "Springhill Mining Disaster" which tells the story of a mining disaster in Nova Scotia.

These strands came together in "Red Hill Mining Town", a rough version of which was worked up during the early Joshua Tree album writing sessions in late 1985. Bono's lyrics focused on the stress the dispute had on families and their relationships, many of which broke down. In particular, inspiration was drawn from the Tony Parker book Red Hill: A Mining Community. Bono was criticised in some quarters for not being politically specific enough. However, Bono said he felt he was more interested in the relationships and that others were more qualified to comment on the strike itself.

During recording, Bono was displeased with an early vocal take and wondered why his voice made him sound "like a rich man with pound notes stuffed in his pockets when it's a song about unemployment". The audio engineer determined that the stereo plate reverb effect that had been added to the vocals was contributing to this feeling, and as a result, it was removed.

Ultimately, U2 were not completely satisfied with the final result; producer Steve Lillywhite, who mixed the track, said, "It never got finished the way they wanted it. They always thought it could be a little bit better." One of the issues was that the brass accompaniment played by the Arklow Silver Band was considered out of tune. As a result, Lillywhite was told to raise the synthesiser track in the mix, as "in 1986, we were very impressed that you could get really good sounding brass instruments out of a keyboard."

=== 2017 mix ===
For the 30th anniversary reissue of The Joshua Tree in 2017, new mixes of several songs were created, including "Red Hill Mining Town". The 2017 mix of the song was worked on using stems from the original recording; the band and Lillywhite communicated over e-mail, as the producer was residing in Indonesia. Looking back on the original mix, Lillywhite believed it was a mistake to de-emphasize the brass, saying of the synthesiser, "yes it's a good sound, but sometimes the sound is not as important as the spirit." Since the brass was recorded on just two tracks, Lillywhite could not Auto-Tune the recording. Instead, he turned up the horns based on a recommendation that Rolling Stones guitarist Keith Richards made 30 years earlier. Whenever Richards' guitar would get out of tune over the course of a take, instead of lowering the instrument in the mix and covering it with an overdub, he would turn it up so that, despite sounding out of tune, it would "own the sound". Describing the new mix of "Red Hill Mining Town", Lillywhite said, "the brass band is much more emotive than someone playing it on a keyboard".

Other changes for the new mix were complicated by audio spill; U2 had recorded the song as a single studio performance, resulting in the drums leaking onto the bass guitar amplifier track. Guitarist the Edge asked Lillywhite to raise the guitar in the mix. Bono, believing he could sing the song better and with more sincerity, told Lillywhite, "I hate the singer", and subsequently re-recorded his vocals for the verses. Lillywhite said, "I actually had to match a 56-year-old Bono with a 26-year-old Bono and they mixed well. I was very happy. It's quite powerful sounding."

== Aborted single release and live performances ==
A music video for the song was produced in February 1987 in London and directed by Neil Jordan. It was filmed on a set representing an underground mine. The video was included on the bonus DVD of the 20th Anniversary Super Deluxe Box reissue of The Joshua Tree.

The song was initially planned for release as The Joshua Tree's second single, but U2 were unhappy with the video and Bono was unable to sing the high notes during pre-Joshua Tree Tour rehearsals. The song was dropped as a single and "I Still Haven't Found What I'm Looking For" became a late choice for the second single. U2 drummer Larry Mullen Jr. later described it as "one of the lost songs" and that while he thought it had had great potential, it was "over-produced and under-written". While Bono had clear ideas on how he wanted it to sound during The Joshua Tree sessions, Mullen recalls that the rest of the band and production crew were "[not] sure where he was going with it."

For 30 years it was known as the only song from The Joshua Tree never to be played live, although it was soundchecked in November 1987. In 2017, the band embarked on the Joshua Tree Tour 2017, playing the album in its entirety, and as a result, the song was played live for the first time.

== Critical reception ==
Bill Graham of Hot Press contrasted the song with two of the album's other ballads, "I Still Haven't Found What I'm Looking For" and "Running to Stand Still", describing it as the album's "most cluttered and literal, least mysterious and open-ended track". He said the blocked harmonies show the band "striving too ambitiously and conventionally for effect" and likened the song to a "scarf-waving variant of 'Sailing' written for the National Union of Mineworkers". He described the melody, however, as "undeniably potent and infectious", and he praised the band's good intentions in writing about the mining strikes. Niall Stokes said that the song "capture[ed] eloquently [...] the sense of doom that surrounded the death of the small close-knit mining communities".

== See also ==
- List of covers of U2 songs – Red Hill Mining Town
- "We Work the Black Seam", 1985 Sting song about the miners' strike.
