= Trip Through Your Wires =

Song by U2

from the album The Joshua Tree
- Released: 9 March 1987
- Genre: Blues rock; country rock
- Length: 3:32
- Label: Island
- Composer: U2
- Lyricist: Bono
- Producers: Daniel Lanois; Brian Eno

"Trip Through Your Wires" is a song by the Irish rock band U2 and the eighth track on their 1987 album, The Joshua Tree. The song has a bluesy rhythm and features lead singer Bono on harmonica.

== Recording ==
In 1986, an early version of this song, containing different lyrics, was performed on the RTÉ programme TV GAGA.

During the song's recording for the album, the producer Daniel Lanois played the Omnichord, an electronic autoharp. He plugged it into the equipment of the guitarist the Edge, using his delay effect units and guitar amplifier. Lanois said it sounded like an organ "jangling in the background".

== Release ==
The song was released as a promotional single in Australia, with only 500 hand-numbered copies released. The single included the B-sides "Luminous Times (Hold on to Love)", "Spanish Eyes" and "Silver and Gold".

"Trip Through Your Wires" was played live throughout the Joshua Tree Tour, but was not played again until The Joshua Tree Tour 2017 during the set where the album is played in its entirety.

According to The Edge, the song was meant to be heard in the context of another song that never made it on the album, "The Sweetest Thing", which was later released as the B-side of "Where the Streets Have No Name". "The Sweetest Thing" was re-recorded and released as a single for the 1998 compilation album The Best of 1980–1990.
