= U2360° at the Rose Bowl =

2010 concert film by U2

Video by U2
- Released: 3 June 2010
- Recorded: 25 October 2009
- Venue: Rose Bowl (Pasadena, California)
- Genre: Rock
- Length: 131 minutes
- Labels: Mercury; Interscope
- Director: Tom Krueger
- Producers: Katherine Allen; Ned O'Hanlon

U2 chronology
Artificial Horizon (2009)	U2360° at the Rose Bowl (2010)	Wide Awake in Europe (2010)

U2360° at the Rose Bowl is a 2010 concert film by Irish rock band U2. It was shot on 25 October 2009 at the Rose Bowl in Pasadena, California, during the band's U2 360° Tour. The Rose Bowl concert featured a sold-out crowd of 97,014 people, breaking the US record for single concert attendance for one headline act. It was live streamed over the Internet via YouTube, and was later released on DVD and Blu-ray on 3 June 2010 in the United States, 7 June in the United Kingdom, and 8 June in Canada. It received generally positive reviews from critics.

== Background ==
The U2 360° Tour was a worldwide concert tour by the Irish rock band U2, launched in support of the group's 2009 album No Line on the Horizon. The tour was designed by Willie Williams, who has worked on every U2 tour since 1982. Mark Fisher was the architect. The tour featured a 360-degree configuration, with the stage being placed closer to the center of the stadium's field than usual. Williams had been toying with ideas for 360-degree stadium staging for U2 for a number of years, and presented sketches of a four-legged design to the group near the end of their Vertigo Tour in 2006. The inspiration for the "spaceship-on-four-legs" design, nicknamed "the Claw", came from the landmark Theme Building at Los Angeles International Airport.

The initial tour dates were formally announced in March 2009. U2 played 44 shows in 2009, with an additional 38 concerts scheduled for 2010. The performance in Pasadena was the group's penultimate concert of 2009.

== Filming ==
The 25 October 2009 concert in Pasadena, California was streamed live on U2's YouTube channel, the first time a concert was streamed live on YouTube. The feed was initially set to be restricted to 16 countries but was later made available worldwide. Over 10 million viewers streamed the concert, making it the largest streaming event in the website's history.

The shoot was directed by Tom Krueger, who had previously worked with the band on the film U2 3D. Following the success of U2 3D, show director Willie Williams asked Krueger to design the photography and video coverage for the U2 360° Tour. Originally 13 cameras were used for filming close-ups during the tour; however, Kruger added additional cameras for the Rose Bowl concert, resulting in a total of 27 cameras for the shoot. The additional cameras were used for crane shots and capturing footage of the audience. The show's attendance reached 97,014 people, breaking the US record for single concert attendance for one headline act, a mark U2 previously held.

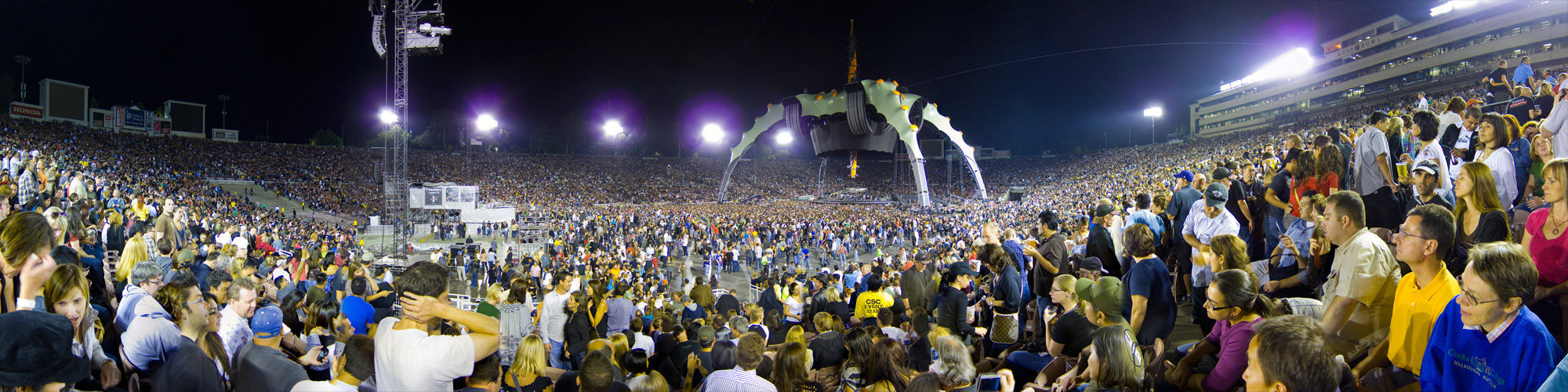
The show that was filmed for the video set an American record for largest concert attendance for a single headline act.

== Release ==
U2360° at the Rose Bowl was released on 3 June 2010 in the United States and 7 June in the United Kingdom. Four different formats were available, including standard DVD, deluxe DVD, a super deluxe box-set, and Blu-ray Disc. It is the first U2 concert available on Blu-ray. The DVD release was available in one- and two-disc formats, the latter which featured bonus features. Both releases featured the concert with a PCM stereo soundtrack, as well as DTS and Dolby Digital surround sound. The Blu-ray Disc release features the concert in 1080i with a DTS-HD Master Audio soundtrack, as well as PCM stereo.

The bonus disc of content included with the deluxe and super deluxe editions contains the U2 360° Tour documentary Squaring the Circle directed by Tom Kelly, Tour Clips directed by Cutter Hodierne, and a timelapse video of a concert in Berlin. "Breathe" opened the concert in Pasadena, but was cut from the regular release; it is included as a bonus track. Other bonus material includes the music video "Get On Your Boots", the video for "Magnificent", the animated and live-action videos for "I'll Go Crazy If I Don't Go Crazy Tonight", and the making-of videos for "Get On Your Boots" and "Magnificent".

The standard release contains the concert only, while the deluxe release has the concert and the bonus disc. The super deluxe boxset includes a 32-page hardback book; a limited edition 2-disc DVD of U2360° at the Rose Bowl plus 2 hours of bonus material; a Blu-ray of U2360° at the Rose Bowl plus 2 hours of bonus material; a 7-inch vinyl containing the previously unreleased song "Soon", which was played on tour preceding the band's arrival on stage and was previously titled "Kingdom of Your Love"; three U2 360° guitar picks; the Tour Programme; a limited edition numbered drawing of the final stage design; and five art prints in an embossed wallet. The Blu-ray release contains bonus live features; footage from the forthcoming 2010 North American and European legs of the tour will be available to download to the Blu-ray player through an exclusive live feature on the disc.

== Reception ==
Professional ratings
Review scores
Source	Rating
Allmusic	3.5/5 stars
The Austin Chronicle	2/5 stars
Bristol Evening Post	9/10
Daily Record (Scotland)	4/5 stars
Inthenews.co.uk	8/10
The Irish Times	4/5 stars
News Limited	4/5 stars
Philadelphia Daily News	A−
Q	4/4 stars
The Sydney Morning Herald	3.5/5 stars

U2360° at the Rose Bowl was well received by critics. The Irish Times gave the film 4 out of 5 stars, mainly praising the staging in the film and how it "houses everything required to make a good band seem great". Scotland's Daily Record said that the release was not U2's best "but still pretty damn good". Inthenews.co.uk compared the release to U2's performances of the 1980s and the more powerful vocals of the time, but said that the band "make up for it with a revolutionary stage, top-rate musical ability and plethora of instantly recognisable tracks". Andrew Mueller of Uncut felt that the concert was well-translated onto a home video release, and praised the political aspects of the film, but called the final song of the film—"Moment of Surrender"—an "[i]ll-chosen closer" and "overlong and under-realised". Entertainment Weekly called the concert set "groundbreaking", and ranked U2360° at the Rose Bowl at number one on "The Must List" for the week prior to its release. Raoul Hernandez of The Austin Chronicle said the band "redeems its stillborn No Line on the Horizon with this two-saucer Close Encounters of the Third Kind", adding, "As disembodied as the two-hour Universal Studios ride becomes, U2 fires on all boosters".

The Associated Press felt the video release of the concert was much better than its original live stream on YouTube, and stated that the concert showed the band "well-rehearsed and in good form", although criticized how Bono's voice was "audibly hoarse" in several songs. The Sydney Morning Herald said that the concert's songs from No Line on the Horizon "stand out for freshness" and referred to the performances of "MLK" and "One" as a "lovely interlude". Cameron Adams of various News Limited-published papers cited "The Unforgettable Fire" and "Moment of Surrender" as highlights of the concert, and said of the concert as a whole, "In a word: Enormous." Q gave the film a maximum score of four stars, saying the video proves that "The Claw is indeed breathtaking", and that "U2 are far too experienced to let themselves be overshadowed by the world's most expensive Doctor Who prop. It's the songs rather than the spectacle that drives the show."

== Track listing ==
All lyrics are written by Bono; all music is composed by U2, except where noted.

No.	Title	Lyrics	Music	Length
1.	"Get On Your Boots"			3:50
2.	"Magnificent"	Bono; The Edge	U2; Brian Eno; Daniel Lanois	5:35
3.	"Mysterious Ways"			4:37
4.	"Beautiful Day"			7:19
5.	"I Still Haven't Found What I'm Looking For"			5:38
6.	"Stuck in a Moment You Can't Get Out Of"	Bono; The Edge		4:40
7.	"No Line on the Horizon"		U2; Eno; Lanois	4:17
8.	"Elevation"			3:38
9.	"In a Little While"			4:00
10.	"Unknown Caller"	U2; Eno; Lanois	U2; Eno; Lanois	5:53
11.	"Until the End of the World"			4:56
12.	"The Unforgettable Fire"			4:45
13.	"City of Blinding Lights"			5:20
14.	"Vertigo"	Bono; The Edge		4:23
15.	"I'll Go Crazy If I Don't Go Crazy Tonight"			5:25
16.	"Sunday Bloody Sunday"			6:36
17.	"MLK"			1:02
18.	"Walk On"			6:37
19.	"One" (Preceded by recorded speech by Desmond Tutu)			6:59
20.	"Amazing Grace" / "Where the Streets Have No Name"			6:59
21.	"Ultraviolet (Light My Way)"			5:14
22.	"With or Without You"			5:36
23.	"Moment of Surrender"		U2; Eno; Lanois	7:38
Total length:				120:57

The show is preceded by an introduction montage, showing the "babyface" (from the cover of Zooropa), complete with a helmet, staring at a screen of U2 photographs inside a space ship.

== Actual set list ==
The following is the set list for the Rose Bowl concert, featuring songs not included in the concert film:

1. "Soon" (played over public address system)
2. "Breathe"
3. "Get on Your Boots"
4. "Magnificent"
5. "Mysterious Ways"
6. "Beautiful Day"
7. "I Still Haven't Found What I'm Looking For"
8. "Stuck in a Moment You Can't Get Out Of"
9. "No Line on the Horizon"
10. "Elevation"
11. "In a Little While"
12. "Unknown Caller"
13. "Until the End of the World"
14. "The Unforgettable Fire"
15. "City of Blinding Lights"
16. "Vertigo"
17. "I'll Go Crazy If I Don't Go Crazy Tonight"
18. "Sunday Bloody Sunday"
19. "MLK"
20. "Walk On"
21. "One"
22. "Where the Streets Have No Name"
23. "Ultraviolet (Light My Way)"
24. "With or Without You"
25. "Moment of Surrender"

== Personnel ==
U2

- Bono – vocals, rhythm guitar
- The Edge – lead guitar, keyboards, backing vocals
- Adam Clayton – bass guitar
- Larry Mullen Jr. – drums, percussion, backing vocals

Additional performers

- Terry Lawless – keyboards, programming

Technical

- Director – Tom Krueger
- Producers – Katherine Allen, Ned O'Hanlon
- Executive producers – Malcolm Gerrie, Paul McGuinness
- Show designer/director – Willie Williams
- Music recording – Declan Gaffney, Jay Vicari
- Music producer/mixing – Carl Glanville
- Mastering – Scott Sedillo (at Bernie Grundman Mastering)

== Charts ==
=== Weekly charts ===
Chart (2010)	Peak position
Argentina Top 20 DVDs	1
Australian Music DVD (ARIA)	1
Austrian Music DVD (Ö3 Austria)	1
Belgian Music DVD (Ultratop Flanders)	1
Belgian Music DVD (Ultratop Wallonia)	1
Danish Music DVD (Hitlisten)	1
Dutch Music DVD (MegaCharts)	1
Finnish Music DVD (Suomen virallinen lista)	1
German Albums (Offizielle Top 100)	3
German Top 20 Music DVDs (Offizielle Top 100)	1
Hungarian DVDs (MAHASZ)	1
Ireland Top 20 DVDs (IRMA)	2
Italian Music DVD (FIMI)	1
Japanese DVDs Chart (Oricon)	33
New Zealand Top 10 Music DVDs	1
Norwegian Top 10 DVDs	1
Portuguese Top 30 Music DVDs	1
Spanish Music DVD (Promusicae)	1
Swedish Music DVD (Sverigetopplistan)	1
Swiss Music DVD (Schweizer Hitparade)	1
UK Music Videos (Official Charts)	1
US Music Videos (Billboard)	1

=== Year-end charts ===
Chart (2010)	Position
Australian Music DVD (ARIA)	3
Belgian Music DVD (Ultratop Flanders)	3
Belgian Music DVD (Ultratop Wallonia)	3
Dutch Music DVD (MegaCharts)	2
French Music DVD (SNEP)	5
German Music DVD (Offizielle Top 100)	61
Irish Music DVD (IRMA)	2
Spanish Music DVD (Promusicae)	7
Swedish Music DVD (Sverigetopplistan)	3
US Music Video Sales (Billboard)	6

Chart (2011)	Position
Australian Music DVD (ARIA)	44
Belgian Music DVD (Ultratop Flanders)	11
Belgian Music DVD (Ultratop Wallonia)	9
Dutch Music DVD (MegaCharts)	16
Swedish Music DVD (Sverigetopplistan)	7
US Music Video Sales (Billboard)	8

Chart (2012)	Position
Belgian Music DVD (Ultratop Flanders)	24
Belgian Music DVD (Ultratop Wallonia)	33
Swedish Music DVD (Sverigetopplistan)	36

Chart (2013)	Position
Swedish Music DVD (Sverigetopplistan)	69

Chart (2015)	Position
Swedish Music DVD (Sverigetopplistan)	66

== Certifications ==
Region	Certification	Certified units/sales
Australia (ARIA)	3× Platinum	45,000^{^}
Austria (IFPI Austria)	Platinum	10,000^{*}
Brazil (Pro-Música Brasil)	Diamond	125,000^{*}
Canada (Music Canada)	5× Platinum	50,000^{^}
Germany (BVMI)	3× Gold	75,000^{^}
Ireland (IRMA)	2× Platinum	8,000^{^}
New Zealand (RMNZ)	Platinum	5,000^{^}
Poland (ZPAV)	Platinum	10,000^{*}
Portugal (AFP)	2× Platinum	16,000^{^}
Spain (Promusicae)	Platinum	25,000^{^}
Switzerland (IFPI Switzerland)	Gold	3,000^{^}
United Kingdom (BPI)	Gold	25,000^{^}
^{*} Sales figures based on certification alone.^{^} Shipments figures based on certification alone.
