= Artificial Horizon (album) =

Remix album by U2
- Released: March 2010
- Genres: Rock; dance; electronic
- Length: 62:32
- Label: Island

U2 chronology
No Line on the Horizon (2009)	Artificial Horizon (2010)	U2360° at the Rose Bowl (2010)

Artificial Horizon is a compilation album of remixed tracks by rock band U2. It was released exclusively to subscribing members of U2.com, replacing Medium, Rare & Remastered. The remix CD is of a similar vein to the band's 1995 release Melon: Remixes for Propaganda, which was also released exclusively to fans. A triple-vinyl edition was released to the general public until 14 May 2010; this version included an MP3 for the Snow Patrol remix of the song "Unknown Caller".

== Composition ==
Artificial Horizon includes thirteen remixed tracks spanning the most recent fifteen years of the band's career, including three which were previously unreleased. The opening track, "Elevation" (Influx mix) was taken from the 2001 single "Elevation". It was produced by Brian Eno and Daniel Lanois, and includes synthesizers played by Eno and guitarist The Edge. The remix was performed by Leo Pearson. "Elevation" (Influx mix) was always played over the PA system as the band took the stage on the Elevation Tour. The Jacknife Lee mix of "Fast Cars" was first released on the 2005 single "All Because of You". The original studio version, a bonus track on some versions of the 2004 album How to Dismantle an Atomic Bomb, was produced by Steve Lillywhite. The Jacknife Lee remix includes additional keyboards played by Jacknife Lee. "Get on Your Boots" (Fish Out of Water mix) is a previously unreleased track; the song was remixed by Declan Gaffney and Matt Paul.

"Vertigo" (Trent Reznor remix) was taken from the 2005 single "Sometimes You Can't Make It on Your Own". Produced by Lillywhite, the track was remixed by Trent Reznor. The guitar part for "Native Son", an early version of "Vertigo", is interspersed throughout the song. Produced by Eno and Lanois, "Magnificent" (Fred Falke radio mix) was first released on the 2009 single "Magnificent". The track was remixed by Fred Falke, who plays additional keyboards in the piece. "I'll Go Crazy If I Don't Go Crazy Tonight" (Live U2360 remix) is the second track which had previously been unreleased, although the studio version (remixed by Redanka and Dirty South) was included on the single "I'll Go Crazy If I Don't Go Crazy Tonight" as the Redanka's Kick the Darkness mix. The track was recorded by Alastair McMillan on 27 July 2009 at Croke Park in Dublin, Ireland, on the first leg of the U2 360° Tour. Singer Bono includes snippets of the Frankie Goes to Hollywood songs "Relax" and "Two Tribes" at the beginning and end of the song. "Beshno Az Ney/Windfall", performed by Iranian singer Sussan Deyhim, is sampled at the end as the track fades out.

The David Holmes remix of "Beautiful Day" was included on the "Elevation" single. Produced by Lanois and Eno, the track was remixed by David Holmes and features additional keyboards by Darren Morris, additional guitar and bass guitar by Phil Mossman, and additional drums by Zac Danziger. With the exception of a few backing vocals in the final minute, the song is entirely instrumental. "Staring at the Sun" (Monster Truck remix) was first released on the 1997 single "Staring at the Sun". It was produced by Flood and remixed by The Sonic Morticians, with additional keyboards played by Steve Osbourne. The Danny Saber mix of "Happiness Is a Warm Gun" was taken from the 1997 single "Last Night on Earth". Produced by Flood, it was remixed by Danny Saber.

"Get on Your Boots" (Justice remix) was originally released as a b-side to the "Magnificent" single. The track was remixed by the French band Justice. The Hot Chip 2006 remix of "City of Blinding Lights" is the third previously unreleased track. Produced by Flood, it was remixed by Hot Chip. The track "If God Will Send His Angels" (Grand Jury mix) was taken from the 1997 single "Mofo". The track was produced by Flood, Howie B, and Steve Osbourne, and was remixed by Gerald Baillergeau. "Staring at the Sun" (Brothers in Rhythm Ambient mix) was taken from a 2002 promotional release for The Best of 1990-2000. Mixed by Brothers in Rhythm, it uses a live version of "Staring at the Sun" taken from the PopHeart EP as the basis for the mix instead of the studio version.

== Reception ==
James Sims of the Huffington Post had a favourable impression of Artificial Horizon, noting that although "[u]ltimately, the album is for the fans... there are plenty of gems to be found". He also wrote that the album "proves U2 is unafraid to embrace experimentation, a facet of the band's personality that continues to be successful."

== Track listing ==
Artificial Horizon track listing
No.	Title	Lyrics	Music	Length
1.	"Elevation" (Influx mix)	Bono	U2	4:04
2.	"Fast Cars" (Jacknife Lee mix)	Bono; The Edge	U2	3:30
3.	"Get on Your Boots" (Fish Out of Water mix)	U2	U2	3:47
4.	"Vertigo" (Trent Reznor remix)	Bono; The Edge	U2	3:39
5.	"Magnificent" (Falke Radio mix)	Bono; The Edge	U2; Brian Eno; Daniel Lanois	4:02
6.	"I'll Go Crazy If I Don't Go Crazy Tonight" (Live U2360 remix)	Bono	U2	6:47
7.	"Beautiful Day" (David Holmes remix)	Bono	U2	5:37
8.	"Staring at the Sun" (Monster Truck remix)	Bono; The Edge	U2	5:09
9.	"Happiness Is a Warm Gun" (Danny Saber mix)	John Lennon; Paul McCartney	Lennon; McCartney, performed by U2	4:54
10.	"Get on Your Boots" (Justice remix)	U2	U2	3:29
11.	"City of Blinding Lights" (Hot Chip 2006 remix)	Bono	U2	6:19
12.	"If God Will Send His Angels" (Grand Jury mix)	Bono; The Edge	U2	5:46
13.	"Staring at the Sun" (Brothers in Rhythm Ambient mix)	Bono; The Edge	U2	5:29
Total length:				62:32

Bonus track (vinyl purchase)
No.	Title	Lyrics	Music	Length
14.	"Unknown Caller" (Snow Patrol remix)	U2; Eno; Lanois	U2; Eno; Lanois	4:35
Total length:				67:00
