= Linear (film) =

- DVD cover
- Directed by: Anton Corbijn
- Story by: Anton Corbijn; Bono
- Produced by: Iain Canning; Emile Sherman
- Starring: Saïd Taghmaoui
- Cinematography: Martin Ruhe
- Edited by: James Rose
- Music by: U2; Brian Eno; Danny Lanois
- Production company: See-Saw Films
- Distributed by: Universal Music Group
- Release date: 9 March 2009
- Running time: 57 minutes
- Language: English

Linear is a 2009 film directed by Anton Corbijn. The film includes music from U2's 2009 studio album, No Line on the Horizon, and was included on both digital and DVD formats with several editions of the album.

== Development ==
The idea behind the film originated from a U2 video shoot in June 2007. During the shoot, Corbijn asked the band to remain still while he filmed them; this created a "photograph on the film", in which U2 did not move but the objects around them did. Impressed, the band believed that the listening experience could be enhanced with visuals, and in May 2008 they commissioned Corbijn to create the film. The film was created as a companion to No Line on the Horizon, and Corbijn has claimed that the film is not a music video, but rather "a new way to listen to a record" and "a new way to use film to connect to music".

The plot is based on the characters Bono created for the album No Line on the Horizon, with the story revolving around a Parisian motorcycle cop who has become disillusioned with his life, as well as the conflict between immigrants and the police in the city, causing him to leave and see his girlfriend in Tripoli. The film features a mix of black-and-white and colour filming, and runs for 58:20. Linear was completed in time for the album's original November 2008 release date, but as the band continued to work into December the film became out of sequence with the album. 10 of the 11 songs in the film were edited as a solution, and the original running order was kept intact. The film features Saïd Taghmaoui as the cop, Lizzie Brocheré as the waitress, Marta Barrio as the lone dancer, and Francisco Javier Malia Vazquez as the barman.

== Plot ==
The Parisian cop (Taghmaoui) prepares to cross the Mediterranean Sea to get to Tripoli ("Cedars of Lebanon").

The film opens with a scene of Paris as night falls, before moving on to a journey through the city streets ("Unknown Caller"). At the end of the trip through Paris, a motorcycle cop (Taghmaoui) sits on his police-issued motorcycle, staring at some graffiti on a wall which reads "Fuck the Police" in French. Kicking his bike over, he pours petrol on it, sets it alight, and watches it burn ("Breathe"). As dawn breaks, he gets on his own motorcycle and begins his journey through the French countryside before crossing into Spain, aiming to see his girlfriend in Tripoli ("Winter"). Pulling off for a break part-way through the journey, the cop lies on his back and watches a cloud form the image of the African continent before falling asleep ("White as Snow"). Waking up, he resumes his journey across Spain ("No Line on the Horizon").

Upon coming to a town, he pulls off for lunch and enters a small café which, with the exception of the waitress (Brocheré), is devoid of people ("Fez – Being Born"). Bored, the waitress flicks on the television and they watch a U2 music video ("Magnificent"). Resuming his journey, the cop travels through the countryside until making a stop in Cádiz ("Stand Up Comedy"). Walking into a bar, the cop attracts the attention of a woman who begins to dance (Barrio), while the barman (Vazquez) serves him several drinks. Leaving the dancer his keys on the table, the cop goes to leave the bar, but as he does so he looks through a peephole and observes several women with moustaches dancing ("Get on Your Boots"). Walking alone through the streets and with no place to stay overnight, he makes his way down to the beach and falls asleep on the sand ("Moment of Surrender"). Waking up in the morning, he rents a rowboat and begins to paddle his way across the Mediterranean Sea to Tripoli ("Cedars of Lebanon").

== Track listing ==
The film contains 11 tracks, 10 of which are from No Line on the Horizon. The order of the songs was rearranged from the order of the album. "Winter", a track cut from No Line on the Horizon, is in the film while "I'll Go Crazy If I Don't Go Crazy Tonight" is not. The film's running order is representative of No Line on the Horizon's track list as of May 2008.

No.	Title	Length
1.	"Unknown Caller"	6:19
2.	"Breathe"	4:37
3.	"Winter"	6:18
4.	"White as Snow"	4:47
5.	"No Line on the Horizon"	4:11
6.	"Fez – Being Born"	5:15
7.	"Magnificent"	5:24
8.	"Stand Up Comedy"	3:50
9.	"Get on Your Boots"	3:28
10.	"Moment of Surrender"	7:24
11.	"Cedars of Lebanon"	4:15
12.	"Credits"	2:29
Total length:		58:17
