= Breathe (U2 song) =

Song by U2

from the album No Line on the Horizon
- Released: 27 February 2009
- Genre: Rock
- Length: 5:00
- Label: Island
- Composer: U2
- Lyricist: Bono
- Producers: Steve Lillywhite, with additional production by Daniel Lanois and Brian Eno

Audio sample
- file; help

"Breathe" is a song by Irish rock band U2 and the tenth track on their 2009 album No Line on the Horizon. The lyrics detail an outburst from the song's narrator. The song was developed primarily by guitarist the Edge, with musical influences from Jimmy Page and Jack White. The track was mixed numerous times before the band decided to rewrite it.

== Writing and recording ==
The song was initially developed by the Edge, with co-writer and producer Daniel Lanois noting "he had that pretty intact without our involvement." Several of the guitar riffs were influenced by Jimmy Page of Led Zeppelin and Jack White of The White Stripes, who the Edge collaborated with in the 2009 film It Might Get Loud. The band worked on one version of the song with producers Brian Eno and Daniel Lanois for a long time before the band scrapped and recreated it. Eno had referred to the demo version as one of his favorite U2 songs of all time. After rewriting the song, U2 asked Steve Lillywhite to mix it. Eno estimated that the song was remixed 80 times during the album sessions. Two sets of lyrics were worked on during the song's many various incarnations. The first version was about Nelson Mandela, and the second was "more surreal and personal". The band eventually decided on using the latter for the song.

"Breathe" was one of five songs, along with "Magnificent", "Get on Your Boots", "I'll Go Crazy If I Don't Go Crazy Tonight", and "Unknown Caller" recorded by a fan outside of Bono's house during the No Line on the Horizon sessions. The clips were subsequently uploaded to YouTube, but removed at the request of Universal Music.

The song takes place on 16 June, an intentional reference to Bloomsday, the date on which the James Joyce novel Ulysses is set. When writing the lyrics, Bono wanted the song to "become more intimate... I want to get away from subject and subject matter into pure exchange. Not even conversation. Often, it's just like grunts or outbursts." He noted that on "Breathe" the listener is "right there in the middle of this outburst." During the No Line on the Horizon sessions, he developed several characters to tell the songs' stories for him. The narrator within "Breathe" is one of the few of these characters who ultimately finds redemption.

== Composition ==
"Breathe" begins with a faded-in, mixed down drum solo by drummer Larry Mullen Jr. and a cello part by Caroline Dale, before the other instrumental parts join in. The song is written in a 12/8 time signature, and played at a tempo of 78 beats per minute.

== Appearances in other media ==
"Breathe" appears as the second track in the Anton Corbijn film Linear, based on a story by Corbijn and Bono in which a Parisian traffic cop travels across France and the Mediterranean Sea to visit his girlfriend in Tripoli. During the sequence, the cop, played by Saïd Taghmaoui, knocks over his police-issued motorcycle, sets it on fire, and watches it burn. It ends with the officer getting on his own motorcycle and setting off on his journey, where the next track, "Winter", begins.

== Live performances ==
"Breathe" was first performed live on the No Line on the Horizon promotional tour during an appearance on the French television program Le Grand Journal. It was played at several other promotional events leading up to the album's release, including a Live Lounge session for BBC Radio 1, on CBS-TV's Late Show with David Letterman, and a short set at Fordham University. The song was debuted on tour in Barcelona as the opening song at the first concert on the U2 360° Tour, on 30 June 2009. "Breathe" was also performed as the opening song at 43 of the 44 concerts on the first two legs of U2 360° Tour. The song's performance in Pasadena, California was omitted from the concert's video release, U2 360° at the Rose Bowl, but was included on some editions as a bonus track. On September 26, 2009, U2 performed the song on Saturday Night Live.

The Edge described "Breathe" as a "fuck-off live rocker".

== Reception ==
"Breathe" received mainly positive reviews from music critics. Brian Eno said that the song was one of the best the band had ever written. Rolling Stone speculated that the closing lyrics reflected Bono's feelings in being a member of U2, calling the track "hard-rock clatter." Allmusic had a favourable impression of the song, stating "U2 strike that unmistakable blend of soaring, widescreen sonics and unflinching openhearted emotion that's been their trademark, turning the intimate into something hauntingly universal." Q said the track's position alongside "White as Snow" and "Cedars of Lebanon" at the end of the album gave No Line on the Horizon "its twist in the tail", describing the song as "all jungle rumble drums and crashing guitars." Entertainment Weekly enjoyed the song, calling it an "instant classic" while describing it as a "stomping, snarling rumination about engaging the world with open arms despite so much external gloom and internal angst." NME labelled the lyrics "twaddle", but called it the band's best song since "Stuck in a Moment You Can't Get Out Of". Pitchfork had a negative impression of the song, stating that some of the lyrics sound "like a cop-out from a man who spent so much time struggling with salvation."

== Personnel ==
U2

- Bono – vocals, guitar
- The Edge – guitar, backing vocals, piano
- Adam Clayton – bass guitar
- Larry Mullen Jr. – drums, percussion

Additional performers

- Brian Eno – rhythm loops, programming, synthesizers, vocals
- Danny Lanois – guitar, vocals
- Caroline Dale – cello
- Terry Lawless – additional keyboards

Technical

- Production – Steve Lillywhite
- Additional production – Danny Lanois, Brian Eno
- Engineering – Declan Gaffney
- Engineering assistance – Tom Hough
- Additional engineering – CJ Eiriksson
- Mixing – CJ Eiriksson, Steve Lillywhite
- Mixing assistance – Dave Emery

== See also ==
- List of covers of U2 songs - Breathe
