= Fez – Being Born =

Song by U2

from the album No Line on the Horizon
- Released: 27 February 2009
- Genre: Art rock
- Length: 5:17
- Label: Island
- Composers: U2, Brian Eno, and Daniel Lanois
- Lyricist: Bono
- Producers: Eno, Lanois

"Fez – Being Born" is a song by Irish rock band U2 and the eighth track on their 2009 album No Line on the Horizon. The group originally planned for the song to be sequenced as the opening track of the album, but they instead chose "No Line on the Horizon". During the recording sessions, "Fez – Being Born" had several different titles, including "Chromium Chords" and "Tripoli", and was the result of a fusion of two different songs.

== Writing and recording ==
"Fez – Being Born" was first developed in the No Line on the Horizon recording sessions with producer Rick Rubin in 2006. The symphonic guitar sound from the experimental "Fez" piece, the opening minute of the song, was created by guitarist the Edge during the recording of "The Saints Are Coming" with Green Day. When the band decided to work with producers Brian Eno and Daniel Lanois, most of the material from the Rick Rubin sessions was shelved. Lanois found the part and edited it into a tempo, adding in one of the beats developed by Eno before playing it for the band. After hearing the piece, Bono noted that "it was almost something coming to life. Like a flower opening or coming into the world."

Another song, "Being Born", was being worked on concurrently. The guitar in this was developed through a Death by Audio distortion box; the idea to use it was suggested to the Edge by Ben Curtis of the Secret Machines. Lanois suspected that the slow-tempo "Fez" would work well alongside the more energetic "Being Born". He edited "Being Born" so that it would be in the same key as "Fez" and placed the two together, creating the one song. At this time it was provisionally titled "Chromium Chords", and it was later renamed "Tripoli" before the band changed the name again to "Fez – Being Born". The "let me in the sound" chant from the song "Get on Your Boots" was edited into the "Fez" section at a low volume, serving as the song's opening lyric. By June 2008, the song was almost finished.

"Fez – Being Born" was originally planned to open the album, but the band eventually decided that the higher-energy "No Line on the Horizon" was a better selection.

== Composition ==
The sounds of a Moroccan marketplace were layered into the "Fez" section of the song. The New York Times described it as being composed of "ricocheting patterns". The Irish Independent called the song No Line on the Horizon's "most jarringly experimental moment".

== Live performances ==
"Fez – Being Born" appeared in some 2011 dates of the U2 360° Tour, as an interlude between the performances of "Miss Sarajevo" and "City of Blinding Lights".

== Appearances in other media ==
"Fez – Being Born" is the sixth track in the Anton Corbijn film Linear, based on a story by Corbijn and Bono where a Parisian traffic cop travels across France and the Mediterranean Sea to visit his girlfriend in Tripoli. During the sequence, the officer (Saïd Taghmaoui) is partway through his journey when he reaches a town. He stops for lunch and enters a small café which, with the exception of the waitress (Lizzie Brocheré), is devoid of people. He has a meal and turns his attention to the room's television, where the next track, "Magnificent", begins.

== Reception ==
Rolling Stone called it the "least linear song on the album", describing it as "a highway ride in flashback images dotted with Bono's wordless yelps and the descending ring of the Edge's guitar." Reviewer David Fricke felt that the closing verse was a metaphor for the band's songwriting process. Q thought that its location in the final third of the track list alongside "Breathe" helped to give the album "its twist in the tail." Blender enjoyed the song, stating it "rolls along on the melodic pointillism of minimalist composer Steve Reich."

Allmusic was disappointed with the song, believing that the band had overworked the track to the point where "the ideas collapse like a pyramid of cards." NME disliked the song, stating it "isn't nearly as daring as it thinks it is, merely a meandering slice of ambient doodling before kicking into gear as yet another mid-paced rocker." Spin felt that Bono's presence on the track was "mostly phonetic", noting that it seemed like he was "unsure of how to express himself in a musical context." Uncut felt that some of the song's elements were overwhelmed by the band's playing.
