= Unknown Caller =

Song by U2

from the album No Line on the Horizon
- Released: 27 February 2009
- Genre: Rock
- Length: 6:03
- Label: Island
- Songwriters: U2, Brian Eno, Daniel Lanois
- Producers: Brian Eno and Daniel Lanois, with additional production by Steve Lillywhite

"Unknown Caller" is a song by Irish rock band U2 and the fourth track on their 2009 album No Line on the Horizon. It was written from the perspective of a drug addict, who begins to receive bizarre text messages on his cellphone. The song was developed very early during the No Line on the Horizon sessions, and was recorded in a single take.

== Writing and recording ==
The No Line on the Horizon sessions began with two weeks of recording in Fez, Morocco. Recording took place in a rented courtyard of a hotel riad, which the band turned into a makeshift recording studio. "Unknown Caller" was recorded in a single take in this time, along with the songs "No Line on the Horizon", "Moment of Surrender", and "White as Snow". A few iterations of the track had previously been developed, but the "definitive version was only ever played once." Guitarist The Edge noted that they "were songs that pretty much came together in the space of a couple of hours, and therefore probably were played in the final incarnation maybe once or twice." Co-writer and producer Daniel Lanois noted that the song "pretty much had its personality intact from day one." The open-air riad allowed the band to hear the overhead birdsong during their sessions; this was taped and included in the introduction of the song. Towards the end of the recording sessions, producer Steve Lillywhite made a few minor changes to the song to make it "brilliant", including changes to the song's drumming and bassline.

In an interview with The Guardian, lead singer Bono stated that he became tired of writing in the first-person, noting that "I'd just worn myself out as a subject matter"; as a result he created several characters, including a traffic cop, a drug addict, and a soldier serving in Afghanistan. The drug addict character appears in "Unknown Caller", as well as in "Moment of Surrender", when the character is having a crisis of faith and is suicidal. In an altered state, the character attempts to use his phone to buy drugs, when he begins receiving cryptic text messages with technology-inspired directions. The themes in the song include social alienation and personal identity, as well as optimism. Mojo noted that the drug addict was "not unusual in this record in being lost, spiritually broken." The lyrics "3:33, when the numbers fell off the clock face" are a reference to Jeremiah 33:3, the same Bible verse referenced on the cover of U2's 2000 album, All That You Can't Leave Behind.

== Composition ==
"Unknown Caller" is composed in the key of G major. The song begins with a droning noise, the birdsong of Moroccan swallows, and exotic instruments, before The Edge begins playing a four note riff, similar to that of "Walk On". The chorus features a monotone group chant of commands ("Go / Shout it out / Rise up / Hear me, cease to speak / That I may speak / Shush now"), alternating with drawn out "Ohh / Ohh" lines. After the second chorus, a French horn part, played by Richard Watkins, as well as a church organ are heard. The song concludes with a guitar solo that was taken directly from the song's backing track.

== Live performances ==
"Unknown Caller" made its live debut on the opening night of the U2 360° Tour with Larry Mullen Jr and The Edge both providing backing vocals. It was played at 22 of 24 concerts during the first leg of the tour, where it typically followed one of "In a Little While", "Stuck in a Moment You Can't Get Out Of", and "Stay (Faraway, So Close!)", and preceded "The Unforgettable Fire". It was also performed at the beginning of the second leg of the tour, usually following "I Still Haven't Found What I'm Looking For" or "Your Blue Room", but was dropped from the set list for several weeks. It was played again towards the end of the second leg.

In the break between songs, the birdsong recorded in the introduction was played through the stage's speakers. The video screen showed footage of the band members with the song's lyrics positioned overtop scrolling from right to left. The words are colored red with the exception of the word that is currently being sung, which is highlighted in green.

== Reception and legacy ==
"Unknown Caller" received mixed reviews from critics. Rolling Stone described The Edge's guitar solo as "a straightforward, elegiac break with a worn, notched edge to his treble tone", while likening Bono's chorus chant of "Shout for joy if you get the chance" to the band's 1979 song "Out of Control", noting that "[Bono] is still singing about singing." Reviewer Brian Hiatt noted that the song would have worked well on All That You Can't Leave Behind. Q described the song's placement in the opening half of the album as "the U2 of wide-open spaces, of sweeping mountain valleys, and of Edge's signature chiming guitar lines." Mojo felt that bassist Adam Clayton's playing was largely responsible for the song's "evocation of both frigidity and tenderness", noting the transition from the French horn to The Edge's guitar solo was "as exalted as any U2 music gets." Blender felt that Bono "reache[d] Bowie-in-Berlin levels of arty alienation," and labelled the guitar playing in the song the best from the album, while the New York Times believed it would be a "likely arena singalong" live. Uncut likened the song to the band's 1984 single "Pride (In the Name of Love)", describing it as "the most dramatic bait-and-switch on a record riddled with them – a gentle Edge guitar figure and birdsong an unlikely foundation for the gradual erection of a terrifically unabashed stadium epic." Musician Gavin Friday described the song as "a new age 'Bad'", and Hot Press editor Niall Stokes called the song "another U2 classic". Dutch newspaper NRC likened the end of "Unknown Caller" to a JS Bach composition, stating: "The chorus unfolds as a militaristic polyphonic speech: 'Shout it out/ Rise up/ Escape yourself,/ and gravity', and then undergoes a baroque transformation - guitars become horns, harpsichords become organs - for which J.S. Bach should not have been ashamed."

Allmusic was not a fan of the song, stating "when U2, Eno, and Lanois push too hard – the ill-begotten techno-speak overload of "Unknown Caller"... – the ideas collapse like a pyramid of cards... turning it into a murky muddle." NME believed that the lyrics were No Line on the Horizon's greatest weakpoint, citing "Unknown Caller"'s chorus of "Force quit and move to trash" and "Restart and reboot yourself" as being inspired by Bono's computer. Pitchfork stated that the song was "a wash of shameless U2-isms," noting that some of the guitar parts were very similar to those of "Walk On".

"Unknown Caller" is the opening track in the Anton Corbijn film Linear, based on a story by Corbijn and Bono where a Parisian traffic cop travels across France and the Mediterranean Sea to visit his girlfriend in Tripoli. The opening sequence shows a scene of Paris at dusk, before moving on to a journey through the city streets. It ends at the traffic cop's home, where the next track, "Breathe", begins. "Unknown Caller" has been used in ESPN television commercials advertising the 2010 FIFA World Cup, along with several other U2 songs.

== Personnel ==
U2

- Bono – lead vocals
- The Edge – guitar, backing vocals, piano
- Adam Clayton – bass guitar
- Larry Mullen Jr. – drums

Additional musicians

- Terry Lawless – additional keyboards
- Richard Watkins – French horn

== See also ==
- List of covers of U2 songs – Unknown Caller
