= Cedars of Lebanon (song) =

Song by U2

from the album No Line on the Horizon
- Released: 27 February 2009
- Genre: Soft rock
- Length: 4:13
- Label: Island
- Composers: U2, Brian Eno, and Daniel Lanois
- Lyricist: Bono
- Producers: Lanois, Eno

"Cedars of Lebanon" is a song by Irish rock band U2, featured as the eleventh and final track on their 2009 album, No Line on the Horizon. The song is sung from the perspective of a war correspondent who is "squeezing complicated lives into a simple headline" and who "observes "this shitty world" where the aroma of a rose "lingers and then it just goes". Additionally, the song samples "Against the Sky," a collaboration between producer Brian Eno and Harold Budd, originally featured on the 1984 album The Pearl.

== Reception ==
In a review of the album, Jon Pareles of The New York Times characterized the song as "a somber meditation on war, separation, and enmity". Comparing the song with "Moment of Surrender" on the same album, NME reviewer Ben Patashnik described "Cedars of Lebanon" as "similarly downbeat but no-less-enthralling", and said that the song "is buoyed by Larry Mullen Jr's martial drumming and a twinkling guitar". The Sydney Morning Herald called the song a "masterful closer", and said that the "backing vocals, ambient noises and restraint seal a deal alongside the atmosphere of philosophical weariness."

== Personnel ==
U2

- Bono – lead vocals, guitar
- The Edge – guitar, backing vocals, piano
- Adam Clayton – bass guitar
- Larry Mullen Jr. – drums, percussion

Technical

- Production – Daniel Lanois
- Engineering – Tony Mangurian
- Additional engineering – Declan Gaffney, Richard Rainey
- Mixing – Lanois, Gaffney
