= No Line on the Horizon =

Studio album by U2
- Released: 27 February 2009
- Recorded: May 2007 – December 2008
- Studios: Riad El Yacout (Fez); Hanover Quay (Dublin); Platinum Sound (New York City); Olympic (London)
- Genre: Rock
- Length: 53:44
- Labels: Mercury; Island; Interscope
- Producers: Brian Eno; Daniel Lanois; Steve Lillywhite

U2 chronology
Medium, Rare & Remastered (2009)	No Line on the Horizon (2009)	Artificial Horizon (2010)

Singles from No Line on the Horizon
- 1. "Get On Your Boots" Released: 16 February 2009; 2. "Magnificent" Released: 4 May 2009; 3. "I'll Go Crazy If I Don't Go Crazy Tonight" Released: 7 September 2009

No Line on the Horizon is the twelfth studio album by Irish rock band U2. It was produced by Brian Eno, Daniel Lanois, and Steve Lillywhite, and was released on 27 February 2009. It was the band's first record since How to Dismantle an Atomic Bomb (2004), marking the longest gap between studio albums of their career to that point. The band originally intended to release the songs as two EPs, but later combined the material into a single record. Photographer Anton Corbijn shot a companion film, Linear, which was released alongside the album and included with several special editions.

U2 began work on a new album in 2006 with record producer Rick Rubin but shelved most of the material from those sessions. In May 2007, the group began new sessions with Eno and Lanois in Fez, Morocco, while attending the World Sacred Music Festival. Intending to write "future hymns"—songs that would be played forever—the group spent two weeks recording in a riad, with the producers involved in the songwriting process. The exotic musical influences that the group were exposed to in Fez inspired them to pursue a more experimental sound, but as the sessions unfolded, the band decided to scale back the extent of those pursuits. Having grown tired of writing in the first-person, lead singer Bono wrote his lyrics from the perspective of different characters. Recording continued at several studios in the United States, United Kingdom, and Ireland through December 2008. The group had intended to release No Line on the Horizon in November, but after composing 50 to 60 songs, they delayed the release to continue writing.

Prior to the album's release, U2 claimed that their time in Fez, as well as Eno's and Lanois's involvement, had resulted in a more experimental record than their previous two albums. The band compared the shift in style to that seen between their albums The Joshua Tree (1987) and Achtung Baby (1991). Upon release, No Line on the Horizon received generally favourable reviews, although many critics noted that it was not as experimental as previously suggested. The album debuted at number one in 30 countries but did not sell as well as anticipated; the band expressed disappointment over the relatively low sales of five million copies, compared to previous albums. Following the release of No Line on the Horizon, the band discussed plans to release a meditative follow-up album, Songs of Ascent, but the project has not come to fruition. The supporting U2 360° Tour from 2009 to 2011 broke the record for the highest-grossing concert tour in history, earning over $736 million.

== Recording and production ==
=== Aborted sessions with Rick Rubin ===
In 2006, U2 started work on the follow-up to How to Dismantle an Atomic Bomb (2004), collaborating with producer Rick Rubin. After U2 guitarist the Edge worked individually with Rubin in Los Angeles, the group spent two weeks in September 2006 completing songs with the producer at Abbey Road Studios in London. Later that year, the band released two songs from these sessions on the compilation album U218 Singles: a cover of the Skids' "The Saints Are Coming" with Green Day, and "Window in the Skies". In January 2007, lead singer Bono said U2 intended to take their next album in a different musical direction from their previous few releases. He said: "We're gonna continue to be a band, but maybe the rock will have to go; maybe the rock has to get a lot harder. But whatever it is, it's not gonna stay where it is."

Rubin encouraged a "back to basics" approach and wanted the group to bring finished songs to the studio. This approach conflicted with U2's freeform recording style, by which they improvised material in the studio. The Edge said: "we sort of hadn't really finished the songs. It's typical for us, because it's in the process of recording that we really do our writing." Bassist Adam Clayton said: "once we have a song, we're interested in the atmospherics and the tones and the overdubs and the different stuff you can do with it... things that Rick was not in the slightest bit interested in. He was interested in getting it from embryonic stage to a song that could be mixed and put on a record." They ultimately decided to shelve the material recorded with Rubin, but expressed interest in revisiting it in the future. Rubin said: "I don't know what their perspective was. I thought we had fun."

=== Sessions with Brian Eno, Daniel Lanois, and Steve Lillywhite ===
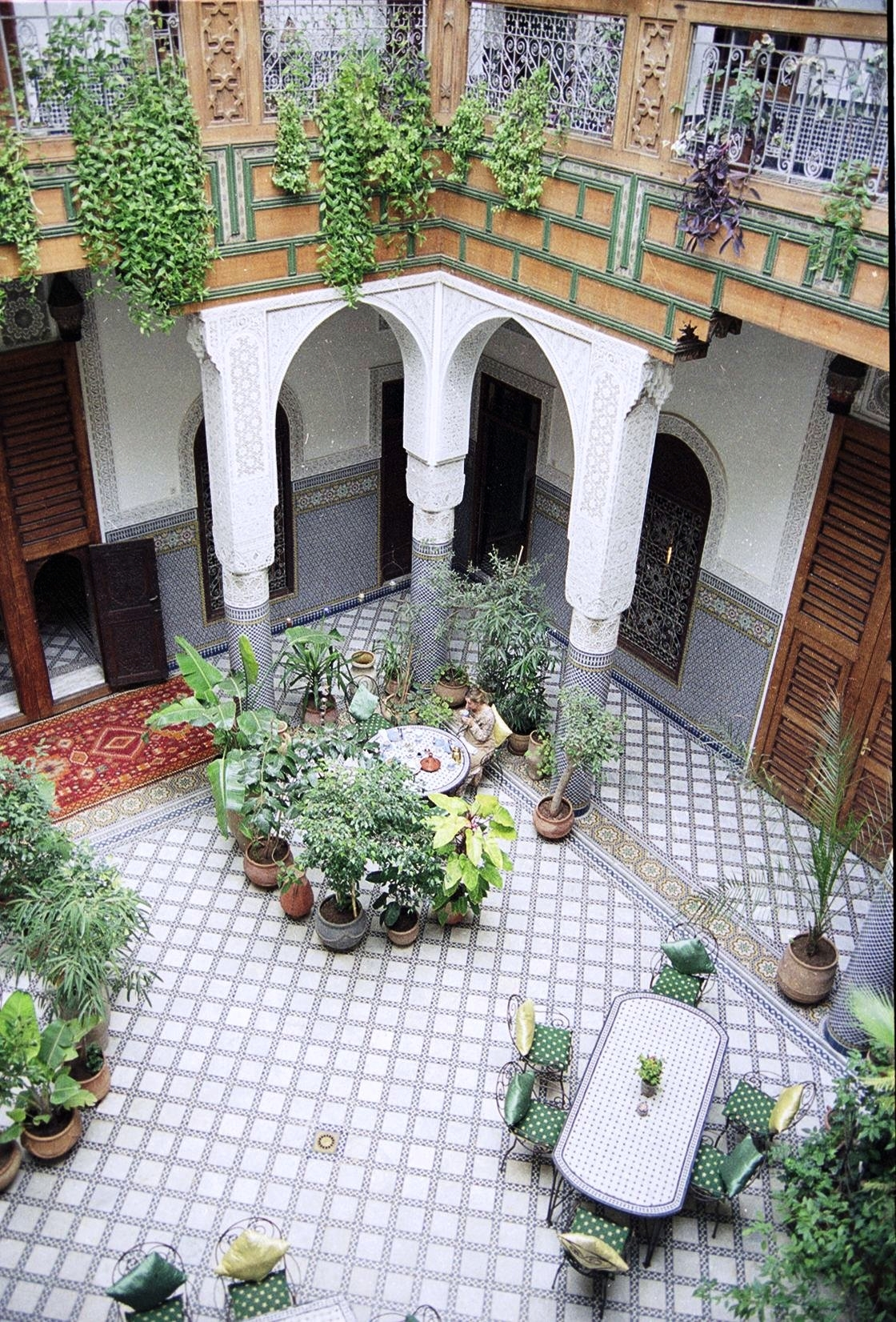
For two weeks from May–June 2007, U2, Eno, and Lanois wrote and recorded music in a Moroccan Riad similar to the one pictured.

U2 subsequently began working with Brian Eno and Daniel Lanois in May 2007. Bono, who had accepted an invitation to the World Sacred Music Festival in Fez, Morocco, invited his bandmates to attend. Bono also invited Eno and Lanois, hoping they would collaborate with the band as full songwriting partners in recording an album of "futuristic spirituals" or "future hymns"—songs that would be played forever. For two weeks, U2, Eno, and Lanois rented the riad of the hotel Riad El Yacout in Fez and turned it into a makeshift recording studio, occasionally recording with an oud player and local percussionists.

Recording during the festival exposed the group to Hindu and Jewish music, Sufi singing and Joujouka drums. The exotic influences inspired them to pursue a more experimental sound. Clayton said the music they heard in Fez "had a primitivism ... but there was an other-worldly feel, there was that connection with that Arabic scale." Eno insisted that drummer Larry Mullen Jr. use an electronic drum kit. The band described many of the tracks conceived in these sessions as unsuitable for radio airplay or for playing live. The open-air riad allowed the group to hear birdsong, as captured in the introduction to "Unknown Caller". The songs "Moment of Surrender", "White as Snow", "No Line on the Horizon" and "Unknown Caller" were written at this time; each track was recorded in one take. In total, the band recorded approximately 10 songs during the two weeks. The Edge said of their time with Eno and Lanois in Fez, "it became very clear almost immediately that this was gonna be a very fruitful experiment." He called it "a very freeing experience" that "reminded [him] in many ways of early on and why [they] got into a band in the first place. Just that joy of playing." When the topic of who would produce the record was broached, Lanois suggested, "[the album is] kind of producing itself, so let's just go with the people we have", cementing him and Eno in the roles.

"... none of that [experimental music] really appeared on the record ... because it sounded kind of synthetic. It sounded kind of like 'world music' add-on. I'm sure it would have got a few people saying, oh, how interesting, they've broken out into North African music, but actually it just didn't sound convincing. We were very impressed by the music while we were there, but there was no realistic or emotionally satisfying way of marrying it using the music that we were doing, so in the end not very much of it at all showed through."

— Brian Eno

After leaving Fez, the band recorded in Hanover Quay Studios in Dublin, Platinum Sound Recording Studios in New York City, and Olympic Studios in London. Steve Lillywhite was brought in to produce a few tracks during these subsequent sessions. In pre-release interviews, U2 compared the extent of their expected shift in musical style to that of Achtung Baby. The band scaled back these experimental pursuits, however; Mullen noted: "at a certain stage, reality hits, and you go, 'What are we gonna do with this stuff?' Are we going to release this sort of meandering experimentation, or are we gonna knock some songs out of this?" Bono shared this opinion, stating, "We went so far out on the Sufi singing and the sort of ecstatic-music front, that we had to ground it and find a counterpoint." Eno commented that many of "the more contemplative and sonically adventurous songs" had been dropped, attributing the lack of African-inspired music to its sounding "synthetic" and unconvincing when paired with other songs.

Clayton filmed the band's progress during the album's production; these videos were added to the subscribers' section of U2.com. On 16 August 2008, an eavesdropping fan recorded several songs playing from Bono's beach house in Èze, France. These "beach clips" were uploaded to YouTube, but removed at Universal Music's request. In November 2008, the Edge confirmed the album's working title as No Line on the Horizon and noted that the band had to move quickly to complete mixing to meet the new February release date. In an interview with Q, the group revealed that rapper will.i.am had worked with them on the track "I'll Go Crazy If I Don't Go Crazy Tonight".

In December 2008, U2 recorded at Olympic Studios in London, putting the finishing touches to the album and making several changes to its content. The group had planned to release the material as two extended plays, titled Daylight and Darkness, but during these sessions decided to compile the best songs onto one album. The band struggled to complete "Stand Up Comedy", a song they had been working on since the Fez sessions 16 months previously. The song had been through multiple iterations and titles, including "For Your Love" and "Stand Up". U2 dropped "Winter", a song Eno had urged them to complete, as well as "Every Breaking Wave", which they removed to reduce the album's running time. "Winter" appears in the accompanying Anton Corbijn film Linear and the 2009 war film Brothers. Both songs had been mentioned in pre-release album reviews.

The band changed many of the tracks' names during recording, retitling "French Disco" to "Magnificent" and "Crazy Tonight" to "I'll Go Crazy If I Don't Go Crazy Tonight". "Chromium Chords" became "Tripoli", and finally "Fez – Being Born". The band considered "Fez – Being Born" and "Get On Your Boots" as album openers, but ultimately decided on "No Line on the Horizon". At the end of the sessions, the band chose to include "White as Snow", a quiet song about a dying soldier in Afghanistan, to balance out the earlier, rockier tunes. With the exception of this track, U2 had tried to keep the theme of war out of the album. In early December 2008, Clayton stated, "this is definitely the last week of recording. But then again, last week was definitely the last week of recording, and the week before that." The final sessions ended later that month. No Line on the Horizon is dedicated to Rob Partridge, who signed the band's first record deal in 1980 and died of cancer in late 2008.

=== Follow-up album ===
In February 2009, Bono stated that by the end of the year, U2 would release an album consisting of unused material from the No Line on the Horizon sessions. Bono labelled it "a more meditative album on the theme of pilgrimage". Provisionally titled Songs of Ascent, it would be a sister release to No Line on the Horizon, similar to Zooropa's relationship to Achtung Baby. In June 2009, Bono said that although nine tracks had been completed, the album would only be released if its quality surpassed that of No Line on the Horizon. A December 2009 report stated that U2 had been working in the studio with the goal of a mid-2010 release. The band revealed that the first single was intended to be "Every Breaking Wave".

Over time, the album continued to be delayed. In April 2010, U2's manager Paul McGuinness confirmed that the album would not be finished by June, but indicated that a release "before the end of the year [was] increasingly likely." In October 2010, Bono stated that their new album would be produced by Danger Mouse, and that 12 songs had been completed. He also noted that U2 were working on a potential album of club music in the spirit of "U2's remixes in the 1990s". Around the same time, McGuinness said the album was slated for an early 2011 release. In February 2011, he said that the album was almost complete and had a tentative release date of May 2011, although he noted that Songs of Ascent was no longer the likely title. The Songs of Ascent project ultimately did not come to fruition and has not been released; its evolution and apparent abandonment are examined in the book The Greatest Albums You'll Never Hear. Clayton said, "We thought there was more material left over from No Line... we now feel a long way from that material."

After numerous delays, U2 digitally released their thirteenth album, Songs of Innocence, on 9 September 2014 in a surprise release. The band appeared the same day at an Apple Inc. product launch event to announce the album and reveal it was being released to all iTunes Store customers at no cost.

In October 2014, Bono said that Songs of Ascent "will come" and that the group views it as the third release in a possible trilogy of albums.

== Composition ==
"... it's a very personal album. These are very personal stories even though they are written in character and, in a way, they couldn't be further from my own politics. But, in the sense of the peripheral vision, there's a world out there. As the old blues song goes, a world gone wrong. You can feel it just at the edges—the war in Iraq, the dark clouds on the horizon. But there is also a deliberate shutting out of that in order to focus on more personal epiphanies."

— Bono

During the Hanover Quay sessions in 2008, Bono indicated that he had become "tired of [writing in] the first-person", leading him to write songs from the perspective of different characters. He invented "a traffic cop, a junkie [and] a soldier serving in Afghanistan." Although each character tells a personal story, the underlying theme of the album is peripheral vision, events taking place in the wider world, "just at the edges". Bono described it as "central to the understanding of this album". Nevertheless, as the characters narrate there is an intentional "shutting out" of the wider world, so that the focus remains on their "personal epiphanies". The narrative the group originally planned for the album was broken up in the sessions' final weeks with their changes to the track listing. Bono revealed that numbers were significant in many of the songs, and that the album was split into thirds; he described the first section as "a whole world unto itself, and you get to a very ecstatic place", and the second as "a load of singles". The final third is composed of songs that are "unusual territory" for the band.

"No Line on the Horizon" stemmed from Mullen's experiments with different drum beats; Eno sampled and manipulated the patterns, and the rest of the band began to play over the beats. The lyrical idea of a place "where the sea meets the sky and you can't tell the difference between the two" and the vocal delivery were both present from the start. Bono noted that the theme behind the song was infinity, and that the track was inherently optimistic. "Magnificent" is an up-tempo song that begins with a synthesiser line by Eno. The band wanted a track that felt euphoric, and the melody, created from a series of chord changes during a jam, was worked on continuously by Bono. The setting in the lyrics was described by Lanois as "New York in the 50s", written from the perspective of "a Charlie Parker kind of figure". The song has been described as "echo[ing] The Unforgettable Fire's opening track 'A Sort of Homecoming' in its atmospheric sweep".

"Moment of Surrender"
"Moment of Surrender", recorded in a single take, is the track that producers Brian Eno and Daniel Lanois said best represents the band's original album concept of creating "future hymns".

The drug addict character appears in the songs "Moment of Surrender" and "Unknown Caller". "Moment of Surrender", improvised and recorded by U2, Eno, and Lanois in a single take, demonstrates gospel influences. Eno and Lanois said the song is the closest to the group's original concept for an album of future hymns. Eno noted, "Apart from some editing and the addition of the short cello piece that introduces it, the song appears on the album exactly as it was the first and only time we played it." In the song, the addict is having a crisis of faith. In "Unknown Caller", the character is suicidal and, while using his phone to buy drugs, begins receiving cryptic text messages with technology-inspired directions. The track was developed early in the Fez sessions. The guitar solo at the song's conclusion was taken from the backing track.

Eno developed "I'll Go Crazy If I Don't Go Crazy Tonight" during the Fez sessions, under the working title "Diorama". U2 reworked it with Steve Lillywhite during a break from recording with Eno and Lanois. Some of the lyrics were influenced by Barack Obama's presidential campaign, while others referenced Bono. Album reviews described the song as a joyous pop rock composition. "Get On Your Boots" stemmed from a guitar riff The Edge created and recorded at his home. At 150 beats per minute, the song is one of the fastest the band have recorded. Rolling Stone called it a "blazing, fuzzed-out rocker that picks up where 'Vertigo' left off." Thematically, the song is about Bono taking his family on vacation to France and witnessing warplanes flying overhead at the start of the Iraq War. The chant "let me in the sound" was developed late in the recording sessions and became a motif throughout parts of the album.

"Stand Up Comedy" went through numerous iterations; at one point, Lanois noted, "that song was about six different songs". In its original concept, the track featured mandolins playing in a Middle Eastern beat. The riff was altered and a chorus of "for your love" was introduced. This version was discarded as the band came up with a new riff and lyrics, only retaining the "for your love" vocal. U2 liked the result at the end of the sessions, but felt that the song would appear too "crafted"; they instead chose an older mix for inclusion on the album. Several of the song's lyrics, including the line, "Be careful of small men with big ideas", relate to Bono's self-mockery. The guitar sound from the experimental "Fez" portion of "Fez – Being Born" was developed while the band recorded "The Saints Are Coming" during the Rick Rubin sessions. Lanois edited the part, adding a beat developed by Eno, before playing it for the group. The sounds of a Moroccan marketplace were also added. The faster section of the song, "Being Born", was altered into the same key as "Fez" and Lanois placed the two sections together, creating the one song. The "let me in the sound" chant from "Get On Your Boots" is included at the beginning of the track, which has been described as an introductory sound collage.

"White as Snow"
Based on the hymn "Veni, veni, Emmanuel", "White as Snow" describes the last thoughts of a dying soldier in Afghanistan.

"White as Snow" focuses on the soldier character's last thoughts as he dies from the wounds suffered from an improvised explosive device. The song is based on the traditional hymn "Veni, veni, Emmanuel"; the idea to base the song on a public domain melody was suggested to Lanois by Newfoundland musician Lori Anna Reid. "Breathe" is set on 16 June, an intentional reference to James Joyce's novel Ulysses. U2 worked on an earlier version of the song for a long time before they scrapped it and re-recorded it with Lillywhite. Two sets of lyrics were also present; one about Nelson Mandela, and the other "more surreal and personal". The band decided to use the latter. "Cedars of Lebanon", written from the perspective of a journalist covering a war overseas, was created in a similar manner to "Fez – Being Born". The song's melody was based on a sample of "Against the Sky", a track Eno and Lanois had collaborated on with Harold Budd for the 1984 album The Pearl; the group noted that the ambience of the song was "like a direct throwback to the early 80s". The final verse is a condemnation of the Iraq War.

== Release ==
At the music industry trade fair Midem in 2008, Paul McGuinness said No Line on the Horizon would be ready for release in October 2008. Lanois corroborated that in June 2008, stating the album should be ready in 3–4 weeks. He said, "We're just finishing the vocals. Bono's in great form, singing fantastic." On 3 September 2008, U2.com posted an article in which Bono revealed that the new album would be out "in early 2009", also noting that "around 50–60 songs" had been recorded in the sessions. It was later confirmed the album would be released on 27 February 2009 in Ireland, 2 March in the UK, and 3 March in North America. The gap between How to Dismantle an Atomic Bomb and No Line on the Horizon's release was the longest of the band's career to that point.

Universal Music Group took extreme measures to prevent the album from leaking, offering pre-release listening sessions for critics instead of sending out review copies. However, Universal Music Australia's online music store, getmusic.com.au, accidentally released the album for digital sale on 18 February 2009, almost two weeks before the scheduled release date. The complete album appeared on the website for a short time before it was removed, and the accidental sale led to the album's being leaked and shared across the Internet. U2 reacted to the leak with some positivity. The Edge stated, "The one good thing about that is a lot of our fans have already given us their thumbs up. Even though it was fans getting it for free."

=== Artwork ===
The cover art for No Line on the Horizon is a photograph of Lake Constance, taken by Japanese photographer Hiroshi Sugimoto; titled Boden Sea, it is one of 200 pictures in his Seascapes collection. The image was the inspiration for Bono's lyrics on the track "No Line on the Horizon". Sugimoto and U2 struck a deal in which the band could use the photograph as the cover art and Sugimoto could use "No Line on the Horizon" in his future projects; Sugimoto's only stipulation was that no text could be placed on top of the image. Original releases had an equals sign superimposed in the middle of the album cover, but later releases featured only the image. AMP Visual, who designed the equals sign, stated that it represents "a form of title for the album, from the universal language of mathematics," taking inspiration from the album's theme of "universal balance and contrast, of night and day." Continuing the mathematical theme that the equals sign established, the packaging of the digipak special edition features a "little hidden code" in the form of a piece of the Fibonacci sequence.

Boden Sea had previously been used by Richard Chartier and Taylor Deupree for their 2006 album Specification.Fifteen. The album covers are similar, though No Line on the Horizon has a white border around the image, and Specification.Fifteen has a box at the top of the cover with the names of the artists and the album. Deupree called U2's cover "nearly an exact rip-off" and stated that for the band to obtain the rights to the image it was "simply a phone call and a check." Sugimoto refuted both of these claims, calling the use of the same photograph a coincidence and stating that no money was involved in the deal with U2.

=== Formats ===
No Line on the Horizon was released in five physical formats, three of which—the digipak, magazine, and box formats—were limited editions. The standard jewel case release contained a 24-page booklet. The vinyl release was pressed on two black discs and contained a 16-page booklet. The digipak release had a 36-page booklet and a poster, which was also included in the box release. A 60-page magazine was included in the magazine release. Linear was a downloadable feature in the digipak and magazine formats, and was a bonus DVD in the box release, which also contained a 64-page hardcover book.

The album was made available for pre-order on the iTunes Store on 19 January 2009, the day "Get On Your Boots" premiered on radio. iTunes album pre-orders contained bonus tracks unavailable with any other version. Digital versions were available from Amazon.com in MP3 format, and from U2.com in MP3 and FLAC formats.

Continuing a campaign by U2 to reissue all of their records on vinyl, No Line on the Horizon was reissued on 22 February 2019 on two 180-gram vinyl discs to commemorate its 10th anniversary. Two reissued editions—black vinyl and a limited-edition "ultra-clear" vinyl—include the album on three sides, with remixes of "Magnificent" and "I'll Go Crazy If I Don't Go Crazy Tonight" on side four.

=== Linear ===
Linear, a film directed by Anton Corbijn, is included with the digipak, magazine, box, and deluxe iTunes editions of the album. The idea for the film originated from a U2 video shoot in June 2007, during which Corbijn asked the band to remain still while he filmed them to create a "photograph on film"; the band did not move but the objects around them did. Impressed, the band believed that the online album listening experience could be enhanced with moving imagery. In May 2008, they commissioned Corbijn to create the film. Corbijn has claimed that Linear is not a music video but "a new way to listen to a record" and "a new way to use film to connect to music".

The film is based on a story by Corbijn and Bono, and includes several of the characters Bono created for the album. The plot focuses on a Parisian motorcycle officer, played by Saïd Taghmaoui; the character has become disillusioned with his life and the conflict between immigrants and the police in the city, causing him to leave to see his girlfriend in Tripoli. The song order in the film is representative of No Line on the Horizon's as it was in May 2008.

== Promotion and singles ==
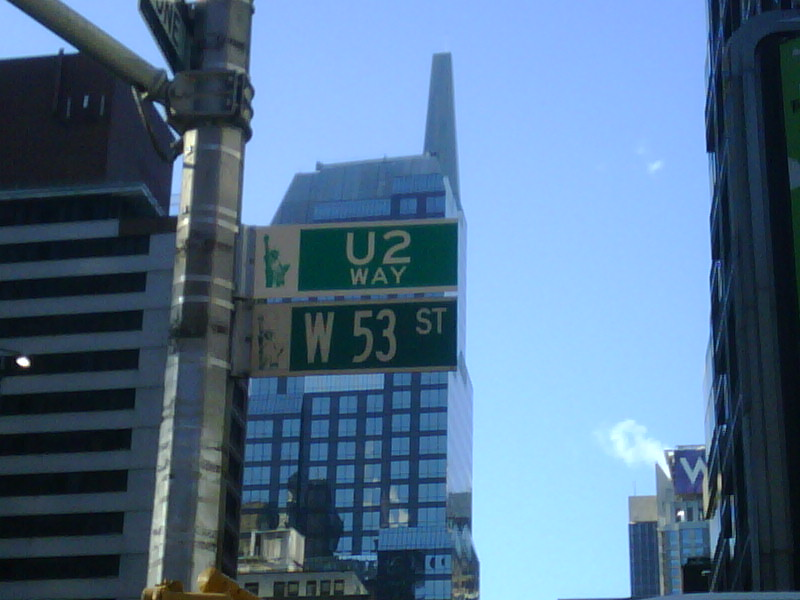
A street sign reading "U2 Way" was added to 53rd Street in Manhattan during the album's promotion.

To promote No Line on the Horizon, U2 performed "Get On Your Boots" at the 51st Grammy Awards, the 2009 BRIT Awards, and the 2009 Echo Awards, although the album was not eligible for awards at any of the ceremonies. The band later appeared on French television and radio on 23 February 2009, and on 26 February they taped a segment for Friday Night with Jonathan Ross, which was aired the next day. On 27 February, U2 made an appearance on a Live Lounge session for BBC Radio 1, followed by a mini-concert on the roof of Broadcasting House. On the week of 2 March 2009, U2 appeared on CBS-TV's Late Show with David Letterman for five consecutive nights, the first time a musical guest had performed for an entire week on the show. The group performed "Breathe", "Magnificent", "I'll Go Crazy If I Don't Go Crazy Tonight", "Beautiful Day", and "Get On Your Boots". On 3 March, Michael Bloomberg, Mayor of New York City, added a street sign reading "U2 Way" at 53rd Street in Manhattan, for the week that U2 performed on the Late Show. U2 also performed at Fordham University on 6 March 2009 for an appearance on ABC-TV's Good Morning America. From 9 to 11 March, the band participated in "U2 3 Nights Live", a series of radio interviews and performances that were broadcast across North America and streamed live on U2.com.

From 11 to 17 February 2009, U2.com hosted a promotion where 4,000 fans could win a 7-inch single collector's edition box set that contained all four of the singles released from No Line on the Horizon. An alternate version of the title track, "No Line on the Horizon 2", debuted on RTÉ 2XM on 12 February 2009; it was later used as the B-side for the first single, "Get On Your Boots". The full album began streaming on the group's MySpace page on 20 February 2009, and on U2.com a few days later.

Four singles were planned from the album, although only three were released. The first single, "Get On Your Boots", was released as a digital download on 19 January 2009, and in a physical format on 16 February 2009. The iTunes store held the exclusive digital download rights to the single for the first 24 hours. The second single, "Magnificent", was released on 4 May 2009. The third single, "I'll Go Crazy If I Don't Go Crazy Tonight", was released on 7 September 2009.

== Critical reception ==
Professional ratings
Aggregate scores
Source	Rating
Metacritic	72/100
Review scores
Source	Rating
AllMusic	3.5/5 stars
Blender	5/5 stars
Mojo	4/5 stars
NME	7/10
Pitchfork	4.2/10
Q	5/5 stars
Rolling Stone	5/5 stars
RTÉ	3/5 stars
Time Out Sydney	2/5 stars
Toronto Star	2/4 stars

No Line on the Horizon received generally favourable reviews. At Metacritic, which assigns a weighted average rating out of 100 to reviews from mainstream critics, the album received an average score of 72, based on 30 reviews. David Fricke of Rolling Stone gave it a five-star score and called it "[U2's] best, in its textural exploration and tenacious melodic grip, since 1991's Achtung Baby." In his review for Blender, Rob Sheffield stated "The days are gone when U2 were trying to keep it simple—at this point, the lads have realized that over-the-top romantic grandiosity is the style that suits them, so they come on like the cosmic guitar supplicants they were born to be." Uncut magazine's Andrew Mueller commented, "It's U2's least immediate album—but there's something about it that suggests it may be one of their most enduring." Jeff Jensen of Entertainment Weekly graded it an "A−" and called the album "an eclectic and electrifying winner, one that speaks to the zeitgeist the way only U2 can and dare to do." BBC Music reviewer Chris Jones said, "There's plenty to rejoice about here" while noting that the "symbiotic relationship with Brian Eno (and Daniel Lanois) seems to have reached the point of imperceptibility." NME contributor Ben Patashnik called the album "a grand, sweeping, brave record that, while not quite the reinvention they pegged it as, suggests they've got the chops to retain their relevance well into their fourth decade as a band."

In a less enthusiastic review, Time Out Sydney felt that the album is unfortunately Brian Eno's new album rather than U2's: "for all that's new, there's no way that you'll mistake it for another band." Pitchfork reviewer Ryan Dombal gave a score of 4.2 out of 10, stating, "the album's ballyhooed experimentation is either terribly misguided or hidden underneath a wash of shameless U2-isms." Cameron Adams of the Herald Sun gave a rating of three and a half stars, comparing it to the 1990s albums Zooropa, Pop, and Original Soundtracks 1 while stating "This is no blockbuster ... It's the least immediate U2 album in years, but one that diehard fans will enjoy living with". Madeleine Chong of MTV Asia wrote that, "Although U2 should be lauded for their efforts at constant reinvention and pushing the envelope in the rock genre, [No Line on the Horizon] possesses neither the iconic qualities of The Joshua Tree or the radical yet relevant magnetism of Achtung Baby." Toronto Star music critic Ben Rayner called the songs boring, adding that the ambience introduced by Eno and Lanois was "often all these vague, hook-deficient songs have going for them." Rob Harvilla of The Village Voice gave the album a mixed review and wrote that its songs "will remind you of other, much better songs, but in a way that only makes you want to go and listen to those other songs instead." Josh Tyrangiel of Time magazine also gave it an unfavourable review, calling the effort "unsatisfied" and "mostly restless, tentative and confused."

=== Accolades ===
No Line on the Horizon was nominated in the Best Rock Album category at the 52nd Grammy Awards in 2010. The song "I'll Go Crazy If I Don't Go Crazy Tonight" was nominated for Best Rock Performance by a Duo or Group With Vocals and Best Rock Song. The cut song "Winter" was nominated for Best Original Song at the 67th Golden Globe Awards for its role in the film Brothers. Rolling Stone ranked No Line on the Horizon the best album of the year and the 36th-best album of the decade, and "Moment of Surrender" as the best song of the year and the 36th-best song of the decade. The Irish Independent placed it fourth on their list of the year's top Irish albums, while Time listed the song "No Line on the Horizon" as the third-best of 2009.

== Commercial performance ==
No Line on the Horizon opened with strong sales, debuting at number one in thirty countries, including Australia, Belgium, Canada, France, Ireland, Japan, the Netherlands, Portugal, the United Kingdom, and the United States. Within one week of release, the album was certified platinum in Brazil, a record for the country. In the United States, it was U2's seventh number-one album; first-week sales exceeded 484,000, the band's second-highest figures after How to Dismantle an Atomic Bomb. In the United Kingdom, the album sold 157,928 copies in its first week to become U2's tenth number-one album, making them the fifth-most-successful act on the UK Albums Chart. By June 2009, over five million copies had been sold worldwide. Globally it was the seventh-highest-selling album of 2009.

Sales of the album stalled midway through 2009. By October, just over one million copies had been sold in the US, the group's lowest in more than a decade. Through March 2014, the album's lifetime sales in the country totaled 1.1 million copies. In the UK, the record sold less than a third of How to Dismantle an Atomic Bomb's figures, and a quarter of All That You Can't Leave Behind's. Global sales of No Line on the Horizon remained at five million copies through September 2010. The album did not generate a hit single; ABC noted that sales of How to Dismantle an Atomic Bomb had been propelled by the track "Vertigo, which had become well known to the public from its use in iPod commercials.

== U2 360° Tour ==
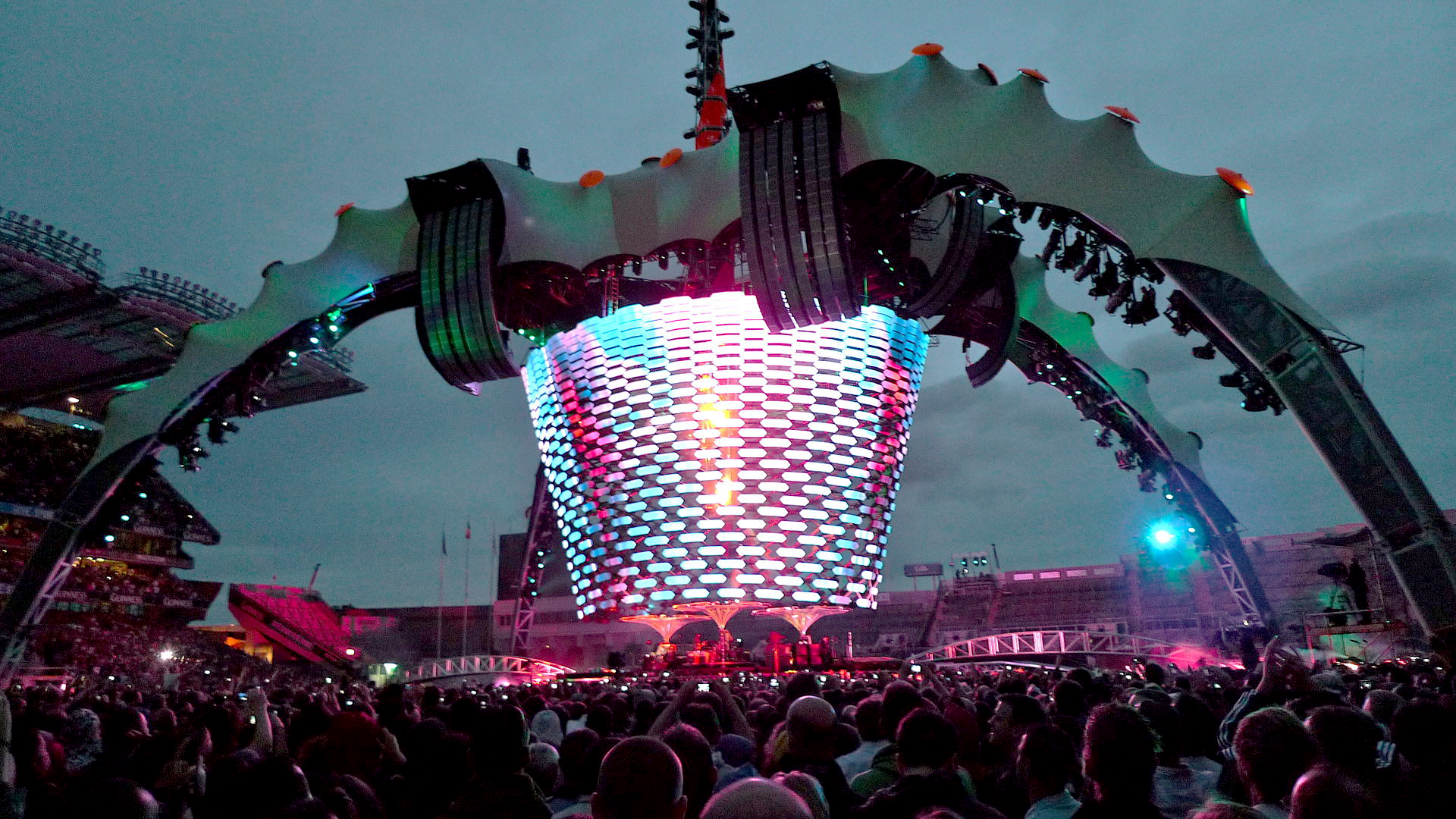
The U2 360° Tour featured the largest concert stage ever constructed.

Following the release of No Line on the Horizon, U2 staged a worldwide stadium tour, titled the U2 360° Tour. Beginning on 30 June 2009 in Barcelona, the tour visited Europe, North America, Oceania, Africa and South America from 2009 to 2011 and comprised 110 shows. The concerts featured a 360-degree stage that the audience surrounded. To accommodate this, a large four-legged structure nicknamed "The Claw" was built above the stage. At 50 meters (165 feet) tall, it was the largest stage ever constructed and twice the size of the previous largest set, which was used on The Rolling Stones' A Bigger Bang Tour. The idea for the stage had been proposed to the group by the set designer Willie Williams at the end of the Vertigo Tour in 2006. The design was intended to overcome the staid traditional appearance of outdoor concerts where the stage was dominated by speaker stacks on either side. Despite grossing over US$311 million from 44 shows over its first two legs, the tour was barely breaking even, with production costs of approximately US$750,000 per day. In 2010, U2's scheduled headline appearance at the Glastonbury Festival 2010 and their North American leg were postponed until the following year after Bono suffered a serious back injury. By its conclusion in July 2011, U2 360° had set records for the highest-grossing concert tour with $736 million in ticket sales, and for the highest-attended tour with 7.3 million tickets sold.

During the first leg of the tour in Europe, the band typically played songs from No Line on the Horizon early in the set. "Breathe", "No Line on the Horizon", "Get On Your Boots" and "Magnificent" were played as the opening quartet, while "Unknown Caller" and a remixed arrangement of "I'll Go Crazy If I Don't Go Crazy Tonight" appeared close to the halfway point. "Moment of Surrender" closed every show. U2 made minor changes to the setlists for the second leg of the tour. "No Line on the Horizon" was performed later in the concerts, while "Unknown Caller" was dropped for several weeks before being revived towards the end of the leg. The band did not play "Stand Up Comedy", "Fez – Being Born", "White as Snow", or "Cedars of Lebanon" at any point in 2009. The 25 October 2009 concert at the Rose Bowl in Pasadena, California, U2's penultimate concert of 2009, was filmed and streamed live over YouTube. The shoot used 27 high definition cameras; the concert was released on DVD and Blu-ray as U2 360° at the Rose Bowl on 3 June 2010.

== Legacy ==
Eight months after No Line on the Horizon's release, Bono said he was disappointed with the album's sales. Regarding the lack of commercial appeal, Bono said, "We weren't really in that mindset. We felt that the 'album' is almost an extinct species, and we [tried to] create a mood and feeling, and a beginning, middle and an end. And I suppose we've made a work that is a bit challenging for people who have grown up on a diet of pop stars." Clayton agreed that the album's commercial reception must be "challenged" but said, "the more interesting challenge is, 'What is rock 'n' roll in this changing world?' Because, to some extent, the concept of the music fan—the concept of the person who buys music and listens to music for the pleasure of music itself—is an outdated idea." The Edge predicted that, despite its lack of a big hit, No Line on the Horizon would grow on listeners over time. He noted that the reaction to the songs in the live setting made U2 believe that the material was connecting with the fans, adding, "There's a lot of records that make great first impressions. There might be one song that gets to be big on the radio, but they're not albums that people ... play a lot. This is one that I gather from talking to people. ... Four months later, they're saying, 'I'm really getting into the album now.'" McGuinness believed that the conditions of the music market were more responsible for the low sales than any decline in U2's popularity.

Lillywhite believed that the African influences had not translated well onto the album, remarking: "It's a pity because the whole idea of Morocco as a big idea was great. When the big idea for U2 is good, that is when they succeed the most, but I don't think the spirit of what they set out to achieve was translated. Something happened that meant it did not come across on the record." The Edge concurred, admitting that the group erred by "starting out experimental and then trying to bring it into something that was more accessible". He added, "I think probably we should have said, 'It's an experimental work. That's what it is.'" Mullen refers to the album as "No Craic on the Horizon" and said, "It was pretty fucking miserable. It turns out that we're not as good as we thought we were and things got in the way." He attributed the release of "Get On Your Boots" as the album's lead single as "the beginning of the end," as the album did not recover from the song's negative reception. While he considered "Moment of Surrender" to be perhaps U2's best song of the 2000s, Bono said he believes No Line on the Horizon was flawed because "the progressive-rock virus had crept in", adding: "The discipline of our songwriting, the thing that made U2 — top-line melody, clear thoughts — had gone. With the band, I was like, this is not what we do, and we can only do that experimental stuff if we have the songwriting chops." The band played fewer songs from No Line on the Horizon as the 360° Tour progressed, which Mullen called "a little bit of a defeat."

== Track listing ==
All lyrics are written by Bono, except where noted; all music is composed by U2, Brian Eno, Daniel Lanois, except where noted.

No.	Title	Lyrics	Music	Producer	Length
1.	"No Line on the Horizon"			Eno, Lanois; Steve Lillywhite (add.)	4:12
2.	"Magnificent"	Bono, The Edge		Eno, Lanois; Lillywhite (add.)	5:24
3.	"Moment of Surrender"			Eno, Lanois	7:24
4.	"Unknown Caller"	U2, Eno, Lanois		Eno, Lanois; Lillywhite (add.)	6:03
5.	"I'll Go Crazy If I Don't Go Crazy Tonight"		U2	Lillywhite; will.i.am (add.)	4:14
6.	"Get On Your Boots"		U2	Eno, Lanois; Declan Gaffney (add.)	3:25
7.	"Stand Up Comedy"		U2	Eno, Lanois; Lillywhite (add.)	3:50
8.	"Fez – Being Born"			Eno, Lanois	5:17
9.	"White as Snow"	U2, with Eno, Lanois	Traditional, arr. U2, with Eno, Lanois	Eno, Lanois	4:41
10.	"Breathe"		U2	Lillywhite; Lanois (add.), Eno (add.)	5:00
11.	"Cedars of Lebanon"			Lanois	4:13
Total length:					53:44

• (add.) Additional production

Australian, Japanese and iTunes Store bonus track
No.	Title	Producer	Length
12.	"No Line on the Horizon 2"	U2	4:07

iTunes Store pre-order bonus track
No.	Title	Music	Producer	Length
13.	"Get On Your Boots" (Crookers remix)	U2	Eno, Lanois, Gaffney	4:27

Notes

- "Cedars of Lebanon" features a sample of "Against the Sky" by Harold Budd and Brian Eno from the album The Pearl (1984).

== Personnel ==
Adapted from the liner notes.

U2

- Bono – vocals, guitar, additional keyboards (2)
- The Edge – guitar, vocals, piano
- Adam Clayton – bass guitar
- Larry Mullen Jr. – drums, percussion

Additional performers

- Brian Eno – rhythm loops, programming, synthesizers, vocals
- Daniel Lanois – guitar, vocals
- Terry Lawless – additional piano, Fender Rhodes, keyboards
- Caroline Dale – cello (3, 5, 10)
- Tony Mangurian – programming (8)
- Sam O'Sullivan – additional percussion (6)
- Cathy Thompson – violin (5)
- Louis Watkins – boy soprano (8)
- Richard Watkins – French horn (4, 9)
- will.i.am – additional keyboards (2, 5)

Technical

- Brian Eno – production (1–4, 6–9), additional production (10), mixing (8)
- Daniel Lanois – production (1–4, 6–9, 11), additional production (10), mixing (3, 4, 11)
- Steve Lillywhite – production (5, 10), additional production (1, 2, 4, 7), mixing (5, 7, 10)
- will.i.am – additional production (5)
- Richard Rainey – engineering (1–4, 6–9), additional engineering (11), mixing (8)
- Declan Gaffney – additional production (6), engineering (8–10), additional engineering (2–6, 11), mixing (3, 4, 6, 8, 9, 11)
- CJ Eiriksson – engineering (5, 7), additional engineering (10), mixing (5, 7, 10)
- Carl Glanville – engineering, additional engineering (1–4, 6), mixing
- Tony Mangurian – engineering (8, 11)
- Dave Emery – engineering (8), additional engineering (2), mixing (8), mix assistance (3–5, 7, 10)
- Florian Ammon – additional engineering (8)
- Cenzo Townshend – additional engineering (1), mixing (1, 2)
- Chris Heaney – engineering assistance (1–4, 8, 9, 11)
- Tom Hough – engineering assistance (5, 7, 10), mix assistance (3, 4, 7–9)
- Kevin "Kevo" Wilson – additional engineering assistance (8)
- Dave Clauss – engineering assistance (8), mix assistance (3, 4, 7, 11)
- Neil Comber – mix assistance (1, 2)
- John Davis – mastering
- Cheryl Engels – audio post production, coordination, and quality control

== Charts ==
Album charts (weekly)
Chart (2009)	Peak position
Argentine Albums (CAPIF)	1
Australian Albums (ARIA)	1
Austrian Albums (Ö3 Austria)	1
Belgian Albums (Ultratop Flanders)	1
Belgian Albums (Ultratop Wallonia)	1
Canadian Albums (Billboard)	1
Croatian Albums (HDU)	1
Czech Albums (ČNS IFPI)	1
Danish Albums (Hitlisten)	1
Dutch Albums (Album Top 100)	1
European Albums (Billboard)	1
Finnish Albums (Suomen virallinen lista)	1
French Albums (SNEP)	1
German Albums (Offizielle Top 100)	1
Greek Albums (IFPI)	1
Hungarian Albums (MAHASZ)	1
Icelandic Albums (Tónlistinn)	1
Irish Albums (IRMA)	1
Italian Albums (FIMI)	1
Japan Hot Albums (Billboard Japan)	5
Japanese Albums (Oricon)	4
Mexican Albums (Top 100 Mexico)	1
New Zealand Albums (RMNZ)	1
Norwegian Albums (VG-lista)	1
Polish Albums (ZPAV)	1
Portuguese Albums (AFP)	1
Scottish Albums (Official Charts)	1
South African Albums (RISA)	7
Spanish Albums (Promusicae)	1
Swedish Albums (Sverigetopplistan)	2
Swiss Albums (Schweizer Hitparade)	1
UK Albums (Official Charts)	1
US Billboard 200	1
US Top Alternative Albums (Billboard)	1
US Top Rock Albums (Billboard)	1
US Indie Store Album Sales (Billboard)	1

Album charts (end of year)
Chart (2009)	Position
Australian Albums (ARIA)	33
Austrian Albums (Ö3 Austria)	15
Belgian Albums (Utratop Flanders)	5
Belgian Alternative Albums (Ultratop Flanders)	3
Belgian Albums (Ultratop Wallonia)	5
Canadian Albums (Billboard)	18
Danish Albums (Hitlisten)	9
Dutch Albums (Album Top 100)	4
European Albums (Billboard)	5
Finnish Albums (Suomen virallinen lista)	6
French Albums (SNEP)	7
German Albums (Offizielle Top 100)	12
Hungarian Albums (MAHASZ)	11
Irish Albums (IRMA)	7
Italian Albums (FIMI)	5
Japanese Albums (Oricon)	92
Mexican Albums (Top 100 Mexico)	15
New Zealand Albums (RMNZ)	27
Polish Albums (ZPAV)	5
Spanish Albums (PROMUSICAE)	7
Swedish Albums (Sverigetopplistan)	10
Swedish Albums & Compilations (Sverigetopplistan)	13
Swiss Albums (Schweizer Hitparade)	5
UK Albums (OCC)	34
US Alternative Albums (Billboard)	4
US Billboard 200	18
US Tastemakers Albums (Billboard)	5
US Top Rock Albums (Billboard)	5
Worldwide Albums (IFPI)	7

Song charts (weekly)
Song	Peak position (2009)					
Song	IRE	BE (Wal)	CAN	NL	UK	US
"Get On Your Boots"	1	13	3	5	12	37
"Magnificent"	5	14	9	6	42	79
"I'll Go Crazy If I Don't Go Crazy Tonight"	7	18	5	14	32	–
"Moment of Surrender"	–	35	–	–	–	–
"No Line on the Horizon"	–	38	–	–	–	–
"–" denotes a release that did not chart or was not released in that territory.

== Certifications and sales ==
Region	Certification	Certified units/sales
Argentina (CAPIF)	Gold	20,000^{^}
Australia (ARIA)	Platinum	70,000^{^}
Austria (IFPI Austria)	Platinum	20,000^{*}
Belgium (BRMA)	Platinum	30,000^{*}
Brazil (Pro-Música Brasil)	Platinum	60,000^{*}
Canada (Music Canada)	2× Platinum	160,000^{^}
Denmark (IFPI Danmark)	2× Platinum	60,000^{^}
Finland (Musiikkituottajat)	Gold	17,019
France	—	63,000
GCC (IFPI Middle East)	Gold	3,000^{*}
Germany (BVMI)	Platinum	200,000^{^}
Greece (IFPI Greece)	Platinum	15,000^{^}
Hungary (MAHASZ)	Platinum	6,000^{^}
Ireland (IRMA)	4× Platinum	60,000^{^}
Italy (FIMI)	3× Platinum	210,000^{*}
Japan (RIAJ)	Gold	100,000^{^}
Mexico (AMPROFON)	Gold	40,000^{^}
Netherlands (NVPI)	2× Platinum	120,000^{^}
New Zealand (RMNZ)	Platinum	15,000^{^}
Portugal (AFP)	Platinum	20,000^{^}
Romania (UFPR)	Platinum	
Russia (NFPF)	Platinum	20,000^{*}
Spain (Promusicae)	Platinum	80,000^{^}
Sweden (GLF)	Platinum	40,000^{^}
Switzerland (IFPI Switzerland)	Platinum	30,000^{^}
United Kingdom (BPI)	Platinum	300,000^{^}
United States (RIAA)	Platinum	1,200,000
Summaries
Europe (IFPI)	Platinum	1,000,000^{*}
^{*} Sales figures based on certification alone.^{^} Shipments figures based on certification alone.

== See also ==
- List of certified albums in Romania
