= Stand Up Comedy (song) =

Song by U2

from the album No Line on the Horizon
- Released: 27 February 2009
- Genre: Alternative rock, funk rock
- Length: 3:50
- Label: Island
- Composer: U2
- Lyricist: Bono
- Producers: Brian Eno and Daniel Lanois, with additional production by Declan Gaffney

"Stand Up Comedy" is a song by Irish rock band U2. It is the seventh track on their 2009 album No Line on the Horizon. The track was first developed during the recording sessions in Fez, Morocco, but the band struggled to complete the song and it was recreated numerous times over the following 16 months. It underwent several title changes during this time, being referred to first as "For Your Love", then "Stand Up", and finally "Stand Up Comedy".

The song's lyrics were inspired by the 2008 Stand Up and Take Action campaign, and several lines reflect singer Bono's sense of hubris. Reception towards the song was mixed, though numerous reviews likened the track's guitar riffs to Led Zeppelin.

== Writing and recording ==
"Stand Up Comedy" went through several different iterations throughout the No Line on the Horizon sessions. It was originally developed during the first two weeks of recording in Fez, Morocco. The song is composed in the key of F♯ minor. In its original concept, the track contained mandolins playing in a Middle Eastern beat. The riff was altered and the lyric "for your love" was introduced as a chant in the chorus. However the band felt that the new guitar part was too similar to that of The Kinks song "You Really Got Me", and the lyrics too reminiscent of The Yardbirds song of the same name, so this version was discarded. U2 redeveloped the song with a new riff, melody, and lyrics, with only the "for your love" vocal remaining. Guitarist the Edge's collaboration with Jimmy Page and Jack White on the 2009 film It Might Get Loud resulted in their influence being felt in the new guitar part. The Edge felt the guitar riffs were one of his best. The band continued struggling to finalize the song during the final recording sessions in December 2008, 16 months after it was first developed in Fez. The lyrics were rewritten again during this time. At this point the song had been renamed several times, with various album pre-release interviews calling it "For Your Love" and "Stand Up".

"It's saying, stand up to rock stars. That's about choosing your enemies, too. What are you gonna stand up for and what are you gonna stand up against? I love the notion of standing up to rock stars. Because they are a bunch of fucking megalomaniacs."

—Bono on the lyrical meaning behind "Stand Up Comedy".

Producer and co-writer Daniel Lanois noted the track had been recreated so many times that six different songs had been written as a result. He likened "Stand Up Comedy"'s creation to the popular YouTube video Evolution of Dance, noting that it had been rewritten so many times that it was "a study in itself". Producer and co-writer Brian Eno felt that the band had taken the song and "work[ed] it into the ground, then work[ed] it back to life again," noting that it was a "frustrating" process. U2 believed that the completed result at the end of the recording sessions was "a great song", but they also felt that the end result would seem too "crafted" to listeners. An older mix was ultimately chosen for inclusion on the album instead.

The lyrics of "Stand Up Comedy" were inspired by the Stand Up and Take Action campaign, an event in 2008 where 116 million people from 131 countries reminded the leaders of countries of their promise to reduce poverty by 2015. Bono noted that the theme is "not a 'let's hold hands and the world is a better place sort of song.' It's more kick down the door of your own hypocrisy." Several of the song's lyrics stem from Bono mocking his sense of hubris and his fear that his activism and campaigning will go too far, making him unable to measure up to his ideals. Josh Tyrangiel of Time noted that the song was "explicitly told through Bono's rose-colored specs". The lyrics "Stand up to rock stars" and "Beware of small men with big ideas" reflect this inner doubt; Bono believed that the latter line was the funniest on the album.

== Appearances in other media ==
"Stand Up Comedy" is the eighth track in the Anton Corbijn film Linear, based on a story by Corbijn and Bono where a Parisian traffic cop travels across France and the Mediterranean Sea to visit his girlfriend in Tripoli. During the sequence the cop, played by Saïd Taghmaoui, resumes his journey through the mountains after his lunch. It ends with his deciding to make a stop in Cádiz where the next track, "Get on Your Boots", begins.

== Reception ==
Critical reception towards "Stand Up Comedy" was mixed. BBC Music's Chris Jones felt the track was a classic U2 song, calling it "a rowdy, grand gesture urging you to 'stand up for love' as only U2 can." He cited the lyric "stop helping God across the road like a little old lady" as one of the best lines that Bono had ever written. Q described bassist Adam Clayton and drummer Larry Mullen Jr.'s playing as "bring[ing] forth U2's hitherto unrevealed funky side," also noting that the track was "propelled by some coruscating Edge guitar work", which was described as reminiscent of Led Zeppelin. Rolling Stone felt that the lyrics had "an almost hip-hop-like cadence," while calling The Edge's guitar riff a cross between The Beatles' "Come Together" and Led Zeppelin's "Heartbreaker". Uncut felt that some of Bono's vocals echoed the band's 1984 single "Pride (In the Name of Love)" in their delivery.

Allmusic was disappointed by the song, describing it as "hamfisted white-boy funk" and suggesting that the absence of co-writers Daniel Lanois and Brian Eno was the reason it seemed "stilted." NME called the song "astonishingly uninteresting" and a "bog-standard rock song," likening it to an outtake from the How to Dismantle an Atomic Bomb sessions. Spin believed the song was a clumsy attempt to "adopt a self-conscious Zoo TV swagger", noting that the result "exposes Bono's dodgier wordplay."
