= Moment of Surrender =

Song by U2

from the album No Line on the Horizon
- Released: 27 February 2009
- Recorded: May–June 2007
- Studio: Riad El Yacout (Fez, Morocco)
- Genre: Rock, gospel
- Length: 7:24
- Label: Island
- Composers: U2; Brian Eno; Daniel Lanois
- Lyricist: Bono
- Producers: Brian Eno; Daniel Lanois

Audio sample
- "Moment of Surrender": file; help

"Moment of Surrender" is a song by rock band U2 and the third track on their 2009 album No Line on the Horizon. During the initial recording sessions for the album in 2007 in Fez, Morocco, the band wrote the song with producers Brian Eno and Daniel Lanois within a few hours. Together, they recorded the song in a single take; Eno called the song's recording "the most amazing studio experience [he's] ever had". According to him and Lanois, the track is the closest the band came to realising their original concept for the album of writing "future hymns". The seven-minute song features gospel-like vocals in the chorus, along with a predominantly organ- and piano-based musical accompaniment. Lyrically, the song is about a drug addict who is undergoing a crisis of faith.

"Moment of Surrender" was praised by critics, many of whom called it one of the album's stand-out tracks. The song was compared to the group's earlier ballads "With or Without You" and "One". It was performed at all but two of the band's concerts on the U2 360° Tour, most often as the closing song. During performances, the stage lights were dimmed and fans were urged to hold up their mobile phones to create "a stadium full of tiny stars". Although it was not released as a single, Rolling Stone named "Moment of Surrender" the best song of 2009, and in 2010, they ranked it 160th on their list of "The 500 Greatest Songs of All Time".

== Writing and recording ==
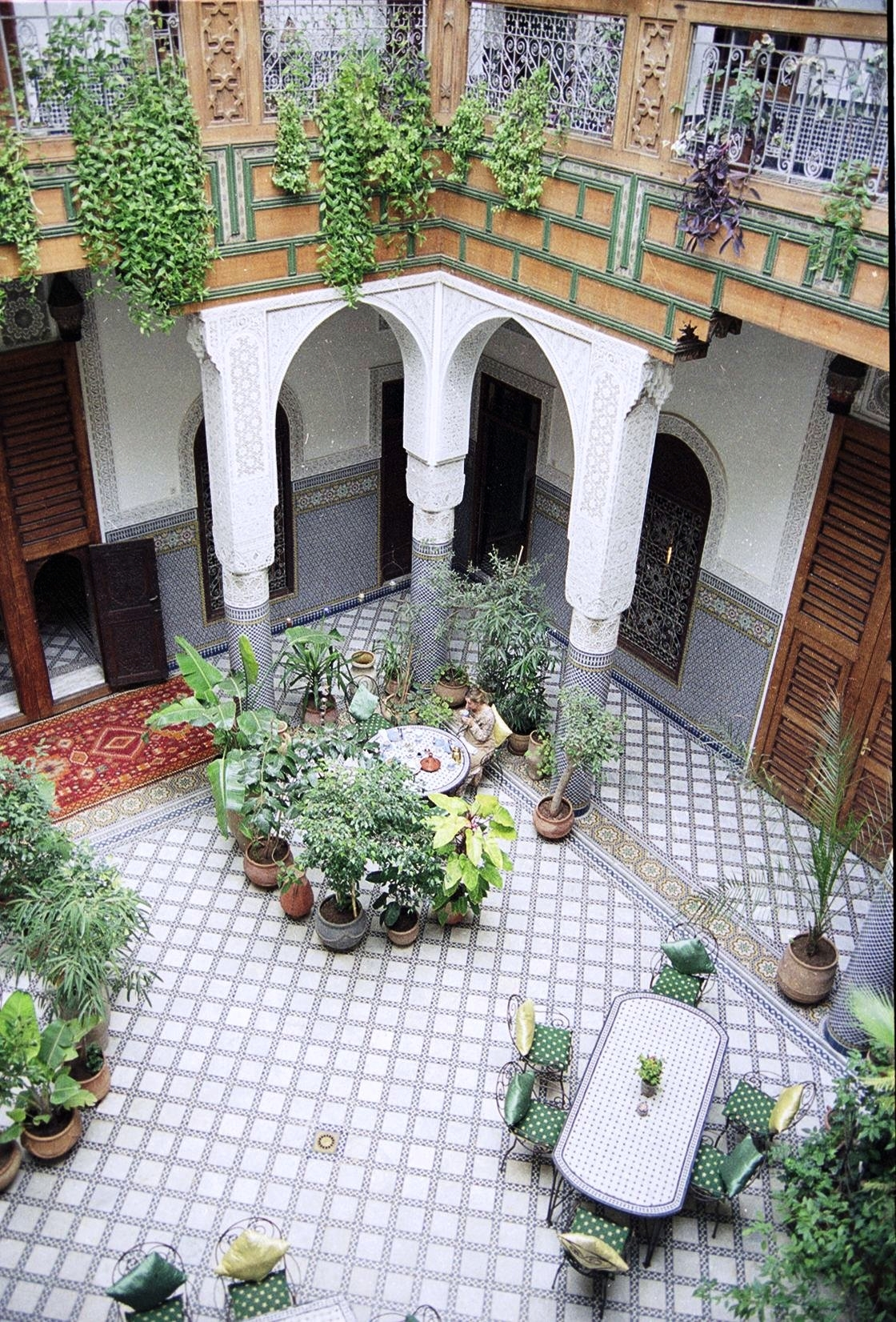
In 2007, U2, Brian Eno, and Daniel Lanois recorded "Moment of Surrender" in a Moroccan Riad similar to the one pictured.

"Moment of Surrender" was written by U2 and No Line on the Horizon producers/co-writers Brian Eno and Daniel Lanois during a two-week recording session in Fez, Morocco between May and June 2007. The song was developed within a few hours, and then recorded in a single take in a riad of the hotel Riad El Yacout. Eno began by creating a percussion loop of a "rolling hand drum" so that the band would have something to improvise along with when they joined him for songwriting and recording. However, Eno had not arranged the loop properly and the result was a strange, uneven beat that he compared to "a wheeled carriage that had one of the wheels a bit cracked" or "the way a camel moves". Although Eno was trying to fix the loop, drummer Larry Mullen Jr. began playing along to it. Eno then asked guitarist the Edge to play some chords. After a quick discussion about the chord changes and the meter (in which they decided to have a "funny layout" that was not based on "eights or sixteens"), the six of them improvised the entirety of the piece.

As they began to play, bassist Adam Clayton developed a bassline. The part was originally based on the Grandmaster Melle Mel song "White Lines (Don't Don't Do It)" before Clayton changed to a more trance-like bassline. Vocalist Bono created some melodies and sang over the music. During the album's recording, Bono had become tired of writing in the first-person and he began writing lyrics and singing from the perspective of different characters. During the writing of "Moment of Surrender", Bono assumed the character of a drug addict having a crisis of faith. The song title was borrowed from the Alcoholics Anonymous term for when an addict admits being "powerless over alcohol" and needs help. Bono had attempted to use the phrase "vision over visibility" in the lyrics of earlier songs; however, "Moment of Surrender" was the first song where he felt it was appropriate to be used. Eno called Bono's singing in this character as "so heartbreaking agonized and vulnerable", creating a feeling like "a knife to the heart". Lanois contributed by developing the gospel-like chorus. The uneven hi-hat from the drum part stems from Mullen's electronic drum kit malfunctioning during the song's recording. Eno was amazed by each performer's ability to develop and play their part without any instructions or cues. After the song's recording completed, everyone present, including a gathering of production personnel and visitors, was completely silent; Eno suggested it was as if they had gone on an "emotional adventure of some kind". He called the song's recording "the most amazing studio experience I've ever had", and he believes the "emotional crescendo" heard in the song properly captures how they felt as they improvised the piece. Bono stated "it was a spell and we were in it".

The song was played only once and received minor treatments afterwards, with the addition of a cello part in the introduction and some editing, which included removing a verse to reduce the song's length. Eno was outraged that U2 wanted to shorten the song, and he was adamant that the band not alter the original track too much, saying, "These fucking guys, they're supposed to be so spiritual—they don't spot a miracle when it hits them in the face. Nothing like that ever happened to me in the studio in my whole life." The band's original concept for No Line on the Horizon was to create an album of "future hymns"—songs that would be played forever. According to Eno and Lanois, "Moment of Surrender" is the closest the band came to reaching that concept.

== Composition ==
"Moment of Surrender" is played in common time at a tempo of 87 beats per minute in a key of A minor. The song makes use of the conventional verse-chorus form. The song begins with an uneven percussion loop, before an ambient synthesiser fades in and the drums enter at 0:08. A cello part joins and the synthesiser plays the chord progression C–Am–F–C–G–E–D_{7}. At the end of the progression, 47 seconds into the song, the intensity of the synthesiser rises before an organ, bass guitar, and piano subsequently enter. At 1:16, Bono's vocals enter and the first verse begins, lasting three stanzas. After the first chorus concludes and the second verse begins at 2:59, the Edge begins playing a guitar riff. The second verse lasts two stanzas. After the second chorus, a piano interlude begins, with Lanois contributing pedal steel. The Edge begins a slide guitar solo at 4:59 that many critics compared to the playing style of Pink Floyd's David Gilmour. After the third chorus ends at 6:11, "Oh-oh-ohhh" vocals and a guitar figure bring the song to its conclusion.

Lanois noted that the song had a very "Canadian sound" that was like a tribute to the Band, calling it the "Simcoe sound". Rolling Stone said the song "merges a Joshua Tree-style gospel feel with a hypnotically loping bass line and a syncopated beat". The song makes prominent use of organ and piano.

== Reception ==
"Moment of Surrender" was well received by critics after the release of No Line on the Horizon. David Fricke of Rolling Stone enjoyed the song, writing, "The rising-falling effect of the harmony voices around Bono... is a perfect picture of where he really wants to be, when he gets to the line about 'vision over visibility.'" Blender considered it the high-point of the album, comparing it to the band's 1987 single "I Still Haven't Found What I'm Looking For". Reviewer Rob Sheffield complimented the melding of bass, guitar, and vocals, calling it "the kind of gimme-divinity anthem that U2 cut their teeth on, except it really does seem like they've gotten better at these songs now that they've picked up some bummed-out adult grit. Bono actually sounds scared of something in this song, and whether his nightmares are religious or sexual, the fear gives his voice some heft." NME felt that it was the "most impressive" song on the album, describing it as a "gorgeously sparse prayer built around Adam Clayton's heartbeat bassline and Bono's rough growl", and noting that despite its seven-minute length, it did not feel too long. Alexis Petridis of The Guardian was more critical of the song, saying it "doesn't have enough of a tune to support the full seven-minute gospel treatment", a sentiment that The Times agreed with.

Spin reviewed the track favourably, calling it a "celebrity-at-the-crossroads soul ballad" with an "ambient gospel sweep that's both haunted and joyful". Mojo praised the song's musicianship, saying it was "graced by swaggering performances" and that the Edge's "languid guitar solo" was reminiscent of David Gilmour. Q echoed these sentiments, commending Bono's soulful singing and the Edge's solo. The reviewer christened the song as "this album's 'One' or 'With or Without You', with added bonus points". The Washington Post called the song one of the record's highlights and enjoyed the track's gospel qualities. The reviewer wrote, "The vocal harmonies on the choruses sound like something out of a church in some distant, dystopian world; the woozy, slightly detuned piano adds to that impression..." Hot Press gave the song a favourable review, calling it a "sweeping" track and suggesting it "conjure[s] the same spiritual vibe as Marvin Gaye's 'Abraham, Martin & John'". Time gave No Line on the Horizon a negative review, but praised "Moment of Surrender" for its "heartbreaking melody" and Bono's "Oh-oh-oh" vocals that reminded the critic of the end of "With or Without You". Bono and Daniel Lanois both cited the song as their favourite track on the album, and Brian Eno thought the band should have chosen it as the album's first single. Musician Gavin Friday described the song as "Al Green on Irish steroids", and Hot Press editor Niall Stokes called it "a modern rock classic" that will "stand forever as one of U2's most inspirational creations".

Despite not being released as a single, "Moment of Surrender" charted in two countries. In the United States, the song appeared on the Mediabase Triple A chart at number 45 for the week of 17 November 2009. In Belgium, the song appeared on the Ultratop 40 Singles Chart (Wallonia) for a week at number 35.

== Live performances ==
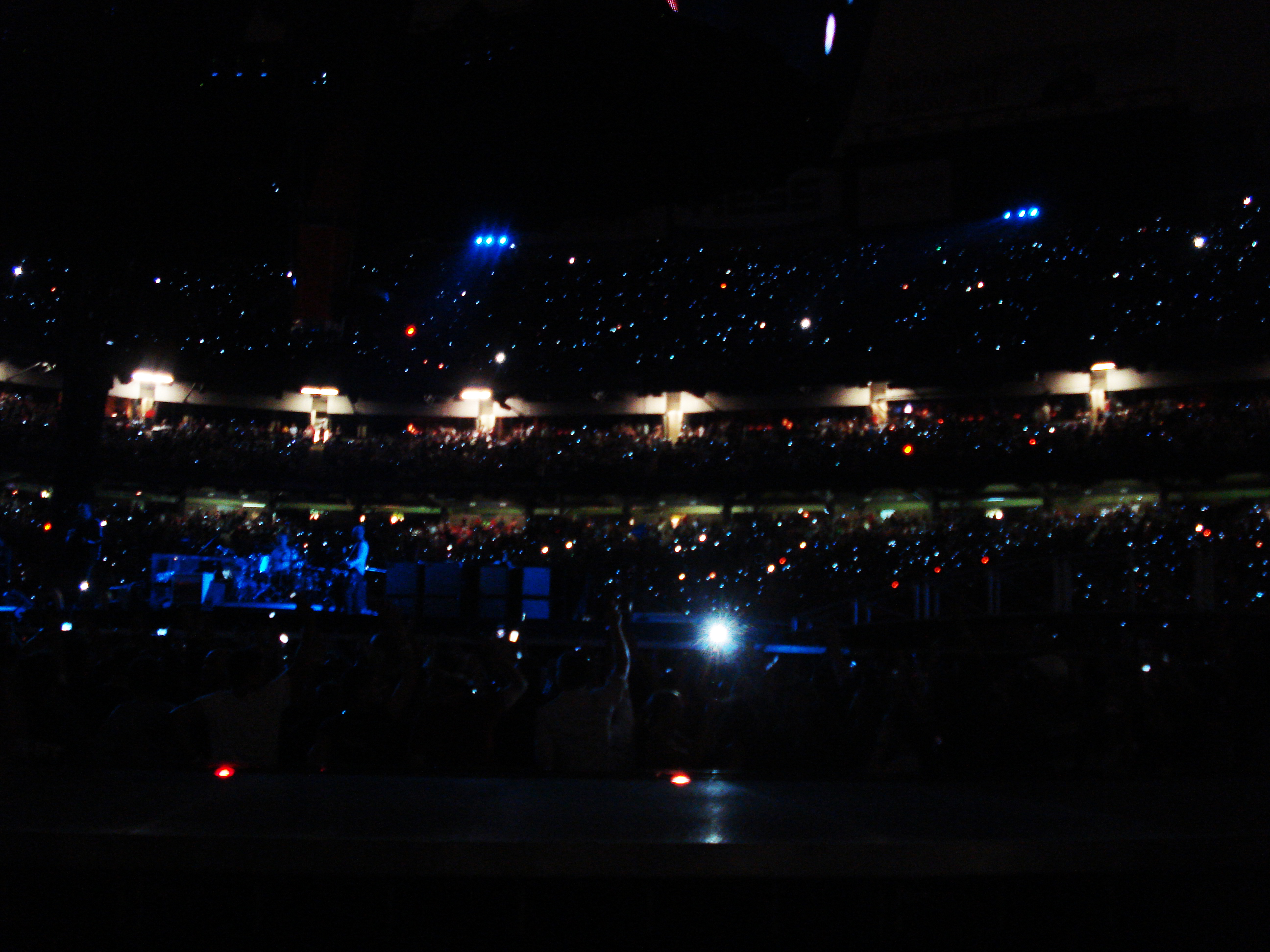
During performances of the song, the band encouraged fans to take out their mobile phones for visual effect.

"Moment of Surrender" made its live debut on the opening night of the U2 360° Tour in Barcelona, Spain during the encore, as the show's final song. It was played at nearly every subsequent concert on the tour as the closing song, being excluded from the set list for only two of the tour's 110 shows: the 9 December 2010 concert in Brisbane, Australia and the 29 May 2011 concert in Winnipeg. Prior to performances of "Moment of Surrender", a disco ball was lowered and the stage lights turned off, and Bono encouraged fans to take out their mobile phones and create "a stadium full of tiny stars". The National Post commented that despite being a "big-concert cliché", the move was effective and created a feeling of intimacy amongst the audience. Rolling Stone enjoyed the visual effect in context of the tour's space theme, saying it "truly made it seem like the stadium had reached outerspace, with thousands of cellphone lights turning into stars". The Daily Telegraph praised the "galaxy of mobile phones", saying that despite the tour's impressive stage and visual effects, "the most beautiful sight came when we couldn't see [the stage]". In reviewing a Paris show from July 2009, the Sunday Times called "Moment of Surrender" the only track from No Line on the Horizon performed that evening that was strong enough to deserve inclusion with the rest of the show's set list. NME was not as receptive to the song in a live setting, questioning the decision to end concerts with the song. A U2 360° Tour performance of "Moment of Surrender" appears on the group's 2010 concert video U2 360° at the Rose Bowl. In a review of the film, Andrew Mueller of Uncut called "Moment of Surrender" an "[i]ll-chosen closer", as well as "overlong and under-realised". In 2009, the song was performed by the band on the 35th-season premiere of Saturday Night Live, and at the Brandenburg Gate in Berlin to celebrate the 20th anniversary of the fall of the Berlin Wall. On 18 June 2011, Bono closed the song with lyrics from "Jungleland" to honor the recently deceased E Street Band saxophonist Clarence Clemons. The song was also one of only three non-single tracks to be played by the band in their headline set at the Glastonbury Festival 2011.

== Legacy ==
"Moment of Surrender" appeared on several music publications' "best of" lists for 2009 and the 2000s decade. Esquire called "Moment of Surrender" one of "The 10 Best Songs You (Probably) Didn't Hear in 2009". Rolling Stone ranked it the best song of 2009 and the 36th-best song of the decade, calling it "The most devastating ballad U2 – or anyone – has delivered since 'One.'" In Rolling Stone's voting for the decade's best song, Metallica drummer Lars Ulrich placed "Moment of Surrender" in the number-one spot on his ballot. Rolling Stone updated its list of "The 500 Greatest Songs of All Time" in 2010 and placed "Moment of Surrender" at number 160—just one year after the song's release—marking the fourth-best position of any U2 song on the list as well as the third-best placement for any song made after 2000.

"Moment of Surrender" is the tenth track in the Anton Corbijn film Linear, based on a story by Corbijn and Bono where a Parisian traffic cop travels across France and the Mediterranean Sea to visit his girlfriend in Tripoli. During the sequence, the cop (played by Saïd Taghmaoui), leaves the bar and begins to wander the streets of Cádiz at night, eventually making his way down to the beach where he falls asleep on the sand. In the morning he wakes up and the next track, "Cedars of Lebanon", begins.

A live performance of "Moment of Surrender" taken from an 18 September 2010 concert in Paris appeared on the group's 2010 live EP Wide Awake in Europe.

== Credits and personnel ==
- Additional keyboards – Terry Lawless
- Cello – Caroline Dale
- Production – Brian Eno and Daniel Lanois
- Engineering – Richard Rainey
- Engineering assistance – Chris Heaney
- Additional engineering – Declan Gaffney, and Carl Glanville
- Mixing – Daniel Lanois and Declan Gaffney
- Mixing assistance – Tom Hough, Dave Clauss, and Dave Emery

== Charts ==
Chart (2009)	Peak
Belgium Singles Chart (Wallonia)	35
Italy (Musica e Dischi)	19
U.S. Mediabase Triple A	45
