= No Line on the Horizon (song) =

Song by U2

from the album No Line on the Horizon
- Released: 27 February 2009
- Genre: Rock
- Length: 4:12
- Label: Island
- Composers: U2, Brian Eno, and Daniel Lanois
- Lyricist: Bono
- Producers: Brian Eno and Daniel Lanois, with additional production by Steve Lillywhite

Audio sample
- "No Line on the Horizon": file; help

"No Line on the Horizon" is a song by rock band U2; it is the opening and title track on their 2009 album No Line on the Horizon. An alternate version, "No Line on the Horizon 2", was included as a bonus track on some versions of the album. The song was developed during the band's earliest sessions in Fez, Morocco, and began with a drum beat by drummer Larry Mullen, Jr. The lyrics were inspired by a photograph of Lake Constance, titled Boden Sea. Many reviews of the song compared it to the band's other guitar-heavy songs, including "Elevation", "Vertigo", "Zoo Station", and "The Fly".

== Writing and recording ==
"No Line on the Horizon" was first developed during the recording sessions in Fez, Morocco, and was recorded in one take. "No Line on the Horizon" stemmed from drummer Larry Mullen Jr. experimenting with several different drum beats; producer and co-writer Brian Eno sampled and manipulated the patterns, and the rest of the band began to play over it. The guitar in "No Line on the Horizon" was developed through a Death by Audio distortion box; the idea to use it was suggested to guitarist the Edge by Ben Curtis of the Secret Machines. After hearing the song Curtis noted that it "blew my mind... he's using that pedal in a textural way that it wasn't intended to be used at all."

Lead singer Bono was inspired to write the lyrics after seeing a photograph of Lake Constance titled Boden Sea; the image had taken by Japanese photographer Hiroshi Sugimoto. Bono had the idea of a place "where the sea meets the sky and you can't tell the difference between the two". When it came to recording the song, producer and co-writer Daniel Lanois stated that "the vocal happened very early on, that whole - a-whoawhoawhoawhoa! - that little hook. The vocal delivery, the vibe was there right from day one." Bono noted that the overlying theme behind the song was infinity, and that the track was inherently optimistic. The Boden Sea image would later become the album's cover art.

By the end of the recording sessions in December 2008, two versions of the track existed; the first was a slower, more atmospheric composition, while the second was faster and less layered. The former was chosen for the album while the latter was renamed "No Line on the Horizon 2" and released as a bonus track on the Japanese, Australian, and iTunes versions of the album, as well as a B-side to the "Get on Your Boots" single. Along with "Fez – Being Born" and "Get on Your Boots", "No Line on the Horizon" was one of three candidates to open the album. The band eventually decided that "No Line on the Horizon" was the best selection.

== Composition ==
Q described "No Line on the Horizon" as an "Unforgettable Fire-esque slow burner that builds to a euphoric coda", and "No Line on the Horizon 2" as "a punk-y Pixies/Buzzcocks homage that proceeds at a breathless pace." Rolling Stone called the song a "combination of garage-organ drone, fat guitar distortion and Mullen's parade-ground drumming". Spin felt that Bono's "whoa-oh's" gave the song a gritty feel.

== Live performances ==
"No Line on the Horizon" was first played live during the No Line on the Horizon promotional tour at a filming for the BBC's The Culture Show. It was performed at almost every concert during the first two legs of the U2 360° Tour, with a new acoustic arrangement being played once during the tour's third leg. The song has not been played since 2010, but it was rehearsed before the Innocence + Experience Tour in an acoustic arrangement which was not performed on tour.

== Appearances in other media ==
"No Line on the Horizon" appears as the fifth track in the Anton Corbijn film Linear, based on a story by Corbijn and Bono in which a Parisian traffic cop travels across France and the Mediterranean Sea to visit his girlfriend in Tripoli. During the sequence, the cop, played by Saïd Taghmaoui, continues on his journey through the Spanish countryside until pulling into a small town for lunch where the next track, "Fez - Being Born", begins.

== Reception ==
Reception to "No Line on the Horizon" was mostly positive. Allmusic praised the track, saying that "U2 strike that unmistakable blend of soaring, widescreen sonics and unflinching openhearted emotion that's been their trademark, turning the intimate into something hauntingly universal," also noting that it "resonate[s] deeper and longer than anything on Atomic Bomb". NME likened the song to "Vertigo" while saying "thanks to the Edge pressing the button marked 'freight train' rather than 'annoying echo' on his guitar, ["No Line on the Horizon"] throbs with a refound passion and remains peppered with new sounds and textures." Uncut enjoyed the song, saying it "crashes in like a wave over the bows, washes of keyboards retreating to reveal a growling guitar riff retreaded from "The Fly", and one of U2's most memorably anthemic choruses." Mojo, while commenting that the track echoed the band's 1991 song "Zoo Station", felt that Bono dragged the song down, commenting that he "strain[s] for dramatic tension, lapses horribly into Chris Martinese, both in his mannered vocal inflection and screeds of lyrical twaddle." Pitchfork Media was not impressed with the song, saying that its "hard-nosed verse is torpedoed by its deflating fart of a hook." Time rated it the third best song of 2009.

== Personnel ==
- Bono – vocals, guitar
- The Edge – guitar, backing vocals
- Adam Clayton – bass guitar
- Larry Mullen Jr. – drums, percussion

== Charts ==
Chart (2009)	Peak position
Belgium (Ultratop 50 Wallonia)	38

== Certifications ==
Region	Certification	Certified units/sales
Brazil (Pro-Música Brasil)	Platinum	60,000^{*}
^{*} Sales figures based on certification alone.
