= White as Snow (song) =

Song by U2

from the album No Line on the Horizon
- Released: 27 February 2009
- Genre: Folk rock
- Length: 4:41
- Label: Island
- Composers: Traditional, arr. U2 with Brian Eno and Daniel Lanois
- Lyricists: U2 with Eno and Lanois
- Producers: Eno, Lanois

Audio sample
- "White as Snow": file; help

"White as Snow" is a song by Irish rock band U2 and the ninth track on their 2009 album No Line on the Horizon. It was written from the perspective of a dying soldier serving in Afghanistan, and lasts the length of time it takes him to die. The track is based on the hymn "Veni, veni Emmanuel."

== Inspiration ==
U2 were asked by Jim Sheridan to write a song for his 2009 film Brothers. Bono noted that Sheridan wanted a "complex song for a complex character" and so the band wrote two songs: "Winter" and "White as Snow". While "Winter" is a "more universal song about the experience of the armed forces in Afghanistan", "White as Snow" focuses more on the relationship between the Cahill brothers. The band preferred "Winter" for the film, but as they also wanted to include the track on No Line on the Horizon they struggled to complete it in time for the film's planned release date. "White as Snow" was selected to be used in its place, though the push back of the film's release date meant that the band could finish "Winter" and it was ultimately used instead.

== Writing, recording, and composition ==
In an interview with The Guardian, lead singer Bono revealed that he became tired of writing in the first-person, noting that "I'd just worn myself out as a subject matter"; as a result he created several characters, including a traffic cop, a drug addict, and a soldier serving in Afghanistan. The soldier's character appears in "White as Snow", which focuses on the soldier's last thoughts as he dies from the wounds caused by an improvised explosive device. Bono came up with the idea after reading Pincher Martin, written by William Golding.

The melody of "White as Snow" is based on that of the traditional Advent hymn "Veni, veni Emmanuel". Stemming from a conversation on hymns with Bono, producer Daniel Lanois began to study the subject with Newfoundland musician Lori Anna Reid and asked her for some suggestions of hymns U2 could play. Reid came up with several suggestions, one of which was "Veni, veni Emmanuel"; Lanois recorded a piano rendition of the hymn for the band and laid down a vocal arrangement, noting "Bono had this "white as snow" idea. It just slowly came together." Lanois later stated that it was "no accident Reid's suggestion made the album."

The song was recorded in one take during two weeks of recording sessions in Fez, Morocco in 2007, though it received some minor editing in the final sessions in December 2008. At this time, it was taken out of the 'Maybe' pile to balance out the rockier tunes present earlier on, with bassist Adam Clayton noting that "it gave the listener a break." Bono noted that, with the exception of "White as Snow", the band had tried to keep the theme of war out of the album.

"White as Snow" runs for 4:41 (4 minutes, 41 seconds). According to Hal Leonard Corporation's sheet music published at Musicnotes.com, it is played in common time at a tempo of 88 beats per minute in the key of G major. Alternate sheet music by the same publisher states it is played at a tempo of 87 beats per minute in a key of E minor. The original plan was for the track to start with an explosion, though this was later scrapped. Richard Watkins played the French horn in the song.

== Reception ==
Rolling Stone described it as "mostly alpine quiet – guitar, keyboard, Bono and harmonies, like The Doors' "The Crystal Ship" crossed with an Appalachian ballad." Uncut labelled it as "the most modest and most affecting track on the record, and one of the best things Bono has ever sung." Time Out called it "the absolute highlight without any doubt" of the album, while The Guardian referred to it as "unadorned, evocative and suggestive", commenting that "you don't even have to know what it's about to feel its quiet power or sense its sadness". Mojo had a more negative impression of the song, stating "the music is as lumpy as the words."

"White as Snow" appears as the fourth track in the Anton Corbijn film Linear, based on a story by Corbijn and Bono where a Parisian traffic cop travels across France and the Mediterranean Sea to visit his girlfriend in Tripoli. During the sequence, the cop, played by Saïd Taghmaoui, pulls off the road and watches the clouds as they form into the shape of the African continent before falling asleep. It ends with him waking up and resuming his journey, where the next track, "No Line on the Horizon", begins.

== Personnel ==
U2

- Bono - lead vocals, guitar
- The Edge - guitar, backing vocals, piano
- Adam Clayton - bass guitar
- Larry Mullen Jr. - drums, percussion

Additional musicians

- Brian Eno - keyboards
- Richard Watkins - French horn
