= Caroline Dale =

British cellist

- Born: 1965 (age 60–61); Middlesbrough, England
- Genre: See article
- Occupation: Cellist
- Instrument: Cello
- Years active: 1978–present

Caroline Dale (born 1964) is a British cellist who currently plays principal cello for the English Chamber Orchestra and London Metropolitan Orchestra. She has also performed music for numerous films and played with a wide range of pop and rock musicians, including Joan Armatrading, Peter Gabriel, David Gilmour, David Gray, Oasis, Simply Red, Sinéad O'Connor and U2.

== Biography ==
Caroline Dale was born in Middlesbrough in 1964. She studied at the Royal Academy of Music in London with Florence Hooton, and later with Pierre Fournier in Geneva. In 1978, at the age of 13 she won the String Final of the BBC's Young Musician of the Year . At fifteen she was the youngest ever recipient of the Isserlis Scholarship. She was a member of the Nigel Kennedy Quartet and the Balanescu Quartet, was a founder member of the Apollo Piano Trio in 1997, and played cello with the Scottish Ensemble and the London Chamber Orchestra. As well as her current position as principal cellist of the English Chamber Orchestra, Dale has appeared as a soloist with a number of orchestras including the London Philharmonic and Royal Philharmonic orchestras.

Working with Nigel Kennedy in his quartet was a turning point for Dale. "He encouraged me to be a total musician who enjoys playing everything". Dale performed with Jimmy Page and Robert Plant during their 1994 tour promoting the album No Quarter. She appeared in the 1994 video for "Whatever" by Oasis. In 1998 she appeared on the debut recording of Ghostland, a trio also including producer John Reynolds and guitarist Justin Adams, fusing classical with contemporary styles, featuring lead vocals by Sinéad O’Connor, Cara Dillon and Jane Siberry. A follow-up, Interview with the Angel, was released in 2001.

She played with David Gilmour during his 2002 solo tour dates, and on his album On an Island. She appears on the David Gilmour in Concert DVD which was recorded at Robert Wyatt's Meltdown concert and the Royal Festival Hall concert, both in 2002. Also in 2002, Dale released Such Sweet Thunder, an album of classical music with performances of Handel's Sarabande from the D-minor harpsichord suite, and the Largo from Vivaldi's E minor Cello Sonata.

In 2008, she appeared, playing solo cello, at Ron Geesin's two performances of the "Atom Heart Mother Suite", with Pink Floyd Italian tribute band Mun Floyd, the Royal College Brass Ensemble, and the choral group Canticum. David Gilmour made a guest appearance on the second night.

She performed with David Gray during the "Live in Slow Motion" tour and again in 2014, and she contributed and played on his album Skellig, released in February 2021. Since the mid-1990s and up until as recently as 2007, she was Sinéad O'Connor's touring cellist. She often sang with O'Connor and her band on the song "In This Heart", from the 1994 album Universal Mother. Dale plays cello on a number of tracks on U2's 2009 album No Line on the Horizon.

She often collaborates with film composers Klaus Badelt, Ilan Eshkeri and Dario Marianelli. Scores featuring her playing include Truly, Madly, Deeply, Hilary and Jackie (about the life of Jacqueline du Pré), Fear and Loathing in Las Vegas, as well as the 2005 adaptation of Jane Austen's Pride and Prejudice and 2007's Atonement, in which she plays the solo cello part in Marianelli's Elegy for Dunkirk.

Together with pianist, composer, conductor Gavin Greenaway, Caroline Dale formed a duo called Cloud Chamber. The album Skylines was released in October 2026.
