= I'll Go Crazy If I Don't Go Crazy Tonight =

2009 single by U2

Single by U2

from the album No Line on the Horizon
- Released: 17 August 2009
- Genre: Pop rock
- Length: 4:14 (album, single and David O'Reilly video versions); 3:50 (radio and live video versions)
- Label: Mercury; Island
- Composer: U2
- Lyricist: Bono
- Producers: Steve Lillywhite; will.i.am (add.)

U2 singles chronology
"Magnificent" (2009)	"I'll Go Crazy If I Don't Go Crazy Tonight" (2009)	"I Will Follow (live from Glastonbury)" (2011)

Music video
- "I'll Go Crazy If I Don't Go Crazy Tonight" animated video on YouTube "I'll Go Crazy If I Don't Go Crazy Tonight" live video on YouTube

Audio sample
- "I'll Go Crazy If I Don't Go Crazy Tonight": file; help

"I'll Go Crazy If I Don't Go Crazy Tonight" is the fifth song from U2's 2009 album No Line on the Horizon. The song was released as the album's third single in a digital format on 25 August 2009 and in a physical version released on 7 September 2009. Two music videos were made, one directed by David O'Reilly, and one by Alex Courtes.

== Writing and recording ==
The band collaborated with will.i.am in the creation of the track; will.i.am receives an "additional production" credit on the finished version. It was first developed by Brian Eno under the title "Diorama" during a break in the recording sessions. The band reworked the track under the new title of "Crazy Tonight" before retitling it again as "I'll Go Crazy If I Don't Go Crazy Tonight". Several of the song's lyrics were influenced by Barack Obama's presidential campaign. Bono stated to Q magazine that the lyrics "[sound] like a T-shirt slogan to me", also noting that it was No Line on the Horizon's equivalent to "Beautiful Day".

== Live performances ==
"I'll Go Crazy If I Don't Go Crazy Tonight" was first played on 4 March 2009 on the Late Show with David Letterman, one of three performances of the song during No Line on the Horizon promotional appearances.

Redanka's "Kick the Darkness" remix arrangement of the song was played throughout the U2 360° Tour. Club feel lighting accompanied the song, while Larry Mullen Jr. walked around the outer stage playing a djembe. The performance in this unfamiliar style was intended to disorient the audience as the band moved from the "personal" first half of the concert into the "political" second half. (The only time the album version was performed during the tour was during the second show of the 360 Tour° in Barcelona where it was performed two times. For the first time the band played the remix and, then, as one of the encores, the album version was performed for a video shoot.)

== Music videos ==
The nurse examines the scratches on the runaway girl's face in the first music video.

The first music video received its world premiere on 17 July 2009 through U2's YouTube channel. Directed by David O'Reilly and designed by Jon Klassen, it is the band's first animated music video since 1995's "Hold Me, Thrill Me, Kiss Me, Kill Me", and is one of the few not to feature the band. It depicts several people in a city undergoing hardships, and the events that interconnect them and bring them happiness as they decide to make changes in their lives. The video was entered in the 2009 Ottawa International Animation Festival.

The second music video was directed by Alex Courtes and produced by Malachy Mcanenny. While the O'Reilly video plays over the studio version of the song, the Courtes version is the single edit. It consists of a live performance taken from the U2 360° Tour, filmed at Camp Nou in Barcelona, Spain, on 2 July 2009.

== Reception ==
Q called "I'll Go Crazy If I Don't Go Crazy Tonight" the band's "most unabashed pop song since 'Sweetest Thing'". while Mojo labelled it a "superficial pop anthem formed around a dainty kernel of pure melodic gold", calling the performance "[s]o cumulatively devastating is the band's delivery that it ennobles the succession of cute self-referential Bono homilies". Blender likened the "I'll Go Crazy If I Don't Go Crazy Tonight"'s piano parts to the hook of the Journey song "Faithfully", while Rolling Stone noted that the lyrics reflected Bono's inability to meet his own ideals. Rolling Stone also likened the "harrowing" beginning of the O'Reilly video to a Disney film, calling the animation "incredible". Eoin Butler, writing in The Irish Times' The Ticket supplement, was less enthused about the release, labelling it U2's "most lacklustre offering to date". The song was nominated in the categories "Best Rock Performance by a Duo or Group With Vocals" and "Best Rock Song" for the 52nd Grammy Awards in 2010.

== Release ==
In promotion "I'll Go Crazy If I Don't Go Crazy Tonight" was used in television commercials for a Blackberry application, called the "U2 Mobile App", which was developed as part of Research in Motion's sponsorship of the U2 360° Tour.

Date	Type
17 August 2009	Amazon.com MP3
25 August 2009	Digital EP
7 September 2009	CD

== Formats and track listings ==
All lyrics written by Bono, all music composed by U2, except "Magnificent" (music also by Brian Eno and Danny Lanois, and lyrics also by the Edge).

=== Promotional releases ===
CD (Island GOCRAZYCJ1 / Interscope INTR-12601-2)
No.	Title	Mixed by	Length
1.	"I'll Go Crazy If I Don't Go Crazy Tonight" (Radio edit)	Cenzo Townshend	3:50
2.	"I'll Go Crazy If I Don't Go Crazy Tonight" (Single version)	Cenzo Townshend	4:14

CD (Dirty South Mix) (Interscope INTR-12601-2)
No.	Title	Mixed by	Length
1.	"I'll Go Crazy If I Don't Go Crazy Tonight" (Dirty South full mix)	Dirty South	7:10
2.	"I'll Go Crazy If I Don't Go Crazy Tonight" (Dirty South radio mix)	Dirty South	4:26

=== Commercial releases ===
7-inch (Mercury 2716223)
No.	Title	Mixed by	Length
1.	"I'll Go Crazy If I Don't Go Crazy Tonight" (Single version)	Cenzo Townshend	4:14
2.	"I'll Go Crazy If I Don't Go Crazy Tonight" (Dirty South radio mix)	Dirty South	4:27

12-inch (Interscope B0013377-11)
No.	Title	Mixed by	Length
1.	"I'll Go Crazy If I Don't Go Crazy Tonight" (Single version)	Cenzo Townshend	4:13
2.	"I'll Go Crazy If I Don't Go Crazy Tonight" (Fish Out of Water remix)	Declan Gaffney and Matt Paul	4:37
3.	"I'll Go Crazy If I Don't Go Crazy Tonight" (Dirty South full mix)	Dirty South	7:10
4.	"I'll Go Crazy If I Don't Go Crazy Tonight" (Redanka's "Kick the Darkness" vocal version)	Andy Holt	7:30
5.	"I'll Go Crazy If I Don't Go Crazy Tonight" (Redanka's "Sparks of Light" dub version)	Andy Holt	7:28

CD 1 with videos link (Interscope B0013376-22 / Mercury 2716225)
No.	Title	Mixed by	Length
1.	"I'll Go Crazy If I Don't Go Crazy Tonight" (Single version)	Cenzo Townshend	4:14
2.	"I'll Go Crazy If I Don't Go Crazy Tonight" (Fish Out of Water mix)	Declan Gaffney and Matt Paul	4:37
3.	"I'll Go Crazy If I Don't Go Crazy Tonight" (Dirty South full mix)	Dirty South	7:10
4.	"I'll Go Crazy If I Don't Go Crazy Tonight" (Redanka's "Kick the Darkness" vocal version)	Andy Holt	7:30
5.	"I'll Go Crazy If I Don't Go Crazy Tonight" (Redanka's "Sparks of Light" dub version)	Andy Holt	7:28
6.	"I'll Go Crazy If I Don't Go Crazy Tonight" (Redanka's "Kick the Darkness" instrumental version)	Andy Holt	7:28
7.	"I'll Go Crazy If I Don't Go Crazy Tonight" (Video – Directed by David O'Reilly)		4:15
8.	"I'll Go Crazy If I Don't Go Crazy Tonight" (Video – Directed by Alex Courtes)		3:50

CD 2 (Mercury 2716226, 2717700)
No.	Title	Mixed by	Length
1.	"I'll Go Crazy If I Don't Go Crazy Tonight" (Single version)	Cenzo Townshend	4:14
2.	"Magnificent" (Live at the Somerville Theatre, Boston, Massachusetts, March 2009)	Declan Gaffney	5:08

=== Digital releases ===
Amazon.com live release
No.	Title	Length
1.	"I'll Go Crazy If I Don't Go Crazy Tonight" (Live at the Somerville Theatre, Boston, Massachusetts, March 2009)	4:26
2.	"I'll Go Crazy If I Don't Go Crazy Tonight" (Alex Courtes video)	3:50
3.	"I'll Go Crazy If I Don't Go Crazy Tonight" (David O'Reilly video)	4:24

Amazon.com EP release
No.	Title	Mixed by	Length
1.	"I'll Go Crazy If I Don't Go Crazy Tonight" (Single version)	Cenzo Townshend	4:13
2.	"I'll Go Crazy If I Don't Go Crazy Tonight" (Dirty South full mix)	Dirty South	7:10
3.	"I'll Go Crazy If I Don't Go Crazy Tonight" (Redanka's "Sparks of Light" dub version)	Andy Holt	7:28

iTunes Store release
No.	Title	Mixed by	Length
1.	"I'll Go Crazy If I Don't Go Crazy Tonight" (Single version)	Cenzo Townshend	4:13
2.	"I'll Go Crazy If I Don't Go Crazy Tonight" (Fish Out of Water mix)	Declan Gaffney and Matt Paul	4:37
3.	"I'll Go Crazy If I Don't Go Crazy Tonight" (Dirty South full mix)	Dirty South	7:10
4.	"I'll Go Crazy If I Don't Go Crazy Tonight" (Redanka's "Kick the Darkness" vocal version)	Andy Holt	7:30
5.	"I'll Go Crazy If I Don't Go Crazy Tonight" (Redanka's "Sparks of Light" dub version)	Andy Holt	7:28
6.	"I'll Go Crazy If I Don't Go Crazy Tonight" (Redanka's "Kick the Darkness" instrumental version)	Andy Holt	7:28
7.	"I'll Go Crazy If I Don't Go Crazy Tonight" (David O'Reilly video)		4:15
8.	"I'll Go Crazy If I Don't Go Crazy Tonight" (Alex Courtes video)		3:50
9.	"Digital Booklet"

== Credits and personnel ==
Credits adapted from No Line on the Horizon liner notes.

- U2 – music
- Bono – lyrics
- Steve Lillywhite – producer, mixer
- will.i.am – additional production and keyboards
- CJ Eiriksson – engineer, mixer
- Tom Hough – assistant engineer
- Declan Gaffney – additional engineering
- Dave Emery – assistant mixer
- Caroline Dale – cello
- Cathy Thompson – violin
- Terry Lawless – additional keyboards

== Charts ==
Chart (2009)	Peak Position
Austria (Ö3 Austria Top 40)	34
Belgium (Ultratop 50 Flanders)	18
Belgium (Ultratop 50 Wallonia)	18
Canada Hot 100 (Billboard)	72
Canada (Nielsen SoundScan)	5
France (SNEP)	21
Germany (GfK)	40
Ireland (IRMA)	7
Italy (Musica e Dischi)	24
Netherlands (Single Top 100)	14
Scottish Singles Sales (Official Charts)	1
Spain (Promusicae)	32
Sweden (Sverigetopplistan)	47
Switzerland (Schweizer Hitparade)	49
UK Singles (Official Charts)	32
US Adult Alternative Airplay (Billboard)	2
US Adult Pop Airplay (Billboard)	23
US Alternative Airplay (Billboard)	31
US Dance Singles Sales (Billboard)	2
US Hot Rock & Alternative Songs (Billboard)	27

== See also ==
- List of covers of U2 songs - I'll Go Crazy If I Don't Go Crazy Tonight
