= Magnificent (U2 song) =

2009 single by U2

Single by U2

from the album No Line on the Horizon
- Released: May 4, 2009 (CD, UK iTunes); May 18, 2009 (US/CAN iTunes)
- Genre: Rock
- Length: 5:24 (album version); 4:21 (radio edit)
- Label: Interscope; Mercury
- Composers: U2; Brian Eno; Daniel Lanois
- Lyricists: Bono; the Edge
- Producers: Brian Eno; Daniel Lanois; Steve Lillywhite

U2 singles chronology
"Get On Your Boots" (2009)	"Magnificent" (2009)	"I'll Go Crazy If I Don't Go Crazy Tonight" (2009)

Music video
- "Magnificent" on YouTube

"Magnificent" is a song by U2. It is the second track on the band's 2009 album No Line on the Horizon and was released as the album's second single. The song was originally titled "French Disco", but was renamed later in the recording sessions. It is played before the start of every New York Rangers home game at Madison Square Garden.

The single was released on 4 May 2009 and reached number 42 on the UK Singles Chart. While well received by critics, it was the first domestically-released U2 single not to make the UK Top 40 since "A Celebration" in 1982. It did, however, reach number one on the Scottish Singles Chart, their second single from No Line on the Horizon to do so.

== Writing and recording ==
"Magnificent" originated from the band's improvised recording sessions with Brian Eno and Daniel Lanois in Fez, Morocco in June 2007. The track was created out of a series of chord changes in the midst of a jam. The Edge noted that "The basic chord progression had a power that got everyone inspired. I think we all knew that it was inherently joyful, which is rare." A group of Moroccan percussionists played along with the band, and the result quickly became a band favourite during the sessions.

Bono noted that the lyrics were influenced by both Cole Porter and Bach, as well as the 'Magnificat', a passage from the Gospel of Luke that was previously set to music by Bach. Lanois described the song's origins: "We wanted to have something euphoric and Bono came up with that little melody. And he loved that melody, and stuck with it. Almost like a fanfare. And then I was involved in the lyrical process on that, because we wanted to talk about sacrifice that one makes for one's medium or one's art. I thought it had for a setting New York in the 1950s; looking out a small bedroom window. Maybe a Charlie Parker kind of figure."

=== Remixes ===
The song has been remixed numerous times, including versions by Dave Audé, Pete Tong, Redanka, Fred Falke, and Adam K & Soha. The remixes were made available simultaneously with the single release for the song. In the UK the Magnificent Remixes were the highest climber in the Upfront Club Chart at No. 3, and are at No. 4 in the Cool Cuts Chart. will.i.am participated in the creation of an as-yet unreleased remix.

The synthesized baseline of Redanka's 180 Version Remix is similar to Donna Summer's 1977 hit song "I Feel Love".

The radio edit and UK edit are slightly different versions of the song, with the most prominent difference being an alteration in the first lyric.

== Music video ==
The music video was filmed in Fez, Morocco. It was directed by Alex Courtes, who previously worked with the band on the video for "Get On Your Boots". The video premiered online via Yahoo! Music on May 6, 2009.

== Reception ==
Upon the release of No Line on the Horizon, many critics called "Magnificent" one of the album's highlights. Q wrote that it "echoes The Unforgettable Fire's opening track "A Sort of Homecoming" in its atmospheric sweep", also labelling it as a "slow-building anthem with the ambience of "The Unforgettable Fire' and a re-boot of 'Who's Gonna Ride Your Wild Horses.'" In Allmusic's review of the album, Stephen Thomas Erlewine said that on "Magnificent", U2 "strike that unmistakable blend of soaring, widescreen sonics and unflinching openhearted emotion that's been their trademark, turning the intimate into something hauntingly universal". Mojo praised the song, noting the song's "martial snare drums ratchet the Edge's vertiginous delayed guitar figures across a rock landscape that this band realised to near perfection c. The Unforgettable Fire and which they've now updated with no loss of awe". Blender called the song a "rocker" and "yet another hymn to the powers of love" in which the band "achieve liftoff". NME was critical of the song, calling it "astonishingly uninteresting", adding that it "sounds like [it was] reconstituted from the ...Atomic Bomb sessions".

"Magnificent" debuted at number 42 on the UK Singles Chart, becoming U2's first domestically-released single to completely miss the UK Top 40 since 1982's "A Celebration" peaked at number 47 (The import-only "In God's Country" charted in 1988, but missed the top 40). In Scotland, the song debuted at number one Scottish Singles Chart, becoming the second single from No Line on the Horizon to top that chart, after "Get On Your Boots", as well as becoming the band's eight number one overall. It was added to A-Lists of BBC Radio 1 and BBC Radio 2, along with being added to XFM's playlist and the B-List of BBC 6 Music.

The song also made a one-week appearance on the Billboard Hot 100 upon No Line on the Horizon's release, peaking at number 79. Coincidentally, the same week saw Rick Ross chart with a song called "Magnificent". These are the only two songs by this name to ever chart on the Billboard Hot 100 in its history.

"Magnificent" did much better in continental Europe, entering the Top 20 in several countries: number six in the Netherlands, number 11 in Italy, number 15 in France, number 16 in Sweden. The song also reached the Top 5 in Ireland.

Coldplay have regularly played the song prior to the band taking the stage at their concerts on the Viva la Vida Tour.

== Live performances ==
"Magnificent" was debuted on the promotional tour for No Line on the Horizon, being played on the BBC Rooftop, on the Late Show with David Letterman, and at a mini-concert at Fordham University taped for Good Morning America. The song then became a regular on the U2 360° Tour, played within a block of new songs to start the shows. The song was included played at all shows in 2009 and 2010, but was left out of some shows in 2011. The song made its Innocence + Experience Tour debut on the tour's second leg during the last of four shows in Amsterdam.

== Formats and track listings ==
7" single (Island / 2701248)
No.	Title	Length
1.	"Magnificent" (UK edit)	4:22
2.	"Breathe" (Live at the Somerville Theatre, Boston, Massachusetts, March 2009)	4:45
Total length:		9:17

CD single (Island / 2701247 & 2701245)
No.	Title	Length
1.	"Magnificent" (UK edit)	4:21
2.	"Breathe" (Live at the Somerville Theatre, Boston, Massachusetts, March 2009)	4:45
Total length:		9:16

CD single (Island / 2701249)
No.	Title	Length
1.	"Magnificent" (UK edit)	4:21
2.	"Vertigo" (Live at the Somerville Theatre, Boston, Massachusetts, March 2009)	3:48
3.	"Get On Your Boots" (Justice remix)	3:26
4.	"Magnificent" (Video with Weblink)	4:34
Total length:		11:35

Interscope / 1308122
No.	Title	Length
1.	"Magnificent" (UK edit)	4:21
2.	"Magnificent" (Dave Audé Club remix)	7:34
3.	"Magnificent" (Dave Audé Club Dub remix)	7:47
4.	"Magnificent" (Fred Falke full club mix)	7:20
5.	"Magnificent" (Adam K and Soha club mix)	6:15
6.	"Magnificent" (Adam K and Soha dub mix)	6:15
7.	"Magnificent" (Wonderland remix)	9:55
8.	"Magnificent" (Wonderland dub remix)	6:52
9.	"Magnificent" (Redanka's 360 version)	7:23
10.	"Magnificent" (Redanka's 180 version)	8:19
Total length:		72:01

Island / INTR-12571-2
No.	Title	Length
1.	"Magnificent" (UK edit)	4:21
Total length:		4:21

iTunes UK / 2 Remixes
No.	Title	Length
1.	"Magnificent" (UK edit)	4:22
2.	"Magnificent" (Fred Falke full club mix)	7:20
3.	"Get On Your Boots" (Justice remix)	3:26
Total length:		9:17

iTunes UK / 3 Remixes
No.	Title	Length
1.	"Magnificent" (UK edit)	4:22
2.	"Magnificent" (Wonderland remix)	9:54
3.	"Magnificent" (Redanka's 360 version)	7:23
4.	"Magnificent" (Adam K and Soha mix)	6:14
Total length:		27:53

iTunes US & CAN / Magnificent Remixes
No.	Title	Length
1.	"Magnificent" (Dave Audé club remix)	7:33
2.	"Magnificent" (Fred Falke full club mix)	7:20
3.	"Magnificent" (Adam K and Soha mix)	6:14
4.	"Magnificent" (Wonderland remix)	9:54
5.	"Magnificent" (Redanka's 360 version)	7:23
Total length:		38:24

Masterbeat digital release
No.	Title	Length
1.	"Magnificent" (Dave Audé club remix)	7:33
2.	"Magnificent" (Dave Audé club dub remix)	7:46
3.	"Magnificent" (Dave Audé instrumental)	7:29
4.	"Magnificent" (Fred Falke full club mix)	7:19
5.	"Magnificent" (Fred Falke instrumental)	7:19
6.	"Magnificent" (Fred Falke radio mix)	3:58
7.	"Magnificent" (Adam K and Soha club mix)	6:14
8.	"Magnificent" (Adam K and Soha dub mix)	6:14
9.	"Magnificent" (Adam K and Soha radio mix)	4:11
10.	"Magnificent" (Wonderland remix)	9:54
11.	"Magnificent" (Wonderland dub)	6:51
12.	"Magnificent" (Redanka's 360 version)	7:23
13.	"Magnificent" (Redanka's 180 version)	8:18
14.	"Magnificent" (Video download)	4:34
Total length:		95:30

== Charts ==
=== Weekly charts ===
Chart (2009)	Peak position
Austria (Ö3 Austria Top 40)	51
Belgium (Ultratop 50 Flanders)	27
Belgium (Ultratop 50 Wallonia)	14
Canada Hot 100 (Billboard)	68
Canada (Nielsen SoundScan)	5
Czech Republic Airplay (ČNS IFPI)	23
France (SNEP)	15
Germany (GfK)	25
Ireland (IRMA)	5
Italy (FIMI)	11
Netherlands (Dutch Top 40)	18
Netherlands (Single Top 100)	6
Scotland Singles (OCC)	1
Slovakia Airplay (ČNS IFPI)	17
Spain (Promusicae)	41
Sweden (Sverigetopplistan)	16
Switzerland (Schweizer Hitparade)	45
UK Singles (OCC)	42
US Billboard Hot 100	79
US Adult Alternative Airplay (Billboard)	2
US Alternative Airplay (Billboard)	18
US Adult Pop Airplay (Billboard)	23
US Dance Club Songs (Billboard)	2
US Dance Singles Sales (Billboard)	2

=== Year-end charts ===
Chart (2009)	Position
Belgium (Ultratop Wallonia)	39
Europe (European Hot 100 Singles)	96
France (SNEP)	85
Italy (FIMI)	57
US Dance Club Songs (Billboard)	37

== Certifications ==
Region	Certification	Certified units/sales
Brazil (Pro-Música Brasil)	Gold	30,000^{‡}
^{‡} Sales+streaming figures based on certification alone.

== See also ==
- List of covers of U2 songs - Magnificent
