= U2 Go Home: Live from Slane Castle, Ireland =

2003 concert film by U2

Video by U2
- Released: 17 November 2003
- Recorded: 1 September 2001
- Venues: Slane Castle (Slane, Ireland)
- Genre: Rock
- Length: 132 minutes
- Labels: Island; Interscope
- Director: Hamish Hamilton
- Producer: Ned O'Hanlon

U2 chronology
The Best of 1990–2000 (2002)	U2 Go Home: Live from Slane Castle, Ireland (2003)	How to Dismantle an Atomic Bomb (2004)

U2 Go Home: Live from Slane Castle, Ireland is a concert film by Irish rock band U2. It was filmed on 1 September 2001 at Slane Castle in County Meath, Ireland, during the European leg of the group's Elevation Tour. The video was released on DVD in November 2003. Although Slane Concerts at the castle are traditionally held once a year, U2 played two concerts; the second one was filmed for the video, and was the band's final show on the European leg of the tour. U2 Go Home was the second of two concert videos from the tour, preceded by 2001's Elevation 2001: Live from Boston.

== Background ==
The Elevation Tour was a worldwide concert tour by the Irish rock band U2, launched in support of the group's 2000 album All That You Can't Leave Behind. The tour was designed by Willie Williams and Mark Fisher, designers of a number of U2's tours.

The key feature was the stage, which included a large heart-shaped ramp which jutted halfway out onto the arena floor, creating a glorified catwalk. Some general admission ticket-holders were placed inside the heart, on which band members could walk, getting closer to the audience on both sides. Visual images were presented on scrims mounted high among the lighting rigs, sometimes in dynamic swirling fashion such as for "Kite", and even on the entire indoor surface.

Williams would win Live Design magazine's 2001 EDDY Award for his work on the tour; the award stated, "While U2's current Elevation tour is striking in its simplicity, Williams created an almost complete amalgamation of lighting and video by using the entire space of each arena as a projection surface."

== Filming ==
"It was twenty years since we'd played Slane. And it was thrilling to go back to our home town and play to that many people. But Bob's funeral really felt like the end of an era and it took the edge off a huge occasion. The second show, a week later, was completely different."

— Drummer Larry Mullen Jr., on U2 playing at Slane Castle

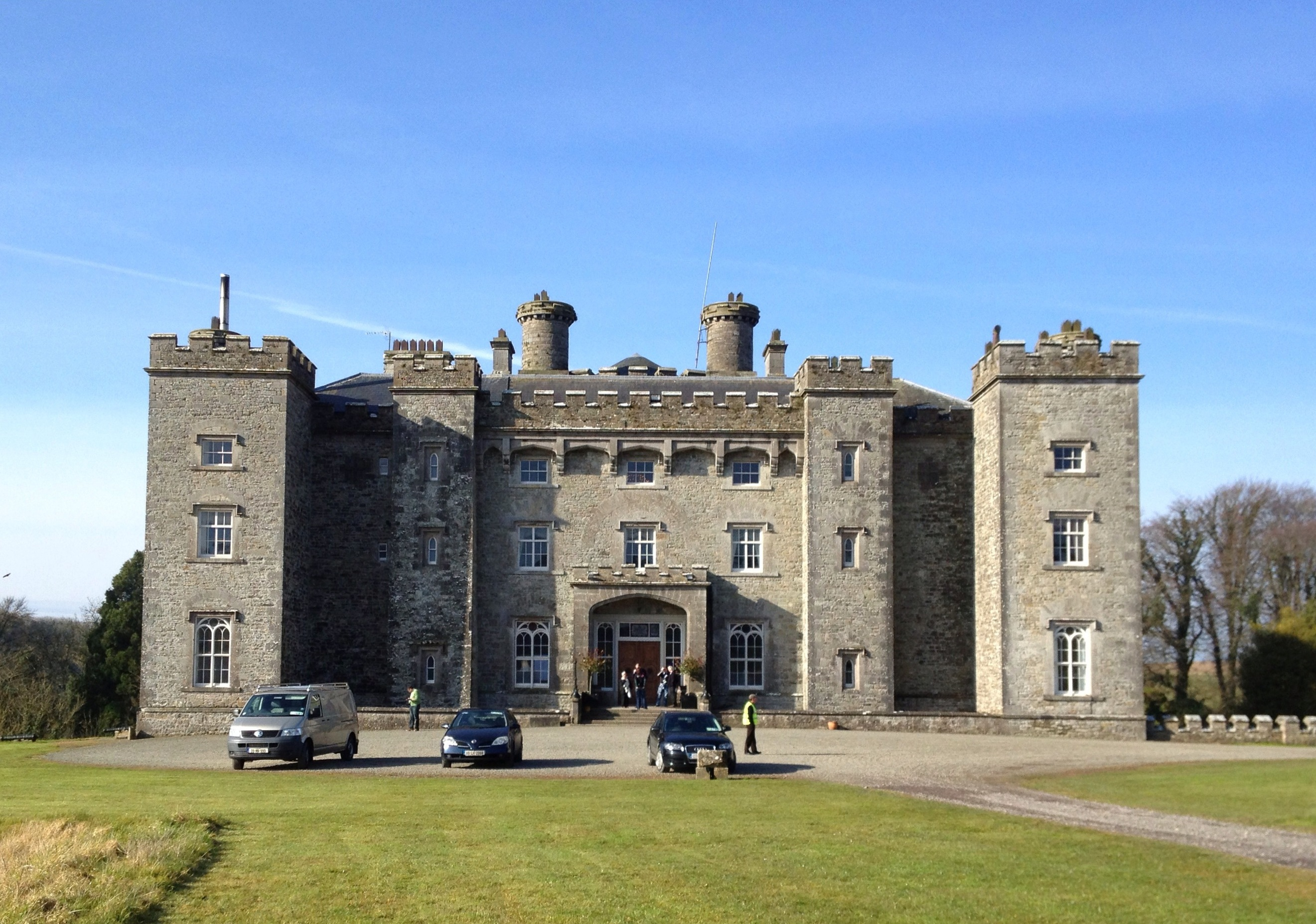
Slane Clastle, the site of the concert depicted in U2 Go Home

The film features the second of two concerts played by U2 at Slane Castle on the Elevation Tour. The performances, which attracted crowds of 80,000 each, were the band's first at Slane since 1981, when they opened for Thin Lizzy. Bob Hewson, the father of lead singer Paul "Bono" Hewson, died of cancer several days before the first concert.

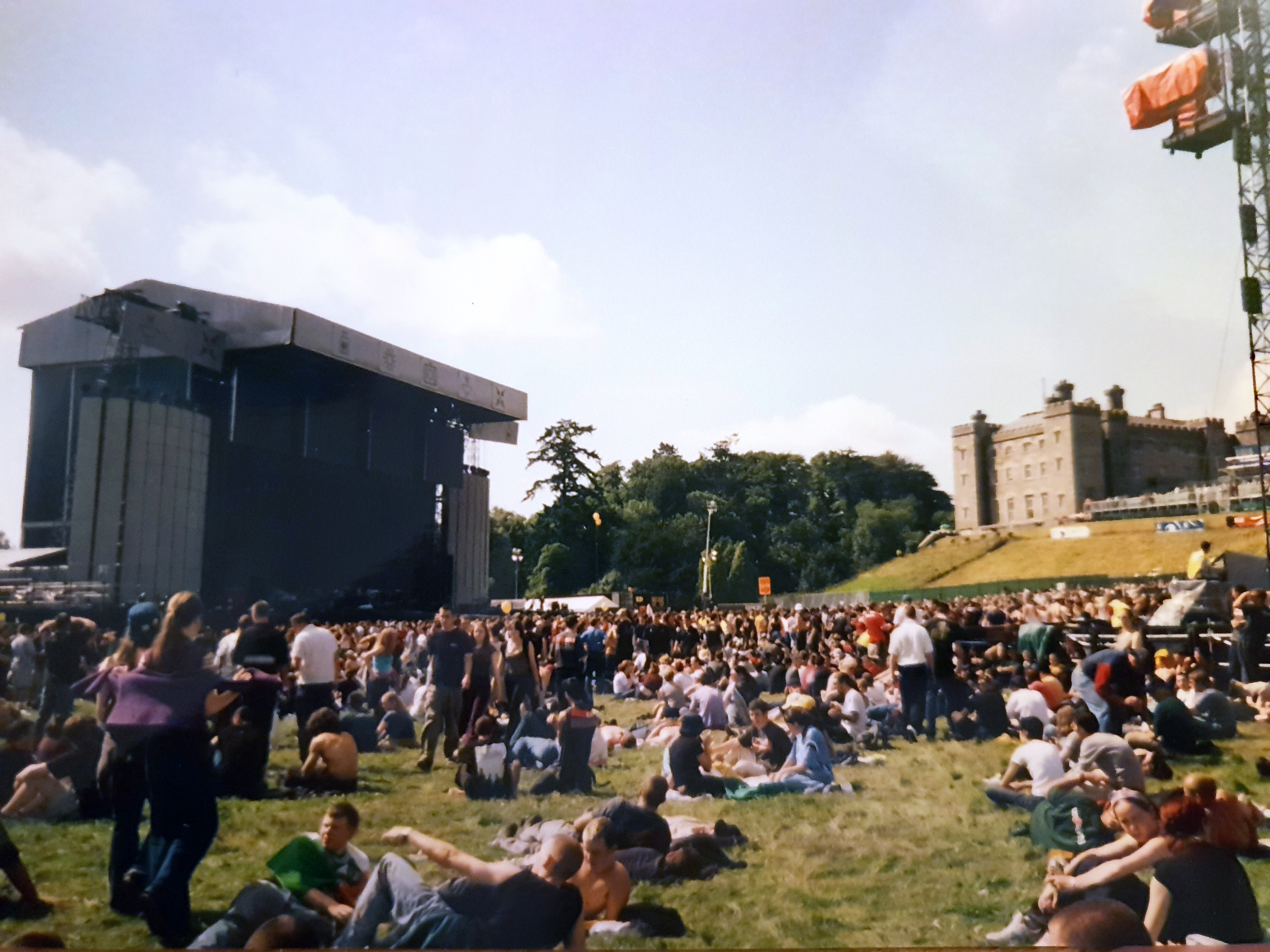
The stage before the first U2 Slane Concert in 2001

U2's first night at Slane was on 25 August, a day after Bono's father was buried. He dedicated the song "Kite" to his father. U2 Go Home was filmed on Saturday, 1 September 2001, the same day the Republic of Ireland beat the Netherlands to secure a place in the 2002 FIFA World Cup Intercontinental Play-off where Ireland would go on to defeat Iran. The match was shown to the crowd at Slane Castle prior to the concert, adding to the already festive air. During the bridge in "New Year's Day", Bono drapes himself in the Irish flag and tells the crowd "close your eyes and imagine, it's Jason McAteer", who scored the decisive goal during the match.

== Release ==
U2 Go Home was announced on 17 September 2003. The day before its 18 November release in North America, the VH1 Classic television channel broadcast excerpts of the concert as part of its Classic in Concert programme.

The DVD includes a remastered version of a 28-minute documentary that chronicled the making of the band's 1984 album The Unforgettable Fire, part of which was recorded in Slane Castle. A "Spincam" bonus feature was included, allowing variable-angle viewing of performances of "Where the Streets Have No Name", "Elevation", and "Beautiful Day". A performance of the song "Mysterious Ways", which was omitted from the video's running order, was included as a bonus track. It features Bono dancing on stage with his daughter Eve. Other bonus features included DVD ROM content such as a U2 calendar, screensavers, and web links. The DVD features the concert in the PCM Stereo, Dolby Digital 5.1, and DTS 5.1 audio formats.

The liner notes to U2 Go Home feature two photographs by Jim Rinaldi, a U2 fan who worked primarily in the heating and air conditioning business. After he sent the photos to the U2 fansite atu2.com, they were posted online and caught the attention of the band. Rinaldi allowed the group to use his photos in the DVD packaging, and was compensated with 12 copies of the video and a four-figure payment.

U2 Go Home was one of the world's highest-selling music DVDs of 2003.

On 15 March 2021, U2 announced a concert broadcast series called "The Virtual Road" in partnership with YouTube, by which four of the group's past concert films were remastered and streamed on the band's official YouTube channel for 48 hours each. The series began with U2 Go Home on 17 March (St. Patrick's Day), with a pre-recorded performance by Irish musician Dermot Kennedy serving as an "opening act". To coincide with the broadcast event, a four-track EP of songs from U2 Go Home was released to streaming services and digital stores.

== Reception ==
Professional ratings
Review scores
Source	Rating
AllMusic	4/5 stars
The Arizona Republic	4/5 stars
Entertainment Weekly	B+
Philadelphia Daily News	B+
PopMatters	very favourable
Rolling Stone	4/4 stars
The Salt Lake Tribune	A
Santa Cruz Sentinel	A

U2 Go Home received positive reviews from critics. Chuck Myers of Knight Ridder said, "Few bands can turn a large gathering into an intimate affair like U2, particularly when it's on home turf". Myers praised the group's performance and the cinematography, saying that the video "has a more visceral, less sanitized quality" than the Elevation 2001: Live from Boston video filmed earlier on the Elevation Tour. Michael Beaumont of PopMatters said, "While the show could have easily seemed superfluous, it is in actuality the definitive document of not only the Elevation tour, but arguably of U2 live, period." He praised the "loose, carefree, freewheeling atmosphere" that permeated the performance and Hamish Hamilton's direction. He concluded by calling it "quite simply the best live U2 performance put to DVD or video". Christian Hoard of Rolling Stone said that the "joyous vibe" of the band's album All That You Can't Leave Behind was evident throughout the performance, and that "Aside from stripped-down versions of 'Desire"' and 'Staring at the Sun,' U2 present the songs in all their arena-rocking glory." Christopher Gray of The Austin Chronicle said that the video "captures the Best Band Ever in peak Elevation tour form, spurred on by 80,000 rabid countrymen." He said that "Bono's in his element" and that "The Edge, Adam, and Larry rip through the set like they're still in Mr. Hewson's living room."

Chris Willman of Entertainment Weekly said that U2 Go Home "might impress more" if not for the band's earlier Elevation 2001 DVD with which there were about a dozen shared songs, but said "the show is as spectacular as it is repetitious, and that castle makes a nice, Red Rocks-ian backdrop". Tracy Collins of The Arizona Republic called it "a solid investment for the U2 fan", calling Bono's recollection during "Out of Control" of the band members asking their parents for 500 pounds each a "key moment". Robert Hilburn of the Los Angeles Times singled out the group and their fans for being "supercharged emotionally", saying, "Seeing U2 before a home-town crowd in Dublin must be a lot like seeing Springsteen at the Meadowlands in New Jersey". Dan Nailen of The Salt Lake Tribune praised the group's performance, the audio quality, and the camera work that captured "one of the biggest acts in the world at a creative zenith". Ron Rollins of the Santa Cruz Sentinel said, "Creatively shot, tightly edited, the DVD pulls in the crowd as an important element of the show".

== Track listing ==
1. "Elevation"
2. "Beautiful Day"
3. "Until the End of the World"
4. "New Year's Day"
5. "Out of Control"
6. "Sunday Bloody Sunday"
7. "Wake Up Dead Man"
8. "Stuck in a Moment You Can't Get Out Of"
9. "Kite"
10. "Angel of Harlem"
11. "Desire"
12. "Staring at the Sun"
13. "All I Want Is You"
14. "Where the Streets Have No Name"
15. "Pride (In the Name of Love)"
16. "Bullet the Blue Sky"
17. "With or Without You"
18. "One"
19. "Walk On"

Bonus tracks

1. "Mysterious Ways"
2. The Making of The Unforgettable Fire

== Personnel ==
U2

- Bono – lead vocals, guitars, harmonica
- The Edge – guitars, keyboards, backing vocals
- Adam Clayton – bass guitar
- Larry Mullen Jr. – drums

Production

- Hamish Hamilton – live show director
- Maurice Linanne – concert director
- Enda Hughes – film unit director
- Brian McCue – concert editor
- Ned O'Hanlon – concert producer
- Sarah Layish-Melamed – DVD producer
- Paul McGuinness – executive producer
- Sheila Roche – DVD project director
- Candida Bottaci – DVD project manager
- Tara Mullen – production manager
- Stuart Bailie – liner notes
- Denis Desmond – promotion
- Willie Williams – director of photography, set designer
- Allen Kiely, Jim Rinaldi, Kyran O'Brien, Paul McErlane and Stefan Eschenbach – photography
- Richard Rainey – engineering
- Carl Glanville – additional engineering, editing, mixing
- Peter Cobbin – mastering and mixing (5.1 mix)
- Aiden Foley – mastering (stereo mix)
- Richard Lancaster – mastering/mixing assistant (5.1 mix)

== Charts ==
=== Weekly charts ===
Chart (2003)	Peak position
Austrian Music DVD (Ö3 Austria)	2
German Albums (Offizielle Top 100)	42
Hungarian DVDs (MAHASZ)	13
Ireland Top 20 DVDs	2
Dutch Music DVD (MegaCharts)	1
Spanish Music DVD (Promusicae)	2
Swiss Albums (Schweizer Hitparade)	25
UK Music Videos (Official Charts)	1
US Billboard Top Music Videos	8

Chart (2004)	Peak position
Australian Top 40 Music DVDs	1
Japanese DVDs Chart	49
New Zealand Top 10 Music DVDs	1

Chart (2005)	Peak position
Belgian Music DVD (Ultratop Flanders)	2
Belgian Music DVD (Ultratop Wallonia)	5
Danish Music DVD (Hitlisten)	1
Italian Music DVD (FIMI)	2
Norwegian Top 10 DVDs	1
Portuguese Top 30 Music DVDs	3
Swedish Music DVD (Sverigetopplistan)	2

Chart (2009)	Peak position
French Music DVD (SNEP)	15

=== Year-end charts ===
Chart (2003)	Position
Dutch Music DVD (MegaCharts)	18
Swedish Music DVD (Sverigetopplistan)	25
UK Music DVD (OCC)	8

Chart (2004)	Position
Australian Music DVD (ARIA)	12
Belgian Music DVD (Ultratop Flanders)	10
Belgian Music DVD (Ultratop Wallonia)	25
Dutch Music DVD (MegaCharts)	11
Spanish Music DVD (PROMUSICAE)	6
Swedish Music DVD (Sverigetopplistan)	11

Chart (2005)	Position
Australian Music DVD (ARIA)	11
Belgian Music DVD (Ultratop Flanders)	14
Dutch Music DVD (MegaCharts)	10
Spanish Music DVD (PROMUSICAE)	10
Swedish Music DVD (Sverigetopplistan)	13

Chart (2006)	Position
Australian Music DVD (ARIA)	37
UK Music DVD (OCC)	50

Chart (2009)	Position
Swedish Music DVD (Sverigetopplistan)	25

== Certifications ==
Region	Certification	Certified units/sales
Argentina (CAPIF)	Platinum	8,000^{^}
Australia (ARIA)	7× Platinum	105,000^{^}
Brazil (Pro-Música Brasil)	Diamond	100,000^{*}
Denmark (IFPI Danmark)	2× Platinum	80,000^{^}
France (SNEP)	Gold	10,000^{*}
Mexico (AMPROFON)	Platinum	20,000^{^}
Portugal (AFP)	2× Platinum	16,000^{^}
Spain (Promusicae)	Gold	10,000^{^}
United Kingdom (BPI)	2× Platinum	100,000^{^}
^{*} Sales figures based on certification alone.^{^} Shipments figures based on certification alone.
