= Elevation 2001: Live from Boston =

2001 concert video by U2

Video by U2
- Released: 20 November 2001
- Recorded: 5, 6, 9 June 2001
- Venues: FleetCenter (Boston, Massachusetts)
- Genre: Rock
- Length: 107:58
- Labels: Island; Interscope
- Director: Hamish Hamilton
- Producer: Ned O'Hanlon

U2 chronology
All That You Can't Leave Behind (2000)	Elevation 2001: Live from Boston (2001)	7 (2002)

Elevation 2001: Live from Boston is a concert film by Irish rock band U2. It was filmed on 5–6 and 9 June 2001 at the FleetCenter in Boston, Massachusetts, during the first American leg of the group's Elevation Tour. The video was directed by Hamish Hamilton and produced by Ned O'Hanlon. It was released on home video as a two-disc DVD and a single VHS by Island Records and Interscope Records on 20 November 2001. Elevation 2001 was the first of two video releases from the tour, the second being U2 Go Home: Live from Slane Castle, Ireland in 2003.

During the 6 June concert, some fans in the crowd sat down in protest due to a disagreement over others being handpicked from the general admission queue prior to the show. Two songs from the concert were televised that day on NBC during halftime of Game 1 of the 2001 NBA Finals. For the concert's release on home video later that year, a promotional agreement was reached with media partners consisting of DirecTV, VH1, Clear Channel Communications, and Best Buy, who agreed to commit US$10 million to market the video. Best Buy was given a two-week exclusivity window in which to sell the video in North America, before its wide release on 4 December. Many retailers reacted negatively to the exclusivity agreement, believing it would affect their own sales.

Elevation 2001 received favourable reviews from critics. It received multi-platinum certifications in Canada, France, Australia, the United States, and the United Kingdom. The video sold 700,000 copies by the beginning of 2002 and won the award for Best Music Release DVD at the 5th Annual DVD Entertainment Conference and Showcase. The first disc of the DVD set contains the standard concert footage, while the second disc contains alternate video feeds from a small camera in lead vocalist Bono's trademark glasses, among other bonus features.

== Background ==
Elevation 2001: Live From Boston captures the band's return to performing to indoor venues, making for a more intimate experience. The band had played mostly large outdoor stadiums over the previous decade on their Zoo TV and PopMart Tours.

U2 started their 2001 Elevation Tour on 24 March at the National Car Rental Center in Fort Lauderdale, Florida with the final concert held at the American Airlines Arena in Miami on 2 December. The tour was divided into three legs, two in North America and one in Europe, and also included two concerts at Slane Castle—one of which was documented and released on U2 Go Home: Live from Slane Castle, Ireland.

== Production ==
The concerts were directed by Hamish Hamilton and produced by Ned O'Hanlon. It was the third U2 concert video O'Hanlon had been involved in producing; his company with Maurice Linnane, Dreamchaser Productions, previously produced Zoo TV: Live from Sydney (released in 1994) and PopMart: Live from Mexico City (released in 1998). Drawing from their past experience filming the band, O'Hanlon knew that two shoots would be required to adequately capture their show. He said, "You don't often get two bites at the cherry when you shoot these things because it is very expensive." The 5 June show served as a dress rehearsal for the production crew before the official filming the following night. As the "Making of" featurette on the DVD reveals, the dry run was deemed not up to everyone's standards.

Prior to the 6 June show, security staff at the FleetCenter handpicked some fans from the general admission queue to let them into the venue early, ahead of some people who had been queuing for more than 24 hours. According to lead vocalist Bono, this was done partly to ensure local Bostonians were in the center of the heart-shaped stage but also to ensure a "fresh audience"; he said that many fans had been following the band from concert to concert during the tour and showing up at the front of the audience, which he found "a little disorienting". The decision displeased many in the general admission line, who thought that fans had been specially selected from the line for prime positioning on camera because they were deemed more telegenic. Consequently, about 50 people staged a protest during the concert inside the heart-shaped stage, turning their backs to the band members and sitting down; their actions were visible on the home video release.

Earlier in the day before the group's 6 June concert, Bono spoke to the graduating class at Harvard University and received an honorary degree.

Two "Easter Eggs" are also included on the DVD, these are the Bono Cam views of "Until the End of the World" and "Elevation" from 9 June 2001 in Boston. In fact the whole DVD/VHS although labelled as being from 6 June, is actually mixed footage from 5 and 6 June, with additional Bono cam footage from 9 June.

After U2's performance was filmed in Boston for the video release, producer Steve Lillywhite and engineer John Harris (of Effanel Music) created stereo and 5.1 surround sound mixes of the concert. The band could not be physically present to give feedback, as they were still on tour, so guitarist the Edge collaborated remotely with Lillywhite and Harris on the mixes. Using technology provided by Rocket Network, the Edge used an interface at Abbey Road Studios to access the mixes on secure servers and make edits in Pro Tools, which were then shared with Lillywhite and Harris.

== Release and promotion ==
Part of U2's 6 June concert in Boston was televised that day on NBC during halftime of Game 1 of the 2001 NBA Finals; the network aired a live performance of "Where the Streets Have No Name", followed by a pre-recorded performance of "Elevation" from earlier.

The video was released on a two-disc DVD set for a list price of US$32.98 and on VHS for US$19.98. In North America, Interscope Records agreed to give retailer Best Buy a two-week exclusivity window in which to sell the video starting 20 November 2001, before offering it to other retailers on 4 December. Sources told Billboard that the promotion was proposed to the band by a consortium of media partners consisting of DirecTV, VH1, Clear Channel Communications, and Best Buy, who agreed to commit US$10 million to market the video. The deal as originally proposed would have given Best Buy the exclusive rights to sell the video, but Interscope was concerned with how other retailers would react and negotiated a reduced exclusivity. The concert was televised on VH1 on 24 November and on DirecTV on 2 December. Several radio stations in Boston, including WBCN-FM (104.1), WBMX-FM (98.5), WBOS-FM (92.9), and WZLX-FM (100.7), broadcast the concert to coincide with its November airing on VH1.

Many retailers reacted negatively to the two-week exclusivity given to Best Buy. Glen Ward, the president of North American operations for Virgin Entertainment Group, said Interscope was acting irresponsibly, stating, "They should be helping us to stimulate the consumer, instead of restricting our business and kowtowing to creamers". Ward said his chain would not sell Elevation 2001 and would not feature the band's most recent album All That You Can't Leave Behind in any price-and-position promotions. Smaller merchants said they were considering collaborating with each other to send a unified statement against the video. Many of them feared that the promotion would usher in a trend of large retail chains demanding similar promotions, which would hurt the business of independent stores. One retailer said, "I always thought [U2] were about helping the little guy and promoting world peace and things like that, but it turns out they are just another corporate sellout [that] doesn't care who they hurt in making money."

== Reception ==
Professional ratings
Review scores
Source	Rating
The Advertiser	4/4 stars
AllMovie	3.5/5 stars
The Arizona Republic	Above Average
Calgary Herald	4/4 stars
Edmonton Journal	4/5 stars
Rocky Mountain News	A

Elevation 2001: Live from Boston received generally favourable reviews. Nick Lewis of the Calgary Herald praised the DVD, saying, "The set is crisp, the song selection is on, and the fans are just screamy enough." He added, "though it's far from the best [U2 concert video], Elevation is as good as we've come to expect." Paul Connolly of The Times said, "as this recording exhibits, Bono and the boys are back to doing what they do best", calling their set "simple and gorgeous". He concluded, "the real treasure is the concert footage. Sublime." Curtis Ross of The Tampa Tribune said the video "sets a new standard for concerts DVDs" and that the band "eschew the pomp and circumstance of previous tours in favor of a direct and emotionally charged approach". Raoul Hernandez of The Austin Chronicle praised the film, singling out "Kite" and "Stuck in a Moment You Can't Get Out Of" among the new songs that "ofttimes surpass[ed] old favorites throughout the disc". He also called "I Will Follow" and the "orgiastic end-run" of "Bad", "Where the Streets Have No Name", and "Bullet the Blue Sky" highlights of the concert. Hernandez thought the DVD medium made Elevation 2001 just as effective as a live audio album as it was a visual experience. Ben Wener of the Orange County Register called it a "two-disc dazzler befitting the biggest tour of the year" and a pinnacle for the band. The review said of the concert: "the pacing is driving, not sluggish; the between-song banter comes across genuinely; and the song selection is an ideal mix of unavoidables and lesser-knowns."

Sandra Sperounes of the Edmonton Journal said that compared to the band's previous concert film PopMart: Live from Mexico City, the Elevation 2001 DVD "captures a warmth and intimacy not usually found in sports arenas" and that it was "the next best thing to seeing the Irishmen live". She praised Hamilton's direction, saying it exhibited an "art-house flair absent from most TV concerts" and "opt[ed] to go for out-of-focus shots, weird band/fan juxtapositions and grainy, dark lighting akin to Anton Corbijn photographs". Howard Cohen of the Miami Herald said that the video, "though lacking the emotional wallop of post-Sept. 11 shows, is dazzling, even when confined to a TV screen". He said, "Freed from the visual effluvia of its '90s tours, Elevation 2001 feels remarkably spontaneous for such a big production and the DVD finds U2 fitting nicely in its unstated role as 'the greatest rock band'". Gerry Krochak of the Leader-Post called the film a "a fan's dream come true" with "simply a set-list to die for", while praising the inclusion of multiple camera angles for giving it a "very in-the-middle-of-the-action feel about it". Théoden K. Janes of The Arizona Republic said the performances were "all directed with precision and energy" and judged the DVD to be a bargain for capturing the concert experience cheaper than the cost of a ticket. The review concluded, "For all those U2 fans who still haven't found what they're looking for, this energetic and comprehensive concert DVD is a sure thing."

During the first week of Best Buy's two-week exclusivity window to distribute Elevation 2001, the video sold 23,000 copies at the retailer. The video sold 700,000 copies by the beginning of 2002.

In August 2002, Elevation 2001 won an award for the Best Music Release DVD during the awards ceremony of the 5th Annual DVD Entertainment Conference and Showcase.

== Track listing ==
All tracks written by U2.

1. "Elevation"
2. "Beautiful Day"
3. "Until the End of the World"
4. "Stuck in a Moment You Can't Get Out Of"
5. "Kite"
6. "Gone"
7. "New York"
8. "I Will Follow"
9. "Sunday Bloody Sunday"
10. "In a Little While"
11. "Desire"
12. "Stay (Faraway, So Close!)"
13. "Bad" / "40" (snippet)
14. "Where the Streets Have No Name"
15. "Bullet the Blue Sky"
16. "With or Without You"
17. "The Fly"
18. "Wake Up Dead Man"
19. "Walk On"

== Bonus features ==
- Disc 1:
  - The Making of the Filming of "Elevation 2001: Live from Boston"
  - Easter egg 1 – click the "Making of the Filming of". Fast forward to the end and look for the Dreamchaser logo in the credits. At the top of the logo, a little Bono head will appear. Click on it as quickly as possible. Next, a screen with flashing cubes will display. Enter the following: "1 enter, 9 enter, 7 enter, 6 enter" while the cubes are flashing to access the special "Bono Cam" feature for the first 4 minutes of "Elevation", the audio of which is straight from Bono's in-ear monitor.
- Disc 2:
  - Another Perspective – Concert with alternative angles: fan cam, director cam
  - Road Movie – Time-lapse footage of a day on the road
  - Additional tracks
    - "Beautiful Day" live from Dublin, September 2000 (Although on the DVD it is listed as "Toronto, Canada")
    - "Elevation" live from Miami, first show souvenir, March 2001
    - "Stuck in a Moment You Can't Get Out Of" live from Hanover, Dublin, and France, July 2000
  - Trailers
    - Zoo TV: Live from Sydney
    - PopMart: Live from Mexico City
  - Easter egg 2 – go to the help menu (the question mark in the bottom left). When in the help menu, enter "1 enter 9 enter 9 enter 1 enter" and "Until the End of the World" will be played from the perspective of the "Bono Cam".

== Best Buy promo CD ==
On Black Friday in 2001, Best Buy distributed a free exclusive promo CD entitled 3 Live Tracks from Boston. It features three songs from the Elevation 2001: Live from Boston DVD. The CD lists all performances as being from the concert on 6 June 2001; however, "Gone" was actually recorded on 5 June.

1. "Beautiful Day" – 4:56
2. "Gone" – 5:05
3. "I Will Follow" – 5:34

== Charts ==
=== Weekly charts ===
Chart (2001)	Peak position
Australian Music DVD (ARIA)	1
Danish Music DVD (Hitlisten)	3
Dutch Music DVD (MegaCharts)	1
Ireland Top 20 DVDs	2
Swedish Music DVD (Sverigetopplistan)	2
UK Music Videos (Official Charts)	4
US Music Videos (Billboard)	1

Chart (2005)	Peak position
Italian Music DVD (FIMI)	13

=== Year-end charts ===
Chart (2002)	Position
Australian Music DVD (ARIA)	8
Swedish Music DVD (Sverigetopplistan)	11

Chart (2003)	Position
Dutch Music DVD (MegaCharts)	42
UK Music DVD (OCC)	94

== Certifications ==
Region	Certification	Certified units/sales
Argentina (CAPIF)	Platinum	8,000^{^}
Australia (ARIA)	2× Platinum	30,000^{^}
Austria (IFPI Austria)	Gold	5,000^{*}
Brazil (Pro-Música Brasil)	Gold	25,000^{*}
Canada (Music Canada)	5× Platinum	50,000^{^}
France (SNEP)	3× Platinum	60,000^{*}
Germany (BVMI)	Gold	25,000^{^}
Mexico (AMPROFON)	Gold	10,000^{^}
United Kingdom (BPI)	2× Platinum	100,000^{^}
United States (RIAA)	2× Platinum	200,000^{^}
^{*} Sales figures based on certification alone.^{^} Shipments figures based on certification alone.
