= 7 (U2 EP) =

EP by U2
- Released: 22 January 2002
- Recorded: 1996–2001
- Genre: Rock
- Length: 31:30
- Label: Interscope

U2 chronology
Elevation 2001: Live from Boston (2001)	7 (2002)	The Best of 1990–2000 (2002)

Professional ratings
Review scores
Source	Rating
AllMusic	2.5/5 stars

7 is an EP by the Irish rock band U2, released exclusively at Target retailers in the United States in 2002. It collects various B-sides from All That You Can't Leave Behind-era singles, which were previously unavailable in the US. The title refers to the number of tracks. Likewise, at the time of its release, 7 was priced at nearly 7 US dollars. The title is also a homage to 3, the group's first release.

== Release ==
7 was released at all 1,055 Target stores in the US on 22 January 2002. Its original retail price was US$6.99.

== Track listing ==
All tracks are written by U2.

No.	Title	Lyrics	Length
1.	"Summer Rain"	Bono; The Edge	4:06
2.	"Always"	Bono	3:46
3.	"Big Girls Are Best"	Bono; The Edge	3:37
4.	"Beautiful Day" (Quincey and Sonance mix)	Bono	7:55
5.	"Elevation" (Influx mix)	Bono	4:02
6.	"Walk On" (single version)	Bono	4:11
7.	"Stuck in a Moment You Can't Get Out Of" (acoustic version)	Bono; The Edge	3:42
Total length:			31:30

Drum track from "Summer Rain" is the same as the drum track from "Walk On". "Always" is an early version of "Beautiful Day". "Big Girls Are Best" was a leftover from the Pop sessions. This Influx mix of "Elevation" was used to open shows on the Elevation Tour. The single version of "Walk On", which was released on the single with the blue cover, was also featured in concerts, while a live version was released on America: A Tribute to Heroes. In 2002 another mix of "Walk On" called the "Hallelujah mix" (for its coda of hallelujahs) was released on a promotional CD.

== Personnel ==
- Bono – lead vocals
- The Edge – guitar, keyboards, vocals
- Adam Clayton – bass guitar
- Larry Mullen Jr. – drums (except "Stuck in a Moment You Can't Get Out Of (Acoustic)")
- Daniel Lanois, Brian Eno – production (on all tracks except "Big Girls Are Best" and "Stuck in a Moment You Can't Get Out Of (Acoustic)")
- Howie B, Flood – production (on "Big Girls Are Best")
- Steve Lillywhite – production (on "Stuck in a Moment You Can't Get Out Of (Acoustic)")
- Nigel Godrich – additional production (on "Walk On")

== See also ==
- U2 discography
