= All That You Can't Leave Behind =

Studio album by U2
- Released: 30 October 2000
- Studios: HQ (Dublin); Windmill Lane (Dublin); Westland (Dublin); Totally Wired (Dublin); South of France
- Genre: Pop rock
- Length: 49:25
- Labels: Island; Interscope
- Producers: Daniel Lanois; Brian Eno

U2 chronology
Hasta la Vista Baby! U2 Live from Mexico City (2000)	All That You Can't Leave Behind (2000)	Elevation 2001: Live from Boston (2001)

Singles from All That You Can't Leave Behind
- 1. "Beautiful Day" Released: 9 October 2000; 2. "Stuck in a Moment You Can't Get Out Of" Released: 29 January 2001; 3. "Elevation" Released: 25 June 2001; 4. "Walk On" Released: 19 November 2001

20th anniversary edition
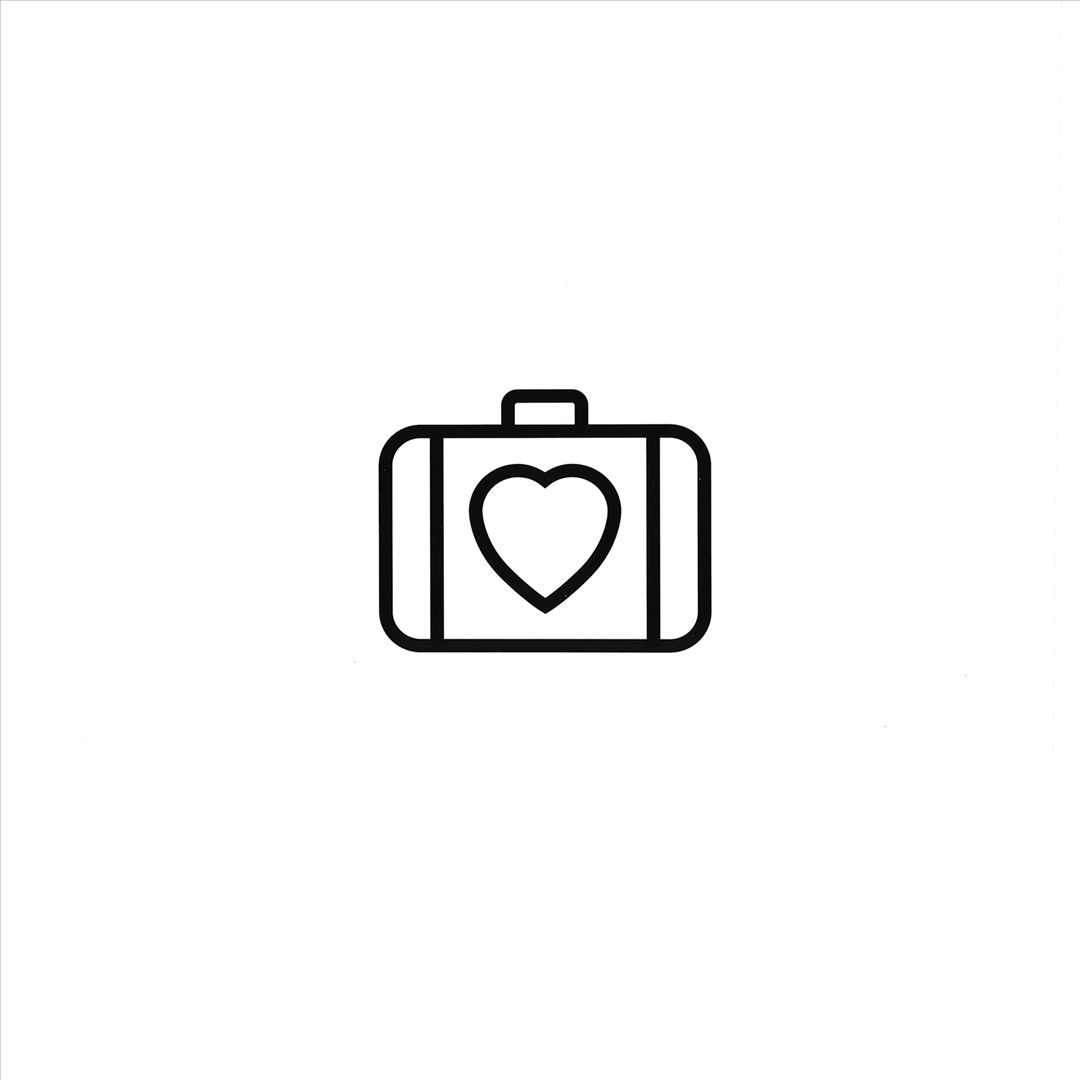
- Icons used in the album imagery were repurposed for the 20th-anniversary box set

All That You Can't Leave Behind is the tenth studio album by Irish rock band U2. It was produced by Brian Eno and Daniel Lanois, and was released on 30 October 2000 through Island Records worldwide and through Interscope Records in the United States. After the band's experimentation with alternative rock and dance music in the 1990s, and driven by the mixed reception to their 1997 album Pop, U2 returned to a sound more akin to their earlier records for All That You Can't Leave Behind. The group reunited with Eno and Lanois, who had produced three prior U2 albums together. The record was originally named U2000, a working title for their PopMart Tour.

The album received mostly positive reviews, reached number one in 32 countries, and sold over 12 million copies. The songs "Beautiful Day", "Walk On", "Elevation", and "Stuck in a Moment You Can't Get Out Of" were all successful singles. The record and its songs won seven Grammy Awards; it is the only album in history to have multiple tracks win the Grammy Award for Record of the Year: "Beautiful Day" at the 2001 ceremony and "Walk On" at the 2002 ceremony. In 2003, the album was ranked 139th on Rolling Stone's list of "The 500 Greatest Albums of All Time" and number 280 in its updated 2012 list. The Elevation Tour, on which U2 returned to playing arenas with a more intimate stage design, was also a critical and commercial success. All That You Can't Leave Behind was reissued in 2020 for its 20th anniversary.

== Background ==
Throughout the 1990s, U2 experimented with alternative rock and electronic dance music, culminating with their 1997 album Pop and the PopMart Tour. Guitarist the Edge said that with Pop, the band had "taken the deconstruction of the rock 'n' roll band format to its absolute 'nth degree". However, following the poor reception to the album and tour, U2 returned to arrangements that consisted almost entirely of guitar, bass, and drums, and quickly regrouped in the studio after the tour.

== Writing and recording ==
For All That You Can't Leave Behind, U2 reunited with producers Brian Eno and Daniel Lanois, who also produced their albums The Unforgettable Fire (1984), The Joshua Tree (1987), and Achtung Baby (1991). Although the band wanted to write new material before beginning recording sessions, Eno convinced them to quickly write songs in the studio. For three weeks in late 1998, U2, Eno, and Lanois recorded demos in Hanover Quay Studios. One of the few quality ideas that stemmed from these brief sessions was the song "Kite". Lead singer Bono's vocals inspired everyone in the studio, particularly after he had been suffering from vocal problems for the previous few years. U2 anticipated that they could complete a new record in time for 1999. After the band's brief demo sessions, the Edge worked alone on song ideas before the band reunited at Hanover Quays. They recorded with the mentality of a "band in a room playing together", an approach that led to the album's more stripped-down sound. After mixing "The Ground Beneath Her Feet" in 2000, Tim Palmer was brought onto the team to mix some key songs for the record. Palmer mixed "Elevation" and "New York" in Dublin, and in Los Angeles he mixed "Stuck in a Moment You Can't Get Out Of".

Bono's involvement in the Jubilee 2000 campaign prevented him from dedicating all of his time to the album's recording, something Eno thought was a distraction. There was also a two-month break in the sessions when Bono collaborated with Lanois and Hal Wilner on The Million Dollar Hotel film soundtrack. The band had thought they could complete the album for 1999, but the sessions ran long, with band members' conflicting schedules playing a large part in the delay. U2 did not want to set a deadline to complete the album after their experience with Pop, which had to be rushed to completion in order to meet the deadline set by their pre-booked PopMart Tour.

In mid-1999, bassist Adam Clayton and drummer Larry Mullen, Jr. bought houses in the South of France, in order to be near Bono and the Edge's homes so they could have a place to both "work and play". That year, a bag holding personal papers and a laptop computer containing lyrics for the album was taken from Bono's car, which was parked outside Dublin's Clarence Hotel, which was owned by Bono and the Edge. Bono offered a reward of £2,000 for the return of the computer. An Irish man returned the laptop after having bought it for £300 thinking it was from a reputable source. He realised who it actually belonged to after seeing Bono's son Elijah Hewson on the screen, prompting him to contact U2's management.

The band have said that All That You Can't Leave Behind was an album that acknowledged the band's past. For example, there was a big debate amongst the band members during the writing and recording of "Beautiful Day"; the Edge was playing with a guitar tone that he had not used much since their 1983 album War and the band wanted something more forward-looking. The Edge won the disagreement, and his preferred guitar tone made it into the final version of the song. Additionally, although the record was described as "a return to the traditional U2 sound", many songs were complex and retained elements of the band's 1990s experimentation; the introduction of "Beautiful Day" features an "electronification of the [chorus] chords with a beat box and a string part"; "New York" came together when the band members were away at a meeting and Lanois and Eno were playing around with a drum loop that Mullen had recorded.

== Composition ==
The album was seen as a return to the band's traditional sound after their more experimental records of the 1990s. In many ways, however, this is an oversimplification, as the album breaks new ground by retaining the sonic nuances of their 1990s work and reconciling it with the melodic, hook-filled rock of their 1980s work. The first song (and lead single), "Beautiful Day", for instance, is an optimistic anthem that opens with a drum machine and a rhythm sequencer. The album also includes "Stuck in a Moment You Can't Get Out Of", a song written by Bono for his friend Michael Hutchence, the lead singer of INXS, who committed suicide in 1997. Clayton said the album was written "about the journey we'd been through as a band, as men in relationships, as sons of mothers and fathers. It was about the baggage that you have to live with, the sense of loss, like the fact that Bono's father was terminally ill through that whole period."

Musicologist Susan Fast says both this album and the follow-up How to Dismantle an Atomic Bomb (2004) find U2 returning to "more 'stripped down' rock and pop sounds". Orlando Sentinel writer Matt Gilmour has called it a "pop-rock" and "classicist rock album – equal parts rhythm and blues, soul, rock and pop".

== Artwork ==
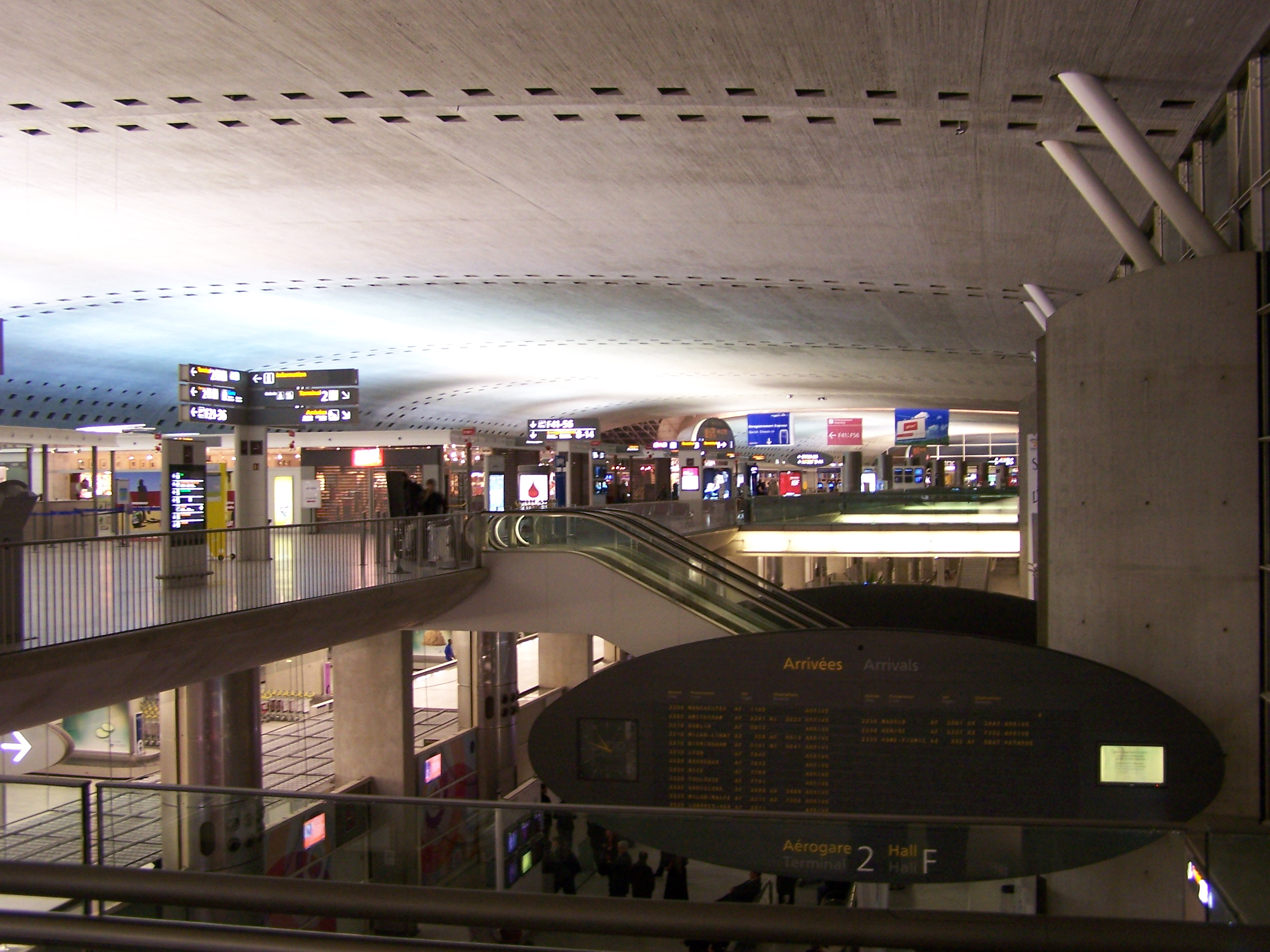
The album cover was photographed in Terminal 2 Hall F of the Charles de Gaulle Airport.

The photograph on the album cover was taken by long-time U2 photographer Anton Corbijn in the Roissy Hall 2F of the Charles de Gaulle Airport in Paris, France, which was also where the music video for "Beautiful Day" was shot. Contrasting with the colourful sleeves of the band's 1990s records, the cover of All That You Can't Leave Behind is a single monochrome image of the band. The designers describe the look they created as "grown up". In the original photograph, an airport sign reads "F21-36", indicating the direction of check-in desks. Per the band's request, the sleeve designers changed this to J33-3, a hidden reference to the Bible verse Jeremiah 33:3 ("Call unto me and I will answer thee great and mighty things which thou knowest not."). Bono referred to it as "God's phone number".

== Release and promotion ==
Following the comparatively poor reception of their previous album Pop, U2 declared on a number of occasions that they were "re-applying for the job ... of best band in the world." Promotional activities for the album included a number of U2 firsts such as appearances on MTV's Total Request Live, USA Network's Farmclub.com, and Saturday Night Live. The band kicked off the release of the album by performing a short concert for about 600 people at the ManRay club in Paris, France, on 19 October 2000, as part of the promotion for the 30 October release of the album. The album was banned in Burma by SPDC because "Walk On" was dedicated to Burmese human rights activist Aung San Suu Kyi.

The album was preceded by the lead single "Beautiful Day", released on 9 October 2000. It was U2's fourth number-one single on the UK Singles Chart, their first number one in the Netherlands, and was also number one for a week in Australia. The song peaked at number 21 on the US Billboard Hot 100. The album's second single, "Stuck in a Moment You Can't Get Out Of", was originally released on 29 January 2001. It was also a success, reaching number two on the UK Singles Chart. In Canada and the United States, the song was released as the album's final single later in the year.

A third single, "Elevation", was first released in Australia on 25 June 2001 and received a UK release on 16 July 2001. The version of the song released as the single was the "Tomb Raider Mix", which appeared in television commercials for the Lara Croft: Tomb Raider movie. It features a much more hard rock arrangement than the album version, and it is this arrangement that the band plays live. The album's fourth and final single, "Walk On", was released in the UK on 19 November 2001. This song served as the album's second single in North America; in Canada, it was released in February 2001, while in the US, it was serviced to radio the following month. The song took on new meaning with listeners following the 11 September attacks.

== Reception ==
=== Critical reaction ===
Professional ratings
Aggregate scores
Source	Rating
Metacritic	79/100
Review scores
Source	Rating
AllMusic	4/5 stars
Chicago Sun-Times	3/4 stars
Entertainment Weekly	A
The Guardian	5/5 stars
NME	7/10
Pitchfork	5.0/10
Q	4/5 stars
Rolling Stone	4/5 stars
USA Today	4/4 stars
The Village Voice	A−

All That You Can't Leave Behind is easy to relate to, full of solid songs that appeal to a wide audience with its clear notions of family, friendship, love, death, and rebirth. ...the sounds on this album come from a band that has digested the music it started to consume while making Rattle and Hum. This time they are neither imitating or paying tribute. This time it's soul music, not music about soul.

— Caroline van Oosten de Boer

All That You Can't Leave Behind received generally positive reviews from critics. On Metacritic, which assigns a normalised rating out of 100 to reviews from mainstream critics, the album has an average score of 79, based on 17 reviews, indicating "generally favourable reviews". James Hunter of Rolling Stone declared it "U2's third masterpiece", alongside The Joshua Tree and Achtung Baby. David Browne of Entertainment Weekly called the record "as unwaveringly assured as Pop was tentative" and said that it "focuses on songs, not sonic gimmicks, and the difference is palpable". He concluded his review thusly: "at a time when rock feels so earthbound, and dance-steeped albums like Moby's Play provide the musical exaltation guitar bands once did, U2 simply want to reclaim some of that old stomping ground. In their hands, falling back on old habits isn't cowardice, but a virtue." Steve Morse of The Boston Globe said the record "has great songs that tie together beautifully—a welcome change from the disjointed nature of U2 discs such as 1993's Zooropa and 1997's Pop". He believed that Bono took extra care in crafting the lyrics, resulting in the "most thoughtful, personal, and tender U2 songs in memory". In his review for The Village Voice, Robert Christgau felt that the album eschewed the artsier tendencies of U2's previous work in favor of hooky pop songs and stated, "The feat's offhandedness is its most salient charm and nagging limitation. If I know anything, which with this band I never have, their best."

AllMusic editor Stephen Thomas Erlewine noted U2's return to "the generous spirit that flowed through their best '80s records" and called All That You Can't Leave Behind "a clever and craftsmanlike record, filled with nifty twists in the arrangements, small sonic details, and colors". USA Today's Edna Gundersen wrote that the band had distilled their previous experimentation "into smart accents and muted afterthoughts", resulting in a more organic record driven by "simplicity and soul". The Guardian's Adam Sweeting felt that they had "grasped the value of simplicity" and created their most accessible and emotional recording since Achtung Baby. While remarking that the record's streamlined nature rendered it "a teensy bit dull", April Long of NME nevertheless called All That You Can't Leave Behind "a laudable achievement". Stephen Thompson was less enthusiastic in his review for The A.V. Club and found it inconsistent: "In terms of execution, it splits about 50–50 between soaring hits and dispiriting misses."

Reviewing the 20th anniversary re-release, Stephen Deusner of Uncut gave the album seven out of 10, noting that the material falters in the last third; he gave the new material a six out of 10, calling the B-sides "dull" but praising the live tracks. The updated review from AllMusic notes that the remasters are the "centrepiece" of the re-release and that hardcore fans will appreciate the weirder collected B-sides; additionally, the packaging and photography from Corbijn are selling points.

=== Commercial performance ===
The album debuted at number three on the Billboard 200 chart in the US, selling 427,826 copies in its first week. The album debuted at number one in 32 countries, including Canada where first-week sales totaled 71,470 copies. According to Nielsen SoundScan, the album has sold 4.4 million copies in the US through March 2014. All That You Can't Leave Behind is the fourth-highest-selling U2 album, with total sales of over 12 million.

=== Accolades ===
At the end of 2000, All That You Can't Leave Behind was voted the seventh-best album of the year in the Pazz & Jop annual critics poll published by The Village Voice. "Beautiful Day" finished fourth in the singles voting. Spin ranked it the 20th-best album of the year. The album and its singles earned U2 seven Grammy Awards over the course of two years. At the 43rd Annual Grammy Awards in 2001, "Beautiful Day" won Song of the Year, Best Rock Performance by a Duo or Group with Vocal, and Record of the Year. In the 44th Annual Grammy Awards in 2002, "Walk On" won Record of the Year, "Elevation" won Best Rock Performance by a Duo or Group with Vocal, and "Stuck in a Moment You Can't Get Out Of" won Best Pop Performance by a Duo or Group with Vocal. The album also won Best Rock Album and was nominated for Album of the Year. All That You Can't Leave Behind is the only album ever to have two singles win Record of the Year in two consecutive years.

== Elevation Tour ==
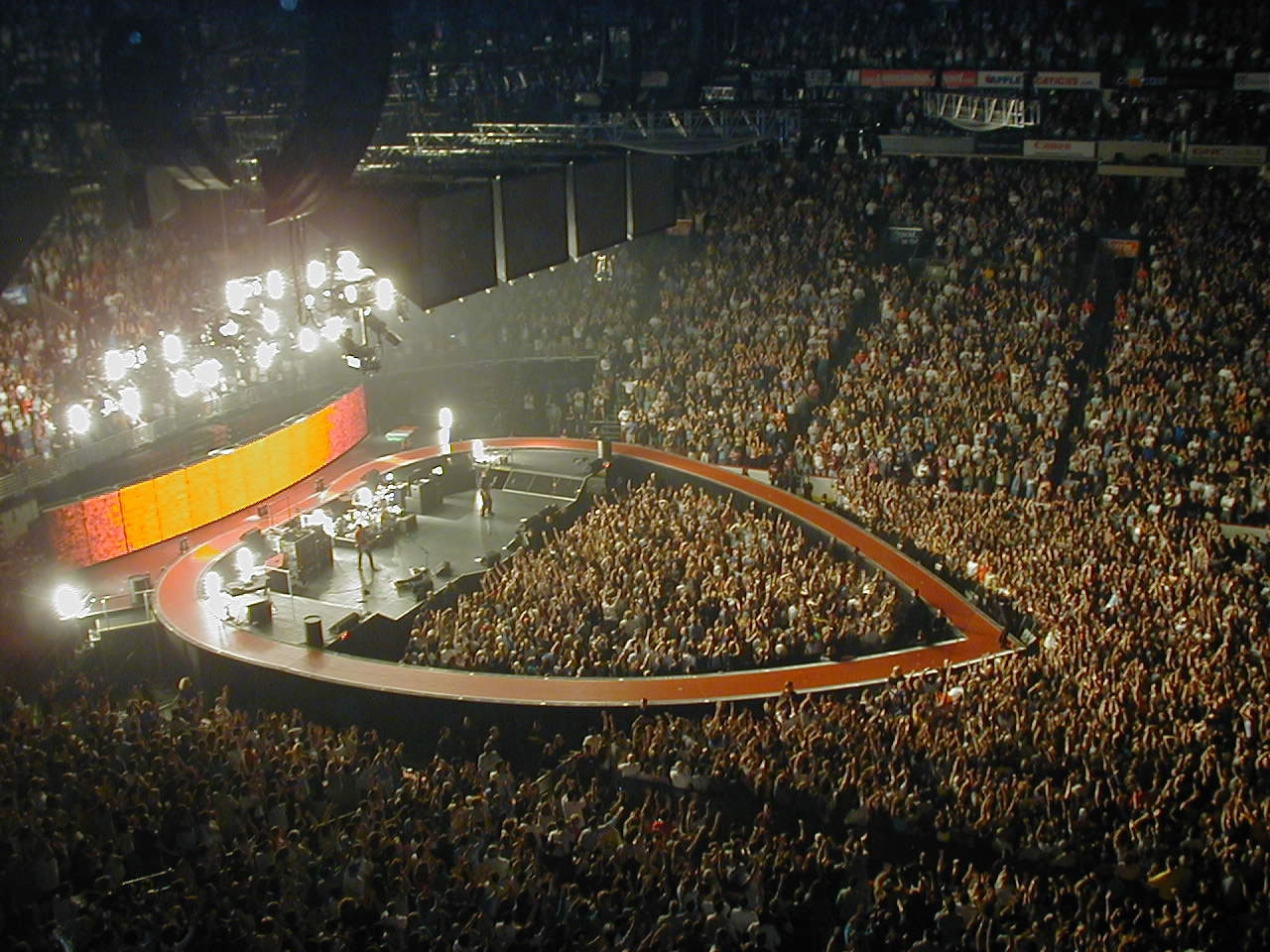
The Elevation Tour stage design was stripped down compared to the elaborate stadium sets on the band's previous two tours. It featured a heart-shaped ramp around the stage.

The accompanying Elevation Tour officially began on 24 March 2001 with a two-night stay at the National Car Rental Center near Fort Lauderdale, Florida, and ended back in Miami, Florida, on 2 December 2001 at the American Airlines Arena. The tour featured three legs and a total of 113 shows. The Elevation Tour saw U2 return to playing indoor arenas after they spent the 1990s in outdoor stadiums. The stage design of the Elevation Tour was more stripped-down and intimate for the fans. Many shows on tour sold out immediately. The band performed multiple concerts in certain cities, including four consecutive shows in Chicago, Boston, and London each. Globally, the Elevation Tour grossed US$143.5 million, making it the year's highest-grossing tour.

== Legacy ==
In 2003, All That You Can't Leave Behind was ranked 139th on Rolling Stone's list of "The 500 Greatest Albums of All Time"; the magazine wrote that U2 "brought things back to essentials" with songs that "grapple with mortality – particularly the gospel-soul ballad 'Stuck in a Moment You Can't Get Out Of' – and take on new resonance after September 11th". In 2012, the album was re-ranked at number 280 on an updated version of the list. In 2009, it was ranked by Rolling Stone as the 13th-best album of the decade, while "Beautiful Day" was rated the ninth-best song. The album was also included in the book 1001 Albums You Must Hear Before You Die. In 2006, Mojo ranked All That You Can't Leave Behind 84th on its list of "The 100 Greatest Albums of Our Lifetime". In 2009, Consequence of Sound ranked the record 62nd on its list of the top 100 albums of the previous decade. In 2014, PopMatters ranked the album 75th on its list of the best albums of the 2000s.

== 20th anniversary edition ==
On 30 October 2020, All That You Can't Leave Behind was reissued on CD, vinyl, and digitally in commemoration of its 20th anniversary. The album was remastered and released in Standard, Deluxe, and Super Deluxe editions, all of which include the song "The Ground Beneath Her Feet", previously a bonus track, in the track listing. The Super Deluxe box set, containing 51 tracks, features: a 32-page book of photography by Anton Corbijn; B-sides and outtakes previously released on 2004's Unreleased & Rare and The Million Dollar Hotel soundtrack; complete audio from June 2001 performances in Boston (taken from the concert video Elevation 2001: Live from Boston); and 11 remixes, four of which were previously unreleased.

== Track listing ==
All lyrics are written by Bono except where noted; all music is composed by U2.

No.	Title	Lyrics	Producer(s)	Length
1.	"Beautiful Day"		Daniel Lanois; Brian Eno; Steve Lillywhite (add.)	4:06
2.	"Stuck in a Moment You Can't Get Out Of"	Bono; The Edge	Lanois; Eno	4:32
3.	"Elevation"		Lanois; Eno	3:45
4.	"Walk On"		Lanois; Eno; Lillywhite (add.)	4:55
5.	"Kite"	Bono; The Edge	Lanois; Eno	4:23
6.	"In a Little While"		Eno; Lanois; Richard Stannard and Julian Gallagher (add.)	3:39
7.	"Wild Honey"		Eno; Lanois	3:47
8.	"Peace on Earth"		Lanois; Eno; Mike Hedges (add.)	4:46
9.	"When I Look at the World"	Bono; The Edge	Eno; Lanois	4:15
10.	"New York"		Eno; Lanois	5:28
11.	"Grace"		Lanois; Eno	5:31
Total length:				49:05

International edition and 20th anniversary reissue
No.	Title	Lyrics	Producer(s)	Length
12.	"The Ground Beneath Her Feet"	Salman Rushdie	Lanois; Eno	3:44
Total length:				52:49

• (add.) Additional production

Notes

- In Japan, Australia, Ireland and the UK, "The Ground Beneath Her Feet" (3:44) is a bonus track at the end.
- Various limited edition copies included a bonus disc with either "Always", "Summer Rain", or "Big Girls are Best". The 7 EP was subsequently released in the US, collecting these B-sides previously unavailable in that region.

20th anniversary reissue – Super Deluxe Edition: B-sides, outtakes, and alternatives (CD disc 2)
No.	Title	Length
1.	"Levitate"	5:10
2.	"Summer Rain"	4:08
3.	"Stateless"	4:07
4.	"Always"	3:49
5.	"Love You Like Mad"	4:19
6.	"Big Girls Are Best"	3:36
7.	"Don't Take Your Guns to Town"	4:14
8.	"Stuck in a Moment You Can't Get Out Of" (Acoustic Version)	3:44
9.	"Flower Child"	4:55
Total length:		38:02

20th anniversary reissue – Super Deluxe Edition: Elevation Live from Boston (CD disc 3)
No.	Title	Length
1.	"Elevation"	5:09
2.	"Beautiful Day"	4:43
3.	"Until the End of the World"	5:15
4.	"Stuck in a Moment You Can't Get Out Of"	5:41
5.	"Kite"	5:25
6.	"Gone"	4:55
7.	"New York"	5:51
8.	"I Will Follow"	5:10
9.	"Sunday Bloody Sunday"	7:24

20th anniversary reissue – Super Deluxe Edition: Elevation Live from Boston (CD disc 4)
No.	Title	Length
1.	"In a Little While"	6:54
2.	"Desire"	3:06
3.	"Stay (Faraway, So Close!)"	4:50
4.	"Bad / 40"	6:23
5.	"Where the Streets Have No Name"	6:31
6.	"Bullet the Blue Sky"	6:19
7.	"With or Without You"	5:31
8.	"The Fly"	7:51
9.	"Wake Up Dead Man"	1:25
10.	"Walk On"	6:38

20th anniversary reissue – Super Deluxe Edition: remixes (CD disc 5)
No.	Title	Length
1.	"Elevation" (Paul Van Dyk Remix)	7:57
2.	"Elevation" (Influx Remix)	4:03
3.	"New York" (Carnegie's Deli Remix)	7:05
4.	"New York" (Superman Kicks Ativan Remix)	7:31
5.	"Beautiful Day" (Quincey & Sonance Remix)	7:57
6.	"Beautiful Day" (The Perfecto Mix)	7:51
7.	"In a Little While" (Nightmares on Wax Remix)	5:15
8.	"Walk On" (Wyclef Jean Remix)	4:44
9.	"When I Look at the World" (Picante Remix)	5:14
10.	"Elevation" (Escalation Mix)	7:05
11.	"Elevation" (Quincey & Sonance Remix)	6:55
Total length:		71:37

== Personnel ==
Adapted from the liner notes.

U2

- Bono – vocals, guitar, synthesizer (track 2)
- The Edge – guitar, piano, vocals, synthesizer (track 3), strings (track 5), organ (track 12)
- Adam Clayton – bass guitar
- Larry Mullen Jr. – drums, percussion

Additional musicians

- Paul Barrett – brass (track 2)
- Brian Eno – synthesizer (tracks 1–3, 6–11), programming (tracks 1, 11), backing vocals (track 5), string arrangement (track 6)
- Daniel Lanois – backing vocals (tracks 1, 5), additional guitar (tracks 2, 6, 7, 9–11)

Production

- Daniel Lanois – production (all track), mixing (track 9)
- Brian Eno – production (all tracks), mixing (tracks 9, 11)
- Steve Lillywhite – additional production and mixing (tracks 1, 4)
- Mike Hedges – additional production and mixing (track 8)
- Richard Stannard – additional production and mixing (track 6)
- Julian Gallagher – additional production and mixing (track 6)
- Richard Rainey – engineering (all tracks), mixing (tracks 5, 7)
- Ger McDonnell – engineering (track 8)
- Alex Haas – engineering (track 11)
- Tim Palmer – mixing (tracks 2, 3, 10, 12), additional engineering (track 1)
- Steve Fitzmaurice – mixing (track 6)
- Chris Heaney – engineering assistance (all tracks), mixing assistance (tracks 5, 7)
- Alvin Sweeney – additional engineering assistance (track 4), mixing assistance (tracks 3, 10)
- Jay Goin – engineering assistance, mixing assistance (track 2)
- Stephen Harris – additional engineering (tracks 1, 4), additional engineering assistance
- Mark Howard – additional engineering (track 12)
- Keith McDonnell – additional engineering assistance (track 8)
- Arnie Acosta – mastering (all tracks)

== Charts ==
=== Weekly charts ===
Weekly chart performance for All That You Can't Leave Behind
Chart (2000)	Peak position
Australian Albums (ARIA)	1
Austrian Albums (Ö3 Austria)	1
Belgian Albums (Ultratop Flanders)	1
Belgian Albums (Ultratop Wallonia)	1
Canadian Albums (Billboard)	1
Danish Albums (Hitlisten)	1
Dutch Albums (Album Top 100)	1
European Albums (Billboard)	1
Finnish Albums (Suomen virallinen lista)	1
French Albums (SNEP)	1
German Albums (Offizielle Top 100)	1
Hungarian Albums (MAHASZ)	2
Irish Albums (IRMA)	1
Italian Albums (FIMI)	1
Japanese Albums (Oricon)	6
New Zealand Albums (RMNZ)	1
Norwegian Albums (VG-lista)	1
Polish Albums (ZPAV)	2
Portuguese Albums (AFP)	1
Scottish Albums (Official Charts)	1
Spanish Albums (AFYVE)	1
Swedish Albums (Sverigetopplistan)	1
Swiss Albums (Schweizer Hitparade)	2
UK Albums (Official Charts)	1
US Billboard 200	3

Chart (2020)	Peak position
Czech Albums (ČNS IFPI)	39
US Top Catalog Albums (Billboard)	9
US Top Rock Albums (Billboard)	14
US Indie Store Album Sales (Billboard)	5

=== Year-end charts ===
Year-end chart performance for All That You Can't Leave Behind
Chart (2000)	Position
Australian Albums (ARIA)	8
Austrian Albums (Ö3 Austria)	21
Belgian Albums (Ultratop Flanders)	32
Belgian Albums (Ultratop Wallonia)	30
Canadian Albums (Nielsen SoundScan)	19
Danish Albums (Hitlisten)	13
Dutch Albums (Album Top 100)	3
European Albums (Music & Media)	29
French Albums (SNEP)	19
German Albums (Offizielle Top 100)	51
Italian Albums (FIMI)	6
Spanish Albums (AFYVE)	20
Swedish Albums & Compilations (Sverigetopplistan)	20
Swiss Albums (Schweizer Hitparade)	11
UK Albums (OCC)	30
US Billboard 200	153

Chart (2001)	Position
Australian Albums (ARIA)	10
Austrian Albums (Ö3 Austria)	16
Belgian Albums (Ultratop Flanders)	25
Belgian Albums (Ultratop Wallonia)	48
Canadian Albums (Nielsen SoundScan)	18
Danish Albums (Hitlisten)	16
Dutch Albums (Album Top 100)	7
European Albums (Music & Media)	7
French Albums (SNEP)	48
German Albums (Offizielle Top 100)	44
Irish Albums (IRMA)	6
Italian Albums (FIMI)	13
New Zealand Albums (RMNZ)	40
Spanish Albums (AFYVE)	40
Swiss Albums (Schweizer Hitparade)	27
UK Albums (OCC)	23
US Billboard 200	26

Chart (2002)	Position
Australian Albums (ARIA)	76
Canadian Albums (Nielsen SoundScan)	63
Canadian Alternative Albums (Nielsen SoundScan)	17

=== Decade-end charts ===
Chart (2000–09)	Position
Australian Albums (ARIA)	41
US Billboard 200	68

== Certifications and sales ==
Sales certifications for All That You Can't Leave Behind
Region	Certification	Certified units/sales
Argentina (CAPIF)	Platinum	60,000^{^}
Australia (ARIA)	5× Platinum	350,000^{^}
Austria (IFPI Austria)	Platinum	50,000^{*}
Belgium (BRMA)	2× Platinum	100,000^{*}
Brazil (Pro-Música Brasil)	Platinum	250,000^{*}
Canada (Music Canada)	5× Platinum	500,000^{^}
Denmark (IFPI Danmark)	2× Platinum	100,000^{^}
Finland (Musiikkituottajat)	Gold	27,312
France (SNEP)	Platinum	550,000
Germany (BVMI)	3× Gold	450,000^{^}
Hungary (MAHASZ)	Gold	
Italy (FIMI) sales since 2009	Gold	25,000^{‡}
Japan (RIAJ)	Platinum	200,000^{^}
Mexico (AMPROFON)	Platinum	150,000^{^}
Netherlands (NVPI)	2× Platinum	160,000^{^}
New Zealand (RMNZ)	3× Platinum	45,000^{^}
Norway (IFPI Norway)	Platinum	50,000^{*}
Poland (ZPAV)	Gold	50,000^{*}
South Africa (RISA)	3× Platinum	150,000^{*}
Spain (Promusicae)	3× Platinum	300,000^{^}
Sweden (GLF)	Platinum	80,000^{^}
Switzerland (IFPI Switzerland)	2× Platinum	100,000^{^}
United Kingdom (BPI)	4× Platinum	1,200,000^{‡}
United States (RIAA)	4× Platinum	4,400,000
Summaries
Europe (IFPI)	4× Platinum	4,000,000^{*}
Worldwide	—	12,000,000
^{*} Sales figures based on certification alone.^{^} Shipments figures based on certification alone.^{‡} Sales+streaming figures based on certification alone.
