= Wild Honey (U2 song) =

Song by U2

from the album All That You Can't Leave Behind
- Released: 30 October 2000
- Genre: Rock; pop
- Length: 3:47
- Label: Island, Interscope
- Composer: U2
- Lyricist: Bono
- Producers: Brian Eno and Daniel Lanois

"Wild Honey" is a song by the rock band U2. It is the seventh track on their 2000 album All That You Can't Leave Behind. The song was played eleven times during the Elevation Tour.

== Writing and recording ==
"Wild Honey" runs for 3:47 and is played in common time at a tempo of 125 beats per minute.

According to guitarist The Edge, "Wild Honey" broke up the album before the next track "Peace on Earth", and its placement in the running order was a misjudgement. The guitarist compared the song with The Beatles' "Ob-La-Di, Ob-La-Da". There was a lot of debate about whether or not "Wild Honey" should be included on All That You Can't Leave Behind, because the fun and the frivolity of the song was not something U2 are noted for. But producer Brian Eno loved it and thought it was like a Van Morrison song, and lead singer Bono wanted it on the album, saying, "it was playful and broke the mood. Call it a sorbet between courses." Brian Hiatt of MTV considered Bono's vocals on the track to be "hoarse, gritty and soulful".

"It's one of the oddest moments on the record...It was never monkeyed with," said producer Daniel Lanois.

"Wild Honey" was not the kind of song that drummer Larry Mullen, Jr. enjoyed. Despite being a playful side to U2 people rarely get to see, Mullen said, "it wasn't one of my favourites."

The song is featured in the 2001 film Vanilla Sky.
