= Elevation (song) =

2001 single by U2

Single by U2

from the album All That You Can't Leave Behind
- B-side: "Don't Take Your Guns to Town"
- Released: 25 June 2001
- Recorded: 2000
- Studio: HQ (Dublin, Ireland)
- Genre: Alternative rock
- Length: 3:46 (album version); 3:35 (Tomb Raider mix)
- Label: Island; Interscope
- Composer: U2
- Lyricist: Bono
- Producers: Daniel Lanois; Brian Eno

U2 singles chronology
"Stuck in a Moment You Can't Get Out Of" (2001)	"Elevation" (2001)	"Walk On" (2001)

Music video
- "Elevation" on YouTube

Alternative cover
- 12-inch vinyl cover

"Elevation" is a song by Irish rock band U2. It is the third track on their tenth studio album, All That You Can't Leave Behind (2000), and was released as the album's third single on 25 June 2001. The song became the band's 16th number-one single in their native Ireland and their second number one in the Netherlands. It also topped the Canadian Singles Chart and reached the top 10 in Australia, Denmark, Finland, Italy, Norway, Spain, and the United Kingdom. A different mix of the song, entitled the "Tomb Raider mix", was included on the soundtrack of the 2001 film Lara Croft: Tomb Raider. In 2002, "Elevation" won the Grammy Award for Best Rock Performance by a Duo or Group with Vocal at the 44th Annual Grammy Awards ceremony. The song lent its namesake to the band's 2001 Elevation Tour.

== Writing and composition ==
Adam [Clayton] came into his own on "Elevation" because he is the hip-hop man in the band and there is a real hip-hop attitude in the rhythm section.

— The Edge

"Elevation" was inspired by a sound that guitarist the Edge achieved from a vintage effects unit when playing his Gibson SG guitar through a Fender Bassman amplifier. He likened the pedal to "some mad funkadelic thing". Co-producer Daniel Lanois, who had brought the unit to the studio, called it his "secret weapon", saying: "It's like a distortion pedal that has a warp, or a tone control, built on. As you push the pedal down you get the high frequency." Within ten minutes, the Edge developed the riff that inspired the rest of the song. He then programmed a rhythm on a drum machine to which the band started playing and lead singer Bono improvised vocals. For the heavily distorted sound of the song's main guitar riff, the Edge played his instrument through a 1970s Hiwatt amplifier. The wah-wah guitar effect at the end of the song was achieved by filtering the tone through an Electrix Filter Factory sound module. The Edge said that "Elevation" was light relief among a sequence of serious songs on the album that included "Stuck in a Moment You Can't Get Out Of", "Kite" and "Walk On", which he collectively described as "farewell songs of one kind of another". The song was mixed at Windmill Lane Studios in Dublin by Tim Palmer and was included on their 2000 album All That You Can't Leave Behind.

== Music video ==
The band (as "Evil U2") in the music video for "Elevation".

The music video for "Elevation" was directed by Joseph Kahn. It was shot in the New York Street area of Universal Studios Hollywood's backlot, better known as Studio Tour.

Set with Lara Croft (Angelina Jolie) along with Bono, the music video also acts as a short film with its story about the rescue of the Edge (inserted into footage from the 2001 film Lara Croft: Tomb Raider) from the "evil U2". It begins with Bono receiving a phone call in the middle of a crowded New York street from his evil counterpart known as "evil Bono", who states that they have captured The Edge and demands for "the key". The evil counterpart announces that Bono himself is surrounded before ending with the words "not even Lara Croft can help you now", which puzzles Bono. After escaping and rescuing civilians from several of the "evil U2's" murder attempts, the band reunites and performs a "rock-off" against their evil counterparts, which ends with the "good U2" emerging victorious. The "good U2" join forces with Croft and leave the scene for an unknown place, passing a street with levitating vehicles and a pachyderm (remnants of the "evil U2's" crimes), ending with a Boeing 747-400 flying overhead before fading to black (the plane is also seen at the very beginning of the video).

The video was released as a digital DVD ("Version 7" below), the band's first, on 16 July 2001. It was later featured on the Lara Croft: Tomb Raider DVD, as a special feature. The making of the video was shown on MTV's Making the Video.

== Live performances ==
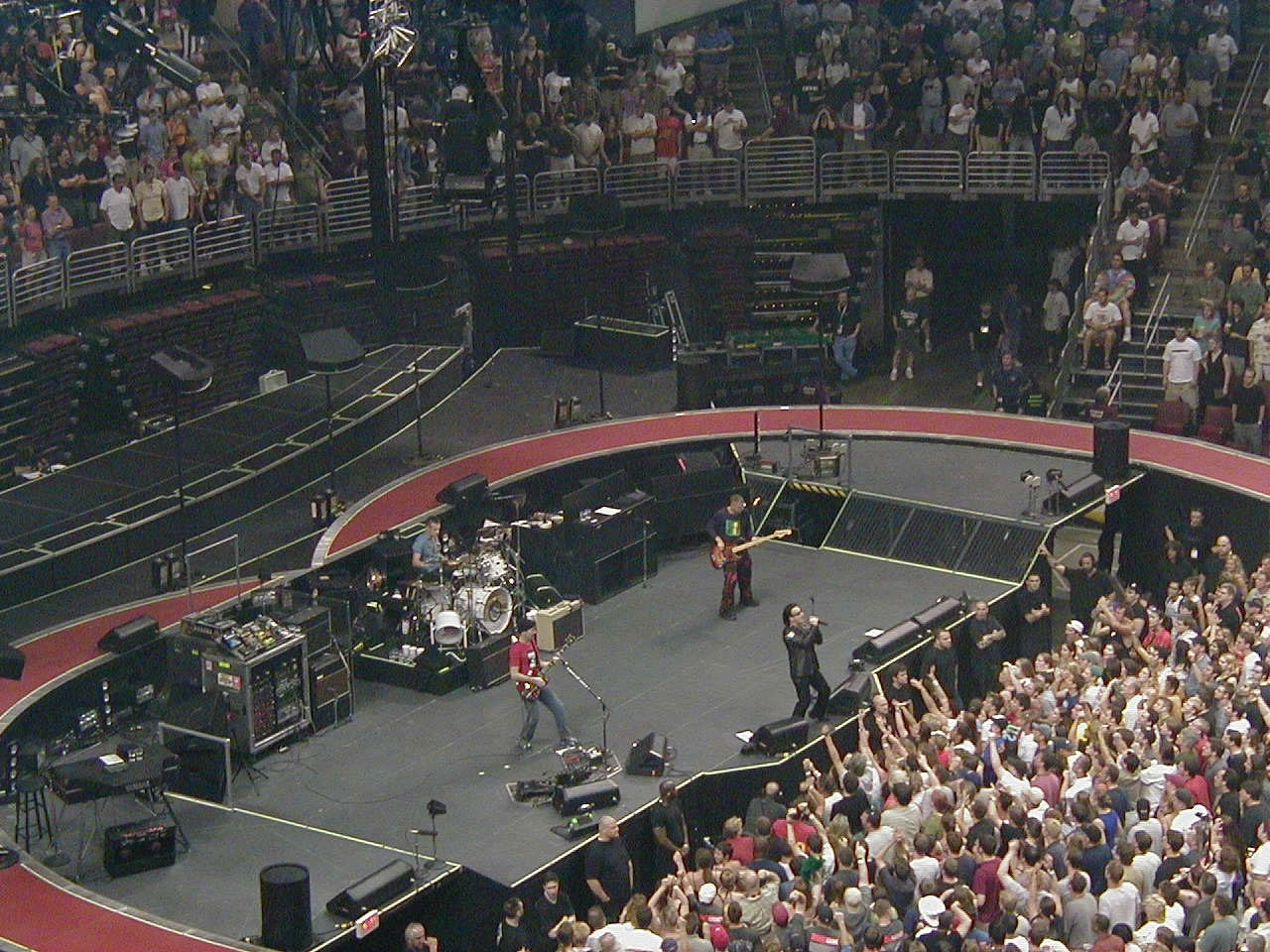
U2 performing "Elevation" during the Elevation Tour in Cologne, Germany. The house lights remained on during the first half of the song.

The song was played at every concert on the Elevation Tour, typically opening the concert. Shows would traditionally open under the venue house lights with the Influx Mix of "Elevation" playing as the band's intro music. The band then played the first half of the song with the house lights still on, which would then be switched off just before the third verse. The song was also played live during every show of the 2005-2006 Vertigo Tour, where it was played without drums and bass for the first verse and chorus before the rest of the band joins in.

On the 2009-2011 U2 360° Tour, the song was initially sporadically played on the first leg before becoming a mainstay for the rest of the tour, typically appearing in the first half of the set. On the 2015 Innocence + Experience Tour it was played as part of the "e-stage" set at about half of the tour's shows.

The song was played at every date of The Joshua Tree Tour 2017, played in the encore after "Beautiful Day". On the 2018 Experience + Innocence Tour the song was also played at every date and opened the second act on the "e-stage", this tour featured a return of the Influx Mix as intro music to "Elevation" which was played as the band walked through the "barricage". On The Joshua Tree Tour 2019, performances of the song were very similar to the Experience + Innocence Tour including using the Influx Mix as intro music, it however opened the encore instead of the "e-stage" act. On both these tours, Bono performed the song as his "MacPhisto" persona from the 1992-1993 Zoo TV Tour.

== Critical reception ==
"Elevation" received positive reviews. When reviewing the album, Adam Sweeting from The Guardian praised the song, calling it an "irresistible mix of crude techno and raw guitar-swagger." New Zealand Herald editor Russell Baillie called it a "grand surge" noting the song's guitar and vocals which he described as "churning" and "giddy", respectively. NME was positive toward the song for "the well-exercised U2 template." Along with "Wild Honey" and "Walk On," Entertainment Weekly contributor David Browne called the song "lusty" and stated it has "the charging-horse feel of U2's youth, with a bumpy-noise upgrade courtesy of producers Brian Eno and Daniel Lanois."

Brent DiCrescenzo of Drowned in Sound gave a negative review of the song, labelling Bono's lyrics as: "slaughters hope with reckless chops of the hackneyed sword."

== Legacy ==
The version of the song released as a single was entitled the "Tomb Raider Mix" (remixed by Chris Vrenna), differing significantly from the album version, in that it features guitars with a more "hard rock" sound than the electronic-inspired feel of the album version. The drums in the single version are also harder, with additional tambourine included. The name comes from its role in the soundtrack to the 2001 film, Lara Croft: Tomb Raider. This arrangement is how U2 have performed the song since its release. "Elevation" won the Grammy Award for Best Rock Performance by a Duo or Group with Vocal at the 44th Annual Grammy Awards in 2002.

Elevation Partners, a $1.9 billion private equity company of which Bono was a co-founder and managing director, was named after the song. In 2006, when the NFL asked teams to stop using "Rock and Roll (Part 2)" by Gary Glitter as a touchdown song, the New England Patriots chose to use "Elevation"; they used it for the 2006 through 2009 seasons. The song has been used from 2006 to 2008 when the Vancouver Canucks score goals at home; it was used regularly during the 2007 NBA Playoffs and before kickoff at Colorado Rapids games (the Rapids play in Dick's Sporting Goods Park in Commerce City, Colorado, the stadium at the highest elevation in MLS). "Elevation" appeared on the soundtrack to the video game NBA 2K13. The song appeared in 2002 season 4 episode "Christopher" of the series The Sopranos and the 2002 season 1 episode "Leech" of the series Smallville. It is currently used as the touchdown celebration song by the Denver Broncos.

"Elevation" is played during the opening of the popular Machinima series Clear Skies.

== Formats and track listings ==
Version 1 (CD version released only in the UK)
No.	Title	Length
1.	"Elevation" (Tomb Raider mix)	3:35
2.	"Elevation" (Escalation mix)	7:04
3.	"Elevation" (Vandit club mix)	8:54

Version 2 (first regular CD edition, released in Europe, Canada and the UK)
No.	Title	Length
1.	"Elevation" (Tomb Raider mix)	3:35
2.	"Last Night on Earth" (Live at Foro Sol, Mexico City, Mexico, 3 December 1997)	6:20
3.	"Don't Take Your Guns to Town" (Johnny Cash cover)	4:11

Version 3 (Europe only)
No.	Title	Length
1.	"Elevation" (Tomb Raider mix)	3:35
2.	"Elevation" (Biffco mix)	4:18

Version 4 (second regular CD-single released in Europe, Australia and Canada. The version released in Australia also had "Last Night on Earth" (Live from Mexico City))
No.	Title	Length
1.	"Elevation" (Tomb Raider mix)	3:35
2.	"Elevation" (Escalation mix)	7:04
3.	"Elevation" (Influx remix)	4:02
4.	"Elevation" (Quincey and Sonance mix)	6:53

Version 5 (labeled the "Tour Edition", this edition was numbered and sold on tour stops throughout Europe)
No.	Title	Length
1.	"Elevation" (Tomb Raider mix)	3:35
2.	"I Remember You" (Live at Irving Plaza, Manhattan, New York City, New York) (Ramones cover)	1:28
3.	"New York" (Live at Irving Plaza, Manhattan, New York City, New York)	5:42
4.	"I Will Follow" (Live at Irving Plaza, Manhattan, New York City, New York)	3:51

Version 6 (released in Australia only)
No.	Title	Length
1.	"Elevation" (Tomb Raider mix)	3:35
2.	"I Remember You" (Live at Irving Plaza, Manhattan, New York City, New York) (Ramones cover)	1:28
3.	"New York" (Live at Irving Plaza, Manhattan, New York City, New York)	5:42
4.	"Don't Take Your Guns to Town" (Johnny Cash cover)	4:11
5.	"Elevation" (Biffco mix)	4:18

Version 7 (DVD-single edition)
No.	Title	Length
1.	"Elevation" (Tomb Raider mix)	3:35
2.	"Elevation" (Tomb Raider video)	3:50
3.	"Excerpts from MTV's Making the Video"	3:46

Version 8 (double 12-inch vinyl released in the UK)
No.	Title	Length
1.	"Beautiful Day" (Quincey and Sonance mix)	7:56
2.	"Beautiful Day" (Perfecto mix)	7:48
3.	"Beautiful Day" (David Holmes remix)	5:34
4.	"Elevation" (Vandit club mix)	8:54
5.	"Elevation" (Influx remix)	5:34
6.	"Elevation" (Escalation mix)	5:34
7.	"Elevation" (Quincey and Sonance remix)	5:34

== Credits and personnel ==
U2

- Bono – lead vocals
- The Edge – guitar, backing vocals, synthesizers
- Adam Clayton – bass guitar
- Larry Mullen, Jr. – drums, percussion

Additional performers

- Brian Eno – synthesizers

Technical

- Production – Daniel Lanois, Eno
- Engineering – Richard Rainey
- Assistant engineer – Chris Heaney
- Mixing – Tim Palmer
- Assistant mixer – Alvin Sweeney

== Charts ==
=== Weekly charts ===
Weekly chart performance for "Elevation"
Chart (2001)	Peak position
Australia (ARIA)	6
Austria (Ö3 Austria Top 40)	21
Belgium (Ultratop 50 Flanders)	14
Belgium (Ultratop 50 Wallonia)	13
Canada (Nielsen SoundScan)	1
Croatia (HRT)	3
Denmark (Tracklisten)	6
Europe (Eurochart Hot 100)	5
Finland (Suomen virallinen lista)	9
France (SNEP)	34
Germany (GfK)	31
Ireland (IRMA)	1
Italy (FIMI)	3
Italy Airplay (Music & Media)	5
Netherlands (Dutch Top 40)	1
Netherlands (Single Top 100)	1
New Zealand (Recorded Music NZ)	35
Norway (VG-lista)	5
Portugal (AFP)	1
Scottish Singles Sales (Official Charts)	3
Spain (Promusicae)	2
Sweden (Sverigetopplistan)	33
Switzerland (Schweizer Hitparade)	20
UK Singles (Official Charts)	3
US Bubbling Under Hot 100 (Billboard)	16
US Adult Alternative Airplay (Billboard)	4
US Alternative Airplay (Billboard)	8
US Dance Club Songs (Billboard)	32
US Mainstream Rock Airplay (Billboard)	21

=== Year-end charts ===
2001 year-end chart performance for "Elevation"
Chart (2001)	Position
Canada (Nielsen SoundScan) Part 1	14
Canada (Nielsen SoundScan) Part 2	13
Canada Radio (Nielsen BDS)	73
Ireland (IRMA)	54
Netherlands (Dutch Top 40)	20
Netherlands (Single Top 100)	24
Spain (AFYVE)	11
UK Singles (OCC)	136
US Modern Rock Tracks (Billboard)	47
US Triple-A (Billboard)	19

2002 year-end chart performance for "Elevation"
Chart (2002)	Position
Canada (Nielsen SoundScan)	135

== Certifications ==
Certifications for "Elevation"
Region	Certification	Certified units/sales
United Kingdom (BPI) Sales since 2005	Silver	200,000^{‡}
^{‡} Sales+streaming figures based on certification alone.

== Release history ==
Release dates and formats for "Elevation"
Region	Date	Format(s)	Label(s)	Ref(s).
United States	10 April 2001	Mainstream rock; active rock; alternative radio	Interscope	
Australia	25 June 2001	CD	Island	
Europe	2 July 2001	CD	Island	
Canada	10 July 2001	CD	Island	
Japan	11 July 2001	CD	Island	
United Kingdom	16 July 2001	CD; DVD	Island	

== See also ==
- List of number-one singles of 2001 (Ireland)
- List of number-one singles of 2001 (Canada)
- List of Dutch Top 40 number-one singles of 2001
- List of covers of U2 songs – Elevation
