= When I Look at the World =

Song by U2

from the album All That You Can't Leave Behind
- Released: 30 October 2000
- Genre: Rock
- Length: 4:14
- Label: Island / Interscope
- Composer: U2
- Lyricists: Bono and The Edge
- Producers: Brian Eno, Daniel Lanois

"When I Look at the World" is a song by Irish rock band U2, and the ninth track on their 2000 album All That You Can't Leave Behind.

== Writing and recording ==
The music for "When I Look at the World" was quickly recorded by guitarist the Edge, bassist Adam Clayton, and drummer Larry Mullen Jr., after which the Edge added guitar overdubs. He used an Electro-Harmonix Micro Synthesizer effects unit for the "mad distorted tone" in the song. A DigiTech Whammy pedal was used for the guitar solo, as well as during the choruses with an echo effect. Co-producer Daniel Lanois played acoustic guitar on the song; his part was described by the Edge as "really mournful" and complementary to the "heavy chords" that the Edge was playing. At the end of the recording sessions for All That You Can't Leave Behind, people were asking the Edge how he achieved the various guitar sounds in the song, but he realised that the song had been recorded so quickly he could not remember. As a result, he had no idea how it could be replicated for live performances; the song has never been performed live by U2, other than a lyrical snippet during a performance of "Bad" in 2001.

Lyrically, "When I Look at the World" is about a person's faith being shaken by tragedy. Lead vocalist Bono said that the song was told from "the point of view of someone who is having a crisis of faith looking at someone who has built their house upon the rock." The Edge interpreted the lyrics as being about seeing the world from someone else's perspective and finding comfort in that. Journalist Niall Stokes described "When I Look at the World" as being about the commitment of Bono's wife Ali Hewson to the victims of the Chernobyl disaster.
