= Stuck in a Moment You Can't Get Out Of =

2001 single by U2

Single by U2

from the album All That You Can't Leave Behind
- B-side: "Big Girls Are Best"
- Released: 29 January 2001
- Studio: HQ (Dublin, Ireland)
- Genre: Rock
- Length: 4:32 (album version); 3:42 (radio edit)
- Label: Island; Interscope
- Composer: U2
- Lyricists: Bono and the Edge
- Producers: Daniel Lanois; Brian Eno

U2 singles chronology
"Beautiful Day" (2000)	"Stuck in a Moment You Can't Get Out Of" (2001)	"Elevation" (2001)

Music video
- Official video on YouTube; US version on YouTube; Eze version on YouTube

"Stuck in a Moment You Can't Get Out Of" is a song by Irish rock band U2. It is the second track on their tenth studio album, All That You Can't Leave Behind (2000), and was released as the album's second single on 29 January 2001. The band's lead vocalist Bono has said the song was inspired by a fictional conversation with his friend Michael Hutchence about suicide. The song peaked at number 52 on the US Billboard Hot 100 and topped the charts of Canada, Ireland and Italy while reaching the top 10 in Australia, Denmark, Finland, the Netherlands, Norway, Spain, and the United Kingdom. In 2002, the song won the Grammy Award for Best Pop Performance by a Duo or Group with Vocal at the 44th Annual Grammy Awards ceremony.

== Writing and composition ==
"Stuck in a Moment You Can't Get Out Of" originated from a gospel-influenced chord progression that guitarist the Edge composed on a piano in a Japanese hotel room. He said: "I suppose I was consciously looking for something in that [gospel] tradition. Having been through that whole experimentation period during Pop—with techno and dance ideas and dance aesthetics—it seemed like I wanted to get back to something a bit more earthy." During the recording sessions for All That You Can't Leave Behind, the Edge played the piano piece in a music sequencer, after which co-producer Brian Eno removed every first and second note, leaving every third note. Eno then set it into a different keyboard with extensive treatments, resulting in what the Edge called an "otherworldly effect" on top of his "traditional gospel piano sequence".

Co-producer Daniel Lanois said the recorded version of the song was essentially a live take performed by the band with him and Eno. On guitar, Lanois played "the harmony to The Edge's part". The Edge achieved a clean guitar tone by plugging his 1950s Fender Stratocaster guitar directly into a Fender Bassman amplifier. The song ends with a "choral chant" written by the Edge; Lanois said they had always wanted to compose such a part before. The group tried several variations of it before settling on the version that appears on record. The vocals were sung by the Edge, Lanois, and Eno; Lanois said it was easy to imagine hiring a choir to sing the part but "if you want it to sound like a U2 record, then you use the team". Mick Jagger and his daughter Elizabeth recorded backing vocals for the song, although these did not make the final mix.

U2's lead singer Bono wrote the lyrics about the 1997 suicide of his close friend Michael Hutchence, lead singer of the band INXS. The song is written in the form of an argument about suicide in which Bono tries to convince Hutchence of the act's foolishness. Bono characterised the song as a fight between friends, which he felt guilty for never having with Hutchence. As Bono said in 2005: "It's a row between mates. You're kinda trying to wake them up out of an idea. In my case it's a row I didn't have while he was alive. I feel the biggest respect I could pay to him was not to write some stupid soppy song, so I wrote a really tough, nasty little number, slapping him around the head. And I'm sorry, but that's how it came out of me." New York magazine's Caryn Rose wrote in Vulture that it was "a gospel song at its heart... The last three stanzas are heart-wrenching."

== Release ==
"Stuck in a Moment You Can't Get Out Of" was released in the UK on 29 January 2001, in Japan on 7 February, in Australia on 12 February, in the United States on 6 August, and in Canada on 30 October. The song peaked at No. 1 on the Billboard Adult Alternative Airplay chart.

== Live performances ==
The song was performed at every show on the Elevation Tour in 2001. The song was not played again until the third leg on the Vertigo Tour in 2005 in an acoustic form by Bono and The Edge. The full band electric version was revived for the sixth leg of the Vertigo Tour in 2006. The song was performed at the Rock and Roll Hall of Fame with Mick Jagger in 2009. The song was performed on the U2 360° Tour, again in an acoustic form by Bono and The Edge. The song was played five times on the 2015 Innocence + Experience Tour. These performances were by the full band and featured The Edge on the piano. The song was not performed on the Experience + Innocence Tour in 2018, but was played during many promotional shows for the Songs of Experience album. It made two appearances on The Joshua Tree Tour 2019. Both performances were in Sydney and were dedicated to Michael Hutchence.

== Music videos ==
Three official music videos were filmed for the song. The first video (known as the US version) is directed by Joseph Kahn, features an American football game between the "Flys" [sic] and the "Lemons" filmed at the Houston Astrodome (named The Unforgettable Fire Dome in the video), and contains various inside jokes and references to the band's past—such as the team names themselves, which were the titles of two U2 singles released in the 1990s. The video features a brief cameo in the beginning from John Madden, whose lines also feature several U2 references. The main part of the video shows Brendan Fehr as a placekicker named Paul Hewson—Bono's real name—forced to relive a field goal he missed that cost his team the game.

The second video, directed by Kevin Godley and aimed at an international audience, shows Bono being thrown out of a van several times, as if "stuck in a moment". At the end of the video, the rest of the band helps him up.

The third and final video is the "Èze version", filmed in Èze, France, and features live footage of the band recording All That You Can't Leave Behind, intercut with footage of the band roaming the streets of Èze.

All three videos were remastered in high definition and uploaded to the band's YouTube channel in 2020.

== B-sides ==
The "Stuck in a Moment You Can't Get Out Of" singles were backed with the following B-sides:

- "Big Girls Are Best" – produced by Flood and Howie B, this song was recorded after the PopMart Tour. Its lyrics include a reference to the Copacabana Palace hotel in Rio de Janeiro, Brazil ("Avenue Atantico, 1702"), where U2 stayed when they played in Rio in 1998.
- "Beautiful Day" (Quincey and Sonance Remix) – this remix was released, in a shorter version, in a promotional CD along with an issue of Q magazine.
- "Beautiful Day" and "New York" (Live from Farmclub.com) – this was a performance on 27 October 2000 for the American TV show, during U2's promotional tour of the All That You Can't Leave Behind album.
- "All I Want Is You" and "Even Better Than the Real Thing" (Live from Manray) – the first public listening of All That You Can't Leave Behind in the famous Paris nightclub was capped with an impromptu performance by U2, the first since the end of the PopMart Tour. These two songs were lifted from that performance.
- "Stay (Faraway, So Close!)" (Live from Toronto) – this performance from the Elevation Tour was transmitted live for the We Know Where You Live, Live! TV special, which was later released in DVD.
- "Elevation" (Vandit Club Remix) this remix was done by Paul Van Dyk.

== Alternative versions ==
There are three versions of this song:

- The album version, which appears on All That You Can't Leave Behind. This is the original version of the song.
- The acoustic version, which appears on the single, as well as in the "Walk On" single and the 7 EP. The same vocal track is used with a different, stripped-down arrangement.
- The radio edit, which was used in the promotional radio singles in the US. Part of the first verse and the outro are edited out, leaving the song with about three and a half minutes.

== Covers ==
Somalian-Canadian rapper K'naan performed the song live in July 2010 for iHeartRadio.

Actress Scarlett Johansson covered the song for the soundtrack to the 2021 animated film, Sing 2, in which Bono appeared in a voice role as the character Clay Calloway.

== Formats and track listings ==
All music is composed by U2.

Version 1
No.	Title	Lyrics	Length
1.	"Stuck in a Moment You Can't Get Out Of" (Album version)	Bono and The Edge	4:33
2.	"Big Girls Are Best"	Bono and The Edge	3:37
3.	"Beautiful Day" (Quincey and Sonance remix)	Bono	7:55
4.	"Beautiful Day" (Perfecto mix)	Bono	7:48
Total length:			24:01

Note

- Track 4 only available on the Australian limited edition CD

Version 2
No.	Title	Lyrics	Length
1.	"Stuck in a Moment You Can't Get Out Of" (Album version)	Bono and The Edge	4:33
2.	"Beautiful Day" (Live on Farmclub.com)	Bono	4:48
3.	"New York" (Live on Farmclub.com)	Bono	6:01
4.	"Beautiful Day" (David Holmes remix)	Bono	5:34
Total length:			20:58

Note

- Track 4 only available on the Australian limited edition CD

Version 3
No.	Title	Lyrics	Length
1.	"Stuck in a Moment You Can't Get Out Of" (Album version)	Bono and The Edge	4:33
2.	"Big Girls Are Best"	Bono and The Edge	3:37
3.	"All I Want Is You" (Live at Manray, Paris)	Bono	5:26
4.	"Even Better Than the Real Thing" (Live at Manray, Paris)	Bono	3:55
Total length:			17:33

Note

- Only available in France

Version 4
No.	Title	Lyrics	Length
1.	"Stuck in a Moment You Can't Get Out Of" (Album Version)	Bono and The Edge	4:33
2.	"Beautiful Day" (Live on Farmclub.com)	Bono	4:48
3.	"New York" (Live on Farmclub.com)	Bono	6:01
4.	"Big Girls Are Best"	Bono and The Edge	3:37
5.	"Beautiful Day" (Quincey and Sonance remix)	Bono	7:55
Total length:			18:19

Note

- Released only in Japan, featuring most B-sides from both regular CD releases

Version 5
No.	Title	Lyrics	Length
1.	"Stuck in a Moment You Can't Get Out Of" (Radio edit)	Bono and The Edge	3:42
2.	"Stuck in a Moment You Can't Get Out Of" (Acoustic version)	Bono and The Edge	3:42
3.	"Stay (Faraway, So Close!)" (Live in Toronto, Ontario, Canada)	Bono	5:39
4.	"Elevation" (Vandit club remix)	Bono	8:54

Note

- A Canada-only release on late October 2001, also available on CD

== Personnel ==
U2

- Bono – vocals, synthesizers
- The Edge – vocals, guitar, piano
- Adam Clayton – bass guitar
- Larry Mullen Jr. – drums

Additional musicians

- Brian Eno – synthesizers
- Daniel Lanois – additional guitar
- Paul Barrett – brass

== Charts ==
=== Weekly charts ===
Weekly chart performance for "Stuck in a Moment You Can't Get Out Of"
Chart (2001)	Peak position
Australia (ARIA)	3
Austria (Ö3 Austria Top 40)	38
Belgium (Ultratop 50 Flanders)	31
Belgium (Ultratop 50 Wallonia)	33
Canada (Nielsen SoundScan)	1
Canada CHR (Nielsen BDS)	13
Croatia (HRT)	2
Denmark (Tracklisten)	9
Europe (Eurochart Hot 100)	5
Finland (Suomen virallinen lista)	10
France (SNEP)	31
Germany (GfK)	40
Ireland (IRMA)	1
Italy (FIMI)	1
Italy Airplay (Music & Media)	12
Netherlands (Dutch Top 40)	7
Netherlands (Single Top 100)	12
New Zealand (Recorded Music NZ)	17
Norway (VG-lista)	4
Portugal (AFP)	2
Scottish Singles Sales (Official Charts)	2
Spain (Promusicae)	2
Sweden (Sverigetopplistan)	23
Switzerland (Schweizer Hitparade)	38
UK Singles (Official Charts)	2
US Billboard Hot 100	52
US Adult Alternative Airplay (Billboard)	1
US Adult Pop Airplay (Billboard)	9
US Alternative Airplay (Billboard)	35
US Mainstream Rock Airplay (Billboard)	35
US Pop Airplay (Billboard)	27

=== Year-end charts ===
2001 year-end chart performance for "Stuck in a Moment You Can't Get Out Of"
Chart (2001)	Position
Australia (ARIA)	91
Canada (Nielsen SoundScan)	20
Canada Radio (Nielsen BDS)	69
Ireland (IRMA)	44
Netherlands (Dutch Top 40)	94
UK Singles (OCC)	119
US Adult Top 40 (Billboard)	43
US Triple-A (Billboard)	22

2002 year-end chart performance for "Stuck in a Moment You Can't Get Out Of"
Chart (2002)	Position
Canada (Nielsen SoundScan)	38
US Adult Top 40 (Billboard)	27

== Certifications ==
Certifications and sales for "Stuck in a Moment You Can't Get Out Of"
Region	Certification	Certified units/sales
Australia (ARIA)	Gold	35,000^{^}
New Zealand (RMNZ)	Gold	15,000^{‡}
United Kingdom (BPI)	Silver	200,000^{‡}
^{^} Shipments figures based on certification alone.^{‡} Sales+streaming figures based on certification alone.

== Release history ==
Release dates and formats for "Stuck in a Moment You Can't Get Out Of"
Region	Date	Format(s)	Label(s)	Ref(s).
United Kingdom	29 January 2001	CD; cassette	Island	
Japan	7 February 2001	CD	Island	
Australia	12 February 2001	CD	Island	
United States	6 August 2001	Hot adult contemporary; triple A radio	Interscope	
United States	7 August 2001	Mainstream rock; alternative radio	Interscope	
Canada	30 October 2001	CD	Interscope	

== See also ==
- List of covers of U2 songs – Stuck in a Moment You Can't Get Out Of
- List of number-one singles of 2001 (Canada)
- List of number-one singles of 2001 (Ireland)
- List of number-one hits of 2001 (Italy)
