= Peace on Earth (U2 song) =

2000 song by U2

Song by U2

from the album All That You Can't Leave Behind
- Released: 30 October 2000
- Genre: Rock, pop rock
- Length: 4:49
- Label: Island / Interscope
- Composer: U2
- Lyricist: Bono
- Producers: Daniel Lanois and Brian Eno, with additional production by Mike Hedges

"Peace on Earth" is a song by rock band U2 and the eighth track on their 2000 album All That You Can't Leave Behind. Its lyrics were inspired by the Omagh bombing in Northern Ireland on 15 August 1998.

The song lists the names of people killed in the bombing. Similarly, inspiration for the lyric, "She never got to say goodbye / To see the colour in his eyes / Now he's in the dirt" comes from the funeral of James Barker, another victim of the bombing. The Irish Times quoted his mother Donna Barker as stating, "I never realised how green his eyes were."

After the September 11, 2001 attacks, "Peace on Earth" took on additional meaning and consequently was used as an encore song during the band's Elevation Tour, coupled with "Walk On". The two songs were similarly paired during the band's performance on the telethon America: A Tribute to Heroes.

== Writing and recording ==
"Peace on Earth" was written in response to the Omagh bombing of 15 August 1998, the same day that it occurred. The attack, which was committed by the paramilitary group the Real Irish Republican Army, killed 29 people. Lead singer Bono was dismayed by the event, calling it "the lowest day of my life, outside of personal losses". Earlier that year in May, U2 had performed at a Yes Campaign event supporting the Good Friday Agreement to end the violence of the Troubles; the agreement was approved three days later. Bono feared the bombing would be the end of the Northern Ireland peace process. During the holiday season that year, he felt that: "the whole 'peace on earth, goodwill to all men' struck a sour note. It was hard to be a believer that Christmas."

Guitarist the Edge said that "Peace on Earth" came together rather quickly, as he had pre-written the music and then Bono developed his vocal part at the microphone. The Edge used a DigiTech Whammy effect pedal on the song to create "this bizarre, atmospheric, almost Chinese-sounding" guitar tone. He described the part as a "5th below and a 4th above". Throughout the songwriting process, the Edge was sceptical of a lyric in the song ("I'm sick of hearing again and again that there's gonna be peace on earth"), believing it to be too cynical and that the line should have been changed to "that there's never gonna be peace on earth". The song was one of the hardest for U2 to finish on All That You Can't Leave Behind. Co-producer Brian Eno contributed heavily to shaping the song but was absent at the end of the album's recording sessions, having become burned out by the creative process. As a result, the band employed producer Mike Hedges to assist with the song's completion. The vocals for "Peace on Earth" were the final ones recorded on the night before the band's deadline to deliver the album to the record company.

A stripped-down, acoustic version of the song is included on the group's 2023 album Songs of Surrender, with the Edge performing the lead vocals.

== Live performances ==
The band performed the song most notably during the Elevation Tour in 2001, using it along with "Walk On" as an encore. On 21 September 2001, U2 performed a few verses of "Peace on Earth" along with "Walk On" in London, England, for the simulcast telethon America: A Tribute to Heroes. The telethon was produced to raise money for victims of the September 11 attacks. During that performance, Bono replaced the original "I'm sick of hearing again and again that there's gonna be peace on Earth" with "I'm sick of hearing again and again that there's never gonna be peace on Earth." The band performed the song for the first time in over 20 years on 18 February 2024 during their residency U2:UV Achtung Baby Live at Sphere in the Las Vegas Valley, in response to the ongoing Gaza war.

== Reception ==
Irish journalist Niall Stokes calls "Peace on Earth" the band's most "agnostic song yet", saying that it "takes that sense of abandonment" felt in "Wake Up Dead Man" "a stage further". Bill Graham echoes this view asking if this is "'Wake Up Dead Man' part two?". Exclaiming that, "Bono does little to hide the bitterness as he spits out the words "peace on earth". Critics have also compared and contrasted the song with the band's earlier single "Sunday Bloody Sunday". Višnja Cogan writes the "two songs deal with the same subject: the conflict and violence in Northern Ireland, whichever side it comes from. However, 'Sunday Bloody Sunday' deals with an historical event and is approached in a particular way: the ideas of surrender, forgiveness and neutrality are very much present. "Peace on Earth" was written in the aftermath of Omagh and is much more emotional." Ryan Jones of The Bergen Record felt that "Peace on Earth" contained echoes of the band's 1987 song "Mothers of the Disappeared" in its lyrics and the tone of the instrumental prelude.

After the September 11 attacks, "Peace on Earth" gained widespread popularity in the United States. For instance, a Las Vegas radio station began playing the song immediately afterwards and it soon became one of their most requested songs. It subsequently became highly requested on different radio stations in other American cities as well.

== Personnel ==
- Bono - vocals, acoustic guitar
- The Edge - guitar
- Adam Clayton - bass guitar
- Larry Mullen Jr. - drums, percussion
- Brian Eno - synthesizers
