= Until the End of the World (song) =

Promotional single by U2

from the album Achtung Baby
- Released: 18 November 1991
- Recorded: October 1990 – September 1991
- Studio: Hansa Ton Studios (Berlin); Elsinore (Dalkey); Windmill Lane Studios (Dublin); STS (Dublin)
- Genre: Alternative rock
- Length: 4:39
- Label: Island
- Composer: U2
- Lyricist: Bono
- Producer: Daniel Lanois with Brian Eno

"Until the End of the World" is a song by the Irish rock band U2 and the fourth track from their 1991 album Achtung Baby. The song began as a guitar riff composed by lead vocalist Bono from a demo, which the band revisited with success after talking with German filmmaker Wim Wenders about providing music for the soundtrack of his 1991 film Until the End of the World. The song's lyrics describe a fictional conversation between Jesus Christ and Judas Iscariot. The first verse discusses the Last Supper; the second is about Judas identifying Jesus with a kiss in the Garden of Gethsemane; and the final is about Judas' suicide after being overwhelmed with guilt and sadness.

"Until the End of the World" enjoyed airplay on alternative and rock radio in the United States, where it was released as a promotional single; it peaked within the top 5 of Billboard's Modern Rock Tracks and Album Rock Tracks charts. It also peaked at number 69 on the Canadian RPM Top 100 singles chart.

== Writing, recording, and production ==
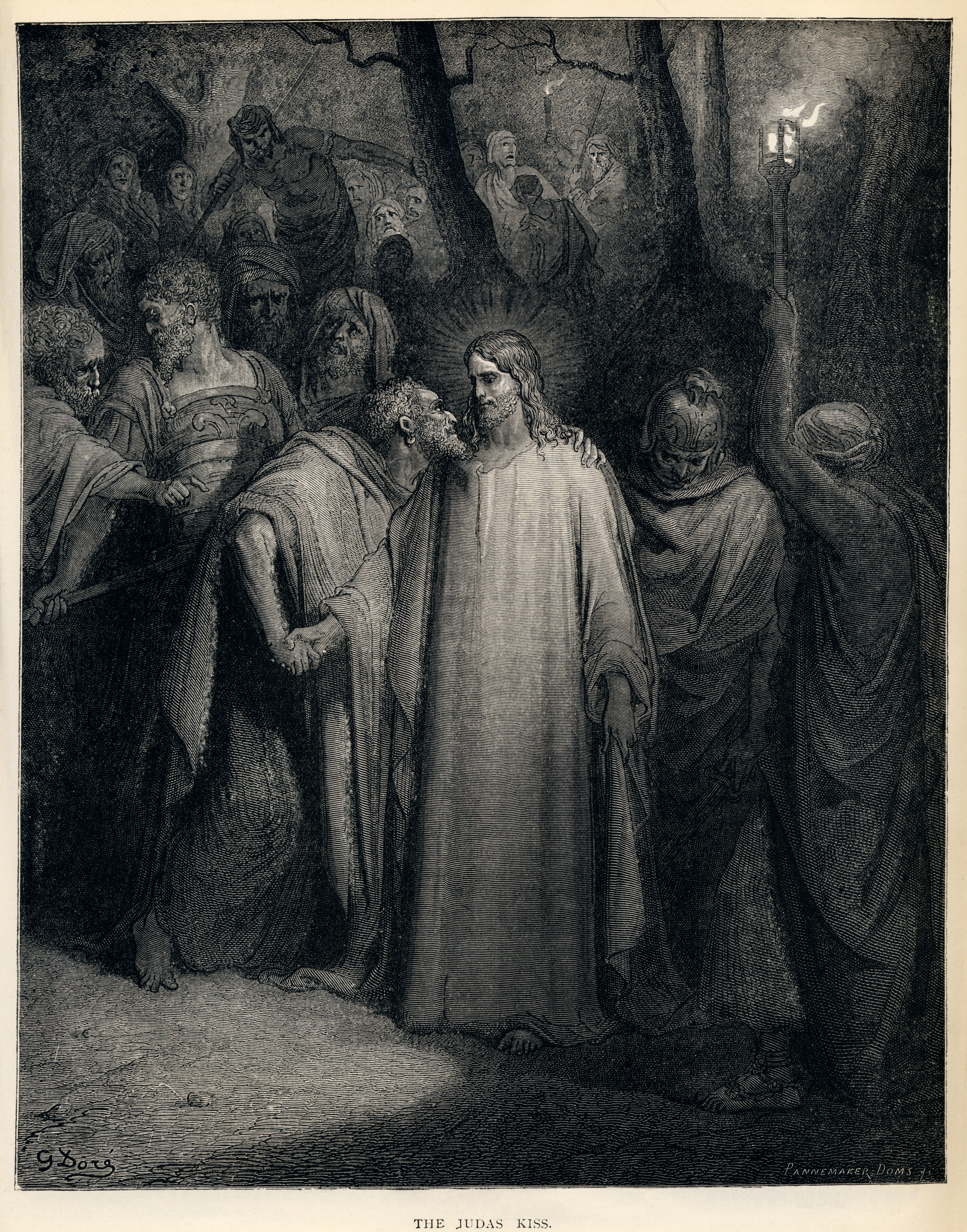
The song's lyrics describe Judas' betrayal of Jesus, depicted here in "The Judas Kiss" (1886) by Gustave Doré.

"Until the End of the World" originated from a guitar riff by vocalist Bono from a demo called "Fat Boy" that the band recorded at STS Studios in 1990, prior to the Achtung Baby sessions proper. Although guitarist the Edge loved the riff, the band struggled to finalise a song from the demo during the album's recording sessions. After the band met with German filmmaker Wim Wenders, who was looking for music to use in his film Until the End of the World, the Edge was inspired to revisit the "Fat Boy" demo. In Dublin, he used the riff to assemble a backing track with bassist Adam Clayton and drummer Larry Mullen Jr. The composition excited the band so much, they decided to include it on the album. They told Wenders, "You can have it but we want it, too", while also informing him that they were using the film title for the song.

According to Jennifer O'Brien of The Times, the lyrics were inspired by a brief falling out that Bono and the Edge had. Bono wrote the lyrics relatively quickly at his father-in-law Terry Stewart's house in Wexford, having woken up with the idea of a conversation between Jesus Christ and Judas Iscariot. Bono had difficulty finding a key he could sing in, as he remarked that he sings most songs "a little bit too high or a little bit too low". Consequently, the only melody he felt comfortable singing was conversational. Reading poetry by John Keats, Percy Bysshe Shelley, and Lord Byron inspired Bono to touch on the theme of temptation in his lyrics.

U2 and their production team expended considerable effort to finalise the song. The band added various overdubs during the recording sessions, including percussion loops by Mullen, as well as a sweeping guitar sound created by their engineer Flood that sounded like it went "between the speakers". Producer Daniel Lanois provided additional percussion, playing congas heard during the song's introduction. At one point, assisting producer Brian Eno believed the additions had negatively impacted the track. Eno, who would occasionally visit the studio and review material for a short amount of time before leaving, believed his distance from the album allowed him to provide a fresh perspective. He explained his assistance: "I'd go in and say, 'The song has gone, whatever it is you liked about this song is not there anymore. Sometimes, for example, the song would have disappeared under layers of overdubs." Eno aided the group in removing some of these overdubs.

== Composition and theme ==
According to Hal Leonard Corporation's sheet music published at Musicnotes.com, "Until the End of the World" is played at a tempo of 101 beats per minute in a 4/4 time signature. The basic key is E major.

David Werther, a faculty associate in Philosophy at the University of Wisconsin–Madison, compared "Until the End of the World" with U2's 1987 song "Exit" in an examination of the role music can play in catharsis. He noted that both were powerful songs, but that while "Until the End of the World" allowed the possibility of purification, which he described as the cleansing of the soul "through pity and fear", by placing the listener in the position of Judas Iscariot, "Exit" was an example of purgation, a freeing from excess pity and fear. Werther noted "'Exit' evokes feelings of fear, fear of losing control, giving into one's dark side, perhaps even taking one's life", contrasting it to the "waves of regret" experienced by Judas.

== Reception ==
Upon the release of Achtung Baby, many critics praised "Until the End of the World". Steve Morse of The Boston Globe thought it was the best song on the album, calling it a "raging rocker" with "fiery bass runs" by Clayton. Morse interpreted some of the lyrics differently from the song's original intent, noting that the lines "We ate the food / We drank the wine / Everybody having a good time / Except you / You were talking about the end of the world" were as if Bono was giving a "terse kiss-off to a former lover at a party". Rolling Stone praised The Edge's guitar playing on the song, noting that "he has always made inspired use of devices like echo and reverb" and "his shimmering washes of color" in the song are instantly recognizable. The Austin Chronicle singled out "Larry Mullen Jr.'s seismic turn" on the song as one of three moments on the record where the band has never sounded better.

Patti Smith reworked the song for the 2011 tribute album AHK-toong BAY-bi Covered. "The punk poet turns in a twilight version…," wrote in Q, "finding dark, bottom-of-the-bottle desperation in its lyrics."

== Live performances ==
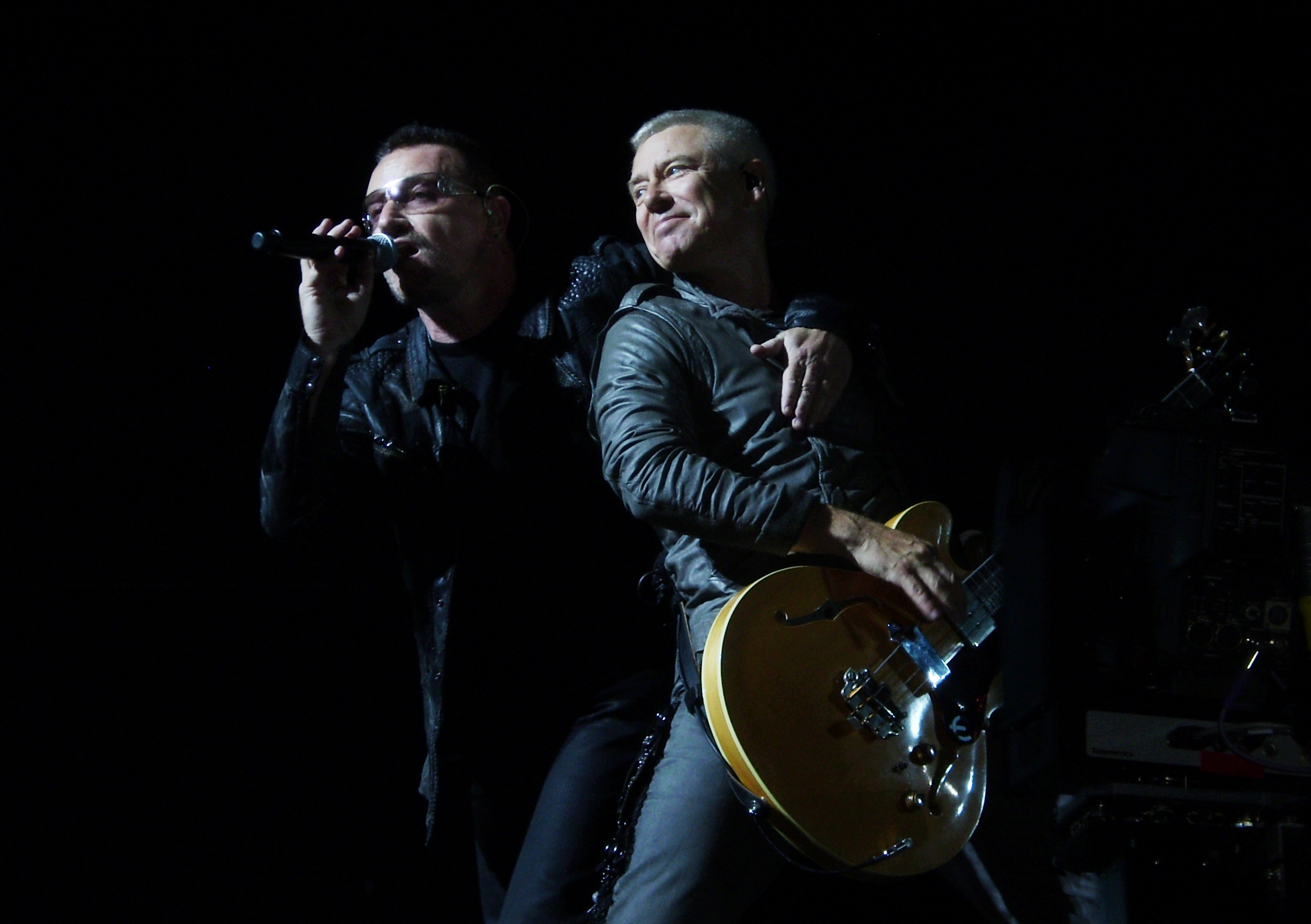
Bono and Adam Clayton during a performance of "Until the End of the World" in Toronto on the U2 360° Tour.

The song is U2's 10th most frequently played song in concerts, and has been played on every U2 tour since it debuted on the 1992-1993 Zoo TV Tour, except for The Joshua Tree Tours 2017 and 2019. The song frequently segues into "New Year's Day". Only until the third leg of the Vertigo Tour in 2005 did it not regularly secure a set list position, having appeared occasionally as a part of the Zoo TV-themed encore. By the fourth and fifth legs in 2006, it secured a regular set position it has occupied on tours past (before "New Year's Day"). It was played at an award ceremony when U2 won for Outstanding Contribution to Music at the Brit Awards 2001, along with "Beautiful Day", "One", and "Mysterious Ways". It was also performed when the band were inducted into the Rock and Roll Hall of Fame in 2005.

On why the song has remained as a live staple despite not being released as a single, the Edge said, "I think it's an amazing song live because it really showcases everything the band does best. In terms of its visceral energy and impact, it's one of those songs that's hard to beat...It's got references to mortality, to all the big questions."

It has appeared on the concert DVD releases Zoo TV: Live from Sydney (1994), PopMart: Live from Mexico City (1998), Elevation 2001: Live from Boston, U2 Go Home: Live from Slane Castle, Ireland (2003), U2360° at the Rose Bowl (2010) and Innocence + Experience: Live in Paris (2016). It also appeared on the CD and DVD versions of The Best of 1990–2000 compilation album in 2002. It was featured (in a different version) on the soundtrack to the film Until the End of the World and also (once again in a different version) in the 1999 film Entropy. A live performance, dedicated to Freddie Mercury, was shown at Wembley Stadium via satellite for The Freddie Mercury Tribute Concert in 1992.

There was a video created for this song which appeared on the 1992 video release Achtung Baby: The Videos, The Cameos, and A Whole Lot of Interference from Zoo TV. However, it was never publicly released. There was also a live video composed of footage from two performances on the "Outside Broadcast" leg of the Zoo TV Tour, from Yankee Stadium and Houston, which appeared on The Best of 1990-2000 DVD.

Edge has always used a Gibson Les Paul to play this song. On the Zoo TV Tour, he used the Les Paul Custom. On the PopMart, Elevation, Vertigo, U2 360° and Innocence + Experience Tours, he has used the Les Paul Standard Goldtop. Although the song was recorded in the key of E, live performances have always been played in a higher key, F♯ on Zoo TV and PopMart, G on all other tours.

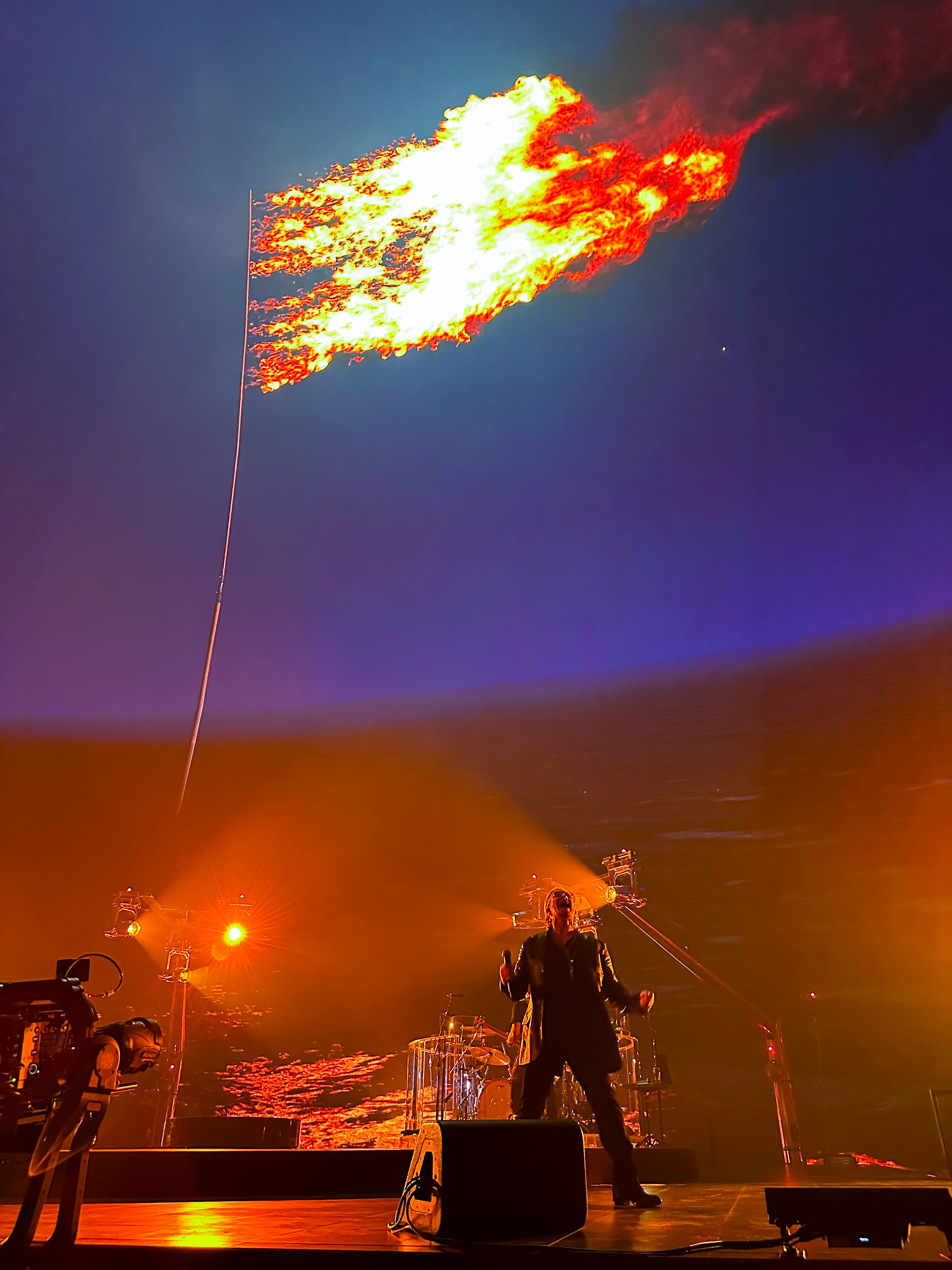
Performances of the song during the band's 2023–2024 concert residency at Sphere featured visuals of weather events and a flare burning in the shape of a flag.

U2 performed "Until the End of the World" during their 2023–2024 U2:UV Achtung Baby Live residency at Sphere in the Las Vegas Valley. During the performances, the venue's LED screen displayed footage of storm clouds, lightning, and rising water. The song culminated with the video art piece "Flare" by John Gerrard, with showed a gas flare burning in the shape of a flag; set in the open ocean, it was meant "to illustrate warming seas and pollution".

== Track listing ==
All lyrics are written by Bono; all music is composed by U2.

U.S. promo (Island PRCD 6704-2)
No.	Title	Length
1.	"Until the End of the World"	4:39

== Credits and personnel ==
- Production – Daniel Lanois with Brian Eno
- Engineering – Flood
- Additional engineering – Robbie Adams
- Assistant engineering – Shannon Strong
- Mixing – Flood and Daniel Lanois
- Mixing assistance – Shannon Strong
- Additional percussion – Daniel Lanois

== Charts ==
Chart (1992)	Peak position
Canada RPM Top 100	69
US Alternative Airplay (Billboard)	4
US Billboard Album Rock Tracks	5
