= Walk On (U2 song) =

2001 single by U2

Single by U2

from the album All That You Can't Leave Behind
- Released: 20 February 2001
- Recorded: 2000
- Studio: HQ (Dublin, Ireland)
- Genre: Rock
- Length: 4:55 (album version); 4:09 (single version); 4:25 (edited version); 4:29 (video version)
- Label: Island; Interscope
- Composer: U2
- Lyricist: Bono
- Producers: Daniel Lanois; Brian Eno; Steve Lillywhite

U2 singles chronology
"Elevation" (2001)	"Walk On" (2001)	"Electrical Storm" (2002)

Music video
- "Walk On" on YouTube

Audio sample
- "Walk On": file; help

"Walk On" is a song by Irish rock band U2. It is the fourth track on their tenth studio album, All That You Can't Leave Behind (2000). The song was first released in Canada on 20 February 2001, then was given a UK release in November of the same year; it was the album's second single in North America and the fourth internationally. The song was written about Burmese academic Aung San Suu Kyi, who was the chairperson of the National League for Democracy and was placed under house arrest from 1989 until 2010 for her pro-democracy activities, which led to the song being banned in Burma.

"Walk On" won the Grammy Award for Record of the Year at the 2002 ceremony, marking the first time an artist had won the award in consecutive years for songs from the same album (following "Beautiful Day"'s win the previous year). In the United States, the song peaked at number 21 on the Adult Top 40 chart, number 19 on the Mainstream Rock chart, and number 10 on the Alternative Songs chart. It also topped the charts in Canada and Portugal, and reached the top 10 in Australia, Belgium, Ireland, the Netherlands, Spain, and on the UK singles chart. It was used as the second credit song to end the broadcast of the 2002 World Series on Fox Sports.

== Writing and composition ==
In March 2000, U2 were awarded the Freedom of the City of Dublin at a ceremony where Burmese academic Aung San Suu Kyi was honoured but absent. The band had never heard of Suu Kyi prior to that but learned that her activism and fighting for freedom in Burma led to her being under house arrest since 1989 (a sentence that was later ended in 2010). Her story inspired U2 lead vocalist Bono for the lyrics to "Walk On".

At first, Bono tried writing from the perspective of Suu Kyi's husband Michael Aris and son Alexander Aris, imagining them living with the pain of not knowing how she was. After he felt that it was too presumptuous, Bono changed the lyrics to be more abstract and to be "a love song about somebody having to leave a relationship for all the right reasons". He said the song was about "nobility and personal sacrifice, about doing what's right, even if your heart is telling you otherwise." In explaining the lyrics, he recalled a Biblical passage in Corinthians that used the image of a house fire to impart the lesson that only eternal things can survive. To Bono, these things were family and friendships, rather than anything material that someone could create. Accordingly, "Walk On" concludes with lyrics describing a "litany of ambitions and achievements" that are expendable, with lines such as "You've got to leave it behind / All that you fashion / All that you make / All that you build / All that you break". Bono described this section as: "a mantra, really, a bonfire of vanities, and you can throw anything you want on the fire. Whatever you want more than love, it has to go." The album All That You Can't Leave Behind's title was derived from the song's lyrics "The only baggage you can bring is all that you can't leave behind." Suu Kyi later told Bono that she liked the song, saying, "it's very close to how I feel".

"Love, in the highest sense of the word, is the only thing that you can always take with you, in your heart. At some point you are going to have to lose everything else anyway."

— Bono talking about the inspiration for the song

As U2 worked on "Walk On" during the recording sessions, they decided to split it into two separate songs: "Walk On" and "Home". The album's producers Brian Eno and Daniel Lanois advised the group that the mix of "Walk On" "was not one to chase", but Bono insisted they continue working on it. Towards the end of the album's recording sessions, the band's long-time producer Steve Lillywhite was hired to make final touches to the songs. After he completed "Beautiful Day", the band played "Walk On" and "Home" for him. Lillywhite told them that "Walk On" had a "fantastic chorus" and "Home" a "great verse"; the band subsequently informed him that they were formerly the same song. Ultimately, under Lillywhite's guidance, the separate songs were fused back together. Bassist Adam Clayton concurred with the decision, saying that each track had great chord progressions but were not great individual songs. Lanois preferred a different version of the song with a more low-key beginning, saying: "When it gets to that stage of making a record, people are looking for songs that the record company can proudly go to radio with. And the ultimate version comes along with a bang, you know. The Edge sounds amazing and it holds so much promise in its first 30 seconds that it's hard to say no to. But the version that I preferred did not have such a slam-bam beginning. So that one got welded and bolted together."

Most of the guitar tone on "Walk On" was achieved by guitarist the Edge playing his white Gibson Les Paul through his Vox AC30 amplifier, while the guitar solo was performed on his Gibson Explorer.

== Release ==
"Walk On" was first issued in Canada on 20 February 2001 as two CD singles. The following month, on 6 March, Interscope Records serviced the track to US hot adult contemporary radio. Island Records subsequently released the single in the UK on 19 November 2001 and in Australia on 3 December 2001. "Walk On" has been re-released in its edit edition for the charity album, Songs for Japan. It was also reworked for the U2 album Songs of Surrender (2023), featuring an acoustic musical arrangement and rewritten lyrics reflecting the Russian invasion of Ukraine in 2022.

=== Controversy ===
The All That You Can't Leave Behind album caused controversy in Burma because "Walk On" was dedicated to Suu Kyi, who was under house arrest for her pro-democracy activities, which led to the album being banned. Democratic Voice of Burma correspondent Myint Maung Maung told British music magazine NME, "The album was banned because it included the song, 'Walk On', which was a dedication to Aung San Suu Kyi and the democracy movement in Burma." Anyone who attempted to import the album, All That You Can't Leave Behind, to Burma could experience a prison sentence lasting between three and twenty years. When the album was released, U2.com had a page addressing attention to the political situation in Burma, where they say 8 million people have been consigned to forced labour and half a million people are the target of ethnic cleansing campaigns.

== Music videos ==
U2 in Rio de Janeiro. Screenshot from the international video.

The first video for "Walk On" - titled "International Version" - was directed by Jonas Åkerlund. Filming took place in November 2000 and was filmed in Rio de Janeiro during U2's two-day promotion there. Some shots, including the band playing with a soccer ball on a beach and the band meeting fans, were improvised and the video was made to be documentary styled. Åkerlund stated it will always be one of his favourite music videos. Later in February 2001, a second video - titled "U.S. version" - was directed by Liz Friedlander and filmed in London. Both were featured on the compilation DVD U218 Videos. In response to Suu Kyi's condoning of 2017 hostilities, the "International Version" of the video on YouTube was edited, replacing a dedication to her at the end with a message in support of Rohingya Muslims in Myanmar.

== Live performances ==
The song's uplifting nature led to it being used frequently to close concerts during U2's 2001 Elevation Tour. The song found added resonance as a supportive, uplifting anthem following the 11 September attacks that year in the United States. The band performed it during the America: A Tribute to Heroes television benefit concert on 21 September 2001. The first performance of the song for a live audience following the 11 September attacks was at the University of Notre Dame on 10 October 2001, where the band brought on stage members of the New York City Police and Fire Departments. Live versions of the song were released on the concert films Elevation 2001: Live from Boston, U2 Go Home: Live from Slane Castle, Ireland (2003), and U2360° at the Rose Bowl (2010). During the 2005-2006 Vertigo Tour, it appeared rarely, usually in an acoustic format. It was snippeted after "Running to Stand Still" on the Vertigo Tour at the dates closest to 19 June, the birthday of Aung San Suu Kyi.

The song was a regular part of the set list for the 2009-2011 U2 360° Tour. Prior to the tour, the band asked fans to bring masks of Suu Kyi to concerts and wear them during performances of "Walk On" in support of her. In some cities such as Hanover, Barcelona, Coimbra and Istanbul, Amnesty International and ONE volunteers went on stage and lined the outer perimeter of it during U2's performance of the song, carrying either Suu Kyi masks or Amnesty International lanterns.

In June 2012, Bono performed the song live for Suu Kyi during the Electric Burma concert in Dublin in her honour. In 2017, the song took new meaning after Suu Kyi's silence on the genocide of Rohingya Muslims. Bono has stated that he has been "nauseated" by Suu Kyi's stance on the issue, the band issued a release condemning her actions, and following performances of "Walk On" have instead dedicated the song to Rohingya Muslims.

== Critical reception ==
At the 44th Annual Grammy Awards ceremony in 2002, "Walk On" was nominated for two awards: Record of the Year and Best Rock Song. It won for Record of the Year, marking the first time an artist had won the award for songs from the same album in consecutive years; the prior year, U2's song "Beautiful Day" had won the award. At the 45th Annual Grammy Awards in 2003, U2's performance of "Walk On" for the America: A Tribute to Heroes benefit was nominated for Best Rock Performance by a Duo or Group with Vocal. In 2002, "Walk On" won the Ivor Novello Award for Best Song Musically and Lyrically, as well as a Meteor Music Award for Best Irish Rock Single.

== Formats and track listings ==
Island 3145728192. Canada. Cover: full colour
No.	Title	Lyrics	Music	Length
1.	"Walk On" (Edited version)	Bono	U2	4:23
2.	"Beautiful Day" (Live on Farmclub.com)	Bono	U2	4:45
3.	"New York" (Live on Farmclub.com)	Bono	U2	5:59

Island 3145728202. Canada. Cover: grey
No.	Title	Lyrics	Music	Length
1.	"Walk On" (Edited version)	Bono	U2	4:23
2.	"Big Girls Are Best"	Bono, The Edge	U2	3:34
3.	"Beautiful Day" (Quincey and Sonance remix)	Bono	U2	7:56

Island CID788 / 588 840-2. UK and Australia. Cover: red
No.	Title	Lyrics	Music	Length
1.	"Walk On" (Video version)	Bono	U2	4:29
2.	"Where the Streets Have No Name" (Live in Boston, Massachusetts)	Bono	U2	6:02
3.	"Stay (Faraway, So Close!)" (Live in Toronto, Ontario, Canada)	Bono	U2	5:39
4.	"Gone" (Live in Boston, Massachusetts) (Australian bonus track)	Bono, The Edge	U2	5:04

Island CIDX788 / 588 846-2. UK and Australia. Enhanced CD edition. Cover: blue
No.	Title	Lyrics	Music	Length
1.	"Walk On" (Single version)	Bono	U2	4:11
2.	"Stuck in a Moment You Can't Get Out Of" (Acoustic version)	Bono, The Edge	U2	3:42
3.	"Stuck in a Moment You Can't Get Out Of" (Video)	Bono, The Edge	U2	4:36
4.	"Elevation" (Vandit club mix) (Australian bonus track)	Bono	U2	8:54

Island CIDT788 / 588 839-2. Europe. Cover: grey/pink
No.	Title	Lyrics	Music	Length
1.	"Walk On" (Video version)	Bono	U2	4:28
2.	"Stuck in a Moment You Can't Get Out Of" (Acoustic version)	Bono, The Edge	U2	3:42

Island CIDV788 / 588 839-9. DVD single. Cover: green
No.	Title	Lyrics	Music	Length
1.	"Walk On" (Single version)	Bono	U2	4:11
2.	"4 x 30s Clips from Elevation 2001 DVD"			2:01
3.	"Walk On" (Video)	Bono	U2	4:54

== Personnel ==
- Bono – lead vocals
- The Edge – guitar, backing vocals, piano
- Adam Clayton – bass guitar
- Larry Mullen Jr. – drums

== Charts ==
=== Weekly charts ===
Weekly chart performance for "Walk On"
Chart (2001–2002)	Peak position
Australia (ARIA)	9
Austria (Ö3 Austria Top 40)	33
Belgium (Ultratip Bubbling Under Flanders)	6
Belgium (Ultratip Bubbling Under Wallonia)	3
Canada (Nielsen SoundScan)	1
Denmark (Tracklisten)	12
Europe (Eurochart Hot 100)	17
Finland (Suomen virallinen lista)	16
France (SNEP)	81
Germany (GfK)	54
Ireland (IRMA)	7
Italy (FIMI)	36
Netherlands (Dutch Top 40)	10
Netherlands (Single Top 100)	8
Norway (VG-lista)	17
Portugal (AFP)	1
Spain (Promusicae)	2
Sweden (Sverigetopplistan)	55
Switzerland (Schweizer Hitparade)	48
UK Singles (Official Charts)	5
US Bubbling Under Hot 100 (Billboard)	18
US Adult Alternative Airplay (Billboard)	2
US Adult Pop Airplay (Billboard)	21
US Alternative Airplay (Billboard)	10
US Mainstream Rock (Billboard)	19

=== Year-end charts ===
Year-end chart performance for "Walk On"
Chart (2001)	Position
Canada (Nielsen SoundScan)	10
Canada Radio (Nielsen BDS)	62
US Adult Top 40 (Billboard)	61
US Modern Rock Tracks (Billboard)	56
US Triple-A (Billboard)	14

== Release history ==
Release-dates and formats for "Walk On"
Region	Date	Format(s)	Label(s)	Ref.
Canada	20 February 2001	CD	Island	
United States	26 March 2001	Hot adult contemporary radio	Interscope	
United Kingdom	19 November 2001	CD; DVD	Island	
Australia	3 December 2001	CD	Island	
