= New York (U2 song) =

2000 song by U2

Song by U2

from the album All That You Can't Leave Behind
- Released: 2000
- Genre: Rock, alternative rock
- Length: 5:31
- Label: Island / Interscope
- Composer: U2
- Lyricist: Bono
- Producers: Brian Eno, Daniel Lanois

"New York" is the tenth track from U2's 2000 album, All That You Can't Leave Behind. It is notable as the subject matter is a picturesque description of New York City and of the people who live there, and was later altered following the events of September 11, 2001. The song's lyrics were written by lead singer Bono, who has a residence in New York City.

== Writing and recording ==
"New York" originated from a drum pattern developed by drummer Larry Mullen Jr. during downtime between writing and recording All That You Can't Leave Behind. The members of U2 liked it but had difficulty finding a song into which they could incorporate it. At the request of Mullen, their recording engineer created a loop of the pattern. While the band were stuck in a long meeting upstairs in the studio, producers Brian Eno and Daniel Lanois continued to work on music downstairs. Eno cued up Mullen's drum loop and added "fog horn" sounds over it, while Lanois developed guitar chords. When the band's meeting concluded, they returned to the studio and were inspired by what they heard. They added their own instrumentals in a jam session, while lead singer Bono developed vocals at the microphone. Lanois said that the song came together very quickly and was a good example of the producers' creative process with U2: "I think we work best like that: Eno and I provide the sonics for the band, they come in and respond to the invitation." Bassist Adam Clayton said that like many of the group's songs, the jam recording was subsequently edited into a song arrangement that they learned to play. During the guitar-heavy sections of the song, guitarist the Edge used a Japanese effects unit by Sobatt; he described it as: "so extreme. You step on it and all hell breaks loose."

Bono has stated that the song is a tribute of sorts to both Frank Sinatra and Lou Reed. "There was a verse about Lou Reed, that didn't make it, and a verse about Frank Sinatra (that also didn't make it). And Lou has an album called New York, and he mentions my name on one of the tracks, "Beginning of a Great Adventure". And I just think he is to New York what James Joyce was to Dublin." In another interview, Bono elaborated further on the song's theme of "mid-life crisis": "There used to be a verse at the end about Frank Sinatra, because if I was going to be singing about New York, New York, I felt like I should. It went "When I'm down on my luck / I sometimes think of Frank Sinatra / I met him once / He was more than generous / At dinner one evening he found a blue paper napkin ... and he stared at it and said to no one in particular, I remember when my eyes were this blue." Which is how the song ended. ... But I took out that scene because I didn't want people to think the song was autobiographical—you know, I did that song with him and everything (on Duets)."

== Live performances ==
U2 has played the song "New York" live 120 times. The song debuted on 19 October 2000 at the ManRay club in Paris, as part of a promotional concert for the October 30 release of All That You Can't Leave Behind. Following the events of 11 September 2001, several lyrics were altered in subsequent live performances. The song has not been played since the end of the Elevation Tour, with the last performance taking place on 2 December 2001.

A live version is included on the DVD Elevation 2001: Live from Boston.
