= Kite (U2 song) =

2000 song by U2

Song by U2

from the album All That You Can't Leave Behind
- Released: 30 October 2000
- Genre: Rock
- Length: 4:23
- Label: Island, Interscope
- Composer: U2
- Lyricists: Bono and the Edge
- Producers: Daniel Lanois and Brian Eno

Audio sample
- "Kite": file; help

"Kite" is a song by Irish rock band U2. It is the fifth track on their 2000 album All That You Can't Leave Behind.

== Writing and recording ==
For three weeks in late 1998, U2 worked at Hanover Quay Studios with producers Brian Eno and Daniel Lanois in hopes of quickly developing new material for a studio album, which would become All That You Can't Leave Behind. With Eno on keyboards and Lanois on rhythm guitar and percussion, the six of them composed songs during jam sessions. Guitarist the Edge said that these group sessions did not produce many great ideas, resulting in him bringing in his own individual musical ideas for them to work on. One of these was a loop of a string section that inspired "Kite". After hearing the loop, the others quickly improvised the entirety of the song. During this process, lead singer Bono said his "voice returned" after several years of him suffering vocal difficulties. After hitting a high note when singing the line "I'm a man, I'm not a child", the others in the studio were taken aback. Bassist Adam Clayton called it a "memorable moment", saying, "I don't think we had heard that voice for a long time." With the song near completion, the band was not entirely satisfied and decided it "needed a twist". As a result, they edited in an additional section of the song and the Edge played a guitar solo on his 1964 Gretsch Country Gentleman, which he plugged into an Ampeg Scrambler distortion pedal and a Vox AC30 amplifier. According to him, the addition of the solo "really made that part of the song come alive".

The lyrics were inspired by a kite-flying outing on Killiney Hill overlooking Dublin Bay that Bono attempted with his daughters Jordan and Eve Hewson. The outing went quickly awry when the kite crashed and Eve asked if they could go home and play with their Tamagotchis. The Edge assisted Bono in writing the lyrics and felt they were actually about Bono's emotionally-reserved father, Bob Hewson, who was dying of cancer at the time. The Edge said, "[Bono] couldn't see it, but I could." Bono recalled a similarly ill-fated kite-flying outing in his own childhood with his father in the County Dublin seaside towns of Skerries or Rush.

== Composition and theme ==
The song was at first written with Bono's daughters Jordan and Eve in mind, or more generally, about a kite as a metaphor for someone or something escaping one's realm of control; the song is, more or less, about Bono realizing a day will come when his daughters will "no longer need him". During early promotional appearances Bono emphasized the song could be about letting go of any kind of relationship.

The music to "Kite" was equally evocative. The song begins with a string loop that the Edge had arranged. The verses feature the Edge playing a simple repeating slide guitar piece, while the chorus featuring an emphatic wail from Bono set against the Edge's churning guitar lines. The song concludes with an odd coda in reference to the new media. In concert the coda is sometimes repeated, with almost all instrumentation dropped out; Bono later said the coda was intended to pinpoint the narrative by "just setting it in time, saying that's the moment, and then leaving it behind you."

As is often the case with U2 songs, listeners heard various things from "Kite". Rolling Stone magazine saw it describing "the plight of a fraying couple; when Bono glimpses 'the shadow behind your eyes,' his lyric evokes the music's slanted conversations of melody and rhythm and guitar figures." The New York Times entitled their review of an Elevation Tour concert "Like a Kite, Grounded But Soaring to the Skies", and said the song was "music made after the fall," merging idealism with experience. A United Methodist Pastor in McGregor, Texas took the song's lines "I'm not afraid to die / I'm not afraid to live" and related it to his belief that Christians should not think of God as a stern judge and should not be afraid to live to the fullest, while a London memorial service honoring The Door magazine founder and religious figure Mike Yaconelli used it as the spiritual pivot of the service. Author Višnja Cogan partially echoed Edge's interpretation, seeing the duality of Bono's role as both father and son embodied in the song's interior climax "I'm a man, I'm not a child...."

== Live performances ==
During the band's Elevation Tour, "Kite" was played to a set of swirling images projected against a scrim above the stage, furthering the song's central theme. "Kite" took on an additional meaning later in 2001 on the tour, when Bono's father, Bob Hewson, died after a long bout with cancer. Bono would alter the line "The last of the rock stars" to "The last of the opera stars", a reference to Bob's past as an amateur opera singer. Bono paid tribute to him with a tearful rendition of this song on the 2003 live release, U2 Go Home: Live from Slane Castle, Ireland, which depicts the band's memorable performance at Slane Castle, one day after Bob Hewson's funeral. Prior to the song, Bono fondly recalls his father and the Edge's father, Garvin Evans, walking down Madison Avenue late-night in New York City drunk together and singing "the duet from The Silver Fish".

"Kite" was played for the first time on the Vertigo Tour on 7 November 2006 in Brisbane, Australia, when the tour resumed after a long hiatus. It was also the first time that "Kite" has closed a concert, and was the regular closer on the Australian leg of the tour, while it also closed the first show in Auckland, New Zealand. A live version of the song from the Vertigo Tour, recorded in Sydney's Telstra Stadium on 11 November 2006, was released as a B-side to "Window in the Skies" on 1 January 2007. The live Australian version featured the use of didgeridoo (especially audible toward the end). The song has not been played since the Vertigo Tour but was rehearsed during the U2 360° Tour before the 2011 South African shows.

== Personnel ==
U2

- Bono – lead vocals
- The Edge – guitar, strings, backing vocals
- Adam Clayton – bass guitar
- Larry Mullen, Jr. – drums

Additional performers

- Brian Eno – backing vocals
- Daniel Lanois – backing vocals

Technical

- Production – Brian Eno, Daniel Lanois
- Mixing and engineering – Richard Rainey, Chris Heaney
