= Man Ray (bar) =

Restaurant-bar in Paris, France

Coordinates: 48.8693°N 2.3050°E

The Man Ray bar was a restaurant-bar in Paris, France. It is named after the artist Man Ray.

A former cinema, the bar was once part-owned by American actors Johnny Depp, Sean Penn and John Malkovich, and was located at 34 Rue Marbeuf (near the Champs-Élysées). It was managed by Thierry Klemeniuk. The club has since been renamed "World Place", comprising the Lobster Cafe, The Lounge and The Club. This trendier cousin of the Buddha Bar, with a similar neo-Asian décor, changed its name to Mandalaray in 2005.

== Man Ray music ==
The following are all currently released Man Ray bar compilation CDs:

- Man Ray, Vol. 1
- Man Ray, Vol. 2
- Man Ray, Vol. 3
