= Goat Fashion =

London-based women's clothing label

Goat Fashion is a London based womenswear label. It was founded in 2001 by Jane Lewis as a small range of tailored separates and knits using cashmere, wool and silk yarns and has grown into a complete ready-to-wear collection. The brand is stocked by boutiques and stores predominantly in the UK. The Goat trademark was sold in 2020 and in 2021 Goat Fashion rebranded to Jane, named after the Founder and Creative Director Jane Lewis.

== Fans ==
Celebrity clients of the label include the Duchess of Cambridge, Victoria Beckham and Lana Del Rey.

=== Company timeline ===
- 2012 – Goat received the backing of Private Equity fund Amery Capital
- 2012 – Goat launched an e commerce site
- 2013 – Goat was named as one of the eight selected businesses for the Walpole Luxury Brands of the Future programme
- 2013 – in August, Goat invested in a London-wide billboard campaign
- 2020 – the Goat trademark was sold.
- 2021 – the company rebranded to Jane and the website changed to JaneAtelier.com.

== See also ==
- CuteCircuit
- Anna Valentine
- Finery (company)
