= Pantograph (disambiguation) =

A pantograph is a mechanical connected linkage of a writing instrument, like a pen, such that the movement of one pen, in tracing an image, produces identical movements in a second pen.

Pantograph may also refer to:

- Pantograph (lighting suspension), an overhead lighting system used in television and photography
- Pantograph punch, a type of keypunch used in early data processing machines
- Pantograph (rail), a device that collects electric current from overhead lines for electric trains or trams
- Pantographia, a 1799 work on writing systems and typography by Edmund Fry
- Pantographic knife, a folding knife whose blade is opened by a unique scissors method
- Delay differential equation, also known as a “pantograph equation”
- Void pantograph, a method of security printing aimed at foiling photographic duplication

== See also ==
- The Pantagraph, a daily newspaper that serves Bloomington-Normal, Illinois, United States
