= CuteCircuit =

British fashion company

- Founded: 2004
- Founders: Francesca Rosella and Ryan Genz
- Headquarters: London, United Kingdom
- Website: www.cutecircuit.com

CuteCircuit (/ˌkjuːtˈsɜːrkɪt/ KYOOT-SUR-kit) is a fashion company based in London founded in 2004 by Ryan Genz and Francesca Rosella. CuteCircuit designs wearable technology and interactive fashion.

All CuteCircuit garments are designed by Francesca Rosella and Ryan Genz.

CuteCircuit was the first fashion company offering smart textile-based garments that create an emotional experience for their wearers using smart textiles and micro electronics. With the launch of the first collection in 2004, design critic John Thackara referred to Francesca Rosella as "The Madonna of wearable computing".

The transformational creations from CuteCircuit have been cited as being an inspiration and precursor to the work of other avant-garde designers such as the Hussein Chalayan. The garments have been worn by celebrities including Irina Shayk, Fergie, Katy Perry.

== Collections ==
=== Projects ===
Kinetic Dress
The Kinetic Dress designed by CuteCircuit in 2004. It represents an interaction between garment and wearer's activities and mood; it lights up and changes its patterns following the person's movement .

Hug Shirt
The Hug Shirt, a T-shirt that recreates the sensation of touch, warmth and emotion of a hug from the distant one using haptic actuators.

The Hug Shirt was awarded as one of the Best Inventions of The Year by Time magazine in 2006 and also awarded with the First Prize at Ciberart Conference in Bilbao, Spain. In 2009, it was showcased by UK Trade & Investment (UKTI) at the Mobile World Congress.

The Hug Shirt uses embedded actuators within the fabric to reproduce the sensation of touch, enabling "touch telecommunication." It connects wirelessly to a mobile device via the HugShirt App, allowing users to send and receive virtual hugs. The shirt is both rechargeable and washable, making it a reusable garment. It does not contain internal wiring, and the materials used are Oeko-Tex certified. The Hug Shirt connects emotion, and physical touch with computing and technology. It shows a positive way technology can benefit Humans.

M Dress
In 2008 CuteCircuit designed the M Dress that accepts a standard SIM card and allows to make and receive calls anytime, everywhere, without having to carry a cellular phone.

Galaxy Dress
It is the world's largest wearable LED display (24,000 full colour LEDs). The Galaxy Dress is the center piece of the "Fast Forward: Inventing the Future" exhibit at the Museum of Science and Industry in Chicago. TshirtOS
Designed by CuteCircuit in partnership with Ballantine's, tshirtOS is the world's first wearable, sharable, programmable T-shirt, that can be programmed by an iOS app to show images and texts, play music, take photos and share them with everybody.

CuteCircuit designs dresses and costumes for international artist special performances or tours. Such as, Katy Perry's catsuit for her performance in American Idol, U2 leather jackets for their U2 360 Tour, Laura Pausini four and a half meters skirt for her Inedito World Tour or Azerbaijani representative for Eurovision Song Contest 2010 Safura Alizadeh dress.

Graphene Dress

The Graphene Dress created by CuteCircuit and Manchester’s National Graphene Institute, being unveiled in 2017. The dress uses graphene which is an incredibly thin and conductive material. The graphene allows power to the LEDs. The dress measures the wearer’s breathing with a stretch sensor and changes the colour of the LEDs based on that data.

The SoundShirt

The SoundShirt is a shirt that listens for sound in the wearer's environment. It then uses 28 haptic actuators, to replicate that sound across the wearer's body.

=== Prêt-à-Porter and Haute Couture ===
CuteCircuit product line is formed by the Prêt-à-Porter Collection, the Haute Couture Collection and special tailored pieces for private customers and celebrities.

The Prêt-à-Porter Collection includes fashionable pieces made of laser cut reflective materials, 3-D digital print and smart textiles. They have redesigned their haute couture pieces for the prêt-à-porter market; for example, the K Dress inspired by Katy Perry's dress for Met Gala 2010 was the first interactive fashion garment to be featured in Selfridges womenswear department.

More recently CuteCircuit has launched the World's First Couture Twitter Dress, an evening dress worn for the first time by Nicole Scherzinger which is able to receive and show tweets sent in real time by fans.

Mirror Handbag

The Mirror Handbag, developed by CuteCircuit, is able to display tweets on the side of the bag. This is similar to the Couture Twitter Dress dress also made by CuteCircuit. In January 2018, more than 100 Mirror Handbags were sold.

== Awards and exhibitions ==
CuteCircuit is featured in numerous books and publications such as "100 Ideas that Changed Fashion", "World Changing" edited by Alex Steffen with a foreword by Al Gore, "Fashioning the Future" by Suzanne Lee, "Fashionable Technology: The Intersection of Design, Fashion, Science, and Technology" by Sabine Seymour, "Smart Materials in Architecture, Interior Architecture and Design by Axel Ritter", "Interior Architecture and Design", "Sex Design" and "Designing for Interaction".

Many of CuteCircuit products have also been published in magazines and newspapers, such as Huffington Post, Time, Elle, Design Matters, Stuff, Wired, The Daily Telegraph, The Times, The Financial Times, Fashionology and CuteCircuit was featured in Surface for the Avantguardian special issue covering the "American Avant Garde"

CuteCircuit products and interviews have been featured on BBC "The next generation of wearable tech", BBC Global India, BBC Arabia, Channel 4 "Home of the Future", Discovery Channel International, Channel 5 "The Gadget Show", National Geographic Television, BBC World Technology, BBC Live at Five, BBC Go-Digital, National Japanese Television, and Current TV.

Its work has been exhibited at the NEMO Science Museum in Amsterdam, SIGGRAPH, Design and Emotion Conference, International Symposium of Wearable Computing, 'How Smart are We?' Symposium at RIBA, 'Tomorrow's Textiles' at the Science Museum in London, Test_Lab: Fashionable Technology at the Institute for the Unstable Media in Rotterdam, Gravity Free 2008 and Fast Forward...Inventing the Future in Chicago's Museum of Science and Industry, INKtalks 2012 conference in India, MindTrek 2009 conference in Finland, Connected Body at Picnic Festival in Amsterdam, Techno Threads at the Science Gallery in Dublin, IDMAa Conference, The Mobile World Congress, Ethical Fashion Show, Smart Fabrics/Interactive Textiles SFIT in Washington, Nordic Exceptional Trendshop in Denmark and at WIRED NextFest for two consecutive years in New York City and Los Angeles.
