= Fining =

Fining may refer to:

- Finings, additives to beer or wine, see also fining
- Fining, metallurgy process done in a finery forge
- Fining, glass production process, also called refining

== See also ==
- Fine (disambiguation)
- Finery (disambiguation)
