= U2 360° Tour =

2009–11 concert tour by U2

- World tour by U2
- Tour logo
- Location: Europe; North America; Oceania; Africa; South America
- Associated album: No Line on the Horizon
- Start date: 30 June 2009
- End date: 30 July 2011
- Legs: 7
- No. of shows: 111
- Attendance: 7.3 million
- Box office: US$736.4 million

U2 concert chronology
- Vertigo Tour (2005–2006); U2 360° Tour (2009–2011); Innocence + Experience Tour (2015)

The U2 360° Tour was a worldwide concert tour by the Irish rock band U2. Staged in support of the group's 2009 album No Line on the Horizon, the tour visited stadiums from 2009 through 2011. The concerts featured the band playing "in the round" on a circular stage, allowing the audience to surround them on all sides. To accommodate the stage configuration, a large four-legged structure nicknamed "The Claw" was built above the stage, with the sound system and a cylindrical, expanding video screen on top of it. At 164 feet (50 m) tall, it was the largest stage ever constructed. U2 claimed that the tour would be "the first time a band has toured in stadiums with such a unique and original structure."

In an era of declining music sales, analysts expected U2 360° to be a major source of income for the band. Every date of the tour sold out, many within minutes of tickets going on sale. To accommodate the time required to assemble and transport "The Claw" between tour dates, three separate stage structures were required on tour. The 360-degree production increased the capacity of venues by up to 25%, leading to attendance records at over 60 venues. Various themes were incorporated into the shows; portions of the concerts featured outer space themes, due to "The Claw's" resemblance to a spaceship. Pre-recorded messages from the International Space Station were displayed during the shows, as were sociopolitical statements from Desmond Tutu and Aung San Suu Kyi. The setlists were adjusted for each year of the tour; for the 2010 shows, unreleased songs were debuted live, while for 2011 legs, the group performed more 1990s songs to mark the 20th anniversary of the release of Achtung Baby.

Comprising three legs and 111 shows, the tour began on 30 June 2009 in Barcelona, Spain, and concluded on 30 July 2011 in Moncton, New Brunswick. It twice visited Europe and North America, while making stops in South America, Africa, and Oceania. The 2010 North American leg of the tour was postponed until the following year after lead vocalist Bono suffered a serious back injury. U2 won Billboard Touring Awards for Top Tour and Top Draw of 2010 and 2011, and for Top Boxscore at a single venue in 2009 for shows at Croke Park in Dublin. A 2009 show at the Rose Bowl in Pasadena, California was filmed for the concert video U2360° at the Rose Bowl and was streamed live over YouTube; the concert set a new US attendance record for a single headlining act. The tour was generally well received by critics and fans. By its conclusion, U2 360° had set records for the highest-grossing concert tour with $736 million in ticket sales and the highest-attended tour with over 7.3 million tickets sold; both records stood until 2019.

== Conception and stage design ==
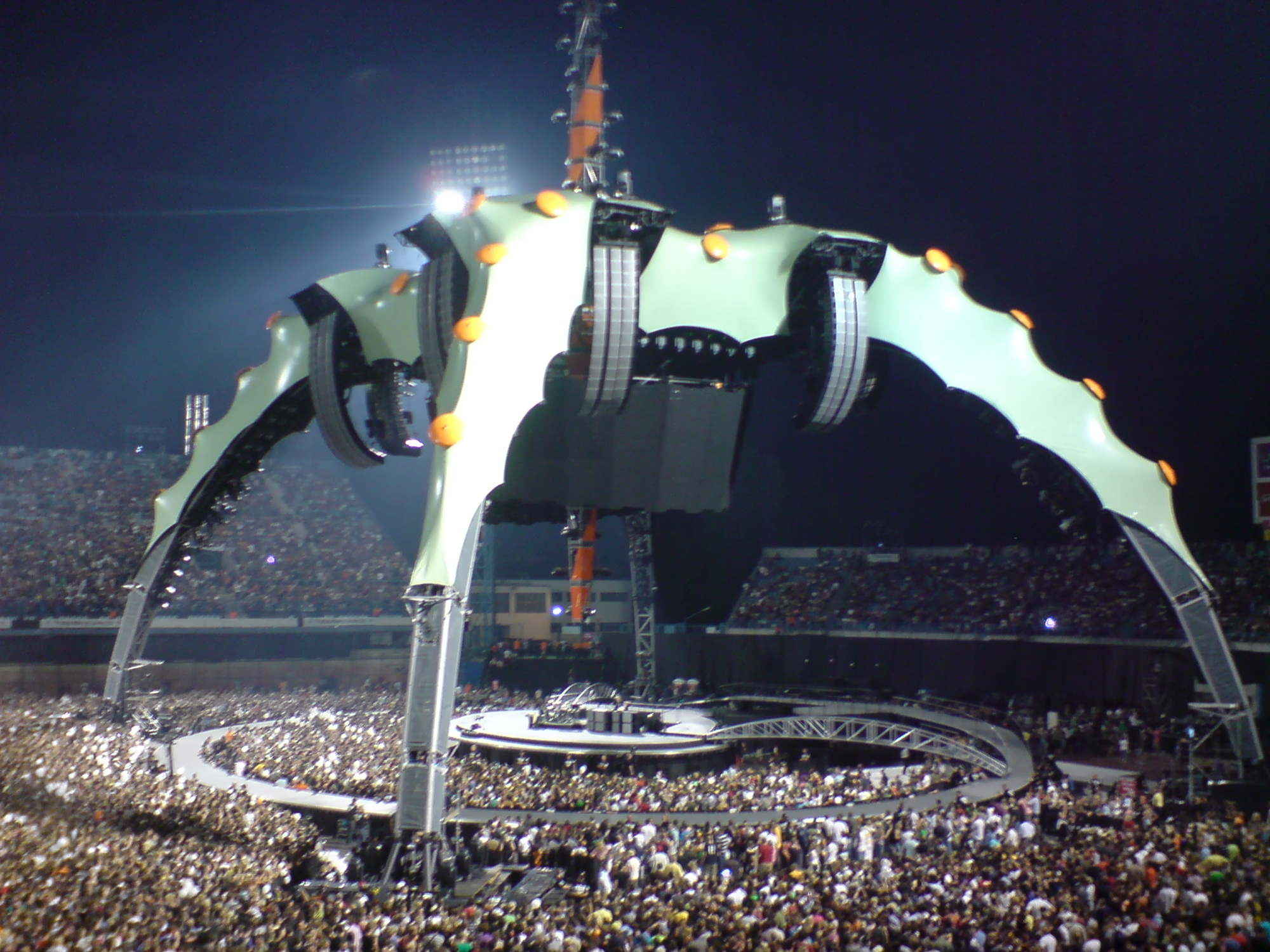
The stage was surrounded by the audience and featured a claw-like supporting rig.

Willie Williams, who has worked on every U2 tour since the 1982–1983 War Tour, was again a designer for this tour; Mark Fisher served as the architect. Williams had been toying with ideas for 360-degree stadium staging for U2 for a number of years, and presented sketches of a four-legged design to the group near the end of their Vertigo Tour in 2006. The inspiration for the "spaceship-on-four-legs" design, nicknamed "the Claw", came from the landmark Theme Building at Los Angeles International Airport. Early reports referred to it as the Kiss the Future Tour, though the name was later changed.

The tour featured a 360-degree configuration, with the stage being placed closer to the center of the stadium's field than usual. The stage design featured a large four-legged steel structure that held the speaker system and cylindrical video screen and hovered above the performance area. The stage was surrounded by a circular ramp, which connected to the stage by rotating bridges. Fans with general admission tickets could be placed both outside the ramp as well as between the ramp and stage. The stage had no defined front or back and was surrounded by the audience. The stage design was able to increase the venues' capacities by about 15–20%. Tiered football stadiums were preferred venues in this scheme, compared to flat fields or baseball stadiums, although a few of the latter added to the routing. As with many large-scale tours of its era, the U2 360° Tour had both the workforce and the revenues associated with a medium-sized company.

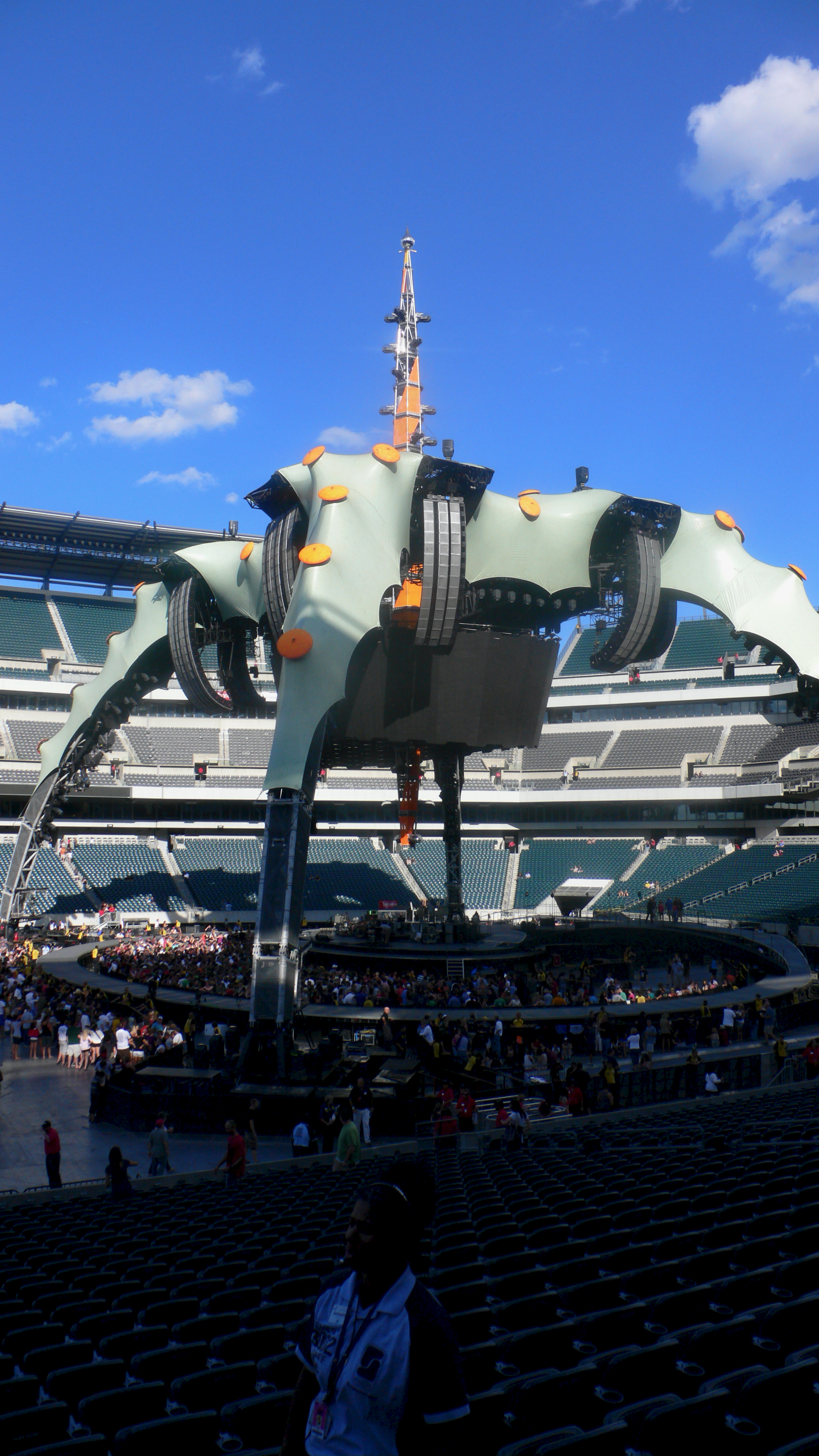
A spire on top added to the stage's height.

The stages were built by the Belgian company Stageco along with the U.S.-based company Enerpac. Each stage deployed high-pressure, state-of-the-art hydraulic systems. These were used for the first time ever to assemble and dismantle the high-tonnage structure. Stageco designed a unique system, based on Enerpac's Synchronous Lift System, to raise the modular construction to a height of 30 metres in an efficient and effective manner.

The steel structure was 51 metres (167 feet) tall (doubling the size of the stadium set for The Rolling Stones' A Bigger Bang Tour, the previous record holder), was able to hold up to 200 tonnes underneath it, and required 120 trucks to transport each of the three sets constructed to support the tour. Each leg of the structure contained its own sound system. The cost of each structure was between £15 million and £20 million ($23 million and $31 million, respectively). As a result, the tour was heavily insured. The size of the stage led to some problems with its construction in certain venues. The band paid $2 million to raise the HD video screen in Cowboys Stadium for their concert in Arlington, and paid $3 million to expand the Hippodrome de Montréal into a temporary stadium for their concert in Montreal. The 360° tour crew consisted of 137 touring production crew supplemented by over 120 hired locally. Daily costs of the production were approximately $750,000, not including the stage construction; the majority of this came from truck rentals, transportation, and staff wages. The tour was not expected to break even until the conclusion of the second leg.

The show is an unlikely fusion of the two extremes of U2's tours – the technological overload of 1992-93's Zoo TV and the no-frills, bare-stage Elevation Tour.

— Brian Hiatt, of Rolling Stone

When the tour was announced, U2 guitarist The Edge said of the show's design: "It's hard to come up with something that's fundamentally different, but we have, I think, on this tour. Where we're taking our production will never have been seen before by anybody, and that's an amazing thing to be able to say. For a band like U2 that really thrives on breaking new ground, it's a real thrill." Lead singer Bono said the design was intended to overcome the staid traditional appearance of outdoor concerts where the stage was dominated by speaker stacks on either side: "We have some magic, and we've got some beautiful objects we're going to take around the world, and we're inside that object." He also said that the group's goal was for the show to not be too choreographed. Williams said the goal is to establish a physical proximity: "The band is just sitting in the palm of the audience's hand." At the conclusion of the tour, the intent was to leave the three structures in different parts of the globe and turn them into permanent concert venues. An auction of the stages was planned following the last concert. In April 2018, it was announced that the Loveland Living Planet Aquarium in Utah had reached a deal to permanently install one of the claw stages on its expanded campus; the structure was planned to be fully assembled by July 2019.

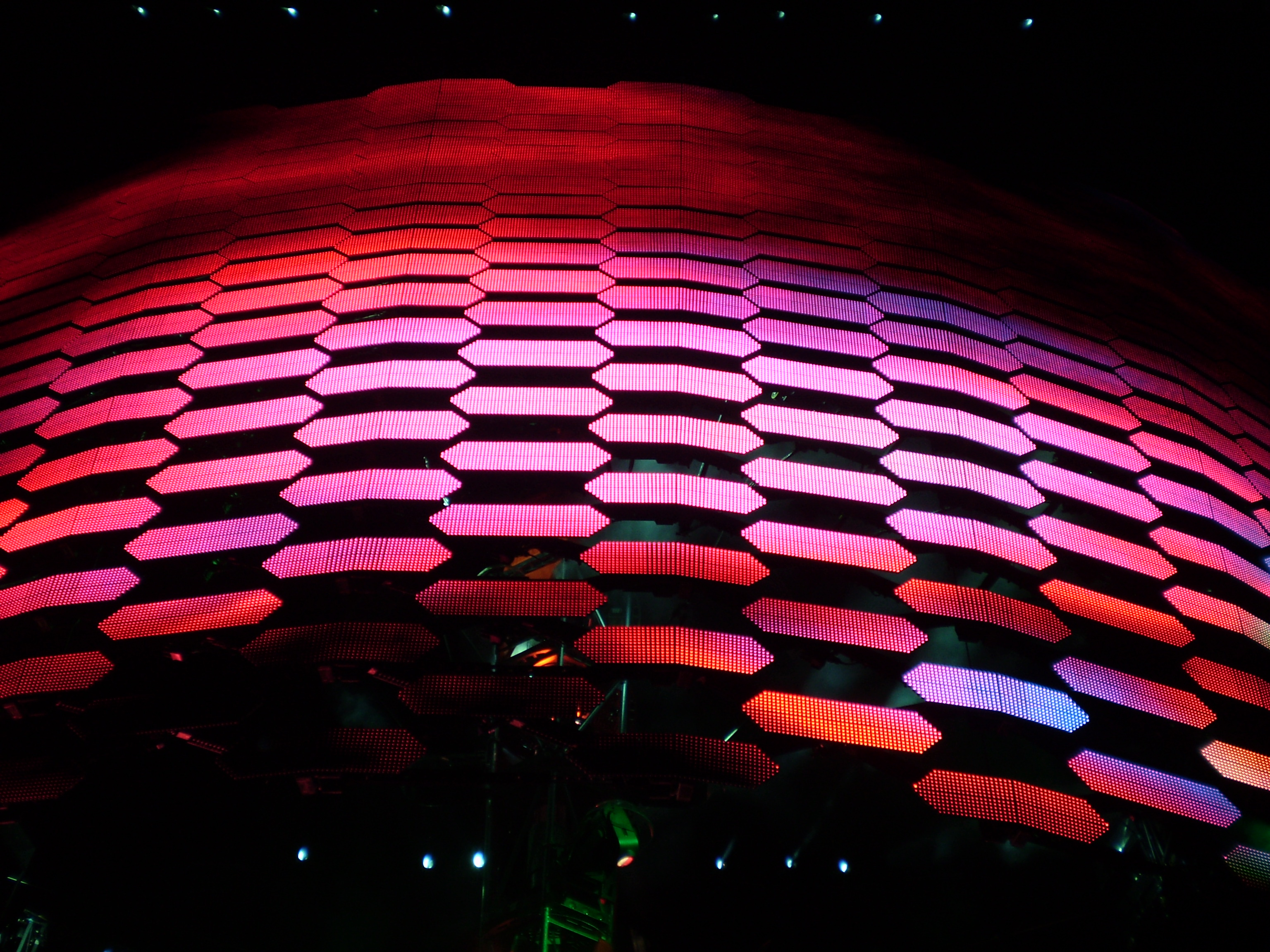
The video screen descends during a performance of "The Unforgettable Fire". The screen is made up of video panels affixed to a pantograph.

The transforming video screen was designed by Mark Fisher in a collaboration with Chuck Hoberman and Frederic Opsomer. The screen was fabricated by Opsomer's company Innovative Designs of Belgium, using LED pixels manufactured by Barco. The screen was purchased and rented to the tour by XL Video. It is made up of elongated hexagonal segments mounted on a multiple pantograph system, which enables it to "open up" or spread apart vertically as an effect during the concerts. The video screen is composed of over one million pieces: 411,000 pixels, 320,000 fasteners, 150,000 machined pieces, and 30,000 cables are needed to create the visual display at each concert. The screen is mounted on a cabled pulley system to enable the entire screen and pantograph system to move lower and closer to the band. The automation for the screen deployment was provided by Kinesys UK. The LED segments of the screen are weather-resistant.

Producing this structure was a challenge, but the effect has been great. It dwarfs the stadium, it makes the stage look clean and breaks down the barrier between band and crowd. Having invested in this technology, I think it's a game changer. I don't know what we'll do next time, but these cleaner stages in stadiums are the way to go.

— Adam Clayton

U2 announced that it would purchase carbon offsets to take into consideration the environmental impact of the large production, which has been estimated to be up to 65,000 tonnes of carbon dioxide; approximately the same amount that would be emitted in flying a passenger plane 34 million miles. In addition to the carbon offsets, the band also set up a page on PickupPal so that people could carpool to concerts in an attempt to lower the carbon footprint. Additionally they launched a fan travel carbon offset program in partnership with Offset Options. Most of the carbon emissions are a result of transporting the three stage structures across Europe and North America. An environmental consultant to carbonfootprint.com noted that to offset the tour's 2009 emissions, the band would have to plant over 20,000 trees. In an interview with BBC Radio, The Edge reiterated that U2 were offsetting their carbon emissions, also stating, "We'd love to have some alternative to big trucks bringing the stuff around but there just isn't one."

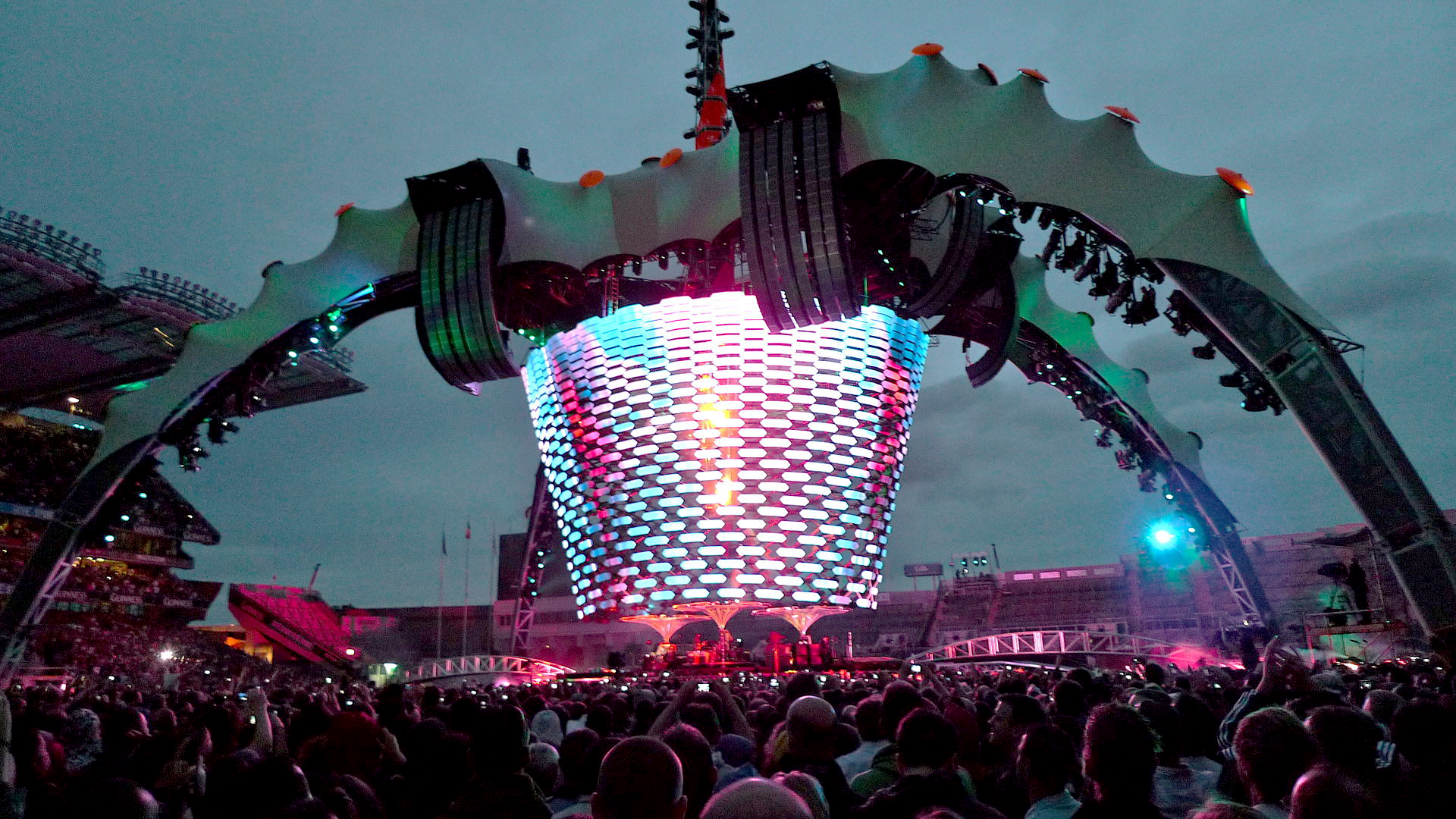
"The Claw" features an expanding video screen and elaborate lighting effects.

Load-out of the massive set from venues took as much as 3 1/2 days. Sound and light equipment was packed into the fleet of trucks first during the four hours following the concert; the remainder of the time was spent deconstructing the steel structures making up the stage using four cranes. The extensive amount of time it took to assemble and disassemble the stage interfered with the development of the schedule for the 2010 Major League Baseball season, due to U2 scheduling shows at four MLB stadiums: O.co Coliseum in Oakland, Angel Stadium in Anaheim, Rogers Centre in Toronto, and Busch Stadium in St. Louis. U2 was also forced to reschedule what would have been their final Giants Stadium concert, when the NFL changed the start time of a New York Jets game, and load-out time from the concert a day and a half prior would have been insufficient.

== Commercial partnerships and philanthropy ==
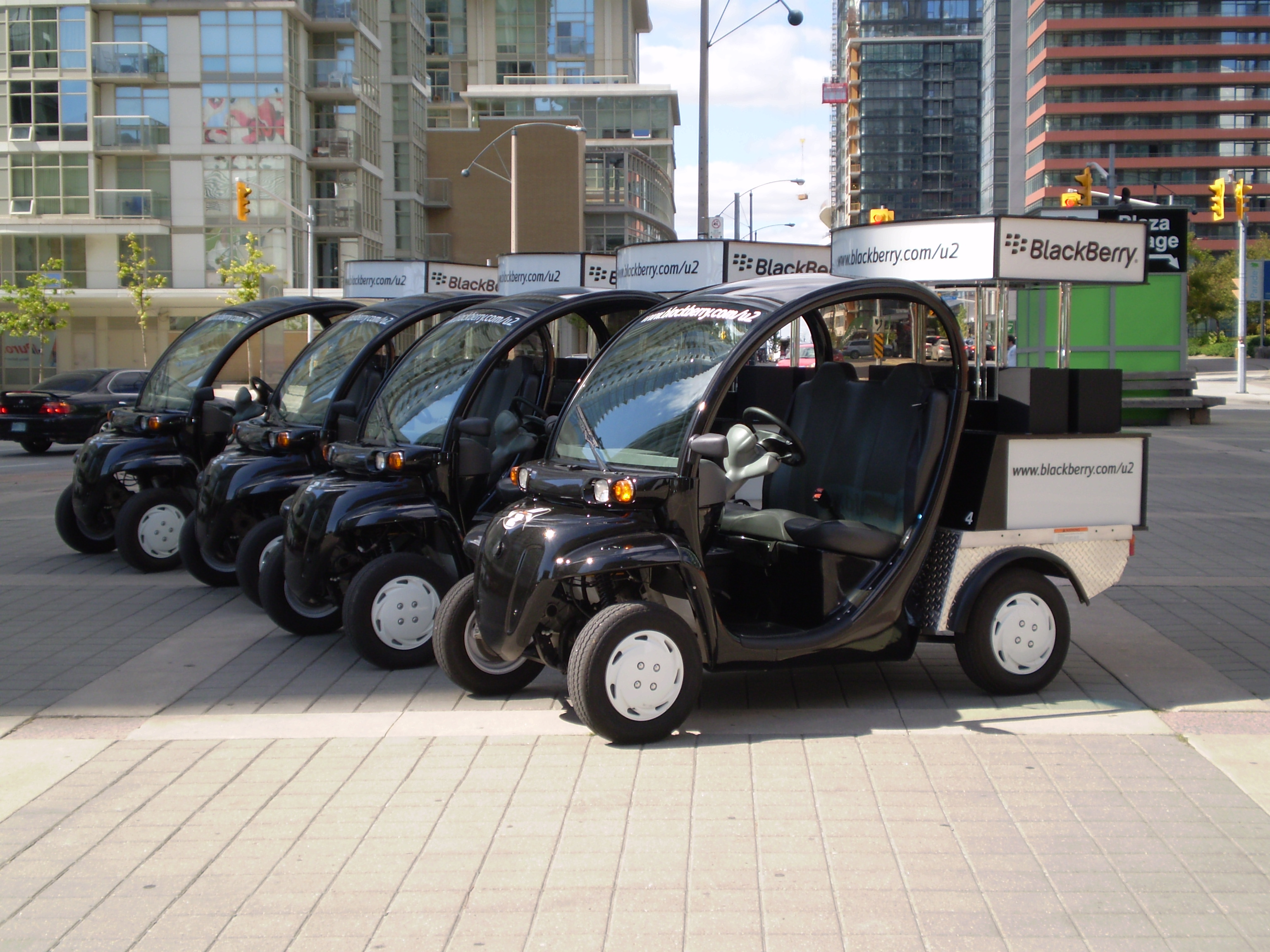
Cars with the BlackBerry and U2 branding in front of Rogers Centre in Toronto.

The tour was U2's first under their 12-year deal with Live Nation. It was sponsored by BlackBerry, in a move that broke U2's prior relationship with Apple Inc. and opened possibilities for collaborations between U2 and Research in Motion on mobile music experiences. Lead singer Bono said of the new relationship, "I'm very excited about this. Research in Motion is going to give us what Apple wouldn't: access to their labs and their people so we can do something really spectacular." The explicit corporate sponsorship of a tour was a first for the group, and was due to the anticipated production costs being higher than for any previous U2 tour. The first commercials for a new BlackBerry application, called the "U2 Mobile App", began airing in early July 2009 against the song "I'll Go Crazy If I Don't Go Crazy Tonight"; the application allows the user to listen to the album No Line on the Horizon, contains a news section which features updates about the tour, and an interactive section that allows the sharing of images and enables the user to see their position during a concert relative to the band and other application users. Models of the stage were added to Google Earth approximately a week before the scheduled concert took place; tour architect Mark Fisher stated, "We thought it would be interesting to put up on Google Earth a piece of portable architecture."

A category of stage-close seats called "The Red Zone" was created to be sold by an auction process, at prices estimated at up to €1,000 ($1,300). All proceeds are to be donated by U2 members to charity, with The Global Fund to Fight AIDS, Tuberculosis and Malaria expected to receive much of it. Approximately €9 million ($11 million) in U2 360° Tour profits is expected to go to charity. The band asked fans to bring masks of Aung San Suu Kyi to concerts and wear them during performances of "Walk On" in her support; the song was originally written for Suu Kyi.

The tour was subject to minor criticisms, at both the events surrounding the opening concerts in Barcelona, and the concerts in Dublin. When rehearsing for the tour in Barcelona, residents of the city complained about the band's noise after 10 pm, which was the time until which the city allowed the band to rehearse. The setup of the band's stage for the Croke Park concerts in Dublin was criticised by fans for only allowing seating around part of the circular-shaped stage, taking away from the 360° seating configuration that was used at other venues. One fan claimed that only 270° of seating around the stage was being utilised for the three Dublin concerts, and that there was no reason that the stage could not be placed in the middle of the venue. Additional criticisms about the Croke Park shows arose from about 80 Dublin citizens, who protested against the Dublin City Council for allowing the band's crew to dismantle the stage in the middle of the night following the three concerts, due to the loud noises caused by the crew. The protest blocked several crew trucks from exiting the venue, putting the tour behind schedule, and tour promoter MCD Productions delivered a letter to the protesters informing them that they could be sued for any of the tour's financial losses due to the protest. In addition to the loudness of the band's crew, the Dublin City Council decided to withhold the band's €80,000 ($104,000) bond, after breaking the 75 decibel maximum volume at all three of the Dublin concerts.

Like most concerts, tour venues have benefited from hosting concerts. North Carolina State University's agreement with Live Nation resulted in $166,000 in parking proceeds and $175,858 food and beverage concessions. Additionally Live Nation agreed to pay for replacing the sod on the football field where the stage and floor seating was located up to a cost of $250,000.

== Ticketing and itinerary ==
The initial tour dates were announced in March 2009. U2 played 44 shows in that year. The tour began in Barcelona on 30 June and played in Europe through 22 August 2009. The North American leg of the tour began on 12 September 2009 in Chicago followed by two nights in Toronto and ended on 28 October 2009 in Vancouver. The band played in Europe in 2010 following the postponement of the second North American leg until 2011. They finished 2010 by playing Australia and New Zealand in November and December. There were multiple shows in each city making it the largest stadium tour of Australia in the band's history.

U2 manager Paul McGuinness confessed anxiety over initial ticket sales taking place during the late 2000s recession. Drummer Larry Mullen, Jr. said, "Will we sell it out? Who knows? Will the economic situation have an impact? Probably. But that's not going to stop us." Bono said, "I want to put on an extraordinary show, but I'd like to own my house when it's over." The tour featured a tiered pricing system for tickets; the most expensive ticket being slightly higher in price than the last tour, but the cheapest tickets, the general admission tickets, being lower. Playing larger capacity venues allowed the band to price tickets more conservatively and subsidise less expensive tickets with costlier ones. In the US, field level tickets were priced at $55, and approximately 10,000 tickets per show were priced at $30. The price points were $30, $55, and depending on the market, $90–95 and $250. McGuinness said, "We have worked very hard to ensure that U2 fans can purchase a great-priced ticket with a guaranteed great view."

Tickets for European shows first went on sale in mid-March, with high demand. Shows in Gothenburg, Amsterdam and Milan sold out reasonably fast, with second dates being added in each city; those also sold out quickly. In The Netherlands, demand rendered all of KPN's 0900 paid service numbers unreachable. The nearly 90,000 tickets for the opening concert in Barcelona were sold in 54 minutes, establishing a new record for concerts in Spain. The tour set a record by selling 650,000 tickets in seven hours. Regarding the quick sellout of two Croke Park shows in Dublin, Bono said: "It's overwhelming, really. It's a very big deal for us to sell-out our hometown at such speed, it's unbelievable. ... We don't take anything for granted." Fans from all around the world travelled to Ireland for the band's hometown shows, leading the Gaelic Athletic Association to close their museum in Croke Park for the duration of the events due to fears over security and excessive demand. The Croke Park shows later won Top Boxscore at the 2009 Billboard Touring Awards.

The first North American tickets went on sale in late March. Fans who purchased general admission tickets were given seating closest to the stage on a first-come, first-served basis. Presales were held for U2.com subscribers, with those holding membership the longest getting the first chance to purchase tickets. Sales were strong, with initial dates in Chicago and outside Boston and New York selling out within minutes once the public sale began, and with second shows being added at each venue. Due to the higher capacity of the 360 degree configuration, the shows often set records for the largest concert attendance at each venue; tour director Craig Evans claims the tour set attendance records for 60 different venues. Two of the U2 360° Tour's concerts remain in the top five highest-attended single concerts in the United States ever, with the 25 October performance in Pasadena, California, setting the record at 97,014 attendees.

The high US demand for tickets for the tour, and the difficulty which some fans had in getting them, brought attention to rapidity with which tickets turned up on the higher-priced secondary market. Some tickets were being resold on the secondary market for prices of up to $7,500. Additionally, pre-sale passwords were being sold on eBay for bids of up to $400. Although some artists were known to be holding back tickets from general sale and delivering them straight into the secondary market, Live Nation said that U2 did not engage in this practice.

=== Postponement of 2010 North American shows ===
Bono sustained an injury to his back during preparation for the North American third leg of the tour, the damage to which included sciatica, a ligament tear, a herniated disc, and partial paralysis of his lower leg and resulted in the need for emergency spine surgery at LMU Klinikum in Munich. Following the surgery, Live Nation announced that the opening concert in Salt Lake City, which had been scheduled to take place on 3 June 2010, would be postponed to a later date, with other dates also potentially being affected. His doctors, who included noted sports physician Hans-Wilhelm Müller-Wohlfahrt, then said Bono had a good prognosis but would need eight weeks of physical rehabilitation, and McGuinness and Live Nation announced that the entire North American leg was being postponed and would be rescheduled into 2011. McGuinness stated, "Our biggest and I believe best tour has been interrupted and we're all devastated. For a performer who lives to be on stage, this is more than a blow. He [Bono] feels robbed of the chance to do what he does best and feels like he has badly let down the band and their audience."

On 13 July 2010, the rescheduled concert dates were announced for 2011, beginning 11 May in Mexico City, Mexico, and ending 30 July in Moncton, Canada. Bono apologised for the inconvenience to fans over their affected travel plans, but noted that it had given the band the opportunity to record new material in the studio which U2 were considering playing live.

== Concert setlists and show themes ==
=== Main set ===
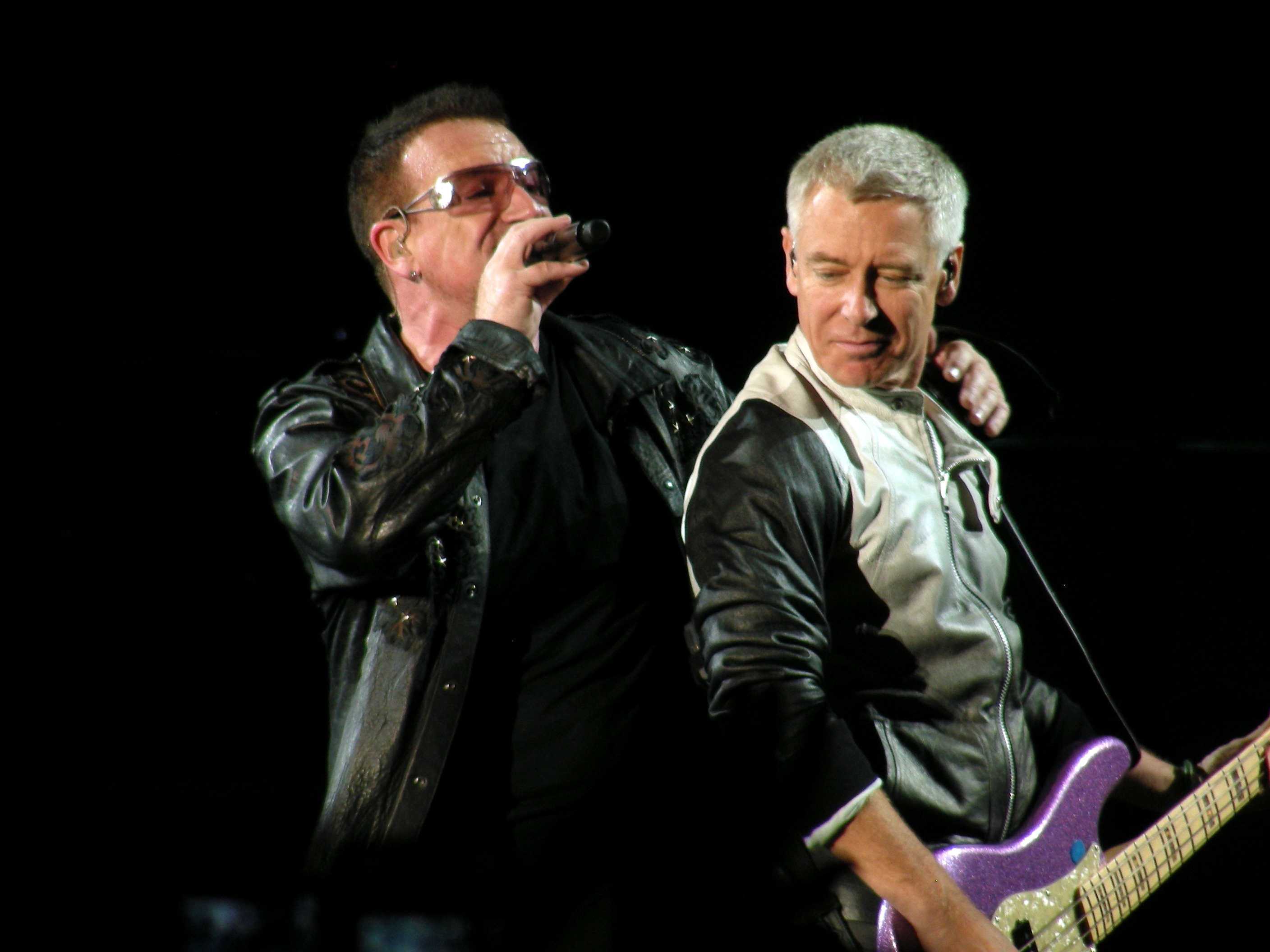
Bono and Adam Clayton during a concert in Charlottesville, Virginia.

Each concert of the U2 360° Tour contained between 22 and 26 songs. Two songs played over the public address system preceded the band's arrival on stage—David Bowie's "Space Oddity" and an outtake from the No Line on the Horizon sessions called "Soon" (previously titled "Kingdom of Your Love"). The opening five tracks were identical each night on the first leg; "Breathe" opened and was followed by "No Line on the Horizon", "Get on Your Boots", "Magnificent", and "Beautiful Day". The next few tracks featured the most variation of the setlist. "I Still Haven't Found What I'm Looking For" was played frequently, while early concerts featured a selection from "Angel of Harlem", "In a Little While", "Desire", and "Party Girl". Concerts later on included "Mysterious Ways", "Until the End of the World", "New Year's Day", and "Stuck in a Moment You Can't Get Out Of". "Stay (Faraway, So Close!)", "Elevation, and "Electrical Storm" were played on rare occasions, and "One", which usually closed the main set, was sometimes performed about half-way through. The rest of the setlist had little variation. "Unknown Caller" was played most nights, and was followed by "The Unforgettable Fire", "City of Blinding Lights", and "Vertigo". The remix arrangement of "I'll Go Crazy If I Don't Go Crazy Tonight" was performed next, featuring Larry Mullen, Jr. walking around the outer stage playing a djembe, followed by "Sunday Bloody Sunday", which features scenes from the 2009 Iranian election protests on the video screen. "Pride (In the Name of Love)", "MLK", "Walk On", "Where the Streets Have No Name", and "One" typically rounded out the main set, though the band occasionally closed it with "Bad" or "Mysterious Ways". "One" was usually preceded by a video from Archbishop Desmond Tutu talking about aid to Africa and the ONE campaign, though the video was played prior to "Where the Streets Have No Name" on occasion.

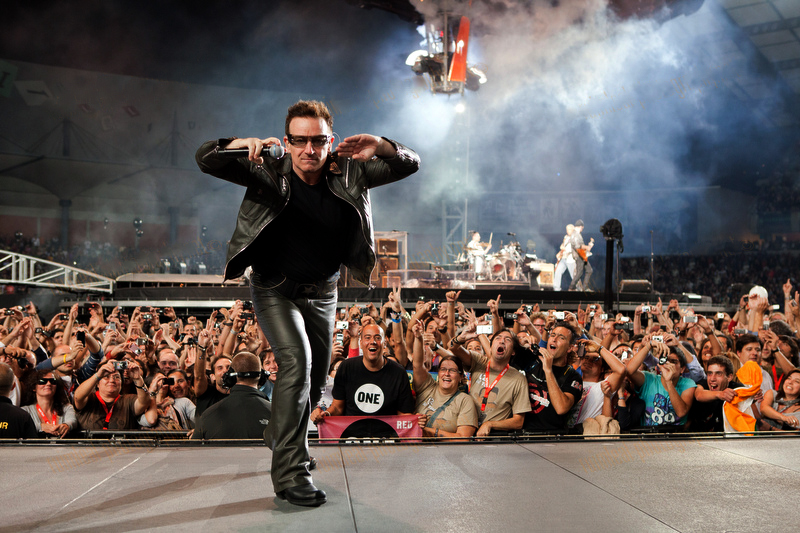
Bono and fans at Estádio Cidade de Coimbra, Portugal

The second leg of the tour featured more variation in the first part of the setlist. "Breathe" opened most concerts, though its place was occasionally taken by "Magnificent". "No Line on the Horizon" continued to follow "Breathe" in early setlists, but was later moved back so that it followed "Beautiful Day" instead. "Mysterious Ways" and "Elevation" were performed more frequently, as was "I Still Haven't Found What I'm Looking For". "Your Blue Room", a track from Original Soundtracks 1, made its live debut on the tour (with recorded guest vocals by Sinéad O'Connor), while "Pride (In the Name of Love)" was dropped. "Unknown Caller" was dropped for a period of several weeks before being revived towards the end of the leg, and "In a Little While" also returned to the setlist.

The third leg of the tour featured the debut of six previously unreleased songs: "North Star", "Glastonbury", the instrumental "Return of the Stingray Guitar", "Every Breaking Wave", "Mercy" and "Boy Falls from the Sky", a song written by Bono and The Edge for the musical Spider-Man: Turn Off the Dark. "Every Breaking Wave" was later released on U2's following studio album, Songs of Innocence (2014), and "Return of the Stingray Guitar" evolved into the backing track for the song "Lucifer's Hands", which was released on deluxe editions of the same album. "Breathe", "Stuck in a Moment You Can't Get Out Of", and "Unknown Caller" were dropped from rotation, while "Miss Sarajevo", "I Will Follow", "Mothers of the Disappeared", "Hold Me, Thrill Me, Kiss Me, Kill Me" and "Spanish Eyes" made their tour debuts. On the fourth leg of the tour, "Scarlet" was performed in place of "MLK" and dedicated to the release of Suu Kyi. "One Tree Hill" made its tour debut and was dedicated to the 29 miners who died in the Pike River Mine disaster; their names were shown on the screen at the conclusion of the song. "All I Want Is You" and "Love Rescue Me" were also included in the set during the fourth leg.

During the sixth leg of the tour in South America, the "Fish Out of Water" remix of "Even Better Than The Real Thing", later released in the 20th anniversary reissue of Achtung Baby, was revived as the show opener. "Out of Control" and "Zooropa" were also debuted, while "In a Little While" was dropped from the setlist. The seventh leg saw the tour debut of "The Fly". It moved "Mysterious Ways" and "Until the End of the World" both up in the setlist to be the third and fourth songs following "The Fly". The last show in Moncton, New Brunswick had the chorus of "The Ballad of Springhill" included in the setlist, as a tribute to the nearby town of Springhill, Nova Scotia, which suffered from a large mining disaster in 1958.

=== Encores ===
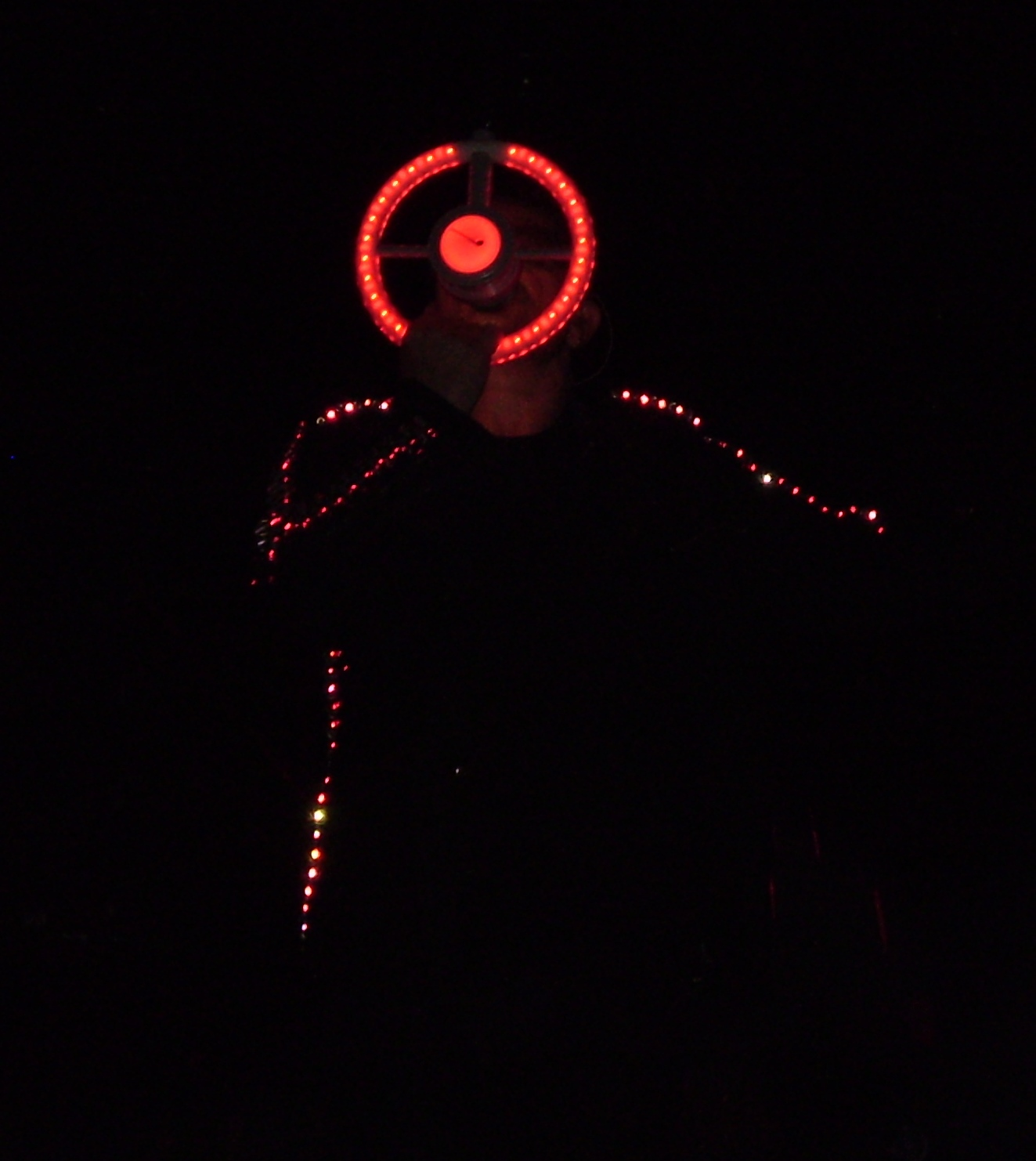
During the encore, Bono wore a laser-embedded suit and sang into a "glowing steering wheel" microphone which hung from above.

The encore was identical each night and consisted of "Ultraviolet (Light My Way)", "With or Without You", and "Moment of Surrender". "Ultraviolet" featured an elaborate staging wherein Bono wore a suit with embedded with lasers that shone through the violet lighting scheme, while singing to, around, and hanging from, an illuminated steering wheel–shaped microphone dropped from above. Following the band's exit from the stage, Elton John's "Rocket Man" was played. Beginning on the second leg of the tour "One" opened the first encore and was followed by "Where the Streets Have No Name", with "Amazing Grace" often used to bridge between them. The second encore remained unchanged until the third leg, when "Hold Me, Thrill Me, Kiss Me, Kill Me" was debuted; U2 rotated it with "Ultraviolet (Light My Way)" to open the encore. At the 2 July 2011 show in Nashville, Bono invited a visually impaired fan on-stage to play "All I Want Is You" on guitar for his wife after the normal set closer "Moment of Surrender." After the song, Bono gave the fan his Gretsch Irish Falcon guitar. At the next show on 5 July 2011 in Chicago, the band performed "One Tree Hill" to end the show in honour of New Zealander Greg Carroll, an employee of the band whose 25th death anniversary was two days prior. The band's first single, "Out of Control", "Bad" and "40" each closed a single show, each of them played after usual closer "Moment of Surrender".

=== Diversity of material performed ===
"The Unforgettable Fire" and "Love Rescue Me" were played in a U2 concert for the first time since the Lovetown Tour in 1990. "Ultraviolet (Light My Way)" and "Zooropa" had not been performed by the band since the Zoo TV Tour in 1993, while "Electrical Storm", a 2002 single from The Best of 1990–2000, was played for the first time ever. "Hold Me, Thrill Me, Kiss Me, Kill Me" was played for the first time since the end of the PopMart Tour in 1998. "Scarlet", from the group's 1981 album October, was played for the first time ever in a concert setting, and for the first time since 1981. Although the band's set became more diverse as the tour went on, the band played fewer songs from No Line on the Horizon, which Mullen felt was "a little bit of a defeat."

=== Setlist ===
The following setlists performed were at the 15 August 2009 concert held at Wembley Stadium in London, the 2 October 2010 concert held at Estádio Cidade de Coimbra in Coimbra, and the 20 July 2011 concert held at New Meadowlands Stadium in New Jersey. These do not represent all shows throughout the tour.

==== 2009 ====
1. "Breathe"
2. "No Line on the Horizon"
3. "Get On Your Boots"
4. "Magnificent"
5. "Beautiful Day"
6. "Until the End of the World"
7. "New Year's Day"
8. "I Still Haven't Found What I'm Looking For"
9. "Stay (Faraway, So Close!)"
10. "Unknown Caller"
11. "The Unforgettable Fire"
12. "City of Blinding Lights"
13. "Vertigo"
14. "I'll Go Crazy If I Don't Go Crazy Tonight" (Remix version)
15. "Sunday Bloody Sunday"
16. "Pride (In the Name of Love)"
17. "MLK"
18. "Walk On"
19. "Where the Streets Have No Name"
20. "One"
21. "Bad"

Encore

22. "Ultraviolet (Light My Way)"
23. "With or Without You"
24. "Moment of Surrender"

==== 2010 ====
1. "Return of the Stingray Guitar"
2. "Beautiful Day"
3. "I Will Follow"
4. "Get On Your Boots"
5. "Magnificent"
6. "Mysterious Ways"
7. "Elevation"
8. "Until the End of the World"
9. "I Still Haven't Found What I'm Looking For"
10. "North Star"
11. "Mercy"
12. "In a Little While"
13. "Miss Sarajevo"
14. "City of Blinding Lights"
15. "Vertigo"
16. "I'll Go Crazy If I Don't Go Crazy Tonight" (Remix version)
17. "Sunday Bloody Sunday"
18. "MLK"
19. "Walk On"

Encore 1

20. "One"
21. "Where the Streets Have No Name"

Encore 2

22. "Hold Me, Thrill Me, Kiss Me, Kill Me"
23. "With or Without You"
24. "Moment of Surrender"

==== 2011 ====
1. "Even Better Than the Real Thing"
2. "The Fly"
3. "Mysterious Ways"
4. "Until the End of the World"
5. "I Will Follow"
6. "Get On Your Boots"
7. "Magnificent"
8. "I Still Haven't Found What I'm Looking For"
9. "Stay (Faraway, So Close!)"
10. "Beautiful Day"
11. "Elevation"
12. "Pride (In the Name of Love)"
13. "Miss Sarajevo"
14. "Zooropa"
15. "City of Blinding Lights"
16. "Vertigo"
17. "I'll Go Crazy If I Don't Go Crazy Tonight" (Remix version)
18. "Sunday Bloody Sunday"
19. "Scarlet"
20. "Walk On"

Encore 1

21. "One"
22. "Where the Streets Have No Name"

Encore 2

23. "Hold Me, Thrill Me, Kiss Me, Kill Me"
24. "With or Without You"
25. "Moment of Surrender"
26. "Out of Control"

=== Rehearsals ===
Before the U2 360° Tour commenced, "If God Will Send His Angels", "Sometimes You Can't Make It on Your Own", and "Drowning Man" (a previously unplayed song from War), were rehearsed, as was "Even Better Than the Real Thing" in the Perfecto mix style, while The Edge stated in an interview with Rolling Stone that "Luminous Times (Hold on to Love)" was also being considered. None of these were played during the first four legs of the tour. Willie Williams stated in his 27 June 2009 tour diary entry on U2.com that the band "really wants [Drowning Man] to work and it sounds great", but the rest of the setlist struggled due to the song's "beautiful melancholy". In his 24 July 2009 entry, Williams noted that "October" and "White as Snow" were also being considered. "Sunday Bloody Sunday" and "Mysterious Ways" were rehearsed in an acoustic style, but performances during the tour were done by the full band. Before the third leg, "Tryin' To Throw Your Arms Around the World" was also rehearsed.

=== Show themes ===
Bono stated that the setlist was divided into two acts and a coda. The first half, from "Breathe" to "Vertigo", focused on the personal, where Bono "envisages himself as a young man, struggling to find his feet in life and in search of some kind of personal epiphany." The remix version of "I'll Go Crazy If I Don't Go Crazy Tonight" was created by the music team Fish out of Water as a mashup of previous remixes by Redanka and Dirty South. The "I'll Go Crazy" remix is intended to disorient the audience as the band moves into the second act, "Sunday Bloody Sunday" to the encore, which focuses more on the political aspect of Bono's persona, where he "[wrestles] with the problems of the wider world." The coda, showcased in the encore, displays U2 "at their most raw and vulnerable, stripped to the metaphorical bone."

== Link up with the International Space Station ==
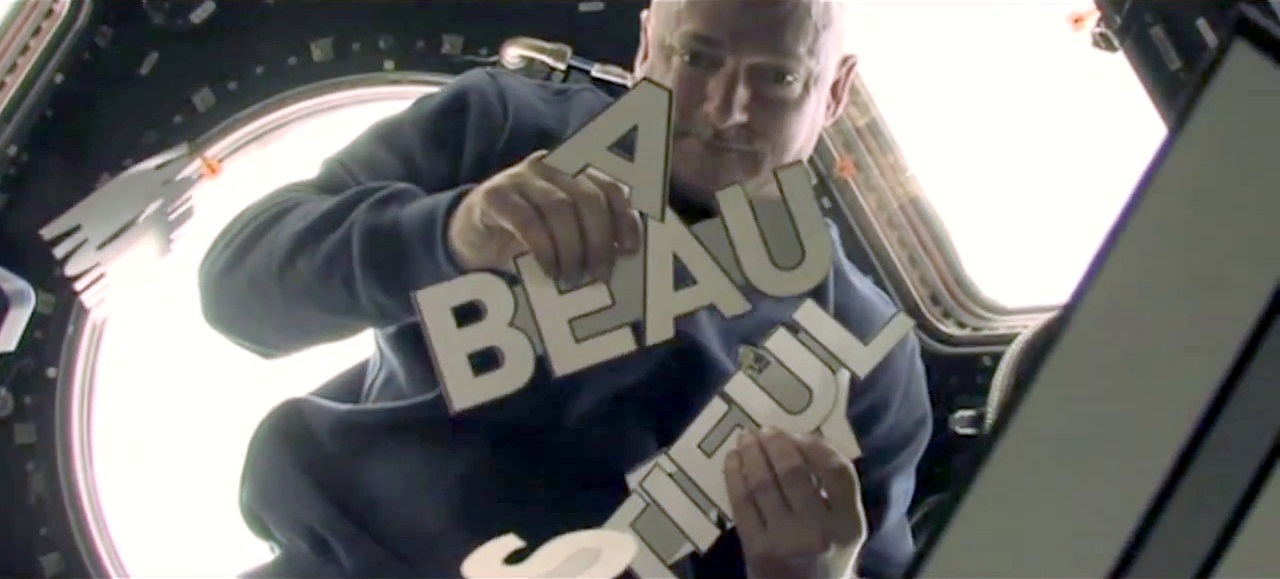
A video of astronaut Mark Kelly was featured prior to performances of "Beautiful Day" on the final leg.

During some concerts on the European leg of the tour, a video link-up with the crew of the International Space Station was aired. This segment was recorded by the astronauts on 26 June 2009. In an interview with BBC Radio, Bono stated that a second video piece had been recorded where the astronauts aboard the International Space Station sang "Your Blue Room". A NASA press release revealed that ESA astronaut Frank De Winne had recorded the final verse of the song on 18 August 2009. Images of the Station and of space provided to the band by NASA were presented in a video montage during the piece, recorded for the North American leg of the tour. A different video piece featuring DeWinne debuted at the Las Vegas concert during "In a Little While" where Frank repeats the bridge at the very end of the song.

During the second North American leg, a recording of astronaut Mark Kelly during Space Shuttle Endeavour's trip to the International Space Station was used to introduce the song "Beautiful Day." Using lyrics from David Bowie's "Space Oddity", he dedicated it to his wife, US Congress member Gabby Giffords. The representative, shot in the head by an assassin in the 2011 Tucson shooting and still in recovery at the time of the recording, had previously selected "Beautiful Day" as a wake-up call for Kelly during a previous shuttle mission.

== Concert broadcast and releases ==
=== U2360° at the Rose Bowl ===
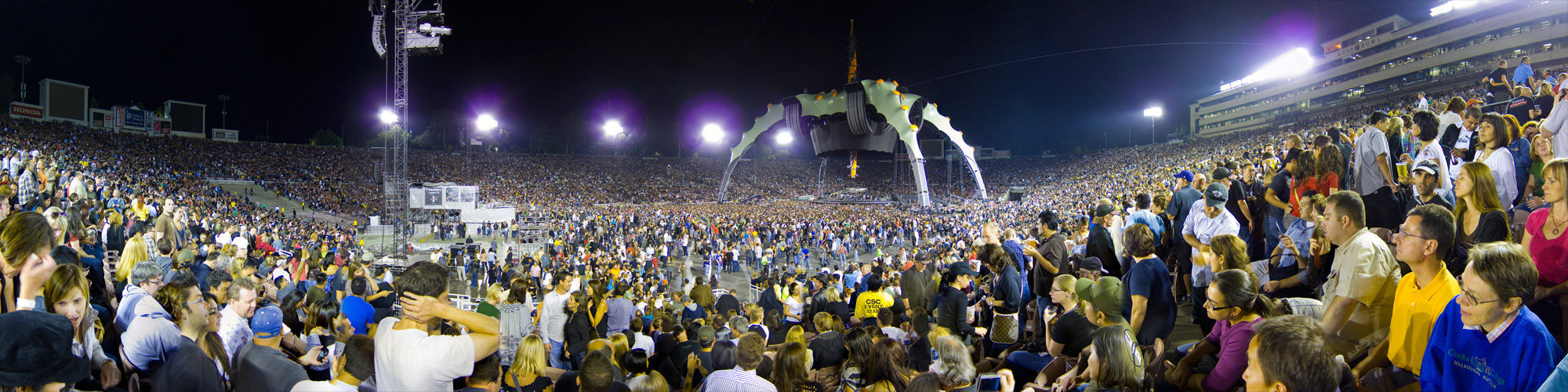
A panorama of the Rose Bowl during the filming of the live concert.

The 25 October 2009 concert from the Rose Bowl in Pasadena, California, U2's penultimate show of the year, was simultaneously broadcast live on YouTube and filmed for a future video release. Directed by Tom Krueger, the shoot used 27 high definition cameras, and it marked the first time since 1983's U2 Live at Red Rocks: Under a Blood Red Sky that the band intentionally filmed over a single night—in contrast to recording multiple shows. It was the first time a concert was streamed live on YouTube, and nearly 10 million people from 188 countries were reported to have watched. The feed was initially set to be restricted to 16 countries but was later made available worldwide. The show's attendance reached 97,014 people, breaking the US record for single concert attendance for one headline act, a mark U2 previously held. In June 2010, the show was released to home video as U2360° at the Rose Bowl on DVD and Blu-ray, receiving positive reviews from critics.

=== U22 ===
On 24 October 2011, it was announced that U2 would release a double CD set entitled U22, containing 22 songs recorded during the tour. Members of U2.com were able to vote on what songs would appear on the release through December 2011. U22 is available only to members of U2.com. A bonus track, "Unknown Caller", was also made available to subscribers.

=== From the Ground Up ===
On 30 September 2012, U2.com announced its 2012/2013 subscriber's pack would contain a "lavish 260-page large-format hardback photobook" called From the Ground Up featuring photographs from the tour, 4 lithographs of each band member, bookmarks and an album called Edge's Pick that will contain 15 tracks from the tour selected by The Edge that were not on U22. Five bonus tracks, "No Line on the Horizon", "Spanish Eyes", "Desire", "Pride", and "Angel of Harlem", were also made available to subscribers.

== Reception ==
=== Critical response ===
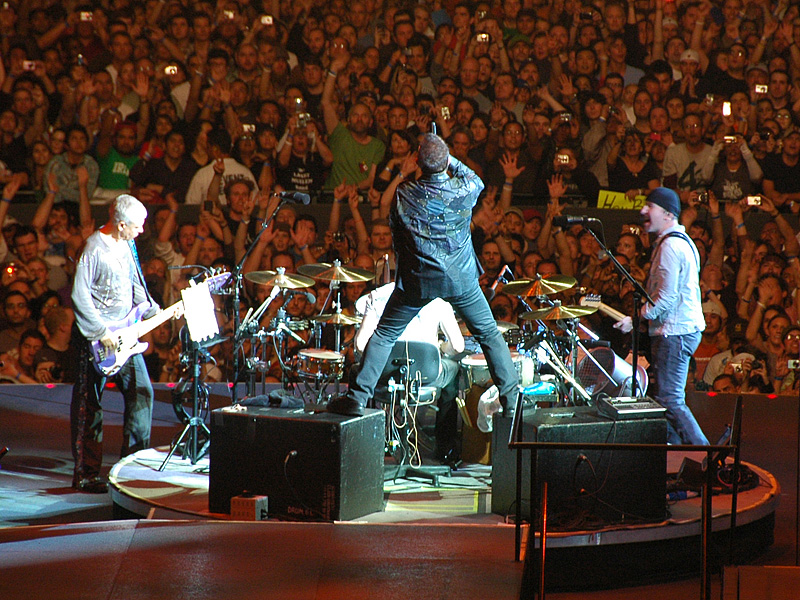
U2 performing in Arlington, Texas in October 2009

Reception towards the U2 360° Tour was generally positive. The New York Times described the stage as "part insect, part spacecraft, part cathedral", noting that the design meant the band was more visible than on previous tours. They also praised the fact that political messages took a backseat to the music, while NBC News suggested that using the video screen to display Aung San Suu Kyi and Desmond Tutu reminded attendees of the plights of people in the developing world. Rolling Stone called the production a cross between Zoo TV and the Elevation Tour and noted that the design elements "all but disappear" from the band's perspective onstage. Canada's National Post saw structural similarities in the stage to the alien craft in War of the Worlds, stating the concert "was as if the band had descended to colonize the stadium with their message of intergalactic hope", and that the space theme meant "When you can play music with someone who's in space, the idea goes, you're shrinking our corner of the universe down to size." The Washington Post stated that the visual display made the band seem invincible, but that the performance was more of an "orgy of light and sound" than a rock concert. In contrast, The Boston Globe complained that the stage's size caused the band to struggle to connect with the audience and play with intimacy, as all four members were often playing to a different section of the stadium.

=== Commercial performance ===
The U2 360° Tour was the highest-grossing tour of 2009, with earnings of over $311 million for the year's 44 shows, and around 3 million ticket sales. Due to the high costs to operate the tour, U2's profits were minimal. Sales of No Line on the Horizon had been slow, meaning the group was not making much money from that either. Through November 2010, the tour's first 66 shows had grossed $443 million and sold 4.3 million tickets. At the 2010 Billboard Touring Awards, U2 were honored for the year's Top Tour and Top Draw for U2 360°.

On 11 April 2011, Live Nation announced that the U2 360° Tour became the highest-grossing concert tour in history, with ticket sales totalling over $700 million. The tour concluded in July 2011 with a final gross of $736,421,586, and a total attendance of 7,272,046. According to Billboard.com, the final gross and attendance figures for the tour were the highest ever reported to the site. At the 2011 Billboard Touring Awards, U2 repeated as winners in the Top Tour and Top Draw categories.

== Tour dates ==
List of concerts, showing date, city, country, venue, opening act, tickets sold, number of available tickets and amount of gross revenue
Date	City	Country	Venue	Opening act	Attendance	Revenue
Leg 1 — Europe
30 June 2009	Barcelona	Spain	Camp Nou	Snow Patrol	182,055 / 182,055	$19,825,497
2 July 2009	Barcelona	Spain	Camp Nou	Snow Patrol	182,055 / 182,055	$19,825,497
7 July 2009	Milan	Italy	San Siro	Snow Patrol	153,806 / 153,806	$15,168,799
8 July 2009	Milan	Italy	San Siro	Snow Patrol	153,806 / 153,806	$15,168,799
11 July 2009	Saint-Denis	France	Stade de France	Kaiser Chiefs	186,544 / 186,544	$20,902,760
12 July 2009	Saint-Denis	France	Stade de France	Kaiser Chiefs	186,544 / 186,544	$20,902,760
15 July 2009	Nice	France	Stade Charles-Ehrmann	Snow Patrol	55,641 / 55,641	$6,261,208
18 July 2009	Berlin	Germany	Olympiastadion	Snow Patrol	88,265 / 88,265	$9,169,830
20 July 2009	Amsterdam	Netherlands	Amsterdam Arena	Snow Patrol	125,866 / 125,866	$12,583,998
21 July 2009	Amsterdam	Netherlands	Amsterdam Arena	Snow Patrol	125,866 / 125,866	$12,583,998
24 July 2009	Dublin	Ireland	Croke Park	Glasvegas; Damien Dempsey	243,198 / 243,198	$28,815,352
25 July 2009	Dublin	Ireland	Croke Park	Kaiser Chiefs; Republic of Loose	243,198 / 243,198	$28,815,352
27 July 2009	Dublin	Ireland	Croke Park	Bell X1; The Script	243,198 / 243,198	$28,815,352
31 July 2009	Gothenburg	Sweden	Ullevi	Snow Patrol	119,297 / 119,297	$11,047,995
1 August 2009	Gothenburg	Sweden	Ullevi	Snow Patrol	119,297 / 119,297	$11,047,995
3 August 2009	Gelsenkirchen	Germany	Veltins-Arena	Snow Patrol	73,704 / 73,704	$7,292,826
6 August 2009	Chorzów	Poland	Silesian Stadium	Snow Patrol	75,180 / 75,180	$6,414,960
9 August 2009	Zagreb	Croatia	Stadion Maksimir	Snow Patrol; The Hours	124,012 / 124,012	$12,700,784
10 August 2009	Zagreb	Croatia	Stadion Maksimir	Snow Patrol; The Hours	124,012 / 124,012	$12,700,784
14 August 2009	London	England	Wembley Stadium	Elbow; The Hours	164,244 / 164,244	$20,680,860
15 August 2009	London	England	Wembley Stadium	Glasvegas; The Hours	164,244 / 164,244	$20,680,860
18 August 2009	Glasgow	Scotland	Hampden Park	Glasvegas; The Hours	50,917 / 50,917	$5,290,103
20 August 2009	Sheffield	England	Don Valley Stadium	Elbow; The Hours	49,955 / 49,955	$5,147,896
22 August 2009	Cardiff	Wales	Millennium Stadium	Glasvegas; The Hours	66,538 / 66,538	$7,041,576
Leg 2 — North America
12 September 2009	Chicago	United States	Soldier Field	Snow Patrol	135,872 / 135,872	$13,860,480
13 September 2009	Chicago	United States	Soldier Field	Snow Patrol	135,872 / 135,872	$13,860,480
16 September 2009	Toronto	Canada	Rogers Centre	Snow Patrol	115,411 / 115,411	$9,571,672
17 September 2009	Toronto	Canada	Rogers Centre	Snow Patrol	115,411 / 115,411	$9,571,672
20 September 2009	Foxborough	United States	Gillette Stadium	Snow Patrol	138,805 / 138,805	$12,859,778
21 September 2009	Foxborough	United States	Gillette Stadium	Snow Patrol	138,805 / 138,805	$12,859,778
23 September 2009	East Rutherford	United States	Giants Stadium	Muse	161,810 / 161,810	$16,128,950
24 September 2009	East Rutherford	United States	Giants Stadium	Muse	161,810 / 161,810	$16,128,950
29 September 2009	Landover	United States	FedExField	Muse	84,754 / 84,754	$6,718,315
1 October 2009	Charlottesville	United States	Scott Stadium	Muse	52,433 / 52,433	$4,738,695
3 October 2009	Raleigh	United States	Carter–Finley Stadium	Muse	55,027 / 55,027	$4,962,240
6 October 2009	Atlanta	United States	Georgia Dome	Muse	61,419 / 61,419	$5,746,430
9 October 2009	Tampa	United States	Raymond James Stadium	Muse	72,688 / 72,688	$6,399,375
12 October 2009	Arlington	United States	Cowboys Stadium	Muse	70,766 / 70,766	$6,664,880
14 October 2009	Houston	United States	Reliant Stadium	Muse	58,328 / 58,328	$5,985,101
18 October 2009	Norman	United States	Oklahoma Memorial Stadium	The Black Eyed Peas	50,951 / 50,951	$4,395,085
20 October 2009	Glendale	United States	University of Phoenix Stadium	The Black Eyed Peas	50,775 / 50,775	$4,912,050
23 October 2009	Whitney	United States	Sam Boyd Stadium	The Black Eyed Peas	42,213 / 42,213	$4,641,280
25 October 2009	Pasadena	United States	Rose Bowl	The Black Eyed Peas	97,014 / 97,014	$9,960,036
28 October 2009	Vancouver	Canada	BC Place Stadium	The Black Eyed Peas	63,802 / 63,802	$5,748,919
Leg 3 — Europe
6 August 2010	Turin	Italy	Stadio Olimpico di Torino	Kasabian	42,441 / 42,441	$3,944,452
10 August 2010	Frankfurt	Germany	Commerzbank-Arena	Kasabian	53,825 / 53,825	$5,544,868
12 August 2010	Hanover	Germany	AWD-Arena	Kasabian	56,494 / 56,494	$4,967,381
15 August 2010	Horsens	Denmark	CASA Arena Horsens	Snow Patrol	69,886 / 69,886	$7,809,611
16 August 2010	Horsens	Denmark	CASA Arena Horsens	Snow Patrol	69,886 / 69,886	$7,809,611
20 August 2010	Helsinki	Finland	Helsinki Olympic Stadium	Razorlight	106,360 / 106,360	$10,642,517
21 August 2010	Helsinki	Finland	Helsinki Olympic Stadium	Razorlight	106,360 / 106,360	$10,642,517
25 August 2010	Moscow	Russia	Luzhniki Stadium	Snow Patrol	60,496 / 60,496	$7,986,534
30 August 2010	Vienna	Austria	Ernst-Happel-Stadion	OneRepublic	69,253 / 69,253	$6,866,065
3 September 2010	Athens	Greece	Olympic Stadium	Snow Patrol; Aviv Geffen	82,622 / 82,622	$7,321,356
6 September 2010	Istanbul	Turkey	Atatürk Olympic Stadium	Snow Patrol	54,278 / 54,278	$3,775,662
11 September 2010	Zürich	Switzerland	Letzigrund	OneRepublic	90,349 / 90,349	$9,152,209
12 September 2010	Zürich	Switzerland	Letzigrund	OneRepublic	90,349 / 90,349	$9,152,209
15 September 2010	Munich	Germany	Olympiastadion	OneRepublic	76,150 / 76,150	$7,624,367
18 September 2010	Saint-Denis	France	Stade de France	Interpol	96,540 / 96,540	$10,175,248
22 September 2010	Brussels	Belgium	King Baudouin Stadium	Interpol	144,338 / 144,338	$15,074,746
23 September 2010	Brussels	Belgium	King Baudouin Stadium	Interpol	144,338 / 144,338	$15,074,746
26 September 2010	San Sebastián	Spain	Estadio Anoeta	Interpol	47,721 / 47,721	$4,956,464
30 September 2010	Seville	Spain	Estadio Olímpico de Sevilla	Interpol	76,159 / 76,159	$7,519,534
2 October 2010	Coimbra	Portugal	Estádio Cidade de Coimbra	Interpol	109,985 / 109,985	$9,925,611
3 October 2010	Coimbra	Portugal	Estádio Cidade de Coimbra	Interpol	109,985 / 109,985	$9,925,611
8 October 2010	Rome	Italy	Stadio Olimpico	Interpol	75,847 / 75,847	$8,215,742
Leg 4 — Oceania
25 November 2010	Auckland	New Zealand	Mount Smart Stadium	Jay-Z	93,519 / 93,519	$8,819,418
26 November 2010	Auckland	New Zealand	Mount Smart Stadium	Jay-Z	93,519 / 93,519	$8,819,418
1 December 2010	Melbourne	Australia	Etihad Stadium	Jay-Z	105,312 / 105,312	$13,460,407
3 December 2010	Melbourne	Australia	Etihad Stadium	Jay-Z	105,312 / 105,312	$13,460,407
8 December 2010	Brisbane	Australia	Suncorp Stadium	Jay-Z	85,745 / 85,745	$11,031,839
9 December 2010	Brisbane	Australia	Suncorp Stadium	Jay-Z	85,745 / 85,745	$11,031,839
13 December 2010	Sydney	Australia	ANZ Stadium	Jay-Z	107,155 / 107,155	$13,695,929
14 December 2010	Sydney	Australia	ANZ Stadium	Jay-Z	107,155 / 107,155	$13,695,929
18 December 2010	Perth	Australia	Subiaco Oval	Jay-Z	108,706 / 108,706	$13,910,989
19 December 2010	Perth	Australia	Subiaco Oval	Jay-Z	108,706 / 108,706	$13,910,989
Leg 5 – Africa
13 February 2011	Johannesburg	South Africa	FNB Stadium	Springbok Nude Girls; Amadou & Mariam	94,232 / 94,232	$9,433,051
18 February 2011	Cape Town	South Africa	Cape Town Stadium	Springbok Nude Girls; Amadou & Mariam	72,532 / 72,532	$6,107,754
Leg 6 — South America
25 March 2011	Santiago	Chile	Estadio Nacional de Chile	Muse	77,765 / 77,765	$7,550,446
30 March 2011	La Plata	Argentina	Estadio Ciudad de La Plata	Muse	172,029 / 172,029	$20,550,302
2 April 2011	La Plata	Argentina	Estadio Ciudad de La Plata	Muse	172,029 / 172,029	$20,550,302
3 April 2011	La Plata	Argentina	Estadio Ciudad de La Plata	Muse	172,029 / 172,029	$20,550,302
9 April 2011	São Paulo	Brazil	Estádio do Morumbi	Muse	269,491 / 269,491	$32,754,065
10 April 2011	São Paulo	Brazil	Estádio do Morumbi	Muse	269,491 / 269,491	$32,754,065
13 April 2011	São Paulo	Brazil	Estádio do Morumbi	Muse	269,491 / 269,491	$32,754,065
Leg 7 — North America
11 May 2011	Mexico City	Mexico	Estadio Azteca	Snow Patrol	282,978 / 282,978	$22,866,542
14 May 2011	Mexico City	Mexico	Estadio Azteca	Snow Patrol	282,978 / 282,978	$22,866,542
15 May 2011	Mexico City	Mexico	Estadio Azteca	Snow Patrol	282,978 / 282,978	$22,866,542
21 May 2011	Denver	United States	Invesco Field	The Fray	77,918 / 77,918	$6,663,410
24 May 2011	Salt Lake City	United States	Rice-Eccles Stadium	The Fray	47,710 / 47,710	$3,029,760
29 May 2011	Winnipeg	Canada	Canad Inns Stadium	The Fray	47,190 / 47,190	$4,908,091
1 June 2011	Edmonton	Canada	Commonwealth Stadium	The Fray	66,835 / 66,835	$6,498,291
4 June 2011	Seattle	United States	Qwest Field	Lenny Kravitz	69,439 / 69,439	$6,118,785
7 June 2011	Oakland	United States	O.co Coliseum	Lenny Kravitz	64,829 / 64,829	$6,075,895
17 June 2011	Anaheim	United States	Angel Stadium of Anaheim	Lenny Kravitz	105,955 / 105,955	$10,790,140
18 June 2011	Anaheim	United States	Angel Stadium of Anaheim	Lenny Kravitz	105,955 / 105,955	$10,790,140
22 June 2011	Baltimore	United States	M&T Bank Stadium	Florence and the Machine	74,557 / 74,557	$6,832,510
Leg 7 — Europe
24 June 2011 (Note: The show on 24 June 2011 in Pilton was part of the 2011 Glastonbury Festival.)	Pilton	England	Worthy Farm	—N/a	—N/a	—N/a
Leg 8 — North America
26 June 2011	East Lansing	United States	Spartan Stadium	Florence and the Machine	63,824 / 63,824	$5,064,980
29 June 2011	Miami Gardens	United States	Sun Life Stadium	Florence and the Machine	72,569 / 72,569	$6,799,670
2 July 2011	Nashville	United States	Vanderbilt Stadium	Florence and the Machine	46,857 / 46,857	$4,269,125
5 July 2011	Chicago	United States	Soldier Field	Interpol	64,297 / 64,297	$5,786,335
8 July 2011	Montreal	Canada	Hippodrome de Montreal	Interpol	162,466 / 162,466	$17,178,724
9 July 2011	Montreal	Canada	Hippodrome de Montreal	Interpol	162,466 / 162,466	$17,178,724
11 July 2011	Toronto	Canada	Rogers Centre	Interpol	58,420 / 58,420	$6,856,131
14 July 2011	Philadelphia	United States	Lincoln Financial Field	Interpol	72,389 / 72,389	$6,536,230
17 July 2011	St. Louis	United States	Busch Stadium	Interpol	52,273 / 52,273	$4,423,395
20 July 2011	East Rutherford	United States	New Meadowlands Stadium	Interpol	88,491 / 88,491	$8,927,150
23 July 2011	Minneapolis	United States	TCF Bank Stadium	Interpol	59,843 / 59,843	$5,163,440
26 July 2011	Pittsburgh	United States	Heinz Field	Interpol	55,823 / 55,823	$5,050,730
30 July 2011	Moncton	Canada	Magnetic Hill Concert Site	Carney; Arcade Fire	66,823 / 66,823	$6,127,953
Total					7,272,046 / 7,272,046 (100%)	$736,421,584

== See also ==
- List of highest-grossing concert series at a single venue
- List of most-attended concert series at a single venue
- Timeline of U2
