= Finery =

Finery can refer to:

- Finery, a hearth for a metallurgy process done in a finery forge
- Finery (company), a British fashion label
- Finery, expensive or ostentatious clothes.

== See also ==
- Fining (disambiguation)
