= From the Ground Up: Edge's Picks from U2360° =

Live album by U2
- Released: 17 December 2012
- Recorded: July 2009 – July 2011 at various locations during U2360° Tour
- Genre: Rock
- Length: 67:37
- Label: Universal-Island
- Producer: Declan Gaffney

U2 chronology
U22: A 22 Track Live Collection from U2360° (2012)	From the Ground Up: Edge's Picks from U2360° (2012)	Songs of Innocence (2014)

From the Ground Up: Edge's Picks from U2360° is a live album released by the Irish rock band U2 in December 2012 only available to u2.com subscribers. The 15 tracks, recorded from the U2 360° Tour, were selected by guitarist The Edge.

== Track listing ==
All tracks are written by U2.

No.	Title	Recorded at	Length
1.	"Breathe"	Stadio San Siro, Milan, 8 July 2009	5:34
2.	"I Will Follow"	Stade Roi Baudouin, Brussels, 22 September 2010	3:55
3.	"Get On Your Boots"	Gillette Stadium, Foxborough, 20 September 2009	4:07
4.	"New Year's Day"	Croke Park, Dublin, 27 July 2009	4:48
5.	"Electrical Storm"	Stadio San Siro, Milan, 8 July 2009	4:48
6.	"Stuck in a Moment You Can't Get Out Of"	Estadio Azteca, Mexico City, 11 May 2011	4:48
7.	"Your Blue Room" (featuring Sinéad O'Connor, Frank De Winne and fellow NASA astronauts)	Giants Stadium, East Rutherford, 23 September 2009	4:19
8.	"Vertigo"	Subiaco Oval, Perth, 18 December 2010	4:08
9.	"I'll Go Crazy If I Don't Go Crazy Tonight"	Stade de France, Paris, 11 July 2009	6:30
10.	"Sunday Bloody Sunday"	Vanderbilt Stadium, Nashville, 2 July 2011	4:11
11.	"Scarlet"	Vanderbilt Stadium, Nashville, 2 July 2011	2:30
12.	"In a Little While" (featuring Frank De Winne)	Estadio Morumbi, São Paulo, 9 April 2011	3:35
13.	"Miss Sarajevo"	Estadio Unico de La Plata, Buenos Aires, 30 March 2011	4:11
14.	"Hold Me, Thrill Me, Kiss Me, Kill Me"	Estadio Nacional, Santiago, 25 March 2011	5:18
15.	""40""	Magnetic Hill Music Festival, Moncton, 30 July 2011	4:54
Total length:			67:37

Bonus tracks (digital download)
No.	Title	Recorded at	Length
1.	"No Line on the Horizon"	Don Valley Stadium, Sheffield, 20 August 2009	4:25
2.	"Spanish Eyes"	Estadio Anoeta, San Sebastián, 26 September 2010	2:51
3.	"Desire"	Subiaco Oval, Perth, 19 December 2010	2:51
4.	"Pride (In the Name of Love)"	Veltins-Arena, Gelsenkirchen, 3 August 2009	3:48
5.	"Angel of Harlem"	Stade de France, Paris, 12 July 2009	5:21
Total length:			19:16

== Personnel ==
U2

- Bono – lead vocals, guitar
- The Edge – guitar, backing vocals, piano; bass guitar on "40"
- Adam Clayton – bass guitar; guitar on "40"
- Larry Mullen Jr. – drums, percussion

Additional

- Terry Lawless – keyboards on track 5, bonus track 4. Hammond organ on track 12.

Technical

- Production – Declan Gaffney
- Mixing – Declan Gaffney
- Mastering – Pete Maher
