= Refining (glass) =

Refining is the removal of bubbles from the molten glass. Alternatively, the term "Fining" is used; in this case, "refining" refers to the chemical processes only.

Refining is supported by high temperature and stirring, as well as chemical reactions caused by refining agents. Refining agents increase the volume of bubbles and “seeds” (small bubbles), facilitating their ascension. For the most common types of glass production sulfate raw materials are used, in particular, Na_{2}SO_{4}, decomposing into SO_{2} and O_{2}. Glass types that melt at comparatively high temperatures, such as borosilicate glasses, use chlorides, such as NaCl, having a sufficiently high vapour pressure at refining temperatures. Alkali-free glasses with high melting temperature, such as LCD glasses, use tin oxide, SnO_{2}. In the following cooling process, gases from bubbles are reabsorbed in the melt. Redox agents such as Sb_{2}O_{3} may release or absorb oxygen depending on temperature and composition. Apart from chemical refining, bubbling, i.e. direct blowing of gas into the melt is used. Less common are methods like ultrasonic refining or low-pressure refining.
