= Elevation Tour =

2001 concert tour by U2

- Tour by U2
- Location: North America; Europe
- Associated album: All That You Can't Leave Behind
- Start date: 24 March 2001
- End date: 2 December 2001
- Legs: 3
- No. of shows: 113
- Attendance: 2,179,642
- Box office: US$143.5 million ($260.92 in 2025 dollars)

U2 concert chronology
- PopMart Tour (1997–1998); Elevation Tour (2001); Vertigo Tour (2005–2006)

The Elevation Tour was a worldwide concert tour by the Irish rock band U2. Staged in support of the group's 2000 album All That You Can't Leave Behind, the tour visited arenas across North America and Europe in 2001. Contrasting with the extravagant, outdoor productions of the band's previous two live ventures, the Zoo TV Tour (1992–1993) and the PopMart Tour (1997–1998), the Elevation Tour saw them return to indoor arenas with a much more stripped-down, intimate stage design. The stage featured a heart-shaped catwalk that encircled many audience members, and festival seating was offered in the United States for the first time in the group's history.

The Elevation Tour comprised 113 shows over three legs. It opened on 24 March 2001 with the first leg in North America, the second leg in Europe that summer, and the third leg returning to North America that autumn, ending on 2 December 2001. It was both the highest-grossing concert tour in North America (US$109.7 million) and globally (US$143.5 million) that year. Its success was capped off by the band's performance at the Super Bowl XXXVI halftime show in 2002. The tour was depicted in two concert films, Elevation 2001: Live from Boston and U2 Go Home: Live from Slane Castle, Ireland.

== Stage design and show production ==
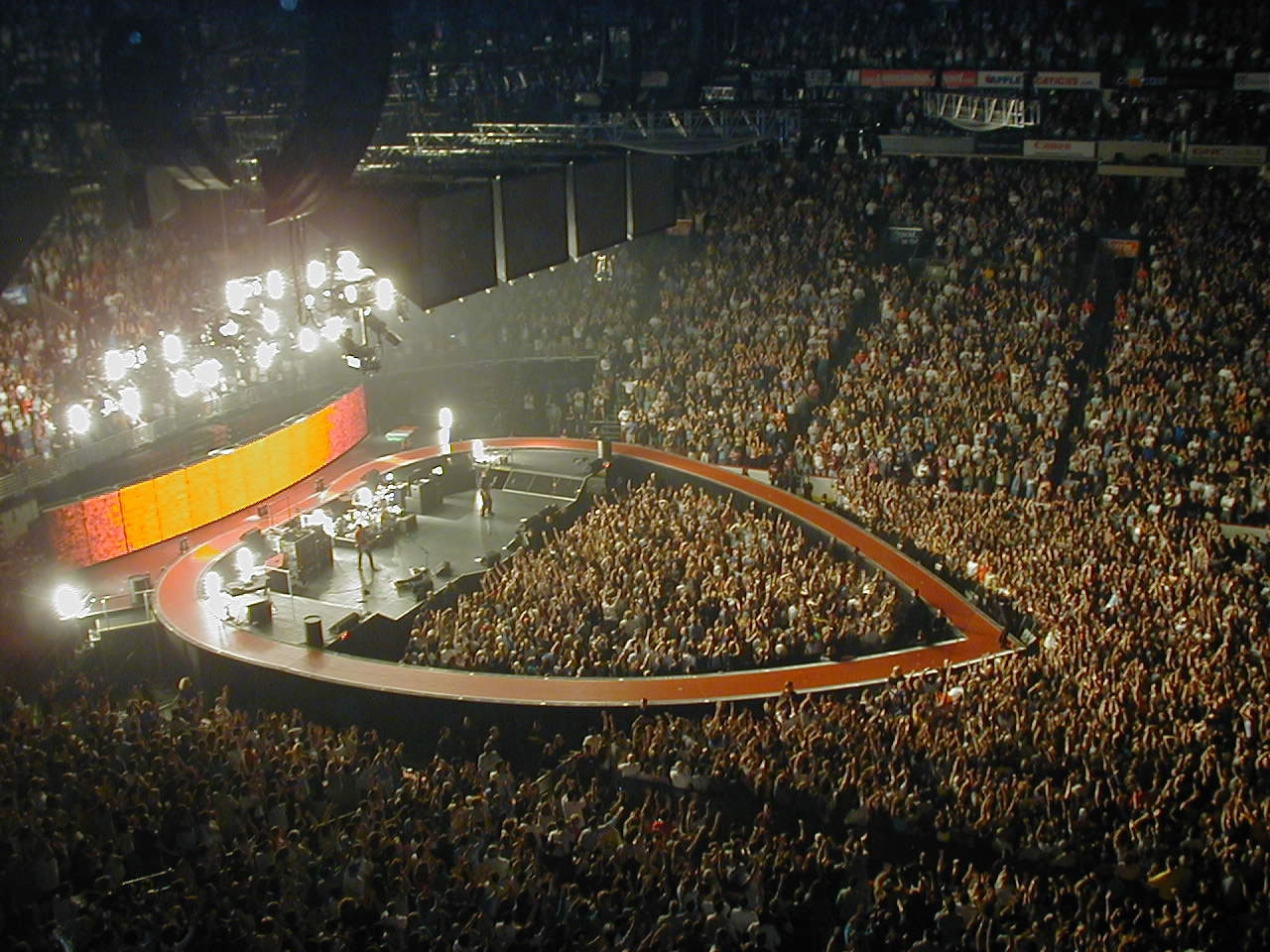
The Elevation Tour stage design was stripped down compared to the elaborate stadium sets on the band's previous two tours. It featured a heart-shaped ramp around the main stage.

The Elevation Tour show was designed by Willie Williams, with Mark Fisher serving as the architect. The stage, built by Tait Towers, measured 80 feet (24 m) wide by 100 feet (30 m) deep and featured an open center. Extending from the wings of the main stage were curved ramps shaped like the bottom of a heart, which joined together at the center of the venue floor. The heart shape was inspired by the video graphics being produced for the tour, and it was chosen by the creative team early in the design process. At the suggestion of bassist Adam Clayton, the stage was given an open center that could be filled with fans; the first 300 general admission ticketholders to queue before a concert were given wristbands and allowed access to the center of the heart. Williams was amused that the catwalks were the same shape as the vertical golden arch from the PopMart Tour stage when laid horizontally. The Elevation Tour stage was placed at one end of the venues, with seating offered "in the round". Due to this configuration, the stage designers focused on ensuring sightlines were not obstructed for anyone. Fisher said, "With a show done in the round, you can't really have any scenery because what is background scenery for one person is a sightline obstruction to another." To facilitate this, the stage height was kept low to the venue floor, with the main stage built 5 feet (1.5 m) high and the wings 7 feet (2.1 m) high.

A video wall constructed by Brilliant Stages was located at the rear of the stage, measuring 8 feet (2.4 m) high by 64 feet (20 m) wide. It comprised 13 sections that could independently rise out of the stage or lower below it. The video wall featured Barco DLite LED panels and was provided by XL Video; it featured more LEDs than the video screen from the PopMart Tour, which was 55 feet (17 m) high by 170 feet (52 m) wide. The idea for the video wall was suggested by lead vocalist Bono, who preferred it over the video options that Fisher showed him. Williams called the amount of backlight produced by the video wall "ridiculous".

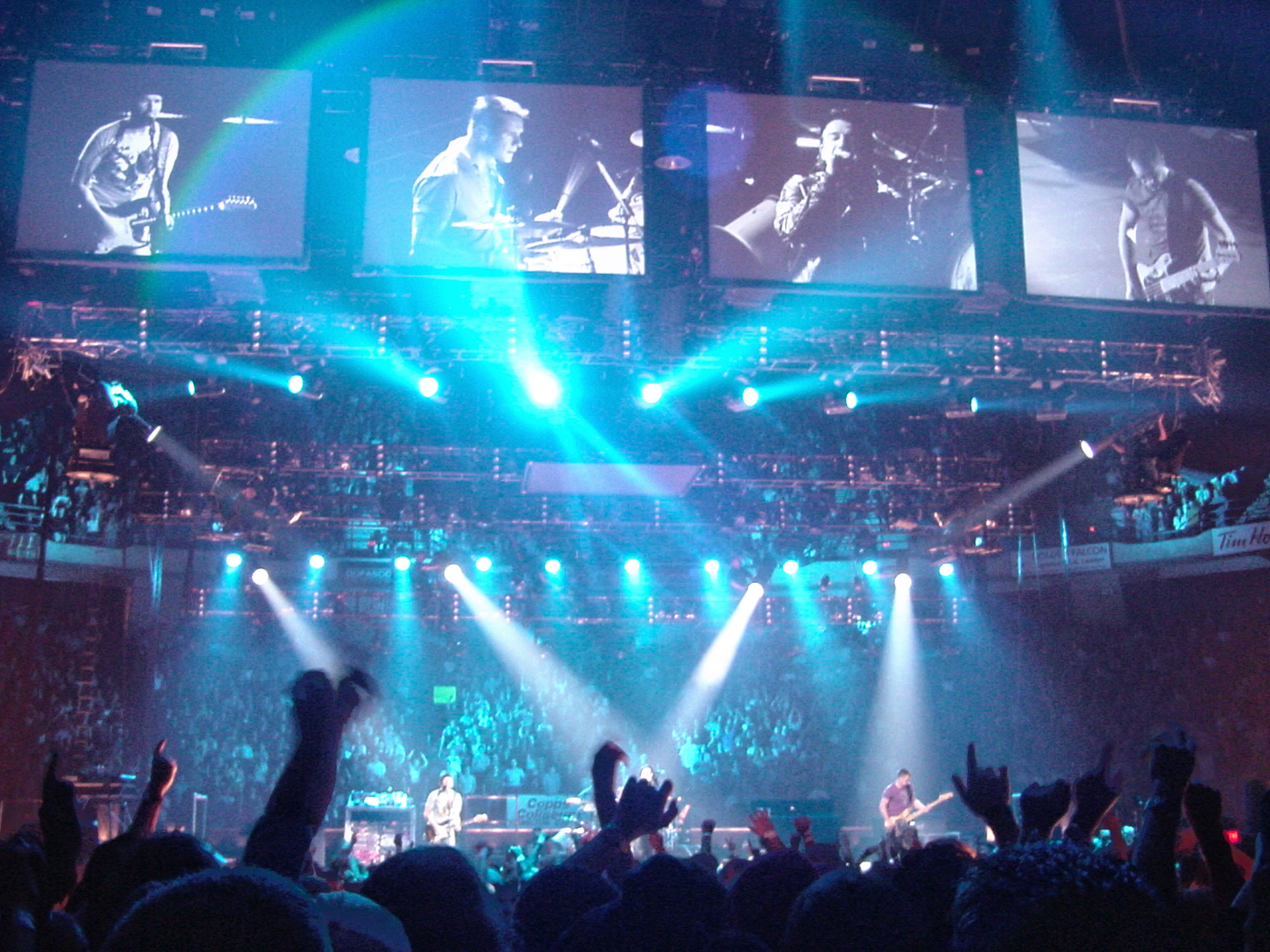
Four video screens above the front of the stage displayed camera feeds dedicated to each band member.

In lieu of traditional image magnification (IMAG), four video screens were hung above the front of the stage, each of them displaying a black-and-white camera feed dedicated to a specific member of U2. Four long-lens cameras followed the band members and presented a "raw" video feed of each, without the intervention of a video director. The setup was Williams's response to what he saw as a growing trend with rock shows having "big video screens on either side running something that looks like an HBO special". He believed such a trend instilled a mindset into the audience that the most interesting thing happening at a given moment was what the video screens were displaying, thus diverting attention away from the actual live performance. Williams was inspired by his experience over the years "standing behind video directors and engineers, seeing what they were seeing" on the video monitors. Rather than present a director's vision of what shots to show an audience, Williams wanted to "take that person out of the equation" and present an unmediated look at the band members. U2's management and concert promoters were skeptical at first, but Williams said that after it was seen in action, it was a "complete no-brainer". He expected it to be one of the most influential aspects of the tour. According to him, the easiest solution would have been to eliminate IMAG altogether, but it was "deemed necessary" because of the size of some indoor venues and the high cost of tickets.

Projection factored heavily into the shows' visuals. The tour used four PIGI projectors from E\T\C Audiovisuel placed in the corners of each venue. The projectors used a 7K bulb with a 7-inch (180 mm), square aperture, producing an "enormous amount of light", according to Williams. Instead of projecting the imagery onto a screen, Williams had the idea to project it across the entire interior space of the venues. Each projector was positioned on its back and aimed upwards at a mirror that was operated by a crew member to direct the reflection around the venue.

Williams enlisted visual artist Catherine Owens to create the artwork used for the projectors and the videowall. Most of the projection imagery was hand-drawn, much of it directly to film, though some artwork was computer-generated. Owens worked with a team of four artists to create the artwork. The projection graphics were generally abstract and textural; Williams said the look of it borrowed heavily from rave culture. For the concluding song "Walk On", he handwrote the lyrics from the song's closing refrain onto the projector film and reversed it, allowing the words to "scroll over the audience and run like closing credits". The wide dimensions of the videowall posed challenges for Owens's team, as they had to re-aspect much of the artwork without it looking squashed. A large amount of the videowall artwork was created onsite during tour rehearsals. During that time, the artists were given access to one of Media 100's editing suites in London, where they created images on a PowerBook G3 laptop and could instantly view them on the videowall. The process allowed Owens's team to solicit artistic ideas from the band and turn them around within a single afternoon.

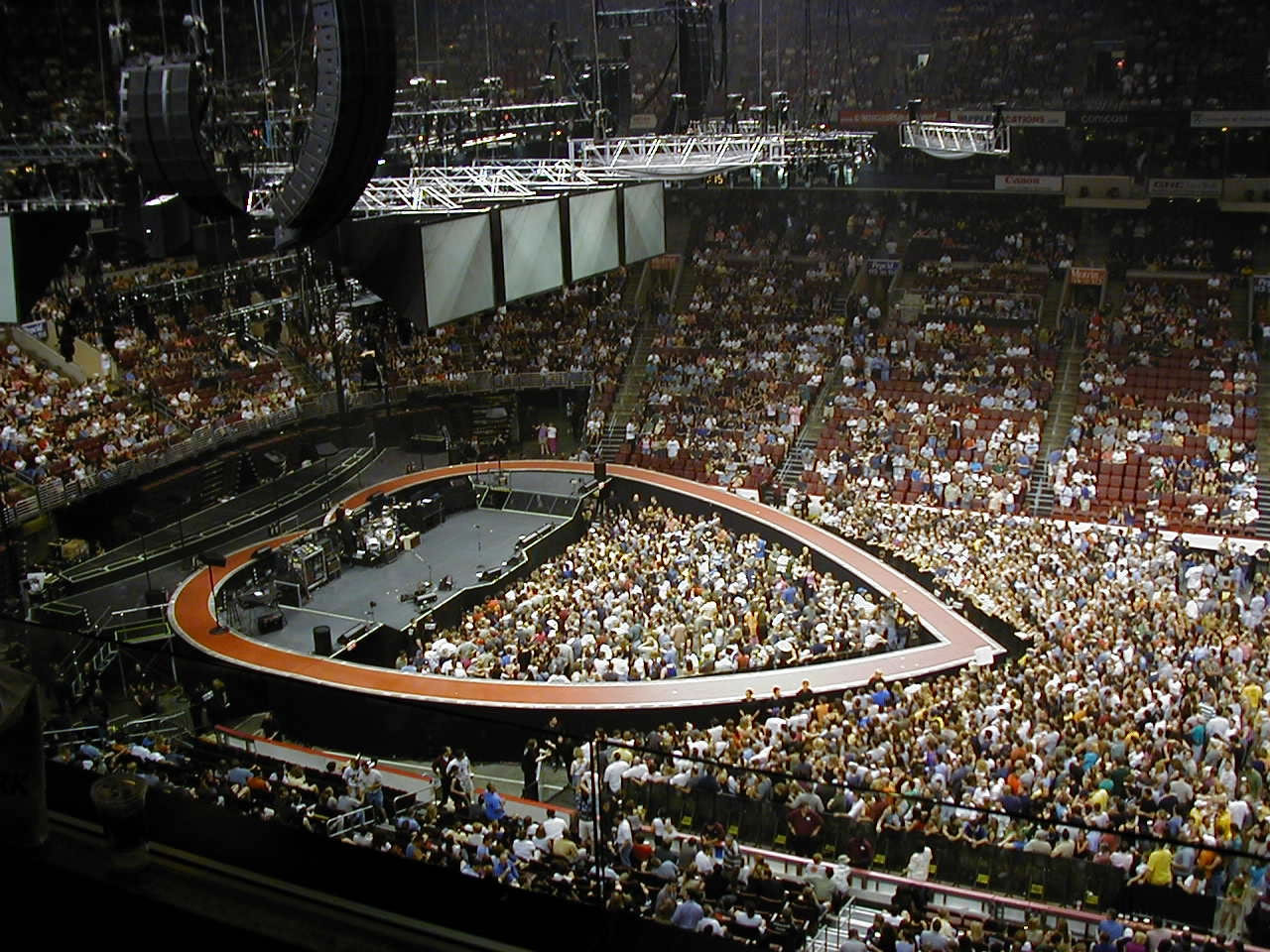
The stage before a June 2001 concert in Philadelphia. The overhead speaker and lighting systems are visible.

Equipment for the sound system was provided by Clair Brothers Audio, which had a long-standing relationship with the band. The primary front-facing speaker arrays at stage left and right each featured 14 of Clair Brothers' i4 cabinets, variously angled at 2°, 5°, and 10°. Directly adjacent to these arrays were Clair Brothers' i4B subwoofers; 24 cabinets were used in total. For sidefill, each side of the venues was covered by a column of eight speaker cabinets, while the rear of the stage was covered by two arrays of six cabinets arranged in 10° increments. For the general admission audience inside the heart, P-2 speakers were positioned on top of ML18 bass cabinets under the front of the stage, and a cluster of three P-4 speakers was center hung overhead. Sound engineer Joe O'Herlihy mixed the sound on a Midas XL4 automated console, and used a Yamaha O2R console for overflow inputs.

For the stage monitor system, the band members utilised a combination of in-ear monitors by Future Sonics and monitor speakers by Clair Brothers. For Clayton, a single 12-AM wedge was placed near his "pocket" position at the corner of the drum riser, while a pair of "double-12s" was placed at the front of the stage. For the rest of the band, a pair of 12-AM wedges was used by Bono, a pair of Series II wedges by guitarist the Edge, and a pair of ML18 bass speakers by drummer Larry Mullen Jr. On each side of the backline, a P-4 cabinet was laid on its side atop ML18 units, which were angled inwards for sidefill. At the front of each wing of the stage, a "double-12" was placed, and on each side of the rear apron were a wedge and two subwoofers. The monitors were mixed by engineers Don Garber and Dave Skaff on two ATI Paragon consoles, with a Yamaha 02R and Mackie 1604 console used for audience microphones and talkback inputs from crew members. Skaff mixed for Clayton and Mullen, while Garber mixed for Bono and the Edge. Their mixing position was underneath the left wing of the stage, without a line of sight to the band; as a result, they tracked the band members on video monitors, which displayed the same feed as the on-stage video screens.

Williams served as the lighting designer with Bruce Ramus as lighting director. The lighting system was configured in a manner that followed the tour's "forward to basics" theme. Ramus said that the lighting truss design was simplified, as the team wanted to move away from clever designs. Four straight trusses were suspended above the main stage, two measuring 48 feet (15 m) long and two measuring 54 feet (16 m) long. Seven Vario-Lift hoists by ChainMaster could raise and lower the trusses to trim heights varying from 50 feet (15 m) to 12 feet (3.7 m) high. A 20-foot (6.1 m) diameter circular truss was suspended above the general admission area inside the heart. The lighting system used 54 Vari-Lite VL2416 wash luminaires; they were the only automated light fixtures used on tour, and marked U2's first time using Vari-Lite products. Williams chose the fixture for its zoom control and brightness, allowing him to achieve a 55-foot (17 m) throw distance. For a footlight, the heart-shaped ramp had 300 T3 quartz bulbs embedded in 6-inch (150 mm) gutters on both sides, along with about 400 Egg Strobe and Star Strobe lights.

Early in the tour, the lighting system featured 24 Fresnel fixtures with gold-painted barn doors for a "pleasantly stylish, Gucci feel". These fixtures dominated the first part of the show, illuminating at about 50 percent to produce what Williams called a "wonderful brown, low color temperature light which the band loved". As the tour progressed, Bono felt they were too nostalgic among the more contemporary elements of the show, while Williams thought they were being underused. As a result, the Fresnels were replaced with eight custom fixtures called "fornows"; designed by Williams on a napkin, they were constructed by Light & Sound Design (LSD) and each housed a four-DWE Mole striplight in a short, deep wedge-shaped box. Williams felt the "fornows" befitted the show better, emitting light that was "less friendly and more aggressive". Among several unconventional fixtures in the lighting system were 30 modified police beacons, which were placed sideways in groups and whose movements were staggered with each other to create a "rain effect" during "Where the Streets Have No Name" to stun the audience. At the corners of the stage were four custom-built "ripple drums" by LSD; Williams described the pieces as slowly rotating black trash cans with holes in them and "a naked 5kW fixture" inside. The lighting package also included 48 LSD DWE Mole striplights, 24 ETC Source Four fixtures, 12 Omni fixtures and 70 Tota fixtures by Lowel-Light, and a variety of strobe lamps. Williams controlled lights with an Avolites Pearl console, while Ramus operated a Jands Hog 1000 console.

The stage and equipment travelled on 14 semi-trailer trucks, and required two hours to disassemble and load into the trucks.

== Tour overview ==
During promotional appearances for the tour and All That You Can't Leave Behind, lead vocalist Bono often said, "We're back, re-applying for the job ... And the job is best band in the world." This was in response to the relatively low sales of Pop and sometimes poor reception of the PopMart Tour.

The European leg of the Elevation Tour was also presented in arenas. However, several outdoor shows were played due to logistics and facility requirements. These included both of the Slane Castle shows, which were part of Ireland's annual Slane Concert. For these two performances, the "heart" was extended and widened in order to accommodate the larger attendance. The Turin show was played in a football stadium, with a black U-shaped semicircle extending out into the crowd instead of the heart. The Berlin show was performed in a natural outdoor arena with a tent-like structure supporting all the band's flown gear such as speaker stacks and lighting rigs. Due to the limited amount of space available for production, the top of the heart was placed at the front of the stage. During this leg, Bono regularly flew back to Dublin after each show to be with his dying father.

The third leg of the tour began in the U.S. only a month after the September 11, 2001 attacks and in the midst of the 2001 anthrax attacks. This nearly led U2 to cancel the leg, but they decided to continue, starting it at the University of Notre Dame in Notre Dame, Indiana, home of the "Fighting Irish". While some fans shied away from coming to an ordinarily celebratory occasion or to a large, enclosed public gathering, many other fans did not let these events stop them. The tenor of the times dramatically affected the temperament of the shows, with Marvin Gaye's "What's Going On" appearing frequently in the setlist and the band's "Walk On" taking on added emotional weight.

=== Setlists ===
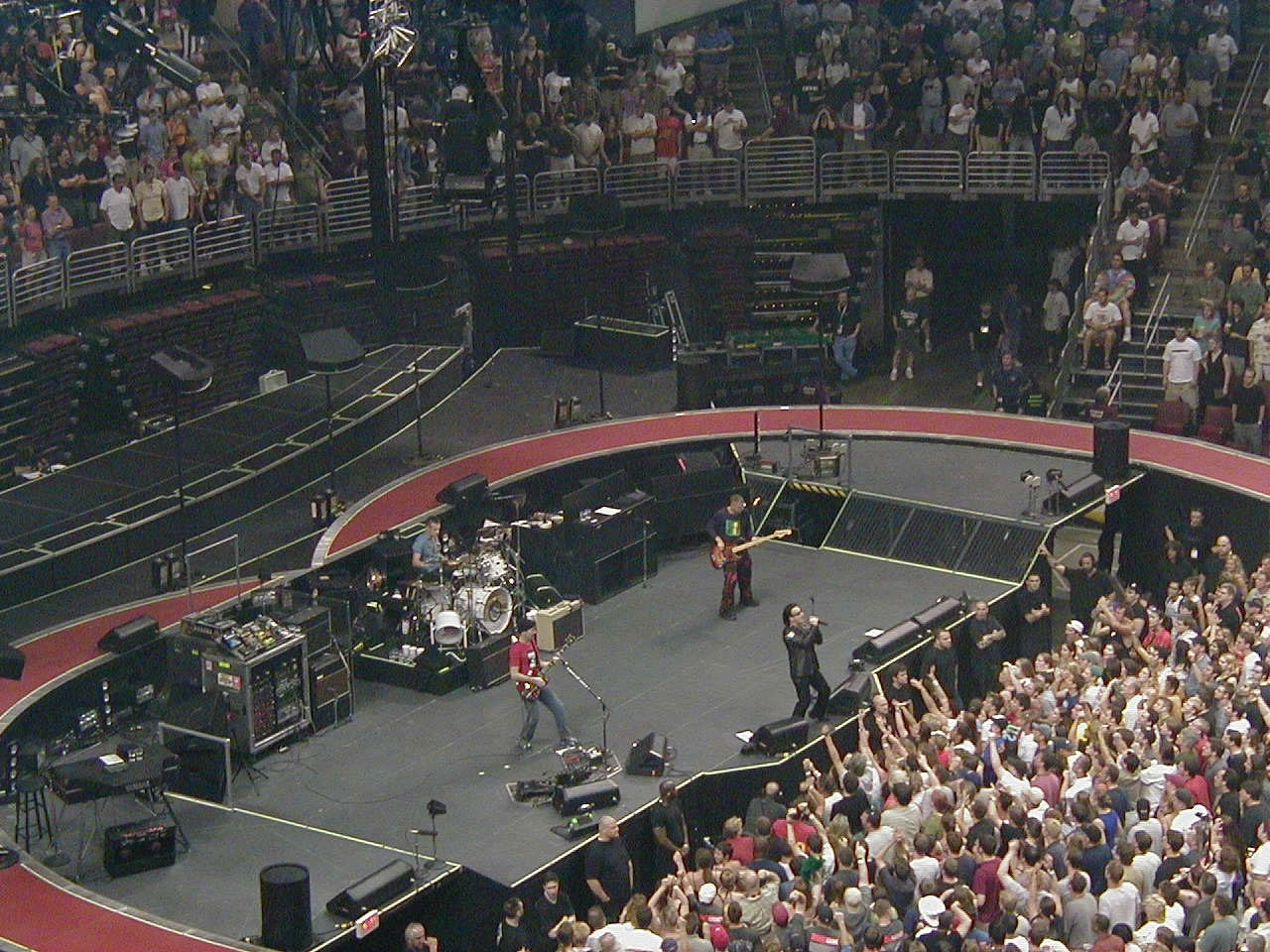
U2 began concerts on the tour by performing "Elevation" with the venue's house lights on.

Shows would traditionally open under the venue house lights with the Influx mix of "Elevation" playing as the band's intro music. "Elevation", the tour's title track, would then kick off the show, and would then be normally followed up by "Beautiful Day", "Until the End of the World" and "New Year's Day". Occasionally, "Discothèque" or "Mysterious Ways" followed "Until the End of the World" instead of "New Year's Day".

For the first two legs, most shows would then use "Kite", "Gone" and "New York" early in the setlist. Sometimes "Discothèque" or "Even Better Than the Real Thing" was played between "Gone" and "New York". All tour shows would see "Stuck in a Moment You Can't Get Out Of" and "Sunday Bloody Sunday" Normally, one out of "I Will Follow", "Out of Control" and "11 O'Clock Tick Tock" would be played before "Sunday Bloody Sunday". "In a Little While" would then normally be played (sometimes "Sweetest Thing" or "Wake up Dead Man" would be played), and that would be followed by a full band acoustic rendition of "Desire" and then an acoustic song, normally "Stay (Faraway, So Close!)". Sometimes "The Ground Beneath Her Feet", "Staring at the Sun" or a cover of "I Remember You" by The Ramones would be played instead.

The acoustic song would then normally be followed by the live favourite "Bad", which had appeared few times on the previous PopMart Tour. On occasions, "All I Want Is You" would be played instead. "Where the Streets Have No Name" followed, which was played at every concert. Normally, the band would then play "Mysterious Ways" with snippets of "Sexual Healing" at the end of the song and a new version of "The Fly" with the Edge playing guitar and Bono performing at the end of the heart catwalk. On occasions, "The Fly" would be replaced by "Pride (In the Name of Love)". After playing either "The Fly" or "Pride", the main set would end and the band would leave the stage.

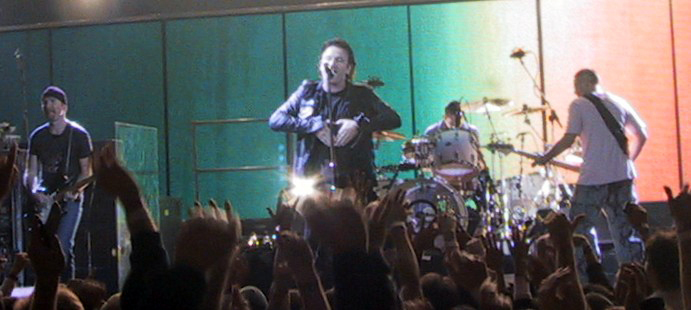
U2 in concert of the Elevation Tour

U2 would then open the encore with "Bullet the Blue Sky", usually accompanied by Bono protesting against gun crime and giving a speech against handgun crime, while using a smaller version of the spotlight he used on The Joshua Tree Tour. "Bullet" would then be followed by "With or Without You". The band would then normally play "One", which was played at every concert. On occasions in the first leg, the band played "Pride" or "The Fly" between "With or Without You" and "One" with the other one of those two songs played after "Mysterious Ways" at the end of the main set. "Wake up Dead Man" was sometimes played after "One", if not after "Sunday Bloody Sunday". "Walk On" would then be played as the outright show closer.

The third leg saw some alterations to the setlist to reflect the much more emotionally poignant times that existed within America in the wake of the September 11th attacks. After opening with the same trio that they opened the first two legs with, the band would then most commonly play "New Year's Day", "I Will Follow" or "Out of Control", "Sunday Bloody Sunday", "Stuck in a Moment You Can't Get Out Of" and "Kite". "Angel of Harlem" also made appearances either before or after "Kite".

The band's acoustic slot was moved forward, with "In a Little While" dropped altogether and the acoustic slot taking place after "Kite". Normally, "Wild Honey" and "Please" were played. "Please" also made one appearance in its electric form, in a similar style to its PopMart performance when it segued into "Where the Streets Have No Name". "I Still Haven't Found What I'm Looking For", played only once during the first two legs, was given a regular slot between "Where the Streets Have No Name" and "Pride (In the Name of Love)" during the third leg, taking the place of "Mysterious Ways".

The encore once again contained "Bullet the Blue Sky", "One" and "Walk On". Instead of playing "With or Without You" between "Bullet" and "One" as they did on the first two legs, the band instead played a cover of Marvin Gaye's "What's Going On" and "New York". A few times, the band played "Peace on Earth" between "One" and "Walk On".

Overall, 53 different songs were played by U2 during the tour, with six songs ("Elevation", "Beautiful Day", "Stuck in a Moment You Can't Get Out Of", "Sunday Bloody Sunday", "Where the Streets Have No Name" and "One") played at all 113 concerts. Three tracks ("Bullet the Blue Sky", "Until the End of the World", and "Walk On") were played at all but one show apiece on the tour.

== Super Bowl performance ==
On 3 February 2002, the band performed a three-song set during the halftime show of Super Bowl XXXVI. The heart-shaped stage from the Elevation Tour was recreated for the band's halftime performance. The show began with "Beautiful Day", as Bono walked to the stage through the on-field crowd. For the final two songs, "MLK" and "Where the Streets Have No Name", the names of the victims from the September 11 attacks were projected onto a vertical scrim behind the stage as well as across the interior of the Louisiana Superdome. At the end of the performance, Bono opened his jacket, which he had worn throughout the Elevation Tour, to reveal an American flag in the lining, an image that was widely reproduced in the media. Sports Illustrated ranked it as the best halftime show in Super Bowl history.

== Concert broadcasts and releases ==
Two concert videos of the Elevation Tour were released on DVD, both directed by Hamish Hamilton. The first, Elevation 2001: Live from Boston, was released in November 2001, and included material from three different shows filmed in June 2001 in Boston at the FleetCenter. One of the concerts, the 6 June show, was partially televised on NBC during halftime of Game 1 of the 2001 NBA Finals; the network aired a live performance of "Where the Streets Have No Name", followed by a pre-recorded performance of "Elevation" from earlier. The Elevation 2001 video was televised on VH1 on 24 November and on DirecTV on 2 December.

The second concert video, U2 Go Home: Live from Slane Castle, Ireland, was released in November 2003. Filmed on 1 September 2001, it captured the outdoor variant of the Elevation Tour at the band's Slane Concert.

== Reception ==
The first two legs of the Elevation Tour sold out all 83 concerts across North America and Europe and grossed US$105 million. The band's two concerts at Slane Castle sold 157,418 tickets and grossed $6.7 million. The Elevation Tour was 2001's top-earning North American tour with a gross of $109.7 million, the second-highest ever at the time for a North American tour. Globally, it grossed $143,472,379 from 2,179,642 tickets sold, making it the year's highest-grossing tour overall. Spin named U2 the "Band of the Year" for 2001, saying they had "schooled bands half their age about what a rock show could really accomplish".

At the 13th annual Pollstar Concert Industry Awards, U2 were honored with awards for Major Tour of the Year and Most Creative Stage Production, while Paul McGuinness was recognized as Personal Manager of the Year. Willie Williams won a 2001 EDDY Award from Entertainment Design magazine for his work as the tour's show director; the magazine said, "While U2's current Elevation tour is striking in its simplicity, Williams created an almost complete amalgamation of lighting and video by using the entire space of each arena as a projection surface." At the 2002 TEC Awards, the Elevation Tour crew won for Outstanding Creative Achievement in Tour Production; among those recognised were Clair Brothers as the tour company, Joe O'Herlihy as the front of house engineer, and Don Garber, Raza Sufi, Niall Slevin, and Dave Skaff as monitor engineers.

== Tour dates ==
List of concerts from leg 1 (North America)
Date (2001)	City	Country	Venue	Opening act	Attendance (tickets sold / total available)	Revenue
24 March	Sunrise	United States	National Car Rental Center	The Corrs	37,969 / 37,969	$3,032,028
26 March	Sunrise	United States	National Car Rental Center	The Corrs	37,969 / 37,969	$3,032,028
29 March	Charlotte	United States	Charlotte Coliseum	Nelly Furtado	19,054 / 19,054	$1,447,355
30 March	Atlanta	United States	Philips Arena	Nelly Furtado	20,596 / 20,596	$1,500,277
2 April	Houston	United States	Compaq Center	PJ Harvey	14,859 / 14,859	$1,198,589
3 April	Dallas	United States	Reunion Arena	PJ Harvey	18,166 / 18,166	$1,450,655
6 April	Denver	United States	Pepsi Center	PJ Harvey	18,462 / 18,462	$1,509,290
9 April	Calgary	Canada	Pengrowth Saddledome	PJ Harvey	35,778 / 35,778	$1,824,131
10 April	Calgary	Canada	Pengrowth Saddledome	PJ Harvey	35,778 / 35,778	$1,824,131
12 April	Tacoma	United States	Tacoma Dome	PJ Harvey	21,807 / 21,807	$1,671,880
13 April	Vancouver	Canada	General Motors Place	PJ Harvey	18,520 / 18,520	$960,419
15 April	Portland	United States	Rose Garden	PJ Harvey	16,653 / 16,653	$1,276,120
17 April	San Diego	United States	San Diego Sports Arena	PJ Harvey	14,850 / 14,850	$1,237,115
19 April	San Jose	United States	San Jose Arena	PJ Harvey	35,550 / 35,550	$2,878,940
20 April	San Jose	United States	San Jose Arena	PJ Harvey	35,550 / 35,550	$2,878,940
23 April	Anaheim	United States	Arrowhead Pond of Anaheim	PJ Harvey	49,377 / 49,377	$4,152,640
24 April	Anaheim	United States	Arrowhead Pond of Anaheim	PJ Harvey	49,377 / 49,377	$4,152,640
26 April	Anaheim	United States	Arrowhead Pond of Anaheim	PJ Harvey	49,377 / 49,377	$4,152,640
28 April	Phoenix	United States	America West Arena	PJ Harvey	17,575 / 17,575	$1,424,390
1 May	Minneapolis	United States	Target Center	PJ Harvey	18,691 / 18,691	$1,465,425
3 May	Cleveland	United States	Gund Arena	PJ Harvey	18,763 / 18,763	$1,492,460
4 May	Lexington	United States	Rupp Arena	PJ Harvey	16,642 / 16,642	$1,143,878
6 May	Pittsburgh	United States	Mellon Arena	PJ Harvey	14,863 / 14,863	$1,225,160
7 May	Columbus	United States	Nationwide Arena	PJ Harvey	15,495 / 15,495	$1,284,930
9 May	Milwaukee	United States	Bradley Center	PJ Harvey	18,622 / 18,622	$1,433,435
10 May	Indianapolis	United States	Conseco Fieldhouse	PJ Harvey	15,088 / 15,088	$1,210,988
12 May	Chicago	United States	United Center	PJ Harvey	78,275 / 78,275	$6,393,525
13 May	Chicago	United States	United Center	PJ Harvey	78,275 / 78,275	$6,393,525
15 May	Chicago	United States	United Center	PJ Harvey	78,275 / 78,275	$6,393,525
16 May	Chicago	United States	United Center	PJ Harvey	78,275 / 78,275	$6,393,525
24 May	Toronto	Canada	Air Canada Centre	PJ Harvey	39,048 / 39,048	$2,096,034
25 May	Toronto	Canada	Air Canada Centre	PJ Harvey	39,048 / 39,048	$2,096,034
27 May	Montreal	Canada	Molson Centre	PJ Harvey	42,198 / 42,198	$2,090,423
28 May	Montreal	Canada	Molson Centre	PJ Harvey	42,198 / 42,198	$2,090,423
30 May	Auburn Hills	United States	The Palace of Auburn Hills	PJ Harvey	21,173 / 21,173	$1,638,325
31 May	Buffalo	United States	HSBC Arena	PJ Harvey	18,434 / 18,434	$1,422,510
2 June	Albany	United States	Pepsi Arena	PJ Harvey	15,515 / 15,515	$1,215,470
3 June	Hartford	United States	Hartford Civic Center	PJ Harvey	15,717 / 15,717	$1,244,825
5 June	Boston	United States	FleetCenter	PJ Harvey	68,139 / 68,139	$5,620,260
6 June	Boston	United States	FleetCenter	PJ Harvey	68,139 / 68,139	$5,620,260
8 June	Boston	United States	FleetCenter	PJ Harvey	68,139 / 68,139	$5,620,260
9 June	Boston	United States	FleetCenter	PJ Harvey	68,139 / 68,139	$5,620,260
11 June	Philadelphia	United States	First Union Center	PJ Harvey	38,536 / 38,536	$3,076,345
12 June	Philadelphia	United States	First Union Center	PJ Harvey	38,536 / 38,536	$3,076,345
14 June	Washington, D.C.	United States	MCI Center	PJ Harvey	37,971 / 37,917	$3,172,418
15 June	Washington, D.C.	United States	MCI Center	PJ Harvey	37,971 / 37,917	$3,172,418
17 June	New York City	United States	Madison Square Garden	PJ Harvey	36,632 / 36,632	$3,141,260
19 June	New York City	United States	Madison Square Garden	PJ Harvey	36,632 / 36,632	$3,141,260
21 June	East Rutherford	United States	Continental Airlines Arena	PJ Harvey	39,282 / 39,282	$3,205,680
22 June	East Rutherford	United States	Continental Airlines Arena	PJ Harvey	39,282 / 39,282	$3,205,680

List of concerts from leg 2 (Europe)
Date (2001)	City	Country	Venue	Opening act	Attendance (tickets sold / total available)	Revenue
6 July	Copenhagen	Denmark	Forum Copenhagen	Stereophonics	20,000 / 20,000	$1,107,040
7 July	Copenhagen	Denmark	Forum Copenhagen	JJ72	20,000 / 20,000	$1,107,040
9 July	Stockholm	Sweden	The Globe	Stereophonics	31,511 / 31,511	$1,269,775
10 July	Stockholm	Sweden	The Globe	Stereophonics	31,511 / 31,511	$1,269,775
12 July	Cologne	Germany	Kölnarena	Söhne Mannheims	36,915 / 36,915	$1,701,438
13 July	Cologne	Germany	Kölnarena	Söhne Mannheims	36,915 / 36,915	$1,701,438
15 July	Munich	Germany	Olympiahalle	Söhne Mannheims	13,543 / 13,543	$602,819
17 July	Paris	France	Palais Omnisports de Paris-Bercy	Stereophonics	34,000 / 34,000	$1,737,977
18 July	Paris	France	Palais Omnisports de Paris-Bercy	Stereophonics	34,000 / 34,000	$1,737,977
21 July	Turin	Italy	Stadio delle Alpi	Timoria; Verdena; Fun Lovin' Criminals	73,061 / 73,061	$2,616,225
23 July	Zürich	Switzerland	Hallenstadion	Kelis	26,000 / 26,000	$1,107,246
24 July	Zürich	Switzerland	Hallenstadion	Kelis	26,000 / 26,000	$1,107,246
26 July	Vienna	Austria	Wiener Stadthalle	Kelis	32,148 / 32,148	$1,213,120
27 July	Vienna	Austria	Wiener Stadthalle	Kelis	32,148 / 32,148	$1,213,120
29 July	Berlin	Germany	Waldbühne	Michael Mittermeier	20,030 / 20,030	$856,742
31 July	Arnhem	Netherlands	GelreDome	Kelis	107,812 / 107,812	$4,015,276
1 August	Arnhem	Netherlands	GelreDome	Kelis	107,812 / 107,812	$4,015,276
3 August	Arnhem	Netherlands	GelreDome	Kelis	107,812 / 107,812	$4,015,276
5 August	Antwerp	Belgium	Sportpaleis	Stereophonics	32,878 / 32,878	$1,092,552
6 August	Antwerp	Belgium	Sportpaleis	Stereophonics	32,878 / 32,878	$1,092,552
8 August	Barcelona	Spain	Palau Sant Jordi	Stereophonics	18,000 / 18,000	$748,498
11 August	Manchester	England	Manchester Evening News Arena	Kelis	38,742 / 38,742	$2,073,724
12 August	Manchester	England	Manchester Evening News Arena	Kelis	38,742 / 38,742	$2,073,724
14 August	Birmingham	England	NEC Arena	Kelis	23,022 / 23,022	$1,255,635
15 August	Birmingham	England	NEC Arena	Kelis	23,022 / 23,022	$1,255,635
18 August	London	England	Earls Court Exhibition Centre	Kelis	73,742 / 73,742	$4,475,265
19 August	London	England	Earls Court Exhibition Centre	PJ Harvey	73,742 / 73,742	$4,475,265
21 August	London	England	Earls Court Exhibition Centre	Nelly Furtado	73,742 / 73,742	$4,475,265
22 August	London	England	Earls Court Exhibition Centre	JJ72	73,742 / 73,742	$4,475,265
25 August	Slane	Ireland	Slane Castle	Relish; JJ72; Kelis; Coldplay; Red Hot Chili Peppers	157,418 / 157,418 (Note: The score data is representative of the two shows at the Slane Castle on August 25 and September 1 respectively.)	$6,683,996
27 August	Glasgow	Scotland	Scottish Exhibition and Conference Centre	Cosmic Rough Riders	19,231 / 19,231	$1,029,914
28 August	Glasgow	Scotland	Scottish Exhibition and Conference Centre	Cosmic Rough Riders	19,231 / 19,231	$1,029,914
1 September	Slane	Ireland	Slane Castle	Ash; Moby; Nelly Furtado; The Walls; Dara	—	—

List of concerts from leg 3 (North America)
Date (2001)	City	Country	Venue	Opening act	Attendance (tickets sold / total available)	Revenue
10 October	Notre Dame	United States	Edmund P. Joyce Center	Garbage	11,441 / 11,441	$774,685
12 October	Montreal	Canada	Molson Centre	Garbage	21,063 / 21,063	$1,028,673
13 October	Hamilton	Canada	Copps Coliseum	Garbage	18,486 / 18,486	$984,912
15 October	Chicago	United States	United Center	Garbage	39,368 / 39,368	$3,206,600
16 October	Chicago	United States	United Center	Garbage	39,368 / 39,368	$3,206,600
19 October	Baltimore	United States	Baltimore Arena	Graham Parker	13,510 / 13,510	$1,131,610
24 October	New York City	United States	Madison Square Garden	Garbage; No Doubt; Stereophonics	55,155 / 55,155	$4,706,370
25 October	New York City	United States	Madison Square Garden	Garbage; No Doubt; Stereophonics	55,155 / 55,155	$4,706,370
27 October	New York City	United States	Madison Square Garden	Garbage; No Doubt; Stereophonics	55,155 / 55,155	$4,706,370
28 October	East Rutherford	United States	Continental Airlines Arena	Stereophonics	19,589 / 19,589	$1,596,735
30 October	Providence	United States	Dunkin' Donuts Center	Stereophonics	26,575 / 26,575	$2,269,218
31 October	Providence	United States	Dunkin' Donuts Center	Stereophonics	26,575 / 26,575	$2,269,218
2 November	Philadelphia	United States	First Union Center	Stereophonics	19,320 / 19,320	$1,541,360
5 November	Austin	United States	Frank Erwin Center	No Doubt	16,585 / 16,585	$1,083,525
7 November	Denver	United States	Pepsi Center	No Doubt	18,432 / 18,432	$1,505,225
9 November	Salt Lake City	United States	Delta Center	No Doubt	17,197 / 17,197	$1,347,245
12 November	Los Angeles	United States	Staples Center	No Doubt	33,448 / 33,448	$2,987,433
13 November	Los Angeles	United States	Staples Center	No Doubt	33,448 / 33,448	$2,987,433
15 November	Oakland	United States	The Arena in Oakland	No Doubt	35,546 / 35,546	$2,920,335
16 November	Oakland	United States	The Arena in Oakland	No Doubt	35,546 / 35,546	$2,920,335
18 November	Las Vegas	United States	Thomas & Mack Center	No Doubt	17,999 / 17,999	$1,497,148
19 November	Los Angeles	United States	Staples Center	No Doubt	16,724 / 16,724	$1,493,716
20 November	Sacramento	United States	ARCO Arena	No Doubt	13,789 / 13,789	$1,139,145
23 November	Phoenix	United States	America West Arena	No Doubt	17,106 / 17,106	$1,385,805
25 November	Dallas	United States	Reunion Arena	No Doubt	17,489 / 17,489	$1,417,350
27 November	Kansas City	United States	Kemper Arena	Garbage	13,456 / 13,456	$1,106,456
28 November	St. Louis	United States	Savvis Center	Garbage	16,051 / 16,051	$1,269,365
30 November	Atlanta	United States	Philips Arena	Garbage	18,535 / 18,535	$1,504,925
1 December	Tampa	United States	Ice Palace	Garbage	16,494 / 16,494	$1,339,865
2 December	Miami	United States	American Airlines Arena	Garbage	16,197 / 16,197	$1,350,595
Totals for entire tour					2,179,642	$143,472,379

== See also ==
- List of highest grossing concert tours
- Timeline of U2
