= In a Little While =

2000 song by U2

Song by U2

from the album All That You Can't Leave Behind
- Released: 2000
- Genre: Rock
- Length: 3:39
- Label: Island, Interscope
- Composer: U2
- Lyricist: Bono
- Producers: Brian Eno and Daniel Lanois, with additional production by Richard Stannard and Julian Gallagher

"In a Little While" is a song by Irish rock band U2 and the sixth track on their 10th studio album, All That You Can't Leave Behind (2000). Although it was not released as a single from the album, it became a hit on adult album alternative radio in the United States, reaching number one on the Billboard Triple-A chart for a single week in March 2002.

== Writing and recording ==
The title "In a Little While" originated as a line that co-producer Brian Eno had been toying with but not found a use for before giving it to U2. The vocals of lead singer Bono were quickly developed in a couple of improvised takes after he arrived at the studio hungover and with very little voice after a "very big night out on the town" and only two hours of sleep. Guitarist the Edge said that Bono sang "this incredible improvised lyric and melody", while Bono described his voice as one "that was up all night". The Edge achieved a clean guitar tone from plugging his 1950s Fender Stratocaster directly into a Fender Bassman amplifier. After the band was done with the track, the Edge said they found it too traditional and not unique enough. As a result, they took it to Windmill Lane Studios for Richard Stannard to work on. Stannard stripped the song down from its layers, found a section of the rhythm track that he liked, and added it as a loop over drummer Larry Mullen Jr.'s drums. The change solidified the song and validated the band's revamped songwriting approach of "build[ing] up the material organically, and then add[ing] more modern elements on top of it", rather than building songs from electronics.

The lyrics are addressed to Bono's wife, Ali Hewson. Bono said that when they were younger, people at school used to call him a "baby-snatcher" for dating a girl a year younger than him. She is referenced in the lines "A little girl with Spanish eyes, when I saw her first in a pram they pushed her by / Oh my, my how you've grown". Bono said that his idea for the song was "the temporal nature of being", but that setting it during a hangover added "comedy and earthiness that balances the philosophical pretensions". Midway through the song is a lyrical tangent that includes the lines "A man dreams one day to fly / A man takes a rocket ship into the sky". The section was informed by Bono reminiscing at the turn of the millennium about the awe he felt over technological marvels such as man landing on the Moon as well as his frustration with the lack of progress in solving world problems like poverty and disease.

== Live performances ==
The song was played at over half of the shows on the Elevation Tour. It was played for most of the first leg, about half of the second leg, and not at all on the third leg. On the live concert film, Elevation 2001: Live from Boston, Bono introduces the song by explaining it was the last song Joey Ramone heard on his deathbed. He notes his honour of having one of his favorite musicians loving a song of his. Bono said that it became a gospel song after he heard about Ramone, and U2 subsequently dedicated the song to him for the rest of the tour.

The Killers' frontman Brandon Flowers performed the song as a duet with Bono in Las Vegas in 2006 on the Vertigo Tour. This was one of only two performances of the song on the Vertigo Tour. However, it was snippeted almost forty times during performances of "I Still Haven't Found What I'm Looking For".

During the performance of "In a Little While", U2 made contact with Belgian astronaut Frank DeWinne who read the lyrics.

The song was also played several times during the U2 360° Tour. During the YouTube live-streamed concert from the Rose Bowl, released on the 2010 U2360° at the Rose Bowl concert video, lyrics from "In a Little While" were read by Belgian astronaut Frank DeWinne from the International Space Station.

== Personnel ==
U2

- Bono – vocals
- The Edge – guitar
- Adam Clayton – bass guitar
- Larry Mullen Jr. – drums, percussion

Additional musicians

- Brian Eno – keyboards
- Daniel Lanois – guitar

== Charts ==
=== Weekly charts ===
Chart (2002)	Peak position
US Adult Alternative Airplay (Billboard)	1

=== Year-end charts ===
Chart (2002)	Position
US Triple-A (Billboard)	11

== See also ==
- List of covers of U2 songs - In a Little While
