= Sabine Seymour =

- Education: Vienna University of Economics and Business
- Occupations: Director of the fashionable technology lab at parsons the new school for design, ceo of moondial inc.

Sabine Seymour is a designer, author, entrepreneur, and researcher, known for her work in fashionable technology and design. (10.1371/journal.pone.0184311) She is the director of the Fashionable Technology Lab and Assistant Professor of Fashionable Technology at Parsons the New School for Design. Seymour is the founder of Moondial Inc., a consulting company specializing in the integration of technology and fabrics.Sabine was born and raised in Austria.

Seymour, an athlete passionate about snowboarding, especially enjoys off-piste riding. Her athletic personality has inspired and influenced her interests in fashion and in exploring the connection between our bodies and the external world. Her fascination with gadgets and integrated functions was already evident in her first creation, where she designed a helmet that acted as a game controller, in 1996. Between January 1998 and 2019, she authored 23 publications affiliated with the University of Arts and Industrial Design Linz.

== Education ==
Seymour received a PhD and MSc in Social and Economic Sciences from the Vienna University of Economics and Columbia University in New York, and a MPS in Interactive Telecommunications from New York University.

== Research ==
Seymour is the Director of the Fashionable Technology Lab at Parsons The New School for Design and Assistant Professor in Fashionable technology. She is an editorial review board member of the International Journal of Mobile Human Computer Interaction and chairs the Rockefeller Foundation Grant–funded project Computational Fashion at Eyebeam Art+Technology Center, New York. Seymour has received numerous grants and awards, including the Michael Kalil Endowment for Smart Design Fellowship.

Seymour has published Fashionable Technology: The Intersection of Design, Fashion, Science, and Technology (Springer, 2008) and Functional Aesthetics: Visions in Fashionable Technology (Springer, 2010).

Seymour was previously a design co-chair for ISWC and a jury member for the Prix Ars Electronica, a visiting researcher for Computational Cellulose at Aalto University, Helsinki, a curator of the MAK Fashion Lab at the Museum of Applied Arts, Vienna, a co-director of the research project BODYMetaphor at the New School, New York, and a steering committee member for Zero Power Smart Fashion, New York.

== Entrepreneurship ==
Seymour is the founder of Moondial Inc., a consulting firm that focuses on intelligent clothing, concepts and creative direction for online or networked environments, strategies for the integration of wireless technologies in clothing and equipment, go-to-market strategies for wearable products, and trend scouting. Moondial works for clients such as Motorola, Johnson Controls, Intel, and North Face.

In 2015, Seymour introduced a prototype for a new technology called "Soft Spot" that would integrate sensor technology into fabrics. This technology has since been incorporated into a company named "Supa Spot."

In 2017, Seymour was preparing the Supa Powered Sports Bra connected to a removable heart rate monitor, linked to a app on the users phone where they can track their heart beat. Seymour chose for removable sensors to make the technology easier to produce at scale.
