= Pantograph (lighting suspension) =

Overhead suspension system for television studios

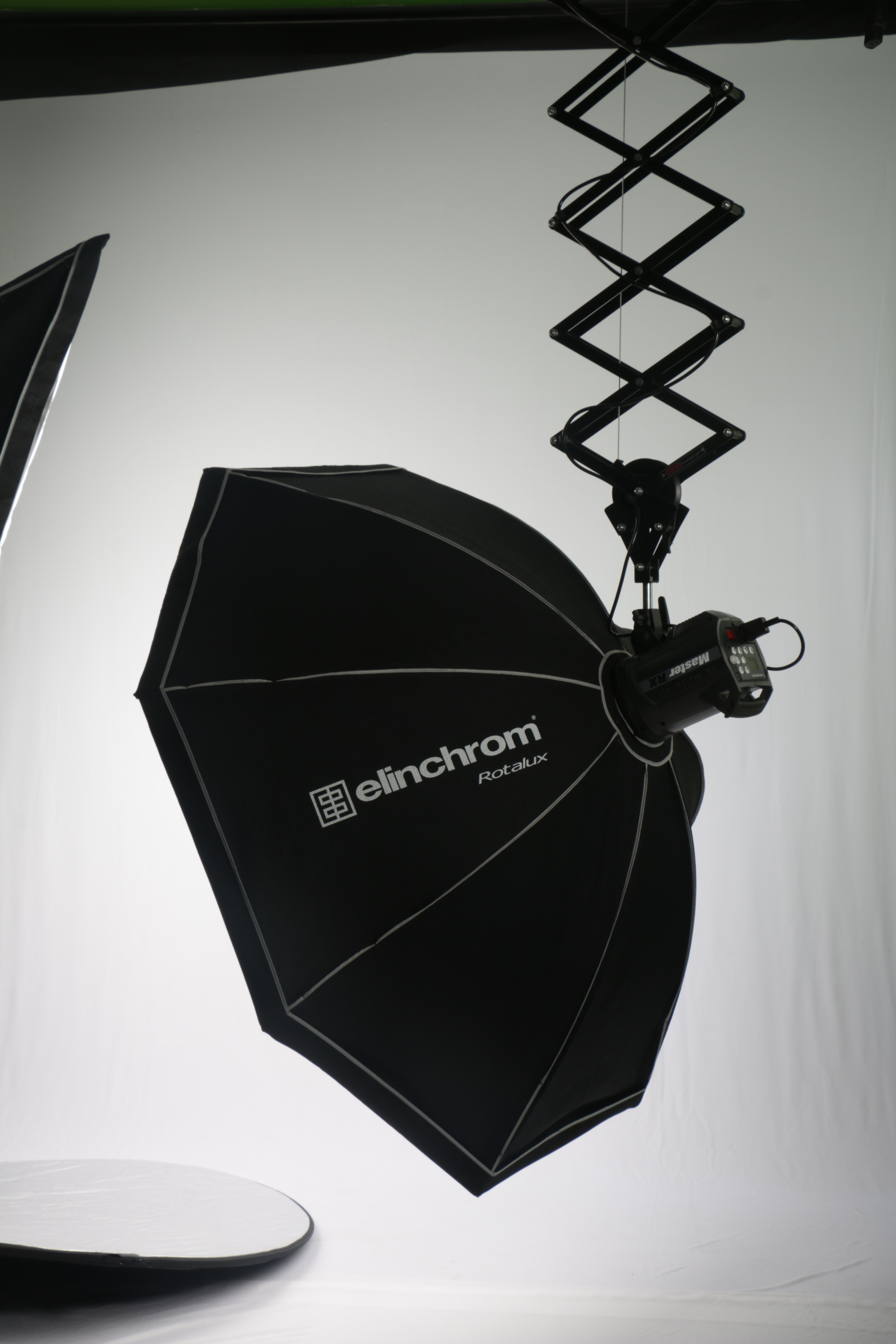
A pantograph with a studio light

A pantograph is a commonly used overhead suspension system for lamps and audio and video monitors in television studios. It is also used on a smaller scale in many photography studios. Using either motor driven cables or a spring system, the pantograph can be balanced so that a light touch can readjust the height of the load (usually a lamp). The system usually works through a series of connected diagonals that can be compressed or extended to adjust the height of the rig.
