= Finery London =

British fashion label

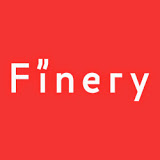
- Type: Limited
- Industry: Clothing retail
- Founded: February 2015
- Headquarters: London, England
- Products: Clothes, shoes, accessories
- Website: www.finerylondon.com

Finery London is a British womenswear fashion label.

== Background ==
The company's approach is offering smaller collections for women, that are “moderately priced”, styled, and versatile. Finery London is also stocked in third-party retailers including Marks & Spencer, John Lewis, Next, Tu Clothing and QVC.

== History ==
The company was founded in March 2014 by Nickyl Raithatha, Luca Marini and Caren Downie. Raithatha and Marini, who knew each other from business school, had the idea for a clothing brand while Raithatha was working for Rocket Internet and Marini was a director at one of Rocket's fashion e-tailers. They recruited Caren Downie, who had formerly been ASOS.com's fashion director and Topshop's buying director. Downie, in turn, recruited her former colleagues Emma Farrow and Rachel Morgans for design.

After obtaining initial funding from Rocket, Finery London launched in February 2015 with a 150-piece collection, priced between £19 for a jersey top and £345 for a leather jacket. To celebrate the launch of the website, in February 2015 Finery London opened a pop-up store in Covent Garden.

In 2017, Touker Suleyman (of Dragons’ Den) became a shareholder, and then in 2020, took over as CEO.
