= MLK (song) =

1984 song by U2

Song by U2

from the album The Unforgettable Fire
- Released: 1 October 1984
- Genre: Ambient
- Length: 2:32
- Label: Island
- Composer: U2
- Lyricist: Bono
- Producers: Brian Eno; Daniel Lanois

"MLK" is a song by Irish rock band U2, and is the tenth and final track on their 1984 album, The Unforgettable Fire. An elegy to Martin Luther King Jr., it is a short, pensive piece with simple lyrics (“Sleep/Sleep tonight/And may your dreams/Be realized/If the thundercloud/Passes rain/So let it rain/Rain down on he”). It was because of this song and "Pride (In the Name of Love)", another tribute to King, that lead vocalist Bono received the highest honor of the King Center for Nonviolent Social Change, an organization founded by Coretta Scott King.

== Writing and recording ==
"MLK" originated from a melody and set of lyrics composed by lead vocalist Bono while listening to the pitched hum of his vacuum cleaner. According to guitarist the Edge, the band "failed miserably" to find a musical arrangement that suited the melody and that the results "always sounded far too traditional". When the group decided to revisit the song, they started with just the vocal melody and a drone note to see which musical direction it would take them. The resulting arrangement sounded complete to them, convincing them not to refine it any further.

== Live performances ==
Its live debut was on 18 October 1984, as an intro to "The Unforgettable Fire", and the two songs were performed together at almost all Unforgettable Fire Tour shows and most Joshua Tree Tour shows. However, by the end of the Joshua Tree Tour, the band started to use "MLK" to precede other songs, especially "One Tree Hill", and it continued in this capacity on the Lovetown Tour. It failed to appear on the Zoo TV Tour but returned to the set list on the PopMart Tour, especially after the deaths of Diana, Princess of Wales and Michael Hutchence. It went into another hiatus after PopMart, missing the entire Elevation Tour, but was notably performed as the intro to "Where the Streets Have No Name" at U2's appearance during the Super Bowl XXXVI halftime show in 2002. After the death of Rosa Parks, it made five Vertigo Tour appearances; in all five instances, it was sung after "One" to conclude the main set. "MLK" was a part of the main set list for the U2 360° Tour, as the prelude to "Walk On". The song was dropped midway through the tour and was replaced with "Scarlet". It was not played live again until The Joshua Tree Tours 2017 and 2019, during which it was played on opening night before being replaced by "Bad" the following night.

== In popular culture ==
"MLK" was director Richard Kelly's original choice for the soundtrack to the final sequence of the 2001 film Donnie Darko. After difficulties licensing the song, it was decided to use Gary Jules' rendition of the Tears for Fears song "Mad World" instead.

In Stephen Chbosky's 1999 novel The Perks of Being a Wallflower, "MLK" is mentioned as one of Charlie's favorite songs, along with "Blackbird".

== Arrangements ==
Bob Chilcott has arranged the song for SATTBB choir, and this has been recorded by groups including The King's Singers. English musician Cosmo Sheldrake performed an eight minute live-looped, improvised version of the song in 2018.

== See also ==
- Civil rights movement in popular culture
