= Wide Awake in America =

EP by U2
- Released: 01 May 1985
- Recorded: 1984–1985
- Genre: Pop rock
- Length: 20:40
- Label: Island
- Producers: U2; Tony Visconti; Brian Eno; Daniel Lanois

U2 chronology
The Unforgettable Fire (1984)	Wide Awake in America (1985)	The Joshua Tree (1987)

Professional ratings
Review scores
Source	Rating
AllMusic	2/5 stars
Robert Christgau	B
Rolling Stone	mixed
The Rolling Stone Album Guide	3/5 stars

Wide Awake in America is a four-track extended play by Irish rock band U2. It was released on 20 May 1985 through Island Records. It combines two live performances of songs from the group's 1984 album The Unforgettable Fire with two B-sides from the era, which had previously been available only in the United Kingdom. Wide Awake in America was originally released only in North America and Japan but it charted in the UK as an import. It was re-released internationally in 1990.

The EP's centerpiece, "Bad", a song about heroin addiction, would become a staple of their live set, particularly after an extended performance at Live Aid in which lead vocalist Bono danced with a woman in the audience. Radio programmers often chose this Wide Awake in America version over the original studio recording for airplay. The EP's title is inspired by the chorus of "Bad", with its refrain, "Wide awake / I'm wide awake / I'm not sleeping."

== Song notes ==
"Bad" was produced by the band and recorded live from the National Exhibition Centre in Birmingham, England on 12 November 1984, as part of the Unforgettable Fire Tour. Guitarist the Edge misplayed the final note of this song, but U2 decided to use this version anyway, and the error was fixed during mixing. Rolling Stone magazine had been critical of the album version of "Bad" and other songs on The Unforgettable Fire album, which it described as "unfocused". In its review of Wide Awake In America, it said that the album's songs benefited from the transition to live performance and that "Bad" was a "show stopper."

"A Sort of Homecoming" is live from Wembley Arena in London on 15 November 1984. The song was produced by Tony Visconti and recorded during a soundcheck at the concert, with the crowd noise mixed in later during post-production at Good Earth Studios.

"The Three Sunrises" (also listed as "Three Sunrises") was produced by the band with Brian Eno and Daniel Lanois. It can also be found on the B-sides disc of the limited-edition version of The Best of 1980–1990 compilation from 1998.

"Love Comes Tumbling" was produced by the band and also appears, as a slightly edited version with four bars immediately preceding the vocal deleted, on the B-sides disc of The Best of 1980–1990.

All tracks except "Bad" originally appeared on "The Unforgettable Fire" single, released in April 1985 outside the U.S. The mix on "A Sort of Homecoming" from that single is different on this release and includes some studio-dubbed backing vocals by the Edge.

The EP was released in the United Kingdom on 19 October 1987.

== Track listing ==
All tracks are written by U2.

Side one
No.	Title	Producer	Length
1.	"Bad" (live)	U2	8:00
2.	"A Sort of Homecoming" (live)	Tony Visconti	4:05

Side two
No.	Title	Producer	Length
1.	"The Three Sunrises"	U2; Brian Eno; Daniel Lanois	3:50
2.	"Love Comes Tumbling"	U2	4:45

== Charts and certifications ==
In the U.S., Wide Awake in America debuted at No. 37 on the Top Pop Albums chart. However, the following week, Billboard declared the EP ineligible for the album chart because it contained only four songs and had a retail price of US$4.98. Billboard policy stated that to appear on the album chart, "a disk must list for at least $5.98 and contain more than four cuts, or the equivalent in terms of minutes of music."

Album

Country	Peak position	Certification	Sales
Canada		Platinum	100,000+
United Kingdom	11	Silver	
United States	37	Platinum	

Songs

Year	Song	Peak
Year	Song	US Main Rock
1985	"The Three Sunrises"	16

== Personnel ==
U2

- Bono – vocals
- The Edge – guitar, keyboards, vocals
- Adam Clayton – bass
- Larry Mullen Jr. – drums

Technical personnel

- U2 – production (all except "A Sort of Homecoming"), mixing on "The Three Sunrises"
- Tony Visconti – production on "A Sort of Homecoming"
- Brian Eno – production on "The Three Sunrises"
- Daniel Lanois – production on "The Three Sunrises"
- Ron St. Germain – mixing on "Bad"
- Kevin Killen – engineering on "Bad" and "A Sort of Homecoming"
- Kevin Moloney – mixing on "The Three Sunrises", engineering on "Love Comes Tumbling"
- Paul Thomas – engineering on "Love Comes Tumbling"
- Matt Mahurin – photographs, design

== See also ==
- U2 discography
