= Pride (In the Name of Love) =

1984 single by U2

Single by U2

from the album The Unforgettable Fire
- B-side: "Boomerang II"
- Released: 3 September 1984
- Recorded: May–August 1984
- Studio: Slane Castle (County Meath); Windmill Lane (Dublin)
- Genre: Rock; post-punk
- Length: 3:48 (standard version); 4:40 (original 12" UK single)
- Label: CBS Ireland; Island
- Composer: U2
- Lyricist: Bono
- Producers: Brian Eno; Daniel Lanois

U2 singles chronology
"40" (1983)	"Pride (In the Name of Love)" (1984)	"The Unforgettable Fire" (1985)

Audio sample
- file; help

Music video
- Sepia Version on YouTube; Color Version on YouTube; Slane Castle Version on YouTube

"Pride (In the Name of Love)" is a song by Irish rock band U2. It is the second track on the band's 1984 album, The Unforgettable Fire, and was released as its lead single in September 1984. The song was produced by Brian Eno and Daniel Lanois. Written about the civil rights leader Martin Luther King Jr., "Pride" received mixed critical reviews at the time, but it was a major commercial success for U2 and has since become one of their most popular songs, as well as being re-evaluated positively by many as one of the greatest popular rock songs of all time. It appeared on the band's compilation albums The Best of 1980–1990 and U218 Singles and was reworked and re-recorded for Songs of Surrender (2023).

In 2004, Rolling Stone ranked it 378th on its list of "The 500 Greatest Songs of All Time". The song was included on The Rock and Roll Hall of Fame's 500 Songs that Shaped Rock and Roll list.

== Writing and recording ==
The melody and the chords for "Pride" were improvised by U2 during a soundcheck prior to a November 1983 concert in Japan on the band's War Tour. Guitarist the Edge led the group with a series of chord changes during the soundcheck, but after someone made a mistake, the other members picked up on it and changed course, providing a "new twist" to the improvisation, according to Niall Stokes. After the tour concluded, the group continued to work on the track at lead vocalist Bono's home in a Martello tower in Bray, County Wicklow, where the Edge devised a guitar part for the song. "Pride" was further worked on at Slane Castle during the recording sessions for The Unforgettable Fire, but was subsequently re-recorded in its final version at Windmill Lane Studios (it was the only song to be re-cut).

The song had been intended to be based on Ronald Reagan's pride in the U.S.'s military power, but Stephen B. Oates's book Let The Trumpet Sound: A Life of Martin Luther King, Jr. and a biography of Malcolm X caused Bono to ponder the different sides of the civil rights campaigns, the violent and the non-violent. In subsequent years, Bono has expressed his dissatisfaction with the lyrics, which he describes, along with another Unforgettable Fire song, "Bad", as being "left as simple sketches". He says that he was swayed by the Edge and producers Brian Eno and Daniel Lanois, who played down the need to develop the lyrics as they thought their impressionistic nature would give added forcefulness to the song's feeling, particularly when heard by non-English speakers. During recording sessions, Eno encouraged the singer to use nonsense words "as place holders for the yet-to-be-written lyrics." In U2 by U2, Bono said: "I looked at how glorious that song was and thought: 'What the fuck is that all about?' It's just a load of vowel sounds ganging up on a great man. It is emotionally very articulate - if you didn't speak English."

The song contains the erroneous reference to King's shooting as "Early morning, April 4," when it actually occurred after 6 p.m. Bono acknowledges the error and in live performances he often changes the lyric to "Early evening..." The error was corrected on the acoustic version of the song included on the group's 2023 album Songs of Surrender; the updated lyric is "In the evening, April 4".

== Composition ==
"Pride" is in the key of B, and is played at a tempo of 106 bpm. The song follows a chord progression of B-E–A–F♯m and the solo is B–D–E–E.

== Music videos ==
Three music videos were made. The first was shot in August by director Donald Cammell and features opening and closing shots of the Dublin Docklands area. Two versions of this video exist; black and white and colour (sepia). The band were not satisfied with Cammell's video, and they agreed to their principal photographer, Anton Corbijn, shooting an alternative. The second video was filmed in a hotel basement near London's Heathrow Airport, which features U2 standing sternly in front of a wall under poor lighting conditions. The U2 camp was also unimpressed with this video and a third video is produced by compiling footage shot during The Unforgettable Fire recording sessions at Slane Castle. The original (black and white) Cammell video was primarily used in promotion.

== Reception ==
"Pride" reached number 3 on the UK Singles Chart. The song was the band's first top 40 hit in the United States where it peaked at number 33. It gained considerable US album-oriented rock radio airplay and its video was on heavy rotation on MTV, thus helping U2 continue its commercial breakthrough begun with the War album. It reached number 1 in New Zealand, the first time a U2 single topped a country's singles chart.

Initial critical reactions to "Pride" were mixed, especially in regards to the lyrics. Robert Christgau in The Village Voice complained of "the moralism with the turn-somebody-else's-cheek glorification of Martin Luther King's martyrdom." Meanwhile, Kurt Loder of Rolling Stone wrote that "'Pride' gets over only on the strength of its resounding beat and big, droning bass line, not on the nobility of its lyrics, which are unremarkable." Cash Box called it a "rousing anthem" with "powerful vocal and guitar," saying that "Bono’s writing and vocal delivery are pure inspiration as is the pounding rhythm section." The 1984 Pazz & Jop poll of 240 music critics ranked "Pride" as the 12th-best single of that year, a higher ranking than the overall album, which finished 29th. The single's ranking remained the highest of any U2 single until "One" achieved 8th in 1992.

== Live performances ==
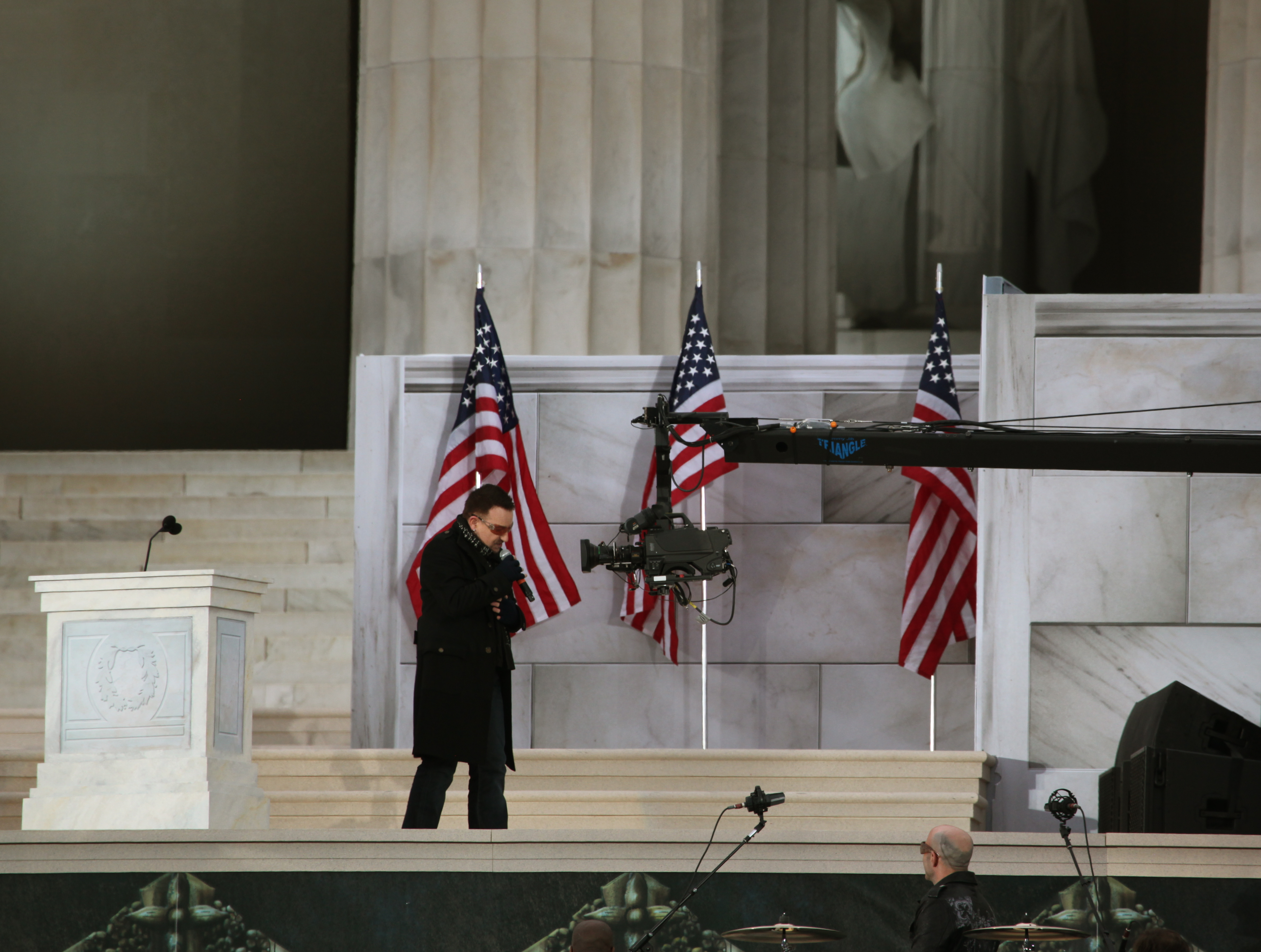
Bono during the performance of "Pride" at the 2009 We Are One concert

"Pride" was first played live at the opening show of the Unforgettable Fire Tour on 29 August 1984 in Christchurch, New Zealand. The song has been played at virtually every U2 concert since the Unforgettable Fire Tour, although it was played infrequently on the first and second legs of 2001's Elevation Tour and the second and third legs 2009's U2 360° Tour. Live performances during the 1980s and early 1990s were usually played in the key of B♭, while since the late 1990s the song has been played in the key of A. As of 2009, it is the band's most played song with over 770 documented performances, though "I Will Follow" has likely been performed more often. Clips from Martin Luther King speeches are often shown on the various tour video screens during these performances. In 2010, in Brisbane, Australia, the final verse was changed to reflect the 30th anniversary of the assassination of John Lennon (8 December 2010).

U2 performed the song, along with "City of Blinding Lights", to upwards of 400,000 people on 18 January 2009 at the We Are One concert at the Lincoln Memorial to celebrate the upcoming inauguration of Barack Obama. At the end of the performance, Bono asked the audience to sing for King's dream, saying it was "not just an American dream; also an Irish dream, a European dream, an African dream", before referencing it to the Israeli–Palestinian conflict and saying that it was "an Israeli dream, and also a Palestinian dream." The performance of "Pride" closed off with Bono quoting part of King's speech "I Have a Dream," saying "Let freedom ring! Let freedom ring! Let freedom ring! Every village, every hamlet, every state, every city. Let freedom ring!" before segueing into "City of Blinding Lights." Bassist Adam Clayton later said "We were scratching our heads going, 'How does an Irish band get invited to play at the Presidential Inauguration?' Our way in was through a song like 'Pride'. It allowed Obama's people to express the connection without being too overt. It was one of those moments where you know the world is watching, but a healthy amount of anxiety gets your mojo working."

During a live concert in Las Vegas on 9 October 2023, Bono dedicated a rendition of the song to the hundreds of young Israelis who lost their lives in a massacre orchestrated by Hamas terrorists at the Nova Sukkot music festival two days prior. The song's bridge was modified to address the event, with the lines 'Early morning, October 7 / The sun rises in the desert sky / Stars of David, they took your life / But they could not take your pride.'

Live performances of "Pride" appear on the concert films Rattle and Hum (both the album and motion picture), Zoo TV: Live from Sydney, PopMart: Live from Mexico City, U2 Go Home: Live from Slane Castle, Vertigo 2005: Live from Chicago, Live from Paris, U2 3D, Innocence + Experience: Live in Paris and Experience + Innocence: Live in Berlin.

== Legacy ==
In 1989, Spin named the song the 65th-greatest single in history. In 2004, Rolling Stone placed the song at number 378 on its list of "The 500 Greatest Songs of All Time"; the song was re-ranked to 388th on the magazine's 2010 version of the list. The Rock and Roll Hall of Fame selected "Pride (In the Name of Love)" as one of 500 Songs that Shaped Rock and Roll. Music television network VH1 ranked the song number 38 on the "100 Greatest Songs of the 80s" countdown in its series The Greatest. In 2004, Mojo placed the song at number 63 on its list of the "100 Epic Rock Tracks".

In 2007, the Roots covered "Pride" in a medley with "Sunday Bloody Sunday" for an NAACP dinner honoring Bono. The band also mixed in some of their own "False Media" and bits of Edwin Starr's "War".

The band would later choose the song to be one of forty songs that would be re-recorded for their 2023 effort Songs of Surrender. The new version of the song was the lead single off the album.

== Formats and track listings ==
7-inch release
No.	Title	Length
1.	"Pride (In the Name of Love)"	3:48
2.	"Boomerang II"	4:48

Double 7-inch release
No.	Title	Length
1.	"Pride (In the Name of Love)"	3:48
2.	"4th of July" (Long version)	2:38
3.	"Boomerang I" (Instrumental)	2:47
4.	"Boomerang II" (Vocal)	4:48

12-inch UK and Ireland release and CD re-release
No.	Title	Length
1.	"Pride (In the Name of Love)"	4:40
2.	"Boomerang I" (Instrumental)	2:47
3.	"Boomerang II"	4:48
4.	"4th of July" (Long version)	2:38

12-inch alternate release
No.	Title	Length
1.	"Pride (In the Name of Love)"	3:48
2.	"Boomerang I" (Instrumental)	2:47
3.	"Boomerang II"	4:48
4.	"11 O'Clock Tick Tock" (Long version)	4:13
5.	"Touch"	3:25

UK cassette release
No.	Title	Length
1.	"Pride (In the Name of Love)"	3:48
2.	"Boomerang I" (Instrumental)	2:47
3.	"Boomerang II"	4:48
4.	"11 O'Clock Tick Tock" (Long version)	4:13
5.	"A Celebration"	2:57

== Personnel ==
U2

- Bono – lead vocals
- The Edge – guitar, backing vocals
- Adam Clayton – bass guitar
- Larry Mullen Jr. – drums

Additional performers

- Chrissie Hynde (credited as "Christine Kerr") – backing vocals

== Charts ==
=== Weekly charts ===
Chart (1984)	Peak position
Australia (Kent Music Report)	4
Belgium (Ultratop 50 Flanders)	6
Canada RPM Top 100	26
Germany (GfK)	27
Irish Singles Chart	2
Italy (Musica e dischi)	20
Netherlands (Dutch Top 40)	8
Dutch MegaCharts	5
New Zealand Singles Chart	1
Norwegian Singles Chart	7
Swedish Singles Chart	12
UK Singles Chart	3
US Billboard Hot 100	33
US Billboard Top Rock Tracks	2

=== Year-end charts ===
Chart (1984)	Position
Australia (Kent Music Report)	26
Belgium (Ultratop Flanders)	47
Netherlands (Dutch Top 40)	41
Netherlands (Single Top 100)	27

== Certifications ==
Region	Certification	Certified units/sales
Brazil (Pro-Música Brasil)	Platinum	60,000^{‡}
Italy (FIMI) Sales since 2009	Gold	35,000^{‡}
New Zealand (RMNZ)	Platinum	30,000^{‡}
Spain (Promusicae)	Gold	30,000^{‡}
United Kingdom (BPI) Sales since 2004	Gold	400,000^{‡}
^{‡} Sales+streaming figures based on certification alone.

== See also ==
- List of covers of U2 songs - Pride (In the Name of Love)
- Civil rights movement in popular culture
