= Elvis Presley and America =

Song by U2

from the album The Unforgettable Fire
- Released: 1 October 1984
- Genre: Art rock, ambient
- Length: 6:22
- Label: Island
- Composer: U2
- Lyricist: Bono
- Producers: Brian Eno; Daniel Lanois

"Elvis Presley and America" is a song by Irish rock band U2, and is the ninth track on their 1984 album, The Unforgettable Fire.

This song was almost entirely a spur of the moment creation. Musically, it takes its instrumentation from a slowed down backing track of "A Sort of Homecoming". Producer Daniel Lanois said that he became frustrated while mixing that song and consequently slowed down the tape recording from 30 inches per second to 22. The vocals are the result of lead singer Bono improvising the lyrics while listening to the music for the first time. Bono viewed the vocal as a rough sketch, intending to write proper lyrics and rearrange the vocal at a later point. However, Lanois, Brian Eno and later everyone else felt that they'd captured a unique quality in the vocal performance that would be hard to recapture, so they kept it.

Bono described this track as a reaction to an Albert Goldman biography of Elvis Presley which was not flattering to the late singer. This would not be the last time Bono disagreed with Goldman's portrayal of a rock legend. The singer would later call out Goldman by name in "God Part II" (1988), this time in reference to an unflattering biography that Goldman wrote about John Lennon.

== Composition ==
"Elvis Presley and America" is in the key of E♭. The song has a tempo of 92 BPM.
