= Noel Kelehan =

Irish musician (1935–2012)

Noel Kelehan (26 December 1935 – 6 February 2012) was an Irish musician, conductor of the RTÉ Concert Orchestra and musical director of Radio Telefís Éireann. He retired as conductor in 1998.

== Life and career ==
As well as being an accomplished jazz pianist, he was most famous for being the conductor of many Irish entries to the Eurovision Song Contest, beginning in 1966 and ending in 1998. He conducted five winning Irish entries, in 1980, 1987, 1992, 1993, and 1996. In 1994, the winning song was performed without orchestral accompaniment. However, an entry rated second that year, "To nie ja!" performed by Edyta Górniak from Poland, was also conducted by Kelehan. He also conducted the entry from Bosnia and Herzegovina in 1993. In total, Kelehan conducted 29 Eurovision entries, 24 of them Irish. In 1999, after Kelehan retired, the use of an orchestra was discontinued at the Contest.

He died at the age of 76, in Dublin on 6 February 2012, after a long illness. His funeral took place in Dublin on 9 February 2012.

== Performance credits ==
Kelehan had several records to his credit; most notably, with the Noel Kelehan Quintet he recorded the album "Ozone" in 1979. In 1984 he wrote the string arrangements for songs The Unforgettable Fire and Bad from U2's album The Unforgettable Fire.

Preceded by (Netherlands) Rogier van Otterloo	Eurovision Song Contest conductor 1981	Succeeded by (United Kingdom) Ronnie Hazlehurst
Preceded by (Belgium) Jo Carlier	Eurovision Song Contest conductor 1988	Succeeded by (Switzerland) Benoit Kaufman
Preceded by (Sweden) Anders Berglund	Eurovision Song Contest conductor 1993-1995	Succeeded by (Norway) Frode Thingnæs
