= The Unforgettable Fire (song) =

1985 single by U2

- Standard edition

Single by U2

from the album The Unforgettable Fire
- B-side: "Love Comes Tumbling"; "Sixty Seconds in Kingdom Come"; "The Three Sunrises"; "Bass Trap"
- Released: 22 April 1985
- Recorded: May–August 1984
- Studio: Slane Castle (County Meath); Windmill Lane (Dublin)
- Length: 4:56
- Label: CBS Ireland; Island; Polystar
- Composer: U2
- Lyricist: Bono
- Producers: Brian Eno; Daniel Lanois

U2 singles chronology
"Pride (In the Name of Love)" (1984)	"The Unforgettable Fire" (1985)	"With or Without You" (1987)

Audio sample
- "The Unforgettable Fire": file; help

Music video
- "The Unforgettable Fire" on YouTube

"The Unforgettable Fire" is a song by Irish rock band U2. It is the title track of their fourth album (1984), and was released as the album's second single in April 1985. The band cited an art exhibition by victims of the atomic bombings of Hiroshima and Nagasaki that was held at The Peace Museum in Chicago as the lyrical inspiration for the song. It became U2's first number one single in Ireland, their third top-ten hit in the United Kingdom, reaching number six on the UK Singles Chart, and reached number eight on the Dutch singles chart.

The song, like many tracks from The Unforgettable Fire, is an atmospheric composition, with ambient use of guitar and a string arrangement by Irish jazz musician Noel Kelehan.

== Writing and recording ==
The song evolved from a short piano composition that guitarist the Edge had written during a demo session with Jimmy Destri from the band Blondie. The Edge said it was written for no particular purpose, but he envisioned it as a film soundtrack piece. However, he did not know how to "approach it lyrically or vocally", and as a result, spent a while toying with it. In late 1983, after completing their War Tour, U2 worked on material for their upcoming album The Unforgettable Fire at lead vocalist Bono's seaside home in a Martello tower in Bray, County Wicklow. While working with Bono, the Edge found a cassette recording of the piano piece and decided to revisit it. The two created a song arrangement with the Edge playing a Yamaha DX7 synthesiser, Bono playing bass guitar, and a drum machine filling in a beat. After adding new chords to the piece, they felt that it took on a "very tangible identity" that was very different from its original version. Within an hour, they had written a verse section of the song. The Edge said despite all the changes that would follow, "it was that first 20 minutes in Bono's house that counted." After bassist Adam Clayton and drummer Larry Mullen Jr. recorded a live rhythm section, the Edge said, "we knew we had something". At that point, the song did not have a guitar part, as the Edge was still playing on the DX7 and Bono was experimenting with two dozen different vocal melodies.

During the album's recording sessions, the band recorded a basic backing track initially consisting of drums, bass, and keyboards. At that stage, the vocal melody was still a work in progress and was "so intricate and complicated that it was almost ridiculous". After Bono recorded a guide vocal part, the group were able to start "throwing out some of the clutter" and simplify the vocal melody. The Edge struggled with composing a guitar part and in frustration decided to de-tune and re-tune his guitar strings until he found notes that he liked by ear. He subsequently played harmonics, creating an atmospheric sound that emphasised textures "without it having any structure whatsoever". Noel Kelehan of the RTÉ Concert Orchestra provided a string arrangement for the track. The album's producers Brian Eno and Daniel Lanois did what the Edge described as a "performance mix". After extensive work on the song, the group arrived at a recorded version of the song with which they were comfortable, even when "it seemed like [they] would have been better advised to be very harsh, and do some savage editing".

== Live performances ==
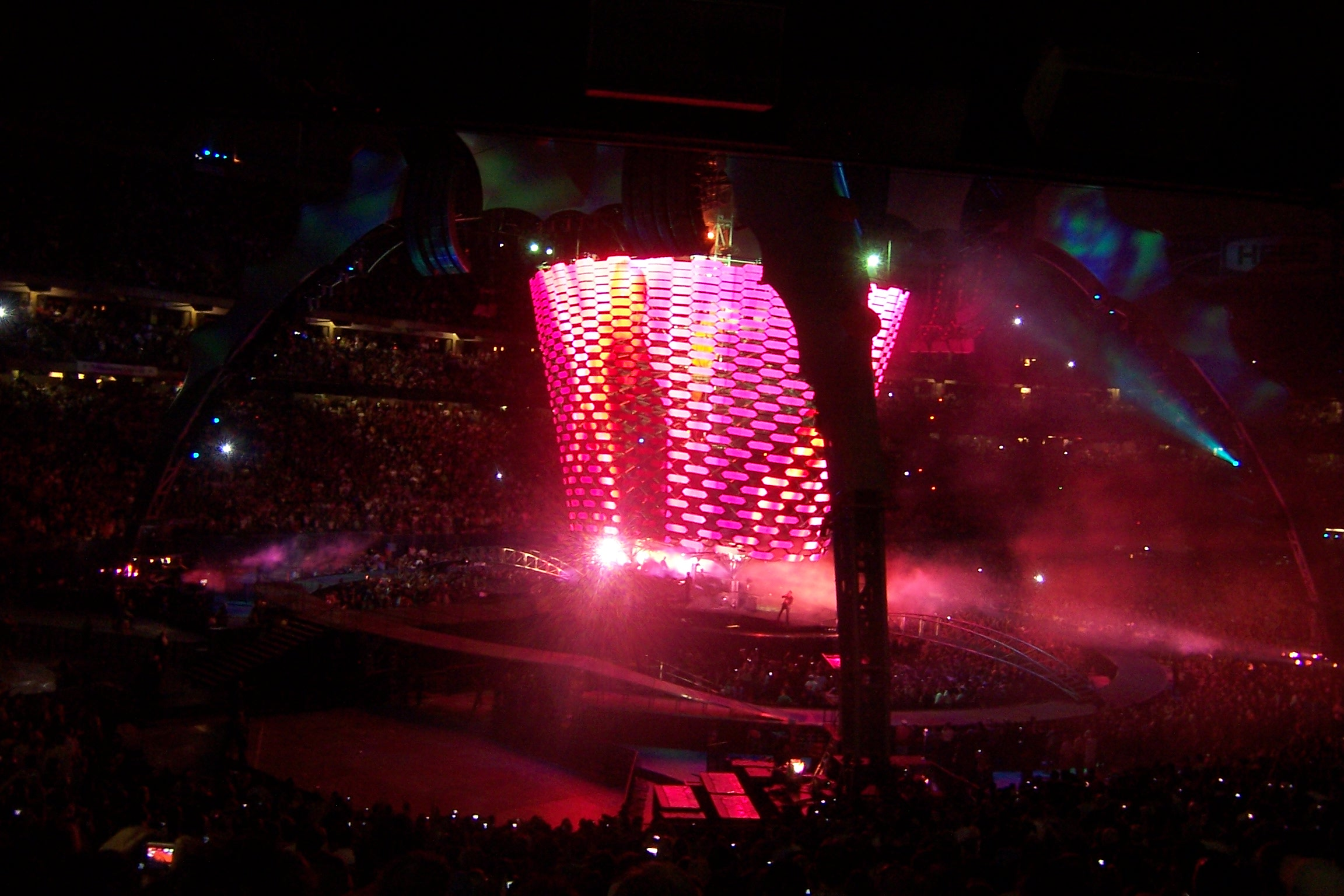
Lighting and video effects for the performance of "The Unforgettable Fire" on the U2 360° Tour

"The Unforgettable Fire" was first played live at the fourth show of the Unforgettable Fire Tour on 2 September 1984 in the New Zealand city of Auckland. It was subsequently played at almost all Unforgettable Fire Tour shows. It was played at the majority of The Joshua Tree Tour shows and appeared regularly during 1989's Lovetown Tour, with its last performance for nearly 20 years on 6 January 1990. The song returned to the group's concert repertoire on the opening night of the 2009 U2 360° Tour. The song was dropped during the European leg in 2010. It was not played again until the Experience + Innocence Tour, during which it was played once before being replaced by "Zoo Station" the following night.

== Formats and track listings ==
A shaped picture disc was issued with the IS220 release. The 12" Canadian release contained a false start at the beginning of "Love Comes Tumbling." "A Sort of Homecoming" and "Love Comes Tumbling" on the 12" Australian release were different versions from any other release.

7": Island / IS220 (UK release)
No.	Title	Length
1.	"The Unforgettable Fire"	4:56
2.	"A Sort of Homecoming" (Live at Wembley Arena, Wembley, London, England, 15 November 1984)	4:06

7": Island / K-9561 (Australian and New Zealand releases)
No.	Title	Length
1.	"The Unforgettable Fire"	4:56
2.	"MLK"	2:32

2x7": Island / ISD220 and CBS / DA 6185 (UK and Ireland releases)
No.	Title	Length
1.	"The Unforgettable Fire"	4:56
2.	"A Sort of Homecoming" (Live at Wembley Arena, Wembley, London, England, 15 November 1984)	4:06
3.	"Love Comes Tumbling"	4:45
4.	"Sixty Seconds in Kingdom Come"	3:15
5.	"The Three Sunrises"	3:52

12": Island / 12IS220, Island / 664 974, and Island / ISMC-1026 (UK, German CD, and Canadian releases)
No.	Title	Length
1.	"The Three Sunrises"	3:52
2.	"The Unforgettable Fire"	4:56
3.	"A Sort of Homecoming" (Live at Wembley Arena, Wembley, London, England, 15 November 1984)	4:06
4.	"Love Comes Tumbling"	4:45
5.	"Bass Trap"	5:17

12": Island / L18002 (Australian release)
No.	Title	Length
1.	"The Three Sunrises"	3:52
2.	"The Unforgettable Fire"	4:56
3.	"A Sort of Homecoming" (Live at Wembley Arena, Wembley, London, England, 15 November 1984)	4:06
4.	"Love Comes Tumbling" (Alternate version)	4:37
5.	"Bass Trap"	5:17

== Charts ==
=== Weekly charts ===
Chart (1985)	Peak position
Australia (Kent Music Report)	59
Belgium (Ultratop 50 Flanders)	11
Ireland (IRMA)	1
Netherlands (Dutch Top 40)	8
Netherlands (Single Top 100)	4
New Zealand (Recorded Music NZ)	3
UK Singles (Official Charts)	6

=== Year-end charts ===
Chart (1985)	Position
Netherlands (Dutch Top 40)	71
Netherlands (Single Top 100)	83

== See also ==
- List of covers of U2 songs - The Unforgettable Fire
