= The Unforgettable Fire =

1984 studio album by U2

Studio album by U2
- Released: 1 October 1984
- Recorded: 7 May – 5 August 1984
- Studios: Slane Castle (County Meath); Windmill Lane (Dublin)
- Genres: Art rock; post-punk
- Length: 42:38
- Label: Island
- Producers: Brian Eno; Daniel Lanois

U2 chronology
| U2 Live at Red Rocks: Under a Blood Red Sky (1984) | The Unforgettable Fire (1984) | Wide Awake in America (1985) |

Singles from The Unforgettable Fire
- 1. "Pride (In the Name of Love)" Released: 3 September 1984; 2. "The Unforgettable Fire" Released: 22 April 1985

The Unforgettable Fire is the fourth studio album by Irish rock band U2. It was produced by Brian Eno and Daniel Lanois, and released on 1 October 1984 by Island Records. The band wanted to pursue a new musical direction following the harder-hitting rock of their previous album, War (1983). As a result, they employed Eno and Lanois to produce and assist in their experimentation with a more ambient sound. The resulting change in direction was at the time the band's most dramatic. The album's title is a reference to "The Unforgettable Fire", an art exhibit about the atomic bombing of Hiroshima.

Recording began in May 1984 at Slane Castle, where the band lived, wrote, and recorded to find new inspiration. The album was completed in August 1984 at Windmill Lane Studios. It features atmospheric sounds and lyrics that lead vocalist Bono describes as "sketches". "Pride (In the Name of Love)" and "MLK" are lyrical tributes to Martin Luther King Jr.

The Unforgettable Fire received generally favourable reviews from critics and produced the band's biggest hit at the time, "Pride (In the Name of Love)", as well as the live favourite "Bad". A 25th anniversary edition of the album was released in October 2009.

== Background ==
"We knew the world was ready to receive the heirs to the Who. All we had to do was to keep doing what we were doing and we would become the biggest band since Led Zeppelin, without a doubt. But something just didn't feel right. We felt we had more dimension than just the next big anything, we had something unique to offer. The innovation was what would suffer if we went down the standard rock route. We were looking for another feeling."

— Bono, on The Unforgettable Fire's new direction.

U2 feared that following the overt rock of their 1983 album War and the War Tour, they were in danger of becoming another "shrill", "sloganeering arena-rock band". Following their concert at Dublin's Phoenix Park Racecourse in August 1983, one of the final dates of the War Tour, lead vocalist Bono spoke in metaphors about the group breaking up and reforming with a different direction. In the 10th issue of U2 Magazine, released in February 1984, Bono hinted at radical changes on the next album saying that he could not "sleep at night with the thought of it all" and that they were "undertaking a real departure". As bassist Adam Clayton recalls, "We were looking for something that was a bit more serious, more arty."

After completing the War Tour in Japan late that year, U2 rehearsed at Bono's seaside home in a Martello tower in Bray, County Wicklow. During this time, early versions of the songs "Pride (In the Name of Love)", "The Unforgettable Fire", and "A Sort of Homecoming" were composed.

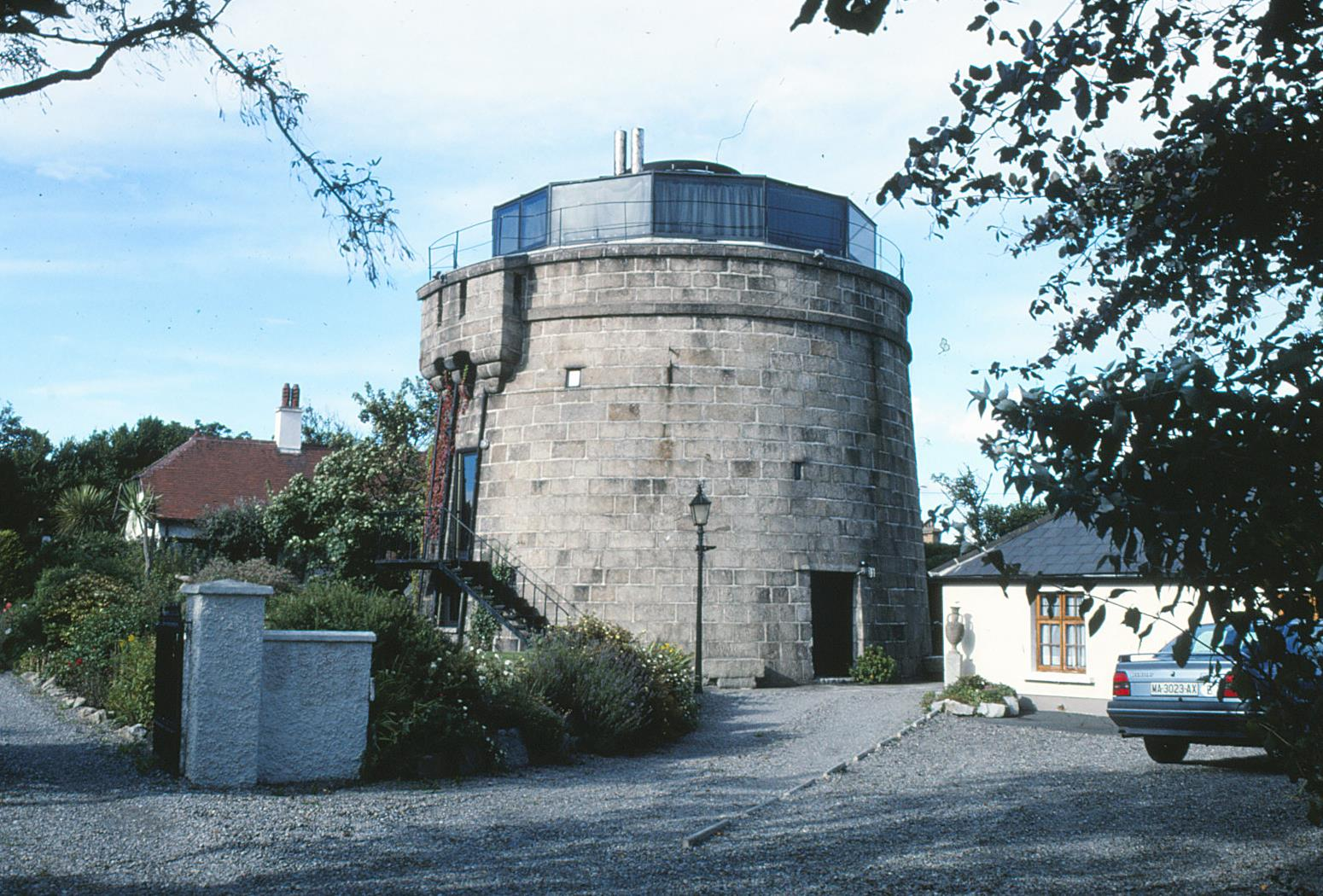
The group wrote initial material for the album at Bono's home in a Martello tower in late 1983.

U2 had recorded their first three albums at Windmill Lane Studios but decided to find a new location for their next studio album. Clayton lamented the lack of a live room in which the band could play together at Windmill Lane, while the band's manager Paul McGuinness said the studio had barely enough space for people to work. He set to finding a new location and came up with Church Hall in Ranelagh, but he found it overpriced. The band's tour manager Dennis Sheehan also searched for suitable locations and found Slane Castle in County Meath. The building's owner, Lord Henry Mountcharles, offered to lease it to the group for less than half the cost of Church Hall, and also offered lodging and dining for the band and crew on-premises. The castle's Gothic ballroom, which was originally built for music and had a 30-foot high domed ceiling, also attracted the band, as they were looking to capture the natural acoustics of a room in their recordings.

After working with producer Steve Lillywhite on their first three albums, the band sought experimentation rather than to create the "son of War". Both Lillywhite and the group agreed that it was time for a change of producers and that they should not "repeat the same formula". For their next studio album, the band considered hiring Conny Plank, whose previous production credits included Can, Kraftwerk, and Ultravox. U2 also met with Roxy Music producer Rhett Davies, but Clayton said that it "didn't really go anywhere". They also considered Jimmy Iovine, who had produced their live album Under a Blood Red Sky in 1983, but they found their early musical ideas for the new album to be too "European" for an American producer. Iovine thought that he was in line for the job and went so far as to hold a meeting about recording logistics at Slane Castle with his engineer Shelly Yakus and with another engineer Randy Ezratty, whose mobile recording studio U2 would be using once again. However, at the last minute, McGuinness informed Ezratty that they would be proceeding with different producers.

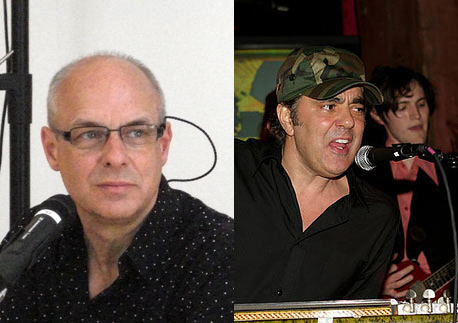
Seeking a new musical direction after their first three albums, U2 hired Brian Eno and Daniel Lanois to produce The Unforgettable Fire.

U2 instead had turned their attention to hiring musician/producer Brian Eno. Guitarist the Edge had long admired Eno's music, particularly his ambient and "weird works". The group were also fond of his collaborations with Talking Heads. Eno was hesitant to work with a rock band and when contacted by U2, he told them he was considering retiring from music production to become a video artist. Reluctantly, Eno agreed to meet with the band in Dublin and brought along his engineer Daniel Lanois with the intention of recommending he work with them instead; Lanois had his own ambitions of producing a rock band. When the band played Under a Blood Red Sky to Eno, his eyes "glazed over". The Edge said of him: "I think he was intimidated by the lack of irony in what we were doing. He'd come from Talking Heads, the Rhode Island School of Design, living in New York, and here was this Irish band hitting everything full on, completely earnest, hearts on sleeves, no irony at all." Eno also thought that the group were "frightened of being overpowered by some softness". His doubts were resolved by Bono's persuasiveness and his increasing perception of what he called "U2's lyrical soul in abundance". Eno was impressed by how they spoke, which was not in terms of music or playing, but in terms of their contributions to the "identity of the band as a whole". The band's discussion about pursuing different recording techniques and capturing the ambience of a recording space also piqued his interest. Ultimately, Eno and Lanois agreed to produce the record with the understanding that if Eno's working relationship with U2 was not fruitful, they would still have a solid producer in Lanois on which they could fall back.

Island Records founder Chris Blackwell initially tried to talk U2 out of hiring Eno, believing that just when they were about to achieve the highest levels of success, Eno would "bury them under a layer of avant-garde nonsense". Nick Stewart, also of Island Records, thought the band were "mad". Blackwell instructed him to dissuade U2 from working with Eno; Stewart recalled Blackwell telling him, "You better sort your band out because they're going in a very odd direction." Stewart was unable to change their minds, prompting Blackwell to fly to Dublin to meet with the group. Ultimately, Blackwell too was convinced by Bono's persuasiveness and the band's enthusiasm for the collaboration. Stewart said that in hindsight, the group's decision to stretch themselves and find an extra dimension became the "turning point in their career".

== Recording and production ==
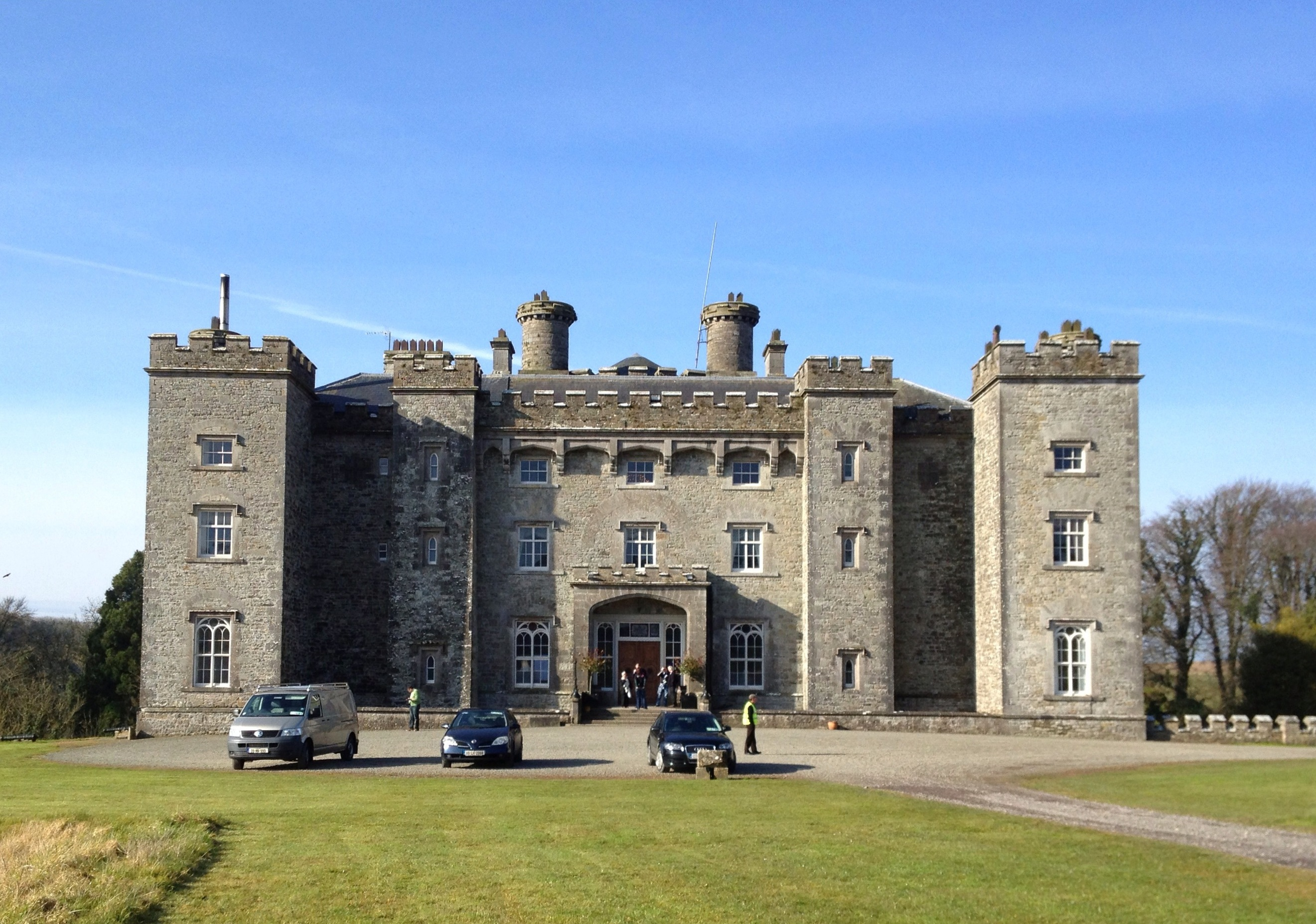
The first phase of recording took place in Slane Castle.

The band arrived at Slane Castle on 7 May 1984 for a month-long recording session. A makeshift control room was set up in the castle's drawing room. Ezratty's company Effanel Music, which recorded U2's concerts in Boston and at Red Rocks Amphitheatre the previous year, was hired to provide their then-unique portable 24-track recording system. The equipment, which came in wheeling flight cases with removable lids, was described by Lanois as a "heavily modified Sound Workshop mixing console with a Stevens [sic] tape recorder". He said it was not the "ultimate technical system" but that the priority was to capture the feeling of the band's music. Ezratty's equipment was set up in the castle's library, dubbed the Chinese Room, with cables running into the adjacent ballroom where the band played. The band and crew lived at the castle during the sessions, helping to foster a camaraderie among them. The site provided a relaxed and experimental atmosphere.

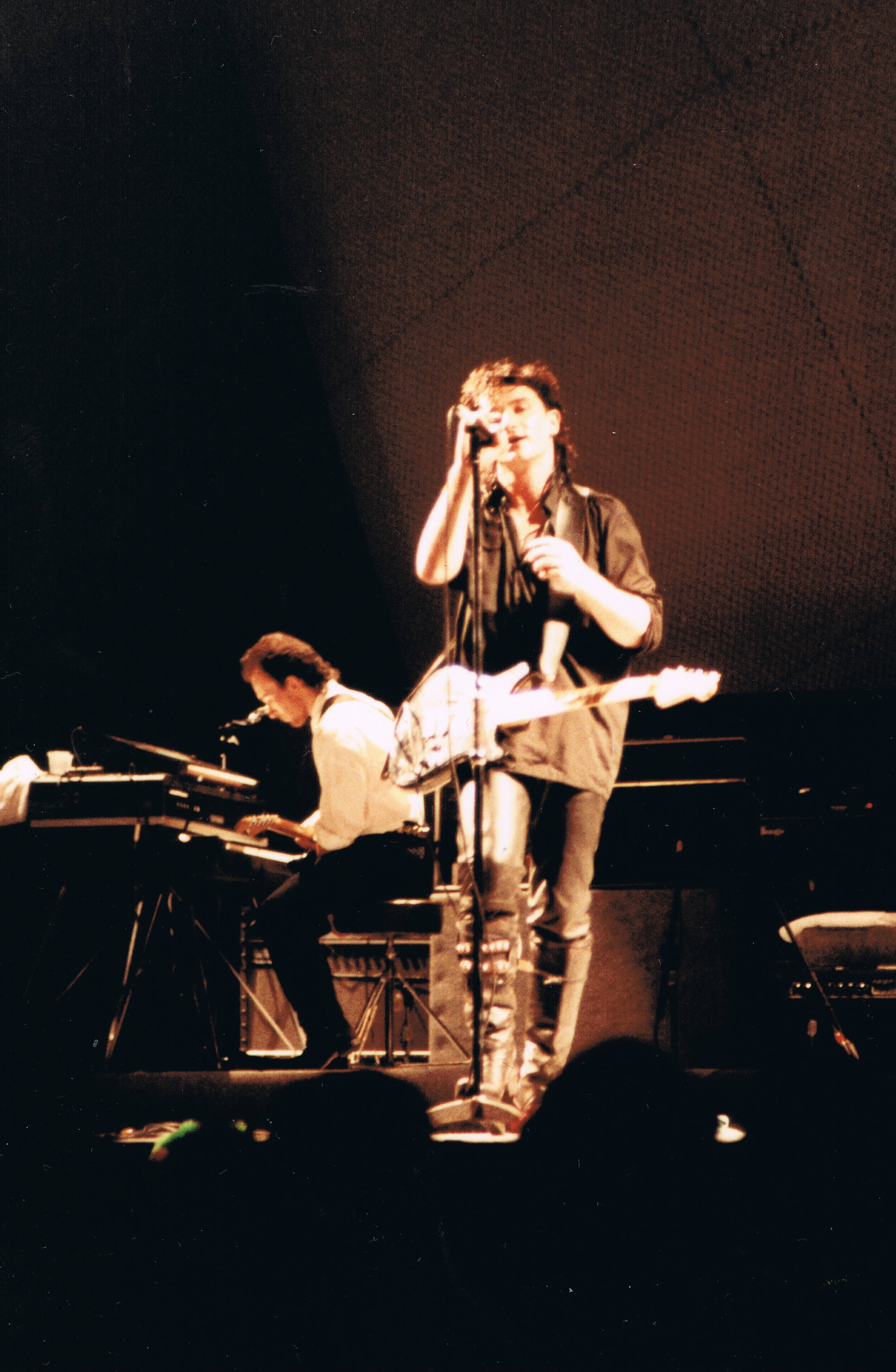
The Edge and Bono (pictured in 1984) were receptive to producer Brian Eno's experimental approach.

U2 worked long days at the castle, sometimes starting at 10 a.m. and finishing at 1 a.m. Eno, who worked on a more "executive schedule" than other members of the creative team, was focused on creative ideas and conceptual aspects, while Lanois handled the production duties. In Bill Graham's words, Eno's task was to "help [U2] mature a new, more experimental and European musical vocabulary". Eno was glad that the group began the sessions with only rough sketches of songs, as he was more interested in encouraging experimentation and improvisation than refining their ideas. To that end, he often created atmospheric compositions on a synthesiser that were intended to inspire U2 and Lanois to play along with. Bono and the Edge, who the singer described as the "more cerebral" members of the band, were particularly drawn to Eno's ideas. The band's experiments produced 15 additional pieces of music. The Edge said that they "didn't object to [Eno] taking liberties with what [they] had achieved up to that point", adding: "We were eager to learn and not precious at all about our sound or the way we worked. We threw ourselves wholeheartedly into this different approach." According to the Edge, Eno's points of reference were philosophy and contemporary art, and he was not beholden to the standard schools of thought in rock music. The producer encouraged U2 to work on their more unconventional material, "champion[ing] the songs that didn't seem very U2-ish or things that had strong beginnings but no clear destination". As a result, he did not take much interest in songs like "Pride (In the Name of Love)" or "The Unforgettable Fire". Lanois would "cover for him" such that the two balanced each other out.

Since U2 had primarily been interested in working with Eno, Lanois was initially viewed as an "interloper", which caused tension at the start of the sessions, according to Ezratty. Once the band realised his musical talents, they embraced him as a fellow collaborator. As a songwriter and multi-instrumentalist, Lanois understood musical notation and was able to simplify the songwriting process for them. Drummer Larry Mullen Jr. in particular enjoyed working with Lanois, as the producer took an interest in the band's rhythm section, which Mullen felt had been neglected on their past recordings. Mullen called himself "not technically proficient" and appreciated Lanois spending time to develop his skills and encourage different approaches to playing drums. The producer convinced Mullen to utilise timbales and two types of snare drums (one being a piccolo snare) in his drum kit, and he explained how to use brushes and tom-toms on various drum parts. The crew also experimented with distant miking of his drum kit, placing microphones up to 60 feet away. Mullen eschewed wearing headphones while playing and instead used monitor speakers, which caused audio spill issues with other microphones in the recording space.

"With Steve [Lillywhite], we were a lot more strict about a song and what it should be; if it did veer off to the left or the right, we would pull it back as opposed to chasing it. Brian [Eno] and Danny [Lanois] were definitely interested in watching where a song went and then chasing it."

— Adam Clayton, on how The Unforgettable Fire's producers approached the album

The Edge said that the band's plan for recording at Slane was rather than working in the "dead, acoustic atmosphere" of a studio and "trying to revitalise the recorded work using effects and reverberation and all the standard music trappings, we would go into a very live room and try to do the opposite—try and tame what would be a wild sound". To capture the feeling of the music as much as possible, they recorded the basic tracks as live takes with the whole band playing together; this differed from their previous albums, for which they overdubbed the instruments as separate tracks on top of a drum track, with as much separation as possible. The Edge felt that the "vibrancy" from playing their older songs live had "outshone what [they] had done on record", thus inspiring them to seek out a more live feel for The Unforgettable Fire.

Lanois originally intended for the band to record entirely in the ballroom, which he described as a "beautiful very tall room with big mirrors, chandeliers and windows overlooking the river". Shortly after their arrival, the team realised that the ballroom had too much natural reverberation, necessitating the addition of sound absorption materials such as drapes to the walls. Lanois said the room was only suitable for songs with "openness but not good for tracks that were quick and required punch", while crew member Stephen Rainford said, "Okay for chamber music, but no good for rock and roll". Consequently, most of the recording took place in the library, which was smaller, rectangular, filled with books, and provided improved sound quality. Lanois said the room helped them "achieve a denser more powerful sound" on their recordings. Adding to the recording challenges was the water wheel generator on River Boyne that powered the building. During low tide or periods of no rain, there was not sufficient power to keep their recording equipment operational. Ezratty said, "When that stupid river started to run low, the voltage would go down and it would beat the crap out of my equipment." As a backup, the team were forced to make use of an old diesel generator, which at times broke down or caught fire.

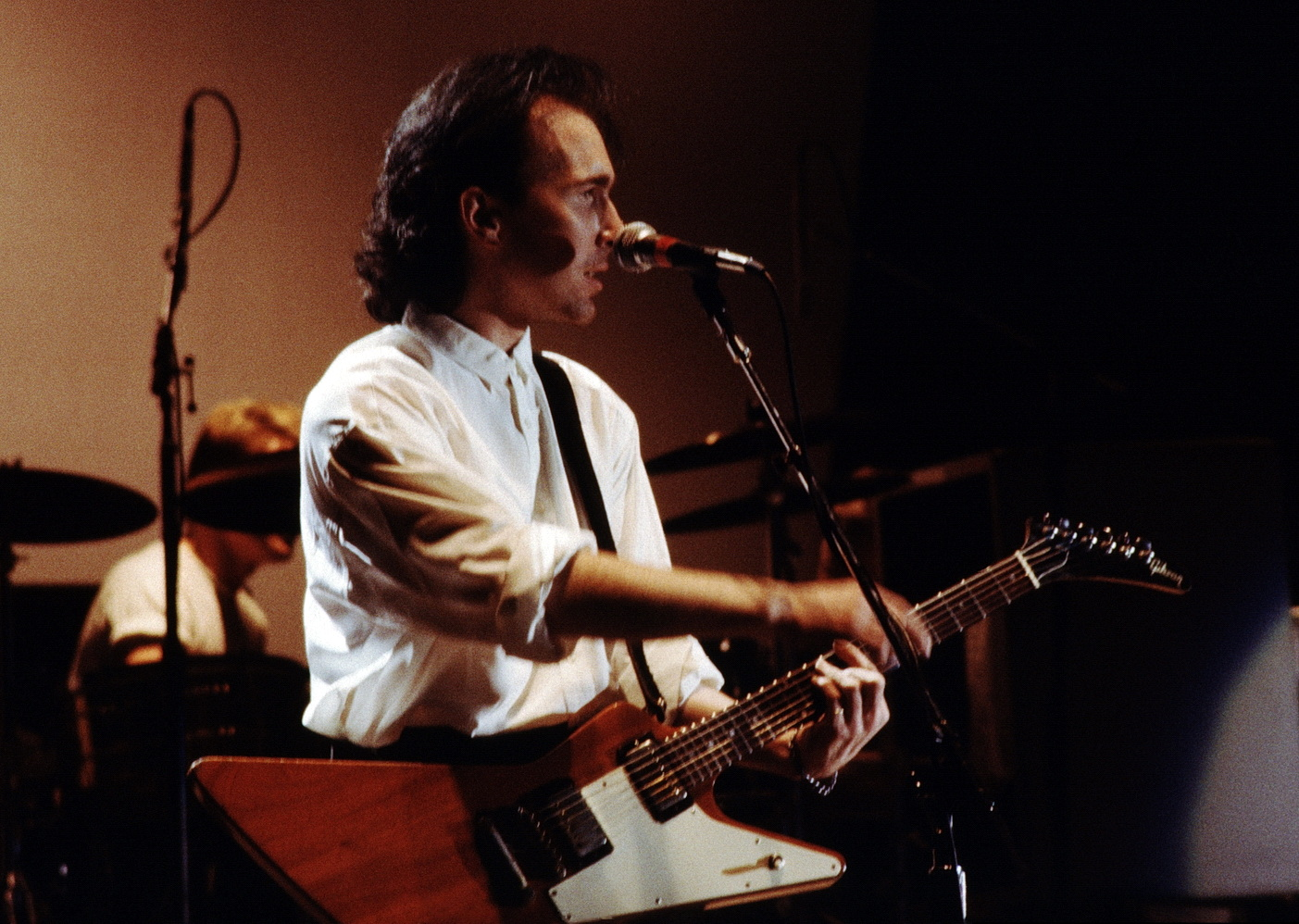
The Edge (pictured in 1985) experimented with his guitar style, equipment setup, and tunings during the recording sessions at Eno's encouragement.

The Edge was encouraged by Eno to think of the studio as an instrument and to expand the range of his guitar tones, resulting in experiments with his equipment and guitar playing techniques. The producer processed the Edge's guitar through an AMS harmonizer effects unit, a Lexicon Prime Time delay unit, and a reverb chamber; Lanois at times confused the guitar sounds for keyboards. The Edge also used an EBow, a slide with echo, alternative guitar tunings, and a "zero sustain" technique that muted his strings with tape across the bridge. He experimented with the placement and miking of his guitar amplifier. At times, it was situated outside on the balcony encircling the castle, with close miking and, when it rained, a plastic cover to shield it. This placement was originally done for sound isolation purposes, but ended up producing a good sound. Other times, his amplifier was placed at the bottom of a staircase, with one microphone there and another placed at the top of the staircase.

A Fairlight CMI synthesiser was used during the demoing phase out of convenience to help fill in placeholder textures and string ideas, marking the first time the instrument had been used on a U2 album. These textures were later replaced with actual string arrangements, although the Fairlight CMI was kept on one song. Clayton said the synthesiser "was only really used as a means to an end, to see if an idea worked". Eno contributed synthesiser parts on a Yamaha DX7, while he and the Edge also played a Yamaha CP-70 electric grand piano.

Bono recorded his vocals on Neumann U47 and U67 and AKG C-12 microphones. Lanois said that they captured a warm sound and a "bottom end and depth" to Bono's vocals. For "Promenade", one of the first songs for which vocals were recorded, Lanois encouraged Bono to sing quieter by increasing the volume of his vocals in his headphones. By doing so, the producer was able to force Bono to "draw on the fine points of the voice".

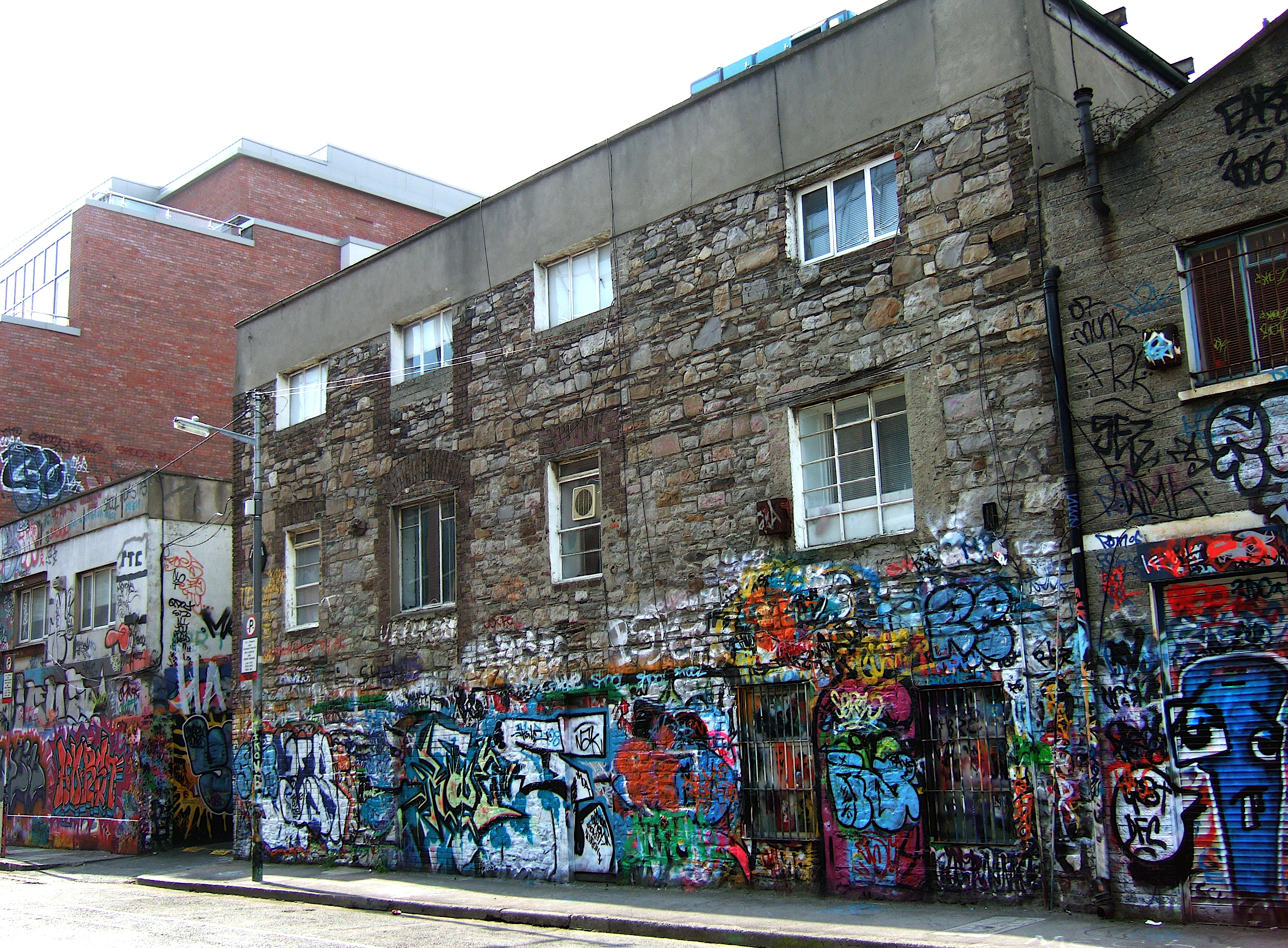
The second phase of recording took place at Windmill Lane Studios.

The band finished recording at Slane Castle on 5 June and began a second phase of the recording sessions at Windmill Lane Studios the following day. Their original intent was to record the backing tracks at Slane before overdubbing and mixing at Windmill Lane. Clayton said this was because the mobile recording equipment did not offer them as many options or treatment possibilities as a traditional studio mixing console would. However, the group ended up crafting their songs at Windmill Lane more than they originally anticipated, including re-recording "Pride (In the Name of Love)". The Edge reflected that when recording at a new location such as Slane, it took them a few weeks to "get in to the momentum of the new creative surrounding". Lanois said that in hindsight the recording sessions were "split in a slightly off-balanced fashion", with too much time being dedicated to experimenting and not enough to fundamental recording. Within the band, there were concerns that their material recorded at Slane was too skeletal to consider completing yet, prompting them to re-evaluate and in some cases re-record it. Eno, on the other hand, was more interested in recording as few takes as possible and preserving the rough, spontaneous nature of the music. Clayton said that Eno would get easily bored if he had nothing to do, while Mullen said he was impatient with U2's creative process. Tension grew between them and the production team, largely because the band "weren't at a point where [they] could finish anything".

Throughout the recording sessions, Bono had been ad-libbing his vocals, without completing lyrics. Mullen explained that the group's reliance on Bono to help complete the musical composition of their songs took time away from him to work on the lyrics independently: "While recording, we seemed to do our best work when we were in the room together. We depended on Bono to be there, every step of the way. He had to be singing something, anything, to get the song finished. When Bono came in and strapped on a guitar or started to sing, the band responded... A song recorded in the room with Bono and a song recorded without him could be very different animals altogether." Whereas Bono wanted to finalise the lyrics, Eno, Lanois, and the Edge advocated preserving the improvised nature of his vocals, telling the singer, "Why write lyrics?... I'm getting the feeling from this." In retrospect, Bono lamented leaving the lyrics to songs like "Bad" and "Pride (In the Name of Love)" as incomplete "sketches".

Twelve days before the deadline to complete the record, Bono told his bandmates he did not think he would be able to finish the lyrics in time, creating a panic internally. McGuinness reminded the group of their commitment to tour Australia and New Zealand in less than a month, and that the producers and studio would not be available afterwards. To complete the album, the band worked 20-hour days for the final two weeks; Eno worked the first half of days, while Lanois worked the second half. Eno departed before the album was completed, leaving Lanois to oversee the final mixes. On their final day in the studio, the band worked overnight to complete the album by 7–8 a.m. on 5 August. As Lanois was preparing to depart for London with the album tapes for mastering, Bono expressed interest in recording another take of his vocals for "A Sort of Homecoming". With his taxi to the airport waiting outside, Lanois cued up the tapes for Bono to record one final vocal take. Lanois told the band he would mix it in London and then departed, delivering the tapes for mastering in the basement of Blackwell's offices.

Portions of the recording sessions were filmed by Barry Devlin and his crew for an RTÉ-TV documentary. The 30-minute programme, The Making of The Unforgettable Fire, was released in 1985 on VHS as part of The Unforgettable Fire Collection. Devlin said that he did not think the band and crew had thought through the logistics and access required for a film crew to document the making of the album. He often encountered "No Entry" signs on doors and windows when attempting to film the group, forcing him to take a more artful, impressionistic approach to the documentary.

== Composition ==
A far more atmospheric album than the previous War, The Unforgettable Fire was at the time the band's most dramatic change in direction. It has a rich and orchestrated sound and was the first U2 album with a cohesive sound. Under Lanois's direction, Mullen's drumming became looser, funkier and more subtle, and Clayton's bass became more subliminal, such that the rhythm section no longer intruded, but flowed in support of the songs. Eno's atmospheric production, along with more experimental song structures, lent the album an "art-rock sensibility" and "atmospheric rock" style that departed from U2's "hard-hitting post-punk roots", according to Paste magazine's Luke Larson. Both Stereogum and Entertainment Weekly also observed art rock on the album, while The Austin Chronicle's Christopher Gray said "the rich textures, impressionistic tableaux, and cinematic landscapes" may not be "art rock per se", but still "served to distance U2 even further from their post-punk peers".

The opening track, "A Sort of Homecoming", immediately shows the change in U2's sound. Like much of the album, the hard-hitting martial drum sound of War was replaced with a subtler polyrhythmic shuffle, and the guitar was no longer as prominent in the mix. Typical of the album, the track "The Unforgettable Fire", with a string arrangement by Noel Kelehan, has a rich, symphonic sound built from ambient guitar and driving rhythm, along with a lyrical "sketch" that is an "emotional travelogue" with a "heartfelt sense of yearning". The band cited a travelling Japanese art exhibit of the same name as inspiration for both the song and album title. The exhibition, which the band attended in Chicago, commemorated the victims of the bombing of Hiroshima. However, the open-ended lyric, which Bono says "doesn't tell you anything", does not directly reference nuclear warfare. Rather, the lyrics are about travelling to Tokyo.

The album's lyrics are open to many interpretations, which alongside its atmospheric sounds, provides what the band often called a "very visual feel". Bono had recently been immersing himself in fiction, philosophy and poetry, and came to realise that his song writing mission—which up to that point had been a reluctant one on his behalf—was a poetic one. Bono felt songs like "Bad" and "Pride (In the Name of Love)" were best left as incomplete "sketches", and he said that "The Unforgettable Fire was a beautifully out-of-focus record, blurred like an impressionist painting, very unlike a billboard or an advertising slogan."

"The Unforgettable Fire" (1984)
The title track has a rich, symphonic sound built from ambient instrumentation, a driving rhythm, and a lyrical "sketch".

The melody and the chords to "Pride (In the Name of Love)" originally came out of a 1983 War Tour sound check in Hawaii. The song was originally intended to be about Ronald Reagan's pride in America's military power, but Bono was influenced by Stephen B. Oates's book about Martin Luther King Jr. titled Let The Trumpet Sound: A Life of Martin Luther King, Jr. and a biography of Malcolm X to ponder the different sides of the civil rights campaigns, the violent and the non-violent. Bono would revise the lyrics to pay tribute to King. "Pride" went through many changes and re-recordings, as captured in a documentary included on The Unforgettable Fire Collection video. "Pride" is the most conventional song on the album—Tony Fletcher of Jamming! magazine said at the time it was the most commercial song U2 had written—and it was chosen as the album's first single.

On "Wire" Bono tried to convey his ambivalence to drugs. It is a fast-paced song built on a light funk drum groove. The song shows the influence of Talking Heads, with whom Eno had worked. Much of the song was improvised by Bono at the microphone.

The ambient instrumental "4th of July" came about almost entirely through a moment of inspiration from Eno. At the end of a studio session, Eno overheard Clayton improvising a simple bass figure and recorded it "ad hoc" as it was being played. The Edge happened to join in, improvising a few guitar ideas over the top of Clayton's bass; neither knew they were being recorded. Eno added some treatments and then transferred the piece straight to two-track master tape—and that was the song finished, with no possibility of further overdubs.

Bono tried to describe the rush and then come down of heroin use in the song "Bad".

The sparse, dreamlike "MLK" was written as an elegy to King.

== Release and promotion ==
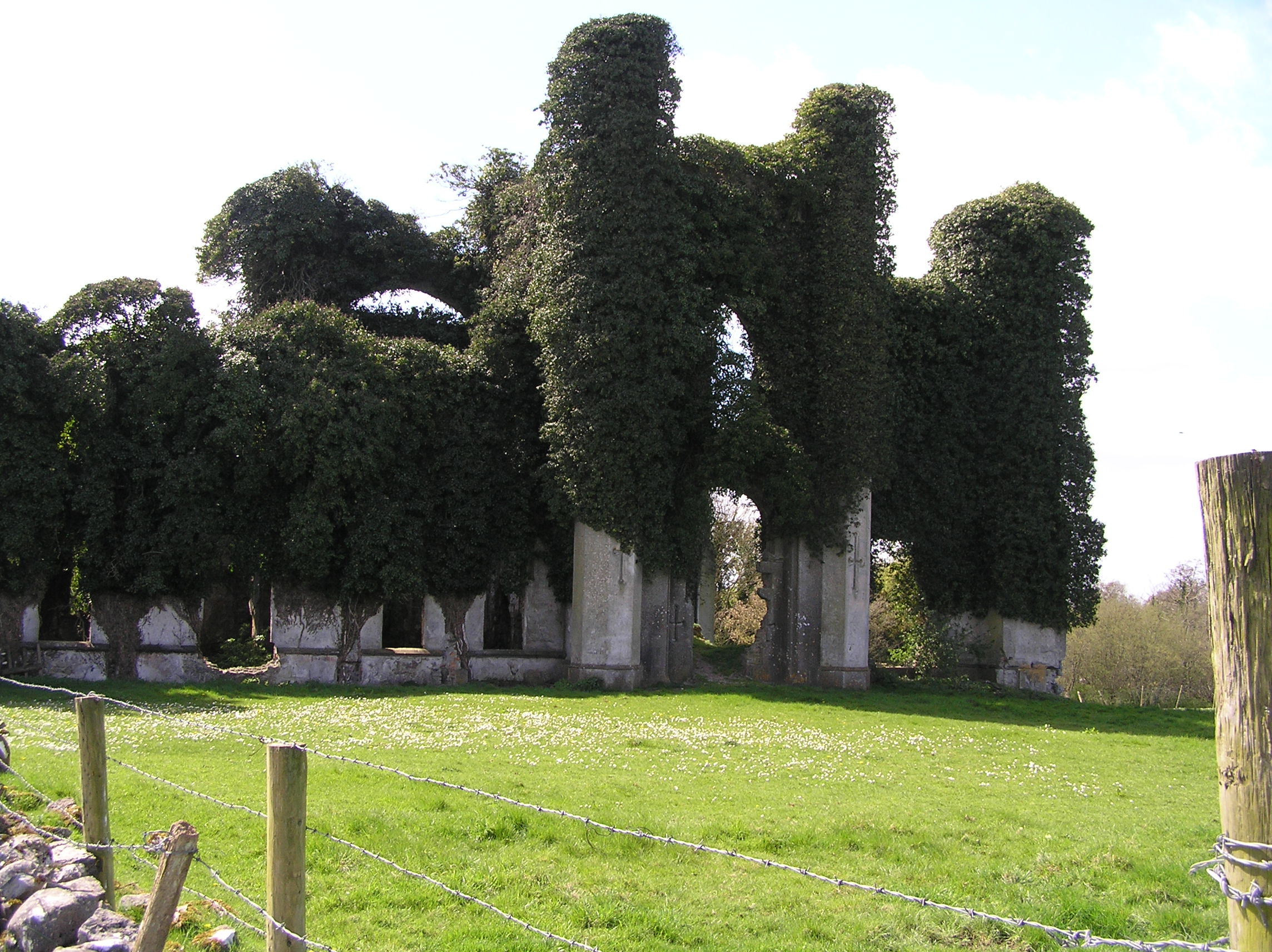
Moydrum Castle, the site depicted on the album cover

The Unforgettable Fire was released on 1 October 1984. The album took its name and much of its inspiration from a Japanese travelling exhibition of paintings and drawings at The Peace Museum in Chicago by survivors of the atomic bombs at Hiroshima and Nagasaki, Japan. The band spent a few days driving around Ireland with photographer Anton Corbijn looking for potential locations. The castle depicted on the cover is Moydrum Castle. The band liked the image's ambiguity and the Irish mysticism they saw in it. The photograph, however, was a virtual copy of a picture on the cover of a 1980 book In Ruins: The Once Great Houses of Ireland by Simon Marsden. It was taken from the same spot and used the same photographic techniques, but with the addition of the four band members. For this copyright infringement, the band had to pay an unknown sum to Marsden.

"Pride (In the Name of Love)" was released as the album's lead single in September 1984, and it was at that point the band's biggest hit. It cracked the UK Top 5 and the U.S. Top 40 and would ultimately become the group's most frequently played song in concerts.

"The Unforgettable Fire" was released as the second single in April 1985. The song became the band's third Top 10 hit in the UK, reaching number six on the UK Singles Chart and number 8 on the Dutch singles chart, but did not perform as well in the U.S.

== Critical reception ==
Professional ratings
Review scores
| Source | Rating |
|---|---|
| AllMusic | 4/5 stars |
| The Austin Chronicle | 4.5/5 stars |
| Chicago Tribune | 2.5/4 stars |
| Entertainment Weekly | B+ |
| Hot Press | 12/12 |
| Pitchfork | 9.3/10 |
| Q | 5/5 stars |
| Rolling Stone | 3/5 stars |
| The Rolling Stone Album Guide | 4.5/5 stars |
| The Village Voice | B+ |

Upon its release, reviews were generally favorable. Paul Du Noyer of NME praised the album and the new Eno–Lanois production team. The review said: "The old four-square rock unit has been deconstructed. In its place there's a panoramic soundscape, multiple textures, subtle shifts in emphasis." Tony Fletcher from Jamming! said it was not "an album full of hits. [It is however] a forceful collection of atmospheric ideas and themes, forgettable at first but strangely haunting and soon firmly implanted." Fletcher added that Eno's production removed some of the "heavy metal" from U2 and replaced "emotion [as] the driving force". Hot Press hailed the arrival of producer Brian Eno as "a bold move". Reviewer Liam Mackey said that the album was "rich and rewarding".

In Melody Maker, Adam Sweeting said "The Unforgettable Fire is the other side of the coin from War. Where the latter opened with the shattering paramilitary drumbeat of 'Sunday Bloody Sunday',... Fire launches into the long shimmer of 'A Sort of Homecoming,' whose sort-of-mystical lyric adorns the romantic maroon-and-gold sleeve. The fact is, if you bring your established conception of U2 to this record, you'll be disappointed." Kurt Loder was more critical in Rolling Stone: "U2 flickers and nearly fades, its fire banked by a misconceived production strategy and occasional interludes of soggy, songless self-indulgence. This is not a 'bad' album, but neither is it the irrefutable beauty the band's fans anticipated." The Village Voice critic Robert Christgau felt Bono's moralizing and "wild romantic idealism" proved careless, specifically on "Pride" and "Elvis Presley and America", but concluded that those qualities work well enough for him throughout the rest of the album "to make a skeptic believe temporarily in miracles". At the end of 1984, it was voted the 29th best record of the year in the Pazz & Jop, an annual poll of American critics published in The Village Voice.

== Touring ==
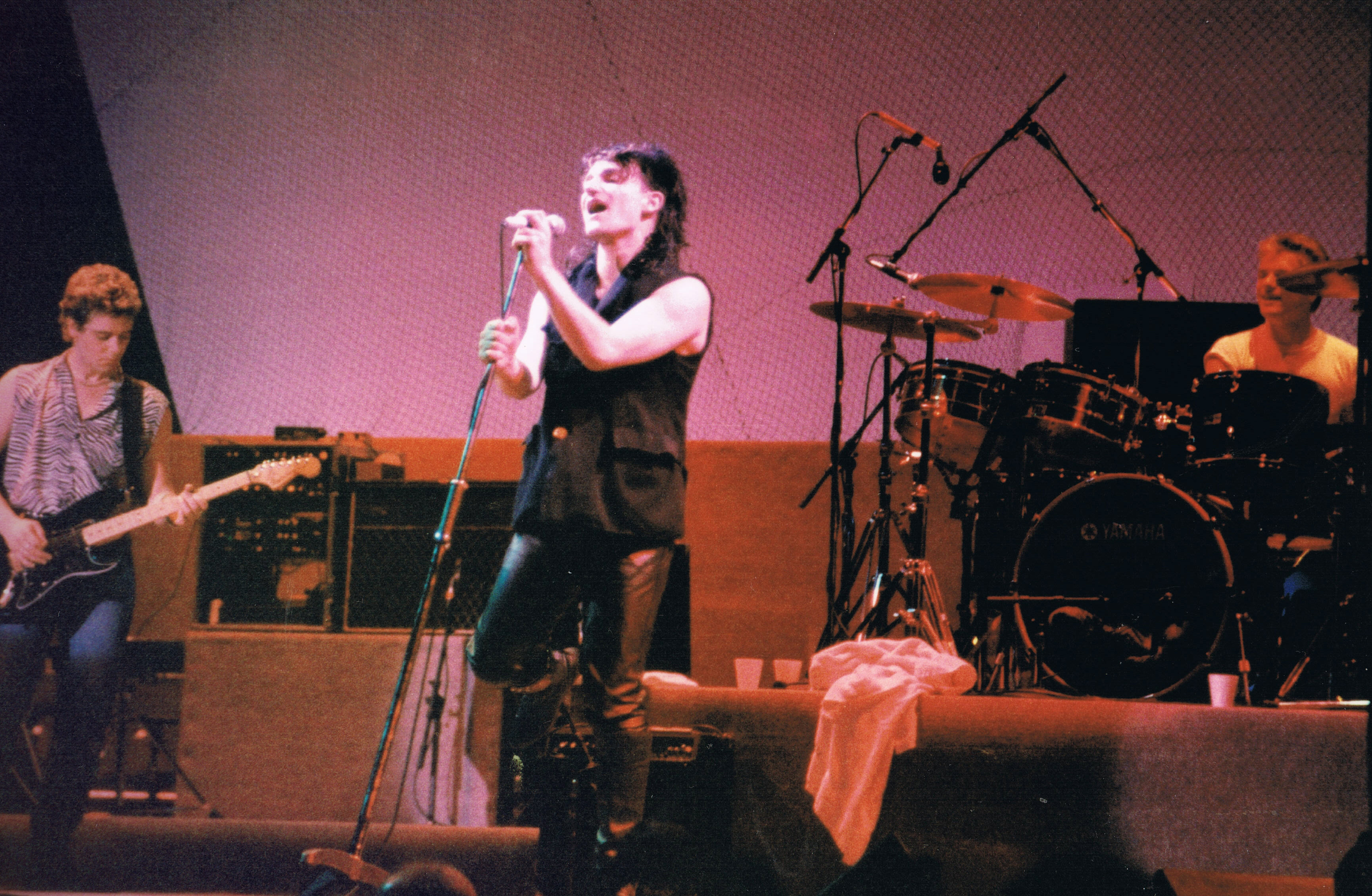
U2 performing on the Unforgettable Fire Tour in Sydney in September 1984

In support of the album, the band embarked on a worldwide concert tour, the Unforgettable Fire Tour, which saw U2 shows moving into indoor arenas in the United States. Consisting of six legs and 112 shows, the tour commenced in New Zealand in August 1984 where translating the elaborate and complex textures of the new studio-recorded tracks to live performance proved to be a serious challenge. One solution was programmed sequencers, which the band had previously been reluctant to use. Sequencers were prominently used on songs like "The Unforgettable Fire" and "Bad"; sequencers are now used on the majority of U2 songs in live performances. Songs criticised as being "unfinished", "fuzzy" and "unfocused" on the album made more sense on stage. Rolling Stone magazine, for example, critical of the album version of "Bad", described its live performance as a "show stopper".

In March 1985, a Rolling Stone cover story called U2 the "Band of the 80's," saying that "for a growing number of rock-and-roll fans, U2 have become the band that matters most, maybe even the only band that matters." In July 1985, U2 participated in the Live Aid benefit concert at Wembley Stadium for Ethiopian famine relief. Their performance was one of the show's most memorable; during a 12-minute performance of the song "Bad", Bono climbed down from the stage to embrace and dance with a female fan he had picked out of the crowd. The length of the song's performance cut their set short by a song. Although the group initially believed they had "blown it", it was, in fact, a breakthrough moment for them, showing a television audience of millions the personal connection that Bono could make with fans. All of U2's previous albums returned to the charts in the UK after their performance.

== Legacy ==
Retrospectively, Bill Graham of Hot Press wrote in 1996 that The Unforgettable Fire was U2's most pivotal album and that it was "their coming of age that saved their lives as a creative unit." Niall Stokes, also of Hot Press, said that "one or two tracks were undercooked" due to the deadline crush but that it was the group's "first album with a cohesive sound" on which "U2 were reborn". By contrast, it was also included in the 1991 book The Worst Rock and Roll Records of All Time. In 2009, reviewing the album's deluxe edition, Will Hermes of Rolling Stone dubbed the album a "transitional, hit-or-miss set", but noted, "When things click, it bridges [War]'s fight-the-power arena rock with the texture fetishism of... The Joshua Tree." Ryan Dombal of Pitchfork praised The Unforgettable Fire as "a transitional album of the highest magnitude" which "ebbs and flows along the spectrum between the spiky, post-punk U2 of old and the impressionistic, Eno-assisted U2 they were yearning to become." In 2023, Robert Crawford of American Songwriter ranked The Unforgettable Fire U2's fourth-best album, calling it "soft-hued and shimmering, balanced equally between moody song sketches and sharply-written singles" and crediting the change in producers for contributing to the band's development. The album ranks at 15 on Colin Larkin's All Time Top 1000 albums.

== Track listing ==
All lyrics are written by Bono; all music is composed by U2.

Side one
| No. | Title | Length |
|---|---|---|
| 1. | "A Sort of Homecoming" | 5:28 |
| 2. | "Pride (In the Name of Love)" | 3:48 |
| 3. | "Wire" | 4:19 |
| 4. | "The Unforgettable Fire" | 4:55 |
| 5. | "Promenade" | 2:35 |

Side two
| No. | Title | Length |
|---|---|---|
| 1. | "4th of July" | 2:12 |
| 2. | "Bad" | 6:09 |
| 3. | "Indian Summer Sky" | 4:17 |
| 4. | "Elvis Presley and America" | 6:23 |
| 5. | "MLK" | 2:31 |
| Total length: | | 42:38 |

Notes
In 1995, Mobile Fidelity Sound Lab remastered the album and released it as a special gold CD. This edition has slightly different running times, most notably an extended 2:39 version of the instrumental "4th of July".

In 1985, the band also released the supplementary Wide Awake in America EP, which offers live performances of "Bad" and "A Sort of Homecoming" along with two B-sides (previously unavailable in North America).

== Personnel ==
U2

- Bono – lead vocals
- The Edge – guitar, keyboards, backing vocals
- Adam Clayton – bass guitar
- Larry Mullen Jr. – drums

Additional musicians

- Brian Eno – additional vocals, instruments, treatments
- Daniel Lanois – additional vocals, instruments, treatments
- Paul Barrett – Fairlight
- Chrissie Hynde – backing vocals on "Pride (In the Name of Love)" (thanked as "Mrs. Christine Kerr" on the record sleeve)
- Peter Gabriel – vocals on "A Sort of Homecoming" (Daniel Lanois Remix)

Technical

- Daniel Lanois – production, engineering
- Brian Eno – production, engineering
- Kevin Killen – additional engineering
- Randy Ezratty – assistant engineering
- Noel Kelehan – string arrangements
- Steve Averill – sleeve design
- Anton Corbijn – sleeve design, photography

== The Unforgettable Fire Collection ==
The Unforgettable Fire Collection

Video by U2
- Released: 1985
- Recorded: 1984–1985
- Genres: Rock, post-punk
- Length: 51:00
- Labels: Island, PolyGram, Columbia
- Directors: Meiert Avis, Barry Devlin, Donald Cammell
- Producer: James Morris

U2 chronology
| Live at Red Rocks: Under a Blood Red Sky (1983) | The Unforgettable Fire Collection (1985) | Rattle and Hum (1988) |

In 1985, The Unforgettable Fire Collection was released. The 51-min VHS compilation contained the album's music videos and a 30-minute making-of documentary of the album. James Morris is credited as producer. The documentary was later included as a bonus feature on the band's live video release, U2 Go Home: Live from Slane Castle, as the site of the concert film—Slane Castle—was also depicted in the documentary.

1. "The Unforgettable Fire" – directed by Meiert Avis
2. "Bad" (Live Video) – directed by Barry Devlin
3. "Pride (In the Name of Love)" (Sepia Version) – directed by Donald Cammell
4. "A Sort of Homecoming" (Live Video) – directed by Barry Devlin
5. The Making of the Unforgettable Fire documentary – directed by Barry Devlin
6. "Pride (In the Name of Love)" (Slane Castle Version) - directed by Barry Devlin

== 25th anniversary edition ==
The record's 25th anniversary was marked by the release of a remastered edition on 27 October 2009 through Mercury Records. The album's remastering was directed by the Edge, who also directed the remastering of the band's previous releases. Four physical editions of the album were made available, two of which contain a bonus CD, and one with a DVD. The bonus CD features B-sides from the album, live tracks and two previously unreleased songs: "Disappearing Act" and "Yoshino Blossom". The DVD features the same material as the original VHS version.

The four editions are as follows:

- CD format – Remastered album on CD
- Deluxe Edition – Remastered album on CD, bonus CD, and 36-page booklet
- Limited Edition Box Set – Remastered album on CD, bonus CD, DVD, 56-page hardback book, and five photographs
- 12" vinyl format – Remastered album on a gramophone record and 16-page booklet

=== Bonus CD ===
| No. | Title | Original release | Length |
|---|---|---|---|
| 1. | "Disappearing Act" | Unreleased track from The Unforgettable Fire sessions, finished in 2009 | 4:35 |
| 2. | "A Sort of Homecoming" (live from Wembley Arena, London) | B-side from "The Unforgettable Fire" single | 4:07 |
| 3. | "Bad" (live from NEC, Birmingham) | From Wide Awake in America EP | 8:00 |
| 4. | "Love Comes Tumbling" | B-side from "The Unforgettable Fire" single | 4:52 |
| 5. | "The Three Sunrises" | B-side from "The Unforgettable Fire" single | 3:53 |
| 6. | "Yoshino Blossom" | Unreleased instrumental track from The Unforgettable Fire sessions | 3:39 |
| 7. | "Wire" (Kevorkian 12" Vocal Remix) | Previously unknown and unreleased remix | 5:12 |
| 8. | "Boomerang I" | B-side from "Pride (In the Name of Love)" single | 2:48 |
| 9. | "Pride (In the Name of Love)" (extended single version) | A-side from "Pride (In the Name of Love)" single | 4:43 |
| 10. | "A Sort of Homecoming" (Daniel Lanois Remix) | Unreleased 1985 single version, featuring Peter Gabriel | 3:18 |
| 11. | "11 O'Clock Tick Tock" (long version) | B-side from "Pride (In the Name of Love)" single | 4:13 |
| 12. | "Wire" (Celtic Dub Mix) | From 1985 NME 7" vinyl promo | 4:36 |
| 13. | "Bass Trap" | B-side from "The Unforgettable Fire" single | 5:15 |
| 14. | "Boomerang II" | B-side from "Pride (In the Name of Love)" single | 4:50 |
| 15. | "4th of July" (single version) | B-side from "Pride (In the Name of Love)" single | 2:26 |
| 16. | "Sixty Seconds in Kingdom Come" | instrumental B-side from "The Unforgettable Fire" single | 3:15 |
| Total length: | | | 69:42 |

=== Bonus DVD ===
In addition to the music videos and documentary from The Unforgettable Fire Collection, the DVD includes:

- U2 live at Amnesty International's A Conspiracy of Hope concert – Giants Stadium, New Jersey, United States – Sunday 15 June 1986
1. "MLK"
2. "Pride (In the Name of Love)"
3. "Bad"
- U2 live at Live Aid – Wembley Stadium, London, United Kingdom – Saturday 13 July 1985
1. "Sunday Bloody Sunday"
2. "Bad"
- "Pride (In the Name of Love)" Sepia music video, directed by Donald Cammell
- "11 O'Clock Tick Tock" – Bootleg version, live from Croke Park, 29 June 1985

== Charts ==
Weekly chart performance for The Unforgettable Fire
| Chart | Peak position |
|---|---|
| Australia (Kent Music Report) | 1 |
| Canadian Albums Chart | 5 |
| New Zealand Albums Chart | 1 |
| Norwegian Albums Chart | 6 |
| Portuguese Albums Chart | 27 |
| Swedish Albums Chart | 6 |
| UK Albums Chart | 1 |
| US Billboard 200 | 12 |

| Chart (2026) | Peak position |
|---|---|
| Greek Albums (IFPI) | 99 |

Weekly chart performance for singles from The Unforgettable Fire
| Year | Song | Peak | | | | | | |
| Year | Song | IRE | CAN | NL | NZ | UK | US Main Rock | US Hot 100 |
|---|---|---|---|---|---|---|---|---|
| 1984 | "Pride (In the Name of Love)" | 2 | 27 | 5 | 1 | 3 | 2 | 33 |
| 1984 | "The Unforgettable Fire" | 1 | — | 4 | 3 | 6 | — | — |
| 1984 | "Wire" | — | — | — | — | — | 31 | — |
| 1985 | "Bad" | — | — | — | — | — | 19 | — |
"—" denotes a release that did not chart.

== Certifications ==
Sales certifications for The Unforgettable Fire
| Region | Certification | Certified units/sales |
|---|---|---|
| Brazil | — | 100,000 |
| Canada (Music Canada) | 3× Platinum | 300,000^{^} |
| France (SNEP) | Gold | 100,000^{*} |
| Italy | — | 200,000 |
| Netherlands (NVPI) | Gold | 50,000^{^} |
| New Zealand (RMNZ) | Platinum | 15,000^{^} |
| Switzerland (IFPI Switzerland) | Gold | 25,000^{^} |
| United Kingdom (BPI) | 2× Platinum | 600,000^{^} |
| United States (RIAA) | 3× Platinum | 3,000,000^{^} |
^{*} Sales figures based on certification alone.^{^} Shipments figures based on certification alone.
