= To Purge This Land with Blood =

1970 book by Stephen B. Oates

To Purge This Land with Blood: A Biography of John Brown
- Second edition
- Author: Stephen B. Oates
- Subject: Biography
- Publisher: Harper & Row
- Publication date: 1970
- Pages: 434
- ISBN: 978-0-06-131655-5

To Purge This Land with Blood: A Biography of John Brown is a 1970 biography of abolitionist John Brown by American historian Stephen B. Oates. The biography triggered a reappraisal of Brown, who was subsequently less likely to be dismissed by historians as irrational.

== Commentary and reviews ==
- "Reservations". The Antioch Review. 30 (2): 266. 1970. ISSN 0003-5769.
- Cardoso, Jack J. (1971). "Review of To Purge This Land With Blood: A Biography of John Brown". The Journal of American History. 57 (4): 922–923. doi:10.2307/1917809. ISSN 0021-8723.
- Dillon, Merton L. (February 1971). "To Purge This Land with Blood: A Biography of John Brown". The Journal of Southern History. 37 (1): 111. doi:10.2307/2205937.
- Eby, Cecil D. (1971). "Review of To Purge This Land with Blood: A Biography of John Brown". The Virginia Magazine of History and Biography. 79 (2): 213–214. ISSN 0042-6636.
- Edelstein, Tilden (March 1971). "John Brown: The Sword and the Word, and: To Purge This Land with Blood: A Biography of John Brown (review)". Civil War History. 17 (1): 60–62. doi:10.1353/cwh.1971.0024.
- Hancock, Scott (2015). "Review of To Raise Up a Nation: John Brown, Frederick Douglass, and the Making of a Free Country". The Journal of Southern History. 81 (2): 460–462. ISSN 0022-4642.
- "Twelve Books Of 1970 (Published 1970)". The New York Times. 6 December 1970.
- Otto, Paul (November 1992). "History as a Humanity: Reading and Literacy in the History Classroom". The History Teacher. 26 (1): 51. doi:10.2307/494085.
- Owsley, F. Lawrence (1970). "Review of To Purge This Land With Blood: A Biography of John Brown". Tennessee Historical Quarterly. 29 (4): 410–411. ISSN 0040-3261.
- Rose, Willie Lee (3 December 1970). "Killing for Freedom". The New York Review of Books.
- Sewell, Richard H. (1971). "Review of George Bourne and The Book and Slavery Irreconcilable; To Purge This Land with Blood: A Biography of John Brown". The American Historical Review. 76 (2): 549–550. doi:10.2307/1858807. ISSN 0002-8762.
- Smylie, James H. (1972). "Review of To Purge This Land With Blood, A Biography of John Brown". Journal of Presbyterian History. 50 (1): 57–59. ISSN 0022-3883.
- Wyatt-Brown, Bertram (1971). "Review of To Purge This Land With Blood: A Biography of John Brown". The Historian. 33 (4): 694–696. ISSN 0018-2370.
