= A Sort of Homecoming (song) =

Song by U2

from the album The Unforgettable Fire
- Released: 1984
- Genre: Rock, post-punk
- Length: 5:28
- Label: Island
- Composer: U2
- Lyricist: Bono
- Producers: Brian Eno, Daniel Lanois

"A Sort of Homecoming" is a song by Irish rock band U2, and is the opening track on their 1984 album, The Unforgettable Fire. A live version of the track is included on their 1985 four-track EP, Wide Awake in America.

== Composition ==
As the opening track on The Unforgettable Fire, "A Sort of Homecoming" epitomises the new direction U2 had taken. A far more atmospheric album than the previous overt-rock of War, the album has a rich and orchestrated sound. Like much of the album, the song replaces the hard-hitting martial drum sound of War with a subtler polyrhythmic shuffle, and the guitar is no longer as prominent in the mix.

On the War Tour and leading up to recording The Unforgettable Fire, U2 lead singer and lyricist, Bono, had become a voracious reader. He read fiction, philosophy and poetry, and came to realise that his songwriting mission — which up to that point had been a reluctant one on his behalf — was a poetic one. He read works of poet Paul Celan, whose line "poetry is a sort of homecoming" inspired not just the song's title but the song itself. Celan's profound spiritual doubt contrasts with the U2 members' previous religious certainties. The song's line "on borderlands we run...and don't look back" suggests the band had become more comfortable with the contradictions between rock and religious beliefs in comparison to during the October-War period. The phrase, "poetry is a sort of homecoming" had additional significance for Bono as a singer who was constantly away from home and travelling.

According to guitarist The Edge in a 1984 interview, producer Daniel Lanois made a reference mix of the instrumental whilst recording the backing track which was difficult to match whilst recording the vocals, hence the vocals were bounced on top of the existing rough mix. According to bassist Adam Clayton, Bono's vocals for the song were re-recorded at the last minute. The band had worked overnight to finish The Unforgettable Fire by 8 a.m. on the final day of the recording sessions so Lanois could deliver the tapes for mastering. As they listened back to the song, Bono said that he wanted to record another take of his vocals. With his taxi to the airport waiting outside, Lanois relented and cued up the tapes, allowing Bono one final take. Lanois told the band that he would mix it at the mastering studio in London and then departed.

"A Sort of Homecoming" is in the key of D. The song has a tempo of 118 beats per minute.

== Video ==
A film of U2 on tour in Northern Europe in October–November 1984 was made to accompany a live version of the song, which was used as a television video to promote The Unforgettable Fire album, showing the band on the road travelling through London, in France and the Low Countries, and in performance at several venues, including the Westfalenhalle in Dortmund, West Germany, returning across the North Sea by ferry boat to the British Isles at the song's conclusion.

== Influence ==
Coldplay lead singer Chris Martin wrote for Rolling Stone magazine's 100 Greatest Artists of All Time the section on U2, saying: "I don't buy weekend tickets to Ireland and hang out in front of their gates, but U2 are the only band whose entire catalogue I know by heart. The first song on The Unforgettable Fire, "A Sort of Homecoming", I know backward and forward — it's so rousing, brilliant and beautiful. It's one of the first songs I played to my unborn baby." Pearl Jam have covered the song on numerous occasions with lead singer Eddie Vedder often playing it by himself on guitar.

== Live performances ==
The live premiere of "A Sort of Homecoming" came during The Unforgettable Fire Tour on 17 September 1984. When played live, the song would start with just The Edge playing while Bono sang. After the first verse, the rest of the band would join in.

It was performed regularly on the rest of The Unforgettable Fire Tour, typically after "The Electric Co.", and was played occasionally on the first two legs of the next tour, The Joshua Tree Tour. It was dropped from the band's live set on 27 June 1987 and did not reappear again until the second leg of the Elevation Tour in 2001.

It was played live again for the first time in 14 years during the band's homecoming gig at Slane Castle in Ireland on 25 August 2001, however the performance did not go well with Bono struggling to recall its original lyrical construction. It made only one more Elevation Tour appearance, when at a concert at the Oakland Arena on 16 November 2001 a fan was invited up on stage by the band to perform on an acoustic guitar, and he began playing the song impromptu. U2 played along but Bono's recollection of the lyrics was even worse than at the Slane Castle gig three months earlier, with him admitting as much mid-song to the audience, and he re-coursed to improvised wordplay instead, during which he cited Van Morrison's work as a source of inspiration for the song originally. A Sort of Homecoming was not performed again until opening night of The Joshua Tree Tour 2017, where it has been performed occasionally in alternation with "Bad."

A live version of the track is found on 1985's four-track EP, Wide Awake in America. It is also the only song with lyrics inside the sleeve for the album.

== Personnel ==
- Bono – lead vocals
- The Edge – guitar, backing vocals
- Adam Clayton – bass guitar
- Larry Mullen Jr. – drums

== Charts ==
Chart (1985)	Peak position
US Billboard Top Rock Tracks	45

== See also ==
- List of covers of U2 songs - A Sort of Homecoming
