= 4th of July (instrumental) =

Instrumental by U2

from the album The Unforgettable Fire
- Released: 1 October 1984
- Genre: Ambient
- Length: 2:12
- Label: Island
- Composer: U2
- Producers: Brian Eno; Daniel Lanois

"4th of July" is an instrumental by Irish rock band U2, and is the sixth track from their 1984 album, The Unforgettable Fire. The track is an ambient instrumental track that was spontaneously improvised by bassist Adam Clayton and guitarist the Edge while producers Brian Eno and Daniel Lanois recorded, unbeknownst to the band. It has never been performed live, although Clayton did play it as a warm-up during a soundcheck before U2's concert in San Jose on 20 April 2001.

== Description ==
"4th of July" came about almost entirely through a moment of inspiration from Eno through capturing a moment. At the end of a studio session, Eno overheard Adam Clayton doodling on a simple bass figure, with guitarist The Edge joining in and improvising a few bottleneck guitar ideas over the top of Clayton's bass. Eno liked what he was hearing, so unbeknownst to both of them, he recorded it ad hoc as it was being played, straight to two-track 1/4-inch master tape - and that was the instrumental finished, with no possibility of redoing parts of it later. Eno added further treatments on Edge's guitar sound whilst recording, resulting in keyboard-like sounds even though there are two instruments playing throughout. Eventually, the piece would be forgotten about until it was unearthed at the end of the sessions, and Bono insisted on its inclusion on The Unforgettable Fire. A two-minute excerpt of the 10-minute-long improvisation was included.

U2 called it "4th of July" to commemorate the birth of Edge's daughter and Bono's godchild, Hollie, who was born during the album sessions on 4 July 1984.

It is the only instrumental on a regular full-length U2 album (not including Passengers). It was frequently used as the last piece of music played before U2 took the stage during the Unforgettable Fire Tour. It regularly played on Music Choice's "Sounds of the Seasons" channel when playing patriotic music in the days leading to (and during) Independence Day in the United States, which falls on 4 July.
