= The Unforgettable Fire Tour =

1984–85 concert tour by U2

- Tour by U2
- Location: Oceania; Europe; North America
- Associated album: The Unforgettable Fire
- Start date: 29 August 1984
- End date: 25 August 1985
- Legs: 6
- No. of shows: 111
- Supporting acts: Matt Finish; Big Audio Dynamite; The Alarm; Red Rockers; Lone Justice; Squeeze; R.E.M.; In Tua Nua

U2 concert chronology
- War Tour (1982–1983); The Unforgettable Fire Tour (1984–1985); A Conspiracy of Hope (1986)

The Unforgettable Fire Tour was a concert tour by the Irish rock band U2 that took place in 1984 and 1985 in support of the band's album The Unforgettable Fire. Beginning in August 1984 with the band's first tour to Australia and New Zealand, the tour spanned four further legs which included 43 concerts in Europe and 50 in North America.

Initially challenged by the sonic complexity of the new album's material, the band were able to translate the complex layered atmospheric textures of the new studio-recorded tracks to live performance through the use of programmed sequencers, which the band until then had been reluctant to use. Since then sequencers are now used on the majority of U2 songs in performance. Songs criticised as being "unfinished", "fuzzy" and "unfocused" on the album, including the live favourite, "Bad", made more sense on stage.

For the first time, U2 consistently played in arenas instead of smaller halls and theatres, and sometimes for multiple nights. The group had reached the level of popularity where this was possible, but had not yet broken out into widespread fame and familiarity among the general rock and pop audience; that would come in 1987 with the release of The Joshua Tree. The band's now renowned performance at Live Aid in July 1985, was watched by millions on television and brought them to a new level of fame and exposure.

== Itinerary ==
=== Leg 1: Under Australian Skies ===
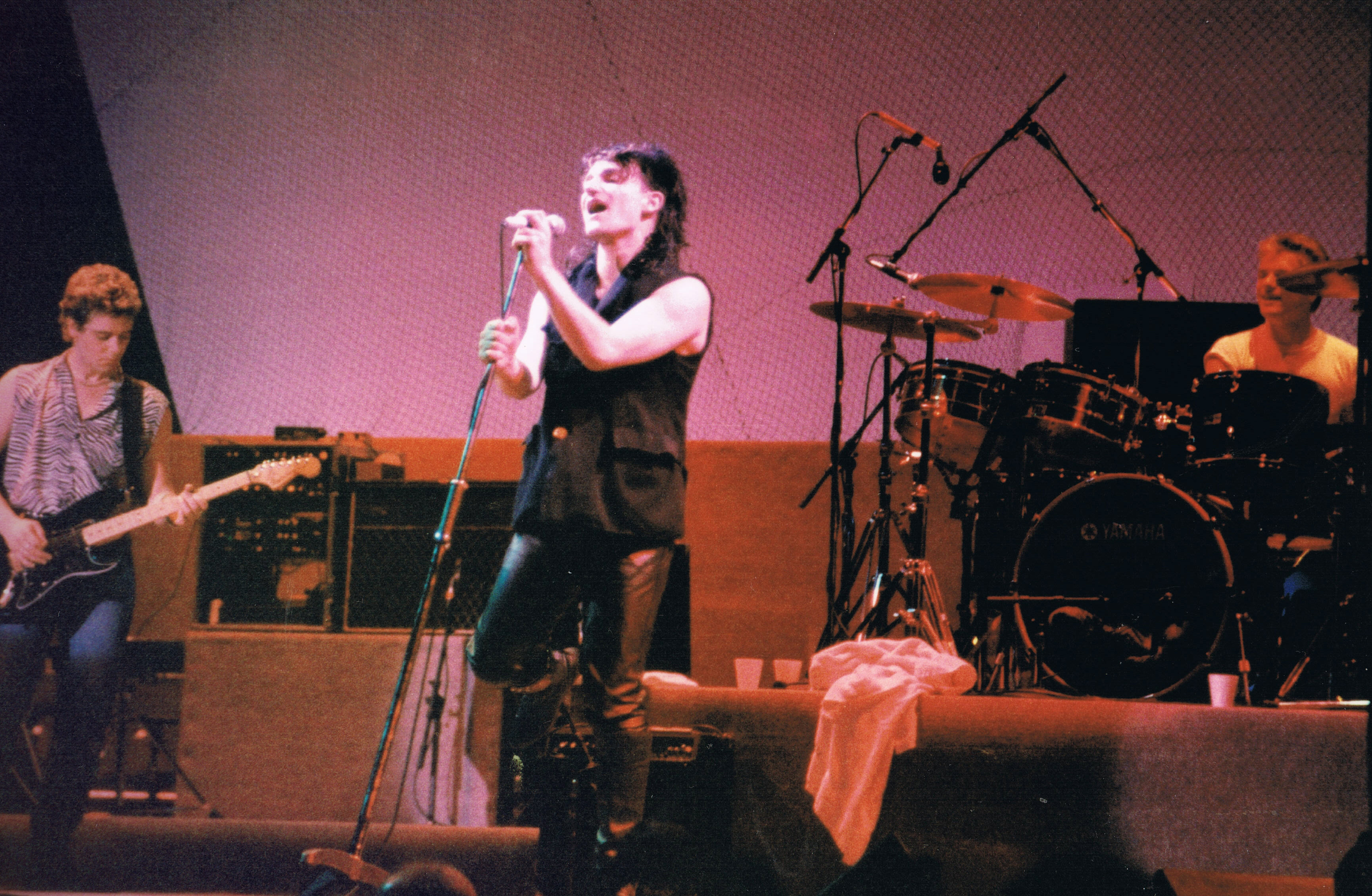
U2 performing in Sydney in September 1984

Dubbed the leg "Under Australian Skies", the band's first tour of Australia and New Zealand took place between The Unforgettable Fire's completion and its release. Plans to visit the two countries were discussed in 1982, and the band had intended to play there in late 1983 but were too tired from the War Tour. Although it had taken years to build up an audience through constant touring in Europe and North America, the band started playing sports arenas straightaway in Australia and New Zealand. The first show was on 29 August 1984 at the Town Hall Auditorium in Christchurch.

Six shows were added when the first nine sold out. 60,000 tickets were sold for five sell-out shows at the Sydney Entertainment Centre, which was the band's largest audience to date in a single city. Not having had time to rehearse the new album's songs for live performance, and as they had never played the two countries before, the band played a setlist based on the previous "War Tour". New songs from the album were rehearsed during soundchecks, and "Pride (In the Name of Love)"—which was released as the album's first single in August—and "The Unforgettable Fire" were played from the fourth date onwards. The final Australian show was on 24 September 1984 at Perth Entertainment Centre, and The Unforgettable Fire was released on 1 October 1984.

=== Leg 2: Europe ===
The tour's second leg consisted of 21 shows in halls and arenas in Western Europe, and ran during October and November 1984. Following the largely War Tour setlist and presentation of the first leg, the band adapted the shows to the dreamy nature of the new album, and transformed the visual nature of the show. Pursuing a more subtle stage presentation, the band relied more on the moods transcending from the music and lighting as opposed to Bono's active stage antics of previous tours. When "The Unforgettable Fire" song was played, for example, slides with Japanese writings and lithographs from the exhibit from which the song takes its name were projected onto a white backdrop. During "New Years Day", long white banners were lowered from the ceiling, and during "Pride", a portrait of Martin Luther King Jr. was projected. While illustrating the songs, the images were intended to bridge the gap between the audience rather than having Bono run around the stage.

The leg was initially meant to start in Rotterdam on 1 October, the day of the album's release, but concerts between 1 and 17 October were postponed until 1985 or cancelled to allow U2 more time to rehearse the new songs. Translating the complex layered atmospheric textures of the new studio-recorded tracks to live performance proved a serious challenge. One solution was programmed sequencers, which the band until then had been reluctant to use, on sonically elaborate new songs such as "The Unforgettable Fire" and "Bad". Since then sequencers are now used on the majority of U2 songs in performance. Songs criticised as being "unfinished", "fuzzy" and "unfocused" on the album, made more sense on stage. Rolling Stone, for example, critical of the album version of "Bad", described its live performance as a 'show stopper'.

=== Leg 3: North America ===
The third leg was 10 dates in major United States cities in December 1984, and was intended to gain positive notices in the press and provide a teaser of a major American tour in the first half of 1985. While a couple of shows were in arenas, most shows were in halls and theatres and demand for tickets significantly outstripped supply indicating that U2 would no longer be able to play these smaller venues.

=== Leg 4: Europe ===
After a five-week break, the band returned to Western Europe for 13 shows in January and February 1985, playing cities that had been missed on the previous European leg, including replacement shows for those cancelled in October 1984. The leg included 5 shows in West Germany and the band's first concert in Italy.

=== Leg 5: North America ===
The fifth leg comprised 40 shows, in 29 cities in the United States and Canada. It ran from late February to early May 1985, and was played solely in arenas for the first time, with multiple nights in many of the locations.

The band had reached the level of popularity where this was possible, but had not yet broken out into widespread fame and familiarity among the general rock and pop audience; that would come in 1987 with the release of The Joshua Tree. The Unforgettable Fire Tour popularity level is sometimes referred to as "mass cult", and is similar to, say, what Bruce Springsteen had on his River Tour before Born in the U.S.A. or what Metallica had on their Damaged Justice tour before their Black Album. It made for intense concerts in this instance, because it provided a very large but fully devoted audience, with fans standing on chairs for the entire performance and continuing "40" refrains long after the show was over.

=== Leg 6: European Summer Festivals ===
U2 received 12 invitations to play from European festival promoters of which they played nine from late May through to mid July 1985. Also in this period, they played a homecoming concert at Dublin's Croke Park, their first headlining show in a stadium.

== Live Aid ==
U2 participated in the Live Aid concert at Wembley Stadium for Ethiopian famine relief on 13 July 1985. During the song "Bad", Bono leapt down off the stage to embrace and dance with a fan. Initially thinking they'd "blown it", it was a breakthrough moment for the band, showing a television audience of millions the personal connection that Bono could make with audiences.

All of U2's albums re-entered the charts in the UK after their performance. In 1985, Rolling Stone called U2 the "Band of the 80's", saying that "for a growing number of rock-and-roll fans, U2 have become the band that matters most, maybe even the only band that matters."

== Performance ==
A fashion industry friend of Clayton's, Marian Smyth, was contacted to organise a concert wardrobe for the band. She shopped in London, Paris, and Florence and showed the band her suggestions during their May 1984 recording sessions at Slane Castle. When the band asked her for advice for someone to go manage their wardrobe on tour, she nominated herself.

Some Unforgettable Fire numbers were not even attempted, although "4th of July" was played over the PA as an introduction and cue for the band.

A performance of "Bad", from National Exhibition Centre in Birmingham on 11 November 1984, was released on the Wide Awake in America EP in May 1985, and was chosen by many radio programmers for airplay over the studio version. "Bad" was also the highlight of the Live Aid performance mentioned above, and has continued to be played up through the band's 360° Tour. After being played relatively rarely during the Innocence and Experience tour, It was resurrected (with snippets of Simon & Garfunkel's "America") for the Joshua Tree Tours 2017 and 2019.

As with all U2 tours from 1983 on, the stage and lighting design for the Unforgettable Fire Tour was done by Willie Williams. In this case, the stage was plain and the lighting was very austere, mostly all white except when use of colour would be meaningful.

== Supporting acts ==
Red Rockers and Lone Justice split the opening act assignment during the long North American leg. Matt Finish supported the band in Australia, the Mockers in New Zealand. Waterboys supported for UK dates.

== Tour dates ==
Date	City	Country	Venue	Opening acts	Attendance	Revenue
Leg 1: Oceania (Under Australian Skies)
29 August 1984	Christchurch	New Zealand	Christchurch Town Hall	—N/a	—N/a	—N/a
31 August 1984	Wellington	New Zealand	Show Building	—N/a	—N/a	—N/a
1 September 1984	Auckland	New Zealand	Logan Campbell Centre	—N/a	—N/a	—N/a
2 September 1984	Auckland	New Zealand	Logan Campbell Centre	—N/a	—N/a	—N/a
4 September 1984	Sydney	Australia	Sydney Entertainment Centre	Matt Finish	—N/a	—N/a
5 September 1984	Sydney	Australia	Sydney Entertainment Centre	Matt Finish	—N/a	—N/a
6 September 1984	Sydney	Australia	Sydney Entertainment Centre	Matt Finish	—N/a	—N/a
8 September 1984	Sydney	Australia	Sydney Entertainment Centre	Matt Finish	—N/a	—N/a
9 September 1984	Sydney	Australia	Sydney Entertainment Centre	Matt Finish	—N/a	—N/a
11 September 1984	Brisbane	Australia	Brisbane Festival Hall	—N/a	—N/a	—N/a
13 September 1984	Melbourne	Australia	Sports and Entertainment Centre	—N/a	—N/a	—N/a
14 September 1984	Melbourne	Australia	Sports and Entertainment Centre	—N/a	—N/a	—N/a
15 September 1984	Melbourne	Australia	Sports and Entertainment Centre	—N/a	—N/a	—N/a
17 September 1984	Melbourne	Australia	Sports and Entertainment Centre	—N/a	—N/a	—N/a
18 September 1984	Melbourne	Australia	Sports and Entertainment Centre	—N/a	—N/a	—N/a
20 September 1984	Adelaide	Australia	Apollo Entertainment Centre	—N/a	—N/a	—N/a
21 September 1984	Adelaide	Australia	Apollo Entertainment Centre	—N/a	—N/a	—N/a
23 September 1984	Perth	Australia	Perth Entertainment Centre	—N/a	—N/a	—N/a
24 September 1984	Perth	Australia	Perth Entertainment Centre	—N/a	—N/a	—N/a
Leg 2: Europe
18 October 1984	Lyon	France	Halle Tony Garnier	Big Audio Dynamite	—N/a	—N/a
19 October 1984	Marseille	France	Marseilles Stadium	Big Audio Dynamite	—N/a	—N/a
20 October 1984	Toulouse	France	Palais des Sports	Big Audio Dynamite	—N/a	—N/a
22 October 1984	Bordeaux	France	Patinoire	Big Audio Dynamite	—N/a	—N/a
23 October 1984	Nantes	France	St Herblain	Big Audio Dynamite	—N/a	—N/a
25 October 1984	Paris	France	Espace Ballard	The Alarm	—N/a	—N/a
27 October 1984	Brussels	Belgium	Forest National	The Alarm	—N/a	—N/a
28 October 1984	Brussels	Belgium	Forest National	The Alarm	—N/a	—N/a
30 October 1984	Rotterdam	Netherlands	Ahoy	—N/a	—N/a	—N/a
31 October 1984	Rotterdam	Netherlands	Ahoy	—N/a	—N/a	—N/a
2 November 1984	London	England	Brixton Academy	—N/a	—N/a	—N/a
3 November 1984	London	England	Brixton Academy	—N/a	—N/a	—N/a
5 November 1984	Edinburgh	Scotland	Playhouse	—N/a	—N/a	—N/a
6 November 1984	Glasgow	Scotland	Barrowlands	—N/a	—N/a	—N/a
7 November 1984	Glasgow	Scotland	Barrowlands	—N/a	—N/a	—N/a
9 November 1984	Manchester	England	Apollo	—N/a	—N/a	—N/a
10 November 1984	Manchester	England	Apollo	—N/a	—N/a	—N/a
12 November 1984	Birmingham	England	National Exhibition Centre	—N/a	—N/a	—N/a
14 November 1984	London	England	Wembley Arena	—N/a	—N/a	—N/a
15 November 1984	London	England	Wembley Arena	—N/a	—N/a	—N/a
21 November 1984 (Note: The concert in Dortmund on 21 November 1984 was part of RockPop in Concert.)	Dortmund	West Germany	Westfalenhallen	—N/a	—N/a	—N/a
Leg 3: North America
1 December 1984	Upper Darby	United States	Tower Theater	—N/a	—N/a	—N/a
2 December 1984	Worcester	United States	The Centrum	—N/a	11,058 / 11,058	$144,029
3 December 1984	New York City	United States	Radio City Music Hall	—N/a	5,874 / 5,874	$91,146
5 December 1984	Washington, D.C.	United States	DAR Constitution Hall	—N/a	—N/a	—N/a
7 December 1984	Toronto	Canada	Massey Hall	—N/a	—N/a	—N/a
8 December 1984	Detroit	United States	Fox Theatre	—N/a	—N/a	—N/a
9 December 1984	Cleveland	United States	Music Hall	—N/a	—N/a	—N/a
11 December 1984	Chicago	United States	Aragon Ballroom	—N/a	5,500 / 5,500	$66,480
15 December 1984	San Francisco	United States	Civic Auditorium	—N/a	8,472 / 8,472	$114,780
16 December 1984	Long Beach	United States	Long Beach Arena	—N/a	13,974 / 13,974	$179,978
Leg 4: Europe
23 January 1985	Drammen	Norway	Drammenshallen	—N/a	—N/a	—N/a
25 January 1985	Stockholm	Sweden	Stockholm Ice Stadium	—N/a	—N/a	—N/a
26 January 1985	Gothenburg	Sweden	Scandinavium	—N/a	—N/a	—N/a
28 January 1985	Hamburg	West Germany	Kongresszentrum	—N/a	—N/a	—N/a
29 January 1985	Offenbach	West Germany	Stadthalle Offenbach	—N/a	—N/a	—N/a
31 January 1985	Cologne	West Germany	Sporthalle	—N/a	—N/a	—N/a
1 February 1985	Mannheim	West Germany	Musensaal	—N/a	—N/a	—N/a
2 February 1985	Munich	West Germany	Rudi-Sedlmayer-Halle	—N/a	—N/a	—N/a
4 February 1985	Milan	Italy	Teatro Tenda Lampugnano	—N/a	—N/a	—N/a
5 February 1985	Bologna	Italy	Teatro Tenda	—N/a	—N/a	—N/a
6 February 1985	Bologna	Italy	Teatro Tenda	—N/a	—N/a	—N/a
8 February 1985	Zürich	Switzerland	Hallenstadion	—N/a	—N/a	—N/a
10 February 1985	Paris	France	Palais Omnisports de Paris-Bercy	—N/a	—N/a	—N/a
Leg 5: North America
25 February 1985	Dallas	United States	Reunion Arena	—N/a	—N/a	—N/a
26 February 1985	Austin	United States	Frank Erwin Center	—N/a	11,633 / 11,633	$133,339
27 February 1985	Houston	United States	The Summit	—N/a	—N/a	—N/a
1 March 1985	Phoenix	United States	Compton Terrace	—N/a	—N/a	—N/a
2 March 1985	Los Angeles	United States	Sports Arena	—N/a	45,071 / 45,071	$648,014
4 March 1985	Los Angeles	United States	Sports Arena	—N/a	45,071 / 45,071	$648,014
5 March 1985	Los Angeles	United States	Sports Arena	—N/a	45,071 / 45,071	$648,014
7 March 1985	Daly City	United States	Cow Palace	—N/a	29,000 / 29,000	$391,500
8 March 1985	Daly City	United States	Cow Palace	—N/a	29,000 / 29,000	$391,500
11 March 1985	Honolulu	United States	Neal S. Blaisdell Arena	—N/a	8,178 / 8,850	$110,402
17 March 1985	Denver	United States	McNichols Sports Arena	—N/a	17,457 / 17,457	$217,464
19 March 1985	Minneapolis	United States	Minneapolis Auditorium	—N/a	—N/a	—N/a
21 March 1985	Chicago	United States	University of Illinois Pavilion	Red Rockers	—N/a	—N/a
22 March 1985	Chicago	United States	University of Illinois Pavilion	—N/a	—N/a	—N/a
23 March 1985	Detroit	United States	Joe Louis Arena	—N/a	—N/a	—N/a
25 March 1985	Richfield	United States	Richfield Coliseum	—N/a	—N/a	—N/a
27 March 1985	Montreal	Canada	Montreal Forum	—N/a	—N/a	—N/a
28 March 1985	Toronto	Canada	Maple Leaf Gardens	—N/a	17,000 / 17,000	$225,403
30 March 1985	Ottawa	Canada	Ottawa Civic Centre	—N/a	—N/a	—N/a
1 April 1985	New York City	United States	Madison Square Garden	—N/a	—N/a	—N/a
2 April 1985	Providence	United States	Providence Civic Center	—N/a	13,349 / 13,349	$169,569
3 April 1985	Uniondale	United States	Nassau Coliseum	—N/a	—N/a	—N/a
8 April 1985	Landover	United States	Capital Centre	—N/a	—N/a	—N/a
9 April 1985	Pittsburgh	United States	Civic Arena	—N/a	16,049 / 16,049	—N/a
10 April 1985	Hampton	United States	Hampton Coliseum	—N/a	—N/a	—N/a
12 April 1985	East Rutherford	United States	Brendan Byrne Arena	—N/a	61,715 / 61,715	$786,957
14 April 1985	East Rutherford	United States	Brendan Byrne Arena	—N/a	61,715 / 61,715	$786,957
15 April 1985	East Rutherford	United States	Brendan Byrne Arena	—N/a	61,715 / 61,715	$786,957
16 April 1985	Worcester	United States	The Centrum	Lone Justice	37,416 / 37,416	$482,391
18 April 1985	Worcester	United States	The Centrum	Lone Justice	37,416 / 37,416	$482,391
19 April 1985	Worcester	United States	The Centrum	Lone Justice	37,416 / 37,416	$482,391
20 April 1985	Hartford	United States	Hartford Civic Center	—N/a	15,606 / 15,506	$203,869
22 April 1985	Philadelphia	United States	Spectrum	—N/a	18,455 / 18,455	$233,031
23 April 1985	Hartford	United States	Hartford Civic Center	Lone Justice	15,606 / 15,506	$203,869
24 April 1985	Philadelphia	United States	Spectrum	Lone Justice	18,455 / 18,455	$233,031
29 April 1985	Atlanta	United States	The Omni	—N/a	—N/a	—N/a
30 April 1985	Jacksonville	United States	Jacksonville Memorial Coliseum	Red Rockers	—N/a	—N/a
2 May 1985	Tampa	United States	Sun Dome	—N/a	10,907 / 11,200	$147,244
3 May 1985	Pembroke Pines	United States	Hollywood Sportatorium	—N/a	—N/a	—N/a
4 May 1985	Pembroke Pines	United States	Hollywood Sportatorium	—N/a	—N/a	—N/a
Leg 6: European Summer Festivals
25 May 1985 (Note: The concert in Nürburg on 25 May 1985 was part of Rock am Ring.)	Nürburg	West Germany	Nürburgring	—N/a	—N/a	—N/a
26 May 1985 (Note: The concert in Stuttgart on 26 May 1985 was part of the Rock in Stuttgart festival.)	Stuttgart	West Germany	Neckarstadion	—N/a	—N/a	—N/a
27 May 1985 (Note: The concert in Münster on 27 May 1985 was part of the Rock in Münster festival.)	Münster	West Germany	Freigelande Halle Munsterland	—N/a	—N/a	—N/a
1 June 1985	Basel	Switzerland	St. Jakob Stadium	—N/a	—N/a	—N/a
22 June 1985 (Note: The concert in Milton Keynes on 22 June 1985 was part of the Longest Day Concert.)	Milton Keynes	England	Milton Keynes Bowl	—N/a	—N/a	—N/a
29 June 1985	Dublin	Ireland	Croke Park	Squeeze; The Alarm; R.E.M. In Tua Nua	—N/a	—N/a
6 July 1985 (Note: The concert in Torhout on 6 July 1985 was part of Torhout Festival.)	Torhout	Belgium	Torhout Festivalpark	—N/a	—N/a	—N/a
7 July 1985 (Note: The concert in Werchter on 7 July 1985 was part of Werchter Festival.)	Werchter	Belgium	Werchter Festivalpark	—N/a	—N/a	—N/a
13 July 1985 (Note: The concert in London on 13 July 1985 was part of Live Aid.)	London	England	Wembley Stadium	—N/a	—N/a	—N/a
25 August 1985 (Note: The concert in Cork on 25 August 1985 was part of Lark by the Lee.)	Cork	Ireland	The Lee Fields	—N/a	—N/a	—N/a

== See also ==
- Timeline of U2
