= Bad (U2 song) =

1984 song by U2

Promotional single by U2

from the album The Unforgettable Fire
- Released: 1 October 1984
- Genre: Rock
- Length: 6:09 (album version); 4:20 (single edit)
- Label: Island
- Composer: U2
- Lyricist: Bono
- Producers: Brian Eno; Daniel Lanois

"Bad" is a song by Irish rock band U2 and the seventh track on their 1984 album The Unforgettable Fire. Thematically, the song is about heroin addiction, though lead vocalist Bono has given varying accounts of who was the inspiration behind his lyrics. "Bad" is considered a fan favourite and is one of U2's most frequently performed songs in concert. The band's 12-minute performance of the song at the Live Aid charity concert in 1985 was a breakthrough moment for them.

A live version of the song appears on U2's 1985 EP Wide Awake in America; this rendition became popular on album-oriented rock radio stations. In the United States, the song peaked at number 19 on the Billboard Top Rock Tracks chart. The album version of the song featured on the trailer of the 2009 film Brothers and in the opening and closing sequences of the 2004 film Taking Lives.

== History ==
"Bad" originated from a guitar riff that the Edge improvised during a jam session at Slane Castle, where U2 were recording their 1984 album The Unforgettable Fire. The basic track was completed in three takes. Of its immediate and live nature, the Edge said, "There's one moment where [drummer] Larry [Mullen Jr.] puts down brushes and takes up the sticks and it creates this pause which has an incredibly dramatic effect." Producer Brian Eno added the sequencer arpeggios that accompany the song.

The early 1980s recession had led to a high number of heroin addicts in inner city Dublin. In concert, lead vocalist Bono frequently introduced the song as a song about Dublin. The Edge and the album's producers, Eno and Daniel Lanois, were focused on the music and were less interested in the lyrics. Bono said that he left the song unfinished.

During the 3 December 1984 concert at Radio City Music Hall in New York City for the Unforgettable Fire Tour, Bono said the song was about heroin and that he wrote it for a friend and also for himself; in discussing this comment during a 17 December radio interview, Bono said, "Well, I think I said I wrote the song for a friend of mine; I also wrote it for myself because you can be addicted to anything. And, you know, that song's not just about heroin: it's about a lot of things. None of our songs, really, are just about one thing."

Bono's account from a 1987 concert in Chicago during the Joshua Tree Tour indicates "Bad" is about a friend of his who suffered a heroin overdose and also about the conditions that make such events likely to be repeated. Bono once commented in another concert (in the UK) about people lying in gutters with "needles hangin' outta their fuckin' arms while the rich live indifferently to the suffering of the less fortunate." At Eriksberg, Gothenburg in Sweden 1987, he named the friend who inspired the song: "I wrote the words about a friend of mine; his name was Guck Pants Delaney, and on his 21st birthday he and his friends decided to give themselves a present of enough heroin into his veins to kill him. This song is called 'Bad.'" He was referring to Andy Rowen by his Lypton Village nickname. Rowen is the brother of Bono's Lypton Village friend Guggi and Peter Rowen, who is featured on the sleeve artwork for the band's albums Boy (1980) and War (1983).

During a 26 July 2011 concert in Pittsburgh during the U2 360° Tour, Bono again attributed the lyrics to the song as being about Andy Rowen. Bono introduced the performance of "Bad" as a song written for a "very special man, who is here in your city, who grew up on Cedarwood Road. We wrote this song about him and we play it for him tonight."

== Live performances ==
"Bad" is one of the band's most performed songs. Translating the elaborate and complex textures of the new studio-recorded tracks to live performance proved to be a serious challenge when the Unforgettable Fire Tour commenced. One solution was programmed sequencers, which the band had previously been reluctant to use. Sequencers were prominently used on "Bad".

The studio version of "Bad" was criticised as being "unfinished", "fuzzy" and "unfocused", but the band found that it made more sense on stage. Rolling Stone, for example, critical of the album version, described its live performance as a "show stopper".

A staple of U2's concert tours of the 1980s, "Bad" was also frequently performed during the first four legs of the 1992–1993 Zoo TV Tour. Although not played until the fourth leg of the PopMart Tour of 1997 and 1998, it returned to the normal set list for 2001's Elevation Tour and saw occasional performances during the Vertigo Tour of 2005 and 2006, sometimes even appearing as the closing song for shows. It made very sporadic appearances on the U2 360° Tour and has featured occasionally on the 2015 Innocence + Experience Tour.

The song once again returned to the normal setlist for both the Joshua Tree Tours 2017 and 2019, typically being played early on in the set with other pre-The Joshua Tree era hits. The Experience + Innocence Tour however (which took place in 2018 between the 2017 and 2019 legs of The Joshua Tree anniversary tours) did not feature a single performance of the song, making it the first tour in U2's history where the song was not performed.

Bono is known for singing a wide variety of snippets during performances of "Bad". Lyrics from over 50 different songs have been included in "Bad", ranging from brief quotes of a single line through to multiple verses. These snippets are typically sung after the line "I'm not sleeping" and Bono has included up to six different excerpts in a single performance of "Bad". Performances without at least one snippet are very rare.

=== Live Aid ===
U2 participated in the Live Aid concert at Wembley Stadium for Ethiopian famine relief on 13 July 1985. They played a 12-minute version of "Bad", which was extended by snippets of Lou Reed's "Satellite of Love" and "Walk on the Wild Side", and The Rolling Stones' "Ruby Tuesday" and "Sympathy for the Devil". During the performance, Bono leaped down off the stage to embrace and dance with a fan. In 2005 the girl with whom he danced, who was at the front to see Wham!, revealed that he actually saved her life at the time. She was being crushed by the throngs of people pushing forwards; Bono saw this, and gestured frantically at the ushers to help her. They did not understand what he was saying, and so he jumped down to help her himself. Bono's rescue of and dance with the girl was captured on the TV broadcast sent around the world. The performance was so long that the band were only able to play two of the three songs in their set, leaving out "Pride (In the Name of Love)", which was supposed to end the band's performance. The concert turned out to be a breakthrough moment for the band, showing a television audience of millions the personal connection that Bono could make with audiences. A week later, Bono realized that the dance with the fan became a key image of Live Aid. All of U2's albums re-entered the UK Albums Chart after their performance.

== Discography ==
"Bad" is the first track on the 1985 EP Wide Awake in America, this being a live version recorded at Birmingham's NEC Arena on November 12, 1984 during sound check. This version includes prerecorded rhythm tracks. There are no other snippets of songs on this version for copyright reasons. Three other versions of "Bad" have been officially released by the band. An edit of the version from The Unforgettable Fire appears on the 1998 compilation The Best of 1980–1990; with the exception of the hidden version of "October", "Bad" is the only non-single to appear on the compilation. In addition to the live performance included on Wide Awake in America, a live version from 1987's Joshua Tree Tour appears in the rockumentary Rattle and Hum and a version from 2001's Elevation Tour appears in the concert film Elevation 2001: Live from Boston (with a snippet of "40" at the end and therefore credited as "Bad / '40'"). For the release of the 2004 digital box set The Complete U2, another live version of "Bad" was included on the live album Live from the Point Depot.

An acoustic version of "Bad" with lyrical changes is included on U2's 2023 album Songs of Surrender.

== Charts ==
Chart (1985)	Peak position
US Billboard Top Rock Tracks	19

== See also ==
- List of covers of U2 songs – Bad
