= Stephen B. Oates =

American historian and academic (1936–2021)

- Born: January 5, 1936; Pampa, Texas, U.S.
- Died: August 20, 2021 (aged 85); Amherst, Massachusetts, U.S.
- Education: University of Texas at Austin (BA, MA, DPhil)
- Writing career
- Notable works: Let the Trumpet Sound; The Life of Martin Luther King Jr. (1982), With Malice Toward None: The Life Of Abraham Lincoln (1977)
- Notable awards: Robert F. Kennedy Book Award; Nevins-Freeman Award

Stephen Baery Oates (January 5, 1936 – August 20, 2021) was an American historian. He was a professor of history at the University of Massachusetts Amherst. He specialized in the American Civil War era and authored numerous books.

== Early life and education ==
Stephen Baery Oates was born in Pampa, Texas, on January 5, 1936. He obtained a bachelor's degree from the University of Texas at Austin in 1958. He remained at that institution, receiving a Master of Arts two years later. He taught at Texas for four years before being awarded a Doctor of Philosophy in 1969.

== Career ==
Oates began teaching at the University of Massachusetts Amherst in 1968. He was a professor of history and the Paul Murray Kendall Professor of Biography there until 1997. He also wrote 20 books during his career. Many were biographies of 19th-century American historical figures. In the biographies of John Brown, Nat Turner, Abraham Lincoln, and Martin Luther King Jr., Oates examined the lives of men committed to the struggle for equality. He wrote that "[a]ll four were driven, visionary men, all were caught up in the issues of slavery and race, and all devised their own solutions to those inflammable problems [a]nd all perished, too, in the conflicts and hostilities that surrounded the quest for equality in this country."

Oates was accused of plagiarism in 1993, when an early artificial intelligence engine identified a couple of "language and rhetorical strategies of other scholars" among the tens of thousands of sentences he published throughout his career. He was ultimately cleared by the University of Massachusetts and the American Historical Association. In 2002, Lincoln biographer Michael Burlingame restated the charge that Oates committed plagiarism in his Lincoln biography.

Oates was a commentator in the 1990 Ken Burns PBS miniseries, The Civil War. Of Oates, Burns said: “Stephen was an extremely valuable advisor to our Civil War series and an informed and passionate participant. He knew the bottom-up story as well as the top-down one, but more importantly, he knew and appreciated the huge stakes for the US and indeed the world in a Union victory."

== Awards and honors ==
Oates won several awards over his three decades as a professor, including the 1981 “Distinguished Teaching Award” from University of Massachusetts and a silver medal and was semi-finalist in “National Professor of the Year Competition” from the Council for Advancement and Support of Education in 1986 and 1987.

Let the Trumpet Sound; The Life of Martin Luther King Jr. received the Robert F. Kennedy Center for Justice and Human Rights 1983 Book Award presented annually to the book that "most faithfully and forcefully reflects Robert Kennedy's purposes – his concern for the poor and the powerless, his struggle for honest and even-handed justice, his conviction that a decent society must assure all young people a fair chance, and his faith that a free democracy can act to remedy disparities of power and opportunity." A decade later, Oates received the 1993 Nevins-Freeman Award of the Chicago Civil War Round Table for his historical work on the American Civil War.

== Personal life ==
Oates was married to Helen (Perry) Oates. They divorced, and she died in 2019. Together, they had two children. Oates died on August 20, 2021, at his home in Amherst, Massachusetts. He was 85.

== Books ==
External videos
- Booknotes interview with Oates on Approaching Fury: Voices of the Storm, 1820–1861, April 27, 1997, C-SPAN
- Presentation by Oates on Whirlwind of War: Voices of the Storm, 1861–1865 at the Lincoln Forum, November 18, 1997, C-SPAN

- Confederate Cavalry West of the River, 1961, ISBN 978-0-292-73197-4
- Rip Ford's Texas, 1963 (editor), ISBN 978-0-292-78920-3
- The Republic of Texas, 1968 (editor), OCLC 449067
- To Purge This Land with Blood: A Biography of John Brown, 1970, ISBN 978-0-06-131655-5
- Visions of Glory: Texans on the Southwestern Frontier, 1970, ISBN 978-0-8061-0898-8
- The Fires of Jubilee: Nat Turner's Fierce Rebellion, 1975, ISBN 978-0-06-091670-1
- With Malice Toward None: The Life of Abraham Lincoln, 1977, ISBN 978-0-06-092471-3
- Our Fiery Trial: Abraham Lincoln, John Brown, and the Civil War Era, 1979, ISBN 978-0-87023-261-9
- Let the Trumpet Sound: The Life of Martin Luther King, Jr., 1982, ISBN 978-0-06-014993-2
- Abraham Lincoln: The Man Behind The Myths, 1984, Harper Perennial, ISBN 978-0060924720 (paperback reprint 2011, ISBN 978-0-452-00734-5)
- "The Ravages of War" (essay) in Touched by Fire: A Photographic Portrait of the Civil War (1985) ISBN 978-0-316-17661-3
- Biography as High Adventure: Life-Writers Speak on Their Art, 1986, ISBN 978-0-87023-514-6
- William Faulkner: The Man and the Artist, 1987, ISBN 978-0-06-015771-5
- Biography as History, 1990, ISBN 978-0-918954-54-1
- A Woman of Valor: Clara Barton and the Civil War, 1994, ISBN 978-0-02-923405-1
- Approaching Fury: Voices of the Storm, 1820–1861, 1997, ISBN 978-0-06-016784-4
- Whirlwind of War: Voices of the Storm, 1861–1865, 1998, ISBN 978-0-06-092885-8
- Portrait of America: From Before Columbus to the End of Reconstruction (2 vols., 7th edition), 1999, ISBN 978-0-395-90078-9
