= U2 discography =

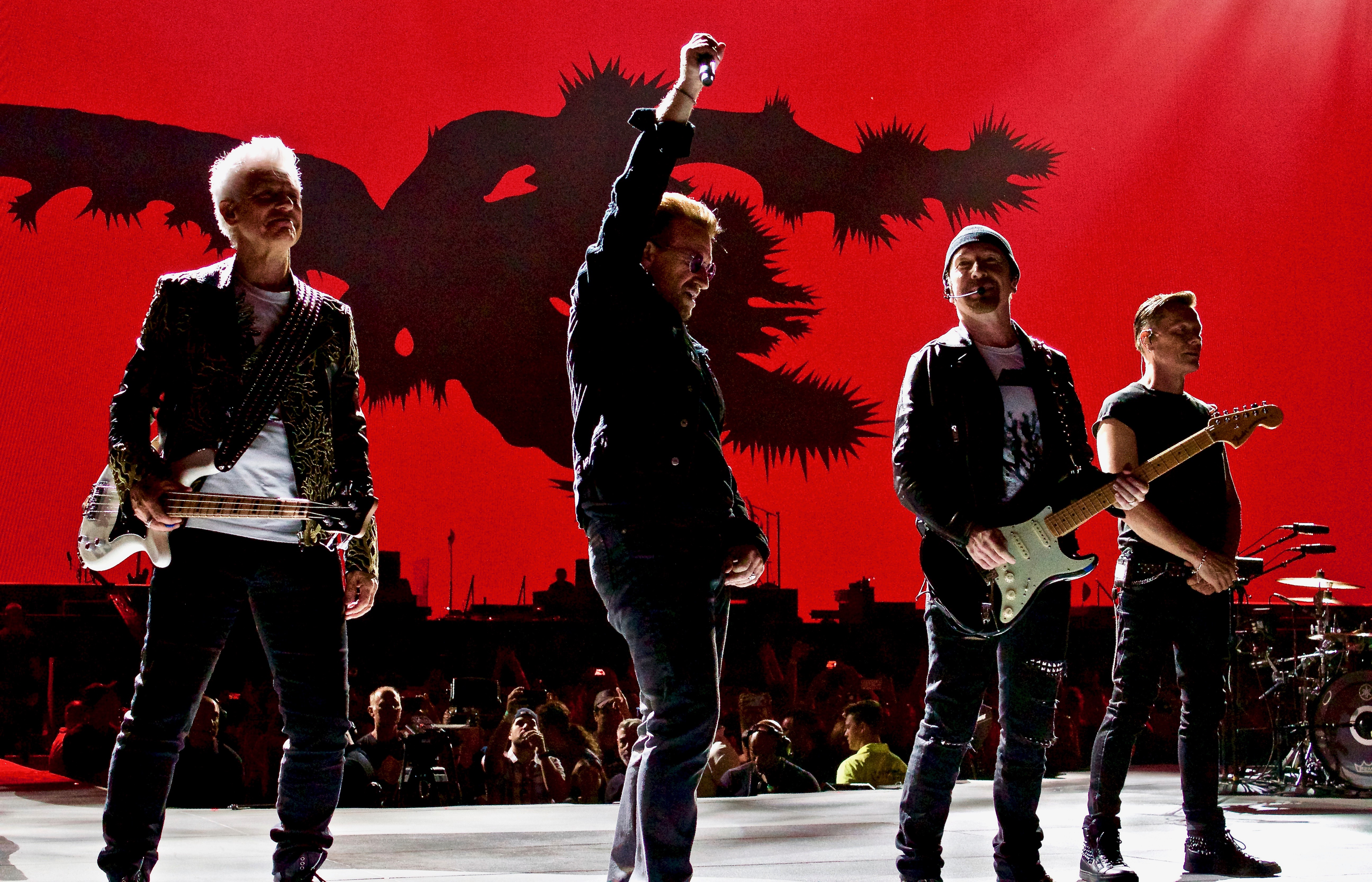
- U2 performing on the Joshua Tree Tour 2017
- Studio albums: 16
- Extended plays: 12
- Live albums: 2
- Compilation albums: 3
- Singles: 85
- Video albums: 16
- Music videos: 73
- Subscriber-exclusive albums: 15
- Box sets: 2

The Irish rock band U2 has released 16 studio albums, two live albums, three compilation albums, 85 singles, and twelve extended plays (EPs). The band formed at Mount Temple Comprehensive School in 1976 as teenagers. In 1979, the group issued their first release, the EP U2-3, which sold well in Ireland. The following year, the group signed to Island Records and released their debut album, Boy. It reached number 52 in the UK and number 63 in the US. They followed it up with the release of October (1981) and War (1983). War was a commercial success, becoming the band's first number-one album in the UK while reaching number 12 in the US. The album included the singles "Two Hearts Beat as One", "Sunday Bloody Sunday" and "New Year's Day". On the subsequent War Tour, the group recorded the live album Under a Blood Red Sky and concert film U2 Live at Red Rocks, both of which sold well and helped establish them globally as a live act.

The band shifted towards a more ambient, abstract musical direction for The Unforgettable Fire (1984), their first collaboration with producers Brian Eno and Daniel Lanois. The album went to number one in the UK and produced the group's biggest hit to that point, the UK top-10 single "Pride (In the Name of Love)". The group's fifth album, The Joshua Tree (1987), made them international superstars and was a critical and commercial success, reaching number one in over 20 countries; it is one of the best-selling albums in the US (10 million copies shipped) and worldwide (25 million copies sold). It produced their only number-one singles in the US, "With or Without You" and "I Still Haven't Found What I'm Looking For". U2 followed this up with the 1988 release of Rattle and Hum, a double album and companion documentary film which documented their experiences with American roots music from the Joshua Tree Tour with a collection of new studio tracks, cover songs, and live recordings. The lead single "Desire" was the band's first number-one single in the UK. The album sold over 14 million copies, while the film grossed $8.6 million.

Facing a backlash from Rattle and Hum and creative stagnation, U2 reinvented themselves musically in the 1990s. The band's following album, Achtung Baby (1991), marked a dramatic shift towards alternative rock, industrial music, and electronic dance music. It debuted at number one in the US, eventually sold 18 million copies worldwide, and spawned five singles, including "One", "Mysterious Ways", and the UK number-one "The Fly". U2's follow up albums Zooropa and Pop continued the band's experimentation with alternative rock and electronic dance music, reaching number one worldwide but with reduced sales. U2 regained commercial favour with the release of All That You Can't Leave Behind in 2000, returning to a more mainstream sound. The album sold over 12 million copies and won seven Grammy Awards. It spawned several successful singles, including "Beautiful Day", "Walk On", "Elevation", and "Stuck in a Moment You Can't Get Out Of". The following album, How to Dismantle an Atomic Bomb (2004), was promoted with the popular lead single "Vertigo". The album was another commercial success and ultimately won all nine of its Grammy Award nominations. The group's twelfth album, No Line on the Horizon (2009), reached number one in 30 countries but its sales of 5 million were seen as a disappointment by the band, and it did not contain a hit single. Their 2014 album Songs of Innocence was released at no cost to over 500 million iTunes Store users but the pervasiveness of the promotion brought controversy; the album's sales and charting duration were among the weakest in the band's discography. In 2017, U2 released Songs of Experience and began the 2017 and 2019 Joshua Tree Tours to commemorate the 30th anniversary of The Joshua Tree.

U2 have sold 170 million records worldwide. With 52 million certified units by the RIAA, U2 rank as the 22nd-highest-selling music artist in the US. U2 have eight albums that have reached number one in the US, the third-most of any group.

== Albums ==
=== Studio albums ===
List of studio albums, with selected chart positions and certifications
Title	Album details	Peak chart position										Sales	Certifications
Title	Album details	IRL	AUS	CAN	FRA	GER	NZ	SWE	SWI	UK	US	Sales	Certifications
Boy	Released: 20 October 1980; Label: Island; Format: LP, cassette	13*	35	12	—	—	13	38	—	52	63		ARIA: Gold; BPI: Gold; MC: Platinum; RIAA: Platinum; SNEP: Gold
October	Released: 12 October 1981; Label: Island; Format: LP, cassette	17*	34	—	—	—	6	40	—	11	104		ARIA: Gold; BPI: Platinum; RIAA: Platinum; SNEP: Gold
War	Released: 28 February 1983; Label: Island; Format: LP, cassette, CD	16*	9	4	4	59	5	2	—	1	12	WW: 11,000,000	ARIA: 2× Platinum; BPI: 2× Platinum; BVMI: Gold; IFPI SWI: Gold; MC: 3× Platinum; RIAA: 4× Platinum; RMNZ: Platinum; SNEP: 2× Platinum
The Unforgettable Fire	Released: 1 October 1984; Label: Island; Format: LP, cassette, 8-track, CD	1	1	5	—	14	1	6	24	1	12		BPI: 2× Platinum; MC: 3× Platinum; RIAA: 3× Platinum; RMNZ: Platinum; SNEP: Gold
The Joshua Tree	Released: 9 March 1987; Label: Island; Format: LP, cassette, 8-track, CD	1	3	1	1	1	1	1	1	1	1	UK: 3,197,086; WW: 25,000,000	ARIA: 5× Platinum; BPI: 10× Platinum; BVMI: 2× Platinum; IFPI SWE: Platinum; MC: Diamond; RIAA: Diamond; RMNZ: 14× Platinum; SNEP: 2× Platinum
Rattle and Hum	Released: 10 October 1988; Label: Island; Format: Double LP, 8-track, cassette, CD	1	1	1	8	1	1	2	1	1	1	WW: 14,000,000	ARIA: 7× Platinum; BPI: 4× Platinum; BVMI: Platinum; IFPI SWE: Gold; IFPI SWI: 2× Platinum; MC: 7× Platinum; RIAA: 5× Platinum; RMNZ: Platinum; SNEP: Platinum
Achtung Baby	Released: 18 November 1991; Label: Island; Format: LP, cassette, CD, DCC	1	1	1	1	4	1	3	3	2	1	WW: 18,000,000	ARIA: 5× Platinum; BPI: 4× Platinum; BVMI: Platinum; IFPI SWE: Platinum; IFPI SWI: Gold; MC: Diamond; RIAA: 8× Platinum; RMNZ: 5× Platinum; SNEP: 2× Platinum
Zooropa	Released: 5 July 1993; Label: Island; Format: LP, cassette, CD	1	1	1	1	1	1	1	1	1	1	WW: 7,000,000	ARIA: 3× Platinum; BPI: Platinum; BVMI: Gold; IFPI SWE: Gold; MC: 4× Platinum; RIAA: 2× Platinum; RMNZ: 4× Platinum; SNEP: Platinum
Pop	Released: 3 March 1997; Label: Island; Format: Double LP, cassette, CD	1	1	1	1	1	1	1	1	1	1	US: 1,500,000; WW: 5,000,000	ARIA: Platinum; BPI: Platinum; BVMI: Gold; IFPI SWE: Gold; IFPI SWI: Platinum; MC: 3× Platinum; RIAA: Platinum; RMNZ: 2× Platinum; SNEP: Platinum
All That You Can't Leave Behind	Released: 30 October 2000; Label: Island/Interscope; Format: LP, cassette, CD	1	1	1	1	1	1	1	2	1	3	FRA: 550,000; UK: 1,170,000; US: 4,400,000; WW: 12,000,000	ARIA: 5× Platinum; BPI: 4× Platinum; BVMI: 3× Gold; IFPI SWE: Platinum; IFPI SWI: 2× Platinum; MC: 5× Platinum; RIAA: 4× Platinum; RMNZ: 3× Platinum; SNEP: Platinum
How to Dismantle an Atomic Bomb	Released: 22 November 2004; Label: Island/Interscope; Format: LP, cassette, CD, download	1	1	1	1	1	1	1	1	1	1	US: 3,300,000; WW: 10,000,000	IRMA: 10× Platinum; ARIA: 4× Platinum; BPI: 4× Platinum; BVMI: 3× Gold; IFPI SWE: Platinum; MC: 5× Platinum; RIAA: 3× Platinum; RMNZ: 3× Platinum; SNEP: Platinum
No Line on the Horizon	Released: 27 February 2009; Label: Island/Interscope; Formats: CD, LP, download	1	1	1	1	1	1	2	1	1	1	US: 1,100,000; WW: 5,000,000	IRMA: 4× Platinum; ARIA: Platinum; BPI: Platinum; BVMI: Platinum; IFPI SWE: Platinum; IFPI SWI: Platinum; MC: 2× Platinum; RIAA: Platinum; RMNZ: Platinum
Songs of Innocence	Released: 9 September 2014; Label: Island; Formats: CD, LP, download	2	7	5	1	2	6	2	3	6	9	UK: 62,620; US: 101,000	BPI: Silver; BVMI: Gold
Songs of Experience	Released: 1 December 2017; Label: Island; Formats: CD, LP, download	1	5	1	3	2	9	2	2	5	1	WW: 1,300,000	BPI: Gold; BVMI: Gold; MC: Gold; SNEP: 2× Platinum
Songs of Surrender	Released: 17 March 2023; Label: Island/Interscope; Formats: CD, LP, cassette, download	1	3	5	2	1	8	2	1	1	5		SNEP: Gold
Carnaval de Luz	Released: 13 November 2026; Label: Island/Interscope; Formats: CD, LP, cassette, download	1	1	—	—	1	2	1	1	1	—	UK: 42,512; US: 59,222	
"—" denotes a recording that did not chart or was not released in that territory. "*" information comes from a source which started recording data in 2005.

=== Live albums ===
List of live albums, with selected chart positions and certifications
Title	Album details	Peak chart positions							Certifications
Title	Album details	IRL	AUS	BEL (WA)	GER	SWE	UK	US	Certifications
Under a Blood Red Sky	Released: 21 November 1983; Label: Island Records; Format: LP, cassette, CD	48	2	39	20	22	2	28	ARIA: 4× Platinum; BVMI: Platinum; BPI: 3× Platinum; MC: 2× Platinum; RIAA: 3× Platinum; RMNZ: Platunum; SNEP: Platinum
Live from Paris	Released: 20 November 2007; Label: Mercury Records; Format: DVD, digital download	—	—	—	—	—	—	54	

=== Compilation albums ===
List of compilation albums, with selected chart positions and certifications
Title	Album details	Peak chart positions										Certifications
Title	Album details	IRL	AUS	AUT	CAN	NLD	NZ	SWE	SWI	UK	US	Certifications
The Best of 1980–1990	Released: 10 November 1998; Label: Island Records; Format: LP, cassette, CD	1	1	1	1	1	1	1	1	1	2	ARIA: 8× Platinum; BPI: 5× Platinum; IFPI AUT: 2× Platinum; IFPI SWE: Gold; IFPI SWI: 3× Platinum; MC: 6× Platinum; RIAA: 4× Platinum; RMNZ: 9× Platinum
The Best of 1990–2000	Released: 12 November 2002; Label: Island Records; Format: LP, cassette, CD	1	1	1	1	1	1	6	1	2	3	ARIA: 2× Platinum; BPI: 2× Platinum; IFPI AUT: Platinum; IFPI SWE: Gold; IFPI SWI: 2× Platinum; MC: 3× Platinum; RIAA: Platinum; RMNZ: 4× Platinum
U218 Singles	Released: 17 November 2006; Label: Island Records; Format: LP, cassette, CD	1	1	2	3	3	1	4	1	4	12	IRMA: 6× Platinum; ARIA: 5× Platinum; BPI: 4× Platinum; IFPI SWI: Platinum; MC: Platinum; RMNZ: 4× Platinum

=== Collaborations ===
Title	Album details	Peak chart positions					
Title	Album details	AUS	CAN	FIN	NLD	UK	US
Original Soundtracks 1 (with Brian Eno as "Passengers")	Released: 6 November 1995; Label: Island Records; Format: LP, cassette, CD	11	15	32	38	12	76

=== Box sets ===
Title	Album details
The Complete U2	Released: 23 November 2004; Label: Island Records; Format: Download
The Italian Collection	Released: 16 August 2016; Label: Island Records; Format: CD

=== Subscriber-exclusive albums ===
List of subscriber-exclusive albums
Title	Album details
Melon: Remixes for Propaganda	Remix album; Propaganda fan club magazine subscriber exclusive; Released: 30 March 1995; Label: Island Records; Format: CD
Hasta la Vista Baby! U2 Live from Mexico City	Live album; Propaganda fan club magazine subscriber exclusive; Released: September 2000; Label: Island Records; Format: CD
U2.Communication	Live album; U2.com member exclusive; Released: 22 April 2005; Label: Island Records; Format: CD
Zoo TV Live	Live album; U2.com member exclusive; Released: 18 November 2006; Label: Island Records; Format: CD
U2 Go Home: Live from Slane Castle, Ireland	Live album; U2.com subscriber exclusive; Released: 21 November 2007; Label: Island Records; Format: CD
Medium, Rare & Remastered	Compilation album; U2.com subscriber exclusive; Released: 27 March 2009; Label: Island Records; Format: CD
Artificial Horizon	Remix album; U2.com subscriber exclusive; Released: 25 March 2010; Label: Island Records; Format: CD, triple LP
Duals	Compilation album; U2.com subscriber exclusive; Released: 10 May 2011; Label: Island Records; Format: CD
U22	Live album; U2.com subscriber exclusive; Released: 1 May 2012; Label: Island Records; Format: CD
From the Ground Up: Edge's Picks from U2360°	Live album; U2.com subscriber exclusive; Released: 17 December 2012; Label: Island Records; Format: CD
Another Time, Another Place: Live at the Marquee London 1980	Live album; U2.com subscriber exclusive; Released: 2015; Label: Island Records; Format: LP, MP3
The Joshua Tree Singles Vinyl Collection: 1987 & 2017	Studio/live album; U2.com subscriber exclusive; Released: 2017; Label: Island Records; Format: LP, MP3
3-D Dance Mixes	Remix album; U2.com subscriber exclusive; Released: 2018 (originally 1989); Label: Island Records (originally Island Records UK); Format: LP, MP3
Live Songs of iNNOCENCE + eXPERIENCE	Live album; U2.com subscriber exclusive; Released: 2019; Label: Island Records; Format: CD, MP3
Live at the Apollo	Live album; U2.com subscriber exclusive; Released: 2021; Label: Island Records; Format: CD
Achtung Baby 30 – Live	Live album; U2.com subscriber exclusive; Released: 2022; Label: Island Records; Format: CD

=== Anniversary re-release bonus albums ===
List of anniversary re-release bonus albums
Title	Album details
Kindergarten – the Alternative Achtung Baby	Included with 20th anniversary re-release of Achtung Baby; Released: 31 October 2011; Label: Island Records
How to Re-assemble an Atomic Bomb	Included with 20th anniversary re-release of How to Dismantle an Atomic Bomb; Released: 22 November 2024; Label: Island Records

== Extended plays ==
Title	Extended play details	Peak chart positions									Certifications
Title	Extended play details	IRL	AUS	AUT	FIN	FRA	GER	SWI	UK	US	Certifications
Three	Released: September 1979; Label: CBS Ireland; Format: 12-inch vinyl, 7-inch vinyl	19	—	—	—	—	—	—	—	—	
Wide Awake in America	Released: May 1985; Label: Island Records; Format: 12-inch vinyl, cassette, 8-track, CD	—	93	—	36	—	—	—	11	37	BPI: Silver; RIAA: Platinum
Please: PopHeart Live EP	Released: 8/9 September 1997; Label: Island Records; Format: 12-inch vinyl, cassette, CD	—	—	—	—	—	—	—	7	—	
7	Released: 22 January 2002; Label: Island Records; Format: CD	—	—	—	—	—	—	—	—	—	
Exclusive	Released: 24 April 2003; Label: Island Records; Format: Download	—	—	—	—	—	—	—	—	—	
Early Demos	Released: 23 November 2004; Label: Island Records; Format: Download	—	—	—	—	—	—	—	—	—	
Live from Under the Brooklyn Bridge	Released: 9 December 2004; Label: Island Records; Format: Download	—	—	—	—	—	—	—	—	—	
Wide Awake in Europe	Released: 26 November 2010; Label: Island Records; Format: 12-inch single	—	—	—	—	—	—	—	—	—	
The Europa EP	Released: 13 April 2019; Label: UMC; Format: 12-inch single	—	—	—	—	—	—	—	—	—	
Zoo TV – Live in Dublin 1993	Released: 30 August 2024; Label: UMC; Format: CD, 12-inch vinyl, digital download	13	—	11	—	48	9	50	47	—	
Days of Ash	Released: 18 February 2026; Label: Island Records; Format: Digital download	32	54	14	—	123	87	8	— (Note: Days of Ash did not enter the UK Albums Chart, but peaked at number 1 on the UK Album Downloads Chart.)	—	
Easter Lily	Released: 3 April 2026; Label: Island Records; Format: Digital download	26	30	11	—	174	—	18	87	—	
"—" denotes releases that did not chart.

== Singles ==
Title	Year	Peak chart positions										Certifications	Album
Title	Year	IRL	AUS	CAN	FRA	NLD	NZ	SWE	SWI	UK	US	Certifications	Album
"Out of Control"	1979	19	—	—	—	—	—	—	—	—	—		Three
"Another Day"	1980	—	—	—	—	—	—	—	—	—	—		Non-album singles
"11 O'Clock Tick Tock"	1980	69 (Note: "11 O'Clock Tick Tock" did not enter the Irish Singles Chart in 1980 but did chart at #69 in September 2020.)	—	—	—	—	—	—	—	—	—		Non-album singles
"A Day Without Me"	1980	—	—	—	—	—	—	—	—	—	—		Boy
"I Will Follow"	1980	—	71	—	—	—	34	—	—	—	—		Boy
"Fire"	1981	4	—	—	—	—	—	—	—	35	—		October
"Gloria"	1981	10	32	—	—	—	15	—	—	55	—		October
"A Celebration"	1982	15	83	—	—	—	—	—	—	47	—		Non-album singles
"I Will Follow" (live from Hattem)	1982	—	—	—	—	22	—	—	—	—	—		Non-album singles
"New Year's Day"	1983	2	36	41	—	9	32	17	—	10	53	RMNZ: Gold (live)	War
"Two Hearts Beat as One"	1983	2	53	—	—	—	16	—	—	18	— (Note: "Two Hearts Beat as One" did not enter the Billboard Hot 100, but peaked at #1 on the Bubbling Under Hot 100 Singles chart.)		War
"Sunday Bloody Sunday"	1983	—	—	—	95	3	—	—	—	—	—	BPI: Gold; RMNZ: Platinum	War
"I Will Follow" (live from West Germany)	1984	—	—	—	—	—	—	—	—	—	81		Under a Blood Red Sky
"Pride (In the Name of Love)"	1984	2	4	26	—	5	1	12	—	3	33	BPI: Gold; RMNZ: Platinum	The Unforgettable Fire
"The Unforgettable Fire"	1985	1	59	—	—	4	3	—	—	6	—		The Unforgettable Fire
"With or Without You"	1987	1	9	1	10	2	5	13	10	4	1	BPI: 4× Platinum; MC: Gold; RMNZ: 5× Platinum; SNEP: Platinum	The Joshua Tree
"I Still Haven't Found What I'm Looking For"	1987	1	17	6	37	6	2	11	18	6	1	BPI: 2× Platinum; MC: Gold; RMNZ: 3× Platinum	The Joshua Tree
"Where the Streets Have No Name"	1987	1	27	11	123	7	1	—	—	4	13	BPI: Platinum; RMNZ: Platinum	The Joshua Tree
"In God's Country"	1987	—	—	25	—	—	—	—	—	48	44		The Joshua Tree
"One Tree Hill"	1988	—	—	—	—	—	1	—	—	—	—	RMNZ: Gold	The Joshua Tree
"Desire"	1988	1	1	1	37	2	1	5	9	1	3	BPI: Silver; MC: Gold; RIAA: Gold; RMNZ: Gold	Rattle and Hum
"Angel of Harlem"	1988	3	18	1	—	10	1	—	25	9	14		Rattle and Hum
"When Love Comes to Town" (with B.B. King)	1989	1	23	41	200	10	4	20	—	6	68		Rattle and Hum
"All I Want Is You"	1989	1	2	67	—	12	2	—	—	4	83	ARIA: Platinum; BPI: Silver; RMNZ: Platinum	Rattle and Hum
"Everlasting Love"	1990	—	—	—	—	10	—	—	—	—	—		Non-album single (previously released as B-side to "All I Want Is You")
"The Fly"	1991	1	1	16	6	5	1	3	3	1	61	ARIA: Gold; BPI: Silver; RMNZ: Platinum	Achtung Baby
"Mysterious Ways"	1991	1	3	1	19	13	3	17	13	13	9	ARIA: Gold; RMNZ: Gold	Achtung Baby
"One"	1992	1	4	1	13	12	3	—	25	7	10	BPI: Platinum; RMNZ: 2× Platinum	Achtung Baby
"Even Better Than the Real Thing"	1992	3	11	3	34	11	8	10	18	12	32		Achtung Baby
"Even Better Than the Real Thing" (remix)	1992	10	167	—	—	—	—	—	—	8	—		Achtung Baby
"Who's Gonna Ride Your Wild Horses"	1992	4	9	5	10	14	13	19	24	14	35		Achtung Baby
"Numb" (video single)	1993	—	7	9	—	—	13	—	—	—	— (Note: "Numb" was not eligible to enter the Billboard Hot 100, but peaked at number 61 on the Hot 100 Airplay chart.)		Zooropa
"Lemon"	1993	—	6	20	—	—	4	—	—	—	— (Note: "Lemon" did not enter the Billboard Hot 100, but peaked at number three on the Bubbling Under Hot 100 Singles chart.)	ARIA: Gold; RMNZ: Platinum	Zooropa
"Stay (Faraway, So Close!)" (Note: "Stay (Faraway, So Close!)" was listed as a double-A side with Frank Sinatra and Bono's version of "I've Got You Under My Skin" on the UK singles chart.)	1993	1	5	14	18	10	6	13	20	4	61	ARIA: Gold; BPI: Silver	Zooropa
"Hold Me, Thrill Me, Kiss Me, Kill Me"	1995	1	1	3	10	7	1	2	5	2	16	ARIA: Gold; BPI: Gold; RMNZ: Gold; SNEP: Silver	Batman Forever soundtrack
"Miss Sarajevo"	1995	4	7	46	8	5	23	35	10	6	—	BPI: Silver	Original Soundtracks 1
"Discothèque"	1997	1	3	2	12	6	1	2	6	1	10	ARIA: Platinum; BPI: Silver; RIAA: Gold	Pop
"Staring at the Sun"	1997	4	23	1	49	19	4	26	29	3	26		Pop
"Last Night on Earth"	1997	11	32	18	—	14	36	43	—	10	57		Pop
"Please"	1997	6	21	47	31	6	32	33	35	7	— (Note: "Please" did not enter the Billboard Hot 100, but peaked at number three on the Bubbling Under Hot 100 Singles chart.)		Pop
"If God Will Send His Angels"	1997	11	—	26	—	24	35	56	—	12	—		Pop
"Mofo"	1997	—	35	—	—	—	—	—	—	—	—		Pop
"Sweetest Thing"	1998	1	6	1	18	7	3	6	28	3	63	ARIA: Gold; BPI: Gold; IFPI SWE: Gold; RMNZ: Platinum	The Best of 1980–1990
"Beautiful Day"	2000	1	1	1	17	1	7	7	6	1	21	ARIA: Platinum; BPI: Platinum; RIAA: Gold; RMNZ: 2× Platinum	All That You Can't Leave Behind
"Stuck in a Moment You Can't Get Out Of"	2001	1	3	1	31	12	17	23	38	2	52	ARIA: Gold; BPI: Silver; RMNZ: Gold	All That You Can't Leave Behind
"Elevation"	2001	1	6	1	34	1	35	33	20	3	— (Note: "Elevation" did not enter the Billboard Hot 100, but peaked at number 16 on the Bubbling Under Hot 100 Singles chart.)	BPI: Silver	All That You Can't Leave Behind
"Walk On"	2001	7	9	1	81	8	48	55	48	5	— (Note: "Walk On" did not enter the Billboard Hot 100, but peaked at number 18 on the Bubbling Under Hot 100 Singles chart.)		All That You Can't Leave Behind
"New Year's Dub" (as U2 vs. Musique)	2001	13	74	—	—	55	—	—	93	15	—		Non-album single
"Electrical Storm"	2002	2	5	1	18	4	5	13	5	5	77	ARIA: Gold	The Best of 1990–2000
"Take Me to the Clouds Above" (as LMC vs. U2)	2004	3	7	21	21	16	—	21	41	1	—	ARIA: Gold; BPI: Platinum	Non-album single
"Vertigo"	2004	1	5	2	12	2	5	2	6	1	31	ARIA: Gold; BPI: Gold; RIAA: Gold; RMNZ: Gold	How to Dismantle an Atomic Bomb
"All Because of You"	2005	4	23	1	—	4	—	37	36	4	— (Note: "All Because of You" did not enter the Billboard Hot 100, but peaked at number one on the Bubbling Under Hot 100 Singles chart.)		How to Dismantle an Atomic Bomb
"Sometimes You Can't Make It on Your Own"	2005	3	19	1	60	5	12	24	39	1	97	BPI: Silver	How to Dismantle an Atomic Bomb
"City of Blinding Lights"	2005	8	31	2	89	3	—	8	41	2	—		How to Dismantle an Atomic Bomb
"Sgt. Pepper's Lonely Hearts Club Band" (with Paul McCartney)	2005	—	—	—	—	—	—	—	—	—	48		Non-album single
"One" (with Mary J. Blige)	2006	2	— (Note: "One" did not enter the ARIA Singles Chart, but peaked at number six on the ARIA Digital Track Chart.)	35	35	3	—	27	2	2	86	BPI: Silver	The Breakthrough
"The Saints Are Coming" (with Green Day)	2006	1	1	1	44	1	4	4	1	2	51		U218 Singles
"Window in the Skies"	2007	5	17	1	—	2	28	38	34	4	—		U218 Singles
"The Ballad of Ronnie Drew" (with The Dubliners, Kila, and A Band of Bowsies)	2008	1	—	—	—	—	—	—	—	—	—		Non-album single
"Get On Your Boots"	2009	1	26	3	6	5	20	8	65	12	37		No Line on the Horizon
"Magnificent"	2009	5	—	68	15	6	—	16	45	42	79		No Line on the Horizon
"I'll Go Crazy If I Don't Go Crazy Tonight"	2009	7	—	72	21	14	—	47	49	32	— (Note: "I'll Go Crazy If I Don't Go Crazy Tonight" did not enter the Billboard Hot 100, but peaked at number five on the Hot Singles Sales chart.)		No Line on the Horizon
"I Will Follow" (live from Glastonbury)	2011	—	—	—	—	—	—	—	—	78	—		Non-album singles
"Ordinary Love"	2013	13	88	29	27	6	—	—	11	82	84		Non-album singles
"Invisible" ((RED) edit version)	2014	24	79	44	11	41	—	—	22	65	— (Note: "Invisible" did not enter the Billboard Hot 100, but peaked at number eight on the Bubbling Under Hot 100 Singles chart.)		Non-album singles
"The Miracle (of Joey Ramone)"	2014	—	—	—	—	—	—	—	—	—	—		Songs of Innocence
"Every Breaking Wave"	2014	53	—	—	93	—	—	—	—	—	—		Songs of Innocence
"Song for Someone"	2015	87	—	—	—	— (Note: "Song for Someone" did not enter the Netherlands' Single Top 100, but peaked at number 28 on the Netherlands' Single Tip Chart.)	—	—	—	—	—		Songs of Innocence
"Red Hill Mining Town (2017 Mix)"	2017	—	—	—	—	—	—	—	—	—	— (Note: "Red Hill Mining Town (2017 Mix)" did not enter the Billboard Hot 100, but peaked at number one on the Hot Singles Sales chart.)		Non-album single
"You're the Best Thing About Me"	2017	66	83	— (Note: "You're the Best Thing About Me" did not enter the Canadian Singles Chart, but peaked at number 41 on the Canadian Digital Songs chart.)	24	— (Note: "You're the Best Thing About Me" did not enter the Netherlands' Single Top 100, but peaked at number five on the Netherlands' Single Tip Chart.)	— (Note: "You're the Best Thing About Me" did not enter the NZ Top 40 Singles Chart, but peaked at number five on the NZ Heatseekers Singles Chart.)	94	48	92	— (Note: "You're the Best Thing About Me" did not enter the Billboard Hot 100, but peaked at number 41 on the Digital Song Sales chart.)		Songs of Experience
"The Blackout"	2017	—	—	—	—	—	—	—	—	—	—		Songs of Experience
"Get Out of Your Own Way"	2017	—	—	—	89	—	—	—	73	— (Note: "Get Out of Your Own Way" did not enter the UK Singles Chart, but peaked at number 99 on the UK Singles Sales Chart.)	—		Songs of Experience
"Lights of Home"	2018	87	—	—	—	—	—	—	—	—	—		Songs of Experience
"Love Is Bigger Than Anything in Its Way"	2018	—	—	—	—	—	—	—	—	—	—		Songs of Experience
"Ahimsa" (with A. R. Rahman)	2019	—	—	—	—	—	—	—	—	—	—		Non-album single
"Your Song Saved My Life"	2021	— (Note: "Your Song Saved My Life" did not enter the Irish Singles Chart, but peaked at number four on the Irish Homegrown Top 20 chart.)	—	—	—	—	—	—	—	—	—		Sing 2 soundtrack
"Atomic City"	2023	—	—	—	—	—	—	—	—	—	—		Non-album single
"Picture of You (X+W)"	2024	—	—	—	—	—	—	—	—	—	—		How to Re-Assemble an Atomic Bomb
"Country Mile"	2024	—	—	—	—	—	—	—	—	—	—		How to Re-Assemble an Atomic Bomb
"Happiness"	2024	—	—	—	—	—	—	—	—	—	—		How to Re-Assemble an Atomic Bomb
"Song of the Future"	2026	—	—	—	—	—	—	—	—	—	—		Days of Ash
"Street of Dreams"	2026	— (Note: "Street of Dreams" did not enter the Irish Singles Chart, but peaked at number 5 on the Irish Homegrown chart.)	—	—	—	—	—	—	—	— (Note: "Silencio" did not enter the UK Singles Chart, but peaked at number 17 on the UK Singles Sales Chart.)	— (Note: "Silencio" did not enter the Billboard Hot 100, but peaked at number 32 on the Rock & Alternative Airplay chart.)		Carnaval de Luz
"Fireflies" (with Martin Garrix)	2026	—	—	—	—	— (Note: "Fireflies" did not enter the Dutch Single Top 100, but peaked at number 30 on the Dutch Single Tip chart.)	— (Note: "Fireflies" did not enter the NZ Singles Chart, but peaked at number 26 on the New Zealand Hot Singles chart.)	—	—	— (Note: "Fireflies" did not enter the UK Singles Chart, but peaked at number 21 on the UK Singles Sales Chart.)	—		Marty
"Silencio"	2026	— (Note: "Silencio" did not enter the Irish Singles Chart, but peaked at number 5 on the Irish Homegrown chart.)	—	— (Note: "Silencio" did not enter the Canadian Singles Chart, but peaked at number 18 on the Canada Mainstream Rock chart.)	—	—	—	—	—	— (Note: "Silencio" did not enter the UK Singles Chart, but peaked at number 39 on the UK Singles Sales Chart.)	— (Note: "Silencio" did not enter the Billboard Hot 100, but peaked at number 47 on the Hot Rock & Alternative Songs chart.)		Carnaval de Luz
"The Greatest Show on Earth"	2026	70	—	—	—	—	—	—	—	—	—		Carnaval de Luz
"Torn" (featuring Dolly Parton)	2026	45	—	—	—	— (Note: "Torn" did not enter the Dutch Single Top 100, but peaked at number 21 on the Dutch Single Tip chart.)	— (Note: "Torn" did not enter the NZ Singles Chart, but peaked at number 8 on the New Zealand Hot Singles chart.)	—	—	—	— (Note: "Torn" did not enter the Billboard Hot 100, but peaked at number 28 on the Country Airplay chart.)		Carnaval de Luz
"—" denotes a recording that did not chart or was not released in that territory.

== Songs as featured artist ==
Title	Year	Peak chart positions										Certifications	Album
Title	Year	IRL	CAN	CZ	FRA	NZ	POR	SK	SWE	UK	US	Certifications	Album
"XXX" (Kendrick Lamar featuring U2)	2017	22	36	78	126	31	30	46	82	50	33	ARIA: Platinum; BPI: Silver; MC: Platinum; RIAA: Gold; RMNZ: Gold	Damn

== Promotional singles and other charted songs ==
List of singles as lead artist, showing year released and album name
Title	Year	Peak chart positions										Album
Title	Year	IRL	CAN	NZ Hot	UK	US Bub.	US Main.	US Adult	US Alt.	US Dance	US Rock	Album
"Surrender"	1983	—	—	—	—	—	27	—	—	—	—	War
"40"	1983	—	—	—	—	—	—	—	—	—	—	War
"Wire"	1984	—	—	—	—	—	31	—	—	—	—	The Unforgettable Fire
"A Sort of Homecoming"	1985	—	—	—	—	—	45	—	—	—	—	The Unforgettable Fire
"The Three Sunrises"	1985	—	—	—	—	—	16	—	—	—	—	"The Unforgettable Fire" single
"Bad" (live)	1985	—	—	—	—	—	19	—	—	—	—	Wide Awake in America EP
"Bullet the Blue Sky"	1987	—	—	—	—	—	14	—	—	—	—	The Joshua Tree
"Spanish Eyes"	1987	—	—	—	—	—	11	—	—	—	—	The Joshua Tree
"God Part II"	1988	—	—	—	—	—	8	—	28	—	—	Rattle and Hum
"Jesus Christ"	1988	—	—	—	—	—	38	—	9	—	—	Folkways: A Vision Shared
"Dancing Barefoot"	1989	—	—	—	—	—	—	—	14	—	—	"When Love Comes to Town" single
"Night and Day"	1990	—	—	—	—	—	34	—	2	—	—	Red Hot + Blue
"Until the End of the World"	1992	—	69	—	—	—	5	—	4	—	—	Achtung Baby
"Zooropa"	1993	—	—	—	—	—	8	—	13	—	—	Zooropa
"In a Little While"	2000	—	—	—	—	—	—	1	—	—	—	All That You Can't Leave Behind
"The Ground Beneath Her Feet"	2000	—	—	—	—	—	—	2	20	—	—	The Million Dollar Hotel: Music from the Motion Picture
"Original of the Species"	2004	—	—	—	—	—	—	4	—	—	—	How to Dismantle an Atomic Bomb
"Instant Karma"	2007	—	—	—	—	3	—	—	—	—	—	Instant Karma: The Amnesty International Campaign to Save Darfur
"Moment of Surrender"	2009	—	—	—	—	—	—	—	—	—	—	No Line on the Horizon
"No Line on the Horizon"	2009	—	—	—	—	—	—	—	—	—	—	No Line on the Horizon
"American Soul"	2017	—	—	—	—	—	—	—	—	—	49	Songs of Experience
"Summer of Love"	2018	—	—	—	—	—	—	—	—	7	—	Songs of Experience
"Where the Streets Have No Name" (Songs of Surrender version)	2023	—	—	—	— (Note: "Where the Streets Have No Name" (Songs of Surrender version) did not enter the UK Singles Chart, but peaked at number 96 on the UK Singles Downloads Chart.)	—	—	—	—	—	—	Songs of Surrender
"Walk On (Ukraine)"	2023	— (Note: "Walk On (Ukraine)" did not enter the Irish Singles Chart, but peaked at number seven on the Irish Homegrown Top 20 chart.)	—	—	—	—	—	—	—	—	—	Songs of Surrender
"Go (Carnaval de Luz)"	2026	59	—	18	—	—	—	—	—	—	—	Carnaval de Luz
"La Reina"	2026	—	—	21	—	—	—	—	—	—	—	Carnaval de Luz
"The Mirror Maker (Rosalía)"	2026	—	—	24	—	—	—	—	—	—	—	Carnaval de Luz
"—" denotes a recording that did not chart or was not released in that territory.

== Other appearances ==
=== Studio appearances ===
Song	Year	Album	Notes
"Christmas (Baby Please Come Home)"	1987	A Very Special Christmas	recorded at a soundcheck; Darlene Love cover
"Night and Day"	1990	Red Hot + Blue	Cole Porter cover
"Until the End of the World"	1991	Until the End of the World soundtrack	Original title track to Wim Wenders' film of the same name
"Hold Me, Thrill Me, Kiss Me, Kill Me"	1995	Batman Forever soundtrack	originally recorded for Zooropa
"I'm Not Your Baby"	1997	The End of Violence soundtrack	with Sinéad O'Connor
"The Ground Beneath Her Feet" and "Stateless"	2000	The Million Dollar Hotel soundtrack	Bono also served as film's co-writer
"Beat on the Brat"	2003	We're a Happy Family: A Tribute to Ramones	Ramones cover
"Instant Karma"	2007	Instant Karma: The Amnesty International Campaign to Save Darfur	John Lennon cover

=== Live, remixes, and guest appearances ===
Song(s)	Year	Album
"October"	1982	They Call It An Accident soundtrack
"Tower of Song"	2005	Leonard Cohen: I'm Your Man
"Pride (In the Name of Love)" "City of Blinding Lights"	2009	We Are One: The Obama Inaugural Celebration at the Lincoln Memorial (DVD)
"Vertigo" "Magnificent" "Because the Night" (with Bruce Springsteen, Patti Smith and Roy Bittan) "I Still Haven't Found What I'm Looking For" (with Bruce Springsteen) "Mysterious Ways" "Where Is the Love?/One" (with The Black Eyed Peas) "Gimme Shelter" (with Mick Jagger, Fergie and will.i.am) "Stuck in a Moment That You Can't Get Out Of" (with Mick Jagger) "Beautiful Day"	2010	25th Anniversary Rock and Roll Hall of Fame Concerts
"XXX." (featured appearance on Kendrick Lamar song)	2017	Damn

== Videography ==
=== Theatrically released films ===
Title	Details
Rattle and Hum	Released: 27 October 1988; Distributor: Paramount Pictures; Format: theatrical release, VHS, LaserDisc, DVD, UMD, HD DVD, Blu-ray
U2 3D	Released: 23 January 2008; Distributor: National Geographic Entertainment; Format: 3-D theatrical release only
From the Sky Down	Released: 8 September 2011; Distributor: Universal Music Group; Format: theatrical release, DVD, Blu-ray
V-U2 An Immersive Concert Film	Released: 5 September 2024; Format: Sphere theatrical release only

=== Concert videos and video compilations ===
Title	Details	Certifications
U2 Live at Red Rocks: Under a Blood Red Sky	Released: November 1984; Label: MCA Home Video; Format: VHS, Betamax, DVD	
The Unforgettable Fire Collection	Released: 1985; Label: Island Records; Format: VHS, LaserDisc	
Achtung Baby: The Videos, the Cameos, and a Whole Lot of Interference from Zoo TV	Released: May 1992; Label: Island Records; Format: VHS, LaserDisc	MC: Gold; RIAA: Platinum
Zoo TV: Live from Sydney	Released: 17 May 1994; Label: Island Records; Format: VHS, LaserDisc, DVD	ARIA: 2× Platinum; BPI: Gold; RIAA: Platinum
PopMart: Live from Mexico City	Released: 22 November 1998; Label: Island Records; Format: VHS, DVD	ARIA: Gold; BPI: Platinum
The Best of 1980–1990	Released: April 1999; Label: Island Records; Format: VHS	BPI: Platinum
Elevation 2001: Live from Boston	Released: 26 November 2001; Label: Island Records; Format: VHS, DVD	ARIA: 2× Platinum; BPI: 2× Platinum; MC: 5× Platinum; RIAA: 2× Platinum
The Best of 1990–2000	Released: 2 December 2002; Label: Island Records; Format: VHS, DVD	BPI: Platinum
U2 Go Home: Live from Slane Castle, Ireland	Released: 17 November 2003; Label: Island Records; Format: DVD	ARIA: 7× Platinum; BPI: 2× Platinum
Vertigo 2005: Live from Chicago	Released: 14 November 2005; Label: Island Records; Format: DVD	IRMA: Platinum; ARIA: 6× Platinum; BPI: 2× Platinum
Vertigo 05: Live from Milan	Released: 17 November 2006; Label: Island Records; Format: DVD	
U218 Videos	Released: 17 November 2006; Label: Island Records; Format: DVD	
Live from Paris	Released: 20 November 2007; Label: Mercury Records; Format: DVD, digital download	
Linear	Released: 3 March 2009; Label: Interscope; Format: Digital download, DVD	
U2360° at the Rose Bowl	Released: 7 June 2010; Label: Mercury Records; Format: DVD, Blu-ray Disc	IRMA: 2× Platinum; ARIA: 3× Platinum; BPI: Gold; BVMI: 3× Gold
Innocence + Experience: Live in Paris	Released: 10 June 2016; Label: Island Records; Format: DVD, Blu-ray Disc, digital download	
eXPERIENCE + iNNOCENCE: Live in Berlin	Released: 2020; Label: Island Records; Format: DVD, streaming (both U2.com subscriber exclusives)	

=== Third-party documentaries ===
Title	Details	Certifications
Classic Albums: The Joshua Tree	Released: 21 March 2000; Label: Rhino; Format: VHS, DVD	BPI: Gold
Bono & The Edge: A Sort of Homecoming, With Dave Letterman	Released: 17 March 2023; Format: streaming (Disney+)	
Kiss the Future	Released: 21 February 2024; Format: theatrical release, streaming (Paramount+)	

=== Music videos ===
Title	Year	Album	Notes
"I Will Follow"	1980	Boy	
"Gloria"	1981	October	
"A Celebration"	1982	non-album	
"New Year's Day"	1983	War	
"Two Hearts Beat as One"	1983	War	
"Sunday Bloody Sunday" (live)	1983	Under a Blood Red Sky	
"Pride (In the Name of Love)"	1984	The Unforgettable Fire	4 videos made including Sepia version, Colour version, Slane Castle version and Faces version unreleased "Version 3"
"The Unforgettable Fire"	1984	The Unforgettable Fire	
"A Sort of Homecoming" (live)	1984	The Unforgettable Fire	
"Bad" (live)	1985	The Unforgettable Fire	
"With or Without You"	1987	The Joshua Tree	2 videos made
"I Still Haven't Found What I'm Looking For"	1987	The Joshua Tree	
"Where the Streets Have No Name"	1987	The Joshua Tree	
"Red Hill Mining Town"	1987	The Joshua Tree	Filmed in February 1987, was only released in 2007 in the bonus DVD of the 20th Anniversary reissue of The Joshua Tree.
"Spanish Eyes"	1987	non-album	
"In God's Country"	1987	The Joshua Tree	
"Christmas (Baby Please Come Home)"	1987	A Very Special Christmas	
"Desire"	1988	Rattle and Hum	2 videos made, including 1 remix
"Angel of Harlem"	1988	Rattle and Hum	
"When Love Comes to Town"	1989	Rattle and Hum	2 videos made including the Rattle and Hum version
"All I Want Is You"	1989	Rattle and Hum	
"Night and Day"	1990	Red Hot + Blue	
"The Fly"	1991	Achtung Baby	
"Mysterious Ways"	1991	Achtung Baby	
"One"	1991	Achtung Baby	4 videos made including the buffalos version with images of the band
"Even Better Than the Real Thing"	1992	Achtung Baby	3 videos made, including 1 remix
"Until the End of the World"	1992	Achtung Baby	2 videos made including 1 live
"Who's Gonna Ride Your Wild Horses"	1992	Achtung Baby	
"Love Is Blindness"	1993	Achtung Baby	
"Numb"	1993	Zooropa	2 videos made, including 1 remix
"Lemon"	1993	Zooropa	2 videos made, including 1 remix
"Stay (Faraway, So Close!)"	1993	Zooropa	
"Hold Me, Thrill Me, Kiss Me, Kill Me"	1995	Batman Forever soundtrack	
"Miss Sarajevo"	1995	Original Soundtracks 1	2 videos made
"Discothèque"	1997	Pop	3 videos made
"Staring at the Sun"	1997	Pop	2 videos made
"Last Night on Earth"	1997	Pop	
"Please"	1997	Pop	2 videos made including 1 live
"If God Will Send His Angels"	1997	Pop	
"Mofo"	1997	Pop	remix version
"Sweetest Thing"	1998	The Best of 1980–1990	
"The Ground Beneath Her Feet"	2000	The Million Dollar Hotel soundtrack	
"Beautiful Day"	2000	All That You Can't Leave Behind	2 videos made
"Stuck in a Moment You Can't Get Out Of"	2001	All That You Can't Leave Behind	3 videos made: a U.S. version, an international version and an Eze version
"Walk On"	2001	All That You Can't Leave Behind	3 videos made: a Rio version, a 9/11 version and a Liz Friedlander version
"Elevation"	2001	All That You Can't Leave Behind	
"Electrical Storm"	2002	The Best of 1990-2000	
"The Hands That Built America"	2003	Gangs of New York soundtrack	2 videos made
"Take Me to the Clouds Above"	2004	non-album	featuring LMC
"Vertigo"	2004	How to Dismantle an Atomic Bomb	3 videos made including 1 remix
"All Because of You"	2004	How to Dismantle an Atomic Bomb	
"Sometimes You Can't Make It on Your Own"	2005	How to Dismantle an Atomic Bomb	2 videos made
"City of Blinding Lights"	2005	How to Dismantle an Atomic Bomb	
"Original of the Species"	2005	How to Dismantle an Atomic Bomb	2 videos made
"One"	2006	The Breakthrough	featuring Mary J. Blige
"The Saints Are Coming"	2006	U218 Singles	featuring Green Day
"Window in the Skies"	2006	U218 Singles	3 videos made (final edit with The Beatles images included)
"The Ballad of Ronnie Drew"	2008	non-album	
"I Believe in Father Christmas"	2008	non-album	
"Get on Your Boots"	2009	No Line on the Horizon	2 videos made
"Magnificent"	2009	No Line on the Horizon	
"I'll Go Crazy If I Don't Go Crazy Tonight"	2009	No Line on the Horizon	2 videos made: one animated and one live
"Even Better Than the Real Thing"	2011	non-album	360° Remix
"Ordinary Love"	2013	non-album	2 videos made: one lyric and one remix
"Invisible"	2014	non-album	
"The Miracle (of Joey Ramone)"	2014	Songs of Innocence	
"Every Breaking Wave"	2015	Songs of Innocence	
"Song for Someone"	2015	Songs of Innocence	2 videos made
"You're the Best Thing About Me"	2017	Songs of Experience	2 videos made
"The Blackout"	2017	Songs of Experience	
"Get Out of Your Own Way"	2018	Songs of Experience	
"American Soul"	2018	Songs of Experience	
"Love Is Bigger Than Anything in Its Way"	2018	Songs of Experience	
"Your Song Saved My Life"	2021	Sing 2 Soundtrack	
"Atomic City"	2023	non-album	
"Street Of Dreams"	2026	Carnaval de Luz	
"Silencio"	2026	Carnaval de Luz	
"The Greatest Show on Earth"	2026	Carnaval de Luz	
"Can't Stop Us Now"	2026	Carnaval de Luz	
