= The Greatest Show on Earth World Tour =

Upcoming 2027 concert tour by U2

- World tour by U2
- Promotional image for the tour
- Location: Europe; North America; South America
- Associated album: Carnaval de Luz
- Start date: 23 February 2027
- End date: 9 July 2027
- Legs: 2
- No. of shows: 38
- Supporting acts: Beck; Wolf Alice

U2 concert chronology
- U2:UV Achtung Baby Live at Sphere (2023–2024); The Greatest Show on Earth World Tour (2027)

The Greatest Show on Earth World Tour (officially titled Carnaval de Luz Presents: The Greatest Show on Earth) is an upcoming worldwide concert tour by the Irish rock band U2. Planned to support their forthcoming sixteenth studio album, Carnaval de Luz (2026), the tour will feature stadium concerts in North and South America and Europe. It is set to begin on 23 February 2027 at the Estadio GNP Seguros in Mexico City, Mexico, and currently scheduled to end on 9 July at San Siro in Milan, Italy, with more concerts set to be announced.

The tour marks U2's return to stadium touring for the first time since the Joshua Tree Tour 2019, the first time touring new material in a stadium since U2 360° Tour, and the return of drummer Larry Mullen Jr. to touring with the band following his absence from their 2023–2024 Las Vegas concert residency while recovering from surgery.

The tour takes its name from "The Greatest Show on Earth", the third single from Carnaval de Luz, which was released on the same day as the tour announcement. The band has described the forthcoming production as an attempt to combine the spectacle of a stadium performance with the intimacy and connection of a smaller concert.

== Background ==
=== Previous live performances ===
U2's previous worldwide stadium tours were the Joshua Tree Tours 2017 and 2019, which commemorated the 30th anniversary of their fifth studio album, The Joshua Tree (1987). The tours attracted approximately three million attendees.

The band did not undertake another conventional concert tour for several years. Their next major live project was U2:UV Achtung Baby Live, a residency at Sphere in Paradise, Nevada, near Las Vegas, which ran from September 2023 to March 2024. The residency comprised 40 shows and focused primarily on their 1991 album Achtung Baby. U2's drummer Larry Mullen Jr. did not perform during the residency, as he was recovering from surgery to address injuries sustained over decades of performing; Dutch drummer Bram van den Berg temporarily replaced him. Mullen's planned return for the 2027 tour will restore U2's original four-member performing lineup, consisting of lead vocalist Bono, guitarist the Edge, bassist Adam Clayton, and Mullen.

=== Carnaval de Luz ===
The band released two six-track EPs, Days of Ash and Easter Lily, earlier in 2026. On 7 July, U2 released "Street of Dreams" as the lead single from their forthcoming album Carnaval de Luz, followed by "Silencio" on 24 September. The album, their first studio album of new material since Songs of Experience (2017), was formally announced in September 2026 and was released on 13 November 2026.

On 25 September 2026, U2 marked the 50th anniversary of their formation with surprise performances in Dublin, including an appearance on Grafton Street. The anniversary celebrations took place shortly before the announcement of the band's return to stadium touring.

The album's third single, "The Greatest Show on Earth", was released on 15 October. Co-written by U2 and Brian Eno, the song was accompanied by a music video directed by Anton Corbijn. Its title was subsequently used for the band's forthcoming world tour.

== Announcement ==
The Greatest Show on Earth World Tour was officially announced on 15 October 2026 by U2 and concert promoter Live Nation. The announcement confirmed the band's return to stadium performances in February 2027 and revealed six initial concerts in Mexico, Brazil, and Argentina. It included advertising with a top hat a devil horns rotating in front of a red curtain. These advertisements happened in all the cities that were going to get announced. The announcement also coincided with the release of "The Greatest Show on Earth". The band characterised the tour's title as a challenge to themselves to deliver a concert experience. In a joint statement, Bono, the Edge, Clayton, and Mullen described the planned performances as combining showmanship, colour, instrumentation, and songs drawn from the band's catalogue.

The first announced concerts were scheduled for 23 and 26 February 2027 at Estadio GNP Seguros in Mexico City, 10 and 12 March at Estádio MorumBIS in São Paulo, and 23 and 25 March at Estadio River Plate in Buenos Aires. The band confirmed that these would be the only three Latin American cities visited during 2027. Additional dates in Europe and North America were expected to be announced in the weeks following the initial announcement. U2 also confirmed that plans were being developed for performances in Ireland, although no Irish concert dates or venues had been announced as of October 2026.

The announcement attracted coverage from international music publications including Rolling Stone, NME, MusicRadar, and Louder, which highlighted the band's return to stadium touring and the restoration of their original performing line-up.

== Development and production ==
The tour is planned as a stadium production supporting Carnaval de Luz. According to the band's official announcement, the concerts are intended to combine the scale of large stadium performances with a sense of intimacy and connection between U2 and their audiences. It will mark Mullen's return to major live performances with U2 following his absence from the band's Las Vegas residency. Mullen had undergone surgery to address injuries that affected his ability to perform, and the 2027 concerts were announced with the original line-up restored.

On November 11, during an iHeartRadio event that was live-streamed on TikTok, the band members did a Q&A where at one point, Bono unveiled some concept art and renders for their upcoming tour's stage, featuring a massive real red curtain, with a catwalk that leads to a B-stage, and the words "Carnaval de Luz" backwards at the top of the stage, to create the effect that the audience is inside the carnival. The B-stage will have a huge mirror that comes from the actual stage. Bono joked, "We can't tell you what's going on behind the curtain because then we would have to kill you".

== Planning, itinerary, and ticketing ==
=== Latin America ===
The initial itinerary comprises six concerts in three Latin American countries. The tour is scheduled to begin with two performances at Estadio GNP Seguros in Mexico City on 23 and 26 February 2027. The band will then travel to Brazil for concerts on 10 and 12 March at Estádio MorumBIS in São Paulo. These performances will mark U2's first concerts in Brazil since their 2017 appearances during the Joshua Tree Tour, ending an absence of nearly ten years. The first announced leg will conclude with two performances at Estadio River Plate in Buenos Aires on 23 and 25 March 2027. Beck was announced as the opening act for all six Latin American concerts.

On 21 October, a third show in Mexico City was announced for 28 February. The following day, a third show in São Paulo was added for 14 March. A day later, a fourth show in Mexico City was announced for 2 March. On 27 October, it was announced that there would be a fourth show in São Paulo on 16 March and a third show in Buenos Aires on 27 March. U2's official announcement stated that Mexico City, São Paulo, and Buenos Aires would be the only Latin American cities visited during the tour in 2027.

=== Europe ===
While the first announcement didn't include concerts in Europe, the band stated that details would be announced in the following weeks. Promo started on 26 October with the same promotional run from South American cities, and additional lyrics from "Silencio" and "Sunday Bloody Sunday". Two days later, the band posted a teaser on Instagram that with lyrics from "Grace", "The Fly", "Desire", "The Greatest Show on Earth", "Tears of Things" and "La Reina". The shows were announced on 29 October.

The initial itinerary comprises twelve concerts in seven countries, with the leg scheduled to begin with two performances at the Strawberry Arena in Stockholm on 26 and 28 April 2027. The Spain shows for Barcelona and Seville were announced on 5 November as there was a train derailment before the original announcement which pushed the announcement for these shows back. 2 shows in Barcelona were announced and 1 show in Seville were in the original announcement.

On 4 November, a third show in London was announced for 22 June. On 5 November, a third show in Paris was announced for 5 May, a second show in Lisbon for 28 May, a third show in Amsterdam for 9 June, a fourth show in London for 25 June, and a second show in Berlin for 1 July. The following day on 6 November, a third show in Stockholm was announced for 30 April, a fourth show in Amsterdam for 11 June, and a third show in Milan for 9 July. On 12 November, a second show in Seville was announced for 24 May and a third show in Barcelona for 17 May.

=== North America ===
At the time of the initial tour announcement, U2 confirmed that additional dates in North America were planned for 2027. The band stated that details would be announced in the following weeks, although no specific venues or concert dates were provided at the time. It is expected that the North American leg of the tour will be announced in late November 2026, more specifically possibly around the time of the National Football League Green Bay Packers vs. Los Angeles Rams Thanksgiving Halftime Show game.

=== Ticket sales ===
Ticket presales for the six initially announced concerts began on 19 October 2026 for eligible U2.com subscribers. The presale was divided into two groups: Feedback and The Hype. Feedback subscribers received access beginning at 10 a.m. local time on 19 October, while The Hype subscribers received access beginning at 10 a.m. local time on 20 October. Both presale periods were scheduled to end at 10 p.m. local time on 21 October.

Subscribers were issued individual presale codes to access ticket purchases. New subscribers were assigned to The Hype group, while existing eligible subscribers could access the earlier Feedback presale.

For the Mexico City concerts, a separate Ticketmaster Artist Presale was scheduled for 22 October. Registration for the sale closed on 18 October. General ticket sales were scheduled to begin on 23 October at 10 a.m. local time.

For the São Paulo and Buenos Aires concerts, general ticket sales were scheduled to begin on 22 October at 10 a.m. local time.

Tickets for the concerts were distributed through Ticketmaster and its regional platforms, with additional local presale arrangements available in certain markets.

=== Ticket pricing and charitable initiatives ===
For the Brazilian concerts, ticket prices ranged from R$345 for concession-priced grandstand admission to R$3,000 for premium (RED) Zone packages. Standard grandstand tickets were priced from R$690. The packages offered premium standing areas and additional benefits.

The tour continued U2's association with (RED), the charitable initiative co-founded by Bono and Bobby Shriver to support efforts against AIDS. A portion of proceeds from (RED) Zone ticket packages was designated to support the organization.

For the São Paulo concerts, Santander customers were offered additional ticketing benefits, including dedicated presale arrangements and instalment payment options. Purchases were subject to ticket limits established by the local promoter.

== Tour dates ==
List of 2027 concerts
Date	City	Country	Venue	Opening act	Attendance	Revenue
23 February	Mexico City	Mexico	Estadio GNP Seguros	Beck	—	—
26 February	Mexico City	Mexico	Estadio GNP Seguros	Beck	—	—
28 February	Mexico City	Mexico	Estadio GNP Seguros	Beck	—	—
2 March	Mexico City	Mexico	Estadio GNP Seguros	Beck	—	—
10 March	São Paulo	Brazil	Estádio MorumBIS	Beck	—	—
12 March	São Paulo	Brazil	Estádio MorumBIS	Beck	—	—
14 March	São Paulo	Brazil	Estádio MorumBIS	Beck	—	—
16 March	São Paulo	Brazil	Estádio MorumBIS	Beck	—	—
23 March	Buenos Aires	Argentina	Estadio Monumental	Beck	—	—
25 March	Buenos Aires	Argentina	Estadio Monumental	Beck	—	—
27 March	Buenos Aires	Argentina	Estadio Monumental	Beck	—	—
29 March	Buenos Aires	Argentina	Estadio Monumental	Beck	—	—
26 April	Stockholm	Sweden	Strawberry Arena	Wolf Alice	—	—
28 April	Stockholm	Sweden	Strawberry Arena	Wolf Alice	—	—
30 April	Stockholm	Sweden	Strawberry Arena	Wolf Alice	—	—
5 May	Paris	France	Stade de France	Wolf Alice	—	—
8 May	Paris	France	Stade de France	Wolf Alice	—	—
9 May	Paris	France	Stade de France	Wolf Alice	—	—
13 May	Barcelona	Spain	Estadi Olímpic Lluís Companys	Wolf Alice	—	—
15 May	Barcelona	Spain	Estadi Olímpic Lluís Companys	Wolf Alice	—	—
17 May	Barcelona	Spain	Estadi Olímpic Lluís Companys	Wolf Alice	—	—
22 May	Seville	Spain	Estadio de La Cartuja	Wolf Alice	—	—
24 May	Seville	Spain	Estadio de La Cartuja	Wolf Alice	—	—
27 May	Lisbon	Portugal	Estádio da Luz	Wolf Alice	—	—
28 May	Lisbon	Portugal	Estádio da Luz	Wolf Alice	—	—
5 June	Amsterdam	Netherlands	Johan Cruyff Arena	Wolf Alice	—	—
6 June	Amsterdam	Netherlands	Johan Cruyff Arena	Wolf Alice	—	—
9 June	Amsterdam	Netherlands	Johan Cruyff Arena	Wolf Alice	—	—
11 June	Amsterdam	Netherlands	Johan Cruyff Arena	Wolf Alice	—	—
18 June	London	England	Tottenham Hotspur Stadium	Wolf Alice	—	—
19 June	London	England	Tottenham Hotspur Stadium	Wolf Alice	—	—
22 June	London	England	Tottenham Hotspur Stadium	Wolf Alice	—	—
25 June	London	England	Tottenham Hotspur Stadium	Wolf Alice	—	—
30 June	Berlin	Germany	Olympiastadion	Wolf Alice	—	—
1 July	Berlin	Germany	Olympiastadion	Wolf Alice	—	—
5 July	Milan	Italy	Stadio San Siro	Wolf Alice	—	—
6 July	Milan	Italy	Stadio San Siro	Wolf Alice	—	—
9 July	Milan	Italy	Stadio San Siro	Wolf Alice	—	—

== Personnel ==
U2

- Bono – vocals
- The Edge – guitar, vocals
- Adam Clayton – bass guitar
- Larry Mullen Jr. – drums, percussion
