= The Greatest Show on Earth (song) =

Single by U2

from the album Carnaval de Luz
- Released: 15 October 2026
- Length: 5:34
- Label: Island
- Composer: U2, Brian Eno
- Lyricist: Bono
- Producer: Jacknife Lee

U2 singles chronology
"Silencio" (2026)	"The Greatest Show on Earth" (2026)	"Torn" (2026)

"The Greatest Show on Earth" is a song by the Irish rock band U2. It is the eighth track from their sixteenth studio album, Carnaval de Luz, and was released as its third single on 15 October 2026 through Island Records. The song was written by U2 and Brian Eno and produced by Jacknife Lee.

The single's release coincided with the announcement of the Greatest Show on Earth World Tour, which takes its name from the song. An accompanying music video, directed by the band's longtime collaborator Anton Corbijn, was filmed in the Californian desert and depicts the band as members of a fictional religious cult.

The song received positive reviews from several music publications, with critics highlighting its expansive arrangement, the Edge's guitar playing and its resemblance to U2's earlier anthemic material.

== Background ==
U2 announced their sixteenth studio album, Carnaval de Luz, on 24 September 2026, coinciding with the release of its second single, "Silencio". Scheduled for release on 13 November, the album is the band's first studio album of new material since Songs of Experience (2017). The album was recorded during an extended period of creative activity that also produced the six-track EPs Days of Ash and Easter Lily, both released earlier in 2026.

The album's first single, "Street of Dreams", was released on 7 July 2026, followed by "Silencio" on 24 September. "The Greatest Show on Earth" was released as the third single on 15 October, less than a month before the album's scheduled release.

"The Greatest Show on Earth" was co-written by U2 and their longtime collaborator Brian Eno, who contributed synthesizers and keyboards to the recording. Eno also contributed to two other songs on Carnaval de Luz, "Go (Carnaval de Luz)" and "Can't Stop Us Now". The album was produced by Jacknife Lee, who had previously worked with the band on several projects.

In an interview with Rolling Stone preceding the single's release, Bono identified "The Greatest Show on Earth" as his favourite song from Carnaval de Luz, describing it as potentially the band's strongest composition in several years. He stated that the song had been a significant reason for his continued enthusiasm about U2. Bono also discussed difficulties completing the song's lyrics. According to U2Songs's account of the interview, he found inspiration after watching Baz Luhrmann's EPiC: Elvis Presley in Concert (2025), which helped him develop the song's central phrase about having once been the greatest show on Earth.

== Recording ==
"The Greatest Show on Earth" was produced by Jacknife Lee and features contributions from Brian Eno and guitarist Leo Abrahams. Eno performed synthesisers and keyboards, while Abrahams contributed additional guitar. Lee provided programming and keyboards in addition to his production work.

The recording was engineered by Duncan Stewart, mixed by Steve Lillywhite, with CJ Eiriksson serving as second mixing engineer, and mastered by John Webber.

An alternate recording of "The Greatest Show on Earth" was reportedly made with Daniel Lanois and the San Francisco Symphony. Photographs identified by U2Songs as originating from a recording session showed members of U2, excluding Adam Clayton, with Lanois and the orchestra on a soundstage. U2Songs reported that this appeared to be an alternate version rather than the recording released as the single. As of October 2026, the alternate version had not been commercially released.

== Composition ==
"The Greatest Show on Earth" is a rock song lasting five minutes and 34 seconds. Written by U2 and Brian Eno, the recording features Bono on lead vocals, the Edge on guitar and backing vocals, Adam Clayton on bass guitar, and Larry Mullen Jr. on drums. Its arrangement also incorporates synthesizers, keyboards, programming and additional guitar.

The song explores the deterioration of a romantic relationship and the difficulties of maintaining love, trust and religious faith. U2 described it as a story about lovers struggling to preserve their faith in one another and in faith itself. The lyrics employ theatrical imagery to represent the relationship, presenting love as a performance that has gradually lost its former intensity.

Rolling Stone characterised the composition as an expansive, slow-building song concerning a broken relationship, also identifying references to Christian nationalism within its lyrics. The song's religious imagery addresses the relationship between love and fear, while its theatrical metaphors contrast the public spectacle of performance with private emotional difficulties.

The song opens with a comparatively restrained arrangement before developing into a more expansive rock composition. Writing for NME, Tom Skinner described it as an epic track, highlighting the Edge's prominent guitar work.

Andrew Korpan of ClutchPoints described the opening guitar notes as eerie and compared the song's musical approach to U2's earlier material. He also drew parallels with "Sometimes You Can't Make It on Your Own" from How to Dismantle an Atomic Bomb (2004), noting similarities in their emotional tone and expansive arrangements.

Emma Platt of Ratings Game Music described the arrangement as beginning quietly before building progressively towards an emotional climax. She praised its construction and the recognisable sound of the band's instrumentation and vocals.

In the official announcement of Carnaval de Luz, Universal Music identified "The Greatest Show on Earth", "Glorify" and "Midnight Sunshine" as examples of the album's more structured songwriting, contrasting them with the experimental material and the surf-punk influences of "Silencio".

== Release ==
"The Greatest Show on Earth" was released on 15 October 2026 through Island Records as the third single from Carnaval de Luz. The release was coordinated with the announcement of U2's 2027 world tour, which shares its name with the song.

The song was released internationally through digital download and streaming services. According to U2Songs, the track appeared as a standalone single on most digital platforms, while Apple Music and Amazon Music presented it as part of the forthcoming album. The release used the artwork for Carnaval de Luz rather than a separate single cover.

The digital release was made available in standard audio quality, high-resolution audio at 48 kHz and 24-bit, and Dolby Atmos. The single contains the album version of the song, with no additional tracks listed on its standard digital release.

=== Promotion ===
Footage subsequently used in the music video first appeared publicly on 18 September 2026 in a retrospective video shared by U2 on social media to commemorate the band's approaching 50th anniversary. The retrospective, titled "1976–2026 ∞", combined footage from throughout U2's career with music from "I Will Follow" and "Silencio". It also incorporated footage from the "The Greatest Show on Earth" video shoot, including some colour sequences not used in the predominantly black-and-white final video.

On 14 October, the day before the single's release, U2 published promotional excerpts of the video through their social media channels. According to U2Songs, two different teasers appeared, including a longer excerpt containing vocals and a shorter version without them. The longer version was temporarily removed before being reposted later.

The full single and accompanying music video were released on 15 October. The song was also used in promotional trailers for the band's forthcoming world tour.

=== World tour announcement ===
The release coincided with the announcement of Carnaval de Luz Presents: The Greatest Show on Earth, a world tour scheduled to begin on 23 February 2027 at Estadio GNP Seguros in Mexico City. The initial announcement included six stadium concerts in Mexico, Brazil and Argentina, with American musician Beck announced as the supporting act.

The first concerts were announced for 23 and 26 February in Mexico City, 10 and 12 March in São Paulo, and 23 and 25 March in Buenos Aires. Additional dates in Europe and North America were expected to be announced subsequently.

The tour marks the band's return to stadium performances following the conclusion of the Joshua Tree Tour 2017 in December 2019. It also marks drummer Larry Mullen Jr.'s return to touring with the band after a neck injury prevented him from participating in their 2023–2024 Las Vegas residency.

The announcement was also covered by Louder, which reported on the band's plans to return to stadium touring and the connection between the song and the forthcoming concert production.

== Music video ==
The music video for "The Greatest Show on Earth" was directed by Dutch photographer and filmmaker Anton Corbijn, a longtime collaborator of U2. Filming took place on 28 May 2026 at Cougar Buttes in the Californian desert. The video was released on 15 October 2026, simultaneously with the single.

The predominantly black-and-white video depicts the members of U2 as figures in a fictional religious cult. The band members appear wearing masks, while women perform much of the community's physical labour. According to the band's official description, the video satirises the group's portrayal as religious authorities and the unequal distribution of labour within the fictional community.

The video reflects the song's themes of faith, devotion and the tension between outward appearances and private relationships. Daniel Kreps of Rolling Stone noted that the video develops the religious themes present in Bono's lyrics.

The production was handled by Merman, with Megan Gutman serving as producer and Phedon Papamichael as cinematographer. Pele Kudren was credited as production designer. James Rose edited the video through Square Peg Edit, and Yoomin Lee handled colour grading at Company Three.

According to U2Songs, the Californian filming sessions also included material for a music video for "Can't Stop Us Now", another track from Carnaval de Luz. The desert shoot followed the band's earlier video production sessions in Mexico City for "Street of Dreams" and "Silencio".

== Critical reception ==
"The Greatest Show on Earth" received positive reviews from several music publications, with critics praising its arrangement, musicianship and resemblance to U2's earlier work.

Writing for Uncut, Andrew Mueller called the song "unabashed Joshua Tree U2, The Edge's ringing guitar evoking a windswept desertscape into which some craggy sage might well descend bearing stone tablets". Mueller called it a "highlight not just of this album, but the entire U2 songbook". Tom Skinner of NME characterised the song as an epic composition and praised the Edge's prominent guitar work. Skinner also highlighted the song's lyrical themes of love, faith and the deterioration of a relationship, describing the recording as an expansive preview of Carnaval de Luz. In Rolling Stone, Daniel Kreps discussed the song's significance to the band, particularly Bono's identification of it as his favourite track from the forthcoming album. Kreps also examined the relationship between its lyrical themes and the religious imagery used in the accompanying music video. Kevin Harley of Record Collector called the song a standout track from the album and described it as: "reflective and wistful, meditating on a life lived at the heart of a travelling spectacle – stained-glass cinema metaphors feature – and on what meaning, spiritual or otherwise, might be gleaned from that calling. As the Edge's guitar flickers behind Bono's warm vocal, its concert-ready glow feels earned."

== Credits and personnel ==
Credits are adapted from U2Songs, which reproduces the recording's liner-note information.

U2

- Bono – lead vocals
- The Edge – guitar, vocals
- Adam Clayton – bass guitar
- Larry Mullen Jr. – drums

Additional musicians

- Brian Eno – synthesizers, keyboards, songwriting
- Leo Abrahams – additional guitar
- Jacknife Lee – programming, keyboards

Technical

- Jacknife Lee – production
- Duncan Stewart – recording engineering
- Steve Lillywhite – mixing
- CJ Eiriksson – second mixing engineer
- John Webber – mastering

== Charts ==
Chart (2026)	Peak position
Ireland (IRMA)	70
UK Singles Downloads (OCC)	26
UK Singles Sales (OCC)	33
