= This Dream of You (song) =

Single by Martin Garrix
- Released: 2 October 2026
- Genre: Dance; progressive house
- Length: 4:46
- Label: Stmpd; Darkroom
- Composer: Martijn Garritsen
- Lyricists: Garritsen; Shaun Farrugia; Simon Carmody; Tudor Davies; Darren Flynn
- Producer: Martin Garrix

Martin Garrix singles chronology
"Fireflies" (2026)	"This Dream of You" (2026)

"This Dream of You" is a song written and produced by Dutch DJ Martin Garrix. Premiered at Tomorrowland as the introduction of Garrix's main stage DJ set on 17 July 2026, it was released as a single by Stmpd Rcrds and Darkroom Records on 2 October 2026.

The track marks the second time Garrix has performed as a sole lead vocalist on his own release, following his vocal debut on "Catharina" and supporting vocal appearances on "Angels for Each Other" and "Weightless". It is slated to appear on his upcoming second studio album.

== Background ==
On 17 July 2026, Garrix premiered an early version of "This Dream of You" during his mainstage set on the first weekend of the Tomorrowland music festival.

On 24 September 2026, Garrix played the song in full during his last resident show of the year at Ushuaïa Ibiza.

On 29 September 2026, Garrix posted two videos teasing the track to Instagram. The first is a clip of him playing the song during his Tomorrowland set, while the second shows him singing an acoustic version of the song while playing the guitar. Garrix wrote in the caption: "Singing is very far out of my comfort zone, but I'm excited to try new things and grow/learn!! Premiered it at Tomorrowland as my intro and so happy to finally share it with you guys. Big hug." In the same post, he also revealed that the song would be released on 2 October.

In a press release, Garrix noted that the song is really special to him, adding: "Singing is very far outside of my comfort zone, but I've been wanting to push myself, try new things and keep learning. I first played the track as my intro at Tomorrowland, which made that moment even more personal. Having my own voice at the center of one of my productions is something I never thought I'd do, so this release means a lot to me."

== Composition ==
"This Dream of You" is a dance and progressive house song. It opens with "an orchestral, ethereal symphony" and "a gentle acoustic guitar progression", which is followed by "light, airy textures and euphoric melodies" that "build an expansive atmosphere", leading to "a sweeping, synth-soaked drop". Lyrically, the song focuses on finding hope in another person when everything else feels uncertain.

== Credits and personnel ==
Credits are adapted from Tidal.

- Martin Garrix – composition, lyrics, production, executive production, vocal production, vocals, background vocals, guitar, mixing, mastering
- Shaun Farrugia – lyrics, background vocals, piano
- Peppe Folliero – mastering, mixing
- Glenn Gaddum jr. – bass
- Simon Carmody – lyrics
- Tudor Davies – lyrics, vocal production
- Darren Flynn – lyrics
- Mark Otten – guitar
- Frank van Essen – string ensemble
- Josh Connolly – vocal production

== Charts ==
Chart performance for "This Dream of You"
Chart (2026)	Peak position
Croatia International Airplay (Top lista)	89
Latvia Airplay (LaIPA)	5
Netherlands (Single Tip)	27
US Hot Dance/Electronic Songs (Billboard)	24
