= Carnaval de Luz =

Studio album by U2
- Released: 13 November 2026
- Recorded: 2024–2026
- Studios: Neptune; Chaplin; The Hot Purple Petting Zoo
- Genres: Rock; pop
- Length: 47:26
- Label: Island
- Producer: Jacknife Lee

U2 chronology
Easter Lily (2026)	Carnaval de Luz (2026)

Singles from Carnaval de Luz
- 1. "Street of Dreams" Released: 7 July 2026; 2. "Silencio" Released: 24 September 2026; 3. "The Greatest Show on Earth" Released: 15 October 2026; 4. "Torn" Released: 13 November 2026

Carnaval de Luz (Spanish and Portuguese for "Carnival of Light") is the sixteenth studio album by the Irish rock band U2. It was produced by Jacknife Lee, and was released on 13 November 2026 through Island Records. It was the band's first album of new original material since Songs of Experience in 2017. Carnaval de Luz was their third release of new songs of 2026, following the EPs Days of Ash and Easter Lily in February and April, respectively.

The album was supported with the release of four singles: "Street of Dreams", "Silencio", "The Greatest Show on Earth", and "Torn". The latter song features the last recording of American singer-songwriter Dolly Parton, who died earlier that August. The album received positive reviews from critics, many of whom praised the album's optimistic tone and believed that the band sounded rejuvenated compared to their previous records. U2 will support the album with the Greatest Show on Earth World Tour in 2027.

== Background and recording ==
The development of Carnaval de Luz and its companion EPs Days of Ash and Easter Lily took shape around a liturgical calendar structure. Released in early 2026, the EPs captured the reflective periods of Ash Wednesday and Lent, while the album followed in November as a joyful celebration of life.

Reflecting on the project's background, the band members highlighted a renewed focus on their core identity and internal chemistry. Bassist Adam Clayton stated that the aim was to create freeing and joyful music as a counterpoint to an era of gloom, while noting that societal freedoms won since the 1960s were gradually being challenged. Drummer Larry Mullen Jr. observed that the group embraced their status as "outliers", emphasizing the enduring value of the band in its original form. Guitarist the Edge described approaching the music from the perspective of an audience member seeking mystery, melody, and surprise, and remarked that in difficult times rock'n'roll could function as a form of repair. Vocalist Bono characterized hope as a duty, noting that words and daily actions shape the semantic environment.

Preliminary work on the album began around 2023 during the band's residency at Sphere in the Las Vegas Valley. After each show, the venue's PA system played a version of the song "Glorify" with vocals by the American singer Brittany Howard of Alabama Shakes. Producer Jacknife Lee recalled that early sessions involved listening to demos and evaluating ideas: "It was all very vague and we were just starting. It was uncertain as to whether Mullen would be able to play all these things." Mullen had missed the Sphere shows due to required surgery, which initially raised concerns about his return.

The band also spent a week working with Brian Eno at a studio in Enniskerry, Ireland, initially exploring material with thoughts of a second "Passengers" album. Ultimately, they took three of those ideas and moved them over to the new U2 record. Among them was "The Greatest Show on Earth", which began under the working title "Cathedral" during the Eno sessions before being shaped into a finished song. Reflecting on Eno's approach to their creative process, Bono noted that "Brian Eno prefers when U2 stop making sense."

Following successful surgery, Mullen rejoined the group in the autumn of 2024 on the French Riviera. Describing Mullen's return, Lee noted: "Larry playing for the first time after the operation was a huge moment... Something was different. Larry's changed the way he plays. It's far more nuanced. He's hitting lighter." Backing tracks developed during these sessions and subsequent work formed the basis for final takes like "Street of Dreams" and "The Mirror Maker (Rosalía)".

During the writing sessions in the south of France, the band also collaborated with DJ and producer Martin Garrix. Following their initial work on "We Are the People" for UEFA Euro 2020, Garrix's creative involvement with Bono and the Edge expanded into the broader project, contributing to tracks across the release cycle—including the Garrix single "Fireflies" (featuring Bono and the Edge) and "Scars" (featured on the Easter Lily EP), as well as co-writing the track "Glorify" for Carnaval de Luz. Garrix noted that what began as rough demo voice notes evolved through organic sessions where the band "elevated everything".

In September 2025, the band set up a makeshift studio in a run-down Dublin house slated for demolition, followed by intensive sessions in January and February 2026. Lee described the stripped-down environment: "A lot of times there were not even engineers, it was just the four of them and me. Very little gear and very few people, just as it would have been when they first started." Many compositions originated without words through vocal improvisations ("mumbling, bumbling vowels and consonants") before taking final shape.

The album's closing track featuring Dolly Parton arrived late in the process. Before her death in August 2026, Parton had contributed an early version of the song "Torn", giving the band complete creative freedom with the words, "you can take it anywhere you like and I might like it there too". What began as a country song about a nation tearing itself apart evolved into a reflection on division and conflict akin to an "uncivil war fought at the kitchen table" a theme that Bono connected not only to American family gatherings, but also to his own upbringing in Dublin arguing with his brother and father at Christmas. The track also features longtime collaborator Daniel Lanois on pedal steel.

== Compositon ==
Carnaval de Luz is primarily a rock and pop album.

== Release ==
U2 released Carnaval de Luz's lead single, "Street of Dreams", on 7 July 2026. Details about the album were unconfirmed until 24 September, when the group officially announced it and released the second single, "Silencio". The following day, the band commemorated the 50th anniversary of their first practice with performances at their alma mater Mount Temple Comprehensive School and from the balcony of Bewley's Cafe on Grafton Street. During the Mount Temple show, they were accompanied by 32 student musicians for a performance of "One". On 15 October, the group announced the Greatest Show on Earth World Tour for 2027 and released "The Greatest Show on Earth" as the third single from the album.

Carnaval de Luz was released on 13 November 2026. Deluxe CD and LP editions include physical copies of the preceding EPs Days of Ash and Easter Lily. The same day, Island Records issued several versions of "Torn", a duet with Dolly Parton; accompanying the album version were a country version co-produced by Kent Wells as well as a T Bone Burnett take. The following day, U2 opened the 2026 Rock and Roll Hall of Fame induction ceremony at the Peacock Theater in Los Angeles with a surprise performance, playing "Silencio" and "Pride (In the Name of Love)".

A music video for "Can't Stop Us Now", directed by Anton Corbijn, was released on 16 November.

To promote the record, U2 performed a concert at Tate Modern for BBC Music on 3 November that paid tribute to Brian Eno and featured performances of songs on which he collaborated with the band. The performance will air later in the month on BBC Two, BBC Radio 2, and BBC Sounds.

Independent record stores around the world hosted listening sessions of the album for fans the day before its release.

The album's title and artwork have been noted for their similarity to the Beatles' unreleased experimental piece "Carnival of Light" (1967) and the sleeve of Abbey Road (1969) respectively, whilst the cover has also been compared to that of Echo & the Bunnymen's Heaven Up Here (1981).

== Reception ==
Professional ratings
Aggregate scores
Source	Rating
Metacritic	76/100
Review scores
Source	Rating
AllMusic	4/5 stars
The Guardian	4/5 stars
The Irish Times	4/5 stars
Mojo	4/5 stars
NME	3/5 stars
Pitchfork	6.5/10
Record Collector	4/5 stars
Rolling Stone	4.5/5 stars
The Telegraph	4/5 stars
Uncut	8/10

Carnaval de Luz was well received by music critics, earning a weighted average score of 76 out of 100 on the review aggregator Metacritic, based on 17 reviews. Several critics have described Carnaval de Luz as the band's best album in decades. Most assessments of the album have been positive, aside from a negative review published by Paste.

Dave Simpson of The Guardian said that the band "sound rejuvenated" with Mullen back and that although the lyrics had the "usual bagful of trademark earnest Bono-isms", the music was "so epically impassioned and elevating that... it might not change the world, but it can certainly uplift anyone listening to it". Simpson thought that despite some of his favorite songs from the companion EPs not appearing on the album, it was "some of the band's best work in more than 30 years". Brian Hiatt of Rolling Stone similarly judged that the band seemed refreshed, saying, "Each song is tight and punchy, memorable and melodic", while praising the simplicity of the production for making the songs feel cohesive. He called the album an "ambitious endeavor" and said that it stood as "an alternative argument to pop-culture doomsaying". Neil McCormick of The Telegraph described the release as "shiny, poppy, artful and heartfelt, full of hope and optimism" with songs that were "full of rhythmic bounce and melodic swagger". He believed that the record had a "lightness of spirit that might be surprising coming from U2". Victoria Segal of Mojo called the album "a wind-tunnel rush of colour and sound, a concerted attempt to work against the enveloping misery engendered by the current state of the world." Noting "occasional platitudinous lapses", she praised the band's return to "full strength" with Mullen active again, and she concluded "Fifty years since they came together in the schoolyard, U2 still throw one hell of a parade." Writing for Uncut, Andrew Mueller said the band were "back in readily recognisable form" and that the album "Lyrically and spiritually... is also recognisable as another chapter in U2's manifesto of dogged optimism". Mueller described "The Greatest Show on Earth" as a "highlight not just of this album, but the entire U2 songbook".

Kevin Harley of Record Collector stated that if the album "can seem characteristically guilty of trying too hard to be all things to all modern U2 fans, not least with its phalanx of collaborators... it also serves a flawed but fervent and full-bodied contrasting partner-piece to its sibling EPs." Harley concluded that the band "sound ambitious and engaged in their 50th year, swinging for the fences and hitting more targets than not." Will Hodgkinson of The Times gave the album three out of five stars, writing that while it occasionally descends into "Coldplay-like levels of Panglossian positivity", its central message—that "happiness is an act of resistance"—is welcome. He highlighted "The Greatest Show on Earth" and the duet "Torn" as standouts, while criticising tracks such as "Street of Dreams" and "The Mirror Maker (Rosalía)". Ed Power of The Irish Times said, "It's hard to recall a moment since the turn of the century when U2 have sounded so invigorated, so unburdened and so over themselves." He called Carnaval de Luz "easily their best" album since How to Dismantle an Atomic Bomb (2004) and highlighted "The Greatest Show on Earth" as the album's bittersweet "centrepiece".

Sam Sodomsky of Pitchfork wrote that Carnaval de Luz "rides on the back of these hard lessons and pushes forward, with a lighter heart and unlikely grace," highlighting how the thinned-out sound allows each band member to take the spotlight. However, Sodomsky noted that the record "loses some momentum" around the mid-album tracks like "If the World Is at War We Better Not Be", pointing out that some of their trademark grand ambitions "still seems beyond their grasp." Joe Goggins of NME noted that while Bono had not moved past his "penchant for lyrical grandiosity", the band sounded "more playful than preachy for the first time in a long time". He praised the album's "stirring nods" to The Joshua Tree and Achtung Baby highlighting the Edge's soaring guitars on the "outstanding" "The Greatest Show on Earth"—as well as its disarmingly simple, melody-driven pop tracks like "Superficiality" and "Midnight Sunshine", concluding that subtlety "suits them". Neil Z. Yeung of AllMusic wrote that after their uneven 2010s output, U2 sounded "reinvigorated and, for the first time in a while, free of whatever existential burdens that had stolen their groove for the decade prior". He described the album as "vibrant and varied", and thought that the group delivered "one of their most fun and engaging albums" and "a celebratory injection of positive vibes to both the world and this band".

== Commercial performance ==
Carnaval de Luz debuted at number one on the UK Albums Chart, outselling the other entries in the top five combined; it was U2's 12th number-one album in the UK, tying them with Bruce Springsteen. In its opening week in the UK, the album totaled 42,512 consumption units, comprising 38,064 sales of physical copies, 2,317 digital downloads, and 2,132 sales-equivalent streams.

Carnaval de Luz debuted at number one on the Irish Albums Chart, giving the group their 11th number-one album in their native country.

== Track listing ==
All lyrics are written by Bono, except where noted; all music is composed by U2, except where noted.

No.	Title	Lyrics	Music	Length
1.	"Go (Carnaval de Luz)"	Bono; The Edge	U2; Brian Eno	2:23
2.	"La Reina"	Bono; The Edge		4:32
3.	"Street of Dreams"	Bono; The Edge		3:54
4.	"The Mirror Maker (Rosalía)"	Bono; The Edge		4:30
5.	"Superficiality"			3:40
6.	"If the World Is at War We Better Not Be"			2:33
7.	"Silencio"			2:35
8.	"The Greatest Show on Earth"		U2; Eno	5:34
9.	"Glorify"	Bono; Simon Carmody	U2; Martijn Garritsen; John Martin Lindstrom; Michel Zitron	3:38
10.	"Midnight Sunshine"			3:43
11.	"Can't Stop Us Now"		U2; Eno	5:49
12.	"Torn" (featuring Dolly Parton)	Dolly Parton; Bono; Johnny McDaid	Parton; U2; McDaid	4:31

iTunes Store bonus track
No.	Title	Length
13.	"Get Back to Now"	3:49

== Personnel ==
Adapted from album liner notes.

U2

- Bono – vocals, keyboards (track 6)
- The Edge – guitar, vocals, keyboards
- Adam Clayton – bass guitar
- Larry Mullen Jr. – drums, percussion

Additional musicians

- Brian Eno – keyboards (tracks 1, 8, 11)
- Jacknife Lee – keyboards (1−8, 10−12), guitar (1, 3, 5, 9−12), programming (1−6, 8−12), vocals (2−3, 9−10)
- Leo Abrahams – additional guitar (8, 11)
- Michel Zitron – piano (9)
- Dolly Parton – vocals (12)
- Daniel Lanois – pedal steel (12)

Technical

- Jacknife Lee – production, mixing (1−2, 4, 6, 12)
- Shawn Everett – mixing (2)
- Duncan Stewart – engineering
- Tom Elmhirst – mixing (3)
- Neal H Pogue – mixing (5, 9−11)
- Zachary Acosta – mix assistance (5, 9−11)
- Ryan Tedder – additional production (7)
- Steve Lillywhite – mixing (7−8)
- CJ Eiriksson – mix engineering (7−8)
- Kent Wells – vocal production for Dolly Parton (12)
- Joel McKenney – vocal engineering for Dolly Parton (12)
- Math Bishop – mix assistance
- Ognen Dinevski – mix assistance
- Caroline Whitaker – mix assistance
- Jack Mello – mix assistance
- John Webber – mastering

== Charts ==
Chart performance for Carnaval de Luz
Chart (2026)	Peak position
Australian Albums (ARIA)	1
Austrian Albums (Ö3 Austria)	1
Belgian Albums (Ultratop Flanders)	1
Belgian Albums (Ultratop Wallonia)	1
Dutch Albums (Album Top 100)	2
Finnish Albums (Suomen virallinen lista)	1
German Albums (Offizielle Top 100)	1
Greek Albums (IFPI)	23
Hungarian Physical Albums (MAHASZ)	22
Irish Albums (Official Charts)	1
Italian Albums (FIMI)	1
Japanese Albums (Oricon)	8
Japanese Combined Albums (Oricon)	11
Japanese Rock Albums (Oricon)	1
New Zealand Albums (RMNZ)	2
Norwegian Albums (IFPI Norge)	2
Scottish Albums (Official Charts)	1
Swedish Albums (Sverigetopplistan)	1
Swiss Albums (Schweizer Hitparade)	1
UK Albums (Official Charts)	1
