= Fireflies (Martin Garrix and U2 song) =

Single by Martin Garrix and U2

from the album Marty
- Released: 24 July 2026
- Genre: Pop rock
- Length: 4:24
- Label: Stmpd; Darkroom
- Songwriters: Martijn Garritsen; Paul David Hewson; David Howell Evans; Simon Edmund Carmody
- Producers: Martin Garrix; Klahr

Martin Garrix singles chronology
"Repeat It" (2026)	"Fireflies" (2026)	"This Dream of You" (2026)

U2 singles chronology
"Street of Dreams" (2026)	"Fireflies" (2026)	"Silencio" (2026)

Music video
- "Fireflies" on YouTube

"Fireflies" is a song by the Dutch DJ Martin Garrix and the Irish rock band U2. Premiered at Tomorrowland 2026 as the closing song of Garrix's main stage DJ set on 17 July 2026, it was released as a single by Stmpd Rcrds and Darkroom Records on 24 July 2026.

== Background ==
"Fireflies" marks the first time U2 as a group has collaborated with Garrix on a lead-artist basis. In May 2021, Garrix released the single "We Are the People", where lead vocalist Bono and lead guitarist the Edge were credited as featured artists. The song was the official anthem of the 2020 UEFA European Football Championship. In November of the same year, U2 released "Your Song Saved My Life" as the lead single from the soundtrack to the 2021 animated musical comedy film Sing 2, on which Garrix is credited for co-production, mixing and mastering.

Bono was also credited as a songwriter on Garrix's 2025 singles "Angels for Each Other" and "Weightless", both of which were collaborations with Indian singer Arijit Singh, as well as the 2026 single "Catharina". Garrix also produced the track "Scars" on the band's Easter Lily EP, which was released in April 2026.

In a statement, Garrix said: "'Fireflies' has a very unique mood. It's a special song we started working on six summers ago. It felt electrifying and very surreal to finally debut it at Tomorrowland with The Edge. I've worked with Bono and Edge before, but working with the whole band I got to get a glimpse of their chemistry and why U2 are who they are. They are incredible friends and collaborators, and it has been an absolute honour to work with them again."

The Edge added: "We go back a long way with Martin. There's always a sense of adventure whenever we get together. Playing Fireflies for the first time at Tomorrowland, in front of one of the most passionate festival crowds anywhere, was such a rush ... in fact I might have enjoyed it a bit too much. It reminded me of why I love playing outdoors. I like it better when there's no ceiling."

== Release and promotion ==
On 17 July 2026, in a surprise appearance, the Edge joined Garrix onstage to perform "Fireflies" for the first time during Garrix's mainstage set on the first weekend of the Tomorrowland music festival held at De Schorre in Boom, Belgium. The Edge played his electric guitar sound over Bono's prerecorded vocals.

Following the song's debut, Garrix posted on social media a video of the live performance, writing on social media that the track will be "out soon". He shared a Feature.fm link for pre-saving the single on streaming services, before revealing that the song would be released on 24 July 2026.

== Composition and production ==
"Fireflies" is a pop rock song that combines Garrix's signature melodic production with U2's anthemic guitar sound. The song features Bono's vocals and builds towards a repeated chorus of: "Fireflies, you and I are fireflies."

== Credits and personnel ==
Credits adapted from Tidal.

- Martin Garrix – composition, production, vocal production, mixing, mastering, guitar
- The Edge – composition, guitar
- Bono – composition, vocals
- Adam Clayton – bass
- Larry Mullen Jr. – drums
- Bram van den Berg – drums
- Jacknife Lee – drums
- Peppe Folliero – mixing, mastering
- Simon Carmody – composition
- Duncan Stewart – drums, guitar
- Manuel Gardner Fernandes – guitar
- Mark Otten – guitar

== Charts ==
Chart performance for "Fireflies"
Chart (2026)	Peak position
Bolivia Anglo Airplay (Monitor Latino)	7
Brazil Airplay (Crowley)	127
Czech Republic Airplay (ČNS IFPI)	38
Finland Airplay (Suomen virallinen lista)	28
Italy Airplay (EarOne)	35
Latvia Airplay (LaIPA)	6
Netherlands (Single Tip)	30
New Zealand Hot Singles (RMNZ)	26
San Marino Airplay (SMRTV Top 50)	29
UK Singles Sales (Official Charts)	21
