= Torn (U2 and Dolly Parton song) =

Single by U2 and Dolly Parton

from the album Carnaval de Luz
- Released: 13 November 2026
- Recorded: 2026
- Genre: Country
- Length: 4:30
- Label: Island; Big Machine
- Composers: U2; Dolly Parton; Johnny McDaid
- Lyricists: Bono; Dolly Parton; Johnny McDaid
- Producer: Jacknife Lee

U2 singles chronology
"The Greatest Show on Earth" (2026)	"Torn" (2026)

"Torn" is a song by the Irish rock band U2 and American country singer-songwriter Dolly Parton. It is the twelfth and final track from U2's sixteenth studio album, Carnaval de Luz, and was released as its fourth single on 13 November 2026 through Island Records. The song was written by U2, Parton and Johnny McDaid of Snow Patrol, and was produced by Jacknife Lee. It features additional instrumentation from longtime U2 collaborator Daniel Lanois.

A duet between Parton and U2 lead vocalist Bono, "Torn" explores familial estrangement and political division. Parton recorded her vocals in Nashville, Tennessee, in June 2026, making it her final recorded vocal performance before her death on 25 August 2026. An alternative country arrangement, subtitled the "Kent Wells Version", premiered on American country radio on 12 November 2026 through Big Machine Records.

== Background and recording ==
U2 initially approached Parton about collaborating on a song entitled "Lifelong", which Bono described as a song about marriage. Parton declined the composition, believing its musical character to be too distinctly Irish, and instead presented the band with a song she had begun writing. She invited U2 to develop the unfinished composition, which subsequently became "Torn". The song was completed in collaboration with Johnny McDaid.

Parton recorded her vocal contributions in Nashville in June 2026. Her vocals were produced by her longtime collaborator Kent Wells and engineered by Joel McKenney. Jacknife Lee oversaw production of the album version, while Daniel Lanois contributed pedal steel guitar.

Following Parton's death on 25 August 2026, Bono paid tribute to the singer by sharing a drawing of her accompanied by lyrics from the song. In an interview with Rolling Stone, Bono recalled that Parton had recorded her contribution despite being ill, and said that the circumstances of the recording had subsequently made the song difficult for him to listen to.

The collaboration was formally confirmed on 24 September 2026 as part of the announcement of Carnaval de Luz. U2 and Parton's representatives confirmed that "Torn" contained her final recorded vocal performance.

During an appearance on the American television programme Jimmy Kimmel Live! in November 2026, Bono and guitarist the Edge discussed the collaboration. The Edge recalled his surprise at Parton's willingness to allow the band to develop her composition, describing U2's approach as an experimental form of country music. Bono interpreted the song as a message of reconciliation intended not only for the United States, but also for other societies experiencing political division.

== Composition ==
"Torn" is a country ballad with a running time of four minutes and 30 seconds. Its arrangement combines Parton and Bono's vocals with synthesisers, restrained percussion and pedal steel guitar performed by Daniel Lanois. Writing for Pitchfork, Walden Green noted the understated electronic pulse and reverberating percussion underlying the duet.

The music was composed by Parton, U2 and Johnny McDaid, with lyrics credited to Parton, Bono and McDaid. The song's narrative concerns a mother whose family has become divided by opposing beliefs, leaving her unable to choose between her estranged children. The lyrics depict the deterioration of relationships between family members, using domestic conflict as a metaphor for wider social and political divisions.

Bono considered using "Civil War" as an alternative title for the composition. The song ultimately retained the title "Torn".

The Kent Wells version presents the composition in a more conventional country arrangement. In addition to the instrumentation featured on the original recording, the alternative version incorporates acoustic guitar, additional electric and steel guitars, keyboards, bass guitar and percussion. It was co-produced by Wells and mixed by Chris Lord-Alge.

== Release ==
On 10 November 2026, Parton's official website announced that a country version of "Torn" would receive a radio premiere on 12 November, one day before the release of Carnaval de Luz. The recording was promoted to country radio by Big Machine Records, Parton's most recent record label.

The Kent Wells version premiered across several American radio networks, including iHeartMedia, Cumulus Media, Audacy and Sirius XM. The album version was subsequently serviced to radio on 13 November 2026.

"Torn" was commercially released on 13 November 2026 as the fourth single from Carnaval de Luz, following "Street of Dreams", "Silencio" and "The Greatest Show on Earth". Its release coincided with that of the album.

The digital single comprised three arrangements of the composition: the original album version, the Kent Wells version and an alternative recording subtitled the "T Bone Burnett Take". Parton's original vocal recording was used across all three versions.

== Lyric videos ==
An accompanying lyric video for the album version of "Torn" was released on 13 November 2026. The video was produced by F-That and runs for four minutes and 31 seconds.

A second lyric video, featuring the Kent Wells version of the song, was released through U2's official YouTube channel on 17 November 2026.

== Critical reception ==
"Torn" received praise from music critics, several of whom highlighted Parton's vocal performance, the song's lyrical themes and its significance as her final recording.

Writing for Rolling Stone, Charisma Madarang singled out "Torn" as a highlight of Carnaval de Luz, drawing attention to Parton's distinctive vocal delivery and the emotional significance of the recording. Dave Simpson of The Guardian described "Torn" as a "hymnal duet", highlighting Lanois's pedal steel guitar and interpreting the song as a message against division. He identified it as a more sombre conclusion to an otherwise uplifting album. Sam Sodomsky of Pitchfork identified "Torn" as one of the stronger moments towards the end of the album, praising the emotional weight afforded by Parton's contribution. Sodomsky considered the song an effective conclusion to an album otherwise focused on the relationship between the four members of U2. In a review for the Los Angeles Times, Mikael Wood praised the song for the interplay between Bono and Parton's voices and its depiction of a family conflict without an assured resolution.

== Track listing ==
Digital single
No.	Title	Length
1.	"Torn"	4:30
2.	"Torn" (Kent Wells Version)	3:41
3.	"Torn" (T Bone Burnett Take)	4:28
Total length:		12:39

== Credits and personnel ==
Credits are adapted from the single's liner notes and Parton's official website.

=== Album version ===
U2

- Bono – vocals
- The Edge – guitar, vocals
- Adam Clayton – bass guitar
- Larry Mullen Jr. – drums

Additional musicians

- Dolly Parton – vocals
- Daniel Lanois – pedal steel guitar
- Jacknife Lee – keyboards, additional guitar, programming

Technical

- Jacknife Lee – production, mixing
- Duncan Stewart – engineering
- Kent Wells – production of Parton's vocals
- Joel McKenney – engineering of Parton's vocals

=== Kent Wells version ===
U2

- Bono – vocals
- The Edge – guitar, vocals
- Adam Clayton – bass guitar
- Larry Mullen Jr. – drums

Additional musicians

- Dolly Parton – vocals
- Daniel Lanois – pedal steel guitar
- Jacknife Lee – keyboards, additional guitar, programming
- Kent Wells – acoustic guitar
- Derek Wells – additional electric guitar
- Scotty Sanders – steel guitar
- Nir Z – additional drums, percussion
- Glenn Worf – additional bass guitar
- Dane Bryant – keyboards

Technical

- Jacknife Lee – production
- Kent Wells – co-production, production of Parton's vocals
- Scott Borchetta – executive production
- Duncan Stewart – engineering
- Joel McKenney – tracking engineering, engineering of Parton's vocals
- Joy Willis – assistant engineering
- Kevin Willis – assistant engineering
- Chris Lord-Alge – mixing
- Ted Jensen – mastering

Artwork

- Shaughn McGrath – design

== Charts ==
Chart (2026)	Peak position
Ireland (IRMA)	45
Netherlands (Single Tip)	21
New Zealand Hot Singles (RMNZ)	8
US Country Airplay (Billboard)	28

== Release history ==
Region	Date	Format	Version	Label	Ref.
United States	12 November 2026	Country radio	Kent Wells Version	Big Machine	
Various	13 November 2026	Radio airplay	Album version	Island	
Various	13 November 2026	Digital download; streaming	Three-track single	Island	
