= Street of Dreams (U2 song) =

Single by U2

from the album Carnaval de Luz
- Released: 7 July 2026
- Genre: Rock
- Length: 3:54
- Label: Island
- Composer: U2
- Lyricists: Bono, the Edge
- Producer: Jacknife Lee

U2 singles chronology
"Atomic City" (2023)	"Street of Dreams" (2026)	"Fireflies" (2026)

"Street of Dreams" is a song by the Irish rock band U2. It is the third track on their sixteenth studio album, Carnaval de Luz, and was released as its lead single on 7 July 2026 through Island Records. The song was produced by longtime U2 collaborator Jacknife Lee, with Duncan Stewart serving as recording engineer.

The song marked the first material released from Carnaval de Luz, U2's first studio album of new material since Songs of Experience in 2017. It received generally positive reviews from music critics and reached number seven on the US Billboard Adult Alternative Airplay chart, making U2 the first act to achieve 30 top-ten entries on the chart.

== Background ==
"Street of Dreams" first became publicly known in May 2026, when U2 travelled to Mexico City to film a music video for the song. On 12 May, the band's official website confirmed that Bono, The Edge, Adam Clayton and Larry Mullen Jr. were in the city filming a video for the previously unreleased track, which was identified as being taken from the band's then-unannounced next studio album, scheduled for release later in 2026. The band also shared footage of themselves performing the song during the shoot.

Filming took place near Plaza de Santo Domingo in Mexico City's historic centre, with the four members of U2 performing on top of a school bus decorated with graffiti by Mexican artist Chavis Mármol. A large crowd gathered during the filming, with fans incorporated into portions of the production.

The following day, U2 continued filming in Mexico City, including at Salón Los Ángeles, where material associated with another unreleased song at the time, "Silencio", was also filmed. "Silencio" was subsequently released on 24 September 2026 as the second track issued from Carnaval de Luz.

The "Street of Dreams" shoot was disrupted by heavy rain and thunderstorms, which caused a generator to fail. A local family subsequently invited the band into their apartment, allowing additional footage to be filmed from the family's balcony. Directors Pasqual Gutiérrez and Raúl "RJ" Sanchez, who work together as filmmaking duo Cliqua, later said that the unexpected weather required the production to alter its original plans.

During the same visit, U2 attended the 2026 Street Child World Cup Finals Tournament at Parque Ecológico Lago de Texcoco. The band had previously supported Street Child United, with Mullen describing the organisation as "a little NGO with a big kick for kids with all of the talent and none of the access".

== Composition ==
Nadine O'Regan of The Irish Times described the track as a "buzzy, uplifting number" and compared its sound to U2's 2004 album How to Dismantle an Atomic Bomb, particularly its single, "Vertigo".

The song begins with Bono's voice multitracked and processed before the arrangement expands with The Edge's guitar. Andrew Korpan of ClutchPoints characterized the track as a modern example of U2's large-scale sound and noted the prominence of Clayton's bass within Lee's production.

The chorus incorporates the Spanish phrase "La calle de los sueños", meaning "the street of dreams". O'Regan characterized the lyrics as positive and affirmative, while noting that the song retained subtler elements of protest compared with the more overtly political material on the band's Days of Ash EP, released earlier in 2026.

== Release and promotion ==
U2 announced the release of "Street of Dreams" on 6 July 2026, one day before its worldwide release. It was released digitally at noon Eastern Time on 7 July through Island Records, with the commercial release consisting of the 3-minute-and-54-second studio version.

At the time of the single's release, the title of its parent album had not been announced. U2 described "Street of Dreams" as the first single from their forthcoming studio album and said that the record, their first album of new material in nine years, would be released later in 2026. On 24 September, U2 announced the album as Carnaval de Luz and confirmed a release date of 13 November 2026.

No commercial physical edition accompanied the single's initial release. Promotional copies were distributed digitally to radio stations and reviewers, including a shortened radio edit alongside the complete studio recording. The promotional radio edit runs approximately 2 minutes and 56 seconds and removes part of the song's introduction.

The song was selected as BBC Radio 2's Record of the Week for 11–17 July 2026.

== Music video ==
The official music video for "Street of Dreams" was released alongside the single on 7 July 2026. Directed by Pasqual Gutiérrez and Raúl "RJ" Sanchez of Cliqua, it was filmed in Mexico City on 12 May 2026 and incorporates footage of the band performing on top of the decorated school bus near Plaza Santo Domingo, scenes involving the crowd gathered for the filming, and footage filmed from a local family's balcony after storms disrupted production.

A behind-the-scenes feature about the production was subsequently published by U2 on 17 July. Several related video versions were also issued, including a studio edit of the Mexico footage, a lyric video and a separate short film.

== Critical reception ==
"Street of Dreams" received generally positive reviews from music critics. Nadine O'Regan of The Irish Times described it as a "buzzy, uplifting number" and praised its radio-friendly sound, comparing it with material from How to Dismantle an Atomic Bomb.

Cat Badra of Audio Ink Radio praised the performances of the four band members and Lee's production, writing that the song did not attempt to reinvent U2's established style but instead demonstrated why the band's sound had endured. Badra particularly highlighted The Edge's guitar work, Clayton's bass and Mullen's drumming, while describing the song's chorus as expansive and Lee's production as polished without overwhelming the band's performances.

Ewan Gleadow of Cult Following awarded the song five stars and considered it stronger than much of the band's preceding material, viewing the track as an encouraging indication of the direction of their forthcoming studio album.

Chris DeVille of Stereogum noted that the single represented a return to new material after several years in which U2 had revisited their back catalogue through re-recordings, archival releases and their U2:UV Achtung Baby Live at Sphere residency. He also observed that despite Bono's earlier comments about wanting U2 to make an AC/DC-influenced rock album, "Street of Dreams" did not resemble that style.

Atwood Magazine described "Street of Dreams" as a "rock anthem of hope", and stated that through it "U2 are issuing a clarion call to all of us to join them in this fight for freedom and emancipation from the tethers of rising populism and authoritarian leaders."

== Commercial performance ==
"Street of Dreams" reached number seven on the US Billboard Adult Alternative Airplay chart in September 2026. The song had previously entered the top ten at number nine in August, giving U2 their 30th top-ten entry on the chart and making them the first act to reach 30 top-ten songs in the ranking's history.

In the United Kingdom, the song reached number 17 on the UK Singles Sales Chart and number 14 on the UK Singles Downloads Chart, spending two weeks on each ranking. In Ireland, it reached number nine on the Irish Homegrown Songs chart.

The song also received significant radio airplay in Italy. It peaked at number 37 on EarOne's overall airplay chart, number 28 on its television airplay chart, number 12 on its international airplay ranking and number one on its rock airplay chart.

== Credits and personnel ==
Credits are adapted from the single's liner notes.

=== U2 ===
- Bono – vocals
- The Edge – guitar, vocals
- Adam Clayton – bass guitar
- Larry Mullen Jr. – drums

=== Additional musicians ===
- Jacknife Lee – keyboards, programming, additional guitar, backing vocals

=== Technical ===
- Jacknife Lee – production
- Duncan Stewart – engineering
- Tom Elmhirst – mixing
- John Webber – mastering

== Charts ==
Chart performance for "Street of Dreams"
Chart (2026)	Peak position
Canada Mainstream Rock (Billboard Canada)	19
Colombia Anglo Airplay (Monitor Latino)	6
Ireland Homegrown (IRMA)	9
Italy Airplay (EarOne)	37
Italy TV Airplay (EarOne)	28
Italy Rock Airplay (EarOne)	1
Italy International Airplay (EarOne)	12
UK Singles Sales (OCC)	17
UK Singles Downloads (OCC)	14
UK Radio Airplay (Radio Monitor)	18
UK Christian Airplay (Cross Rhythms)	4
US Adult Alternative Airplay (Billboard)	7
US Rock & Alternative Airplay (Billboard)	32
