= Easter Lily (EP) =

EP by U2
- Released: 3 April 2026
- Studio: Curlews (Ireland)
- Genre: Rock
- Length: 32:29
- Label: Island
- Producer: Jacknife Lee

U2 chronology
Days of Ash (2026)	Easter Lily (2026)	Carnaval de Luz (2026)

Easter Lily is an EP by the Irish rock band U2. It was produced by Jacknife Lee, and was surprise released on 3 April 2026 through Island Records, coinciding with Good Friday. Easter Lily is the second in a pair of six-track EPs released by U2 to bookend the Lent season; their previous EP, Days of Ash, was released in February on Ash Wednesday. Contrasting with Days of Ash's politically-inspired songs, Easter Lily features lyrical themes of friendship, loss, faith, and renewal. Like its predecessor, the EP was accompanied by an issue of Propaganda, the band's official e-zine.

== Background ==
U2's lead vocalist Bono commented on the surprise release of the EP, the band's second in six weeks, and the nature of its songs, stating:

"We ended up asking very personal questions like: Are our own relationships up to these challenging times? How hard do you fight for friendship? Can our faith survive the mangling of meaning that those algorithms love to reward? Is all religion rubbish and still ripping us apart...? Or are there answers to find in its crevices? Are there ceremonies, rituals, dances that we might be missing in our lives?"

He further remarked that the band were inspired by Patti Smith's album Easter (1978) and the season of Spring as a time of rebirth and renewal in the context of the Christian holiday Easter that celebrates the Resurrection of Christ.

== Composition ==
Easter Lily opens with "Song for Hal," which is a tribute to the band's friend, the music producer Hal Willner, who died in 2020 during the COVID-19 pandemic. The song features rare lead vocals from guitarist the Edge. The second song, "In a Life", celebrates friendship and is described by critics as "a watershed of emotion and transformation" and "an extraordinary ode to their own friendship in U2 that has endured through decades." The Edge said of the song: "I'm reminded not to take friends for granted... none of us know how long we are here. People tell me our music is very emotionally impactful on them. What they don’t know is that we get the same feelings when we play the songs."

The third track, "Scars", is described as a song of encouragement and acceptance that draws inspiration from early 1980s post-punk music; the Edge cited Siouxsie and the Banshees as a musical inspiration. Regarding the lyrics, he stated: "Scars are helpful, mistakes are helpful — if they can be owned, that's the key. When they're hidden or denied, that's bad news. That's the root of narcissism, not self-love but fake perfection. Bono takes this idea someplace else with a reference to the wounds of Christ, reminding us that they were inflicted by the State combined with religious authority. Church and State is a dangerous combo."

"Resurrection Song", the fourth song on the EP, dates back to a demo that the Edge created with producer Jacknife Lee in 2016. Described as a "pilgrimage, a road trip into the unknown with a lover or friend", its lyrics point to defiance against religious cynicism. The song segues into "Easter Parade", which also carries the themes of faith and doubt, the mystery of the Resurrection, and transcendence in the context of current political and social upheaval. It follows the tradition of songs by Johnny Cash, Patti Smith, and Bob Marley, as well as U2 songs including "40" and "Yahweh". The Edge explained that it began as a retread of older U2 songs before being "saved" in the studio by Bono and Lee.

The final track, "Coexist (I Will Bless the Lord at All Times?)", features a soundscape developed by Brian Eno. The song is described as a "lullaby for parents of children caught up in war" and "part hymn, part lullaby" with a "spellbinding palette of sound".

== Release ==
Easter Lily was surprise released on 3 April 2026, coinciding with Good Friday. Initially, it was released only digitally, rather than on any physical mediums. It is the second in a pair of EPs by U2 to bookend the Lent season, following Days of Ash, which was released in February on Ash Wednesday. Easter Lily was accompanied by another issue of Propaganda, U2's official magazine. The 54-page issue described Easter Lily as an internal response to external political and social events that were addressed in Days of Ash.

A physical edition of the EP and Days of Ash were released on the CD and LP deluxe editions of Carnaval de Luz (2026).

== Reception ==
Professional ratings
Aggregate scores
Source	Rating
Metacritic	78/100
Review scores
Source	Rating
AllMusic	3/5 stars
Financial Times	4/5 stars
Mojo	4/5 stars
PopMatters	8/10
The Scotsman	3/5 stars
Uncut	8/10

Keith Cameron of Mojo said that the EP "feels like the strongest collection of material U2 have mustered in at least 20 years, reuniting the band's elemental melodic urges and the spiritual fire that somehow got lost amid the vanilla sonic landscapes of last decade's Songs Of Innocence/Songs Of Experience albums". Ludovic Hunter-Tilney of the Financial Times described the songs as having a "redemptive but not cloying" tone and called "Coexist (I Will Bless the Lord at All Times?)" the highlight of the EP, describing it as "a Brian Eno-assisted electronic meditation about children and war" and that "it restores belief in U2 as a musical force". Comparing the EP to Days of Ash, Fiona Shepherd of The Scotsman called Easter Lily a "lighter collection offer[ing] gentle support across six songs of 'friendship, faith, endurance and renewal'". Neil Z. Yeung of AllMusic called the record "another good sign that U2 still have much to say and the music to back up the message". Andrew Mueller of Uncut said, "It's U2 reconnecting with first principles, all big choruses and defiant optimism, and is confidently glorious." In a joint review of Days of Ash and Easter Lily, Allison Ross of PopMatters said the EPs "sound like lost U2 classics" that gave the impression of the group being "wholly reinvigorated". Ross said that Easter Lily was "even more impactful" than its predecessor, writing: "The instrumentation is lush, the melodies beatific. The band sounds refreshed, imbued with casual conviction – not trying to second-guess what listeners want."

== Track listing ==
All lyrics are written by Bono, except where noted; all music is composed by U2, except where noted.

No.	Title	Lyrics	Music	Length
1.	"Song for Hal"	The Edge; Bono		4:38
2.	"In a Life"			4:33
3.	"Scars"	Bono; Simon Carmody	U2; Martin Garrix; John Martin; Michel Zitron	5:17
4.	"Resurrection Song"			5:02
5.	"Easter Parade"			6:08
6.	"Coexist (I Will Bless the Lord at All Times?)"		Brian Eno; U2	6:48

== Personnel ==
Credits adapted from Tidal.

=== U2 ===
- Bono – vocals (tracks 2–6)
- The Edge – guitar (all tracks), vocals (1–5)
- Adam Clayton – bass guitar
- Larry Mullen Jr. – drums

=== Additional musicians ===
- Jacknife Lee – programming (all tracks), guitar (all tracks), background vocals (1), keyboards (all tracks)
- Brian Eno – keyboards (6)

=== Technical personnel ===
- Jacknife Lee – production (all tracks), mixing (2, 5, 6)
- Tom Elmhirst – mixing (1, 3, 4)
- Duncan Stewart – engineering
- Scott Sedillo – mastering

== Charts ==
Chart performance for Easter Lily
Chart (2026)	Peak position
Australian Albums (ARIA)	30
Austrian Albums (Ö3 Austria)	11
Belgian Albums (Ultratop Flanders)	35
Belgian Albums (Ultratop Wallonia)	30
French Albums (SNEP)	174
French Rock & Metal Albums (SNEP)	5
Irish Albums (Official Charts)	26
Italian Albums (FIMI)	74
Swiss Albums (Schweizer Hitparade)	18
UK Albums (Official Charts)	87
US Top Album Sales (Billboard)	21
