= Silencio (U2 song) =

Single by U2

from the album Carnaval de Luz
- Released: 24 September 2026
- Genre: Garage rock; surf rock
- Length: 2:35
- Label: Island
- Composer: U2
- Lyricist: Bono
- Producers: Jacknife Lee; Ryan Tedder (additional)

U2 singles chronology
"Fireflies" (2026)	"Silencio" (2026)	"The Greatest Show on Earth" (2026)

"Silencio" is a song by the Irish rock band U2. It is the seventh track from their sixteenth studio album Carnaval de Luz, and was released as its second single on 24 September 2026 through Island Records. The song was produced by Jacknife Lee, with additional production by Ryan Tedder. It was released the day prior to the band's 50th anniversary and coincided with the announcement of Carnaval de Luz.

== Background ==
"Silencio" was first publicly heard in May 2026, while U2 were in Mexico City filming material for their forthcoming album, Carnaval de Luz. On 13 May, the band filmed at Salón Los Angeles, a historic ballroom and music venue established in 1937. During the shoot, U2 performed an unreleased song that Bono subsequently identified as "Silencio". The filming took place during the same trip in which the band shot the music video for "Street of Dreams", the album's first single.

On 18 September 2026, U2 previewed "Silencio" in a video posted to their social media accounts commemorating the band's approaching 50th anniversary. The retrospective video incorporated footage spanning U2's career before transitioning to a preview of "Silencio". The accompanying footage included scenes of the band performing at Salón Los Angeles as well as footage shot in the desert for another video.

A second, 21-second excerpt of the song was shared through the band's U2TV Instagram channel on 20 September. U2 formally announced "Silencio" on 22 September, accompanied by another excerpt from the song, and confirmed that it would be released on 24 September 2026.

== Composition ==
"Silencio" is a short, uptempo garage rock and surf rock song incorporating elements of punk rock. The song runs for two minutes and 35 seconds, and was described by U2 as a "homage to early surf-punk insolence". Clash characterised the track as "raw" and "ragged", comparing its sound to the band's early material.

The recording features a prominent guitar riff from the Edge, accompanied by Adam Clayton on bass and Larry Mullen Jr. on drums. Clash described the Edge's playing as "gnarly", while noting the "heaviness" of Clayton's bass and Mullen's drumming. Uncut similarly described the song as a "short, sharp blast of surf-punk".

== Release ==
"Silencio" was formally announced by U2 on 22 September 2026, with the band confirming a release date of 24 September. The song was released digitally on 24 September through Island Records as the second single from the band's sixteenth studio album, Carnaval de Luz, following "Street of Dreams", which had been released in July.

The release coincided with U2's formal announcement of Carnaval de Luz, their first studio album of new material in nine years, which is scheduled for release on 13 November 2026. "Silencio" was made available as a digital download and through streaming services. The single was released one day before the 50th anniversary of the band's formation in September 1976.

== Critical reception ==
Robin Murray of Clash described the song as U2's "best single in...years", praising its directness and energy and comparing aspects of the track to the band's early work. NME's Liberty Dunworth described the track as "playful" and "energetic".

Writing for Music Talkers, Andrew Braithwaite characterised "Silencio" as "short, loud and gloriously impatient", and praised the band for favouring immediacy over the more expansive sound associated with some of their previous work. He highlighted the interplay between Clayton's bass and Mullen's drums, as well as the Edge's guitar playing, and compared the song's energy to U2's earlier material.

Writing for Cult Following, Ewan Gleadow awarded "Silencio" four out of five stars, calling it a "short and sweet rocker" and praising Clayton and Mullen for providing a "strong foundation" for the Edge's guitar playing. Gleadow described the song as a "rallying cry" and compared its repeated title and climactic guitar work to the Pixies, while suggesting that its brief running time made it feel like a preview of what the band could explore further.

== Credits and personnel ==
Credits are adapted from Tidal.

U2

- Bono – vocals
- The Edge – guitar, vocals
- Adam Clayton – bass guitar
- Larry Mullen Jr. – drums, percussion

Additional musicians

- Jacknife Lee – keyboards

Technical

- Jacknife Lee – production
- Ryan Tedder – additional production
- Duncan Stewart – engineering
- Matt Bishop – engineering
- Rich Rich – mixing
- Chris Gehringer – mastering

== Charts ==
Chart (2026)	Peak position
Argentina Anglo Airplay (Monitor Latino)	9
Belgium (Ultratop 50 Wallonia)	49
Bolivia Anglo Airplay (Monitor Latino)	4
Canada Mainstream Rock (Billboard Canada)	11
Central America Anglo Airplay (Monitor Latino)	15
Colombia Anglo Airplay (Monitor Latino)	9
Costa Rica Anglo Airplay (Monitor Latino)	13
Guatemala Anglo Airplay (Monitor Latino)	13
Ireland Homegrown (IRMA)	5
Italy Airplay (EarOne)	32
Japan Hot 100 (Billboard)	81
Lithuania Airplay (TopHit)	94
San Marino Airplay (SMRTV Top 50)	27
UK Singles Sales (Official Charts)	39
Uruguay Anglo Airplay (Monitor Latino)	14
US Hot Rock & Alternative Songs (Billboard)	47
US Rock & Alternative Airplay (Billboard)	27
