= Days of Ash =

EP by U2
- Released: 18 February 2026
- Studios: Curlews (Ireland); Universal (U.S.)
- Genre: Rock
- Length: 23:30
- Label: Island
- Producer: Jacknife Lee

U2 chronology
| Songs of Surrender (2023) | Days of Ash (2026) | Easter Lily (2026) |

Singles from Days of Ash
- 1. "Song of the Future" Released: 18 February 2026

Days of Ash is an EP by the Irish rock band U2. Produced by Jacknife Lee, it was released on 18 February 2026 through Island Records, coinciding with Ash Wednesday. The six-track EP contains five new songs, including protest songs addressing Russia's invasion of Ukraine, the killings of Minneapolis woman Renée Good, Iranian teenager Sarina Esmailzadeh, and Palestinian activist Awdah Hathaleen, as well as a poem by Israeli poet Yehuda Amichai set to music. It was the first collection of newly written songs to be released by the band since their 2017 studio album Songs of Experience. The EP release was accompanied by a lyric video for each track and a one-off special edition of the group's official magazine, Propaganda. Less than two months later, the group followed it up with the surprise release of another six-track EP, Easter Lily, in April 2026.

== Background ==
U2's lead vocalist Bono commented on the sudden release of the EP, and the nature of its contents, stating: "These EP tracks couldn't wait; these songs were impatient to be out in the world. They are songs of defiance and dismay, of lamentation". He also confirmed that a studio album would follow later in 2026, with songs of a different style: "The songs on Days of Ash are very different in mood and theme to the ones we're going to put on our album later in the year".

The EP marks the return of U2's drummer Larry Mullen Jr., who was forced to sit out the band's 2023−2024 concert residency at Sphere to recuperate from surgery. He said, "we've never shied away from taking a position and sometimes that can get a bit messy, there's always some sort of blowback, but it's a big side of who we are and why we still exist". U2 guitarist the Edge stated that U2 believes in "a world where borders are not erased by force" and Bono recognised the positive impact of Jewish morality, and scientists, writers and songwriters; he also commented that "the rape, murder and abduction of Israelis on 7 October was evil, but self-defence is no defence for the sweeping brutality of Netanyahu's response", and "ask anyone in east Germany or Poland or Latvia if they think Putin will stop at Ukraine if he can get away with it?" The band mentioned that financial contributions will be made to the UNHCR, the Committee to Protect Journalists, and Amnesty International.

== Composition ==
Days of Ash opens with the song "American Obituary", which is dedicated to Renée Good, a Minneapolis woman who was shot and killed in 2026 by agents of United States Immigration and Customs Enforcement (ICE). Bono described the song as "a little more punk rock" than their 1983 song "Sunday Bloody Sunday". The lyrical cadence was a nod to one of Bono's favourite songs, "It's Alright, Ma (I'm Only Bleeding)" by Bob Dylan; in Dylan's song, the child is singing to the mother, while "American Obituary" reverses the roles. The second song, "The Tears of Things", takes its title from the 2025 book The Tears of Things: Prophetic Wisdom for an Age of Outrage by Richard Rohr. The song's lyrics evoke a conversation between Michelangelo and his statue of David in the context of the Gaza war. "Song of the Future" pays tribute to Sarina Esmailzadeh, a 16-year-old Iranian schoolgirl who was beaten to death in 2022 by authorities for participating in the Mahsa Amini protests.

The fourth track, "Wildpeace", is a poem by Israeli poet Yehuda Amichai that is read by Nigerian artist Adeola Fayehun, set to music by the EP's producer Jacknife Lee. The song "One Life at a Time" was written in honour of the Palestinian activist Awdah Hathaleen, who was killed in 2025 in his West Bank village by an Israeli settler. The song's title comes from a phrase spoken at Hathaleen's funeral by Basel Adra, who directed the 2024 documentary film No Other Land on which Hathaleen consulted; Adra lamented that Palestinians were being eradicated "one life at a time". For the song, Bono reinterpreted the phrase as a "existential suggestion" that the world can be changed "for the better or for the worse... one life at a time".

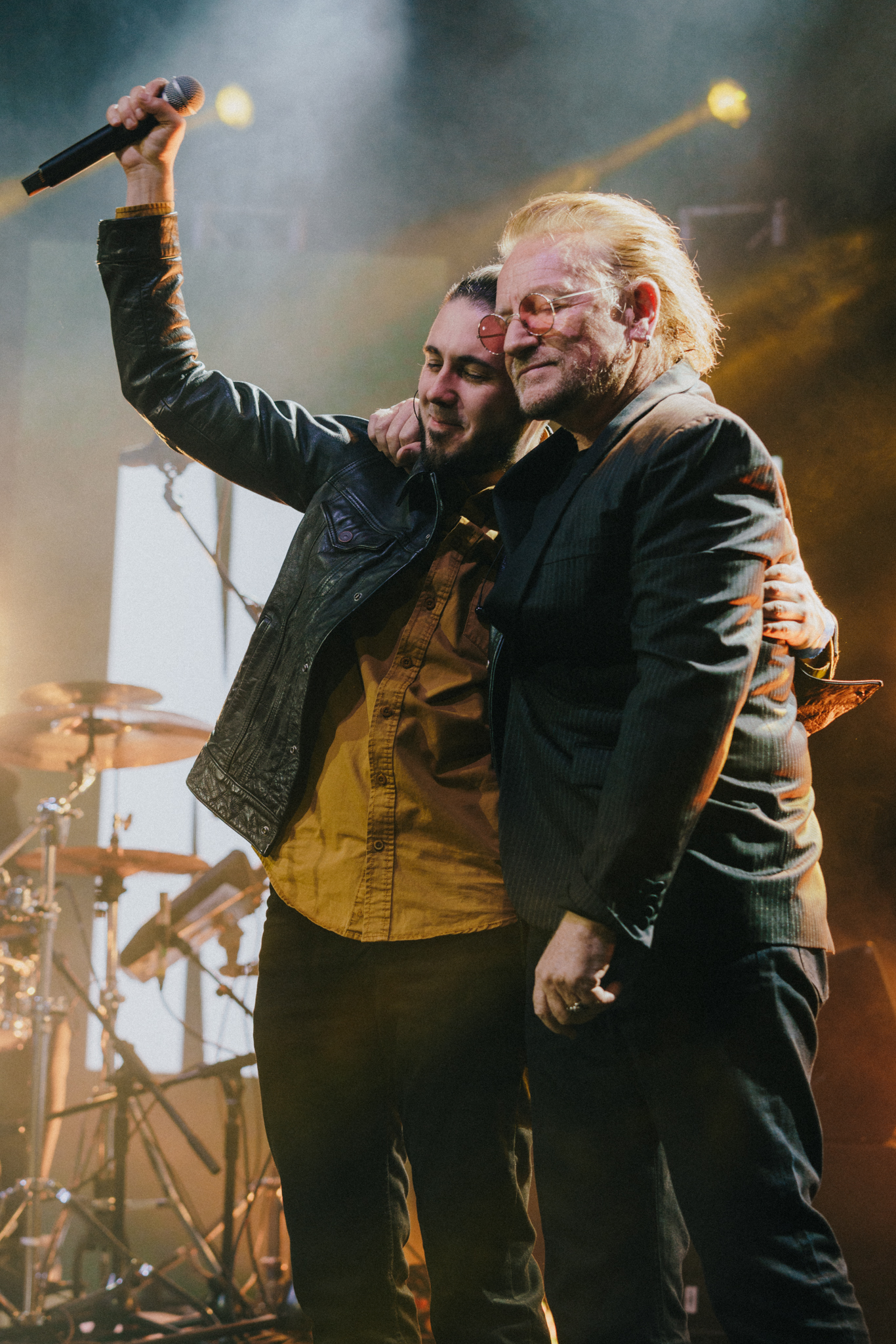
Ukrainian singer Taras Topolia, pictured with Bono in 2023, is a guest performer on the closing song "Yours Eternally".

The EP closes with the song "Yours Eternally", which features guest vocals by the English musician Ed Sheeran and the Ukrainian singer-turned-soldier Taras Topolia. Through a mutual connection with Sheeran, Bono and the Edge met Topolia during their 2022 performance at a Kyiv subway station shortly after Russia's invasion of Ukraine. The song's lyrics take the form of a letter written by a Ukrainian soldier on active duty to his friends back home saying, "you better be having a good time back there". Sheeran sings a verse that serves as a reply to the soldier's letter.

== Release ==
Days of Ash was surprise released on 18 February 2026, coinciding with Ash Wednesday. Initially, it was released only digitally, rather than on any physical mediums. It was accompanied by a one-off digital edition of Propaganda, U2's official magazine. The 52-page issue described Days of Ash as "six postcards from the present... Wish we weren't here". The magazine contains interviews with the band members and other contributors, as well as illustrations. The EP release was also accompanied by lyric videos for each song.

A copy of Days of Ash on compact disc and a printed version of the Propaganda issue will be offered to subscribers of U2.com for 2026. A physical edition of the EP and its companion Easter Lily were released on the CD and LP deluxe editions of Carnaval de Luz (2026).

== Reception ==
Professional ratings
Aggregate scores
| Source | Rating |
|---|---|
| Metacritic | 79/100 |
Review scores
| Source | Rating |
| AllMusic | 3.5/5 stars |
| The Daily Telegraph | 4/5 stars |
| The Guardian | 4/5 stars |
| Mojo | 4/5 stars |
| Pitchfork | 6.0/10 |
| PopMatters | 8/10 |
| The Scotsman | 4/5 stars |
| The Standard | 5/5 stars |
| The Times | 4/5 stars |
| Uncut | 8/10 |

In a four-star review, Alexis Petridis of The Guardian found the songs a return to form for U2, saying that they "reaffirm[ed] the band as a vital political force" and "that zeal, purpose and belief has been recaptured". The songs were likened to U2's 1983 album War and were likewise noted for their combination of biblical imagery and political messaging. Una Mullally of The Irish Times described the band as "reinvigorated" with the songs having a "surprising urgency [with] power and tenderness". Specific regard was given to "The Tears of Things", which was described as "melodically and structurally rather stunning". The song "Yours Eternally" was praised as being "an immediate and technicolour banger". Billboard called Days of Ash an "emotional, classically stirring U2 collection" and felt that U2 "met the moment" with the material attuned to the current political and social climate. In a joint review of Days of Ash and Easter Lily, Allison Ross of PopMatters said the EPs "sound like lost U2 classics" that gave the impression of the group being "wholly reinvigorated". Ross said that the band were "far better when they lean heavily into their latent passions and outrage".

Writing in The Daily Telegraph, critic Neil McCormick gave Days of Ash four out of five stars and described it as U2's most overtly political and urgent release in years, comparing its themes and intensity to the band's protest-era work of the 1980s. He highlighted the EP's focus on contemporary global conflicts and social unrest, noting a mix of punk-driven aggression and more reflective, melodic material. McCormick singled out "The Tears of Things" as a standout track with a poetic, meditative, and atmospheric character with anthemic qualities. Pat Carty in The Irish Independent wrote that Days of Ash was their best release in decades, and that "American Obituary" in particular, "rocks like a battleship balancing on a bottle of milk". Andrew Mueller of Uncut called the EP "anguished addresses of the world's current turbulence, U2 needing to scrabble unusually and interestingly hard in the cinders to disinter sparks of their trademark redemptive optimism". He said that the song "Yours Eternally" "articulates the most U2-ish of sentiments" with the lyric "If you have the chance to hope, it's a duty".

In March 2026, Esquire named it one of five best albums of the year to that point.

== Track listing ==
All lyrics are written by Bono, except where noted; all music is composed by U2, except where noted.

Days of Ash track listing
| No. | Title | Lyrics | Music | Length |
|---|---|---|---|---|
| 1. | "American Obituary" | | | 4:23 |
| 2. | "The Tears of Things" | | | 5:25 |
| 3. | "Song of the Future" | | | 3:55 |
| 4. | "Wildpeace" (spoken word by Adeola) | Yehuda Amichai | U2; Jacknife Lee | 1:18 |
| 5. | "One Life at a Time" | Bono; The Edge | | 4:03 |
| 6. | "Yours Eternally" (featuring Ed Sheeran and Taras Topolia) | Bono; The Edge; Ed Sheeran; Simon Carmody | | 4:26 |

== Personnel ==
Credits adapted from Tidal.

=== U2 ===
- Bono – vocals (tracks 1–3, 5, 6)
- The Edge – guitar (all tracks), vocals (1–3, 5, 6)
- Adam Clayton – bass guitar
- Larry Mullen Jr. – drums

=== Additional musicians ===
- Jacknife Lee – programming (2–6), guitar (2, 3, 5, 6), piano (2, 5), background vocals (3), keyboards (4, 6), synthesizer (4), additional vocals (6)
- Adeola – spoken word (4)
- Ed Sheeran – vocals (6)
- Taras Topolia – vocals (6)
- Bob Geldof – choir vocals (6)
- Chupryna Valeria – choir vocals (6)
- Dmytro Vodovozov – choir vocals (6)
- Dmytro Zholud – choir vocals (6)
- Jeanne Marine – choir vocals (6)
- Kateryna Motrych – choir vocals (6)
- Maksym Syvolap – choir vocals (6)
- Mykhailo Chirko – choir vocals (6)
- Nadya Tolokonnikova – choir vocals (6)
- Sergii Vusyk – choir vocals (6)
- Vladyslav Greziev – choir vocals (6)

=== Technical personnel ===
- Jacknife Lee – production (all tracks), mixing (1, 2, 4)
- Duncan Stewart – engineering
- Tom Elmhirst – mixing (3, 5, 6)
- Scott Sedillo – mastering

== Charts ==
Chart performance for Days of Ash
| Chart (2026) | Peak position |
|---|---|
| Australian Albums (ARIA) | 54 |
| Austrian Albums (Ö3 Austria) | 14 |
| Belgian Albums (Ultratop Flanders) | 14 |
| Belgian Albums (Ultratop Wallonia) | 8 |
| French Albums (SNEP) | 123 |
| French Rock & Metal Albums (SNEP) | 5 |
| German Albums (Offizielle Top 100) | 87 |
| Irish Albums (Official Charts) | 32 |
| Italian Albums (FIMI) | 45 |
| Japanese Digital Albums (Oricon) | 10 |
| Swedish Physical Albums (Sverigetopplistan) | 9 |
| Swiss Albums (Schweizer Hitparade) | 8 |
| UK Albums Sales (OCC) | 8 |
| US Top Album Sales (Billboard) | 18 |
