= The Golden Horde (band) =

Irish rock band

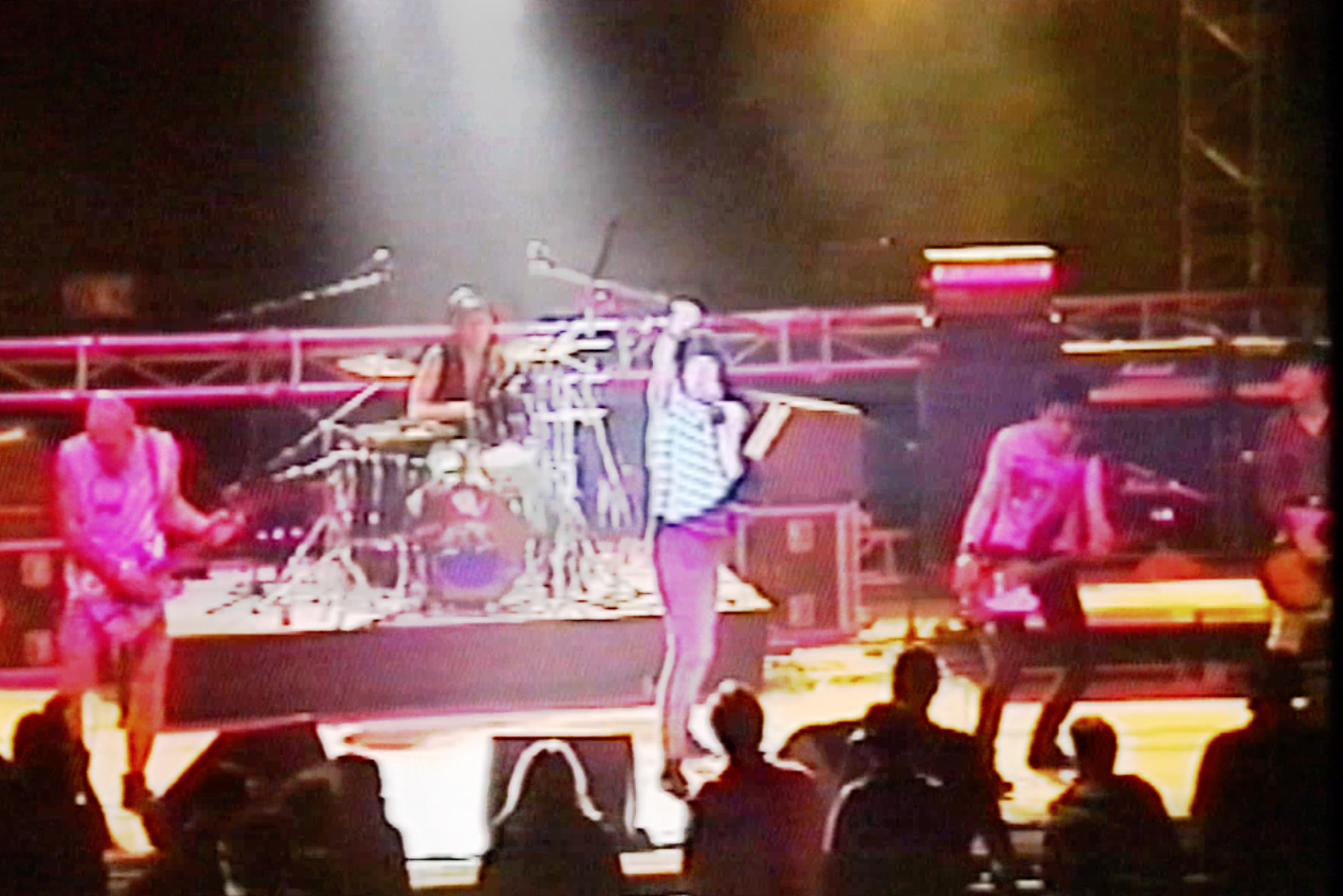
The Golden Horde, live: (L-R): Des, Peter, Simon, John & Sam.

The Golden Horde were a neo-psychedelic, post-punk, garage rock, band based in Dublin, Ireland.

Simon Carmody, John Connor, Des O'Byrne, Peter O'Kennedy & Sam Steiger, are the most renowned line-up of the band. The group first formed in 1982 and disbanded in spring 1994, the members going their separate ways to pursue a variety of artistic projects. Golden Horde supporters maintain an internet presence across social media and fan sites, with rare, unreleased studio, and live performances being shared as they are unearthed.

"The Golden Horde are the group to break all rules, owing allegiance to none, sworn to weirdness & quite determined to steal every idea that ain't tied down...inestimably brilliant."
- Sounds magazine (UK)

== History ==
Regarded as some of the few musicians to stick to their principles that they arguably did a disservice to their career, nevertheless, the band did attain some commercial success. Yet, that in itself has always been surpassed by the cult underground following The Golden Horde retain to the present day. Their influence across a variety of alternative musical acts, which continues to propagate further with the digitization of rare, unreleased, and live recordings, and performances. Their own music was inspired by such artists such as The Ramones, Scott Walker, Johnny Thunders, The Faces, The Byrds, The Velvet Underground, The Damned, Slade, The Rolling Stones, The Cramps, T-Rex, Big Star, and The Stooges.

In 1982 the group featured thirteen band members on stage, progressing to a five-piece line-up as the sporadic project became a band proper. The first recording, the art punk, garage rock EP: Dig That Crazy Grave, was released in 1983. Followed by the first EP-album, The Chocolate Biscuit Conspiracy!, in 1984, and featuring spoken-word contributions from futurist and satirist Robert Anton Wilson. From this album, the single, "Young & Happy", was chosen as the theme song for the EuroSurf '85 championships.

The Golden Horde's Des O' Byrne scored the music for the premiere performance of Robert Anton Wilson's "Wilhelm Reich in Hell" play, which debuted at the Edmund Burke Hall in Trinity College, Dublin. Wilson later went on to include 'The Golden Horde' (as a fictitious rock group performing at a music festival) in The Historical Illuminatus Chronicles. John Connor succeeded bass guitarist Donal Murray (1982-1985), and along with the addition of second guitarist, Sam Steiger, calibrated what was to become the most acclaimed line-up of The Golden Horde 1985–1994. The second EP-album ...in Reality, recorded throughout 1985, was released in 1986.

Numerous BBC and RTÉ Radio Sessions were completed between 1985–1993, featuring Golden Horde originals as well as their own often eclectic choice of one-off cover songs. Bernie Furlong parted ways with the band, in 1987, to pursue other artistic interests. In 1988, The Golden Horde performed at the "Eurorock (EuroSonic) Festival" in Groningen, Holland, whereupon esteemed journalist and music critic Wierd Duk wrote: "Apart from the solid Ramones-like rock'n'roll of The Golden Horde, the rest of Europe had no bands worth mentioning." That same night the Horde followed up their intense one-hour-and-forty-five-minute set performance at the festival with a second secret 'free' show at "Club Vera", in Groningen. Bootleg recordings of these shows circulate amongst GH supporters and collectors.

The Golden Horde contributed to the Temple St Children's Charity Concert, performing along with The Dubliners and The Pogues. During this period the band played with acts such as The Fall, The Ramones, The Prisoners, The Damned, Johnny Thunders, Thee Mighty Caesars, The Cramps, The Pogues and The Nomads.

Recording under the pseudonym 'The Last Bandits (in the World)' i.e. the Golden Horde and friends (including): Henry McCullough, Steve Wickham, Johnny Fean, Nikki Sudden and Anthony Thistlethwaite, yielded the recordings "The Angels are Calling", "Christmas Morning", "Til The Next Goodbye" and the album The Last Bandits. All recordings were remastered and re-released in 2018.

Other recording projects/collaborations during this period were sessions written and recorded with Mick Blood of Australian band the Lime Spiders, as well as sessions with Producer Denny Cordell. The band spent a substantial period with engineer Paul Thomas at his infamous studio 'The Recording Company' developing many tracks that would be utilized as b-sides - with many others that are slowly resurfacing on social media.

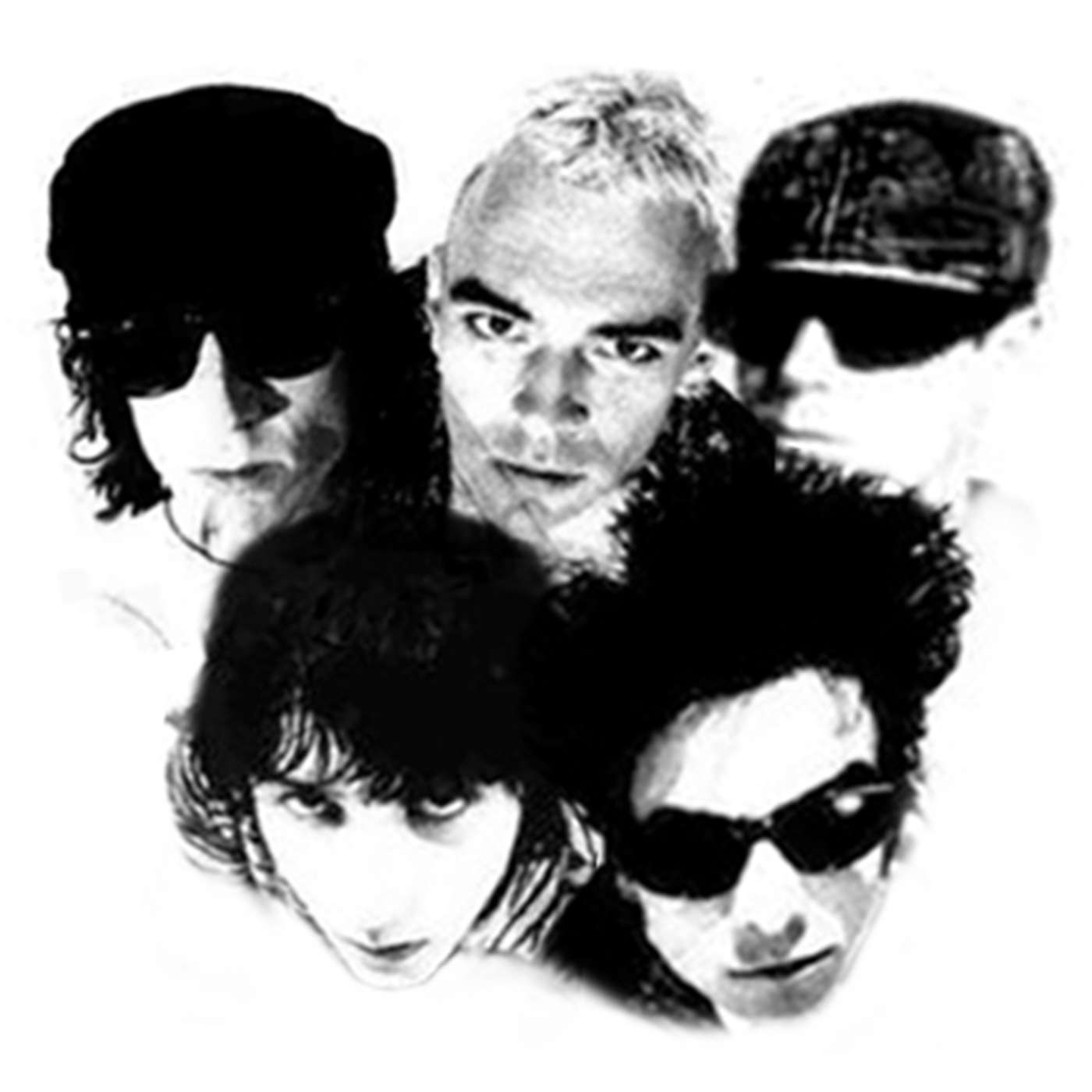
The Golden Horde (clockwise from top L): Simon Carmody, Des O'Byrne, Peter O'Kennedy, John Connor & Sam Steiger.

From April–May 1990, Johnny Thunders, during an acoustic tour of Britain and Ireland, joined up with John Connor, Sam Steiger & Peter O'Kennedy of The Golden Horde for electric performances. Johnny had befriended and performed with the Horde previously, beginning in 1984 at the TV Club, Dublin and Belfast and both acts were concurrently on tour (of the UK & Ireland) at that time. On 8 May 1990 recording sessions in London for a joint EP-single cover version with The Golden Horde of "Sugar, Sugar" by The Archies, and original material, had to be canceled when Johnny experienced "health problems" following his performances in Wakefield, UK while on tour.

After declining major label 'sell-out' offers for many years The Golden Horde finally signed to Mother/Island Records label. The independent-style label had been established by U2 and appealed to the Horde's indie, home-grown perspective, and they were to be the vanguard act as Mother Records transitioned to being an independent label proper.

During this time period The Golden Horde performed at many European festivals, as well as the 'SunStroke Festival' at Dalymount Park with Sonic Youth, Hole, Red Hot Chili Peppers, and Ice Cube, the infamous 'Fleadh Mór (1993) at Tramore Stadium' and numerous unbilled appearances at 'Feile' festivals held at Semple Stadium (between 1990–1993). They also headlined 'The European Skateboarding Expo Festival' — in 1991 at The Point Depot, Dublin.

Recordings for the singles "100 Boys" and "I Never Came Down" were initiated with producer Daniel Rey, and completed with co-producer Andy Shernoff for the album that would be eponymously titled The Golden Horde. Music videos for "100 Boys" and "Friends in Time" (see YouTube etc.) were shot with friend Richie Smith later also director of The Siege of Jadotville.

Released in 1991, the eponymously-titled album (The Golden Horde) was voted joint No. 1 record with U2's Achtung Baby in the Hot Press Irish Music Awards for that year. Singer and Golden Horde cohort Maria McKee, contributed vocals to the songs "Hell" and "Friends in Time" amongst others on the album. The album was again celebrated in the book 101 Irish Records You Must Hear Before You Die (2012): "...one of the very few Irish Rock Singers that you could have easily imagined charming the pants off arena audiences...band members stepped up to the mark as the coolest cohorts of any Irish rock act before or since." - Tony Clayton-Lea

Tim McGrath succeeded Peter O'Kennedy as the permanent drummer in 1993 (during the intervening two months Justin Healy filled in). The Golden Horde performed with U2 on their Zoo TV Zooropa tour. The final Golden Horde show was their performance at the 'Cradle Benefit for Bosnian Children', City Hall, Cork in December 1993 (the event also featured Shane MacGowan and Nick Cave). The Golden Horde parted ways in early 1994.

"Onstage, the classic lineup that ran from around 1984 to ’94 of Simon Carmody, John Connor, Des Byrne, Peter O’Kennedy and Sam Steiger were Superstars. Any one of them could have led the band. They dripped star quality and were head and shoulders above the local scene".
- Tom Dunne, (music journalist), 2023

== Discography ==
=== Studio albums ===
- Chocolate Biscuit Conspiracy (1985)
- In Reality (1986 Mini-album)
- The Golden Horde (1991)

=== EPs/Singles ===
- Dig That Crazy Grave EP (1984)
- Young and Happy EP (1985)
- 100 Boys (1989) Highest chart placement - 23
- I Never Came Down (1990)
- Endless Weekend (1991)
- Friends in Time w/ Maria McKee (1991) Highest chart placement - 14
- Hell (1992)

== Members ==
- Simon Carmody – vocals 1982–94
- John Connor – bass, guitar, vocals 1986–94
- Sam Steiger – guitar, vocals 1985–94
- Tim McGrath – drums 1992–94
- Des O'Byrne – guitar, vocals 1982–94

Previous members:

- Peter O'Kennedy – drums, vocals 1983–92
- Justin Healy – drums Dec 1992
- Bernie Furlong – co-vocals 1982–86
- Donal Murray – bass 1982–85
- Adrienne Foley – co-vocals 1982
- Caroline Harvey-Kelly – co-vocals 1982
- Simon Walker – drums 1982
