= Experience + Innocence Tour =

2018 concert tour by U2

- World tour by U2
- Promotional poster for the tour
- Location: North America; Europe
- Associated album: Songs of Experience
- Start date: 2 May 2018
- End date: 13 November 2018
- Legs: 2
- No. of shows: 60
- Attendance: 923,733
- Box office: $126.2 million

U2 concert chronology
- The Joshua Tree Tour 2017 (2017); Experience + Innocence Tour (2018); The Joshua Tree Tour 2019 (2019)

The Experience + Innocence Tour (styled as eXPERIENCE + iNNOCENCE Tour) was a worldwide concert tour by the Irish rock band U2. Staged in support of the band's 2017 album, Songs of Experience, the tour visited arenas throughout 2018. Comprising two legs and 60 concerts, the Experience + Innocence Tour visited North America from May through July, and Europe from August through November. It began on 2 May 2018 in Tulsa, Oklahoma, and ended on 13 November 2018 in Berlin, Germany. The tour followed U2's 2015 Innocence + Experience Tour as the second in a pair of tours in support of the group's companion albums, Songs of Innocence (2014) and Songs of Experience.

The 2018 tour reprised the loose autobiographical narrative from the 2015 tour, along with the original's multifaceted stage comprising a rectangular main stage, circular B-stage, connecting walkway, and doubled-sided LED video screen with an interior walkway. Several enhancements were made to the set, such as a higher resolution and more transparent video screen and the addition of LED panels to the B-stage floor. The band incorporated augmented reality into the tour, building it into a mobile app for fans to use, as well as using it to revive lead vocalist Bono's demonic stage character "MacPhisto" from the Zoo TV Tour in 1993.

Having toured in 2017 to commemorate the 30th anniversary of The Joshua Tree, the band decided not to perform any songs from that record on the Experience + Innocence Tour, leaving out some of their most well-known tracks and live staples. The band also omitted several of their earlier 1980s catalog, choosing instead to focus shows on their Songs of Experience and Innocence albums as well as their 1990s and newer music. One such song performed live was the oft-requested 1991 song "Acrobat" for the first time in their career.

Ticket purchases for the Experience + Innocence Tour included copies of Songs of Experience, helping the album reach number one on the US Billboard 200. The tour made use of Ticketmaster's "Verified Fan" platform in an attempt to combat ticket scalping, making U2 the first group to do so for an arena tour. The Experience + Innocence Tour received positive reviews and grossed $126.2 million from 923,733 tickets sold.

== Background ==
In 2014, U2 released their thirteenth studio album, Songs of Innocence, which they supported with the Innocence + Experience Tour in 2015. The group originally began it with the intent to tour in two phases, one with material primarily taken from Songs of Innocence and one with material that would eventually be from its follow-up, the companion album Songs of Experience. However, slow progress on the Experience record delayed the second tour. Bassist Adam Clayton said, "By the time we finished the Innocence tour and came full circle to focus on the [Songs of Experience] album, it was clear we weren't going to be able to flip it really quickly into the Experience side of the material and put it right back out on tour." When asked in 2017 about plans to continue the Innocence + Experience Tour, guitarist the Edge said, "We feel like that tour wasn't finished. So right now, we'd love to finish that tour. I would imagine it's gonna be with very similar production components... But we like that tour and that project wasn't completed. It is still alive in our minds creatively."

Several other factors contributed to a delay. Due to the shift of global politics in a conservative direction, highlighted by the United Kingdom's Brexit referendum and the 2016 US presidential election, the band decided to delay Songs of Experience from its planned release in the fourth quarter of 2016 to reassess its tone and whether it was still communicating what they wanted it to. The group also committed to a 2017 concert tour to commemorate the 30th anniversary of their album The Joshua Tree. Furthermore, lead vocalist Bono suffered what he referred to as a "brush with mortality" shortly after Christmas 2016, further affecting the direction of Songs of Experience.

== Development ==
Both the 2015 and 2018 tours were structured around a loose autobiographical narrative about U2, grounded in the story of the death of Bono's mother and the violence of the Troubles that shaped the band members' youths in Ireland. Whereas Songs of Innocence explicitly revisits memories of their adolescence, Songs of Experience took "a more macro narrative stance, almost as if the narrator is writing from beyond life", according to tour designer Es Devlin. Accordingly, the narrative for the 2018 tour was reframed, using the lyric "Now you're at the other end of the telescope" from the Experience song "Love Is All We Have Left" as a guiding principle. Bono said the group intended the 2018 tour to be "less self-indulgent" and wanted to stay current by incorporating new technology and audience interaction into the production.

Production Resource Group (PRG), which has been involved in each U2 tour since 1992, began planning the Experience + Innocence Tour in September 2017. The firm started by trying to solve the weight problem from the original tour, an issue further complicated by the band's request to make the LED screens higher resolution, more transparent, and able to support an augmented reality (AR) element. The firm re-thought how to design an LED screen and devised a new system called Pure10.

== Set design and show production ==
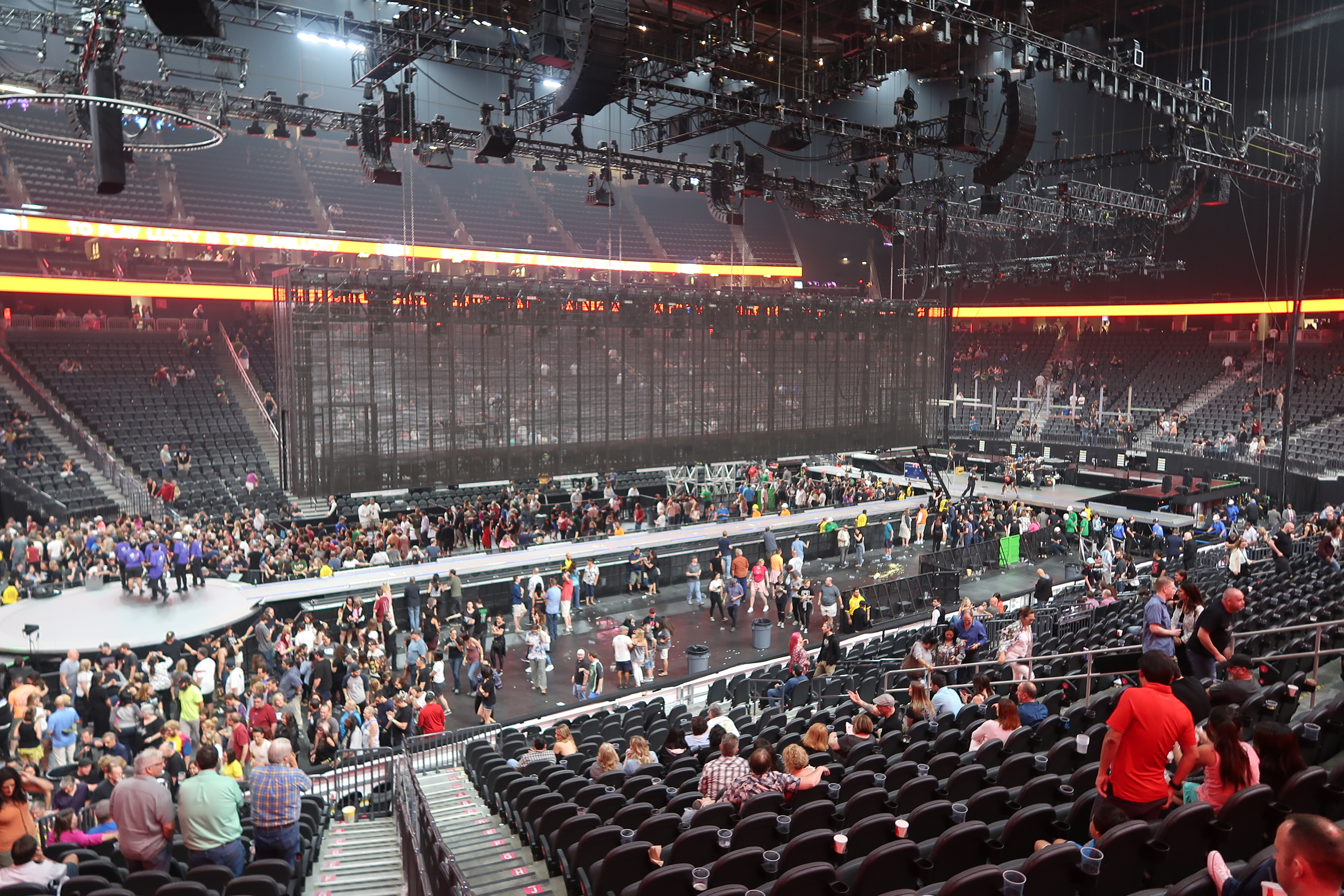
Like the original tour, the stage for the Experience + Innocence tour comprised a rectangular main stage (right), a circular B-stage (left), a connecting walkway, and a large video screen suspended above the walkway.

The tour reprised the same multi-faceted stage setup from the Innocence + Experience Tour. At one end of the venue was the rectangular main stage, which measured 19.4 metres (64 ft) wide by 10.8 metres (35 ft) deep. At the opposite end was a circular B-stage, which measured 7.3 metres (24 ft) in diameter. Connecting the two stages was a 36.5-metre-long (120 ft) walkway. Suspended above it was a double-sided LED screen with an interior walkway, called the "barricage", which measured 29 metres (95 ft) long by 7 metres (23 ft) high.

Several technological enhancements were made over the original version of the set. PRG's Pure10 video panels featured a pixel pitch of 10 millimetres (0.39 in), which alone nearly tripled the display resolution of the "barricage" screen and thus enabled an AR event to be triggered. Ordinarily, this would have decreased the transparency of the display, since the printed circuit boards (PCBs) attached to the LED panels were moved closer together. PRG solved this problem by slicing the PCBs into strips, rotating them 90 degrees, and mounting the LEDs on the sides. Jeroen Hallaert, director of PRG Projects North America, explained that the result was "giant venetian blind" that provided 75 percent transparency, compared to the 45 percent transparency of the original screen. Overall, the video screen for the 2018 tour had a resolution nine times greater than the original. The Pure10 video tiles were 1 m × 2 m (3 ft 3 in × 6 ft 7 in) and were about a quarter the thickness of those from the 2015 tour.

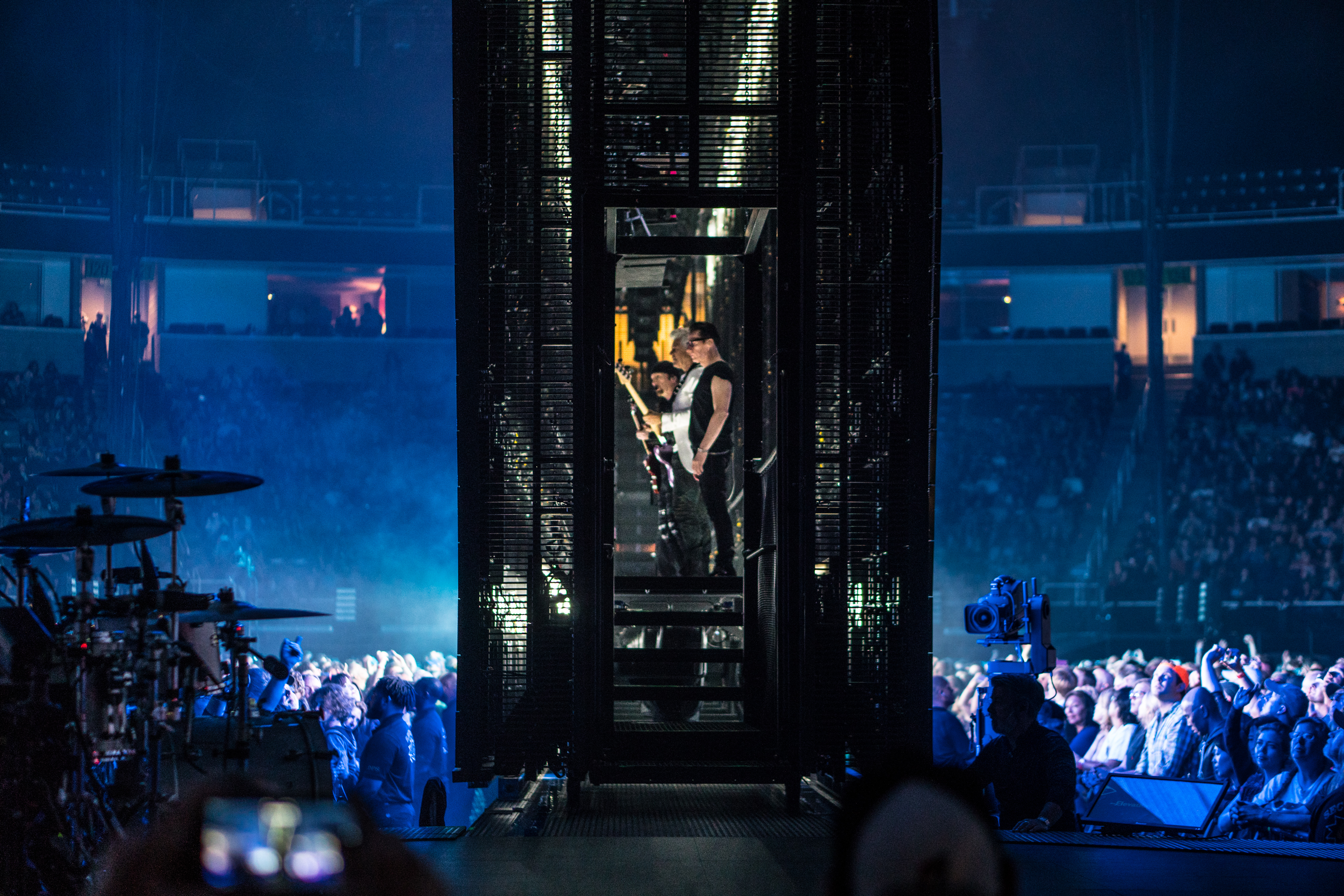
A side view of the "barricage", with the band members standing on a platform between the LED screens

PRG used their experience building the SPACEFRAME framing system for U2's Joshua Tree Tour 2017 to design a carbon fibre structure to hold the Pure10 panels, rather than one made from conventional metal. This reduced the weight by almost 2 pounds per square foot (9.8 kg/m^{2}) of panels, resulting in a total weight reduction of almost half. As a result, the number of trucks needed for transportation was also halved, compared to the Innocence + Experience Tour. The "barricage" weighed 45,000 pounds (20,000 kg), and was suspended by eight hoist motors by Tait, each weighing 3 short tons (2.7 t), built into a custom truss. With the weight reduction of the "barricage", the interior walkway could move independently from the two video displays, compared to the 2015 version; the 18 Tait Nav Hoists built into a truss inside the structure allowed the walkway to be raised, lowered, or tilted by 5 degrees. Other Tait products built into the interior truss were: a T-Winch, to raise and lower a staircase near the main stage; a Nav Hoist, to control a "performer platform" near the B-stage; and a Big Tow Winch, to raise and lower a drum set inside the structure.

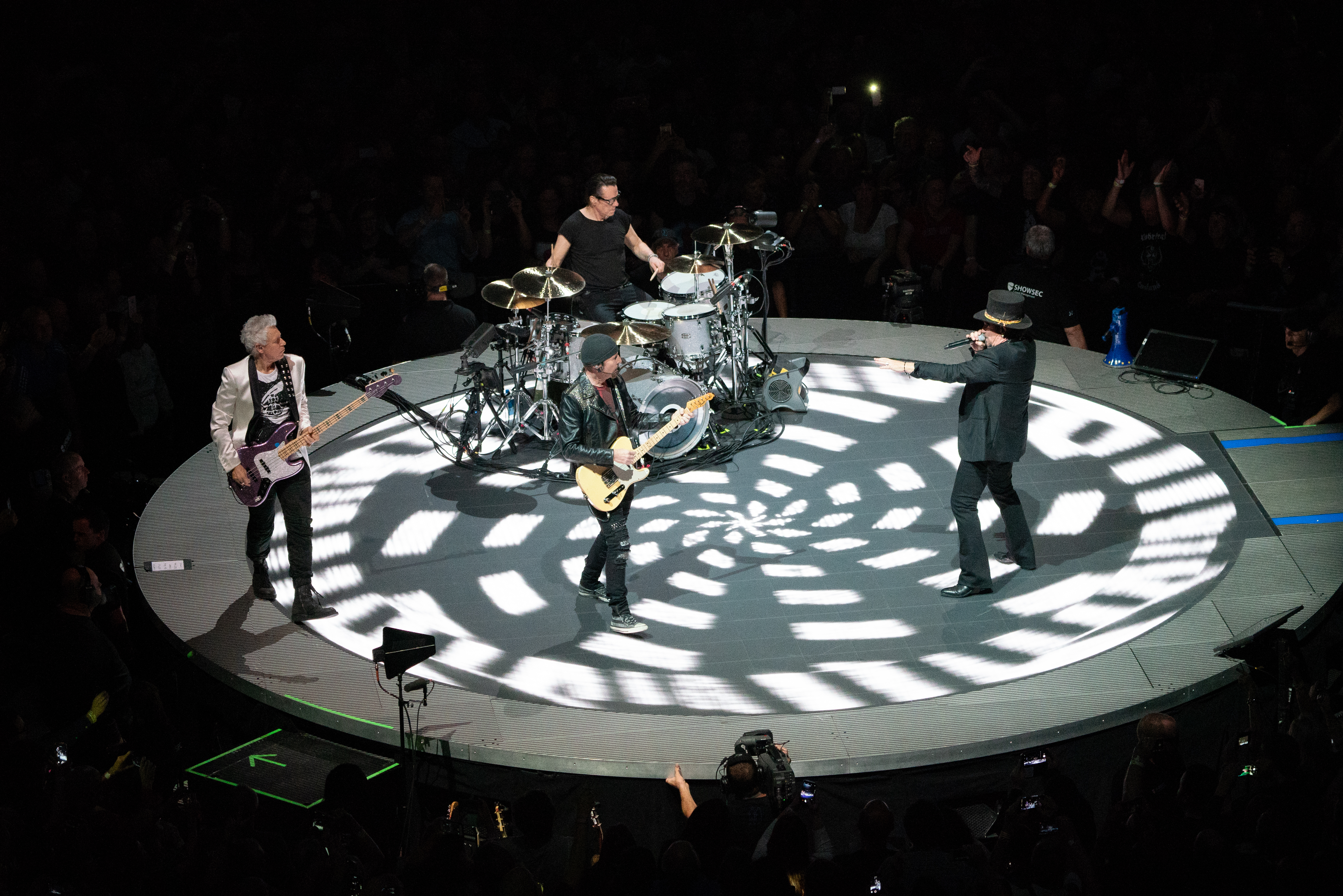
The B-stage was upgraded from U2's 2015 tour with a built-in LED display.

The B-stage at the end of walkway was upgraded from the 2015 tour to include high-definition LED displays in the floor. To accommodate the B-stage's round shape, PRG upgraded its Rolling Video Floor Riser product that had been unveiled in 2017. Each riser contained two ROE Visual Black Marble LED units with a 4 mm (0.16 in) pixel pitch. The risers had built-in magnets, allowing the tour crew to quickly set them up—1,076 sq ft (100 m^{2}) of flooring could be assembled in under 20 minutes. The risers were transported in custom 1.6-metre-tall (5.2 ft) dollies, enabling them to be shipped via air cargo for significant cost savings. Above the B-stage, an "automation grid" featured a Smart Winch and six Nav Hoists by Tait to vertically move props, such as an LED ring, a light bulb, and a mirror ball.

The AR segment of the show was viewed using the "U2 Experience" mobile app for iOS and Android devices, which overlaid computer generated imagery over footage captured by a phone's camera. The AR event was triggered by pointing the camera at the "barricage" video screens while they were displaying charcoal drawings. Fans can also trigger it by pointing their phone's camera at the Songs of Experience album cover. Long-time U2 stage designer Willie Williams collaborated with Nexus Studios on the AR technology and with Treatment Studio to design the 3D avatar of Bono. During the pre-show music, the AR experience saw "the stage recast as an enormous iceberg" that began to melt and flood the audience; the imagery was a precursor to the tsunami wave that displayed on the video screens during the final song of the show's first act, "Until the End of the World". For the opening song, "Love Is All We Have Left", the app displayed an avatar of Bono hovering above the audience, accompanying the real-life Bono as he performed the song. Williams justified the use of the phone in this way by saying, "If you're going to look at your phone we're going to give you something to look at that's part of the narrative rather than you just making a movie that nobody is ever going to watch."

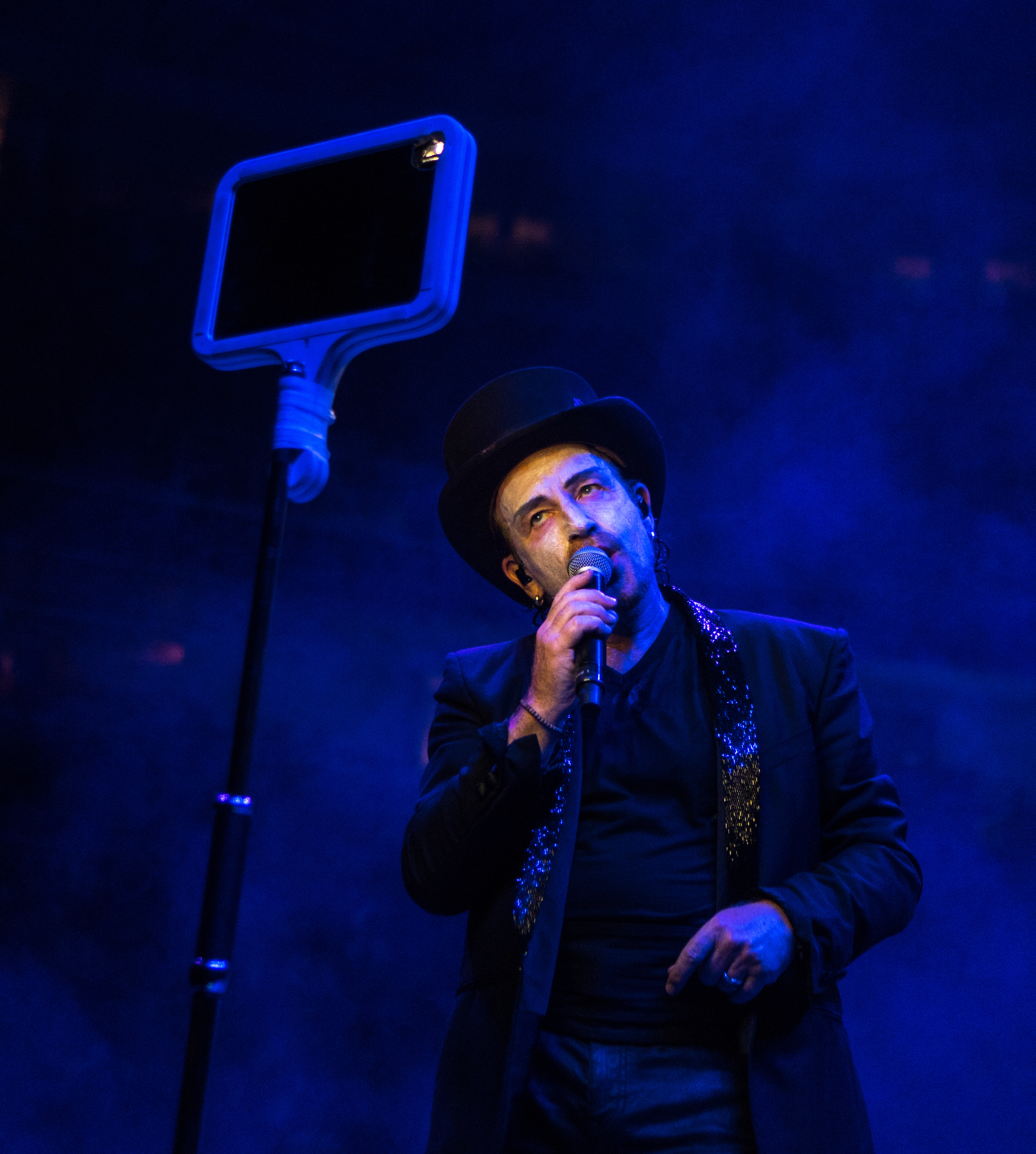
Bono portraying his stage character MacPhisto, whose facial image was applied on the video screens as an AR video filter

AR was further used during the concerts through a camera filter that helped Bono revive his old stage character "MacPhisto", a representation of the devil that he previously portrayed on the Zoo TV Tour in 1993. The filter, called the "MacPhisto Effect", was created by Marc Wakefield on the Facebook for Developers AR Studio platform, in collaboration with the tour architect Ric Lipson and his design studio Treatment Ltd. Wakefield drew the attention of U2's creative team after creating a popular "creepy clown" filter and receiving an invitation to Facebook's annual developers conference. He was tasked with taking the original design of MacPhisto from 1993 and imagining how 25 years of hard living would change his appearance. After several iterations and feedback provided by Bono, the resulting likeness featured sharper, more misshapen teeth, cracked and peeling skin, a beaten up top hat, a longer nose and chin, and a large blemish on his cheek. During testing, the filter occasionally disappeared, revealing Bono's face underneath, but rather than try to fix it, the creative team relented when they realised this gave the impression that "MacPhisto was fighting for control over Bono". The filter was made publicly available on the Facebook mobile app in July 2018.

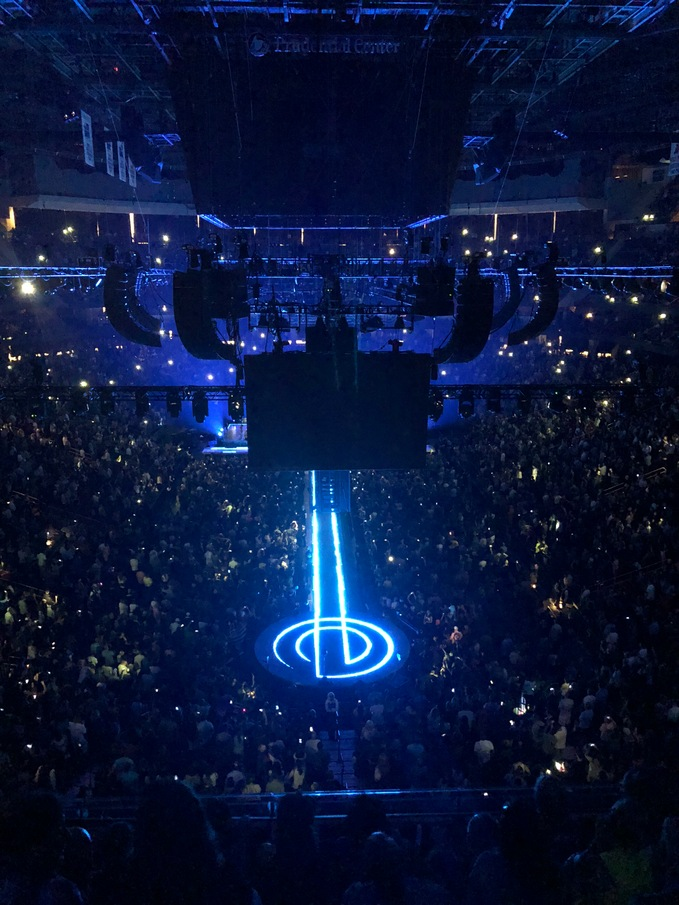
The sound system was hung from the venue ceilings and arranged in an oval following the perimeter of the venue floor.

Just as with the original tour, the omnidirectional nature of the production and the possibility of the band members being spread out during performances presented a challenge for the sound design. Ultimately, the sound engineers hung the sound system from the venue ceilings in an oval ring, placing 12 arrays of Clair Global Cohesion CO-12 loudspeakers around the perimeter of the venue floor, each alternating between left and right channels for full stereo sound. Additionally, eight arrays of Clair Cohesion CP-218 subwoofers, each comprising three speaker cabinets, were hung from the ring. Each cabinet was no more than 75 feet (23 m) from the audience. For downfill and centerfill sound to the general admission attendees, 32 Clair Cohesion CO-10 cabinets were suspended above the B-stage, walkway, and front of the main stage, while 18 Cohesion CO-8 cabinets were built into the walkway and stages. The levels of the speakers were time-aligned for optimal quality. In total, more than 200 loudspeakers were used. With the sound system designed to provide omnipresent audio, the front of house mixing station could be positioned nearly anywhere in the venue as long as it was equidistant between CO-12 arrays. During the tour, the station was usually positioned within the audience seating, from which sound engineer Joe O'Herlihy operated a DiGiCo SD7 digital mixing console, one of eight used by the production staff. The others were operated underneath the main stage; Alastair McMillan operated a mixing station for Bono, CJ Eriksson for Clayton and drummer Larry Mullen Jr., and Richard Rainey for the Edge.

The crew, consisting of 90 traveling members and 120 local labourers, could build the stage in about ten hours while disassembling it in four. In total, the equipment hung from the venue ceilings weighed 178,000 pounds (81,000 kg). The show traveled continentally in 27 trucks, and overseas required 37 maritime transport containers or four Boeing 747 freight airplanes to transport.

== Planning, itinerary, and ticketing ==
U2 officially announced the Experience + Innocence Tour and its North American dates on 1 November 2017, the same day they announced the release date for Songs of Experience. The band decided not to open the tour in a large market such as New York or Los Angeles but instead to do so somewhere where they would face less pressure. The band chose Oklahoma, where Donald Trump received 65.3% of the state's votes in the 2016 US election. The group were curious how their progressive messages would be received in a conservative part of the US.

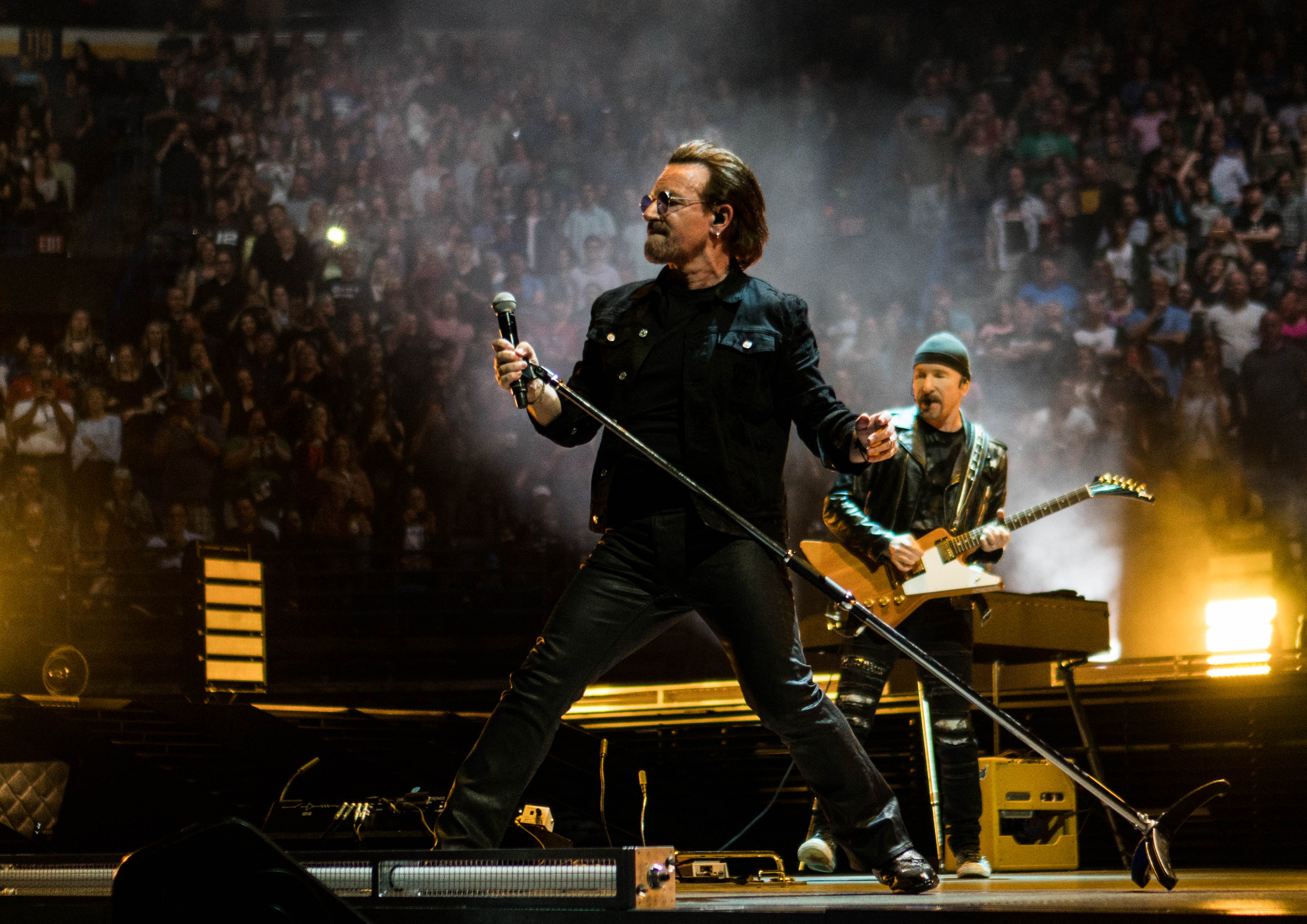
Bono and the Edge during a concert in St. Louis on 4 May 2018

The North American leg of the tour used Ticketmaster's "Verified Fan" platform for combating ticket reselling, making U2 the first group to do so for an entire arena tour leg. The platform requires fans to use their email address to register for a ticket sale weeks in advance, and then to use a code sent to them later to access the sale. Verified Fan's engine uses a "behavior predictor" to offer codes only to registrants it determines are likely to use the tickets rather than resell them. Subscribing members of U2.com's fan club were offered the first opportunity to purchase tickets for the North American dates during a presale from 14 to 16 November, with Verified Fan registration required by 12 November to participate. A special presale was offered to holders of Citi credit cards from 16 to 18 November, with registration required by 14 November. Public sales of tickets began on 20 November, with registration required by 18 November.

The first European dates were announced on 16 January 2018. U2.com subscribers were given the first opportunity to purchase tickets from 18 to 20 January, before public sales began on 26 January. Initial shows for Dublin and Belfast were announced on 29 January, with two additional Dublin concerts announced the following day. Ticket sales for these Irish dates began on 2 February. After the Belfast show sold out, a second date was added, tickets for which went on sale on 9 February.

Every ticket purchased for the North American leg also came bundled with a copy of Songs of Experience, which helped the album debut at number one on the US Billboard 200; it was the band's eighth number-one album in the US and made them the first group to attain number-one albums in the US in four consecutive decades—the 1980s, 1990s, 2000s, and 2010s.

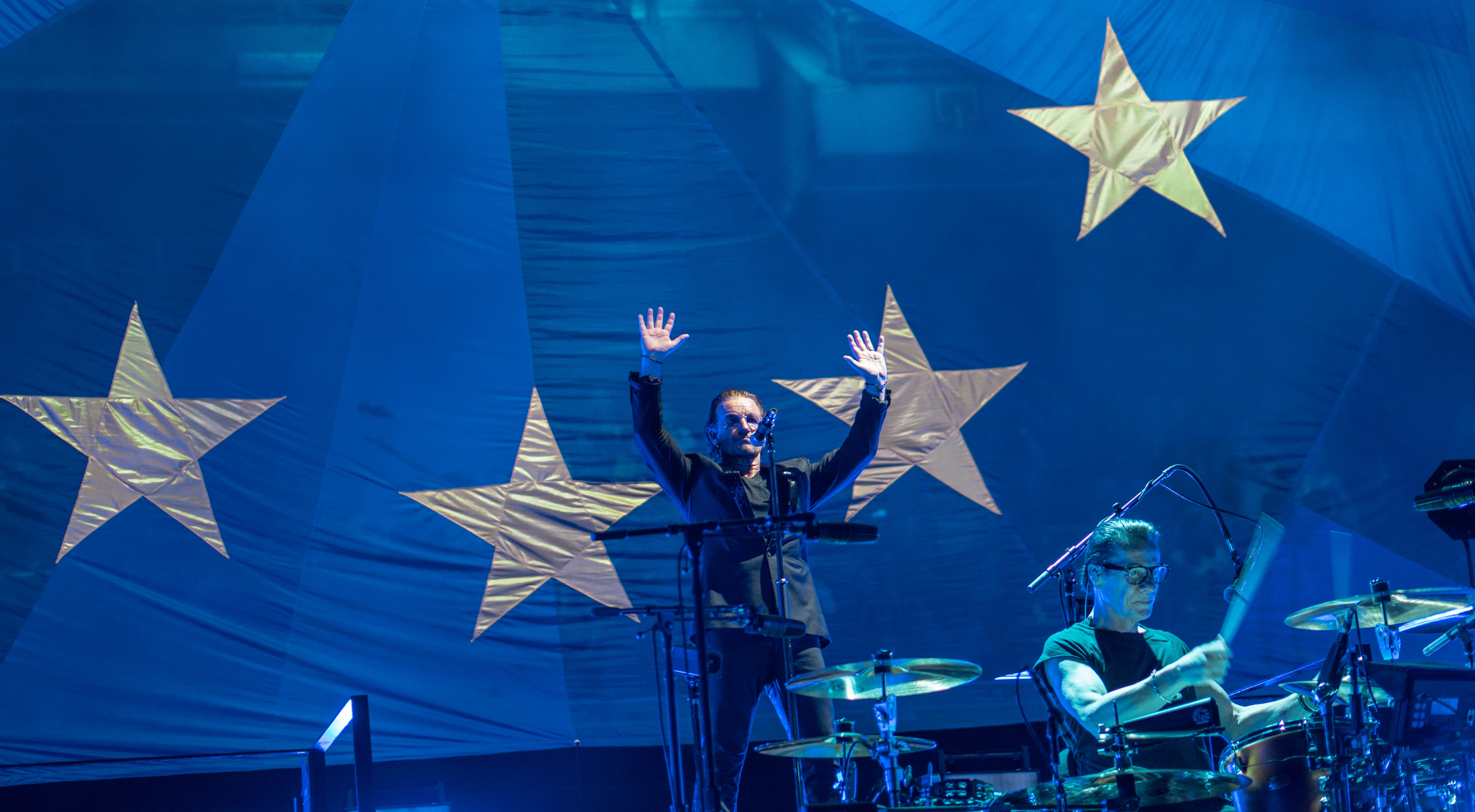
U2 performing in front of the flag of the European Union in Madrid on 21 September 2018

Leading up to the European leg of the tour, Bono wrote an op-ed for the German newspaper Frankfurter Allgemeine, in which he stated his support for the European Union and promised to fly its flag during the band's shows. Whereas most of the venues visited during the tour were sports arenas, the 3Arena in Dublin is designed as a theatre and is smaller in size, requiring the tour's production to be reconfigured to fit inside the venue. Consequently, the barricage was shortened and the B-stage was moved from the end of the dividing walkway to the centre of it.

The group's 1 September show in Berlin was prematurely ended after five songs due to Bono suffering a "complete loss of voice". After consulting a doctor, he said that they had ruled out any serious ailments and that he would be able to continue with the tour under proper care. A make-up concert was scheduled for 13 November, making it the final date of the European leg.

== Concert synopsis ==
Several political and social issues were discussed by Bono during the concerts, from racial issues to feminism. These issues were also addressed through the messages displayed on the video screens during the pre-show, such as "Don't shoot", "Herstory", "Refugees welcome", "Give peace a chance", "Vote", and "None of us are equal until all of us are equal".

Prior to the band taking the stage, "Winter Beats" by Swedish band I Break Horses was played as introduction music. After five shows, the song was replaced by "It's a Beautiful World" by Noel Gallagher's High Flying Birds for the rest of the tour. After the song was over, an introduction video featuring an MRI scan of a brain was shown as the voice of a nurse said, "Breathe in, exhale". On the European leg, the introduction video included footage of war-torn ruins of the European cities that the tour was visiting, interspersed with clips of Charlie Chaplin's character in the film The Great Dictator giving a speech at a mass rally about peace and tolerance.

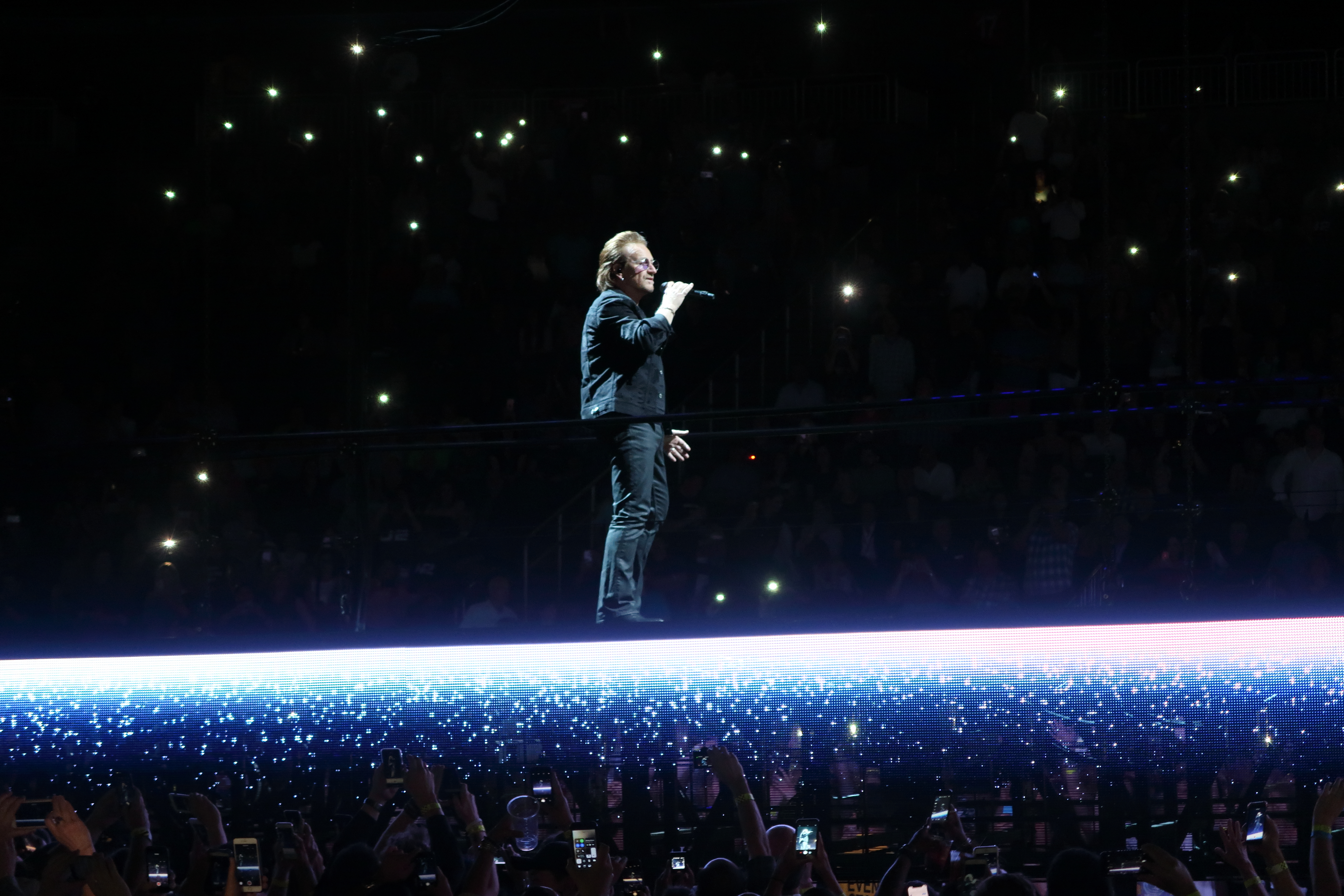
Bono standing atop an inclined "barricage" platform during a performance of "Lights of Home"

Each show on the North American leg opened with a trilogy of songs from Songs of Experience. For "Love Is All We Have Left", Bono performed on the "barricage" walkway by himself. During "The Blackout", the screens displayed silhouettes of the band members that Stereogum said resembled "characters in a horror movie trying to break free of a glass chamber". The images flickered and during the chorus revealed U2 inside the "barricage" performing the song. During "Lights of Home", Bono sang on the "barricage" walkway as it inclined and he reached for the titular lights. The visuals showed a custom particle map that morphed into a nighttime image of the city in which the concert was taking place. The images were captured from the International Space Station and provided by astronaut Tim Kopra, who personally shot many of them. For the European leg, "Love Is All We Have Left" and the accompanying AR segment were dropped from the opening sequence as a result of Treatment reworking the introduction video for Europe.

This sequence was followed by "I Will Follow" and then a slot for a rotating song, most often "Gloria", "All Because of You", or "Red Flag Day". After "Beautiful Day", the band performed "The Ocean", during which Bono introduced the show's narrative. For a majority of the tour, the remainder of the first act reprised the "Innocence suite" from the 2015 tour relatively faithfully: "Iris (Hold Me Close)" revisited the death of Bono's mother during his childhood; "Cedarwood Road" featured him performing inside the "barricage" amidst animated visuals of his childhood street; "Sunday Bloody Sunday" revisited the violence of the Troubles during the band members' youth; and "Until the End of the World" concluded the first act.

About midway through the European leg of the tour, U2 abandoned the "Innocence suite" and replaced it with a so-called "Berlin suite" of songs from their 1990s albums Achtung Baby and Zooropa. These tracks included "Zoo Station", "Stay (Faraway, So Close!)", "The Fly", and "Who's Gonna Ride Your Wild Horses". Williams explained that the "Berlin suite" originated after the rescheduling of the second Berlin show to the end of the tour. The band had been discussing which concert to film for the tour's video release and decided the rescheduled Berlin show would be optimal, since it would be the tour finale and in a city friendly to the band. However, they did not want to repeat the "Innocence suite" for a second video release, as it was already depicted in Innocence + Experience: Live in Paris. U2 instead chose a new segment of songs with the tour's end destination in mind.

During a brief intermission, St Francis Hotel's "Gotham Experience Remix" of U2's song "Hold Me, Thrill Me, Kiss Me, Kill Me" was played, featuring vocals from Gavin Friday and Arcade Fire's Régine Chassagne. It accompanied a comic book–style animated video that depicted the members of U2 evolving from innocence to experience through their encounters with a shadowy figure who presented a business card for "Wormwood & Macphisto Inc. Bespoke Atonement Services".

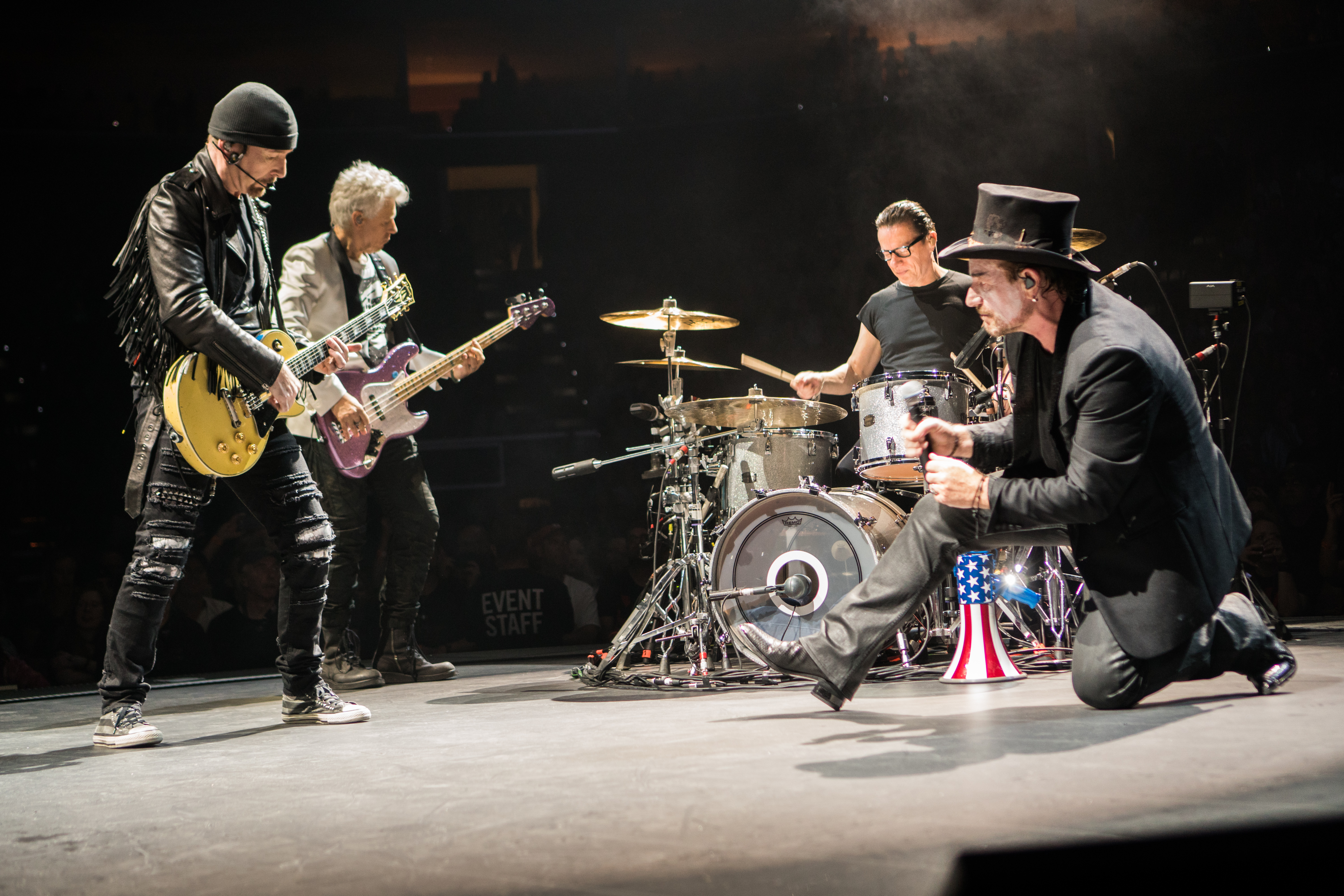
U2 performing on the B-stage during a show in Tulsa on 2 May 2018

U2 began the second act of the shows on the B-stage, with Bono wearing eye makeup and a top hat, a look that Q described as "part Mick Jagger in The Rolling Stones' Rock And Roll Circus; part the 'preacher stealing hearts at a travelling show'" described in U2's song "Desire". This segment began with performances of "Elevation", "Vertigo", and "Desire". Afterwards, Bono slipped into character as his devilish persona "MacPhisto". The character was depicted through a video filter applied to Bono's face on the video displayed on the screens. As MacPhisto, he commented on recent sociopolitical events and movements such as the Charlottesville rally by riffing on the lyrics from the Rolling Stones' song "Sympathy for the Devil". MacPhisto punctuated this monologue by saying, "when you don't believe that I exist, that's when I do my best work". This segued into a performance of the 1991 song "Acrobat", which the band had never performed live prior to the tour. Bassist Adam Clayton confirmed that part of the reason for finally playing the song was because devoted U2 fans had been requesting it. Critics noted the relevance of the song's opening lines "Don't believe what you hear/Don't believe what you see" in the post-truth world of the time.

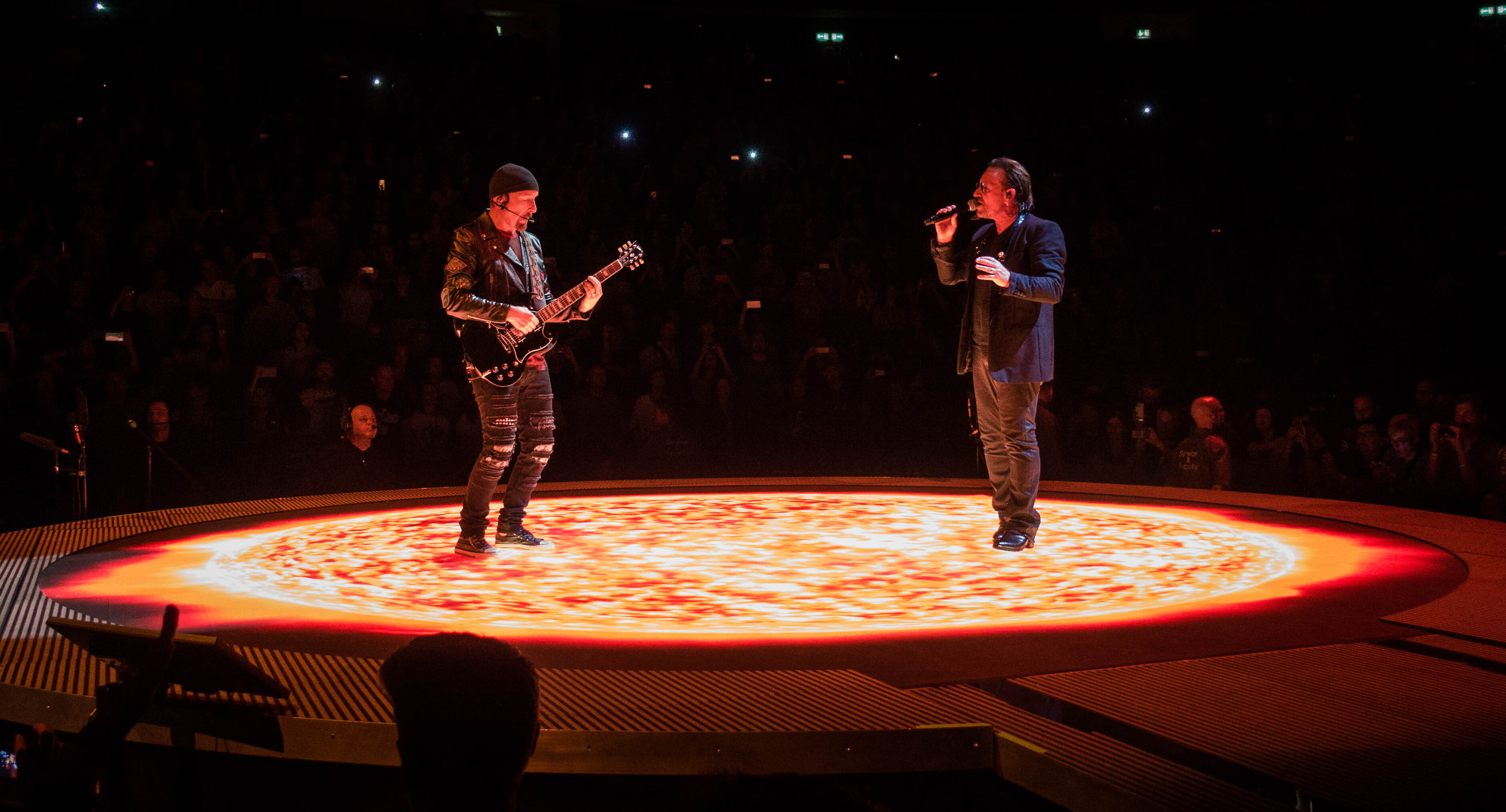
The Edge and Bono performing "Summer of Love" acoustically on the B-stage in Berlin in August 2018

The band then performed an acoustic version of "You're the Best Thing About Me". Bono and the Edge remained on the B-stage for an acoustic version of "Staring at the Sun". Bono introduced it as a song about "willful blindness", as footage of the Charlottesville rally and white nationalists marching is played. The main set of the concert concluded with "Pride (In the Name of Love)", "Get Out of Your Own Way", "American Soul", and "City of Blinding Lights".

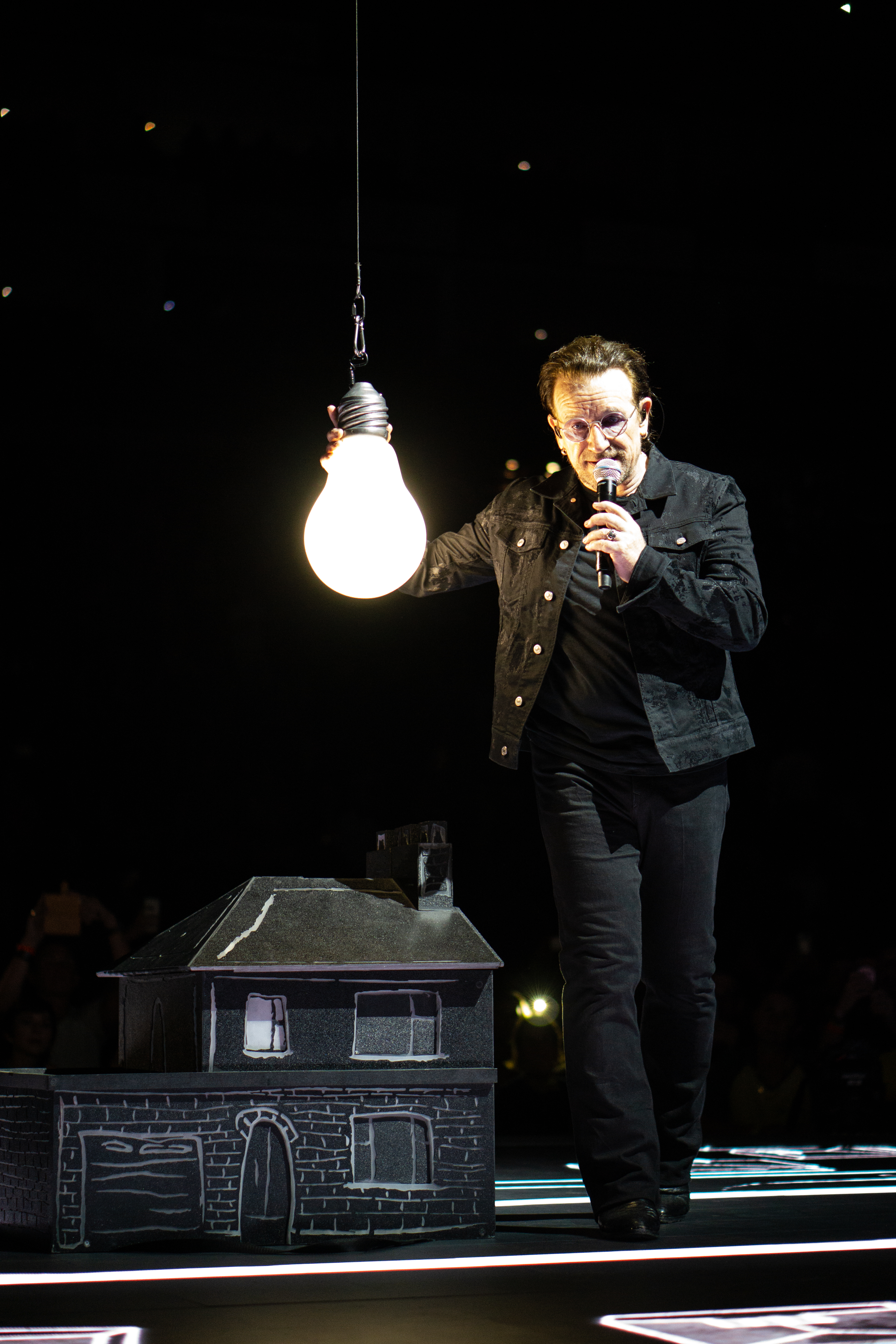
Bono opens a replica of his childhood home to reveal a light bulb during a performance of "13 (There Is a Light)"

Prior to the encore, a recording of the song "Women of the World" by Jim O'Rourke played, accompanied by images of the Edge's daughter, Sian. The segment was part of the #WomenOfTheWorldTakeOver social media campaign for the ONE Campaign, Bono's charitable organisation. The band returned for an encore of "One, "Love Is Bigger Than Anything in Its Way", and "13 (There Is a Light)". During the final song, Bono walked out to the B-stage and opened a small replica of his childhood home to reveal a hanging lightbulb that he swung around the venue. The lightbulb prop was previously used at the beginning of shows on the original Innocence + Experience Tour, bringing the two companion tours full circle.

Having played their 1987 album The Joshua Tree in its entirety at each show of the prior year's Joshua Tree Tour 2017, U2 decided not to play any songs from the album on the Experience + Innocence Tour. The Edge, Bono, and Williams had begun discussing set list ideas for this tour while still touring in 2017, and thought that by dropping songs that were staples of the group's live act, they would force themselves to take a fresh approach to structuring their shows. The Edge acknowledged the effect that omitting some of U2's most popular songs might have, saying the Experience + Innocence Tour was for "the more committed fans who really listen to everything and go to everything". Aside from The Joshua Tree, the tour was also noted to have omitted several of their earlier hits, with one critic noting that only five songs in the concert he attended were from the 1980s.

== Promotions, broadcasts, and releases ==
On 1 June 2018, Sirius XM Satellite Radio launched a limited-time U2-exclusive radio station called "The U2 Experience" on channel 30. It featured the band's music as well as interviews with the members. Initially intended to last until 30 June, the station was later extended through 31 July.

Sirius XM organised a contest in which the service's subscribers could win tickets to a special U2 concert at New York's Apollo Theater on 11 June 2018. The band were accompanied by the Sun Ra Arkestra for performances of "Angel of Harlem", "Desire", "When Love Comes to Town", and "Stuck in a Moment You Can't Get Out Of". For the latter song, Bono also paid tribute to the recently deceased celebrity chef Anthony Bourdain. The show was broadcast in North America on Sirius XM's U2 channel. A recording of the show was distributed on CD to subscribing members of U2.com in 2021.

Subscribers of U2.com for 2019 received an exclusive live album entitled Live Songs of iNNOCENCE + eXPERIENCE on double CD and via digital download. The record contained live renditions of 23 songs from the Songs of Innocence and Experience albums that were performed between 2015 and 2018.

The band were filmed for a concert video, eXPERIENCE + iNNOCENCE: Live in Berlin, during the 13 November 2018 show in Berlin that concluded the tour. A 75-minute cut of the concert was screened on New Year's Day 2020 on broadcast networks worldwide. The full concert was distributed on DVD to subscribing members of U2.com.

== Reception ==
=== Critical response ===
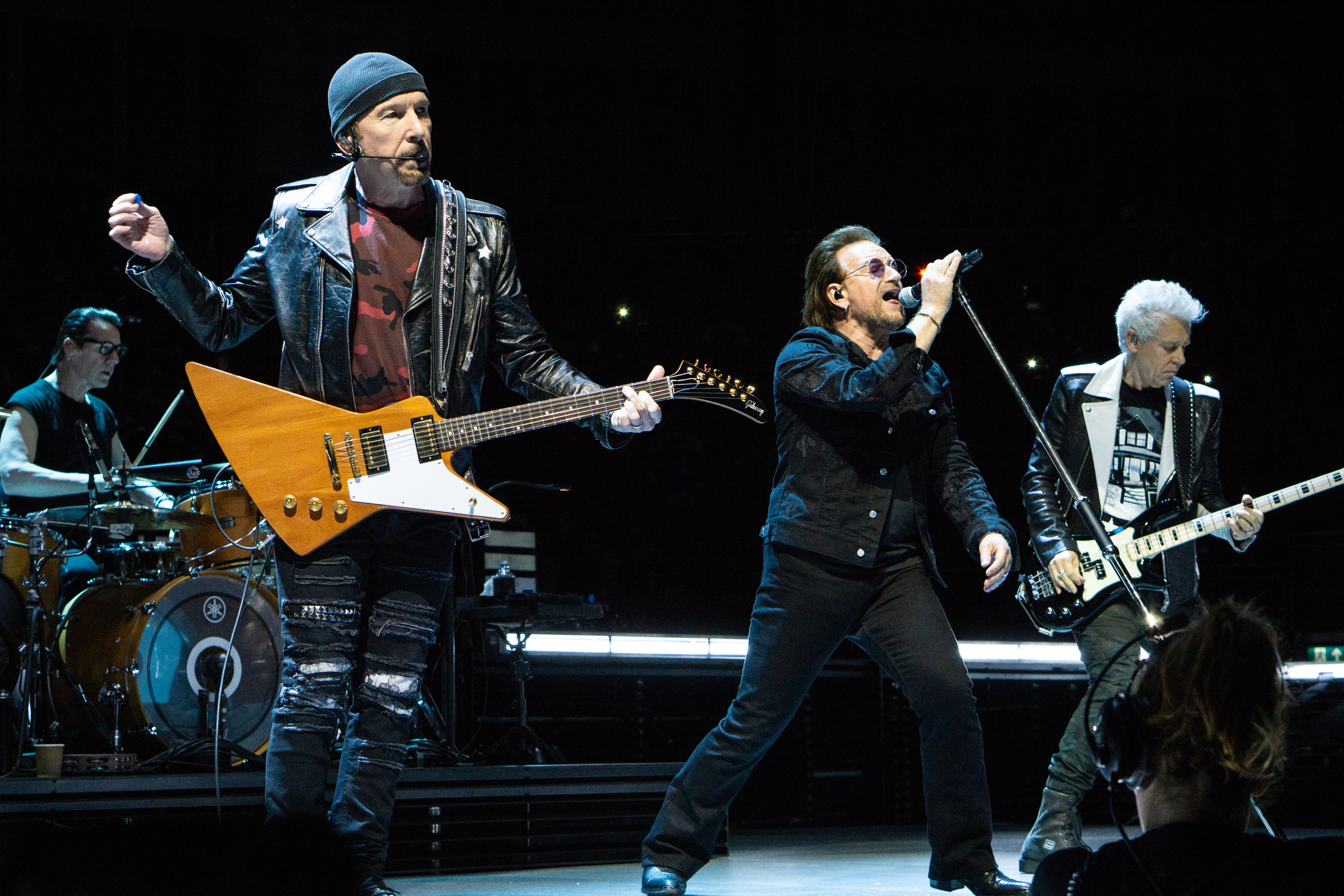
U2 performing in London on 24 October 2018

The tour received generally positive reviews, with critics praising both the staging and content of the tour. Jennifer O'Brien of The Times praised the group for delivering a message that espoused tolerance and denounced the political climate, and she thought the reliance on new material and absence of The Joshua Tree songs did not hurt the setlist. O'Brien said the group were "still at the top of their game, embracing state-of-the-art technologies and moving forward, a direction they clearly hope the US can go". Dave Egan in the Irish Independent called the opening night "One of the bravest, most powerful and even angriest performances U2 have ever done" and praised the reintroduction of MacPhisto after an absence of 25 years since Zoo TV. Reviewing the first show at the Forum, Roy Trakin in Variety said that "when it comes to performing live, the band remains the gold (and platinum) standard" and noted that U2 refused to rely on nostalgia, with almost half the set being taken from the last two albums. His review also said that the band were performing as a well-oiled machine despite being on the road for only two weeks at that point.

Greg Kot of the Chicago Tribune called one of their Chicago concerts "sometimes stupefying, sometimes riveting, and brimmed with ideas, if not always the most proficient means of realizing them", while singling out the quietest moments as the most resonant. Kot lauded the Innocence suite in the act's first half, as well as the "series of songs that savaged the reawakening of the white-supremacist movement in America", but said the latter was undercut by the performance of "American Soul", which he called U2's "clumsiest and least persuasive" political song. Nashville Scene said, "When it comes to matching musical themes with jaw-dropping visuals, U2 concerts are the Steven Spielberg films, the James Cameron epics, the Star Wars-sized events of rock." The publication praised the group for being "determined not to rest on its laurels", but judged that their emphasis on newer material towards the end of the show at the expense of well-known hits was the one flaw of the concert. Dan DeLuca of The Philadelphia Inquirer found the segment of the show that addressed the rise of white nationalism the most moving, believing it showed the U2 songs most relevant in 2018 were their older ones. He thought the use of their newer tracks to tell a coherent narrative worked "well enough" and closed by saying "U2 still delivers the goods and can be truly thrilling at times". Dave Simpson of The Guardian said, "It is also the most visually spectacular outing yet for a band who have previously toured with a mirrorball lemon and a giant claw". He judged that their social campaigning was more effective during this tour than in the past due to its relative subtlety. Simpson wrote, "It is not necessarily their best show... but it is certainly their most human."

=== Accolades ===
U2 received a nomination at the American Music Awards of 2018 for Tour of the Year. For the 30th Annual Pollstar Awards, the tour was nominated in the Major Tour of the Year and Best Rock Tour categories, while Jake Berry was nominated in the Road Warrior category. At the 2019 Billboard Music Awards, U2 were nominated for Top Rock Tour.

=== Commercial performance ===
According to Billboard, the North American leg of the tour grossed $61.5 million from 27 shows, with an average of $2.3 million per concert. U2's three shows at Madison Square Garden sold 55,575 tickets and grossed $8,705,673, while two shows at the Bell Centre in Montreal sold 42,974 tickets and grossed $4.58 million. The European leg of the tour grossed $64.7 million from 32 shows with box score data, with an average of $2 million per concert. In Paris, the tour's four concerts at AccorHotels Arena grossed $9,437,998 and sold 72,412 tickets, the highest gross of any market on the tour. The four shows at Milan's Mediolanum Forum grossed $7 million from 50,661 tickets sold, while the four-show run in the band's hometown of Dublin grossed $6.4 million from 46,529 tickets sold. In total, the tour grossed $126,188,344 from 923,733 tickets sold, with an average gross of $2,138,785 per concert, according to Billboard. During the magazine's reporting period from 1 November 2017 to 31 October 2018, U2 grossed $119,203,900, ranking the Experience + Innocence Tour as the top-grossing rock tour and the seventh-highest overall.

== Set list ==
These setlists were performed at the 25 June 2018 concert held at Madison Square Garden in New York City, and at the 10 November 2018 concert held at 3Arena in Dublin. It does not represent all shows throughout the tour.

North America

First act

1. "Love Is All We Have Left"
2. "The Blackout"
3. "Lights of Home"
4. "I Will Follow"
5. "All Because of You"
6. "Beautiful Day"
7. "The Ocean"
8. "Iris (Hold Me Close)"
9. "Cedarwood Road"
10. "Sunday Bloody Sunday"
11. "Until the End of the World"

Intermission

"Hold Me, Thrill Me, Kiss Me, Kill Me" (played over PA)

Second act

12. "Elevation"
13. "Vertigo"
14. "Desire"
15. "Acrobat"
16. "You're the Best Thing About Me"
17. "Staring at the Sun"
18. "Pride (In the Name of Love)"
19. "Get Out of Your Own Way"
20. "American Soul"
21. "City of Blinding Lights"

Intermission

"Women of the World" (played over PA)

Encore

22. "One"
23. "Love Is Bigger Than Anything in Its Way"
24. "13 (There Is a Light)"

Europe

First act

1. "The Blackout"
2. "Lights of Home"
3. "I Will Follow"
4. "Gloria"
5. "Beautiful Day"
6. "Dirty Day"
7. "Zoo Station"
8. "The Fly"
9. "Stay (Faraway, So Close!)"
10. "Who's Gonna Ride Your Wild Horses"

Intermission

"Hold Me, Thrill Me, Kiss Me, Kill Me" (played over PA)

Second act

11. "Elevation"
12. "Vertigo"
13. "Even Better Than the Real Thing"
14. "Acrobat"
15. "You're the Best Thing About Me"
16. "Summer of Love"
17. "Pride (In the Name of Love)"
18. "Get Out of Your Own Way"
19. "New Year's Day"
20. "City of Blinding Lights"

Intermission

"Women of the World" (played over PA)

Encore

21. "Landlady"
22. "One"
23. "Love Is Bigger Than Anything in Its Way"
24. "13 (There Is a Light)"

== Tour dates ==
Date	City	Country	Venue	Attendance	Gross
North America
2 May 2018	Tulsa	United States	BOK Center	16,570 / 16,570	$2,188,948
4 May 2018	St. Louis	United States	Scottrade Center	16,300 / 16,300	$2,001,462
7 May 2018	San Jose	United States	SAP Center	28,579 / 28,579	$3,703,304
8 May 2018	San Jose	United States	SAP Center	28,579 / 28,579	$3,703,304
11 May 2018	Las Vegas	United States	T-Mobile Arena	30,766 / 30,766	$5,104,662
12 May 2018	Las Vegas	United States	T-Mobile Arena	30,766 / 30,766	$5,104,662
15 May 2018	Inglewood	United States	The Forum	32,163 / 32,163	$4,432,426
16 May 2018	Inglewood	United States	The Forum	32,163 / 32,163	$4,432,426
19 May 2018	Omaha	United States	CenturyLink Center Omaha	14,742 / 14,742	$1,735,259
22 May 2018	Chicago	United States	United Center	32,463 / 32,463	$4,135,008
23 May 2018	Chicago	United States	United Center	32,463 / 32,463	$4,135,008
26 May 2018	Nashville	United States	Bridgestone Arena	16,717 / 16,717	$2,700,706
28 May 2018	Duluth	United States	Infinite Energy Arena	12,982 / 12,982	$2,420,795
5 June 2018	Montreal	Canada	Bell Centre	42,974 / 42,974	$4,580,121
6 June 2018	Montreal	Canada	Bell Centre	42,974 / 42,974	$4,580,121
9 June 2018	Uniondale	United States	NYCB Live: Home of the Nassau Veterans Memorial Coliseum	14,629 / 14,629	$2,260,713
13 June 2018	Philadelphia	United States	Wells Fargo Center	31,238 / 31,238	$3,549,210
14 June 2018	Philadelphia	United States	Wells Fargo Center	31,238 / 31,238	$3,549,210
17 June 2018	Washington, D.C.	United States	Capital One Arena	32,053 / 32,053	$4,319,994
18 June 2018	Washington, D.C.	United States	Capital One Arena	32,053 / 32,053	$4,319,994
21 June 2018	Boston	United States	TD Garden	35,139 / 35,139	$5,539,769
22 June 2018	Boston	United States	TD Garden	35,139 / 35,139	$5,539,769
25 June 2018	New York City	United States	Madison Square Garden	55,575 / 55,575 (Note: The score data for the shows held at Madison Square Garden in New York on 25–26 June and 1 July 2018 is available only as a three-show total.)	$8,705,673
26 June 2018	New York City	United States	Madison Square Garden	55,575 / 55,575	$8,705,673
29 June 2018	Newark	United States	Prudential Center	16,612 / 16,612	$2,523,388
1 July 2018	New York City	United States	Madison Square Garden	—	—
3 July 2018	Uncasville	United States	Mohegan Sun Arena	8,557 / 8,557	$1,594,446
Europe
31 August 2018	Berlin	Germany	Mercedes-Benz Arena	29,260 / 29,260	$3,844,620
1 September 2018 (Note: The 1 September show was prematurely ended after Bono suffered vocal difficulties, resulting in a 13 November make-up date being added.)	Berlin	Germany	Mercedes-Benz Arena	29,260 / 29,260	$3,844,620
4 September 2018	Cologne	Germany	Lanxess Arena	34,844 / 34,844	$4,423,431
5 September 2018	Cologne	Germany	Lanxess Arena	34,844 / 34,844	$4,423,431
8 September 2018	Paris	France	AccorHotels Arena	72,412 / 72,412	$9,421,781
9 September 2018	Paris	France	AccorHotels Arena	72,412 / 72,412	$9,421,781
12 September 2018	Paris	France	AccorHotels Arena	72,412 / 72,412	$9,421,781
13 September 2018	Paris	France	AccorHotels Arena	72,412 / 72,412	$9,421,781
16 September 2018	Lisbon	Portugal	Altice Arena	37,518 / 37,518	$4,279,811
17 September 2018	Lisbon	Portugal	Altice Arena	37,518 / 37,518	$4,279,811
20 September 2018	Madrid	Spain	WiZink Center	30,248 / 30,248	$3,888,306
21 September 2018	Madrid	Spain	WiZink Center	30,248 / 30,248	$3,888,306
29 September 2018	Copenhagen	Denmark	Royal Arena	31,012 / 31,012	$4,219,513
30 September 2018	Copenhagen	Denmark	Royal Arena	31,012 / 31,012	$4,219,513
3 October 2018	Hamburg	Germany	Barclaycard Arena	27,190 / 27,190	$3,568,595
4 October 2018	Hamburg	Germany	Barclaycard Arena	27,190 / 27,190	$3,568,595
7 October 2018	Amsterdam	Netherlands	Ziggo Dome	33,542 / 33,542	$4,300,638
8 October 2018	Amsterdam	Netherlands	Ziggo Dome	33,542 / 33,542	$4,300,638
11 October 2018	Milan	Italy	Mediolanum Forum	50,660 / 50,660	$7,051,462
12 October 2018	Milan	Italy	Mediolanum Forum	50,660 / 50,660	$7,051,462
15 October 2018	Milan	Italy	Mediolanum Forum	50,660 / 50,660	$7,051,462
16 October 2018	Milan	Italy	Mediolanum Forum	50,660 / 50,660	$7,051,462
19 October 2018	Manchester	England	Manchester Arena	36,850 / 36,850	$4,923,501
20 October 2018	Manchester	England	Manchester Arena	36,850 / 36,850	$4,923,501
23 October 2018	London	England	The O_{2} Arena	36,632 / 36,632	$5,255,512
24 October 2018	London	England	The O_{2} Arena	36,632 / 36,632	$5,255,512
27 October 2018	Belfast	Northern Ireland	SSE Arena	18,996 / 18,996	$2,521,846
28 October 2018	Belfast	Northern Ireland	SSE Arena	18,996 / 18,996	$2,521,846
5 November 2018	Dublin	Ireland	3Arena	46,529 / 46,529	$6,405,471
6 November 2018	Dublin	Ireland	3Arena	46,529 / 46,529	$6,405,471
9 November 2018	Dublin	Ireland	3Arena	46,529 / 46,529	$6,405,471
10 November 2018	Dublin	Ireland	3Arena	46,529 / 46,529	$6,405,471
13 November 2018	Berlin	Germany	Mercedes-Benz Arena	—N/a	—N/a
Total				923,733 / 923,733	$126,223,605
