= The Blackout (U2 song) =

2017 single by U2

Single by U2

from the album Songs of Experience
- Released: 24 November 2017
- Genre: Alternative rock, dance-rock
- Length: 4:45 (album version); 7:18 (Jacknife Lee Remix)
- Label: Island
- Composer: U2
- Lyricist: Bono
- Producers: Jacknife Lee; Ryan Tedder (original), Brent Kutzle (additional)

U2 singles chronology
"You're the Best Thing About Me" (2017)	"The Blackout" (2017)	"Get Out of Your Own Way" (2017)

"The Blackout" is a song by the Irish rock band U2 from their fourteenth studio album, Songs of Experience (2017). The song was first unveiled on 30 August 2017 through a performance video, ahead of the album's release. It was subsequently issued as a limited-edition 12-inch vinyl single on 24 November 2017 for Record Store Day Black Friday, through Island Records and Third Man Records. The release featured the album version of the song and an exclusive remix by Jacknife Lee.

== Composition ==
The song combines distorted guitars with a bassy, danceable groove, a result that The Telegraph said recalled the "audacious cyberpunk energy of Achtung Baby". The lyrics, written by U2's lead vocalist Bono, ruminate on the state of democracy as well as his mortality, mentioning natural disasters and extinction events in lines such as "Dinosaur wonders why it still walks the earth / A meteor promises it's not gonna hurt".

== Release ==
"The Blackout" was introduced during the promotional campaign for U2's 2017 album Songs of Experience. On 21 August 2017, several U2 fans in the United States received cryptic letters via postal mail teasing a new release from the band. The letters contained text mentioning William Blake's Songs of Innocence and of Experience, with a silhouette of Bono's son and the Edge's daughter from the album cover blocking out most of the text except for a few words, revealing a message taken from lyrics to "The Blackout": "Blackout ... It's ... clear ... who ... you are ... will ... appear ... U2.com". The bottom of the letters said "U2 will announce" but blacked out the release title and date. Many of the recipients of the letter were in the path of that day's solar eclipse. On 30 August, after posting a teaser online the day prior, the band unveiled a video on Facebook Live showing a live performance of "The Blackout". The video was part of a strategy to energise U2's core fans on social media by reaching them with new music first. "The Blackout" video was viewed more than 2 million times in 24 hours and 11 million in over a week.

The album version of the song was released on streaming services on 1 November. This was accompanied by the band officially announcing details of the album's release, releasing the song "Get Out of Your Own Way", and announcing dates for the North American leg of the 2018 Experience + Innocence Tour.

=== Record Store Day release ===
On 26 October 2017, Third Man Records announced a limited-edition 12-inch vinyl release of "The Blackout" in collaboration with Island Records. The single was scheduled for release on 24 November as part of Record Store Day's Black Friday event. It was the first physical release of music from Songs of Experience, which was subsequently released on 1 December 2017. The 12-inch single was manufactured at Third Man Pressing in Detroit, Michigan, and distributed through Third Man Records and Island Records. The record contained the original album version of "The Blackout" on its A-side and an exclusive remix by producer Jacknife Lee on its B-side.

Two vinyl variants were produced. The standard edition was pressed on black vinyl and distributed to participating Record Store Day retailers. A more limited black-and-white vinyl edition was sold through selected outlets, including Third Man Records stores in Nashville, Tennessee, and Detroit, as well as participating retailers in the United Kingdom and Ireland.

The release was restricted to a single pressing. Of the approximately 20,000 copies produced worldwide, 19,250 were standard black vinyl records and 750 were limited black-and-white copies.

The special edition was sold at Third Man Records locations in Nashville and Detroit, Rough Trade in London, and Freebird Records in Dublin. The records were packaged in a black die-cut sleeve, with the limited version featuring a white pattern on the vinyl resembling an eclipse.

== Music video ==
The performance video for "The Blackout" was directed by Richie Smyth and filmed on 28 July 2017 at the WesterUnie venue in Amsterdam, the Netherlands, during the European leg of The Joshua Tree Tour 2017. The filming took place before an invited audience of approximately 300 fans, some of whom had gained admission through a competition organized by U2's official website.

The video shows the band performing the song in an intimate concert setting, contrasting with the stadium performances of the Joshua Tree anniversary tour. The footage was filmed using multiple cameras positioned throughout the venue.

The video premiered on 30 August 2017 through U2's official Facebook page. It was subsequently made available through YouTube and Vevo on 13 November 2017.

== Live performances ==
The visuals during a performance of "The Blackout"

"The Blackout" became a regular part of U2's setlists during the Experience + Innocence Tour in 2018, which supported Songs of Experience. The song was performed throughout the tour, including its European leg.

A live recording of the song from a 2018 performance in Belfast was included on the fan-club compilation Live Songs of Innocence + Experience. Another performance appeared in the concert film Experience + Innocence: Live in Berlin, documenting the tour's final concert.

== Commercial performance ==
"The Blackout" reached number two on both the UK Official Physical Singles Chart and the UK Official Vinyl Singles Chart. It also peaked at number 52 on the UK Official Singles Sales Chart.

The single ranked 17th on the Official Charts Company's list of the 40 best-selling vinyl singles of 2017 in the United Kingdom.

== Track listing ==
12-inch vinyl single
No.	Title	Length
1.	"The Blackout"	4:43
2.	"The Blackout (Jacknife Lee Remix)"	7:18
Total length:		12:01

== Charts ==
Chart (2017)	Peak position
UK Singles Sales (OCC)	52
UK Physical Singles (OCC)	2
UK Vinyl Singles (OCC)	2

== Release history ==
Region	Date	Format	Label
Worldwide	24 November 2017	12-inch vinyl	Third Man Records, Island Records
