= Songs of Experience (U2 album) =

Studio album by U2
- Released: 1 December 2017
- Recorded: 2014–2017
- Studios: Electric Lady (New York City); The Garage (Topanga, California); Shangri-La (Los Angeles); Strathmore House (Killiney); Neptune Valley (Los Angeles); Hanover Quay (Dublin); Windmill Lane (Dublin); The Woodshed (Los Angeles); Uno Mas (Brentwood, Tennessee); Waterloo (Los Angeles); The Church (London)
- Genre: Pop rock
- Length: 51:07
- Labels: Interscope; Island; Universal Canada
- Producers: Jacknife Lee; Ryan Tedder; Steve Lillywhite (add.); Andy Barlow (add.); Jolyon Thomas (add.); Brent Kutzle (add.); Paul Epworth (add.); Danger Mouse (add.); Declan Gaffney (add.)

U2 chronology
Innocence + Experience: Live in Paris (2016)	Songs of Experience (2017)	Songs of Surrender (2023)

Singles from Songs of Experience
- 1. "You're the Best Thing About Me" Released: 6 September 2017; 2. "Get Out of Your Own Way" Released: 16 January 2018; 3. "Love Is Bigger Than Anything in Its Way" Released: 23 April 2018; 4. "Summer of Love" Released: 10 August 2018; 5. "Landlady" Released: 19 October 2018

Songs of Experience is the fourteenth studio album by Irish rock band U2. Released on 1 December 2017, it was produced by Jacknife Lee and Ryan Tedder with Steve Lillywhite, Andy Barlow, Jolyon Thomas, Brent Kutzle, Paul Epworth, Danger Mouse, and Declan Gaffney. The album is intended to be a companion piece to U2's previous record, Songs of Innocence (2014). Whereas its predecessor explored the group members' adolescence in Ireland in the 1970s, Songs of Experience thematically is a collection of letters written by lead vocalist Bono to people and places closest to his heart. The album features guest appearances from several musical acts, including Haim, Kendrick Lamar, and Lady Gaga.

Songs of Experience was first conceived during the Songs of Innocence sessions and initially started with Bono writing songs while recuperating from a serious November 2014 bicycle accident. U2 began work on the album in earnest during the 2015 Innocence + Experience Tour, with the band members individually collaborating with the producers while on the road. The sessions continued into 2016 and mostly wrapped up by the end of the year. The group had planned to release the album in the fourth quarter, but after the shift of global politics in a conservative direction, highlighted by the UK's Brexit referendum and the 2016 US presidential election, they chose to put the record on hold and reassess its tone. With the extra time, U2 re-recorded many of the songs as a group while remixing and exploring different production techniques. Bono rewrote his lyrics to reflect the political climate as well as his "brush with mortality" after undergoing open-heart surgery in December 2016. The album was ultimately completed during the Joshua Tree Tour 2017.

Compared to Songs of Innocence's pervasive no-cost release through the iTunes Store, promotion for Songs of Experience was more traditional and understated. Several postal letters were mailed to fans to tease the album, while exclusive content was produced for digital platforms such as Amazon Music, Spotify, and Apple Music. Numerous promotional singles and remixes of tracks were released, including the lead single "You're the Best Thing About Me". The album received generally mixed reviews from critics, many of whom believed it trod old ground for the band. Due in part to bundling with ticket purchases for the 2018 Experience + Innocence Tour, the album debuted at number one in the United States, making U2 the first group to top the country's chart in four consecutive decades. In the United Kingdom, it peaked at number five. Songs of Experience was the sixth-best-selling album globally in 2017, selling 1.3 million copies. U2 supported the album with the Experience + Innocence Tour, a sequel to their 2015 tour.

== Background ==
On 9 September 2014, U2 announced their thirteenth studio album, Songs of Innocence, at an Apple product launch event, and released it digitally the same day to all iTunes Store customers at no cost. The release made the album available to over 500 million iTunes customers in what Apple CEO Tim Cook called "the largest album release of all time." Apple reportedly paid Universal Music Group and U2 a lump sum for a five-week exclusivity period in which to distribute the album and spent US$100 million on a promotional campaign. Produced by Danger Mouse with Paul Epworth, Ryan Tedder, Declan Gaffney, and Flood, Songs of Innocence recalls the group members' youth in Ireland, touching on childhood experiences, loves and losses, while paying tribute to their musical inspirations. Lead vocalist Bono described it as "the most personal album we've written". The record received mixed reviews and drew criticism for its digital release strategy; it was automatically added to users' iTunes libraries, which, for many, triggered an unprompted download to their electronic devices. Chris Richards of The Washington Post called the release "rock-and-roll as dystopian junk mail". Within a few hours of Songs of Innocence's release, Bono posted a note on U2's website indicating a companion release would follow: "If you like Songs of Innocence, stay with us for Songs of Experience. It should be ready soon enough... although I know I've said that before."

U2 embarked on the Innocence + Experience Tour in May 2015, visiting arenas in North America and Europe from May through December. The band originally began the tour with the intent to stage it in two phases, one with material primarily taken from Songs of Innocence and one with material that would eventually be from Songs of Experience. The group structured their concerts around a loose autobiographical narrative of "innocence" passing into "experience", with a fixed set of songs for the first half of each show and a varying second half, separated by an intermission—a first for U2 concerts. The stage spanned the length of the venue floor and comprised three sections: a rectangular main stage, a smaller circular B-stage, and a connecting walkway. The centerpiece of the set was a 96-foot-long (29 m) double-sided video screen that featured an interior catwalk, allowing the band members to perform amidst the video projections. U2's sound system was moved to the venue ceilings and arranged in an oval array, in hopes of improving acoustics by evenly distributing sound throughout the arena. In total, the tour grossed US$152.2 million from 1.29 million tickets sold.

== Writing and recording ==
According to guitarist the Edge, the band realised early during the Songs of Innocence sessions that they were working on what would become two separate albums. In a 12 October 2014 interview with The Observer, Bono recited lyrics to an in-progress song called "The Morning After Innocence" (which later became "The Little Things That Give You Away"), in which the song's protagonist asks his younger self for help.

On 16 November 2014, Bono was injured in a "high energy bicycle accident" in Central Park in New York City. He suffered fractures of his shoulder blade, humerus, orbit, and pinky finger, requiring five hours of surgery at NewYork–Presbyterian Hospital/Weill Cornell Medical Center's Emergency Department. Bono said he was uncertain that he would ever be able to play guitar again. During his recuperation, he wrote new songs, sometimes using another guitarist to play chords he was unable to. Bono said his accident benefited Songs of Experience, explaining, "The gift of it was that I had time to write while in the mentality that you get to at the end of an album," referring to the period following the completion of Songs of Innocence. The Edge said, "At the very end of an album you're at the height of your powers in terms of writing, arranging and performing. It's a shame that you have to stop then and start the other phase of what we do, which is playing live. This time we haven't really stopped. Bono is trying to capitalize on that momentum and that sharpness."

While touring in Russia with his electronic music duo Lamb, musician Andy Barlow received an offer to produce for U2. The following week, he flew to Monaco to join the group for what he described as a "two-week tryout". Barlow was surprised by how receptive the band members were to his ideas and how quickly they trusted him, particularly Bono. One of the first tasks that Barlow was given was helping the band advance "The Little Things That You Give You Away" past the idea stage, something that numerous producers before him had failed to do. After the session in Monaco, Barlow was asked to join the group in Vancouver for six weeks from April–May 2015 for another trial period as they rehearsed for the Innocence + Experience Tour at the Pacific Coliseum. Producer Jolyon Thomas also joined them as the band used a mobile recording studio. Among the in-progress songs previewed to The New York Times during rehearsals were "Red Flag Day", "Civilisation", and "Instrument Flying". Prior to the tour's opening show on 14 May, the Edge speculated that the band could complete the album by the end of the year if they committed themselves during their limited downtime after the tour. Comparing the group's in-progress material to their 1993 album Zooropa, which was recorded between legs of their Zoo TV Tour, the Edge said the Songs of Experience songs were "a lot more developed".

After his time with U2 in Vancouver, Barlow was officially given the job of producer. The group continued to work on the album in their free time on the Innocence + Experience Tour. Whereas Bono usually favoured waiting until the conclusion of a tour to work on an album, this time he wanted to write and record in small increments on the road; he theorised that by doing this, they would already have "the shape and feel" of the album when it came time to dedicate themselves to completing it, thereby reducing the pressure they faced. Barlow mostly collaborated with the band members individually for minutes at a time due to their schedules and because the size of the dressing rooms on tour did not afford the band enough space to work together. The producer described the process as "piecing individual pieces of a jigsaw puzzle". Ultimately, Barlow spent two years working with U2 in approximately ten countries, sometimes for months at a time. By his estimation, only 10 percent of his work took place in actual recording studios—most of it was done in dressing rooms, hotel rooms, and mansions.

Through October 2015, the band had written approximately 18 songs, from which they planned to select 12. Around this time, the Edge wrote a new song provisionally titled "Tightrope". A cover story in Q that month also mentioned the tracks "Much More Better" and "The Little Things That Give You Away". In November 2015, the Edge told Hot Press that the group hoped to complete the album in early 2016 and release it by the end of that year.

After finishing the Innocence + Experience Tour in December 2015, the band dedicated themselves to working on Songs of Experience throughout 2016. The group convened with Barlow in Los Angeles at the recording studio of producer Rick Rubin, marking their first opportunity to record together as a group for the album, aside from time spent together in Dublin during the tour. In a February 2016 issue of Q, the Edge estimated that their existing songs could be completed in four-to-six weeks but said that they needed to write additional material. In the story, Bono discussed two new songs, "Landlady" and "Where the Shadows Fall". In March, the group worked on the record with Thomas in a rented Victorian mansion in Killiney, an affluent seaside suburb of Dublin. They outfitted the house with a makeshift recording studio and jammed in the parlour overlooking the bay. Mullen used a second drum kit positioned in an echoing stairwell.

However, while working on the album in Los Angeles late that month, the Edge indicated that it was not near completion: "It's really hard to say at this point when it will be done. We're definitely still in the weeds here. We're not booking the pressing plant, so to speak, just yet." He said that he had worked on 50 pieces of music individually, 20 of which the group were excited to pursue. He further added, "We are trying to really be brutal with the material and only focus on the things that we're really convinced are the best ideas. I would say we're now at the point of starting to really edit down to the core collection of songs that will make the record. Things are still in their rough state, but sounding really great." The guitarist said that "80 percent of [the record] was started before 2016, but most of it was written in the early part of 2016".

In May, musician Ryan Tedder, reprising his role as co-producer of Songs of Innocence, said, "I've never seen them this focused," while describing their in-progress material as their most exciting since 2000's All That You Can't Leave Behind. Tedder also mentioned that the album was mostly new material and that only one or two songs from the Innocence sessions had survived. The following month, the Edge said the band were "busting [their] ass" to release the album by the end of 2016.

While attending a wedding in Valencia in August 2016, the band spoke to fans about the album's progress; bassist Adam Clayton told fans to expect something within six months, while Bono, when asked about the Innocence + Experience Tour, said, "the second part of the tour is for 2017. You might see a few things in September or October though." The Irish Times picked up on these comments and reported that an album launch in September or October 2016 was possible to coincide with the band's 40th anniversary, and that the Innocence + Experience Tour would resume in March 2017. At the end of August, a new U2 song, "You're the Best Thing About Me", debuted in the form of an electronic dance remix by Norwegian DJ Kygo during his performance at the Cloud 9 Festival.

=== Delay and rework ===
The group had planned to release Songs of Experience in the fourth quarter of 2016, but they ultimately decided to delay it. After the shift of global politics in a conservative direction, highlighted by the UK's Brexit referendum and the 2016 US presidential election, the band wanted to reassess the tone of the album. The Edge said, "we suddenly realized that the world we were about to release it into had changed. So we gave ourselves a moment to reflect if this was a good idea, and concluded it might be better to wait for a minute. To pause, see what was going on in the world, see if the album we had just finished was what we wanted to say." Bono said, "It is a very personal album, and it's not gonna become a political album overnight. But it has to now go through the filter of what's happened in the rest of the world." According to the Edge, most of the resulting changes to the songs were lyrical and some were very subtle, emphasising or better expressing an idea. Barlow indicated that the band also dropped some songs from the album while writing a few new ones.

U2 were interested in exploring different production techniques and arrangements for their songs. Clayton said they wanted to tweak the mixes after the group's dissatisfaction with those from Songs of Innocence: "There wasn't clarity to some of the mixes and we needed to be a little bit more inventive sonically. I mean, that record, when we performed it live, the songs became very, very masculine and very tough and we didn't really capture that on the record." Bono echoed these sentiments, saying that Songs of Innocence lacked "coherence in production". As a result, in autumn 2016, the Edge, Clayton, and Mullen (and Bono for the final few days) convened in a rehearsal space to perform the songs together "with half an eye and ear to how they might be performed in a live concert setting". The group were hoping to find arrangements that would work live and on record, so as to avoid their habit of recording, releasing, and ultimately rearranging songs when preparing for a tour.

In an interview with Charlie Rose in September, Bono affirmed a tour would take place in 2017 but was non-committal on a release date for the album. In October 2016, Tedder mentioned that he had been working with U2 on the record for a year, and said that there would be "really good remixes that are going to kick an entirely new door wide open for U2 fans". In a video released on Christmas in December, the band announced that Songs of Experience would be released in 2017.

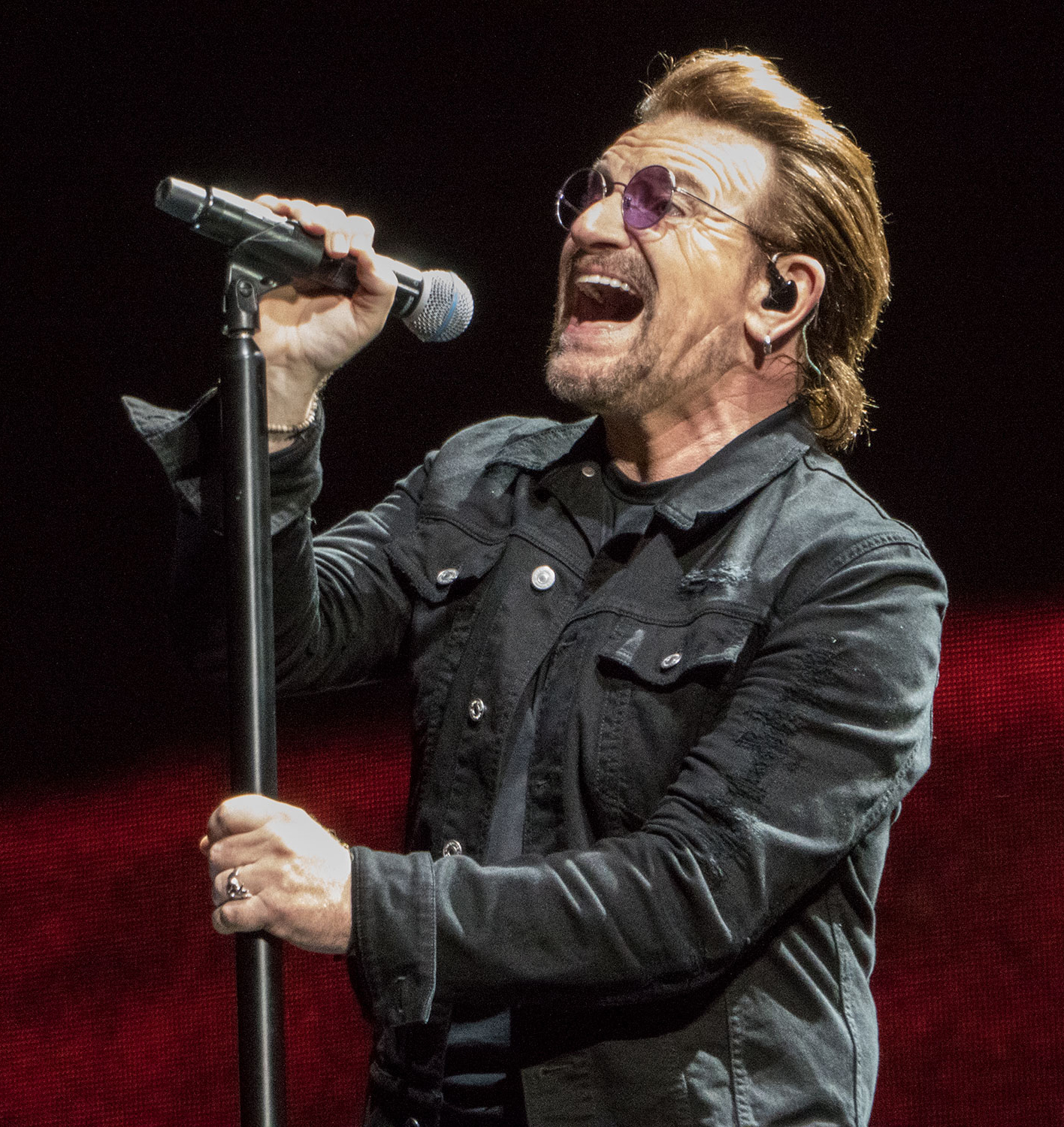
Lead singer Bono underwent open-heart surgery in December 2016, which affected the album's lyrical direction.

The Irish Times reported that sometime in late 2016 between Christmas and New Year's Day, Bono had a near-death experience. At the time, he did not specify what had happened, and the Edge referred to it merely as a "brush with mortality". Bono later revealed in his 2022 memoir Surrender: 40 Songs, One Story that he had undergone open-heart surgery due to a "blister" that formed over time in his aorta as a result of having a bicuspid aortic valve. The eight-hour operation was performed by David H. Adams at Mount Sinai Hospital, and Bono made a full recovery. As a result of the health scare, he decided to rework the album's lyrics. He admitted later that mortality was already going to be a theme on the album, as he thought the subject had been infrequently addressed and felt it was naturally suited for an album called Songs of Experience. However, he said the incident affected the overall mood of the album and made him realize "Not surrendering to melancholy is the most important thing if you are going to fight your way out of whatever corner you are in." As a result, he prioritised finding the right tempo for certain songs to ensure they were upbeat.

U2 felt that their chemistry was not adequately represented on the album's recordings to that point. Many of the individual parts, particularly Mullen's drums and Clayton's bass parts, had been recorded separately, and in the band's opinion, they lacked the energy that could be captured from a single band take. Having re-rehearsed the songs, in March 2017, U2 entered Electric Lady Studios in New York with their long-time producer Steve Lillywhite to re-record them as a group. Bono called Lillywhite the "best guy for recording us in the studio with the band playing live". The group were satisfied with the results, as they found a synthesis of their "raw band performances" with overdubs from previous recorded versions. The Edge called it "the best of the band chemistry mixed in with the best of the 21st-century production technology."

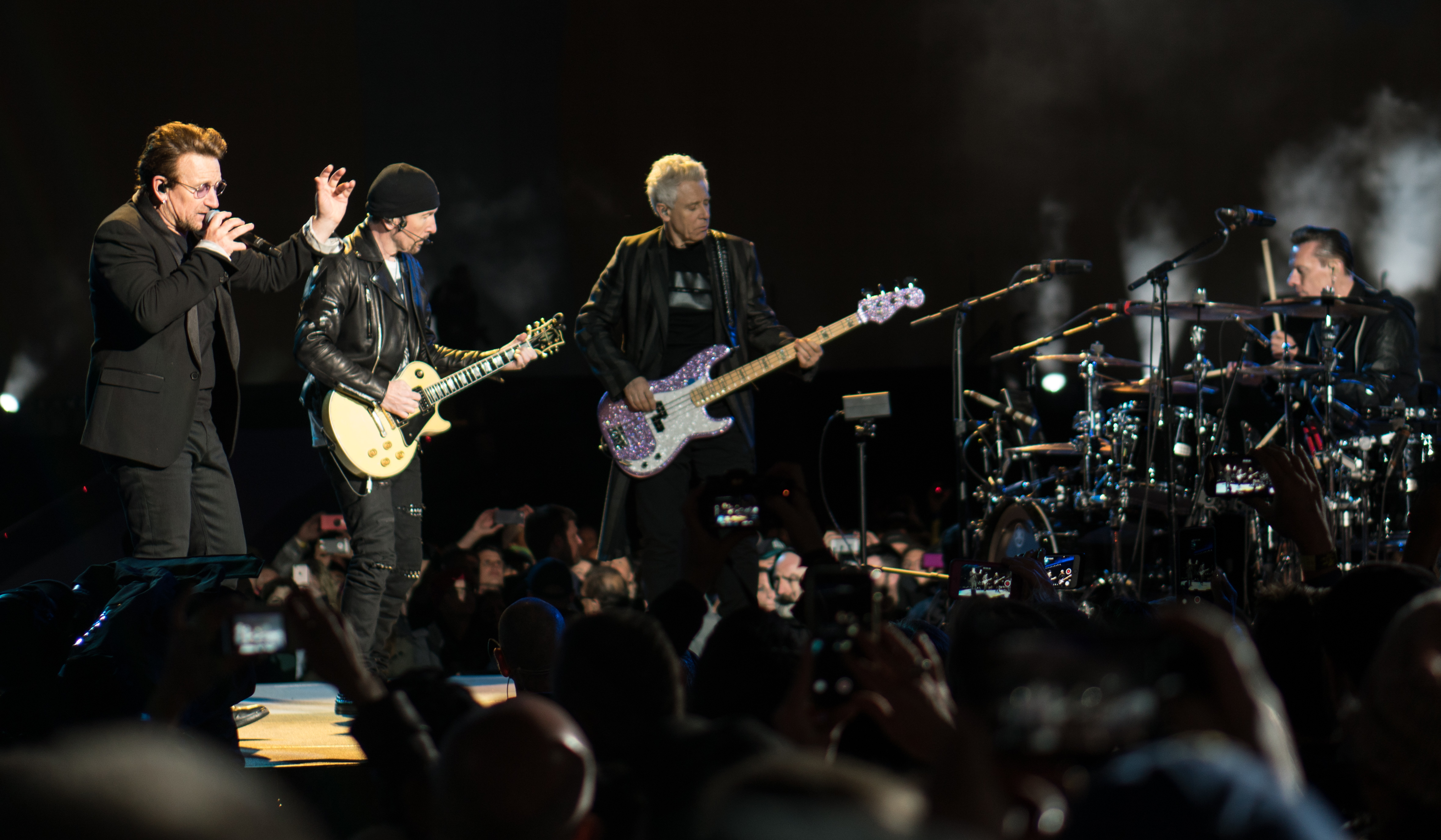
In May 2017, U2 began performing "The Little Things That Give You Away" during the Joshua Tree Tour 2017, making it the first new song from the album that they debuted.

In an April 2017 cover story for Mojo, Clayton said there were 15 or 16 songs that were contenders for the album, which they still hoped to whittle down to 12. The story mentioned new songs titled "The Showman", "Summer of Love", and "The Best Thing About You Is Me" [sic]. After embarking on the Joshua Tree Tour 2017 in May 2017, U2 debuted "The Little Things That Give You Away" live. During an interview with Hot Press on the second date of the tour, Bono mentioned a new song entitled "American Soul". Later that month, when asked about Songs of Experience, Bono remained non-committal on a release date, saying, "I thought it was done last year." He admitted that spending additional time working on the album had improved it, but said that "if you left it to Edge he'd still be remixing it next year." He later said that by putting the finishing touches on the album while touring, the music was imbued with a directness that would have been missing if they had been working in the studio non-stop for three years.

In September 2017, the Edge said the band had agreed upon the album's track listing, running order, and mixes, indicating that it was "absolutely ready to go beside the last polish", such as small mixing tweaks or lyrical changes. Barlow said that Bono was making lyric changes up to the last second before mastering.

== Composition ==
The lyrics of Songs of Experience reflect the "political and personal apocalypse" that Bono felt had occurred in his life in 2016, referring to his "brush with mortality" and the global events that occurred around the rise of conservatism. After his near-death experience, he followed the advice of Irish poet Brendan Kennelly to write as if he were dead, which the Edge said "frees you of having to... be delicate or be anything other than a pure expression of your essence". As a result, Bono wrote the lyrics as a series of letters to people and places closest to his heart. He said, "I know U2 go into every album like it's their last one but even more this time I wanted the people around me that I loved to know exactly how I felt." He also borrowed an idea from poet William Blake to compare oneself as an innocent person to who they become through experience. Accordingly, many of the lyrics contain a dialogue between innocence and experience. Musically, the band sought to use "joy as an act of defiance".

The opening song, "Love Is All We Have Left", was described by Bono as "Sinatra singing on the moon, a sci-fi torch song". Singing over a "sparse" arrangement of "trembling strings and synths" with his voice Auto-Tuned, he speaks from the perspective of his innocent self admonishing his experienced self. The guitar riff from "Lights of Home" is based on the bass breakdown from the Haim track "My Song 5"; the Haim sisters provide backing vocals in the chanting coda. Bono's lyrics in the song directly address his near-death experience, opening with "I shouldn't be here 'cause I should be dead / I can see lights in front of me". "You're the Best Thing About Me" originated from the band's attempt to write a song in the spirit of Motown, combining rhythmic music with a joyful mood. The lyrics were written by Bono as a love song for his wife, Ali, after he had a nightmare that he had destroyed their relationship. "Get Out of Your Own Way" is lyrically addressed to Bono's daughters, with words of encouragement to not be one's own worst enemy. The lyrics also reference the US political crisis, mentioning Liberty receiving a "smack in the mouth". Musically, the song was compared to the band's 2000 single "Beautiful Day". Segueing between the end of "Get Out of Your Own Way" and the beginning of "American Soul" is a spoken word segment by rapper Kendrick Lamar; playing what Bono called a "cracked preacher", Lamar gives an ironic take on the Beatitudes. Lamar previously sampled "American Soul" for his song "XXX". "American Soul" is Bono's letter to America; over "fuzzed-out guitar riffs", he takes a supportive stance on immigration and refugees while "calling the US... to account for its lapses in idealism". "Summer of Love", featuring Lady Gaga on backing vocals, was described as a "slinky Zombies pastiche" by The Boston Globe. The lyrics were inspired by the story of a gardener in Aleppo who grew flowers during the Syrian Civil War as an "act of defiance" before being killed by an air raid. A line in the chorus, "I've been thinking 'bout the west coast / Not the one that everyone knows", references the west coast of Syria. "Red Flag Day" was musically compared to songs from the band's 1983 album War as well as the Police. The lyrics contrast a romantic encounter on the beach with Syrian refugees attempting to escape via the Mediterranean Sea.

"The Showman (Little More Better)" features a "jaunty" acoustic arrangement that Bono described as "Beatles-in-Hamburg". Written as a letter to the group's audience, the lyrics are self-deprecating and warn of the ridiculousness and untrustworthiness of performers. "The Little Things That Give You Away" was described by Slant Magazine as a "sprawling slow burn that builds to a cascading eruption of guitar". The song's lyrics are framed as a conversation between an innocent self and their experienced self, with the latter having a breakdown towards the end of the song and admitting their deepest fears. "Landlady" is a tribute to Ali from Bono for supporting him during the group's early days and for being his motivation to return home. On "The Blackout", the band combine distorted guitars with a bassy, danceable groove, a result that The Telegraph said recalled the "audacious cyberpunk energy of Achtung Baby". Ruminating on the state of democracy as well as Bono's mortality, the lyrics mention natural disasters and extinction events in lines such as "Dinosaur wonders why it still walks the earth / A meteor promises it's not gonna hurt". "Love Is Bigger Than Anything in Its Way", described as "grandiose" by USA Today and as an "anthem" by Mojo, features Andrew Taggart of the Chainsmokers on keyboards. Bono wrote the lyrics as reassurance to his sons as if they were his last words to them. His message was that love has the power to overcome any obstacles and can help them reach their full potential. The closing song, "13 (There is a Light)", is a piano-based "lullaby" addressed to all of Bono's children, "urging them to summon the strength to face uncertain times".

Songs of Experience, as a companion piece to Songs of Innocence, contains a number of callbacks to its predecessor:

- The "free yourself to be yourself" chant-along outro from Innocence's "Iris (Hold Me Close)" reappears in "Lights of Home".
- The "you are rock and roll" middle eight from Innocence's "Volcano" is reused as the chorus for "American Soul".
- The chorus from Innocence's "Song for Someone" is reprised in "13 (There Is a Light)". "13" had originally been in consideration to close Songs of Innocence, but was ultimately dropped.

== Packaging and title ==
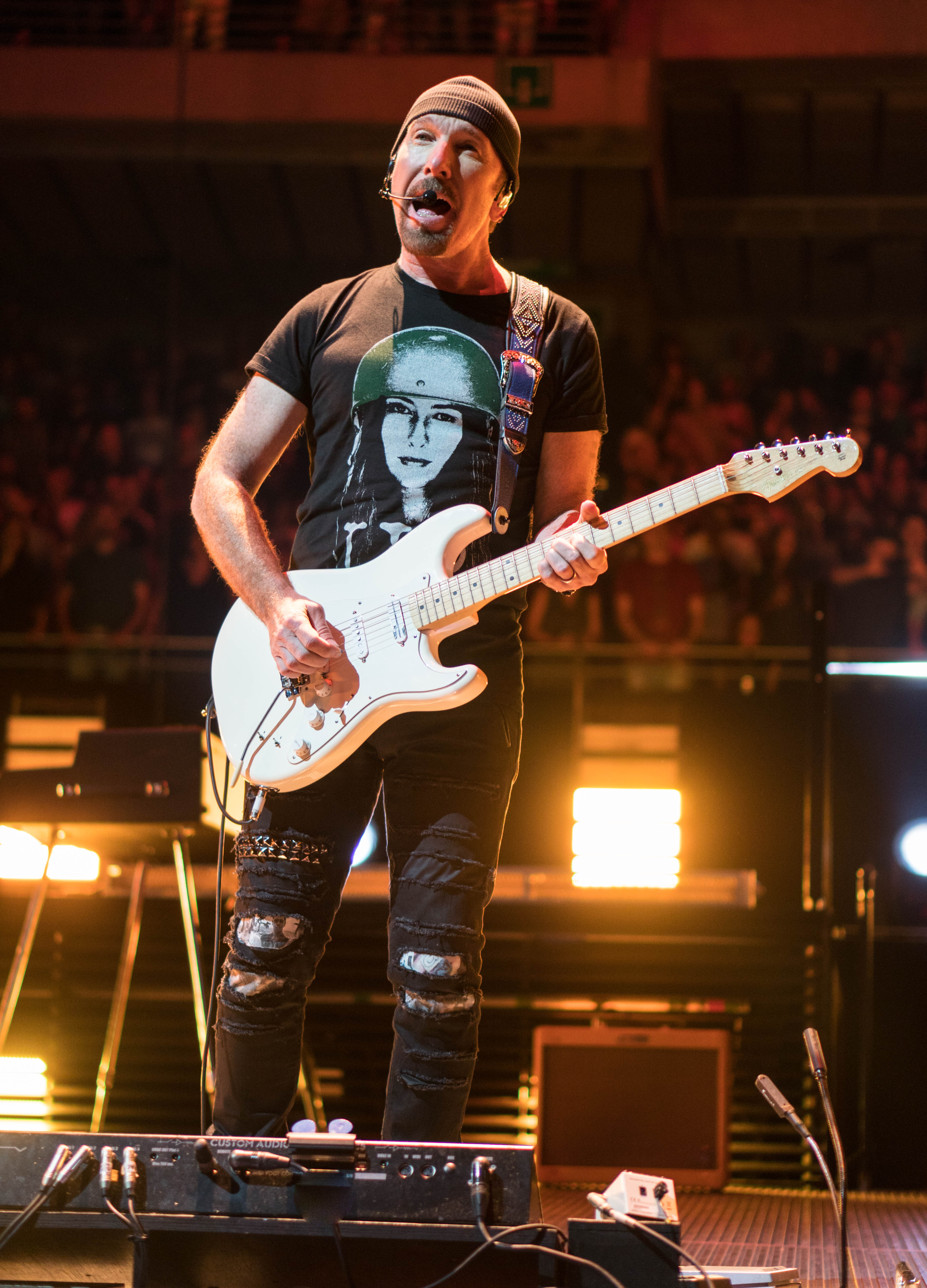
The Edge wearing a T-shirt bearing the likeness of his daughter Sian, who appears on the album cover

The album's packaging was designed by Shaughn McGrath, with the firm AMP Visual handling the album's design, art direction, and marketing. The photo on the album cover, taken by the band's long-time photographer Anton Corbijn, depicts Bono's son Eli and the Edge's daughter Sian holding hands. The Edge said that it was difficult to find a cover idea that could represent an album they consider to be both very personal and very universal. They ultimately decided to focus it on something other than the band members and to continue the family theme from the cover of Songs of Innocence, which depicted Mullen with his son, Elvis. Eli and Sian are barefoot in the photo, which was meant to signify "youthful innocence". Contrasting with this, Sian is wearing a US M1 military helmet, which was meant to symbolise the harsh realities of the world they must face. The album art was first shown in May 2017 during the opening concert of the Joshua Tree Tour 2017, when it was displayed on the stage's video screen after a performance of "The Little Things That Give You Away". The silhouette of Eli and Sian was subsequently used as a logo in promotional materials and on the band's merchandising.

The album's title, along with that of Songs of Innocence, are taken from William Blake's collection of poems Songs of Innocence and of Experience. In lieu of using a graphic framework or printing the album title on the cover, the designers represented the album's themes through the typography, Corbijn's photography, and the use of cyan in the packaging.

== Release and promotion ==
U2 collaborated with their label Island Records for the release of Songs of Experience, marking the first time since How to Dismantle an Atomic Bomb in 2004 that the label contributed to one of the band's albums. Island managing director Jon Turner said the label worked towards the album release for an estimated 18 months. After the no-cost iTunes release of Songs of Innocence that generated negative press, promotion of Songs of Experience was more traditional, with an emphasis on "embracing all digital platforms".

On 23 May 2017, U2 appeared on Jimmy Kimmel Live! and performed "The Little Things That Give You Away". At stops across the Joshua Tree Tour 2017, the band previewed the album for music and radio industry journalists and insiders with backstage listening sessions.

On 21 August 2017, several U2 fans in the United States received cryptic letters via postal mail teasing a new release from the band. The letters contained text mentioning Blake's Songs of Innocence and of Experience, with a silhouette of Bono's son and the Edge's daughter from the album cover blocking out most of the text except for a few words, revealing the message, "Blackout ... It's ... clear ... who ... you are ... will ... appear ... U2.com". The bottom of the letters said "U2 will announce" but blacked out the release title and date. Many of the recipients of the letter were in the path of that day's solar eclipse. On 30 August, after posting a teaser online the day prior, the band unveiled a video on Facebook Live showing a live performance of the new song "The Blackout". The video was part of a strategy to energise U2's core fans on social media by reaching them with new music first. "The Blackout" video was viewed more than 2 million times in 24 hours and 11 million in over a week.

The following week, on 6 September, "You're the Best Thing About Me" was released as the album's lead single, and The New York Times published an article on the album, stating it would be released on 1 December. On 7 September, the band performed "You're the Best Thing About Me" on The Tonight Show Starring Jimmy Fallon before debuting it live at a concert in Indianapolis three days later on the Joshua Tree Tour 2017. Island said that performances of the new single during the tour generated excitement for the album among commercial and media partners in attendance.

In late October, fans once again received mysterious postal mail letters, this time containing the Songs of Experience track listing blacked out except for one song. On 1 November, the band officially announced details of the album's release: a 1 December release date was confirmed, the album artwork was unveiled, and the release formats were announced; additionally, the tracks "Get Out of Your Own Way" and "The Blackout" were released on streaming services, and 2018 North American tour dates for the Experience + Innocence Tour were announced. The tour used Ticketmaster's Verified Fan platform for combating ticket reselling, making U2 the first group to do so for an entire tour. Every ticket purchased for the tour included a copy of Songs of Experience. Those who pre-ordered the album received "instant grat downloads" of "You're the Best Thing About Me", "Get Out of Your Own Way", and "The Blackout". The group performed at Trafalgar Square in London on 11 November prior to them receiving the Global Icon Award for the MTV Europe Music Awards. On 17 November, the song "American Soul" was released.

Songs of Experience was released on 1 December on several formats: compact disc, vinyl record, digital download, and streaming. Deluxe editions include up to four bonus tracks. The Extra Deluxe edition contains the album pressed on two 180-gram translucent cyan-coloured vinyl LPs along with a CD copy of the album with four bonus tracks. Also included are a digital download card, a fold-out poster, and a 16-page newspaper-style lyric sheet. The album was promoted in several ways upon release. Amazon Music produced online radio programming about the band called The U2 Experience. The content, which was available for the two days prior to the album's release date, included songs from across the band's career, interviews, and live recordings from the Joshua Tree Tour 2017. Spotify produced a mini-documentary about the group called U2 in America that was made available as part of a playlist of their songs, while the band also recorded a "Spotify Singles" session. Apple Music subscribers were given access to an eight-minute video of Bono narrating the album's liner notes. On the day of release, Bono made an appearance on the American football television program Good Morning Football, and the band briefly performed on a sidewalk underneath the High Line in New York City. U2 was the musical guest on the 2 December episode of American comedy television series Saturday Night Live; fellow countryperson Saoirse Ronan hosted the episode. Five days after the album's release, Bono and the Edge rode the Berlin subway line sharing the band's namesake and gave a short performance on a station platform. On 19 December, BBC One aired U2 at the BBC, an hour-long television special that featured performances by the band and interview segments with Cat Deeley.

"Get Out of Your Own Way" was released as the album's second single on 16 January 2018, with the song's music video following two days later. Members of U2 appeared in two performances at the 60th Annual Grammy Awards: Bono and the Edge participated in Kendrick Lamar's performance of "XXX", while the band pre-recorded a performance of "Get Out of Your Own Way" on a barge in front of the Statue of Liberty. A performance of "American Soul" was also filmed at the location and used as part of the song's promotional tie-in with the 2018 NCAA Division I men's basketball tournament; the song was used as "secondary theme" music accompanying television coverage by CBS Sports and Turner Sports, playing at the beginning of broadcasts of the games, before and after commercial breaks, and in television advertisements. ESPN also used the song in television coverage of Opening Day of the 2018 Major League Baseball season. "Love Is Bigger Than Anything in Its Way" was released to Triple A radio as the album's third single on 23 April.

=== Promotional releases and remixes ===
Several promotional singles and remixes of the album's songs were released. Kygo's dance remix of "You're the Best Thing About Me" was released on 15 September 2017. On 24 November, U2 issued a 12-inch vinyl single of "The Blackout" for Record Store Day Black Friday. Released in partnership with Third Man Records, the single includes the album version of the song and a remix by Jacknife Lee. The band released a second Record Store Day single on 21 April 2018, comprising a limited-edition 12-inch vinyl single of "Lights of Home" on picture disc that contains Beck's "Free Yourself" remix of the song. After the single release of "Get Out of Your Own Way", several remixes of the song were issued by Afrojack and Switch. Similarly, the single "Love Is Bigger Than Anything in Its Way" was remixed by many artists, including Beck, Cheat Codes, Will Clarke, the Funk Hunters, and Daybreakers. On 20 July 2018, an EP containing three remixes of the song by HP Hoeger and Rusty Egan was released by the band. The remixes of "Love Is Bigger Than Anything in Its Way" helped the song reach number one on the Billboard Dance Club Songs chart. On 10 August, the band released a four-song EP containing remixes of "Summer of Love" by Robin Schulz, TILT, Howie B, and HP Hoeger and Rusty Egan. "Landlady" was released as a promotional single in Italy on 19 October.

== Critical reception ==
Professional ratings
Aggregate scores
Source	Rating
AnyDecentMusic?	5.8/10
Metacritic	63/100
Review scores
Source	Rating
AllMusic	2.5/5 stars
Consequence of Sound	C−
The Daily Telegraph	4/5 stars
The Guardian	4/5 stars
The Independent	2/5 stars
Mojo	4/5 stars
NME	2/5 stars
Pitchfork	5.3/10
Q	4/5 stars
Rolling Stone	4.5/5 stars

Songs of Experience received generally mixed reviews from critics. At Metacritic, which assigns a weighted mean rating out of 100 to reviews from mainstream critics, the album has an average score of 63 based on 28 reviews. Mark Beaumont of NME found that the band are "old masters at pomping up whatever the kids are buying", comparing portions of the album to songs by Bastille and Kanye West. The review concluded, "U2 have built a stadium rock cruise liner they've zero interest in rocking, and '...Experience' is 50 minutes of very plain sailing indeed." David Sackllah of Consequence of Sound said the album too often "finds the band retreading well-worn material". He said that the lyrical rewrites to reflect the political climate resulted in the album being "full of references that can feel shoehorned in". Calum Marsh of Pitchfork said that Songs of Experience is "the shameless effort of four men in their late 50s to muster a contemporary, youthful sound." The review criticized Bono's lyrics for their platitudes and attempts to tackle political subjects, saying, "Despite the blatant bid to sound modish and rejuvenated, U2 cannot help in certain respects but sound the same." Andy Gill of The Independent said, "Rarely has a band of such stature sounded quite so enervated and bereft of inspiration as U2 do here". The review said the band had been "reduced to hackneyed cheap tricks and tired old truisms barely worth the chords they're strung on – which are themselves the limpest melodies of their career." Terence Cawley of The Boston Globe said the album rarely deviates from the formula that U2 has followed since their 2000 album All That You Can't Leave Behind, in that it combines musical crescendos with uninsightful motivational lyrics. He assessed that "the band rarely builds up enough momentum to achieve lift-off, instead slowing to an adult contemporary-friendly gait for much of the album's second half."

James McNair of Mojo called Songs of Experience an "infinitely more satisfying beast than its patchy predecessor" and "U2's strongest album this century". He praised the record for its hooks and for its final songs, on which he felt Bono was at his most vulnerable. Andrew Perry of Q said the album "will likely go down as a late-career classic". The review lauded the group for their ability to evoke a range of moods and sounds: "U2 have dug deep, yet they remain both postmodern and unpredictable. Able to assume many sounds and voices; to invoke their early-'80s innocence, but also none-more-experienced, masters of every inch of their game". Neil McCormick of The Daily Telegraph said that the album is filled with "big meaty hooks matched by singalong aphorisms". He was complimentary of the group for melding their personal conflict with the positivity of their music, saying the album demonstrates them at "their most mature and assured, playing songs of passion and purpose, shot through and enlivened with a piercing bolt of desperation". David Fricke of Rolling Stone said the group's reflection on their mortality provides an "urgency [that] binds and propels the mosaic jump of Experience". Fricke praised the group for offering glimpses of their past work, saying, "The mounting effect is a charge of dynamic moods and a still-certain mission". Alexis Petridis of The Guardian said that despite some awkward attempts to sound contemporaneous, the album was better than either of its predecessors and was "frequently fantastic". He singled out the moments dealing with Bono's "brush with mortality" as highlights, calling them the "most natural and enjoyable, as if concerns about their frontman's potential demise caused everyone to stop worrying about U2's place within the contemporary scheme of things and focus on the music".

In their end-of-year rankings, Rolling Stone named Songs of Experience the third-best album and "Lights of Home" the fifth-best song of 2017. "The Blackout" appeared on The New York Times' list of the 54 best songs of the year. For the 2017 Pazz & Jop end-of-year critics poll compiled by The Village Voice, Songs of Experience tied for 98th place on the list of best albums. For the 2018 Billboard Music Awards, it was nominated for Top Rock Album.

== Commercial performance ==
Songs of Experience debuted at number one on the US Billboard 200 with 186,000 album-equivalent units earned in its first week, 180,000 of which were sales. The record's debut benefited from the bundling promotion that included copies with tickets purchased for the Experience + Innocence Tour. Songs of Experience was the band's eighth number-one album in the US, the third-most of any group, and made them the first group to attain number-one albums in the US in the 1980s, 1990s, 2000s, and 2010s. It was the largest sales week of any rock album in the US in 2017. The album charted for nine weeks on the Billboard 200.

The record entered the Canadian Albums Chart at number one with 24,000 copies sold among 25,000 album-equivalent units, making it U2's sixth album to top the country's chart during the Nielsen SoundScan era. On the UK Albums Chart, the record opened at number five with 40,669 copies sold in its first week, before falling to number 20 the following week. It remained on the chart for 10 weeks. In the group's native Ireland, the record debuted at number one, making them the first band to have 12 number-one albums in the country. It also reached number one in the Netherlands, their 12th album to do so. Songs of Experience was the sixth-best-selling album globally in 2017, selling 1.3 million copies.

== Track listing ==
All lyrics are written by Bono; all music is composed by U2, except where noted.

Standard edition
No.	Title	Music	Producer	Length
1.	"Love Is All We Have Left"		Andy Barlow	2:41
2.	"Lights of Home"	U2; Alana Haim; Danielle Haim; Este Haim; Ariel Rechtshaid	Jacknife Lee; Ryan Tedder; Brent Kutzle; Jolyon Thomas^{[a]}	4:16
3.	"You're the Best Thing About Me"		Lee; Tedder; Steve Lillywhite; Kutzle	3:45
4.	"Get Out of Your Own Way"		Tedder; Lillywhite; Kutzle; Thomas; Lee^{[a]}	3:58
5.	"American Soul"		Lee; Thomas^{[a]}; Declan Gaffney^{[a]}	4:21
6.	"Summer of Love"		Tedder; Kutzle; Lee^{[a]}	3:24
7.	"Red Flag Day"		Tedder; Lillywhite; Kutzle; Barlow	3:19
8.	"The Showman (Little More Better)"		Tedder; Lillywhite; Lee^{[a]}	3:23
9.	"The Little Things That Give You Away"		Thomas; Barlow^{[a]}	4:55
10.	"Landlady"		Lee; Tedder^{[b]}; Barlow^{[a]}	4:01
11.	"The Blackout"		Lee; Tedder^{[b]}; Kutzle^{[a]}	4:45
12.	"Love Is Bigger Than Anything in Its Way"		Lee	4:00
13.	"13 (There Is a Light)"		Tedder; Paul Epworth	4:19
Total length:				51:07

Deluxe edition bonus tracks
No.	Title	Music	Producer	Length
14.	"Ordinary Love" (Extraordinary Mix)	U2; Brian Burton	Danger Mouse; Epworth; Gaffney^{[a]}	3:47
15.	"Book of Your Heart"		Barlow	3:55
16.	"Lights of Home" (St Peter's String Version)	U2; A. Haim; D. Haim; E. Haim; Rechtshaid	Tedder; Lee; Kutzle; Thomas^{[a]}	4:33
Total length:				63:22

Deluxe edition (CD) additional bonus track
No.	Title	Producer	Length
17.	"You're the Best Thing About Me" (U2 vs. Kygo)	Lee; Kygo^{[a]}^{[c]}	4:16
Total length:			67:38

Japanese deluxe edition (CD) additional bonus track
No.	Title	Producer	Length
18.	"The Blackout" (Jacknife Lee Remix)	Lee^{[c]}	7:18
Total length:			74:57

Notes

- ^{^[a]} – additional production
- ^{^[b]} – original production
- ^{^[c]} – remix

== Personnel ==
Adapted from the liner notes.

U2

- Bono – vocals
- The Edge – guitars, vocals, keyboards
- Adam Clayton – bass guitar
- Larry Mullen Jr. – drums, percussion

Additional performers

- Andy Barlow – additional keyboards (tracks 1, 9), programming (1), sound design (1)
- Jacknife Lee – additional keyboards (2–3, 5, 11–12), additional guitar (2, 5, 10–12), programming (2–3, 5, 11–12), keyboards (6), additional backing vocals (12)
- Haim – additional backing vocals (2)
- Ryan Tedder – programming/additional programming (3, 6–7), additional backing/background vocals (4, 6–8), keyboards (6), additional guitar (8)
- Brent Kutzle – programming/additional programming (3, 6–7), keyboards/additional keyboards (4, 6), additional guitar/acoustic guitar (6–7)
- Davide Rossi – strings (3, 10)
- Kendrick Lamar – outro (4), intro (5)
- Goshua Usov – additional keyboards (4)
- Jolyon Thomas – additional guitar (4, 9), additional keyboards (4, 9)
- Brandon Collins – string arrangement (6)
- Amy Helman – violins (6)
- Avery Bright – violins (6)
- Betsy Lamb – viola (6)
- Paul Nelson – cello (6)
- Noel Zancanella – additional programming (6)
- Nate Lotz – additional percussion (6)
- Lady Gaga – background vocals (6)
- Steve Wilmot – additional percussion (7)
- Declan Gaffney – additional keyboards (7)
- Julian Lennon – additional background vocals (7)
- Andrew Taggart – additional keyboards (12)
- Paul Epworth – programming (13), additional keyboards (13)
- Dawn Kenny – additional credit (1)

Technical

- Andy Barlow – production (tracks 1, 7), engineering (1), mixing (1), additional production (9–10)
- Jacknife Lee – production (2–3, 5, 10–12), additional production (4, 6, 8), mixing (2, 5, 11–12), engineering (3)
- Ryan Tedder – production (2–4, 6–8, 13), original production (10–11)
- Brent Kutzle – production (2–4, 6–7), additional production (11)
- Steve Lillywhite – production (3–4, 7–8), mixing (3, 8)
- Jolyon Thomas – production (4, 9), additional production (2, 5)
- Alex Bailey – mixing assistance (1), engineering assistance (7, 9)
- Matt Bishop – engineering (2–3, 6, 12), additional engineering (4), mixing assistance (5, 11–12)
- Tyler Spry – engineering (2–4, 6–7, 11)
- Drew Bang – additional engineering (2, 4–5), engineering (9)
- Dave "Squirrel" Covell – engineering assistance/additional engineering assistance (2, 5, 9–12)
- Barry McCready – engineering assistance (2–3, 5, 10–12)
- Matt Bishop – mixing assistance (2), engineering (5, 8, 10–11)
- Rich Rich – engineering (3–4, 6–8, 11, 13)
- Matty Green – engineering (3–4, 7–8), mixing assistance (8)
- Christopher Henry – additional engineering (3, 6–7), engineering assistance (4, 8, 11)
- Richard Rainey – additional engineering (3)
- Greg Clooney – additional engineering (3)
- Gosha Usov – engineering assistance (3–4, 7–8)
- Alan Kelly – engineering assistance (3)
- Kelana – mixing (3)
- Tom Elmhirst – additional mixing (3), mixing (4, 6–7, 9–10, 13)
- Brandon Bost – mixing assistance (3–4, 6, 9–10, 13), engineering (6, 9, 13), additional mixing assistance (7)
- Declan Gaffney – additional engineering (4, 10, 13), additional production (5), engineering (7, 11), additional mixing (7)
- Doug Sarrett – additional engineering (6)
- Aleks Von Korff – engineering assistance (7–8, 10)
- Paul Epworth – production (13)
- Matt Wiggins – engineering (13)

== Charts ==
=== Weekly charts ===
Chart (2017)	Peak position
Australian Albums (ARIA)	5
Austrian Albums (Ö3 Austria)	2
Belgian Albums (Ultratop Flanders)	1
Belgian Albums (Ultratop Wallonia)	2
Canadian Albums (Billboard)	1
Czech Albums (ČNS IFPI)	2
Danish Albums (Hitlisten)	2
Dutch Albums (Album Top 100)	1
Finnish Albums (Suomen virallinen lista)	6
French Albums (SNEP)	2
German Albums (Offizielle Top 100)	2
Greek Albums (IFPI)	6
Hungarian Albums (MAHASZ)	7
Irish Albums (IRMA)	1
Italian Albums (FIMI)	2
Japanese Albums (Oricon)	9
Latvian Albums (LaIPA)	4
New Zealand Albums (RMNZ)	9
Norwegian Albums (VG-lista)	5
Polish Albums (ZPAV)	4
Portuguese Albums (AFP)	1
Scottish Albums (Official Charts)	3
Slovak Albums (ČNS IFPI)	2
Spanish Albums (Promusicae)	2
Swedish Albums (Sverigetopplistan)	2
Swiss Albums (Schweizer Hitparade)	2
UK Albums (Official Charts)	5
US Billboard 200	1
US Top Rock Albums (Billboard)	1
US Indie Store Album Sales (Billboard)	1

=== Year-end charts ===
Chart (2017)	Position
Australian Albums (ARIA)	74
Austrian Albums (Ö3 Austria)	34
Belgian Albums (Ultratop Flanders)	41
Belgian Albums (Ultratop Wallonia)	34
Czech Albums (ČNS IFPI)	8
Danish Albums (Hitlisten)	87
Dutch Albums (Album Top 100)	16
French Albums (SNEP)	31
German Albums (Offizielle Top 100)	42
Hungarian Albums (MAHASZ)	75
Italian Albums (FIMI)	15
Polish Albums (ZPAV)	57
Portuguese Albums (AFP)	9
Spanish Albums (PROMUSICAE)	22
Swiss Albums (Schweizer Hitparade)	84
UK Albums (OCC)	82
Worldwide Albums (IFPI)	7

Chart (2018)	Position
Belgian Albums (Ultratop Flanders)	101
Belgian Albums (Ultratop Wallonia)	81
French Albums (SNEP)	120
Italian Albums (FIMI)	57
Portuguese Albums (AFP)	16
Spanish Albums (PROMUSICAE)	37
Swiss Albums (Schweizer Hitparade)	24
US Billboard 200	131
US Top Rock Albums (Billboard)	19

== Certifications ==
Region	Certification	Certified units/sales
Austria (IFPI Austria)	Gold	7,500^{‡}
Belgium (BRMA)	Gold	10,000^{‡}
Canada (Music Canada)	Gold	40,000^{‡}
Denmark (IFPI Danmark)	Gold	10,000^{‡}
France (SNEP)	2× Platinum	200,000^{‡}
Germany (BVMI)	Gold	100,000^{‡}
Italy (FIMI)	2× Platinum	100,000^{*}
Poland (ZPAV)	Gold	10,000^{‡}
Portugal (AFP)	Gold	7,500^{^}
Spain (Promusicae)	Gold	20,000^{‡}
United Kingdom (BPI)	Gold	100,000^{‡}
^{*} Sales figures based on certification alone.^{^} Shipments figures based on certification alone.^{‡} Sales+streaming figures based on certification alone.
