= You're the Best Thing About Me =

2017 single by U2

Single by U2

from the album Songs of Experience
- Released: 6 September 2017
- Genre: Pop rock
- Length: 3:45 (album version); 3:59 (Sci-Fi Soul mix); 3:47 (acoustic version)
- Label: Island
- Composer: U2
- Lyricist: Bono
- Producers: Jacknife Lee with Ryan Tedder, Steve Lillywhite, and Brent Kutzle

U2 singles chronology
"Song for Someone" (2015)	"You're the Best Thing About Me" (2017)	"The Blackout" (2017)

"You're the Best Thing About Me" is a song by Irish rock band U2. It is the third track on their fourteenth studio album, Songs of Experience, and was released as its lead single on 6 September 2017. Musically, "You're the Best Thing About Me" originated from the band's attempt to write a song in the spirit of Motown, combining rhythmic music with a joyful mood. The lyrics were written by lead vocalist Bono as a love song for his wife, Ali, after he had a nightmare that he had destroyed their relationship. A week prior to the song's single release, U2 re-recorded it while trying to find an arrangement they could perform live, returning the song to the more guitar-oriented style of its original demo. "You're the Best Thing About Me" reached number one on the US Adult Alternative Songs chart. Its release was followed by an electronic dance remix by Norwegian DJ Kygo.

== Writing and recording ==
Guitarist the Edge said that "You're the Best Thing About Me" originated from an attempt to write a song in the spirit of Motown, combining rhythmic music with a joyful mood, although he said there was nothing "obviously Motown" about the result. Lead vocalist Bono referred to the song as "defiant joy", something that he and the Edge said was more important than ever in the "difficult times" in which they were living. The song first emerged in August 2016 as an electronic dance remix by Norwegian DJ Kygo, which he played during his performance at the Cloud 9 Festival. The song was mentioned in an April 2017 issue of Mojo as a potential contender for Songs of Experience, albeit with a slightly different title.

According to the Edge, the song was one of several from the album for which Bono wrote lyrics to his friends and family after having a "major scare where he really wasn't sure he would be around very much in the future". Bono composed the lyrics after having a dream that he "had destroyed something that's most important to [him] – [his] relationship" with his wife Ali. The Edge described "You're the Best Thing About Me" as a love song but with another layer, as it raises the "cosmic question... why when everything is perfect do we have a tendency to mess it up?" Anticipating a reaction to the song, Bono joked, "You're putting out a song about your girlfriend when the world is on fire?" The song title was inspired by a comment that Irish media personality Eamon Dunphy made to Bono in a Dublin bar, telling him the best thing about him was Ali.

"You're the Best Thing About Me" was completed one week prior to its release as a single. The Edge said the prior version of the song had a more elaborate, complicated arrangement with a "mellow", "low-key" beginning. When U2 began discussing how to arrange the song for live performances, the guitarist found an early demo of it when they were first testing out various arrangement ideas. After listening to it, the group decided to revert to the song's original, simpler guitar-driven arrangement, using what the Edge called "the primary colors of U2" of guitar, drums, and bass. He said that as a result of the musical change, the lyrics "came to life" and the song had a counterbalance, as he believed the prior version was lyrically too reflective when it was mellower. He said the band worked "furiously" on the new version of the song for two days to meet their deadline for submitting it.

== Release and promotion ==
In a 15 May 2017 article in The Irish Times, Bono first mentioned that the band's next single would be "You're the Best Thing About Me". On 29 August 2017, the song was confirmed to be the first single from Songs of Experience, and it was released on 6 September. The cover photograph, taken by the band's photographer Anton Corbijn, depicts the Edge's daughter, Sian, wearing a military helmet. The image evokes the cover art of the group's 1998 compilation album The Best of 1980–1990, which showed the younger brother of Guggi, a friend of Bono, wearing a similar helmet. On 7 September, the band performed the song on The Tonight Show Starring Jimmy Fallon before debuting it live three days later at a concert in Indianapolis on the Joshua Tree Tour 2017. The song was the band's 42nd track to enter the Alternative Songs chart in the US, further extending their record for the chart. It was also the group's 27th entry on the Adult Alternative Songs chart, the second-most all time; the track eventually reached number one on Adult Alternative Songs, making it U2's record-breaking 13th track to top the chart.

On 15 September, a remix of the song by Kygo was released. The remix was the same collaboration with U2 that he debuted the year prior at the Cloud 9 Festival.

On 29 September, an acoustic version of the song was released.

== Music video ==
The song's official music video was directed by Jonas Åkerlund and premiered on 27 September 2017. It was filmed earlier that month while U2 were in New York City. The footage depicts the band members sightseeing in the city, making a visit to Ray's Pizza and a bar, touring Times Square on a double-decker bus, taking photographs with fans, and performing in front of the city's skyline. The band said the video is "a visual tapestry of tribute to New York and a serenade to the city's iconic symbols of American compassion and liberty".

== Personnel ==
Adapted from the liner notes.

U2

- Bono – vocals
- The Edge – guitars, vocals, keyboards
- Adam Clayton – bass guitar
- Larry Mullen Jr. – drums, percussion

Additional performers

- Jacknife Lee – additional keyboards, programming
- Ryan Tedder – programming
- Brent Kutzle – additional programming
- Davide Rossi – strings

Technical

- Jacknife Lee – production, engineering
- Ryan Tedder – production
- Brent Kutzle – production
- Steve Lillywhite – production, mixing
- Matt Bishop – engineering
- Tyler Spry – engineering
- Barry McCready – engineering assistance
- Rich Rich – engineering
- Matty Green – engineering
- Christopher Henry – additional engineering
- Richard Rainey – additional engineering
- Greg Clooney – additional engineering
- Gosha Usov – engineering assistance
- Alan Kelly – engineering assistance
- Kelana – mixing
- Tom Elmhirst – additional mixing
- Brandon Bost – mixing assistance

== Charts ==
=== Weekly charts ===
Chart (2017–2018)	Peak position
Argentina Anglo (Monitor Latino)	4
Australia (ARIA)	83
Belgium (Ultratop 50 Flanders)	29
Belgium (Ultratop 50 Wallonia)	45
Czech Republic Airplay (ČNS IFPI)	80
El Salvador (Monitor Latino)	16
Finland Download (Latauslista)	25
France (SNEP)	24
Hungary (Rádiós Top 40)	30
Hungary (Single Top 40)	13
Ireland (IRMA)	66
Italy (FIMI)	78
Italy Airplay (EarOne)	1
Luxembourg Digital Songs (Billboard)	3
Mexico Airplay (Billboard)	10
New Zealand Heatseekers (RMNZ)	5
Poland Airplay (ZPAV)	27
Portugal (AFP)	63
San Marino (SMRRTV Top 50)	1
Scotland (Official Charts Company)	29
Slovakia Airplay (ČNS IFPI)	82
Slovenia (SloTop50)	40
Sweden (Sverigetopplistan)	94
Switzerland (Schweizer Hitparade)	48
UK Singles (Official Charts)	92
Uruguay (Monitor Latino)	9
US Adult Alternative Airplay (Billboard)	1
US Alternative Airplay (Billboard)	21
US Adult Pop Airplay (Billboard)	16
US Hot Rock & Alternative Songs (Billboard)	5
US Rock & Alternative Airplay (Billboard)	16

=== Year-end charts ===
Chart (2017)	Position
US Hot Rock Songs (Billboard)	63
Chart (2018)	Position
US Hot Rock Songs (Billboard)	82

== Certifications ==
Region	Certification	Certified units/sales
Italy (FIMI)	Gold	25,000^{‡}
^{‡} Sales+streaming figures based on certification alone.

== Release history ==
Region	Date	Format	Label	Ref.
Various	6 September 2017	Digital download	Island	
Italy	8 September 2017	Contemporary hit radio	Universal	
United States	11 September 2017	Adult album alternative radio	Interscope	
United States	12 September 2017	Alternative radio	Interscope	
United States	25 September 2017	Hot adult contemporary radio	Interscope	

== Kygo remix ==
"You're the Best Thing About Me (Kygo Remix)"

Remix by U2 vs. Kygo

from the EP Stargazing
- Released: 15 September 2017
- Genre: Dance-pop; tropical house
- Length: 4:18
- Label: Ultra; Sony
- Songwriters: U2 (music), Bono (lyrics)
- Producers: Jacknife Lee; remix and additional production by Kygo

Norwegian DJ and record producer Kygo released a remix of "You're the Best Thing About Me" on 15 September 2017 by Ultra Music.
