= Love Is Bigger Than Anything in Its Way =

- Beck remix cover art

Single by U2

from the album Songs of Experience
- Released: 23 April 2018
- Genre: Pop
- Length: 4:00
- Label: Interscope
- Composer(s): U2
- Lyricist(s): Bono
- Producer(s): Jacknife Lee

U2 singles chronology
"Get Out of Your Own Way" (2018)	"Love Is Bigger Than Anything in Its Way" (2018)	"Summer of Love" (2018)

Music video
- "Love Is Bigger Than Anything in Its Way" on YouTube

"Love Is Bigger Than Anything in Its Way" is a song by Irish rock band U2. It is the twelfth track on their fourteenth studio album, Songs of Experience, and was released as its third single on 23 April 2018. In July 2018, it became U2's fourth number-one song on the Billboard Dance Club Songs chart, and their first since their previous number one "Beautiful Day" peaked in 2001.

== Background ==
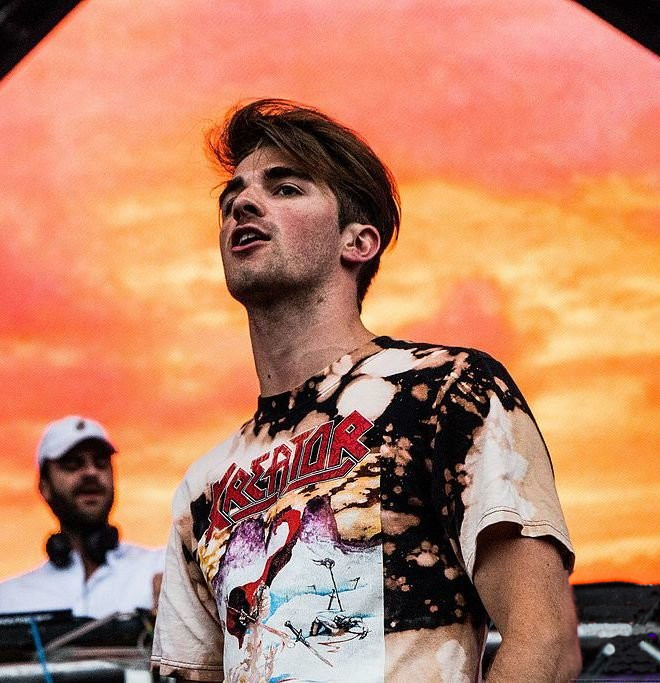
Andrew Taggart of The Chainsmokers contributed keyboards for "Love Is Bigger Than Anything in Its Way".

In an interview with iHeartRadio, lead singer Bono said "Love Is Bigger Than Anything in Its Way" was about using love to overcome personal difficulties. The song features Andrew Taggart of the Chainsmokers on keyboards.

== Release ==
"Love Is Bigger Than Anything in Its Way" was released on 23 April 2018. In May 2018, an acoustic rendition of "Love Is Bigger Than Anything in Its Way" was recorded by U2 at Third Man Records for vinyl. Throughout May 2018, multiple remixes were released including ones by The Funk Hunters and Cheat Codes. On 4 June 2018, American singer Beck also issued a remix version of the track.

== Music video ==
The first music video for "Love Is Bigger Than Anything in Its Way" was filmed in the fall of 2017. Photographer David Mushegain came up with the idea of incorporating his project on the Dublin youth lifestyle into a video after listening to U2's song. He solely filmed the video using a movie camera and included various youth from his prior Dublin lifestyle project. In the music video officially released on 27 April 2018, the video focuses on a group of Dublin teenagers dancing and posing while the song plays in the background. Mushegain initially planned on solely featuring teenagers who identify as LGBT+ but later decided to include Dubliners with various sexual orientations.

== Chart performance ==
On 24 July 2018, U2's rendition of "Love Is Bigger Than Anything in Its Way" peaked at number one on the Billboard Dance Club Songs chart. It became the band's fourth number one on the chart and their first since "Beautiful Day" in 2001.

=== Weekly charts ===
Chart (2018)	Peak position
Italy Airplay (EarOne)	23
US Adult Contemporary (Billboard)	13
US Adult Pop Airplay (Billboard)	18
US Dance Club Songs (Billboard)	1
US Hot Rock & Alternative Songs (Billboard)	25

=== Year-end charts ===
Chart (2018)	Position
US Adult Contemporary (Billboard)	42
US Dance Club Songs (Billboard)	24

== Beck remix ==
=== Music video ===
On 12 July 2018, a music video of Beck's remix was released. In the clay animation remix video, a man is preparing to embark on a journey while coping with the death of his wife.

=== Reception ===
Lake Schatz of Consequence of Sound said Beck's version was a more energetic rendition of U2's song. Alternatively, Joshua Copperman of Spin opined that the track sounded like a Jack Antonoff song but that Beck had created a modern-day version compared to the original.

== Release history ==
Country	Date	Format	Version	Label
United States	23 April 2018	AAA radio	Original	Interscope
Various	4 May 2018	Digital download; streaming	Remixes	Interscope
Various	11 May 2018	Digital download; streaming	Acoustic Version	Interscope
Various	25 May 2018	Digital download; streaming	U2 X Cheat Codes	Interscope
Italy	1 June 2018	Contemporary hit radio	Original	Universal
Various	1 June 2018	Digital download; streaming	Beck Remix	Interscope
Various	20 July 2018	Digital download; streaming	HP. Hoeger Rusty Egan Remixes	Interscope
