= Get Out of Your Own Way =

2017 single by U2

Single by U2

from the album Songs of Experience
- Released: 8 December 2017
- Genre: Pop rock
- Length: 3:58
- Label: Island, Universal
- Composer: U2
- Lyricist: Bono
- Producers: Ryan Tedder; Steve Lillywhite; Brent Kutzle; Jolyon Thomas; Jacknife Lee (add.)

U2 singles chronology
"The Blackout" (2017)	"Get Out of Your Own Way" (2017)	"Love Is Bigger Than Anything in Its Way" (2018)

"Get Out of Your Own Way" is a song by Irish rock band U2. It is the fourth track on their fourteenth studio album, Songs of Experience, and was released as the album's second single on 8 December 2017.

== Writing and recording ==
"Get Out of Your Own Way" is lyrically addressed to the daughters of lead vocalist Bono (actress Eve Hewson, and Jordan, both featured on the cover), with words of encouragement to not be one's own worst enemy. The lyrics also reference the US political crisis, mentioning Liberty receiving a "smack in the mouth". Musically, the song was compared to the band's 2000 single "Beautiful Day". Segueing between the end of "Get Out of Your Own Way" and the beginning of the album's next track, "American Soul", is a spoken word segment by rapper Kendrick Lamar; playing what Bono called a "cracked preacher", Lamar gives an ironic take on the Beatitudes.

== Release and promotion ==
On 1 November 2017, the band officially announced details of the album's release; as part of the announcement, "Get Out of Your Own Way" was one of two songs released on music streaming services. Those who pre-ordered the album received "instant grat downloads" of "Get Out of Your Own Way" and other songs. U2 performed "Get Out of Your Own Way" on the 2 December 2017 episode of American comedy television series Saturday Night Live.

"Get Out of Your Own Way" was released as the album's second single on 16 January 2018, with the song's music video following two days later. For the 60th Annual Grammy Awards, U2 pre-recorded the performance of "Get Out of Your Own Way" on a barge in front of the Statue of Liberty.

After the single release of "Get Out of Your Own Way", several remixes of the song were issued by Afrojack and Switch.

== Charts ==
=== Weekly charts ===
Chart (2017–18)	Peak position
Belgium (Ultratip Bubbling Under Flanders)	6
Belgium (Ultratop 50 Wallonia)	16
Hungary (Rádiós Top 40)	34
Italy Airplay (EarOne)	1
Japan Hot 100 (Billboard)	92
Switzerland (Schweizer Hitparade)	73
US Adult Alternative Airplay (Billboard)	3
US Adult Pop Airplay (Billboard)	31
US Hot Rock & Alternative Songs (Billboard)	29
US Rock & Alternative Airplay (Billboard)	39

=== Year-end charts ===
Chart (2018)	Position
Belgium (Ultratop Wallonia)	89
Hungary (Rádiós Top 40)	79

== Release history ==
Country	Date	Format	Version	Label
Italy	8 December 2017	Contemporary hit radio	Original	Universal
Various	29 December 2017	Digital download; streaming	Switch Remix	Interscope
United States	16 January 2018	Alternative radio	Original	Interscope
Various	26 January 2018	Digital download; streaming	Afrojack Remix	Interscope
Various	6 April 2018	Digital download; streaming	Acoustic Version	Interscope
