= Melon: Remixes for Propaganda =

Remix album by U2
- Released: February 1995
- Genres: Dance; electro-industrial
- Length: 63:42
- Label: Island
- Producer: Nick Angel

U2 chronology
Zoo TV: Live from Sydney (1994)	Melon: Remixes for Propaganda (1995)	Original Soundtracks 1 (1995)

Melon: Remixes for Propaganda is a compilation of remixes released by Irish rock band U2 exclusively to members of the band's magazine/fan club, Propaganda, in spring 1995. Some of the remixes were previously available on singles and some have been re-released on later singles and compilations, while some remain exclusive to this set. The title "Melon" is an anagram of "Lemon", which is a reference to U2's song of the same name that appears on two tracks of the album.

== Background ==
The idea behind the album began when U2 lead singer Bono complained how people do not dance to U2 music. The album was then created for the band to develop experimental music and "change people's perceptions of what to think of U2". Prior to its release, rumors about the album circulated for three years. Except for copies sent to radio stations, music press outlets, and friends of the band, Melon was only distributed to subscribers of U2's official magazine, Propaganda. At the time of release, Propaganda had around 35,000 subscribers, and fewer than 50,000 copies of Melon were pressed for release. For those who were not members of the magazine, the album was obtainable by signing up for a one-year subscription to Propaganda for US$18, until supplies were exhausted. The album's rarity made it a collector's item, with copies selling on eBay for £30 as late as 2010.

Melon spawned numerous bootleg imitations and was widely bootlegged itself. Various releases, known as "fruitlegs" or "fruitboots", have been released as compilations of official and unofficial remixes of various U2 songs. Although they claim to be official with the "Remixed for Propaganda" subtitle and a fake copyright, only Melon was approved by the band and released through the fan club.

== Reception ==
Professional ratings
Review scores
Source	Rating
AllMusic	3/5 stars

When promotional copies of Melon were distributed to the music press, Island Records requested they listen to the album, but not publish a review. However, several press outlets did provide some feedback about the release. The Austin American-Statesman mentioned how some songs only retained one feature of the original, such as the vocal track or guitar riff, and stated how the remixes were "so radically deconstructed that the original can be difficult to recognize". The Washington Post stated how bassist Adam Clayton and drummer Larry Mullen Jr. were "virtually wiped off the tracks" and replaced by drum machines, and how The Edge's guitar work and Bono's vocals were heavily modified. The Post also had a phone number in which readers could call to hear a sound bite of the album.

The Chicago Tribune writer Greg Kot compared the "perverse decision" to make Melon a fan magazine-only limited edition, with instructions for journalists not to review it, to the "anti-marketing approach" for Neil Young's Eldorado (1989), and believed it deserved a wider audience. "Although some U2 fans will no doubt find Melon the ultimate perversion", Kot noted, "it's a logical extension of the electro-industrial sound the band forged on its last two studio albums, and well worth seeking out."

In 2004, Mojo included Melon in their list of "The 67 Lost Albums You Must Own". In 2011, The Guardian the album in their list of "the 50 key events in the history of dance music". Richard Vine of the newspaper wrote that Primal Scream's Screamadelica (1991) "showed how far rock music could be stretched when a DJ was let loose in the studio to rip it up and start again. Soon, there wasn't a guitar band left without a 'dance element' in their music", adding that U2 "got in on the act" both with Melon and Paul Oakenfold's support DJ slots on the Zoo TV Tour.

== Track listing ==
All lyrics are written by Bono (except "Numb" by The Edge); all music is composed by U2.

Melon: Remixes for Propaganda track listing
No.	Title	Remixed by	Length
1.	"Lemon" (The Perfecto Mix)	Paul Oakenfold and Steve Osborne	8:57
2.	"Salomé" (Zooromancer Remix)	Pete Heller and Terry Farley	8:03
3.	"Numb" (Gimme Some More Dignity Mix)	Rollo & Rob D	8:47
4.	"Mysterious Ways" (The Perfecto Mix)	Paul Oakenfold and Steve Osborne	7:08
5.	"Stay" (Underdog Mix)	Underdog	6:45
6.	"Numb" (The Soul Assassins Mix)	Soul Assassins	3:57
7.	"Mysterious Ways" (Massive Attack Remix)	Massive Attack	4:51
8.	"Even Better Than the Real Thing" (The Perfecto Mix)	Paul Oakenfold and Steve Osborne	6:39
9.	"Lemon" (Bad Yard Club Mix)	David Morales	8:36
Total length:			63:42

"Lemon (The Perfecto Mix)" previously appeared on the singles for "Lemon" and "Stay (Faraway, So Close!)". "Lemon (Bad Yard Club Mix)" also appeared on the "Lemon" single. "Salomé (Zooromancer Remix)" first appeared on the "Who's Gonna Ride Your Wild Horses" single. "Mysterious Ways (The Perfecto Mix)" was a B-side for the "Mysterious Ways" single, while "Even Better Than the Real Thing (The Perfecto Mix)" was released on the single for "Even Better Than the Real Thing".

"Numb (Gimme Some More Dignity Mix)", "Stay (Underdog Mix)", "Numb (The Soul Assassins Mix)", and "Mysterious Ways (remixed by Massive Attack)" were all previously unreleased tracks, although "Numb (The Soul Assassins Mix)" was later included as a B-side on the single for "Last Night on Earth". "Salomé (Zooromancer Remix)", "Even Better Than the Real Thing (The Perfecto Mix)", and "Numb (Gimme Some More Dignity Mix)" were later included on the B-sides disc of the compilation album The Best of 1990-2000.

=== Promo release ===
In addition to the album on CD, Island Records also officially released a four-track 12" vinyl to disc jockeys.

Melon: Remixes for Propaganda promo track listing
No.	Title	Length
1.	"Salomé" (Zooromancer remix)	8:02
3.	"Numb" (the Soul Assassins mix)	3:58
4.	"Numb" (Gimme Some More Dignity mix)	8:47
9.	"Lemon" (Bad Yard Club mix)	8:36

== Personnel ==
U2

- Bono – lead vocals
- The Edge – guitar, keyboards, vocals
- Adam Clayton – bass guitar
- Larry Mullen Jr. – drums

Technical personnel

- Nick Angel – production

== See also ==
- U2 discography
