= The Best of 1990–2000 =

2002 greatest hits album by U2

Greatest hits album by U2
- Released: 5 November 2002
- Recorded: 1990–2002
- Genres: Rock, alternative rock
- Length: 71:53
- Label: Island/Interscope
- Producers: Steve Lillywhite; Brian Eno; Daniel Lanois; William Orbit; Bono; The Edge; Adam Clayton; Larry Mullen Jr.; Flood; Nellee Hooper; Paul Barrett; Howie B

U2 chronology
7 (2002)	The Best of 1990–2000 (2002)	U2 Go Home: Live from Slane Castle, Ireland (2003)

Singles from The Best of 1990–2000
- 1. "Electrical Storm" Released: 21 October 2002

Professional ratings
Review scores
Source	Rating
AllMusic	3/5 stars
Blender	4/5 stars
Entertainment Weekly	B−
Pitchfork	5.6/10
Rolling Stone	4/5 stars

The Best of 1990–2000 is the second greatest hits album by Irish rock band U2. It was released on 5 November 2002 through Island Records and Interscope Records. The follow-up to The Best of 1980–1990 (1998), it was issued as both a single-disc CD compilation and as a multi-disc compilation called The Best of 1990–2000 & B-Sides, which included a second disc of 14 B-sides released between 1990 and 2000 and a bonus DVD. A video album of the same name was later released in December 2002.

The Best of 1990–2000 contained two newly recorded tracks: "Electrical Storm" and "The Hands That Built America"; the former was released as a single, while the latter was released on the soundtrack to Gangs of New York. The compilation also includes "new mixes" of several songs, as well the tracks "Hold Me, Thrill Me, Kiss Me, Kill Me" (a non-album single from 1995) and "Miss Sarajevo" (which was originally credited to Passengers and also released as a single in 1995).

The album charted at number one in 13 countries and was the twelfth-best-selling album of 2002, according to the International Federation of the Phonographic Industry.

== Track listing ==
No.	Title	Album	Length
1.	"Even Better Than the Real Thing"	Achtung Baby (1991)	3:39
2.	"Mysterious Ways" (Best of version)	Achtung Baby	4:02
3.	"Beautiful Day"	All That You Can't Leave Behind (2000)	4:05
4.	"Electrical Storm" (William Orbit mix)	New song	4:37
5.	"One"	Achtung Baby	4:35
6.	"Miss Sarajevo" (Radio edit; originally credited to Passengers (U2 & Brian Eno))	Original Soundtracks 1 (1995)	4:30
7.	"Stay (Faraway, So Close!)"	Zooropa (1993)	4:58
8.	"Stuck in a Moment You Can't Get Out Of"	All That You Can't Leave Behind	4:31
9.	"Gone" (New mix)	Pop (1997)	4:32
10.	"Until the End of the World"	Achtung Baby	4:38
11.	"The Hands That Built America" (Theme from Gangs of New York)	New song	4:57
12.	"Discothèque" (New mix)	Pop	4:40
13.	"Hold Me, Thrill Me, Kiss Me, Kill Me"	Batman Forever Soundtrack (1995)	4:44
14.	"Staring at the Sun" (New mix)	Pop	4:48
15.	"Numb" (New mix)	Zooropa	4:21
16.	"The First Time"	Zooropa	3:44
Total length:			71:53

UK and Japan release
No.	Title	Album	Length
17.	"The Fly"	Achtung Baby	4:28

"Electrical Storm" was released as a single in promotion of the album. "Gone", "Discothèque", "Staring at the Sun", and "Numb" were remixed by Mike Hedges for the compilation. "Mysterious Ways" is identical to the album version with the exception of a single lyric. "Miss Sarajevo", co-written by Brian Eno, was originally included on the album Original Soundtracks 1, which was released by the band under the alias "Passengers".

== Limited Edition B-sides Disc ==
No.	Title	Originally released on	Length
1.	"Lady with the Spinning Head" (Extended dance mix)	"Even Better Than the Real Thing" single	6:06
2.	"Dirty Day" (Junk Day mix)	"Please" single	4:40
3.	"Summer Rain"	"Beautiful Day" single	4:07
4.	"Electrical Storm" (Band version)	New song	4:26
5.	"North and South of the River"	"Staring at the Sun" single	4:36
6.	"Your Blue Room"	Original Soundtracks 1	5:26
7.	"Happiness Is a Warm Gun" (Gun mix)	"Last Night on Earth" single	4:45
8.	"Salomé" (Zooromancer remix edit)	"Who's Gonna Ride Your Wild Horses" single	5:51
9.	"Even Better Than the Real Thing" (Perfecto mix)	"Even Better Than the Real Thing" single	6:38
10.	"Numb" (Gimme Some More Dignity Mix edit)	Melon: Remixes for Propaganda	5:50
11.	"Mysterious Ways" (Solar Plexus Club mix)	"Mysterious Ways" single	4:08
12.	"If God Will Send His Angels" (Big Yam mix)	"Mofo" single	5:42
13.	"Lemon" (Jeep mix)	"Lemon" single	5:29
14.	"Discothèque" (Hexidecimal mix edit)	"Discothèque" single	5:45
Total length:			73:52

"North and South of the River" was written with Christy Moore. "Happiness Is a Warm Gun" was written by Lennon–McCartney. "Your Blue Room" was written with Brian Eno.

Limited Edition Bonus DVD
No.	Title	Length
1.	"The History Mix"	7:40
2.	"U2: The Best of 1990–2000 DVD Trailer"	2:27
3.	"Please" (Live mural cut)	5:00
4.	"Beautiful Day" (Èze version)	4:04
Total length:		19:11

"The History Mix" is a video montage anthologizing the band's nineties albums and tours. It includes snippets of interviews, promotional videos, and so forth. The live version of "Please" is from the Helsinki Olympic Stadium in Helsinki, Finland, recorded on 9 August 1997 and directed by Maurice Linnane.

== Charts ==
=== Weekly charts ===
Weekly chart performance for The Best of 1990–2000
Chart (2002)	Peak position
Australian Albums (ARIA)	1
Austrian Albums (Ö3 Austria)	1
Belgian Albums (Ultratop Flanders)	1
Belgian Albums (Ultratop Wallonia)	3
Canadian Albums (Billboard)	1
Danish Albums (Hitlisten)	1
Dutch Albums (Album Top 100)	1
Finnish Albums (Suomen virallinen lista)	4
German Albums (Offizielle Top 100)	4
Greek Albums (IFPI)	1
Hungarian Albums (MAHASZ)	3
Irish Albums (IRMA)	1
Italian Albums (FIMI)	1
Japanese Albums (Oricon)	3
New Zealand Albums (RMNZ)	1
Norwegian Albums (VG-lista)	2
Portuguese Albums (AFP)	47
Scottish Albums (Official Charts)	30
Scottish Albums (Official Charts) & B-Sides	1
Spanish Albums (AFYVE)	1
Swedish Albums (Sverigetopplistan)	6
Swiss Albums (Schweizer Hitparade)	1
UK Albums (Official Charts)	37
UK Albums (Official Charts) & B-Sides	2
US Billboard 200	34
US Billboard 200 & B-Sides	3

=== Year-end charts ===
Year-end chart performance for The Best of 1990–2000
Chart (2002)	Position
Australian Albums (ARIA)	14
Austrian Albums (Ö3 Austria)	34
Belgian Albums (Ultratop Flanders)	12
Belgian Albums (Ultratop Wallonia)	25
Canadian Albums (Nielsen SoundScan)	95
Canadian Alternative Albums (Nielsen SoundScan)	28
Canadian Alternative Albums (Nielsen SoundScan) & B-Sides	7
Dutch Albums (Album Top 100)	24
German Albums (Offizielle Top 100)	81
Irish Albums (IRMA)	3
Italian Albums (FIMI)	6
Swiss Albums (Schweizer Hitparade)	19
UK Albums (OCC)	108
UK Albums (OCC) & B-Sides	45
Worldwide Albums (IFPI)	12

Chart (2003)	Position
Australian Albums (ARIA)	24
Austrian Albums (Ö3 Austria)	54
Belgian Albums (Ultratop Flanders)	34
Belgian Albums (Ultratop Wallonia)	73
Dutch Albums (Album Top 100)	36
German Albums (Offizielle Top 100)	93
Hungarian Albums (MAHASZ)	89
Irish Albums (IRMA)	18
Italian Albums (FIMI)	35
New Zealand Albums (RMNZ)	35
UK Albums (OCC) & B-Sides	160

=== Decade-end charts ===
Chart (2000–09)	Position
Australian Albums (ARIA)	74

== Certifications ==
Region	Certification	Certified units/sales
Argentina (CAPIF)	2× Platinum	80,000^{^}
Australia (ARIA)	2× Platinum	140,000^{^}
Austria (IFPI Austria)	Platinum	30,000^{*}
Belgium (BRMA)	2× Platinum	100,000^{*}
Brazil (Pro-Música Brasil)	Platinum	125,000^{*}
Canada (Music Canada)	3× Platinum	300,000^{^}
Denmark (IFPI Danmark)	4× Platinum	80,000^{‡}
Finland (Musiikkituottajat)	Gold	29,864
France (SNEP)	2× Gold	200,000^{*}
Germany (BVMI)	Gold	150,000^{^}
Greece (IFPI Greece)	Platinum	30,000^{^}
Hungary (MAHASZ)	Gold	10,000^{^}
Italy (FIMI) sales since 2009	Gold	25,000^{*}
Japan (RIAJ)	Gold	100,000^{^}
Mexico (AMPROFON)	Gold	75,000^{^}
Netherlands (NVPI)	Platinum	80,000^{^}
New Zealand (RMNZ)	4× Platinum	60,000^{^}
Poland (ZPAV)	Gold	35,000^{*}
Spain (Promusicae)	Platinum	100,000^{^}
Sweden (GLF)	Gold	30,000^{^}
Switzerland (IFPI Switzerland)	2× Platinum	80,000^{^}
United Kingdom (BPI)	2× Platinum	600,000^{^}
United States (RIAA)	Platinum	1,000,000^{^}
Summaries
Europe (IFPI)	3× Platinum	3,000,000^{*}
^{*} Sales figures based on certification alone.^{^} Shipments figures based on certification alone.^{‡} Sales+streaming figures based on certification alone.

== Video ==
The Best of 1990–2000

Video by U2
- Released: 2 December 2002
- Recorded: 1991–2002
- Genre: Rock
- Length: 176:00; 111:49 (main feature); 77:31 (tracks 1–16 only)
- Labels: Island, Interscope
- Directors: Kevin Godley, Stéphane Sednaoui, Jonas Åkerlund, Anton Corbijn, et al.
- Producer: Ned O'Hanlon

U2 chronology
Elevation 2001: Live from Boston (2002)	The Best of 1990–2000 (2002)	U2 Go Home: Live from Slane Castle, Ireland (2003)

The Best of 1990–2000 was also released as a video compilation, featuring music videos from the songs on the album. The DVD version of the video featured one to two videos for each song on the album, plus seven bonus videos (for songs not on the album), as well as directors' commentaries, and three mini-documentaries. The VHS version of the video featured simply one video for the 16 songs from the album.

On all versions however, there is no video for "The First Time", as one was never made or rather released. In its place was put the video of "The Fly", which itself was on certain versions of the album. The DVD case had two disc slots, one for the main videos, the other for the "History Mix" DVD from the "A and B sides" version of the album. In its absence, a CD/DVD-shaped paper disc is used as a placeholder.

=== Track listing ===
Music and words by U2, except where otherwise noted.

1. "Even Better Than the Real Thing"
  - Kevin Godley video with commentary
  - Ritchie Smyth remix video
2. "Mysterious Ways"
  - Stéphane Sednaoui video with commentary
3. "Beautiful Day"
  - Jonas Åkerlund video with commentary
4. "Electrical Storm"
  - Anton Corbijn video with commentary
  - U2 Sur Mer documentary
5. "One"
  - Anton Corbijn video with commentary
  - Phil Joanou video with commentary
  - A Story of One documentary
6. "Miss Sarajevo"
  - Maurice Linnane video and commentary
  - Missing Sarajevo documentary
7. "Stay (Faraway, So Close!)"
  - Wim Wenders video and commentary
8. "Stuck in a Moment You Can't Get Out Of"
  - Joseph Kahn video with commentary
  - Kevin Godley video with commentary
9. "Gone"
  - David Mallet video (excerpt from PopMart: Live from Mexico City)
10. "Until the End of the World"
  - Kevin Godley video (live from Zoo TV Tour)
11. "The Hands That Built America"
  - Maurice Linnane studio version video
12. "Discothèque"
  - Stéphane Sednaoui video with commentary
13. "Hold Me, Thrill Me, Kiss Me, Kill Me"
  - Godley/Linanne video with commentary
14. "Staring at the Sun"
  - Jake Scott video with commentary
  - Morleigh Steinberg video
15. "Numb"
  - Kevin Godley video with commentary
  - Emergency Broadcast Network remix video
16. "The Fly"
  - Smith/Klein remix video with commentary

=== Bonus videos ===
1. "Please"
  - Anton Corbijn video with commentary
2. "If God Will Send His Angels"
  - Phil Joanou video with commentary
3. "Who's Gonna Ride Your Wild Horses"
  - Phil Joanou video with commentary
4. "Lemon"
  - Mark Neale video with commentary
5. "Last Night on Earth"
  - Ritchie Smyth video with commentary
6. "Mofo"
  - Maurice Linnane remix video
7. "The Ground Beneath Her Feet"
  - Wim Wenders video with commentary
- An "easter egg" also features. From the main menu on the DVD, if "One" is clicked, the main screen for "One" will appear. Once on this screen, the digit '1' could be clicked on the remote control three times. If clicked three times, a three-minute video of a fish tank, with fish swimming in it, appears. After some time, some Trabants will appear in the video as fishes, which swim from one end of the screen to the other.

All tracks were remastered for these releases.

=== Certifications ===
Region	Certification	Certified units/sales
Argentina (CAPIF)	Platinum	8,000^{^}
Brazil (Pro-Música Brasil)	Platinum	50,000^{*}
France (SNEP)	Platinum	20,000^{*}
Mexico (AMPROFON)	Gold	10,000^{^}
^{*} Sales figures based on certification alone.^{^} Shipments figures based on certification alone.

== Personnel ==
Credits adapted from liner notes.

- Bono – vocals, guitar
- The Edge – guitar, keyboards, vocals
- Adam Clayton – bass guitar
- Larry Mullen Jr. – drums and percussion, backing vocals on "Numb"

== See also ==
- U2 discography
