= The Hands That Built America =

Song by U2

from the album The Best of 1990–2000 / Gangs of New York: Music from the Miramax Motion Picture
- Released: 5 November 2002
- Genre: Symphonic rock
- Length: 4:35 (Soundtrack Mix); 4:58 (The Best of 1990–2000 Version)
- Label: Interscope
- Songwriter: U2
- Producer: The Edge

"The Hands That Built America" is a song by Irish rock band U2. It was released on the soundtrack to the film Gangs of New York, and was one of two new songs on the group's The Best of 1990–2000 compilation (the other being "Electrical Storm"). It was nominated for Best Original Song at the 75th Academy Awards, but lost to Eminem's "Lose Yourself".

== Composition ==
"The Hands That Built America" is a song about the experience of nineteenth century Irish migrants to New York and their contribution to building America. The song was considered for single release and was announced as such for a 2003 release. The songs "The Playboy Mansion" (2003 Version - originally from Pop) and "That's Life" (a cover song by Bono and released on the soundtrack for The Good Thief) were announced as B-sides. However, the release was canceled.

== Soundtrack and inspiration ==
The soundtrack mix of the song features Andrea Corr, who played the tin whistle, and Sharon Corr who played the violin. The title of the song was inspired by Horslips title track to their album "The Man Who Built America" with the full blessing of Horslips singer and bass player Barry Devlin, who had also produced a number of U2 videos. In Gangs of New York the song is played with a long and grand intro and plays over the final sequence and the closing credits.

== Live performances ==
The music video features numerous transitions between band performance images and scenes from "Gangs of New York"

U2 have performed this song live in its entirety seven times, the first being at the premiere of Gangs of New York on 9 December 2002, and the last occurrence done solely by Bono and the Edge as an acoustic performance at the opening of the Clinton Presidential Library in Little Rock, Arkansas on 18 November 2004.

Although "The Hands That Built America" has not been played live since 2004, it was included at every concert on the Vertigo Tour (2005–2006) as a snippet during performances of "Bullet the Blue Sky". This took place in conjunction with snippets of "When Johnny Comes Marching Home" and sometimes "Please". It was later featured as a snippet again on the Innocence + Experience Tour before "Pride (In the Name of Love)". It was later replaced by "Zooropa" on the European leg of the tour.

== Music videos ==
The second version of the video shows black-and-white footage of the band playing an acoustic version of the song.

Two different music videos were created for "The Hands That Built America". The first uses a combination of black-and-white footage of the band playing the song, and scenes from Gangs of New York. This video uses the version of the song found on The Best of 1990–2000 CD. The second video is composed solely of black-and-white footage of U2 playing the song, and it was filmed on 9 May 2002. This video uses an acoustic version of the song, and is the version found on The Best of 1990–2000 DVD.

== Credits and personnel ==
U2

- Bono – vocals
- The Edge – guitar
- Adam Clayton – bass guitar
- Larry Mullen Jr. – drums, percussion

Technical

- Production – The Edge
- Engineering – Carl Glanville
- Mixing – William Orbit at The Leonard Hotel, London
- Additional keyboards – William Orbit
- Pro-Tools programming – Iain Roberton, Jake Davies and Rico Conning
- String arrangement – The Edge
- String conductor – Daragh O'Toole
- Strings – Katie O'Connor, Rosie Nic Athlaioch, Emer O'Grady, Una O'Kane
- Recording – HQ, Dublin and Nice, France

== See also ==
- U2 discography
