= List of number-one singles of 1991 (Ireland) =

The following is a list of the IRMA's number-one singles of 1991. In 1991, Bryan Adams's "(Everything I Do) I Do It For You" spent 11 weeks at No. 1, while The Simpsons' "Do the Bartman" spent 9 weeks at the top of the chart.

| Issue date | Song | Artist | Ref. |
|---|---|---|---|
| 3 January | "The Christmas No. 1" | Zig and Zag | |
| 10 January | "The Christmas No. 1" | Zig and Zag | |
| 17 January | "Sadeness (Part I)" | Enigma | |
| 24 January | "Do the Bartman" | The Simpsons | |
| 31 January | "Do the Bartman" | The Simpsons | |
| 7 February | "Do the Bartman" | The Simpsons | |
| 14 February | "Do the Bartman" | The Simpsons | |
| 21 February | "Do the Bartman" | The Simpsons | |
| 28 February | "Do the Bartman" | The Simpsons | |
| 7 March | "Do the Bartman" | The Simpsons | |
| 14 March | "Do the Bartman" | The Simpsons | |
| 21 March | "Do the Bartman" | The Simpsons | |
| 28 March | "Rhythm of My Heart" | Rod Stewart | |
| 4 April | "Deep, Deep Trouble" | The Simpsons | |
| 11 April | "Deep, Deep Trouble" | The Simpsons | |
| 18 April | "Deep, Deep Trouble" | The Simpsons | |
| 25 April | "Deep, Deep Trouble" | The Simpsons | |
| 2 May | "The Shoop Shoop Song (It's in His Kiss)" | Cher | |
| 9 May | "The Shoop Shoop Song (It's in His Kiss)" | Cher | |
| 16 May | "The Shoop Shoop Song (It's in His Kiss)" | Cher | |
| 23 May | "The Shoop Shoop Song (It's in His Kiss)" | Cher | |
| 30 May | "The Shoop Shoop Song (It's in His Kiss)" | Cher | |
| 6 June | "The Shoop Shoop Song (It's in His Kiss)" | Cher | |
| 13 June | "Light My Fire" | The Doors | |
| 20 June | "Light My Fire" | The Doors | |
| 27 June | "Any Dream Will Do" | Jason Donovan | |
| 4 July | "(Everything I Do) I Do It for You" | Bryan Adams | |
| 11 July | "(Everything I Do) I Do It for You" | Bryan Adams | |
| 18 July | "(Everything I Do) I Do It for You" | Bryan Adams | |
| 25 July | "(Everything I Do) I Do It for You" | Bryan Adams | |
| 1 August | "(Everything I Do) I Do It for You" | Bryan Adams | |
| 8 August | "(Everything I Do) I Do It for You" | Bryan Adams | |
| 15 August | "(Everything I Do) I Do It for You" | Bryan Adams | |
| 22 August | "(Everything I Do) I Do It for You" | Bryan Adams | |
| 29 August | "(Everything I Do) I Do It for You" | Bryan Adams | |
| 5 September | "(Everything I Do) I Do It for You" | Bryan Adams | |
| 12 September | "Hay Wrap" | The Saw Doctors | |
| 19 September | "Don't Cry" | Guns N' Roses | |
| 26 September | "Don't Cry" | Guns N' Roses | |
| 3 October | "I'm Too Sexy" | Right Said Fred | |
| 10 October | "(Everything I Do) I Do It for You" | Bryan Adams | |
| 17 October | "Always Look on the Bright Side of Life" | Monty Python | |
| 24 October | "The Fly" | U2 | |
| 31 October | "The Fly" | U2 | |
| 7 November | "The Fly" | U2 | |
| 14 November | "Zigzagging" | Zig and Zag | |
| 21 November | "Zigzagging" | Zig and Zag | |
| 28 November | "Black or White" | Michael Jackson | |
| 5 December | "Zigzagging" | Zig and Zag | |
| 12 December | "Mysterious Ways" | U2 | |
| 19 December | "Bohemian Rhapsody"/"These Are the Days of Our Lives" | Queen | |
| 26 December | "Bohemian Rhapsody"/"These Are the Days of Our Lives" | Queen | |

- 18 number ones
- Most number ones: Zig and Zag, The Simpsons, U2 (2)
- Most weeks at number one (artist): The Simpsons (13 weeks)
- Most weeks at number one (single): "Everything I Do (I Do it for You)" – Bryan Adams (11 weeks)

== See also ==
- 1991 in music
- List of artists who reached number one in Ireland
