= The Fly (U2 song) =

1991 single by U2

Single by U2

from the album Achtung Baby
- B-side: "Alex Descends into Hell for a Bottle of Milk/Korova 1"
- Released: 21 October 1991
- Recorded: 1990–1991
- Genre: Alternative rock; industrial rock
- Length: 4:29
- Label: Island
- Composer: U2
- Lyricist: Bono
- Producer: Daniel Lanois

U2 singles chronology
"All I Want Is You" (1989)	"The Fly" (1991)	"Mysterious Ways" (1991)

Audio sample
- "The Fly": file; help

Music video
- "The Fly" on YouTube

"The Fly" is a song by Irish rock band U2. It is the seventh track from their seventh album, Achtung Baby (1991), and it was released as the album's first single on 21 October 1991 by Island Records. "The Fly" introduced a more abrasive-sounding U2, as the song featured danceable hip-hop beats, industrial textures, distorted vocals, and an elaborate guitar solo. Lead vocalist Bono described the song as "the sound of four men chopping down The Joshua Tree", due to its departure from the sound that had traditionally characterised the band in the 1980s.

Bono described the song's subject as that of a phone call from someone in Hell who enjoys being there and telling the person on the other end of the line what he has learned. The lyrics are written as a series of aphorisms that Bono collected during the album's recording. The song and its video were also a showcase for "The Fly", a persona that Bono adopted for the Zoo TV Tour, in which he played the part of a stereotypical leather-clad rock star known for wearing large wrap-around sunglasses and strutting around the stage. The song became the band's second number-one single on the UK Singles Chart and was successful among alternative rock radio audiences. Its music video was directed by Jon Klein and Ritchie Smyth, and filmed in Dublin and London.

== Recording and production ==
The writing of "The Fly" began during recording sessions for Achtung Baby at Berlin's Hansa Studios in 1990. The song's origins can be traced to a demo recorded there, which eventually evolved into the B-side "Lady with the Spinning Head". The demo was among the material that was bootlegged from the Berlin sessions and released as Salome: The Axtung Beibi Sessions. In 1991, the album's recording sessions moved to the seaside mansion "Elsinore" in Dalkey, where the group continued to work on the demo. It was troublesome, but it inspired portions of three separate songs, "The Fly" being one of them, and "Ultraviolet (Light My Way)" and "Zoo Station" being the other two. Lead vocalist Bono stated, "One day, [engineer] Flood had a different look in his eye. It started to feel good. We recorded 'The Fly'. Edge's guitar sound was literally like a fly had broken into your brain and was buzzing around."

While recording the song, Bono devised a persona he called "The Fly", and it is from this character's perspective that he wrote the lyrics. He recalled that during the recording sessions, Fintan Fitzgerald, in charge of the band's wardrobe, found a 1970s pair of wraparound blaxploitation sunglasses. Bono would put them on and make everyone laugh whenever they faced a problem or disagreement. He recalls, "I became very interested in these single-line aphorisms. I had been writing them, so I got this character who could say them all, from 'A liar won't believe anybody else' to 'A friend is someone who lets you down,' and that's where 'The Fly' was coming from."

Towards the end of the sessions, U2 were unhappy with the mix of "The Fly", which was selected well in advance of the album's release to be the first single. The band ended up taking the song's mix, placing it on a two-inch multi-track tape, and adding additional vocals and guitars. The Edge and producer Daniel Lanois mixed on top of the previous mix live in the studio, an unusual practice. The Edge says the technique would "make studio professionals laugh" and believes "part of the reason why [the song] sounds so dynamic is because it was a real hands-on performance mix." The guitar sounds in the opening were created by mixing additional guitar on top of the existing guitar, creating a "really crazy natural phasing effect".

Bassist Adam Clayton mentioned that "at that time, it was impossible to know whether U2 fans would follow Bono down this particular path, so [the song] was a real leap of faith. The whole track is a high-energy sonic barrage but with an angelic chorus. It's a classic example of U2 and Eno interfacing."

== Composition ==
"The Fly" is played at a tempo of 108 beats per minute in a 4/4 time signature in the key of E major. The verses follow a chord progression of E–A–Asus_{4}–E. The chorus follows a chord progression of C♯m-E-A. When played live, however, the song is usually played a semitone lower, with the guitar in E♭ tuning, a common technique used by U2 when playing live.

"The Fly" shows a heavier, more abrasive side of U2. The song features hip-hop beats, distorted vocals, an elaborate guitar solo, and hard industrial edge. Allmusic called the song a "whooshing, industrial, beat-driven" piece".

Lyrically, Bono described the song as "a crank call from Hell... but [the caller] likes it there." The caller is Bono's eponymous character, telling the listener what he learned in Hell. Bono sings part of the chorus in a falsetto, utilising what he calls the "Fat Lady" voice, which he also uses on the songs "Lemon" and "Numb".

== Single release ==
Underlined by this new direction, "The Fly" became successful among alternative rock audiences, though it struggled to find airtime on pop radio. The song became U2's second number-one single on the UK Singles Chart, following "Desire". It was notable for ending the record breaking 16-week run at the top of the UK Singles Chart for Bryan Adams' "(Everything I Do) I Do It for You", by entering the Top 75 'straight-in' at number one in late October 1991, but it quickly slid down the chart, as the band's label had intended for the single to be available for a three-week period only and were keen to release two singles (the follow-up being "Mysterious Ways") before Christmas.

In the United States, it only managed number 61 on the Billboard Hot 100, a position later surpassed by all the other Achtung Baby singles. Nevertheless, the song was very successful on modern rock radio, reaching the top of the Modern Rock Tracks chart and number two on the Mainstream Rock Tracks chart. It debuted at number one in Australia, preventing "I'm Too Sexy" by Right Said Fred from reaching number one for a week. It also made number four on the Dutch Top 40. When the covers to "The Fly", and the album's other singles, "Even Better Than the Real Thing", "Who's Gonna Ride Your Wild Horses", and "Mysterious Ways", are arranged, a picture of the band members driving a Trabant is formed. The cassette single was given away as a promotional event on Queen Street, Auckland, New Zealand, to anyone who donned a velcro suit and jumped from a trampoline onto a high velcro wall, thereby becoming a "human fly".

== Music video ==
The music video for "The Fly" shows the band's image change since Rattle and Hum

Parts of the song's video were shot in Dublin in mid-September 1991 by directors Jon Klein and Ritchie Smyth. The rest of the video was shot in London a few weeks later. The promotional video was the first appearance of The Fly character and displayed the band's "new look".

Klein explained "The last three albums have been of a piece in some ways, what we want to do here is start a new chapter. 'The Fly' feels different to me." The video appears on the bonus DVD included with their 2002 compilation The Best of 1990–2000, along with the directors' commentaries.

== Reception ==
Upon the release of Achtung Baby, "The Fly" received generally positive remarks from critics. Elysa Gardner of Rolling Stone commented that "The Fly" was one of many songs on which the Edge was "crafting harder textures and flashing a new arsenal of effects" and that the song features "grinding riffs that bounce off Adam Clayton's thick bass line and echo and embellish Larry Mullen Jr.'s drumming." Furthermore, she noted that Bono was "acknowledging his own potential for hypocrisy and inadequacy" with lyrics such as "Every artist is a cannibal / Every poet is a thief" and that he sounded humbler and more vulnerable. The New York Times praised the song's danceable beat, citing "The Fly" as one example of how it "sounds as if [the band] has taken Bo Diddley and James Brown lessons for its new syncopated dance songs." The publication also highlighted Bono's dynamic range of vocals in the song, pointing out that he "juxtaposes a whisper, a chant and a sweet falsetto to contrast cynicism and glimmers of hope." The Austin Chronicle called the song an "exhilarating rush", while Steve Morse of The Boston Globe said the album "follows the lead" of "The Fly" with a heavier, more industrial-influenced sound. Entertainment Weekly was less receptive to the song, asserting that it "rocks out but goes overboard with the psychedelic foofooraw."

When the Edge was named the 24th greatest guitarist of all time by Rolling Stone in 2003, "The Fly" was dubbed his essential recording. In 1997, readers of Mojo named the song the 38th-best track of the 1990s.

== Live performances ==
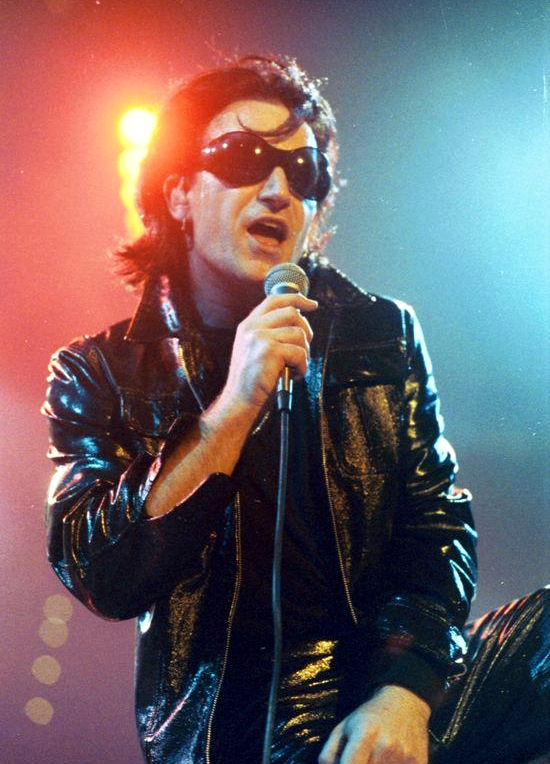
Bono as "The Fly" on the Zoo TV Tour in 1992

"The Fly" made its live debut on 29 February 1992 in Lakeland, Florida on the opening night of the Zoo TV Tour, and it was subsequently played at every show on the tour. For Zoo TV performances, Bono portrayed his "Fly" alter-ego, which he had developed into a leather-clad egomaniac. He described the character's outfit as having Lou Reed's glasses, Elvis Presley's jacket, and Jim Morrison's leather pants. To match the character's dark fashion, Bono dyed his naturally brown hair black. Bono began each concert as "The Fly" and would continue to play the character for most of the first half of the concert. In contrast to the earnest Bono of the 1980s, the character strutted around the stage with "swagger and style", exhibiting mannerisms of an egotistical rock star. Bono often stayed in character away from the tour stage, including for public appearances and when staying in hotels. For performances of the song during Zoo TV, the video monitors flashed a rapidly changing array of textual words and aphorisms. Some of these included "Taste is the enemy of art", "Religion is a club", "Ignorance is bliss", "Watch more TV", "Believe" with letters fading out to leave "lie", and "Everything you know is wrong". Describing the visuals, the Edge said, "'The Fly' is information meltdown—text, sayings, truisms, untruisms, oxymorons, soothsayings, etc., all blasted at high speed, just fast enough so it's impossible to actually read what's being said."

The song was not played on the PopMart Tour, although it was snippetted several times on versions of "Where the Streets Have No Name" and "Discothèque".

The version from the Elevation Tour featured just the Edge on a Gibson Les Paul Custom playing in a higher key with less wah-wah. Bono did not play guitar on these versions, as he usually performed on the heart-shaped stage in the audience. This version is also notable for its added introduction with Bono singing new lyrics over only the Edge's arpeggiated chords. His new lyrics would then involve him reciting parts of the chorus of the song. The Edge did not sing in falsetto during the chorus as he has done on the versions from other tours. This tour also included the first extended ending of the song. The band felt that although the song was good, they hadn't got it exactly right. David Bowie told them, upon hearing it, that it needed to be re-recorded. Bono has also said, "It took us 15 years to really get it right live," implying that the intended product is the version played on the Vertigo Tour.

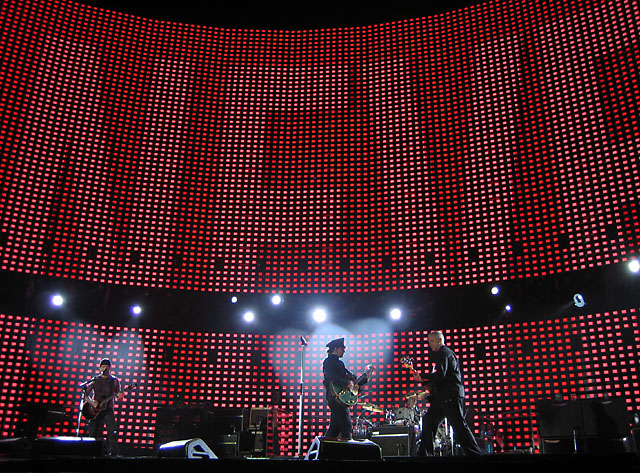
U2 performing "The Fly" on the opening night of the European leg at King Baudouin Stadium in Brussels on 10 June 2005.

For the Vertigo Tour, "The Fly" was played during the Zoo TV-themed encore, and was often re-paired with "Zoo Station" as on Zoo TV. Edge used a Line 6 Variax 700 Acoustic (custom painted to match the tour's red and black colour scheme) and Bono used his signature guitar, the Gretsch Irish Falcon. Larry Mullen Jr. also changed the drum beat to the song on this tour, involving more use of the hi-hat cymbal and snare as opposed to the heavy use of the tom rack on past versions. The Edge again used the extended outro to the song, and Bono often snippeted the Rolling Stones' "(I Can't Get No) Satisfaction" as well as other songs over the outro. The subliminal messages played on the LEDs (though using new, original messages) invoked nostalgia of the Zoo TV Tour.

The song was soundchecked at multiple concerts during the U2 360° Tour and was debuted on 18 June 2011 in Anaheim, California. It was also played at the Glastonbury Festival 2011 with Zoo TV visuals. It was a mainstay on the last leg of the U2 360° Tour.

On the Innocence + Experience Tour, the song was not performed by the band, but rather the Gavin Friday remix version with Bono's original vocals was played over the PA system during the intermission between the first and second halves of the main set. It was bookended by performances of "Until the End of the World" (from the first half) and "Invisible" (from the second half). For this version, the stage's two-sided video screen displays a Berlin Wall-style graphic, on top of which the familiar Zoo TV text phrases and some new phrases appeared.

The song was resurrected in full form (but without Bono's rhythm guitar) on the Experience + Innocence Tour, starting with the 15 October 2018 concert in Milan, Italy. It was subsequently performed 12 more times on that tour.

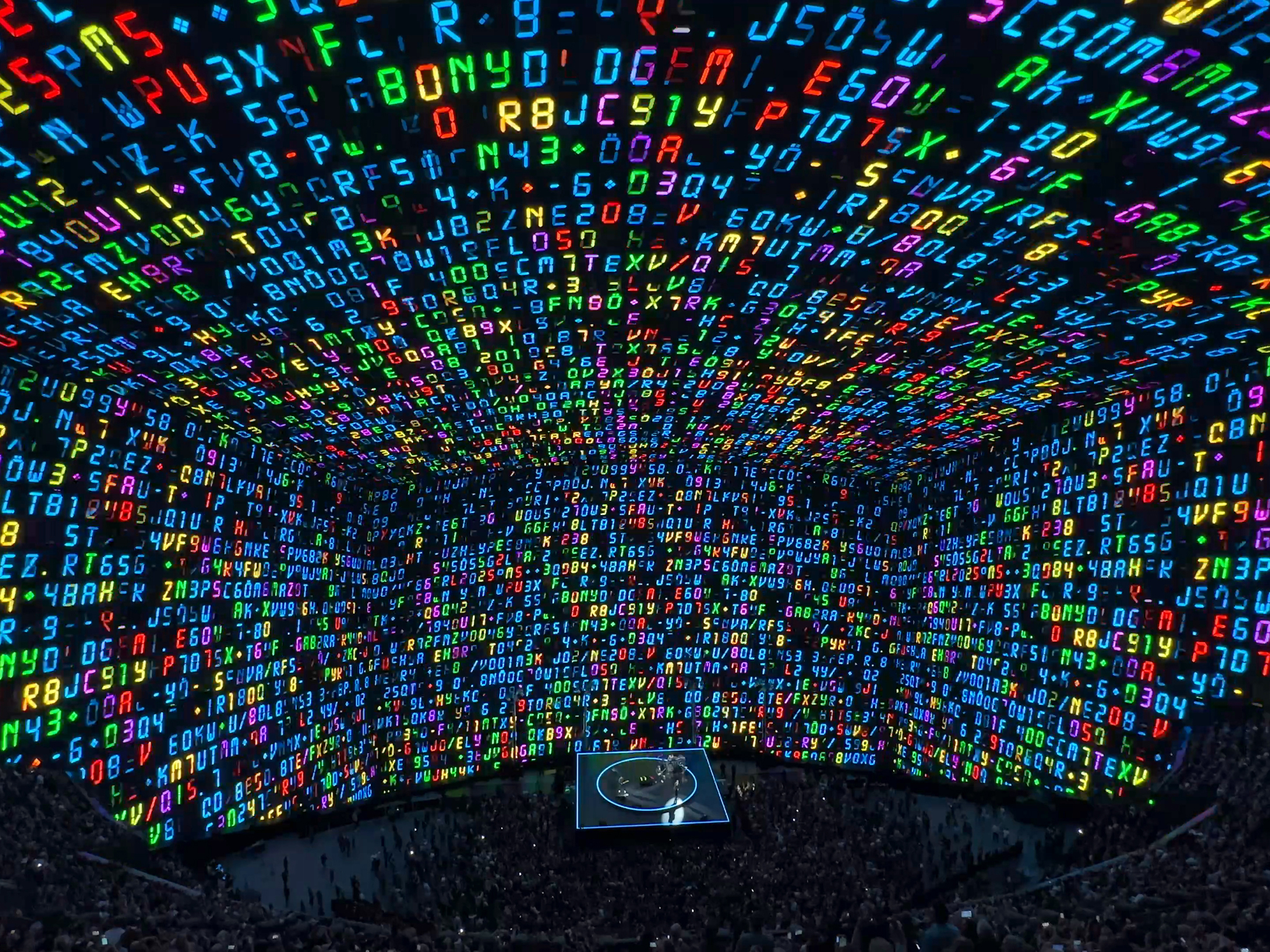
Performances of the song during U2's 2023–2024 concert residency at the Sphere featured an on-screen barrage of multi-coloured characters and an optical illusion that made the venue appear to be cube-shaped.

U2 performed "The Fly" during their 2023–2024 concert residency, U2:UV Achtung Baby Live, at Sphere in the Las Vegas Valley. Performances utilised a presentation similar to the one from the Zoo TV Tour, with a barrage of rapidly flashing words and aphorisms displaying on the venue's LED screen that recalled the work of Jenny Holzer. The imagery underwent a perspective shift, causing the optical illusion that the venue's geometry was cube-shaped rather than spherical. At the song's midpoint, seven-segment digital letters and numbers in a rainbow of colors slowly began to fill up the entire screen from bottom to top, before the ceiling appeared to fall towards the audience.

Live performances of "The Fly" are featured on the Zoo TV: Live from Sydney (1994), Elevation 2001: Live from Boston, and Vertigo 2005: Live from Chicago live DVDs. It also appears on the 2012 fan club compilation U22.

== Alternative versions ==
There are several released versions of this song:

- The album version, which appears on Achtung Baby and some editions of The Best of 1990-2000.
- "The Lounge Fly Mix", which appears as a B-side on the single. This is an alternative take of "The Fly", featuring different lyrics and a more dance-orientated, trip hop sound. A snippet of this version is played over the intro of the music video to "The Fly".
- A live performance from Manchester, England on 19 June 1992 for the Stop Sellafield concert. This was released as a B-Side on the "City of Blinding Lights" single. It is also available on the second disc of the Zoo TV: Live from Sydney DVD as a bonus track.
- Another live performance from the Vertigo Tour, recorded in Chicago in May 2005, which appears on the 2005 U2.COMmunication fan club album. This performance is also available in the Vertigo 2005: Live from Chicago concert film.
- A live version of "The Fly" performed during the Elevation Tour which has a minute and a half intro of Bono singing a new verse and the first part of the chorus, with the Edge playing a different guitar riff. This version of the song appears on the concert film Elevation 2001: Live from Boston.
- "'Baby' The Fly", an early version of the song, was released as part of a "kindergarten" disc for the premium editions of the 20th anniversary reissue of Achtung Baby.

== B-sides ==
The single was backed with the following B-sides:

- "Alex Descends into Hell for a Bottle of Milk/Korova 1": a music piece by Bono and the Edge, taken from the score for the Royal Shakespeare Company's production of A Clockwork Orange. This was the only part of the score which was officially released. The author of the original book, Anthony Burgess, was reportedly very unsatisfied with the soundtrack. This song was featured on the Japanese soundtrack to the 1995 movie Johnny Mnemonic.
- "The Lounge Fly Mix"

== Covers ==
Gavin Friday reworked the song for the 2011 tribute album AHK-toong BAY-bi Covered. He said, "The Edge rang me up and said, 'Nobody wants to do 'The Fly' – they're all afraid of it.' I think it's because it has its own essence, sonically. It was the lead single and the point of reinvention. U2 said it best: it was the sound of four men chopping down the Joshua Tree. I remember seeing them working on Achtung Baby in its early stages. I just put a rocket up their asses and said, 'Go for it.'"

== Track listings ==
7-inch single; UK and Australian cassette single
No.	Title	Writer(s)	Producer	Length
1.	"The Fly"	U2	Daniel Lanois	4:29
2.	"Alex Descends into Hell for a Bottle of Milk/Korova 1"	Bono and the Edge	Paul Barrett	3:37

12-inch and CD single; US and Canadian cassette single
No.	Title	Writer(s)	Producer	Length
1.	"The Fly"	U2	Lanois	4:29
2.	"Alex Descends into Hell for a Bottle of Milk/Korova 1"	Bono and the Edge	Barrett	3:37
3.	"The Lounge Fly Mix"	U2	Lanois	6:28

== Personnel ==
- Bono - lead and backing vocals
- The Edge - guitar, keyboard
- Adam Clayton - bass
- Larry Mullen Jr. - drums, percussion

== Charts ==
=== Weekly charts ===
Chart (1991)	Peak position
Australia (ARIA)	1
Austria (Ö3 Austria Top 40)	5
Belgium (Ultratop 50 Flanders)	9
Canada (The Record)	3
Canada Top Singles (RPM)	16
Denmark (IFPI)	2
Europe (Eurochart Hot 100)	2
Europe (European Hit Radio)	5
Finland (Suomen virallinen lista)	2
France (SNEP)	6
Germany (GfK)	5
Ireland (IRMA)	1
Italy (Musica e dischi)	1
Luxembourg (Radio Luxembourg)	2
Netherlands (Dutch Top 40)	4
Netherlands (Single Top 100)	5
New Zealand (Recorded Music NZ)	1
Norway (VG-lista)	1
Portugal (AFP)	1
Spain (AFYVE)	1
Sweden (Sverigetopplistan)	3
Switzerland (Schweizer Hitparade)	3
UK Singles (Official Charts)	1
UK Airplay (Music Week)	1
US Billboard Hot 100	61
US Alternative Airplay (Billboard)	1
US Dance Singles Sales (Billboard)	44
US Mainstream Rock (Billboard)	2

=== Year-end charts ===
Chart (1991)	Position
Australia (ARIA)	48
Belgium (Ultratop)	100
Europe (Eurochart Hot 100)	81
Europe (European Hit Radio)	90
Netherlands (Dutch Top 40)	71
Netherlands (Single Top 100)	56
New Zealand (RIANZ)	35
Sweden (Topplistan)	35
UK Singles (OCC)	54

== Certifications ==
Region	Certification	Certified units/sales
Australia (ARIA)	Gold	35,000^{^}
New Zealand (RMNZ)	Platinum	10,000^{*}
United Kingdom (BPI)	Silver	200,000^{^}
^{*} Sales figures based on certification alone.^{^} Shipments figures based on certification alone.

== Release history ==
Region	Date	Format(s)	Label(s)	Ref(s).
United States	9 October 1991	Radio	Island	
Australia	21 October 1991	7-inch vinyl; 12-inch vinyl; CD; cassette	Island	
Japan	21 October 1991	Mini-CD; maxi-CD	Island	
United Kingdom	21 October 1991	7-inch vinyl; 12-inch vinyl; CD; cassette	Island	
United States	21 October 1991	CD	Island	

== See also ==
- List of covers of U2 songs - The Fly
- List of number-one singles in Australia during the 1990s
- List of number-one singles of 1991 (Ireland)
- List of number-one singles in 1991 (New Zealand)
- List of number-one hits in Norway
- List of number-one singles of 1991 (Spain)
- List of number-one singles from the 1990s (UK)
- Number one modern rock hits of 1991
