= Innocence + Experience Tour =

2015 concert tour by U2

- World tour by U2
- Promotional poster for the tour
- Location: North America; Europe
- Associated album: Songs of Innocence
- Start date: 14 May 2015
- End date: 7 December 2015
- Legs: 2
- No. of shows: 76
- Attendance: 1,286,416
- Box office: $152.2 million

U2 concert chronology
- U2 360° Tour (2009–2011); Innocence + Experience Tour (2015); The Joshua Tree Tour 2017 (2017)

The Innocence + Experience Tour (styled as iNNOCENCE + eXPERIENCE Tour) was a worldwide concert tour by the Irish rock band U2. Staged in support of the band's 2014 album Songs of Innocence, the tour visited arenas throughout 2015. It was U2's first time playing arenas since 2005–2006 on their Vertigo Tour. Comprising two legs and 76 concerts, the Innocence + Experience Tour began on 14 May 2015 in Vancouver, Canada. It visited North America from May through July, and Europe from September through December. Shows were predominantly booked in pairs for each market.

Concerts were structured around a loose autobiographical narrative of "innocence" passing into "experience", with a fixed set of songs for the first half of each show and a varying second half, separated by an intermission—a first for U2 concerts. The stage spanned the length of the venue floor and comprised three sections: a rectangular segment representing "innocence"; a smaller circular B-stage representing "experience"; and a connecting walkway to represent the transition between the two themes. A 96-foot-long (29 m) double-sided video screen was suspended above and parallel to the walkway; the structure featured an interior catwalk between the video screens, allowing the band members to perform amidst the video projections. For the tour, U2's sound system was moved to the venue ceilings and arranged in an oval in hopes of improving acoustics by evenly distributing sound throughout the arena.

The Innocence + Experience Tour was well received by critics. According to Billboard, the North American leg of the tour grossed US$76.2 million from 36 sold-out concerts. In total, the tour grossed US$152.2 million from 1.29 million attendees. The final date of the tour, one of two Paris shows rescheduled due to the 13 November 2015 attacks in the city, was filmed for the video Innocence + Experience: Live in Paris and broadcast on the American television network HBO. In 2018, U2 reprised the tour's autobiographical narrative and stage setup for its sequel, the Experience + Innocence Tour.

== Background ==
U2's previous tour, the U2 360° Tour, visited stadiums in Europe, North America, Asia, Oceania, Africa and South America from 2009 to 2011 and comprised 110 shows. The concerts featured the band playing "in the round" on a circular stage, allowing the audience to surround them on all sides. To accommodate the stage configuration, a large four-legged structure nicknamed "The Claw" was built above the stage, with the sound system and a cylindrical, expanding video screen on top of it. At 164 feet (50 m) tall, it was the largest stage ever constructed. U2 360° concluded in July 2011 as the highest-grossing concert tour (grossing $736 million) and the most-attended concert tour (selling 7.3 million tickets).

On 9 September 2014, after a five-and-a-half-year gap between records, U2 announced their thirteenth studio album, Songs of Innocence, at an Apple product launch event. It was released digitally the same day to all iTunes Store customers at no cost. The release made the album available to over 500 million iTunes customers in what Apple CEO Tim Cook called "the largest album release of all time." Songs of Innocence revisits the group members' youth in Ireland in the 1970s, touching on childhood memories, loves, and losses, while paying tribute to their musical inspirations. Lead vocalist Bono described it as "the most personal album we've written." It received mixed reviews, and some critics and consumers were critical of the digital release strategy; the album was automatically added to users' iTunes accounts without their consent, which for many, triggered an unprompted download to their devices.

== Development ==
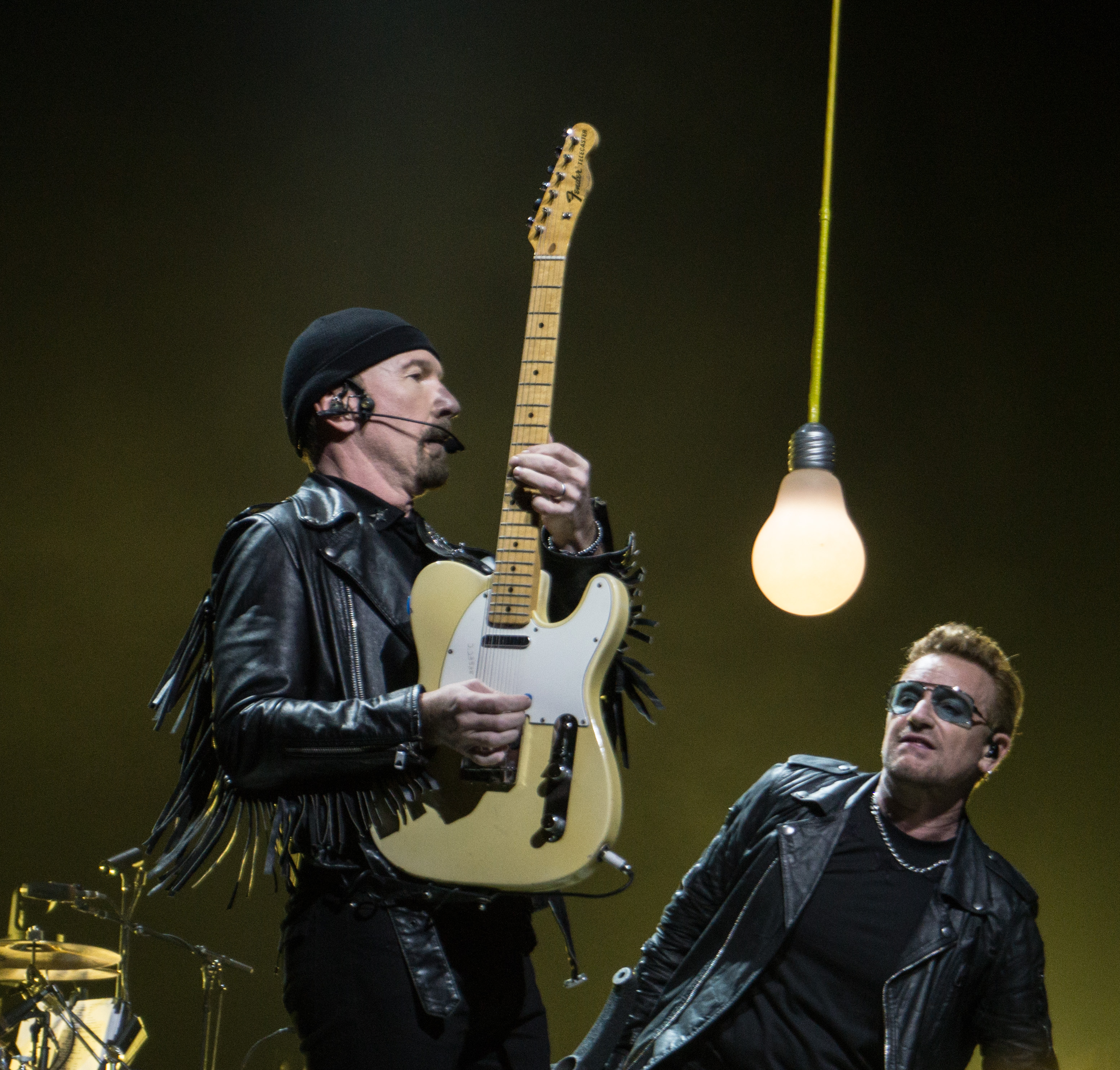
The idea for the dangling light bulb on the Innocence + Experience Tour was conceived by Bono (right) during U2's previous concert tour, the U2 360° Tour.

As early as opening night of the U2 360° Tour in June 2009, Bono told his friend/band consultant Gavin Friday that their next tour would have to be more intimate. During U2 360°, Bono and long-time tour designer Willie Williams first discussed ideas for their next live venture. One of Bono's suggestions was to begin future shows with the band performing underneath a single light bulb, in contrast to the massive stage structure underneath which they played during the 360° Tour.

Williams was aware that U2's long-time stage designer Mark Fisher was battling an illness and did not have long to live. As a result, Williams invited stage designer Es Devlin to the band's creative team in February 2013. The two previously collaborated in 2009 for the American theatre leg of Lady Gaga's Monster Ball Tour and in 2012 for Complicité's production of The Master and Margarita. Williams also invited Ric Lipson, Fisher's colleague at the design firm Stufish Entertainment Architects, based on positive experiences with him on past projects.

The first production meeting between U2 and their creative team for the Innocence + Experience Tour was held in March 2013 in the South of France, over what Williams called a "mad weekend". During this first meeting, Williams, Devlin, and Lipson created a scrapbook that served as the "style guide" for the tour's presentation, consisting of cut-outs, drawings, and paintings. Although Songs of Innocence was still in progress at the time and did not yet have a title, the autobiographical narrative that would characterise the album was already a driving idea for their tour. The band wanted to tell the story of their adolescence in Dublin in the 1970s and how they were "trying to figure out how they fit into the often violent and disrupted world outside" their homes. The manifesto for the tour was summarised by two phrases: "I can't change the world, but I can change the world in me", and "I can change the world, but I can't change the world in me." The first is a lyric from the band's 1981 song "Rejoice" and represents the mindset of a teenage Bono feeling powerless to make a difference in a world plagued by the Troubles, who instead views personal psychological changes as a possibility; the second phrase represents the modern-day realisation that the same person could make a difference in the world through philanthropic efforts but still struggle with the complexities of internal change. Devlin said, "The space between these two statements is the territory of the album and of the show." The band intended to stage shows in pairs and alternate the setlist between "innocence" and "experience" motifs night to night. Williams said, "The artfulness in this tour is in the ideas, not the hardware".

"But the conceit here is to consistently merge the two stages, in a sense, and to engage the entire space visually, sonically and thematically, through the interplay of many other opposites extrapolated from the central one. These include past and present, obscurity and fame, peace and war, audience and band, punk and statesman, grass-roots activism and corporate philanthropy, live action and animation. Basically, where the band saw a perceived division, it tried to erode it."

— Ben Ratliff of The New York Times

The band and their creative team focused initial meetings on what they wanted to communicate to the audience and how to make them feel. After defining the thematic arc of the show, the stage design began to take shape. Devlin explained the creative team's approach in designing the multifaceted stage: "We wanted to respond to the geometry of an arena: all that oval air, how to energize the whole mass of air in those spaces so that the atmosphere reaches everyone in the room equally." Williams found it beneficial to collaborate with two separate firms, Devlin's company and Stufish, on the stage because of their contrasting work methods. Devlin's team created physical models, while Lipson's team made animations and collaborated with Tait on construction drawings. Fisher was unable to physically attend any meetings after the first one, but did occasionally videoconference with the creative team via Skype. In the final meeting he attended before his death in June 2013, Bono asked the team to think of an object that could symbolise U2 and be incorporated into the stage design. Fisher suggested a cross, an idea that would be implemented into some of the stage's lighting fixtures.

Many of the band's original ideas were too costly to realise. One such proposal was to have four "flying rooms" that would move around the arena and feature internal projections of the band members; the idea was instead re-imagined as the video imagery of a young Bono attempting to write a song in his bedroom. Another discarded idea was to explode a giant light bulb over the B-stage to release junk and furniture from the 1970s; this was also re-imagined through video imagery, with a digital depiction of a light bulb smashing to release a tsunami. Williams and other staff had wanted to remove the backline bunkers concealing crew and equipment on stage, but eventually conceded to keep them for aesthetic reasons. Unable to shrink the bunkers any further due to the amount of resources needed to produce U2's concerts, Williams took a thematic approach to the problem by selecting a main stage that would harken back to band's "innocent" years; it is the same main stage that was used on their 1987 Joshua Tree Tour. The creative brief for the Innocence + Experience Tour was signed off in December 2013, with the intent to begin the tour in early 2014, but it was ultimately delayed until the following year, leading to an extended design period of two years. The creative team regrouped in July 2014 to resume development of the tour.

When U2's creative team assembled on 8 February 2015 in Lititz, Pennsylvania, they discovered the production as designed at that point would require 225,000 lb (102,000 kg) of equipment to be hung from venue ceilings, surpassing their 180,000-pound (82,000 kg) limit. At that time, the sound system was based on Clair Global's i-5 loudspeaker model and weighed 78,600 lb (35,700 kg) in total. U2's long-time sound designer Joe O'Herlihy produced a revised design using the company's Cohesion CO-12 speaker model, bringing the weight of the sound system down to 44,200 lb (20,000 kg). Although production on the CO-12 had not been scheduled to start until September 2015, Clair was able to produce the speaker model in time for the tour's launch in May.

== Set design and show production ==
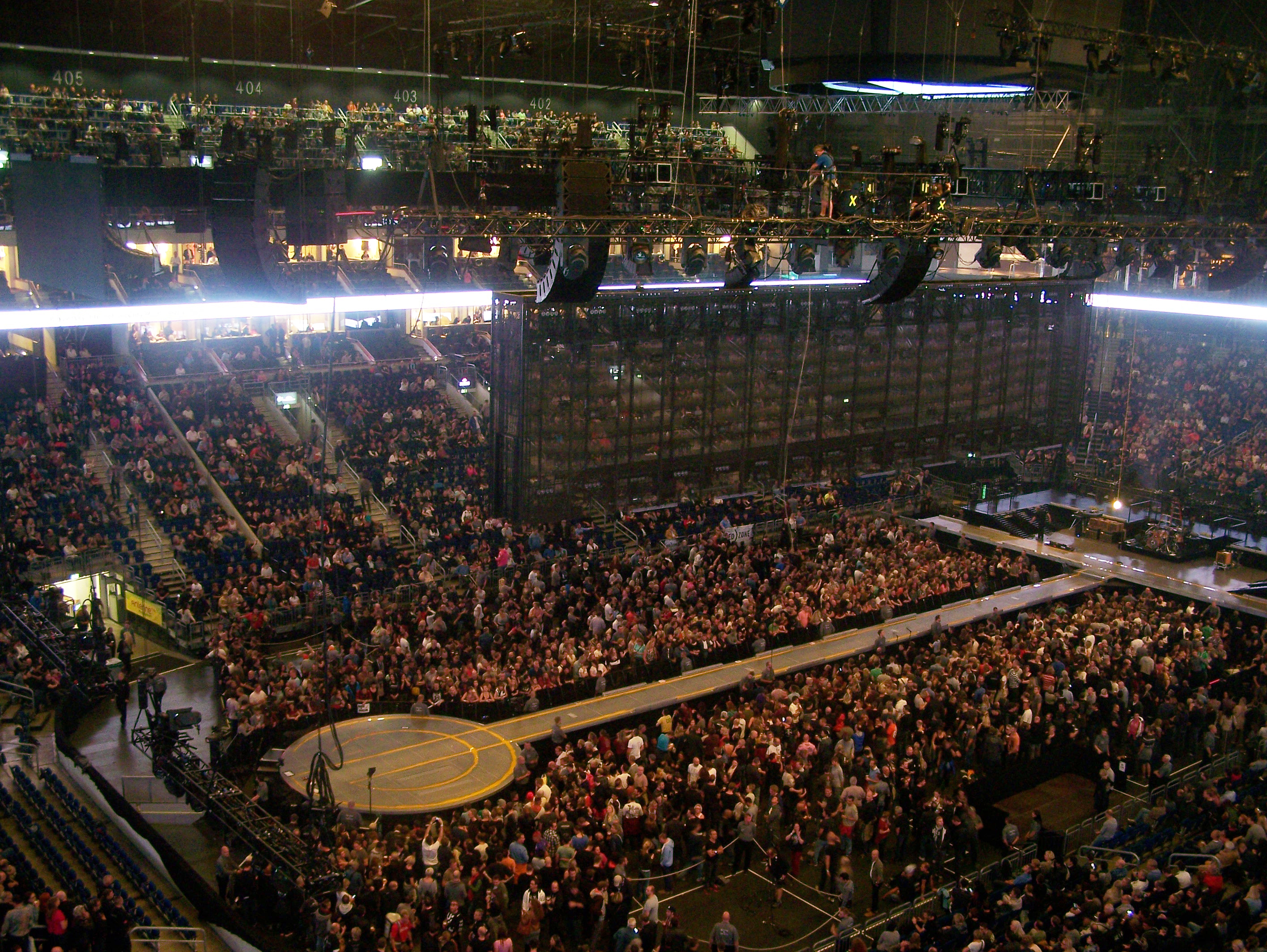
The stage comprised a rectangular main stage (right), a circular B-stage (left), a connecting walkway, and a large video screen suspended above the walkway.

The set was designed by Ric Lipson and Es Devlin under the creative direction of Willie Williams. The stage spanned the length of the venue floor and comprised multiple sections. At one end of the venue was the rectangular main stage, which illuminated as an "I" to represent "innocence" and measured 60 feet (18 m) wide by 32 feet (9.8 m) deep, with the performance area 35 feet (11 m) wide by 22 feet (6.7 m) deep. At the other end was a smaller circular B-stage, which illuminated as an "e" to represent "experience" and measured 24 feet (7.3 m) diametrically. Connecting the two stages was a 120-foot-long (37 m) walkway intended to represent the transition between their two themes. A flip-up piano was built into the B-stage, with the lift designed to unfold the instrument 90 degrees like a book opening, rather than raise it directly upwards.

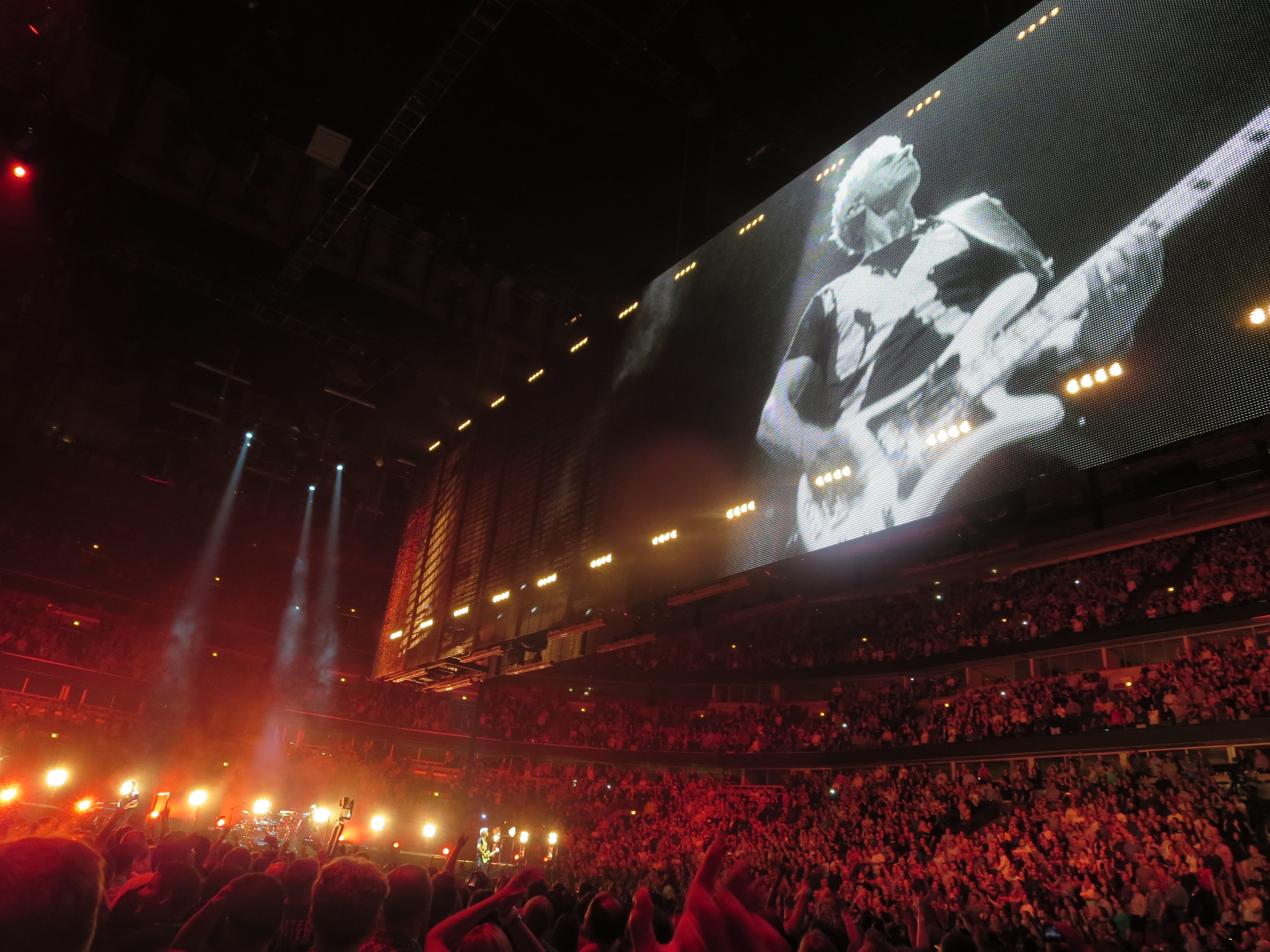
The centerpiece of the set was a 96-foot-long "video cage" that was suspended over the walkway connecting the main stage and B-stage.

A long, rectangular "video cage" was suspended above and parallel to the walkway. The structure, provided by SACO Technologies in conjunction with PRG Nocturne, featured LED video screens on the two largest faces measuring 96 feet (29 m) wide by 22.5 feet (6.9 m) tall, each one comprising 240 SACO V-Thru semi-transparent video panels. The panels' cabling was contained within the support rails, which were placed 6 feet (1.8 m) apart. An interior catwalk between the video screens, accessible by a kinetic staircase, allowed the band members to perform amidst the video projections. The entire structure was supported by eight 3,000-kilogram (6,600 lb) Tait Nav Hoists that could vertically move it by 7 metres (23 ft) in 30 seconds. The walkway and video screen were collectively referred to by U2 and their creative team as the "divide", as they bisected the venue. When lowered to the walkway, it acted as a barrier separating audience members on opposing halves of the venue. The band saw the "divide" as a metaphor for the tribal lines separating cities and for how the band's own actions were occasionally divisive amongst their fans. The video screen was originally supposed to be 24 feet longer to match the length of the catwalk, but combined with the already-extensive weight of the other equipment, it would have made touring impractical. In total, 172,000 pounds (78,000 kg) of equipment was rigged from the venue ceilings, making it, in Lipson's words, "one of the heaviest arena shows ever".

Due to the amount of space covered by the staging and the band members often being spread out, a traditional public address system front-loaded on one end of the arena was deemed inadequate. O'Herlihy worked with Clair Global to rethink how to create an arena sound system. As a result, U2's sound system was moved to the venue ceilings and arranged in an oval. The system featured 12 arrays of Clair Cohesion CO-12 speakers, each array holding ten 132-pound (60 kg) speaker cabinets. For down fill and front fill, eight arrays of Clair Cohesion CO-8 speakers were hung, each array holding four 53-pound (24 kg) cabinets. For bass, there were eight arrays of three Clair Cohesion CP-218 subwoofers. Additionally, 24 Clair i-3 cabinets were hung to project sound to the rear of the main stage. In total, more than 200 cabinets were used. The band hoped the new arrangement would improve acoustics by evenly distributing sound throughout the arena. O'Herlihy said, "It allows us to project the music without it being enormously loud." Williams said that a positive side effect of the speakers' relocation was the reduction of visual clutter on the stage. The front of house mixing station was positioned within the audience seating, from which O'Herlihy operated a DiGiCo SD7 digital mixing console, with a second one mirroring his work for redundancy in case of failure.

The amount of potential performance areas on stage, as well as the size of the video cage, dictated the lighting system. Three trusses were suspended over the main stage housing just 16 lighting fixtures, with additional trusses lengthwise following the edge of the arena floor. The most heavily used lighting fixtures were PRG Best Boys and Bad Boys, providing both wash and spot lighting. Wishing to minimize the amount of fixtures used, Williams chose them because of their output and throw distance. Due to the lack of a traditional "front of house", Williams was concerned how he would handle spotlights but ultimately settled on using a ring of truss Bad Boy spotlights with the brightest bulbs that could be used without melting. The lighting of the main stage was meant to evoke a punk rock club from the late 1970s and early 1980s, a time and place that provided the thematic setting for the beginning of the Innocence + Experience shows. Additional lighting was built into the underside of the video cage.

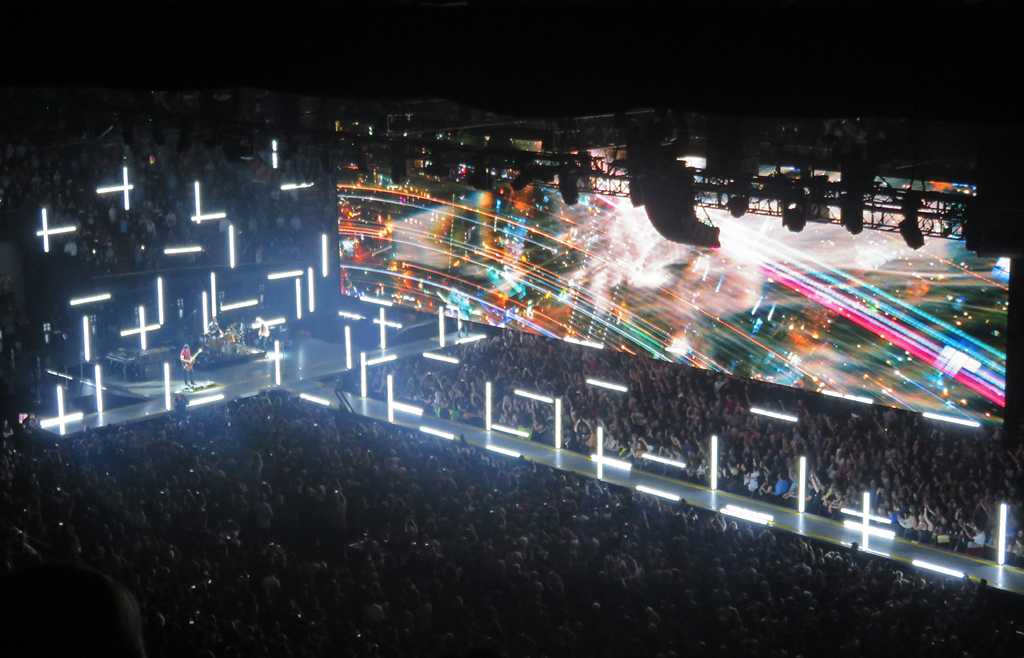
The set's "caged tube" light fixtures, meant to resemble fluorescent lights, appeared to form crosses when oriented horizontally and vertically.

Among the set's signature lighting fixtures were "caged tubes", which were meant to resemble fluorescent lights found in underpasses or public bathrooms. Williams originally wanted to use actual fluorescent lights, but was convinced otherwise due to the risks of radio frequency (RF) interference that they posed. Instead, white LED facsimiles were used, with each one having only one circuit and one color. The tubes were left on continuously for the first half hour of the show to help define the punk club setting. Later when the video cage was lowered, additional tubes along the walkway were illuminated to create an intimidating underpass. Towards the end of the show, the tubes appeared in both horizontal and vertical orientations, creating crosses from certain perspectives in the venue.

The concerts were digitally recorded by 28 HD cameras, both human operated and robotic, collecting about 500 gigabytes of audio/video per hour—roughly a terabyte (TB) per show. To handle their data storage needs, U2 used several products from EMC Corporation, the first time the company had a musical client. To archive uncompressed footage and access it on-demand during the shows' production, the tour staff used an EMC VNXe3200 portable flash storage unit worth about US$25,000. It was configured with 22.9 TB of storage but was expandable up to 450 TB. After each show, tour staff used an EMC Data Domain 2500 system to back up footage. With storage up to 6.6 petabytes and an hourly throughput of 13.4 TB, the Data Domain system could complete a nightly backup before the crew disassembled the stage. On previous tours, U2 relied on USB flash drives for storage. Video imagery was loaded onto the set's video screens with two d3 Technologies d3 4×4 media servers. Due to the need to load video on the fly, all storage was locally networked, as a cloud storage configuration would have increased latency. EMC's solution satisfied certain requirements dictated by the band, such as: mobility through a flight case form factor; expandable storage; and the capability to handle the large data loads from many cameras.

The video content was provided by two artists: Oliver Jeffers, a children's book illustrator, created the chalk drawings and collages for the "innocence" act of the show; Jeff Frost, a digital artist from Utah, created the imagery for the "experience" act. After Williams approached Frost about how to represent the "neural net of humanity" in the show, the artist traveled to CERN's Large Hadron Collider in Switzerland to capture footage of particles colliding. Frost also created time-lapse video of desert landscapes, optical illusions painted on abandoned houses, and cityscapes. One of his techniques is what he called "reverse light painting", which involves moving a camera in front of lights instead of the inverse. Frost developed the visuals based on initial suggestions from Williams and daily feedback while testing the images in rehearsals over several weeks.

Several other personnel were involved in the production of the tour. Sparky Risk and Alex Murphy serving as lighting directors. Jake Berry reprised his role as U2's long-time production manager for the tour. Also on staff were video director Stefaan "Smasher" Desmedt and video content producer Ben Nicholson. The set was built by Tait.

== Planning, itinerary, and ticketing ==
After months of speculation about a tour, the band announced the Innocence + Experience Tour on 3 December 2014. Initially, 44 shows were scheduled in 19 cities across North America and Europe beginning in May 2015, with plans for shows in their native Dublin announced but not finalized at the time. Dates were predominantly booked in pairs for each market. Pre-sale tickets for the tour were offered to U2 fan club members on 4 December 2014 before going on sale to the general public on 8 December. In contrast to the U2 360° Tour, on the Innocence + Experience Tour, U2 played arenas, their first time since their Vertigo Tour from 2005 to 2006. Initial dates for the tour sold out, prompting Live Nation to extend it with additional dates. A sponsorship deal with cloud computing company Salesforce.com, reportedly worth $12 million, was announced in March 2015.

The group spent a month rehearsing at Pacific Coliseum in Vancouver prior to the tour's opening show in the city on 14 May 2015. During this period, they decided to abandon their plans to alternate between "innocence" and "experience" setlists from show to show, fearing that concertgoers would be disappointed by the omission of certain songs on a given night.

On 9 September 2015, the band announced a six-date extension to the tour's European leg, scheduling two shows in Belfast and four shows in Dublin. To fit the small venues available in Ireland, the group were forced to reconfigure the show's production. The band donated €2 million from Irish ticket sales to Music Generation, a local music education programme for children. In total, 76 shows were scheduled for the tour.

=== Complications ===
On 16 November 2014, Bono was injured in a "high energy bicycle accident" in Central Park in New York City. He suffered fractures of his shoulder blade, humerus, orbit, and pinky finger, requiring five hours of surgery at NewYork–Presbyterian Hospital/Weill Cornell Medical Center's Emergency Department. Bono said he was uncertain that he would ever be able to play guitar again. The injury forced the band to cancel a headlining appearance at KROQ Almost Acoustic Christmas, as well as a week-long residency as the musical guest on The Tonight Show Starring Jimmy Fallon.

Days before the 14 May 2015 tour opener in Vancouver, drummer Larry Mullen Jr.'s father died in Ireland, putting the status of the show in doubt. Mullen flew home for the funeral and returned to Vancouver in time for the concert. On opening night, during the band's performance of the final song "I Still Haven't Found What I'm Looking For", guitarist the Edge fell off the stage catwalk while playing guitar and proceeding to the exit. He narrowly escaped injury, only scraping his arm.

Dennis Sheehan, the group's tour manager since 1982, died in Los Angeles on 27 May 2015 while on tour with the band. He was 68 years old. Bono said: "We've lost a family member, we're still taking it in. He wasn't just a legend in the music business, he was a legend in our band. He is irreplaceable."

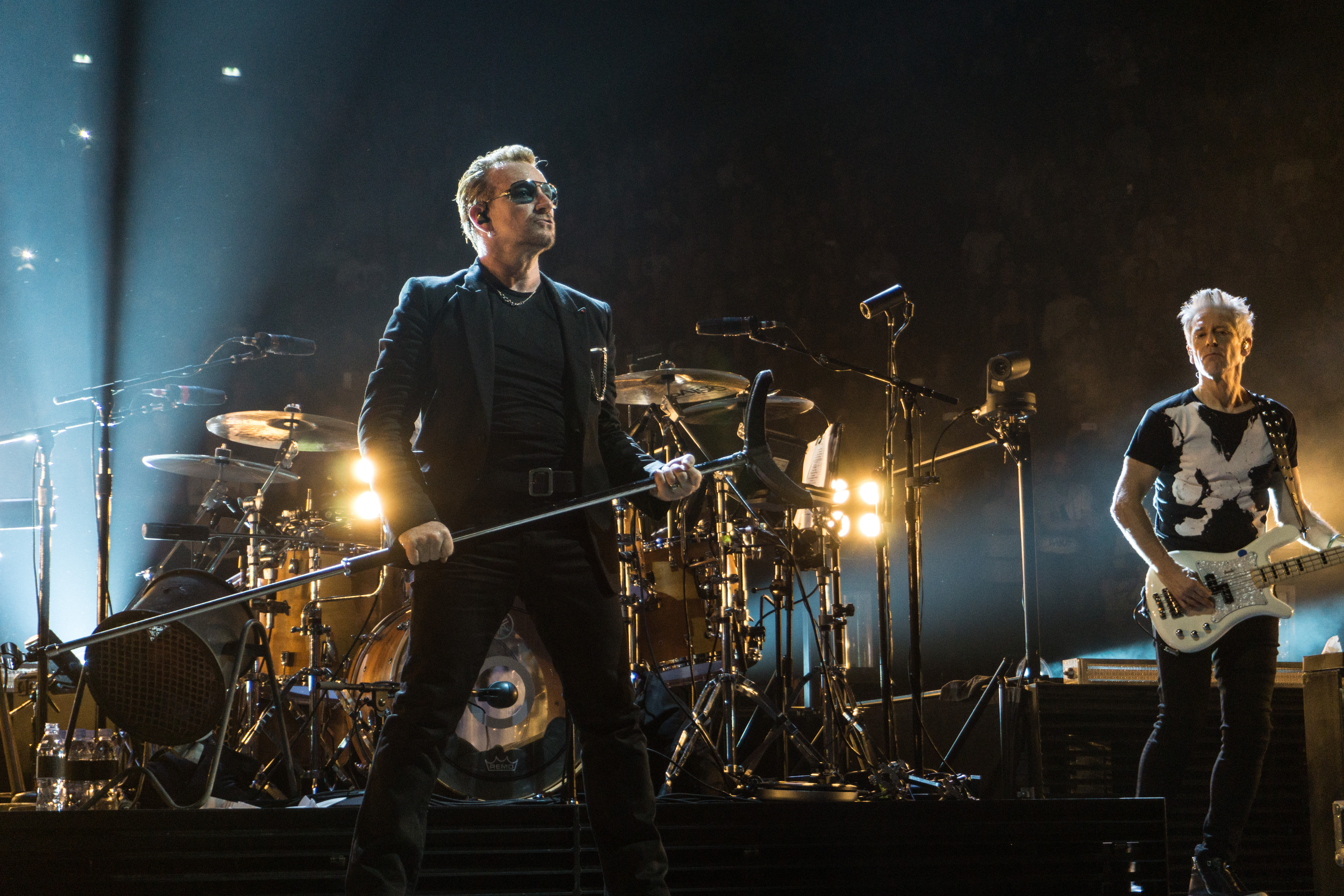
U2 performing in Paris on 7 December 2015, the final date of the tour. It was one of two Paris concerts rescheduled after the November attacks.

The group's 20 September 2015 show in Stockholm was postponed until later that week after an arena security breach that required police to evacuate the building and search for a suspect. Less than two months later, attacks in Paris on 13 November forced the postponement of two of U2's shows in the city scheduled for 14 and 15 November; they were rescheduled for 6 and 7 December, making them the final dates of the European leg of the tour. According to tour producer Arthur Fogel, "minimal" refunds were requested (3,000 of the 34,000 tickets sold). The rescheduling posed logistical challenges for the band, as the tour was supposed to end in Dublin more than a week prior to the new Paris dates, and crew members and equipment had been set to disperse. Arena security was bolstered for the rescheduled shows. Writing about U2's plan to return to a Paris still on high alert, Don Kaplan of the New York Daily News said: "The Dublin band, born in the crucible of violence that gripped Ireland in the 1970s and '80s, has long collaborated with other musicians, artists, celebrities, and politicians to address issues concerning poverty, disease, and social injustice. That they've now opted to challenge terrorism and fear should surprise absolutely no one."

=== Sequel tour ===
U2 originally began the Innocence + Experience Tour with the intent to tour in two phases, one with material primarily taken from Songs of Innocence and one with material that would eventually comprise its follow-up, Songs of Experience. Bassist Adam Clayton said, "By the time we finished the Innocence tour and came full circle to focus on the [Songs of Experience] album, it was clear we weren't going to be able to flip it really quickly into the Experience side of the material and put it right back out on tour." When asked about plans to continue the Innocence + Experience Tour after the Joshua Tree Tour 2017, the Edge said: "We feel like that tour wasn't finished. So right now, we'd love to finish that tour. I would imagine it's gonna be with very similar production components... But we like that tour and that project wasn't completed. It is still alive in our minds creatively." On 1 November 2017, the band announced the Experience + Innocence Tour as a sequel to the Innocence + Experience Tour, with concerts in North America and Europe in 2018 to support Songs of Experience.

== Show overview ==
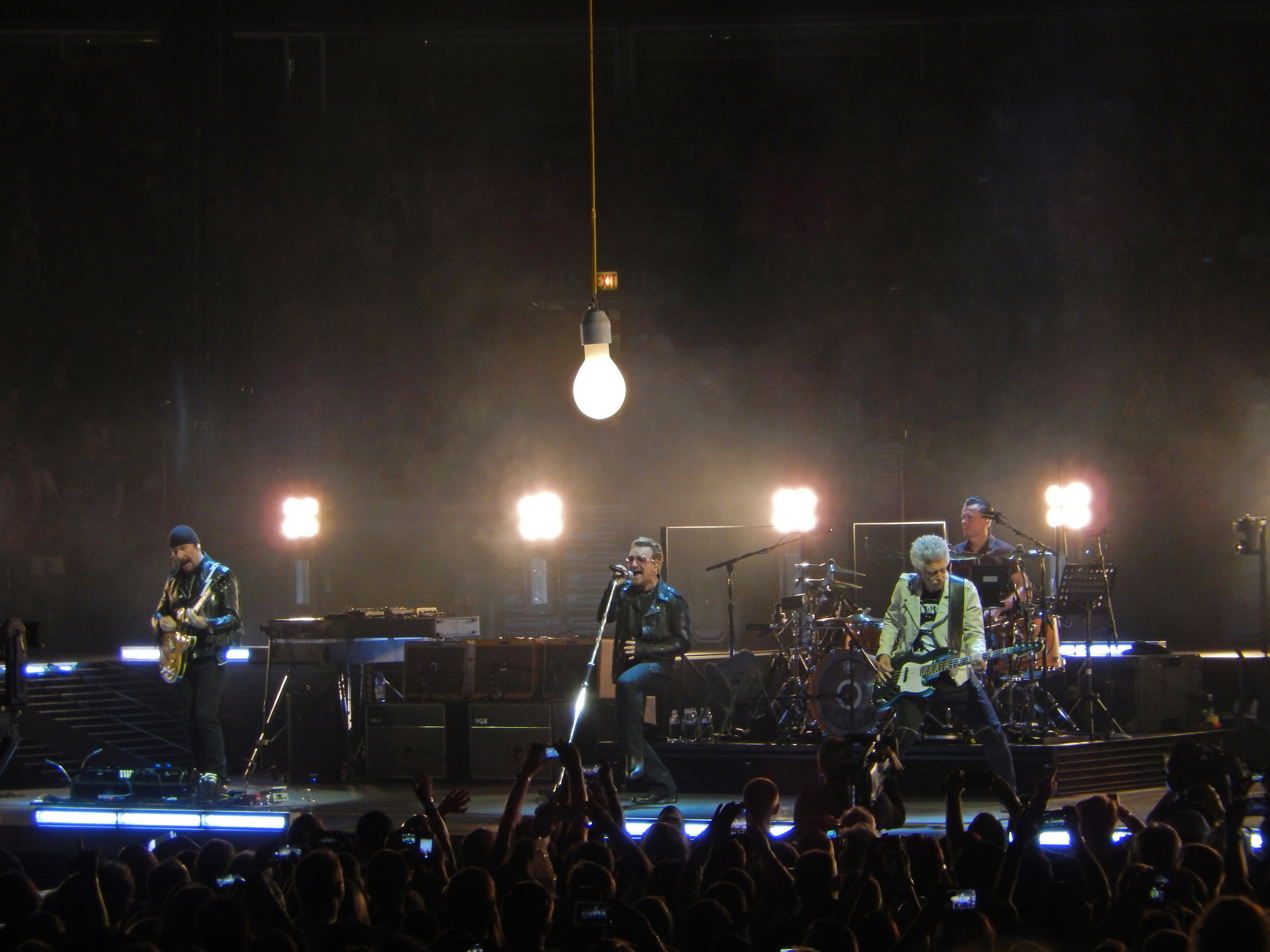
U2 opened shows on the tour performing under a single dangling light bulb, a metaphor for the band's innocence.

Shows on the Innocence + Experience Tour consisted of two acts separated by a brief intermission—a first for U2 concerts–with an encore at the end. The shows began with the band taking the stage accompanied by "Beat on the Brat" by American band Ramones playing over the public address system. After four shows, the song was replaced by Patti Smith's "People Have the Power". The first act began with U2 performing "The Miracle (of Joey Ramone)", followed by a mix of the group's earliest tracks (such as "Gloria", "The Electric Co.", and "Out of Control") and then "Vertigo" and "I Will Follow". These songs were played underneath a single dangling light bulb, which was inspired by the decor of Bono's childhood bedroom and was intended as a metaphor for the intimacy and innocence of the band's early years. The Edge says this portion of the show represented "U2 stripped back in the innocence moment of the band, referring to those early years where we formed and influenced by the music of the late 1970 and early 1980s, post-punk and punk music." After four songs, the band more explicitly explored its adolescence, beginning with "Iris (Hold Me Close)", which Bono wrote about his mother who died when he was 14 years old. The set's video screen showed old home video footage of her intercut with visuals of stars, matching the song's lyrics that liken her influence on Bono over time to the light of long-dead star.

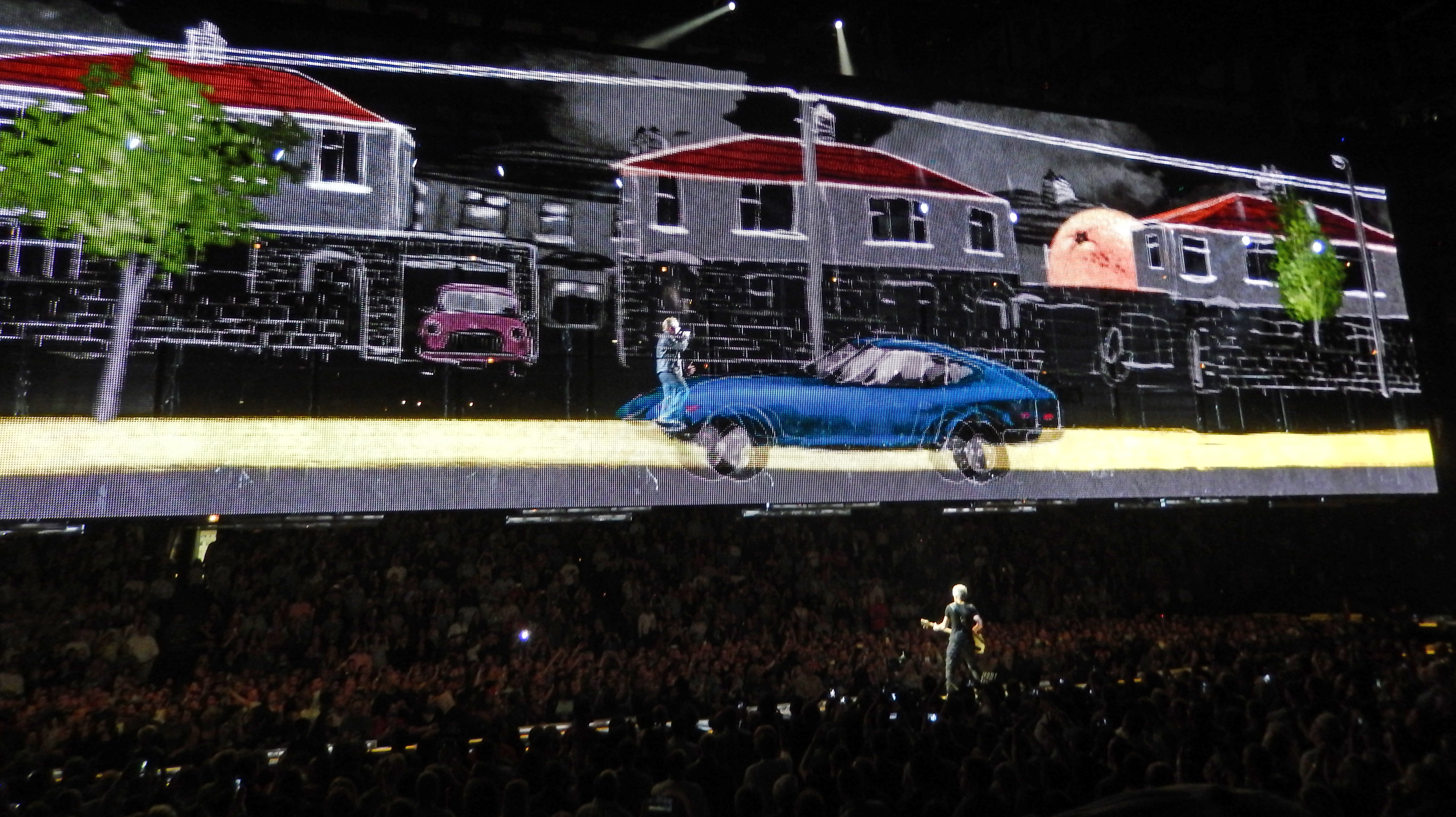
During "Cedarwood Road", Bono performed inside the video screen, giving the appearance of him walking down his childhood street.

For "Cedarwood Road", written about the Dublin street on which Bono grew up, the singer ascended into the video cage and performed amidst animation of his childhood street, giving the appearance of him walking down it. The visuals transitioned to an interior depiction of Bono's childhood home for "Song for Someone", which was written as a love song for his wife Ali. The visuals featured Bono's son portraying a childhood version of the singer trying to write a song. Afterwards, two songs revisiting the Troubles were performed. For "Sunday Bloody Sunday", all four members of the band performed on the dividing walkway, with drummer Larry Mullen, Jr. playing only a single snare drum. The song was followed by "Raised by Wolves", which was written about the Dublin and Monaghan bombings of 1974; during performances, the video screen showed pictures of the 33 victims. For the final song of the first act, "Until the End of the World", the Edge performed inside the video screen, while Bono, through his video projection on the screen, attempted to interact with his bandmate. During the song's conclusion, the video screen displayed a light bulb smashing to release a tsunami that washed away the "innocence" of Cedarwood Road, while pages from Ulysses, Lord of the Flies, the Psalms, and Alice in Wonderland fell from the venue ceiling like confetti.

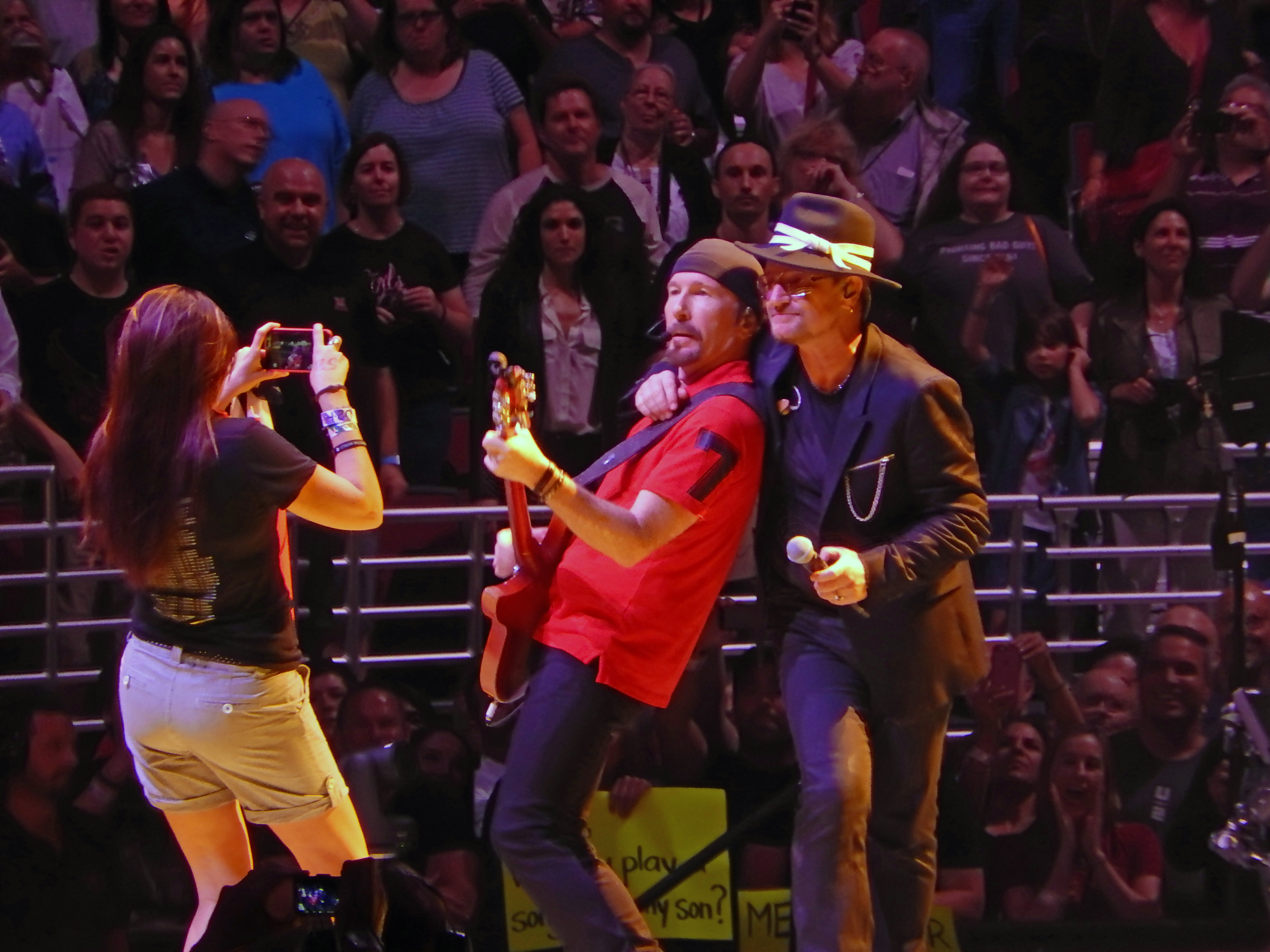
Portions of the shows were filmed by a fan with a mobile phone for streaming via Meerkat.

After the intermission, the second act began with a performance of "Invisible" as a recreation of the Berlin Wall on the video screen dissolved to reveal U2 inside. The group remained inside the screen to perform half of "Even Better Than the Real Thing" before emerging to finish the song on-stage. For the next sequence, beginning with "Mysterious Ways", the band performed on the B-stage and the show was filmed by a fan on-stage with a mobile phone for live streaming online through the mobile app Meerkat. These performances were also projected onto the set's video screens. The live streams were first used during U2's Phoenix and Los Angeles shows. Either "Elevation" or "Desire" were usually played next, although U2 sometimes rotated songs in their place at different concerts, such as "Ordinary Love" and "Volcano".

Following B.B. King's death in May 2015, the band played "Angel of Harlem" and "When Love Comes to Town" to honour the singer-songwriter with whom they worked for Rattle and Hum. An acoustic version of "Every Breaking Wave" was played from the e-stage, with just the Edge on piano and Bono's vocals. During the European leg, Bono and the Edge played "October" after "Every Breaking Wave". For "Bullet the Blue Sky", the singer thematically re-interpreted the song, modifying the mid-song spoken passage to be a criticism of the modern-day Bono and his excesses by his younger self. Towards the end of the song during North American performances, he said, "Hands up, I'm an American" and "I can't breathe, I'm an American", addressing the civil unrest in US communities caused by police violence against African-Americans. During the European leg, Bono replaced this segment with pleas for resolution to the Syrian refugee crisis, along with a snippet of "Zooropa" re-contextualised by the crisis segueing into "Where the Streets Have No Name". Performances of "Pride (In the Name of Love)" were preluded by an extended snippet of "The Hands That Built America". "With or Without You" was played late in the second act, with the group often shuffling its position in the setlist.

During the encore in North America, U2 played "City of Blinding Lights", "Beautiful Day", and occasionally "Bad". From show to show, U2 alternated between "I Still Haven't Found What I'm Looking For", "One", and more rarely, "40", as the closing song. The opening show marked U2's first tour concert at which they did not play "One" since its live debut in 1992 on the Zoo TV Tour.

=== Guest appearances ===
Several guests joined U2 on-stage during their shows in New York City. On 22 July 2015, The Tonight Show host Jimmy Fallon performed "Desire" with the group; Fallon previously performed the song on his show with his house band, the Roots, in an imitation of Bono after U2 canceled a week-long residency on the show in November 2014 due to Bono's injury. After Fallon's Innocence + Experience performance with U2, the Roots accompanied them for "Angel of Harlem", much as they did when U2 played the song on The Tonight Show in May 2015. On 26 July 2015, Lady Gaga joined the band to play piano and sing for "Ordinary Love". During an off-day on 29 July, the Edge and Clayton made a surprise appearance at the 20th anniversary party for the band's fansite @u2, and they joined a U2 tribute act in performing "Where the Streets Have No Name" and "Out of Control". On 30 July, Paul Simon joined U2 to play his song "Mother and Child Reunion", which they had been snippeting regularly on tour. On 31 July, the final date of the North American leg of the tour, Bruce Springsteen accompanied the band for performances of "I Still Haven't Found What I'm Looking For" and "Stand By Me".

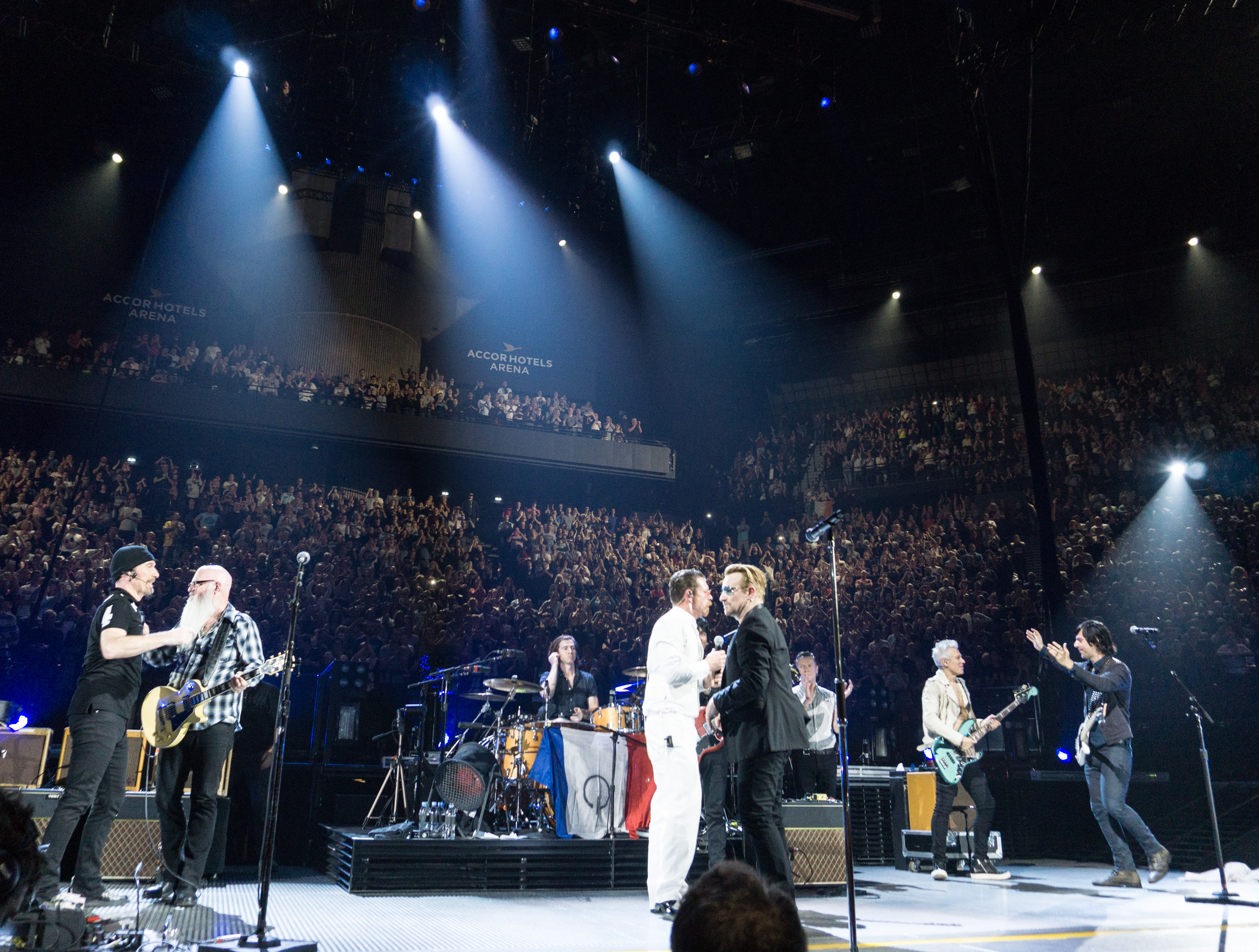
On 7 December 2015, the final show of the tour, U2 are joined on-stage in Paris by Eagles of Death Metal.

For U2's 5 September show in Turin, Zucchero guest starred for a performance of "I Still Haven't Found What I'm Looking For". Noel Gallagher did the same for the band's 26 October show in London, while also helping them cover the Beatles' "All You Need Is Love". Patti Smith joined U2 on two occasions to cover her song "People Have the Power"—in London on 29 October 2015, and in Paris on 6 December 2015 for the first of the band's rescheduled dates in the city. For the tour's closing show on 7 December in Paris, U2 were joined on-stage by Eagles of Death Metal, who were returning to the city for the first time since their show at the Bataclan on 13 November 2015, where the deadliest of that day's attacks in Paris occurred, killing 89 people. The two bands performed a cover of "People Have the Power" before Eagles of Death Metal concluded the show with their song "I Love You All the Time".

The band had been inviting fans on-stage to perform with them throughout their career, and they made this a regular occurrence on the Innocence + Experience Tour. Guest fan performers included a U2 tribute act and an Elvis impersonator. Prior to the tour, Bono said, "What was at the heart of punk rock for us was the desire to communicate on an equal basis with your audience, meaning there's no division between you and the people that come to see you."

== Concert broadcast ==
In November 2015, two films about the tour were scheduled to air on American television network HBO, but both were postponed. The first was a concert film entitled Innocence + Experience: Live in Paris, which was originally scheduled to air on 14 November to showcase U2's performance at AccorHotels Arena in Paris from earlier that day. However, the terrorist attacks in Paris the day prior forced the concert and the broadcast to be postponed until 7 December. The concert was released on DVD, Blu-ray, and via digital download on 10 June 2016. The second film, a behind-the-scenes tour documentary featuring interviews with the band and tour personnel, was originally scheduled to air on 7 November, a week prior to the original concert broadcast date, but it did not air as planned. The documentary was slated to be directed by Davis Guggenheim, who previously worked with the Edge for the documentary It Might Get Loud (2008) and with U2 for From the Sky Down (2011).

== Reception ==
=== Critical response ===
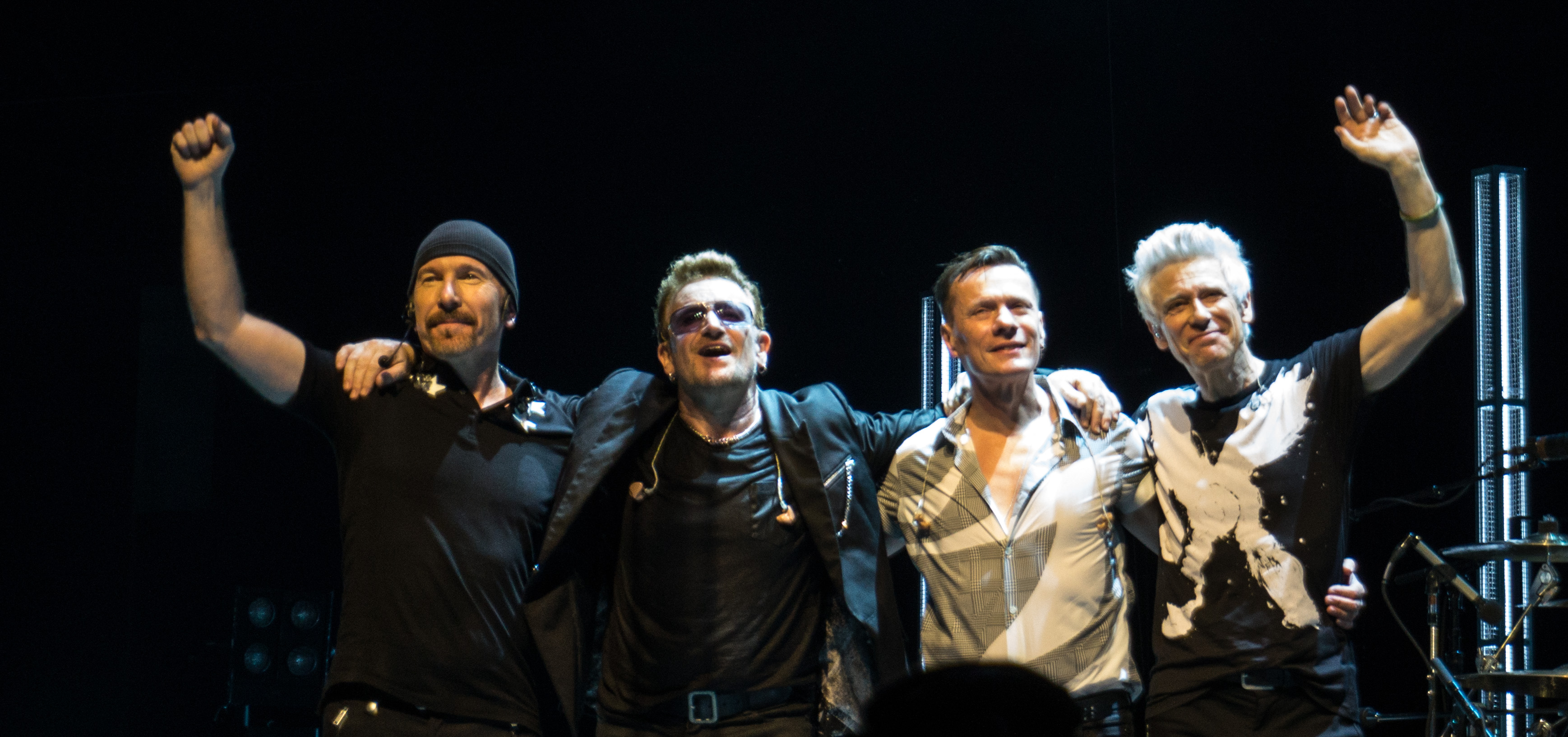
U2 takes a curtain call during a performance in Glasgow on 7 November 2015

The Innocence + Experience Tour was well received by critics. Philip Cosores of Consequence of Sound, reviewing a Los Angeles show, said, "U2 was every bit the brash, boisterous, larger-than-life rock stars fans would expect, or even hope for". He complimented the show for feeling intimate and said that performances of the new songs "argued that perhaps the most recent U2 output was given an unfair shake from critics more interested in attacking the new album's release method than the actual songs". Greg Kot of the Chicago Tribune praised the show, writing, "Visuals, sound and sequencing synced up to tell a story, but it was a story built on emotionally involving songs presented with a minimum of fuss." Kot, who was critical of Songs of Innocence, thought the album's songs were redeemed by their live performances, saying, "it's tempting to ask for a do-over of [U2's] latest album... after witnessing this show. Despite the album's flat, slick surfaces, the Irish quartet made its latest material the centerpiece of its current tour." Jim DeRogatis of WBEZ wrote, "U2 has got its mojo back." Despite doubts about U2 after their previous tour and the release of Songs of Innocence, the band's opening four songs of a Chicago show "convinced [him] that U2 is as ferocious, focused, and no-nonsense committed as it's ever been". DeRogatis believed that "the new songs were much harder-hitting and far more emotional than in the bland, over-produced versions on record".

Ben Ratliff of The New York Times called the production grandiose but considered the concert an "achievement, integrated and sure-footed". Compared to the album versions of the band's new songs, Ratliff said their live performances had "surprising authority" and "stronger blood". Ratliff concluded his review: "U2's hunger to combine and include has only grown greater; the triumph of the concert was finding an ordered, comprehensive rationale for it." Rob Hastings of The Independent called a London concert "one of the most unforgettable arena shows most people will have seen". Despite reservations about U2's new songs, Hastings praised the group for using the visuals to make the songs' personal nature connect with the audience. He said, "The songs blossom as their meanings emerge through the pixels as much as the lyrics." In another review of a London concert, Kitty Empire of The Observer said that the video screens offered "mixed-media renderings of U2's songs which veer from the mawkish to the mesmerising", but she thought the band "give great, thoughtful son et lumière". Dorian Lynskey of Q said, "Just as Zoo TV and 360° reinvented stadium rock, this tour offered a glimpse into the future of arena shows."

At the 2016 Pollstar Awards, U2 won for the Most Creative Stage Production. The band received nominations for Best Tour at the 2016 iHeartRadio Music Awards, and for Top Touring Artist at the 2016 Billboard Music Awards.

=== Commercial performance ===
According to Billboard, the North American leg's 36 shows grossed $76,166,563 from 650,582 tickets sold; all shows were sold-out. The two shows in Toronto alone grossed $4.4 million from 38,364 tickets sold, while the eight shows in New York grossed $19,474,285 from 149,942 tickets sold. In total, the tour grossed $152.2 million from 1,286,416 tickets sold, making U2 the fourth-highest-grossing artist of 2015.

== Set list ==
This setlist was performed at the 5 September 2015 concert held at Pala Alpitour in Turin. It does not represent all shows throughout the tour.

First act

1. "The Miracle (of Joey Ramone)"
2. "The Electric Co."
3. "Vertigo"
4. "I Will Follow"
5. "Iris (Hold Me Close)"
6. "Cedarwood Road"
7. "Song for Someone"
8. "Sunday Bloody Sunday"
9. "Raised by Wolves"
10. "Until the End of the World"

Second act

11. "The Fly" (Intermission)
12. "Invisible"
13. "Even Better Than the Real Thing"
14. "Mysterious Ways"
15. "Elevation"
16. "Ordinary Love"
17. "Every Breaking Wave"
18. "October"
19. "Bullet the Blue Sky"
20. "Zooropa"
21. "Where the Streets Have No Name"
22. "Pride (In the Name of Love)"
23. "With or Without You"

Encore

24. "City of Blinding Lights"
25. "Beautiful Day"
26. "One"

== Tour dates ==
List of concerts, showing date, city, country, venue, tickets sold, number of available tickets and amount of gross revenue
Date	City	Country	Venue	Attendance	Revenue
Leg 1: North America
14 May 2015	Vancouver	Canada	Rogers Arena	36,442 / 36,442	$3,810,775
15 May 2015	Vancouver	Canada	Rogers Arena	36,442 / 36,442	$3,810,775
18 May 2015	San Jose	United States	SAP Center	35,398 / 35,398	$4,385,885
19 May 2015	San Jose	United States	SAP Center	35,398 / 35,398	$4,385,885
22 May 2015	Phoenix	United States	US Airways Center	34,626 / 34,626	$3,992,985
23 May 2015	Phoenix	United States	US Airways Center	34,626 / 34,626	$3,992,985
26 May 2015	Inglewood	United States	The Forum	83,505 / 83,505	$9,886,540
27 May 2015	Inglewood	United States	The Forum	83,505 / 83,505	$9,886,540
30 May 2015	Inglewood	United States	The Forum	83,505 / 83,505	$9,886,540
31 May 2015	Inglewood	United States	The Forum	83,505 / 83,505	$9,886,540
3 June 2015	Inglewood	United States	The Forum	83,505 / 83,505	$9,886,540
6 June 2015	Denver	United States	Pepsi Center	28,141 / 28,141	$3,114,935
7 June 2015	Denver	United States	Pepsi Center	28,141 / 28,141	$3,114,935
12 June 2015	Montreal	Canada	Bell Centre	80,911 / 80,911	$7,236,524
13 June 2015	Montreal	Canada	Bell Centre	80,911 / 80,911	$7,236,524
16 June 2015	Montreal	Canada	Bell Centre	80,911 / 80,911	$7,236,524
17 June 2015	Montreal	Canada	Bell Centre	80,911 / 80,911	$7,236,524
24 June 2015	Chicago	United States	United Center	95,070 / 95,070	$11,347,305
25 June 2015	Chicago	United States	United Center	95,070 / 95,070	$11,347,305
28 June 2015	Chicago	United States	United Center	95,070 / 95,070	$11,347,305
29 June 2015	Chicago	United States	United Center	95,070 / 95,070	$11,347,305
2 July 2015	Chicago	United States	United Center	95,070 / 95,070	$11,347,305
6 July 2015	Toronto	Canada	Air Canada Centre	38,364 / 38,364	$4,447,473
7 July 2015	Toronto	Canada	Air Canada Centre	38,364 / 38,364	$4,447,473
10 July 2015	Boston	United States	TD Garden	68,183 / 68,183	$8,469,855
11 July 2015	Boston	United States	TD Garden	68,183 / 68,183	$8,469,855
14 July 2015	Boston	United States	TD Garden	68,183 / 68,183	$8,469,855
15 July 2015	Boston	United States	TD Garden	68,183 / 68,183	$8,469,855
18 July 2015	New York City	United States	Madison Square Garden	149,942 / 149,942	$19,474,285
19 July 2015	New York City	United States	Madison Square Garden	149,942 / 149,942	$19,474,285
22 July 2015	New York City	United States	Madison Square Garden	149,942 / 149,942	$19,474,285
23 July 2015	New York City	United States	Madison Square Garden	149,942 / 149,942	$19,474,285
26 July 2015	New York City	United States	Madison Square Garden	149,942 / 149,942	$19,474,285
27 July 2015	New York City	United States	Madison Square Garden	149,942 / 149,942	$19,474,285
30 July 2015	New York City	United States	Madison Square Garden	149,942 / 149,942	$19,474,285
31 July 2015	New York City	United States	Madison Square Garden	149,942 / 149,942	$19,474,285
Leg 2: Europe
4 September 2015	Turin	Italy	Pala Alpitour	29,555 / 29,555	$3,324,727
5 September 2015	Turin	Italy	Pala Alpitour	29,555 / 29,555	$3,324,727
8 September 2015	Amsterdam	Netherlands	Ziggo Dome	68,463 / 68,463	$7,674,824
9 September 2015	Amsterdam	Netherlands	Ziggo Dome	68,463 / 68,463	$7,674,824
12 September 2015	Amsterdam	Netherlands	Ziggo Dome	68,463 / 68,463	$7,674,824
13 September 2015	Amsterdam	Netherlands	Ziggo Dome	68,463 / 68,463	$7,674,824
16 September 2015	Stockholm	Sweden	Ericsson Globe	62,716 / 62,716	$6,850,151
17 September 2015	Stockholm	Sweden	Ericsson Globe	62,716 / 62,716	$6,850,151
21 September 2015	Stockholm	Sweden	Ericsson Globe	62,716 / 62,716	$6,850,151
22 September 2015 (Note: The concert in Stockholm on 22 September 2015 was originally scheduled for 20 September, but it was postponed due to safety concerns.)	Stockholm	Sweden	Ericsson Globe	62,716 / 62,716	$6,850,151
24 September 2015	Berlin	Germany	Mercedes-Benz Arena	57,798 / 57,798	$6,385,317
25 September 2015	Berlin	Germany	Mercedes-Benz Arena	57,798 / 57,798	$6,385,317
28 September 2015	Berlin	Germany	Mercedes-Benz Arena	57,798 / 57,798	$6,385,317
29 September 2015	Berlin	Germany	Mercedes-Benz Arena	57,798 / 57,798	$6,385,317
5 October 2015	Barcelona	Spain	Palau Sant Jordi	71,295 / 71,295	$8,482,056
6 October 2015	Barcelona	Spain	Palau Sant Jordi	71,295 / 71,295	$8,482,056
9 October 2015	Barcelona	Spain	Palau Sant Jordi	71,295 / 71,295	$8,482,056
10 October 2015	Barcelona	Spain	Palau Sant Jordi	71,295 / 71,295	$8,482,056
13 October 2015	Antwerp	Belgium	Sportpaleis	45,059 / 45,059	$4,760,263
14 October 2015	Antwerp	Belgium	Sportpaleis	45,059 / 45,059	$4,760,263
17 October 2015	Cologne	Germany	Lanxess Arena	35,243 / 35,243	$4,166,553
18 October 2015	Cologne	Germany	Lanxess Arena	35,243 / 35,243	$4,166,553
25 October 2015	London	England	The O_{2} Arena	104,913 / 104,913	$15,804,021
26 October 2015	London	England	The O_{2} Arena	104,913 / 104,913	$15,804,021
29 October 2015	London	England	The O_{2} Arena	104,913 / 104,913	$15,804,021
30 October 2015	London	England	The O_{2} Arena	104,913 / 104,913	$15,804,021
2 November 2015	London	England	The O_{2} Arena	104,913 / 104,913	$15,804,021
3 November 2015	London	England	The O_{2} Arena	104,913 / 104,913	$15,804,021
6 November 2015	Glasgow	Scotland	The SSE Hydro	25,222 / 25,222	$3,167,828
7 November 2015	Glasgow	Scotland	The SSE Hydro	25,222 / 25,222	$3,167,828
10 November 2015	Paris	France	AccorHotels Arena	69,864 / 69,864 (Note: The score data for the shows held at the AccorHotels Arena in Paris on 10–11 November and 6–7 December is available only as a four-show total, not from separate two-show visits.)	$7,760,999
11 November 2015	Paris	France	AccorHotels Arena	69,864 / 69,864	$7,760,999
18 November 2015	Belfast	Northern Ireland	SSE Arena Belfast	18,922 / 18,922	$2,576,203
19 November 2015	Belfast	Northern Ireland	SSE Arena Belfast	18,922 / 18,922	$2,576,203
23 November 2015	Dublin	Ireland	3Arena	46,784 / 46,784	$5,108,722
24 November 2015	Dublin	Ireland	3Arena	46,784 / 46,784	$5,108,722
27 November 2015	Dublin	Ireland	3Arena	46,784 / 46,784	$5,108,722
28 November 2015	Dublin	Ireland	3Arena	46,784 / 46,784	$5,108,722
6 December 2015 (Note: The concerts in Paris on 6 and 7 December 2015 were originally scheduled to take place on 14 and 15 November, respectively, but were rescheduled due to safety concerts.)	Paris	France	AccorHotels Arena	—	—
7 December 2015	Paris	France	AccorHotels Arena	—	—
Total				1,286,416 / 1,286,416	$152,228,227
