= Mysterious Ways (song) =

1991 single by U2

Single by U2

from the album Achtung Baby
- Released: 2 December 1991
- Recorded: 1990–1991
- Studio: STS, Windmill Lane (Dublin, Ireland); Hansa Ton (Berlin, Germany); Elsinore (Dalkey, Ireland)
- Genre: Alternative rock; funk rock; Madchester
- Length: 4:04 (album version); 4:08 (Best Of version)
- Label: Island
- Composer: U2
- Lyricist: Bono
- Producer: Daniel Lanois with Brian Eno

U2 singles chronology
"The Fly" (1991)	"Mysterious Ways" (1991)	"One" (1992)

Music video
- "Mysterious Ways" on YouTube

Audio sample
- "Mysterious Ways": file; help

"Mysterious Ways" is a song by Irish rock band U2. It is the eighth track from their seventh album, Achtung Baby (1991), and was released as the album's second single on 2 December 1991 by Island Records, two weeks after the album. The song began as an improvisation called "Sick Puppy", with the band liking only the bass part that bassist Adam Clayton composed. The band struggled to build a song from it, with vocalist Bono and producer Daniel Lanois arguing intensely during one songwriting session. The song's breakthrough came after guitarist the Edge began experimenting with the Korg A3 effects unit. "Mysterious Ways" features a danceable beat, funky guitar hook, and conga-laden percussion, as well as mystical lyrics by Bono about romance and women.

"Mysterious Ways" reached the top ten on the singles charts of several countries, including Canada and the band's native Ireland, where it went to number one. In the United States, the song topped the Billboard Modern Rock Tracks and Album Rock Tracks charts and peaked at number nine on the Billboard Hot 100. It received praise from critics after the release of Achtung Baby, many of whom called it one of the album's standout tracks and one that best illustrated the band's musical evolution on the album.

A music video for the song was filmed in Morocco and incorporated distorted images of Bono and a belly dancer, Morleigh Steinberg, who eventually married the Edge. "Mysterious Ways" made its live debut on the Zoo TV Tour in 1992, when performances were accompanied by an on-stage belly dancer. The group has continued to perform the song on subsequent tours.

== Writing and recording ==
"Mysterious Ways" began as an improvised demo called "Sick Puppy" that the group recorded at STS Studios in Dublin, as vocalist Bono, guitarist the Edge, and bassist Adam Clayton jammed over a drum machine. The band liked Clayton's bassline, which originated during their recording of a cover version of "Night and Day" and for a while, consisted of little more than a "one-note groove". However, the band had difficulties completing the remainder of the song melodically. Bono said that it was "a bass line in search of a song", while the Edge stated that "the key to the song was finding ways to mess around with chords on top without having to change the bass".

As U2 continued to struggle with the song, the tense atmosphere of the recording sessions at Hansa Studios in Berlin took its toll. Producer Daniel Lanois arrived at the studios early one morning before the band to work on ideas he had for the song. When Bono arrived, he began singing and contributing vocal ideas, but this conflicted with what Lanois had in mind for the track. Bono and a frustrated Lanois proceeded to argue intensely for over two hours, worrying sound engineer Joe O'Herlihy that a physical altercation would ensue. Bono looks back on the episode with a sense of humour: "That's why I love Danny so much. He cares about the record he's making as much and more than any band or artist he's working with."

The song "One", which proved to be breakthrough in the difficult recording sessions for Achtung Baby, began after a moment of inspiration as the band worked on "Mysterious Ways". The Edge caught Lanois' attention while toying around with various chord progressions for the bridge of "Mysterious Ways". Encouraged by Lanois, the Edge combined two of the chord progressions, inspiring the rest of the group to join him and improvise the new song "One".

The band made progress on "Mysterious Ways" after the Edge began experimenting with the "Funk Wah" setting on a Korg A3 guitar effects unit and Bono told him to use it for the song. Bono said it made an "envelope of sound which would turn a guitar chord into the funkiest of jackhammers". Drummer Larry Mullen Jr. recorded a drum track near the end of the sessions, introducing a "much groovier beat" that "demonstrated the difference between a drum machine and a real drummer". Bono calls the song "U2 at our funkiest ... Sly and the Family Stone meets Madchester baggy". Lanois provided additional percussion by playing the congas. "Mysterious Ways" and the track it inspired, "One", were the only two songs that were primarily completed at Hansa Studios before the album sessions moved to Dublin in 1991. Much like they did for other songs from Achtung Baby, U2 continued to work on "Mysterious Ways" up to the recording deadline, adding a guitar overdub after the mix was already finished.

Several different verses were written, but the Edge advocated those with a "nursery rhyme feel", such as "Johnny, take a walk with your sister in the moon / Let her pale light in to fill up the room". He also composed the chorus' reassuring line, "It's all right / It's all right / It's all right", wanting to prove a point since no prior U2 song contained the line.

== Composition ==
"Mysterious Ways" is played in a 4/4 time signature at a tempo of 99 beats per minute. The introduction to the song, which features the song's well-known guitar hook, consists of "one seventh-fret barre chord, a couple of rhythmic scratches and two notes" played in a key of B♭. The verses follow a chord progression of B♭–E♭–B♭–F.

The song's lyrics are addressed to a man living without romance, which was in line with a proposed title for the album, Fear of Women. The lyrics describe how women often entrance and dominate men; Bono said, "At times, I do tend to idealize women", explaining that his wife Ali sometimes complains that he puts her on a pedestal. Some have found religious interpretations for the song. Scholar Atara Stein, in an essay analysing U2 songs, describes "Mysterious Ways" as one of several Achtung Baby tracks that idealizes women and creates a false illusion of them. Stein found religious meaning in the line "She moves in mysterious ways" and Bono's request to the woman to "Lift my days, light up my nights". According to her, "Paradoxically, this process of idealization simultaneously elevates the woman as an idol to be worshipped while presenting her as a potentially dangerous force the singer must control."

== Release ==
"Mysterious Ways" was released as the album's second single on 25 November 1991. In the U.S., the song reached number nine on the Billboard Hot 100, making it one of the band's highest-charting singles in the U.S.; only three other U2 singles ("With or Without You", "I Still Haven't Found What I'm Looking For", and "Desire") have reached higher positions. "Mysterious Ways" also topped both the Modern Rock Tracks and Album Rock Tracks Billboard charts. It peaked at number eight on the Dutch Top 40. "Mysterious Ways," however, is one of few U2 songs to miss the top ten in the UK Singles Chart, where it only reached number 13.

When the single covers to "Even Better Than the Real Thing", "The Fly", "Who's Gonna Ride Your Wild Horses", and "Mysterious Ways" are arranged, a picture of the band members driving a Trabant is formed.

== Music video ==
The music video for "Mysterious Ways" has a belly dancing theme, which includes distorted shots of Bono dancing, and other mystical images. It was filmed by French director, photographer, film producer and actor Stéphane Sednaoui in Fez, Morocco. The belly dancer is portrayed by Morleigh Steinberg.

== Reception ==
Upon the release of Achtung Baby, "Mysterious Ways" received positive reviews from critics. Rolling Stone called it a standout track among the new dance-influenced songs, praising its "ebullient hook and a guitar solo in which the Edge segues from one of his signature bursts of light into an insidious funk riff". Steve Morse of The Boston Globe called it an "exceptional love song ... with a rapturous chorus" and noted that even though Bono's vocals on the album differ significantly from his previous style, "Mysterious Ways" features him returning to his "yearning self". The New York Times praised the song as the album's best track, commenting that it is "full of rhythmic cross-currents and fuzz-toned murk" and citing it as an example that the band had "taken Bo Diddley and James Brown lessons for its new syncopated dance songs". The Austin Chronicle singled out the song's "conga-laced funk" as one of three moments on the record where U2 have never sounded better.

Denise Sullivan of AllMusic praised "Mysterious Ways", saying it is "structured like a gospel chant" and "maintains its deep groove with the assistance of some chunky guitar riffing, a persistent percussive beat, and what sound like spontaneous vocal bursts by Bono in the R&B tradition". In a review of the album's 20th anniversary reissue, Kit O'Toole of the Seattle Post-Intelligencer said "Mysterious Ways" exemplified the evolution of the band's sound. In her opinion, despite the song's sonic flourishes, "this departure does not jar longtime fans, as it retains the core of U2—loud, swooping rock guitar, a huge voice, and powerful drums. Quite simply, it's a textbook example of how artists can alter their sound without compromising their essential beliefs." The song flourished and finished tied for 25th place on the "Best Singles" list from The Village Voice's 1991 Pazz & Jop critics' poll.

== Live performances ==
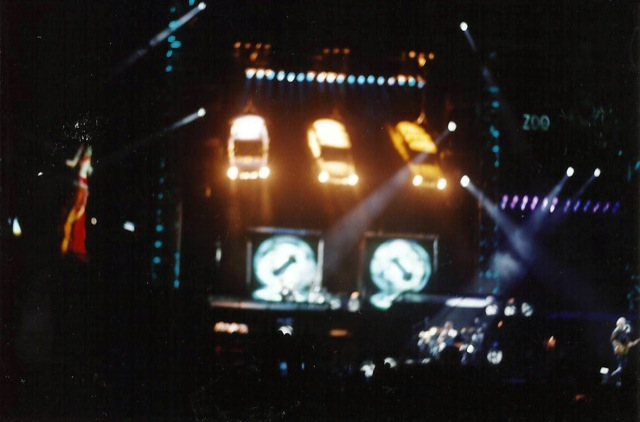
A performance of "Mysterious Ways" from the 1993 Zoo TV Tour

"Mysterious Ways" made its live debut on 29 February 1992 in Lakeland, Florida on the opening night of the Zoo TV Tour, and it was subsequently played at every show on the tour. Zoo TV performances of the song featured a belly dancer on-stage, who would tempt Bono and the Edge. The 1992 indoor legs featured Florida resident Christina Petro as the dancer. Tour choreographer Morleigh Steinberg assumed the role starting with the Outside Broadcast leg; Steinberg began dating the Edge during the tour, and the two married in 2002. During performances, the Zoo TV video screens displayed revolving images of Marilyn Monroe's head with tape over it. Performances from this tour were extended beyond the length of the original studio version of the song, with a slide guitar solo after the point in the song where the studio version ends, and a longer introduction that included a piano interlude by the Edge. Both the added intro and outro featured additional lyrics by Bono, much of which were sung in falsetto.

The group continued playing "Mysterious Ways" on their following concert tour, 1997's PopMart Tour, performing it at each of the tour's 93 shows. On 2001's Elevation Tour, the song was excluded from some shows but was still performed at the majority of concerts. In the 2003 concert film U2 Go Home: Live from Slane Castle, Ireland, in a bonus track performance of "Mysterious Ways", Bono calls out his daughter's name, Eve, several times while performing this song. She then joins him on stage and dances with him while he sings during the last half of the song, and during Edge's slide guitar solo outro.

Over the next two tours, the Vertigo and U2 360° Tours, performances of the song became less common. The band also stopped playing an extended slide guitar solo at the end of the song during the U2 360° Tour, with the song finishing with an extended version of the album outro. The extended introduction to the song was removed for the Vertigo and 360° Tours. However, as the 360° Tour continued, "Mysterious Ways" once again became a set list staple. Live performances of the song often involve a female member of the audience joining Bono on stage to dance.

The song was played at every show of the Innocence + Experience Tour as one of the songs on the e-stage. Much like previous tours, a member of the audience was usually bought onstage to dance with the band.

The song was played occasionally on The Joshua Tree Tour 2017, which saw the return of the slide solo that had been absent since the Vertigo Tour. The song was not performed at all during the Experience + Innocence Tour nor The Joshua Tree Tour's 2019 leg, marking the first tours it was not performed at any capacity. U2 performed "Mysterious Ways" again during their 2023–2024 U2:UV Achtung Baby residency at the Sphere in the Las Vegas Valley. During these performances, the venue's LED screen displayed moving bars of light that David Barbour of Lighting & Sound International said "creat[ed] a kind of Zoetrope effect".

The Edge has always used a Rickenbacker 330/12 to play this song live. On the Zoo TV, PopMart, Elevation and Innocence + Experience Tours he has used a Fireglo coloured model, while on the Vertigo and U2 360° Tours, he has used a Mapleglo coloured one.

== Formats and track listings ==
Two-track single
No.	Title	Additional production and remix	Length
1.	"Mysterious Ways"	—	4:04
2.	"Mysterious Ways" (Solar Plexus Magic Hour remix)	Howard Gray, Trevor Gray, Steve Lillywhite, Apollo 440	8:14

Maxi single
No.	Title	Additional production and remix	Length
1.	"Mysterious Ways"	—	4:04
2.	"Mysterious Ways" (Solar Plexus extended club mix)	Howard Gray, Trevor Gray, Steve Lillywhite, Apollo 440	7:00
3.	"Mysterious Ways" (Apollo 440 Magic Hour remix)	Apollo 440	4:25
4.	"Mysterious Ways" (Tabla Motown remix)	Apollo 440	4:27
5.	"Mysterious Ways" (Solar Plexus club mix)	Howard Gray, Trevor Gray, Steve Lillywhite, Apollo 440	4:09

Bonus single (Australia)
No.	Title	Additional production and remix	Length
1.	"Mysterious Ways" (Perfecto mix)	Paul Oakenfold, Steve Osborne	7:06
2.	"Mysterious Ways" (Ultimatum mix)	The Stereo MCs a.k.a. Ultimatum	5:00

== Credits and personnel ==
U2

- Bono – lead vocals
- The Edge – guitar, keyboards, backing vocals
- Adam Clayton – bass guitar
- Larry Mullen Jr. – drums, percussion

Additional performers

- Daniel Lanois – additional percussion

Technical

- Production – Daniel Lanois with Brian Eno
- Engineering – Flood
- Additional engineering – Robbie Adams
- Assistant engineering – Shannon Strong
- Mixing – Flood, Edge, and Daniel Lanois
- Mixing assistance – Shannon Strong
- "Solar Plexus club mix" and "Solar Plexus club mix" remixed by Howard Gray, Steve Lillywhite and Trevor Gray

== Charts ==
=== Weekly charts ===
Weekly chart performance for "Mysterious Ways"
Chart (1991–1992)	Peak position
Australia (ARIA)	3
Belgium (Ultratop 50 Flanders)	12
Canada Retail Singles (The Record)	4
Canada Top Singles (RPM)	1
Europe (Eurochart Hot 100)	14
Europe (European Hit Radio)	5
Finland (Suomen virallinen lista)	8
France (SNEP)	19
Germany (GfK)	46
Greece (IFPI)	3
Ireland (IRMA)	1
Italy (Musica e dischi)	1
Luxembourg (Radio Luxembourg)	5
Netherlands (Dutch Top 40)	8
Netherlands (Single Top 100)	13
New Zealand (Recorded Music NZ)	3
Portugal (AFP)	1
Spain (AFYVE)	7
Sweden (Sverigetopplistan)	17
Switzerland (Schweizer Hitparade)	13
UK Singles (Official Charts)	13
UK Airplay (Music Week)	5
UK Dance (Music Week)	33
UK Club Chart (Music Week)	97
US Billboard Hot 100	9
US Alternative Airplay (Billboard)	1
US Dance Club Songs (Billboard)	42
US Dance Singles Sales (Billboard)	29
US Mainstream Rock Airplay (Billboard)	1
US Cash Box Top 100	3

=== Year-end charts ===
Year-end chart performance for "Mysterious Ways"
Chart (1991)	Position
Italy (Musica e dischi)	90

Chart (1992)	Position
Canada Top Singles (RPM)	14
Europe (Eurochart Hot 100)	94
US Billboard Hot 100	57
US Album Rock Tracks (Billboard)	1
US Modern Rock Tracks (Billboard)	7
US Cash Box Top 100	47

== Certifications ==
Certifications for "Mysterious Ways"
Region	Certification	Certified units/sales
New Zealand (RMNZ)	Gold	5,000^{*}
^{*} Sales figures based on certification alone.

== Release history ==
Release dates and formats for "Mysterious Ways"
Region	Date	Format(s)	Label(s)	Ref(s).
Australia	2 December 1991	7-inch vinyl; 12-inch vinyl; CD; cassette	Island	
United Kingdom	2 December 1991	7-inch vinyl; 12-inch vinyl; CD; cassette	Island	
Japan	21 December 1991	Mini-CD; maxi-CD	Island	

== Covers ==
Snow Patrol reworked the song for the 2011 tribute album AHK-toong BAY-bi Covered. "As much as it's a thrilling live-set stormer," remarked Gary Lightbody, "we've always seen the quiet storm of gospel in 'Mysterious Ways'."

See also:

- List of covers of U2 songs - Mysterious Ways

== See also ==
- List of number-one singles of 1991 (Ireland)
- List of number-one mainstream rock hits (United States)
- Number one modern rock hits of 1991
- List of RPM number-one singles of 1992
