= Innocence + Experience: Live in Paris =

2016 concert video by U2

Video by U2
- Released: 10 June 2016
- Recorded: 7 December 2015
- Venues: AccorHotels Arena (Paris, France)
- Genre: Rock
- Length: 151 minutes
- Labels: Island, Interscope
- Director: Hamish Hamilton

U2 chronology
Another Time, Another Place: Live at the Marquee London 1980 (2015)	Innocence + Experience: Live in Paris (2016)	Songs of Experience (2017)

Innocence + Experience: Live in Paris (stylised as iNNOCENCE + eXPERIENCE: Live in Paris) is a 2016 concert film by Irish rock band U2. It was shot on 7 December 2015 at AccorHotels Arena in Paris, France, on the final date of the band's Innocence + Experience Tour. The concert aired on American television network HBO the same day as the show, and was later released worldwide on home video on DVD, Blu-ray, and via digital download on 10 June 2016.

The video depicts U2's return to Paris less than a month after the 13 November 2015 attacks in the city. The band had played two of four scheduled shows in the city when the attacks occurred, forcing the postponement of the final two shows and the originally planned HBO broadcast until December. During the filmed concert, U2 paid tribute to the victims of the attacks and were joined on-stage by Eagles of Death Metal, whose concert at the Bataclan was the site of the deadliest of the attacks.

== Background ==
Innocence + Experience: Live in Paris was originally scheduled to air on American television network HBO on 14 November 2015 to showcase a performance by U2 on their Innocence + Experience Tour at AccorHotels Arena in Paris, France from earlier that day. However, the broadcast was rescheduled after the terrorist attacks in Paris the day prior forced the postponement of the band's final two Paris concerts, which were scheduled for 14 and 15 November. The shows were rescheduled to 6 and 7 December, making them the final dates of the European leg of the tour. According to tour producer Arthur Fogel, "minimal" refunds were requested (3,000 of the 34,000 tickets sold). The rescheduling posed logistical challenges for the band, as the tour was supposed to end in Dublin more than a week prior to the new Paris dates, and crew members and equipment had been set to disperse. Arena security was bolstered for the rescheduled shows. Writing about U2's plan to return to a Paris still on high alert, Don Kaplan of the New York Daily News said, "The Dublin band, born in the crucible of violence that gripped Ireland in the 1970s and '80s, has long collaborated with other musicians, artists, celebrities, and politicians to address issues concerning poverty, disease, and social injustice. That they've now opted to challenge terrorism and fear should surprise absolutely no one."

== Concert overview and production ==
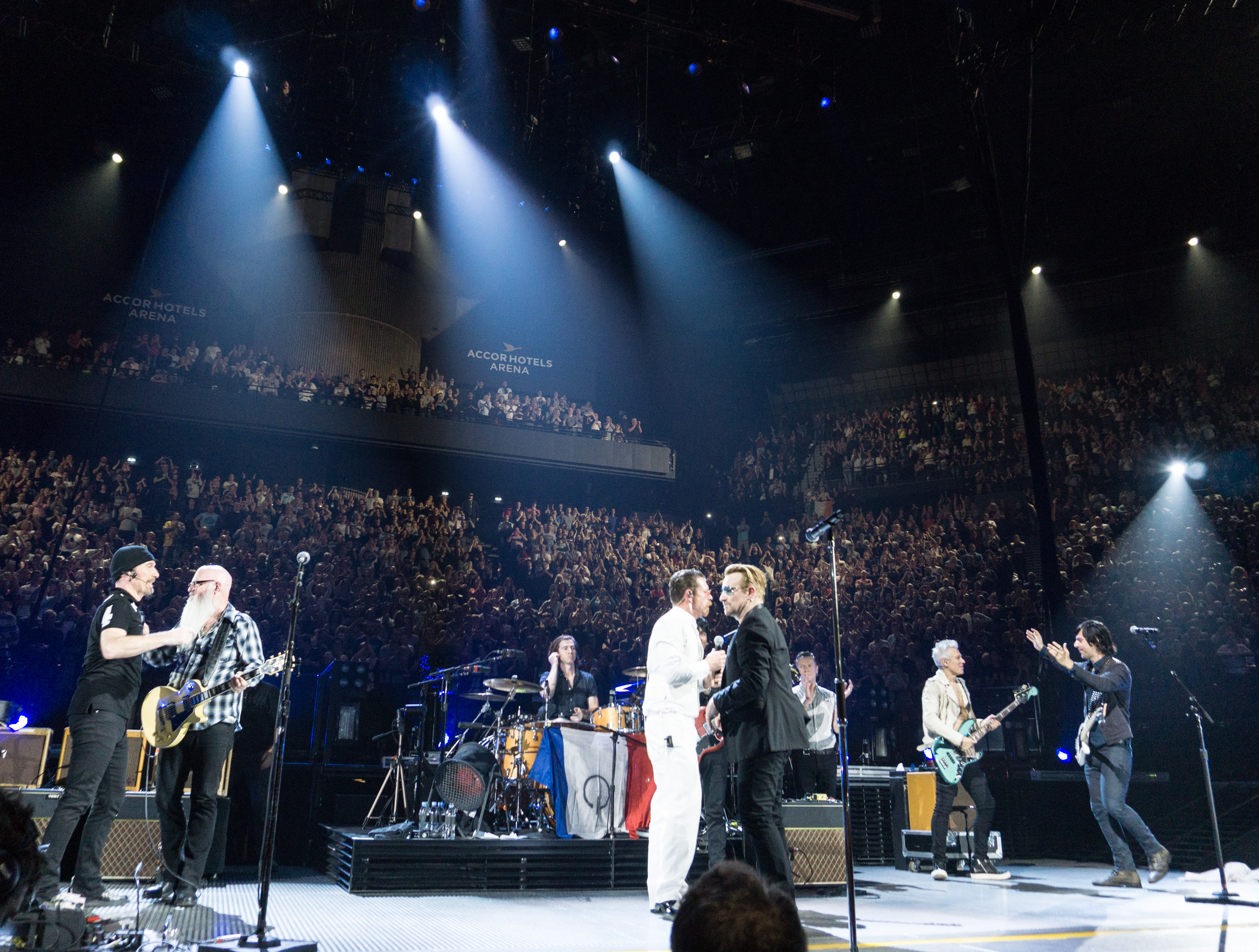
U2 are joined on-stage by Eagles of Death Metal, who were returning to Paris for the first time since the attack at their Bataclan show.

U2 paid tribute to the victims of the attacks by displaying their names on the video screen during their performance of "City of Blinding Lights". The display was created by Willie Williams and the tour's video team. Guitarist the Edge said the group tried to balance paying tribute "in an artful way that doesn't feel exploitive or jingoistic or anything trite". At the end of the show, the group were joined on-stage by Eagles of Death Metal, who were returning to the city for the first time since their show at the Bataclan where the deadliest of the attacks in Paris occurred, killing 89 people. Bono introduced the group by saying, "They were robbed of their stage, so we would like to offer them ours." The two bands performed a cover of Patti Smith's song "People Have the Power" before U2 left the stage and Eagles of Death Metal concluded the show with their song "I Love You All the Time". The Edge singled out the moment in which the members of U2 handed their instruments to Eagles of Death Metal as his favourite of the evening.

Audio aspects of the television broadcast were handled by Music Mix Mobile (M3). The company's co-founder John Harris served as co-mixer, alongside the band's own mixer Carl Glanville, who worked on the Songs of Innocence album and the tour pre-production. Leading up to the concert, Harris travelled on tour with U2 for two months and recorded 20 shows in six countries to familiarise himself with their setlist. For the Paris concert, he chose several digital audio processing solutions by Waves Audio, including Waves MultiRack, H-Reverb Hybrid Reverb, CLA-76 Compressor/Limiter, and L360 Surround Limiter. Harris said that the arena was "not acoustically perfect" and that his responsibility was "to create an acoustic space [for the broadcast] that compensates for that". Most of the reverb heard on the broadcast was achieved using the H-Reverb product. For the show, 126 audio inputs were recorded, including 12 bass channels and those covering three separate drum sets. Harris used a Waves workstation in an M3 Eclipse truck, duplicating the workstation that he used daily in the United States.

== Release ==
The concert was released on DVD, Blu-ray, and via digital download on 10 June 2016. Deluxe editions of physical copies include bonus video material. A super deluxe bundle includes: a USB light bulb; a 64-page hardcover book; stencil set; dog tags; badges; and a downloadable copy of the concert.

The packaging for the home release was designed by AMP Visual in conjunction with long-time band consultant Gavin Friday. The cover image depicts a lightbulb, which was used as a prop at the beginning of shows on the Innocence + Experience Tour to represent U2's early, innocent days. The light bulb on the cover was taken from a desk lamp, photographed, and given a "tough punk-like graphic" treatment. The packaging design is an homage to Andy Warhol's artwork for The Velvet Underground & Nico; additionally, the two-DVD edition of Innocence + Experience: Live in Paris features a peel-off sticker of the light bulb, similar to the banana sticker that peels off the cover of The Velvet Underground & Nico.

On 15 March 2021, U2 announced a concert broadcast series called "The Virtual Road" in partnership with YouTube, by which four of the group's past concert films were remastered and streamed on the band's official YouTube channel for 48 hours each. Innocence + Experience: Live in Paris began streaming on 10 April, with a pre-recorded performance by French rock band Feu! Chatterton serving as an "opening act". To coincide with the broadcast event, a four-track EP of songs from Innocence + Experience was released to streaming services and digital stores.

== Reception ==
=== Television ratings ===
The Monday night broadcast of the concert on HBO drew 140,000 viewers and a 0.06 rating in the 18–49 age demographic, according to Nielsen data.

=== Critical reaction ===
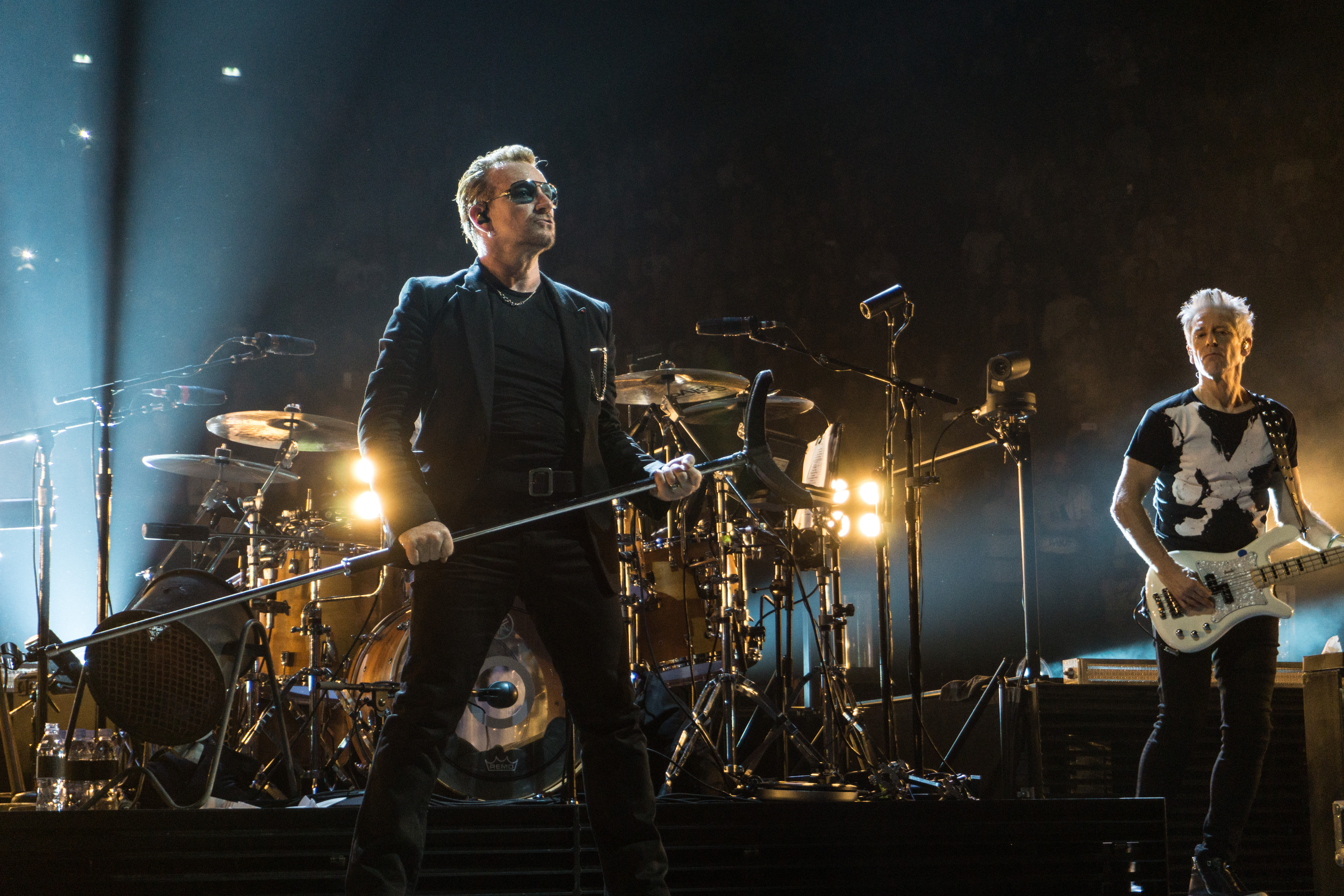
Bono and Adam Clayton, during filming of the concert

Jeff Miers of The Buffalo News gave the concert a favourable review, saying that the band mostly "rose to the occasion through the course of a two-hour show filled with songs and statements that seemed eerily prescient." Miers thought the Songs of Innocence tracks were weaker compared to the group's other songs, but overall praised the concert: "During its many majestic moments, the band's show suggested that the spirit that infuses the best rock music – one of defiant optimism, compassion and passion, a liberal and open-minded view of the world, and the stubborn belief that a few chords and a little truth can change the world, one consciousness at a time – was not snuffed out when terrorists stormed the Bataclan."

Reviewing the home video release, Mike Mettler of Sound & Vision said, "U2's live-stage mastery is on generous full display here, directed with a keen, all-encompassing eye by longtime band video associate Hamish Hamilton". He concluded, "the elegiac envelopment of the sounds and visuals of iNNOCENCE + eXPERIENCE is something to behold on Blu-ray on any given beautiful day, so don't let it slip away."

In January 2017, the Digital Entertainment Group honoured Innocence + Experience with an award for "Best Concert Video on Blu-Ray".

== Track listing ==
Track list per U2.com official website.

All lyrics are written by Bono; all music is composed by U2, except where noted.

No.	Title	Writer(s)	Length
1.	"People Have the Power" (public address introduction)	Patti Smith, Fred "Sonic" Smith
2.	"The Miracle (of Joey Ramone)"	U2 (music), Bono and The Edge (lyrics)
3.	"Vertigo"	U2 (music), Bono and The Edge (lyrics)
4.	"I Will Follow"
5.	"Iris (Hold Me Close)"	U2 (music), Bono and The Edge (lyrics)
6.	"Cedarwood Road"	U2 (music), Bono and The Edge (lyrics)
7.	"Song for Someone"	U2 (music), Bono and The Edge (lyrics)
8.	"Sunday Bloody Sunday"
9.	"Raised By Wolves"	U2 (music), Bono and The Edge (lyrics)
10.	"Until the End of the World"
11.	"The Fly (Gavin Friday remix)" (public address during intermission)
12.	"Invisible"
13.	"Even Better Than the Real Thing"
14.	"Mysterious Ways"
15.	"Elevation"
16.	"Every Breaking Wave"	U2 (music), Bono and The Edge (lyrics)
17.	"October"
18.	"Bullet the Blue Sky"
19.	"Zooropa"
20.	"Where the Streets Have No Name"
21.	"Pride (In the Name of Love)"
22.	"With or Without You"
23.	"Global Citizen" (prerecorded speech by Stephen Hawking)
24.	"City of Blinding Lights"
25.	"Beautiful Day"
26.	"Mother and Child Reunion"	Paul Simon
27.	"Bad"
28.	"One"
29.	"People Have the Power" (with Eagles of Death Metal)	Smith, Smith
30.	"I Love You All the Time" (solo performance by Eagles of Death Metal)	Jesse Hughes, Joshua Homme, Mark Ramos Nishita

Bonus Material
No.	Title	Writer(s)	Length
1.	"Cedarwood Road – A Gavin Friday Narration"
2.	"Out of Control" (Live in Paris – 6 December 2015)
3.	"The Future Better Hurry Up" (commercial for Innocence + Experience Tour)
4.	"The Electric Co." (Live in Paris – 11 November 2015)
5.	"i + e – Behind the Scenes with the Director"
6.	"Bad" / "People Have the Power" (With Patti Smith, Live in Paris – 6 December 2015)	U2 / Smith, Smith
7.	"The Wanderer" (Intermission video)
8.	"The Troubles" (featuring Lykke Li)
9.	"Music Videos": "Ordinary Love"; "Invisible"; "The Miracle (of Joey Ramone)"; "Every Breaking Wave" – A Film by Aoife Mcardle; "Song for Someone" (Directed by Vincent Haycock); "Song for Someone" (Behind the Scenes); "Song for Someone" (Directed by Matt Mahurin)"

== Personnel ==
- Bono – lead vocals
- The Edge – guitar, piano, vocals
- Adam Clayton – bass guitar
- Larry Mullen Jr. – drums, backing vocals, percussion

== Charts ==
=== Weekly charts ===
Chart (2016)	Peak position
Australian Music DVD (ARIA)	3
Austrian Music DVD (Ö3 Austria)	2
Belgian Music DVD (Ultratop Wallonia)	1
Belgian Music DVD (Ultratop Flanders)	1
Brazilian DVDs (ABPD)	4
Danish Music DVD (Hitlisten)	1
Dutch Music DVD (MegaCharts)	1
Finnish Music DVD (Suomen virallinen lista)	1
French Music DVD (SNEP)	1
German Albums (Offizielle Top 100)	3
Hungarian Albums (MAHASZ)	16
Irish Music DVD (IRMA)	1
Japanese Blu-ray Chart (Oricon)	27
Portuguese Music DVD (AFP)	1
Spanish Music DVD (Promusicae)	1
Swedish Music DVD (Sverigetopplistan)	1
Swiss Music DVD (Schweizer Hitparade)	1
UK Music Videos (Official Charts)	1
US Music Videos (Billboard)	1

=== Year-end charts ===
Chart (2016)	Position
Australian Music DVD (ARIA)	23
Belgian Music DVD (Ultratop Flanders)	5
Belgian Music DVD (Ultratop Wallonia)	3
Dutch Music DVD (MegaCharts)	3
Swedish Music DVD (Sverigetopplistan)	8
Spanish Music DVD (PROMUSICAE)	6
US Music Video Sales (Billboard)	11

Chart (2017)	Position
Belgian Music DVD (Ultratop Flanders)	23
Belgian Music DVD (Ultratop Wallonia)	21
Dutch Music DVD (MegaCharts)	9
Swedish Music DVD (Sverigetopplistan)	50

Chart (2018)	Position
Belgian Music DVD (Ultratop Flanders)	41
Dutch Music DVD (MegaCharts)	23
Swedish Music DVD (Sverigetopplistan)	69

Chart (2019)	Position
Australian Music DVD (ARIA)	46

== Certifications ==
Region	Certification	Certified units/sales
Portugal (AFP)	Gold	4,000^{^}
^{^} Shipments figures based on certification alone.
