= Songs of Innocence (U2 album) =

- Artwork for standard and deluxe editions of the commercial release

Studio album by U2
- Released: 9 September 2014
- Recorded: 2009–2014
- Studios: Electric Lady (New York City); Pull (New York City); The Church (London); Assault & Battery (London); Shangri-La (Malibu); The Woodshed (Los Angeles); Strathmore House (Killiney)
- Genre: Rock
- Length: 48:11
- Labels: Island, Interscope
- Producers: Danger Mouse; Paul Epworth (add.); Ryan Tedder (add.); Declan Gaffney (add.); Flood (add.)

U2 chronology
| From the Ground Up: Edge's Picks from U2360° (2012) | Songs of Innocence (2014) | Another Time, Another Place: Live at the Marquee London 1980 (2015) |

Alternate cover
- Original iTunes Store release

Singles from Songs of Innocence
- 1. "The Miracle (of Joey Ramone)" Released: 15 September 2014; 2. "Every Breaking Wave" Released: 9 December 2014; 3. "Song for Someone" Released: 11 May 2015

Songs of Innocence is the thirteenth studio album by the Irish rock band U2, released on 9 September 2014. It was produced by Danger Mouse, with additional production from Paul Epworth, Ryan Tedder, Declan Gaffney, and Flood. After the surprise announcement of the album at an Apple product launch event, it was digitally released the same day to all iTunes Store customers at no cost. It was exclusive to iTunes, iTunes Radio, and Beats Music until 13 October 2014, when it was released to retailers by Island and Interscope Records. The digital release made the record available to more than 500 million iTunes customers, for what Apple's CEO Tim Cook called "the largest album release of all time".

After the relatively low sales of U2's previous record, No Line on the Horizon (2009), lead vocalist Bono expressed uncertainty about their relevance. Over five and a half years—the longest gap between U2 albums at that point—the group worked on projects with multiple producers, including Songs of Ascent, an aborted companion to their previous record. However, they struggled to complete an album to their satisfaction and continually delayed a release. After working with Danger Mouse for two years, they collaborated with Flood, Epworth, and Tedder to complete Songs of Innocence. The album revisits the group members' youth in Ireland in the 1970s, touching on childhood memories, loves, and losses, and it pays tribute to musical inspirations of theirs such as the Ramones and the Clash. Bono described it as U2's most personal album.

The lead single, "The Miracle (of Joey Ramone)", was featured in an Apple television advertisement as part of a promotional campaign, on which Apple reportedly spent US$100 million. Approximately 81 million iTunes users listened to Songs of Innocence in its first month, 26 million of whom downloaded the entire record. Songs of Innocence received generally mixed reviews and was criticised for its digital release; it was automatically added to users' iTunes accounts, triggering unprompted downloads to Apple devices for many users.

Upon its retail release, Songs of Innocence sold 101,000 copies in North America and charted for eight weeks in the US and nine weeks in the UK. The record received a Grammy Award nomination for Best Rock Album. U2's press tour was interrupted after Bono was seriously injured in a bicycle accident. Following his recuperation, U2 supported the album with the successful Innocence + Experience Tour in 2015, and released a companion record, Songs of Experience, in 2017. The iTunes release of Songs of Innocence has since been regarded as a marketing misstep that overshadowed the album and hurt the band's reputation.

== Background ==
In February 2009, U2 released their 12th studio album, No Line on the Horizon. The album received generally favourable reviews and debuted at number one in more than 30 countries, but its sales of 5 million units were comparatively low by U2 standards and it did not contain a hit single. Having spent time in Fez, Morocco, recording and absorbing exotic musical influences, the group intended the record to be more experimental than their previous two. However, critics found it to be more conventional than expected. During the five-and-a-half-year gestation period for Songs of Innocence, lead singer Bono expressed uncertainty on several occasions that U2 could remain relevant musically after the relatively lukewarm commercial performance of No Line on the Horizon.

== Writing and recording ==
=== Revelation of Songs of Ascent ===
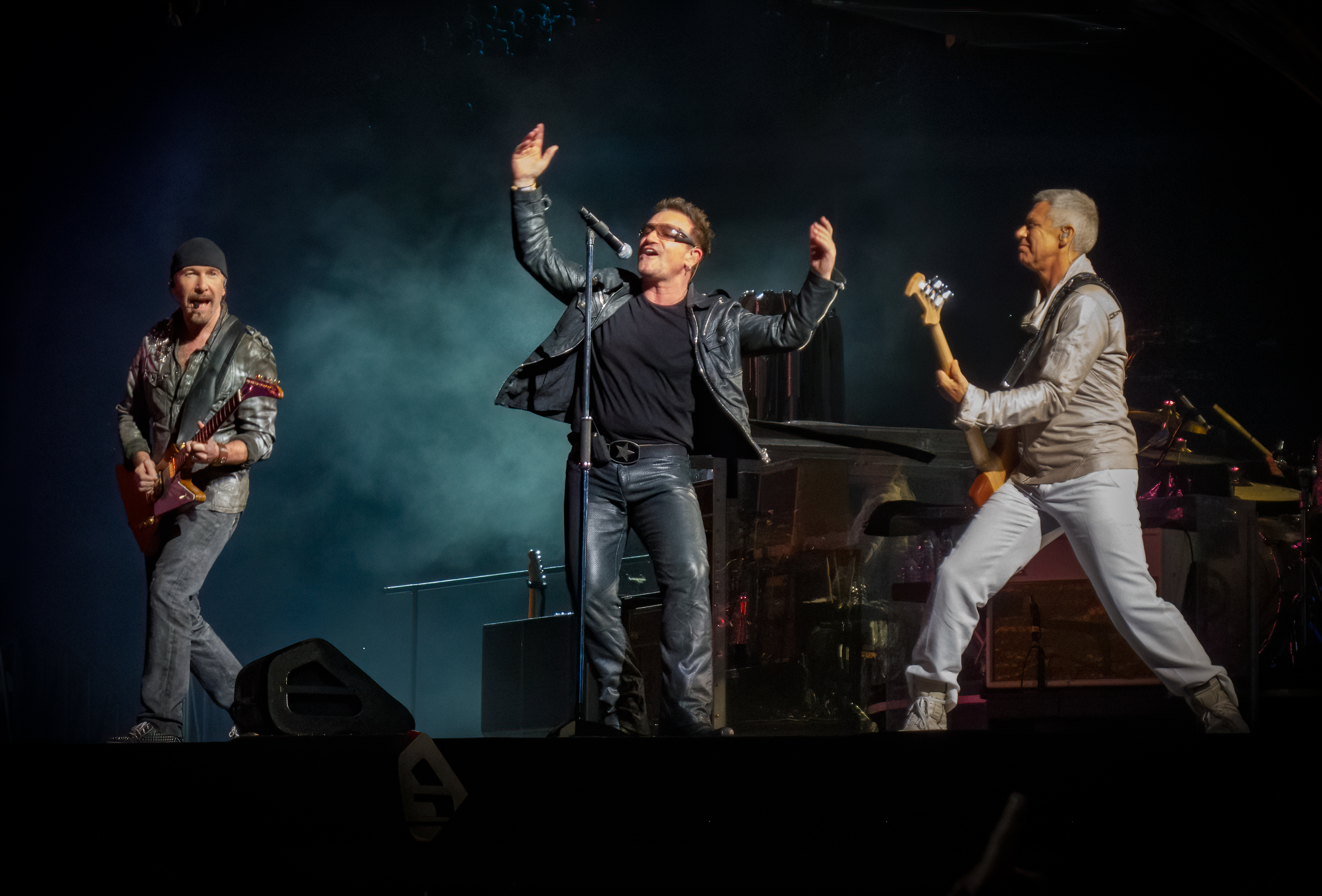
U2 performing in 2010 on the U2 360° Tour. The tour was one of several commitments which limited the group's ability to complete a follow-up to No Line on the Horizon.

Around the release date of No Line on the Horizon, Bono mentioned tentative plans for the group to release a follow-up record of songs from the album's recording sessions called Songs of Ascent. Planned as a sister release to No Line on the Horizon (similar to Zooropa's relationship to Achtung Baby), the project was described by Bono as "a meditative, reflective piece of work" with the theme of pilgrimage. The band said that the first single was intended to be "Every Breaking Wave". However, the project was continually delayed, as U2 struggled to complete an album to their satisfaction and were limited by other commitments; these included the group's U2 360° Tour from 2009 to 2011, as well as Bono's and guitarist the Edge's commitment to writing the music and lyrics to the musical Spider-Man: Turn Off the Dark, which itself experienced numerous delays and creative changes before its debut in June 2011.

In June 2009, Bono said that although the group had nine pieces of music they considered worth pursuing, the album would only be released if its quality surpassed that of No Line on the Horizon. In September, he first made claims that U2 were working on three separate album projects: a "rocking club album" comprising material the group previously wrote with producer Rick Rubin but shelved; the songs that he and the Edge had written for Spider-Man: Turn Off the Dark; and Songs of Ascent. Bassist Adam Clayton was sceptical about Bono's statements, believing their material to still be in its infancy, while the Edge said he was not sure if the Spider-Man songs would be released as a U2 album or a cast recording, adding: "The Spider-Man collection is the most developed but the least appropriate to the band. We've got so much material at different stages of completion, it's going to be a nice problem when we've got a few weeks to look at it." After the band performed at the Brandenburg Gate in Berlin in November, Bono and the Edge traveled to the South of France for a two-week songwriting session, followed by a studio session in New York City in December.

A December 2009 report indicated that U2 had been working in the studio with the goal of a mid-2010 release. By April 2010, U2's manager Paul McGuinness confirmed the group would not be finished by June, but said that a release "before the end of the year is increasingly likely." In May, Bono was forced to undergo emergency back surgery after suffering a compressed sciatic nerve. The group rescheduled their North American tour dates that year and an appearance at Glastonbury Festival 2010 for the following year, but were able to spend their downtime writing and recording new songs.

=== Sessions with Danger Mouse ===
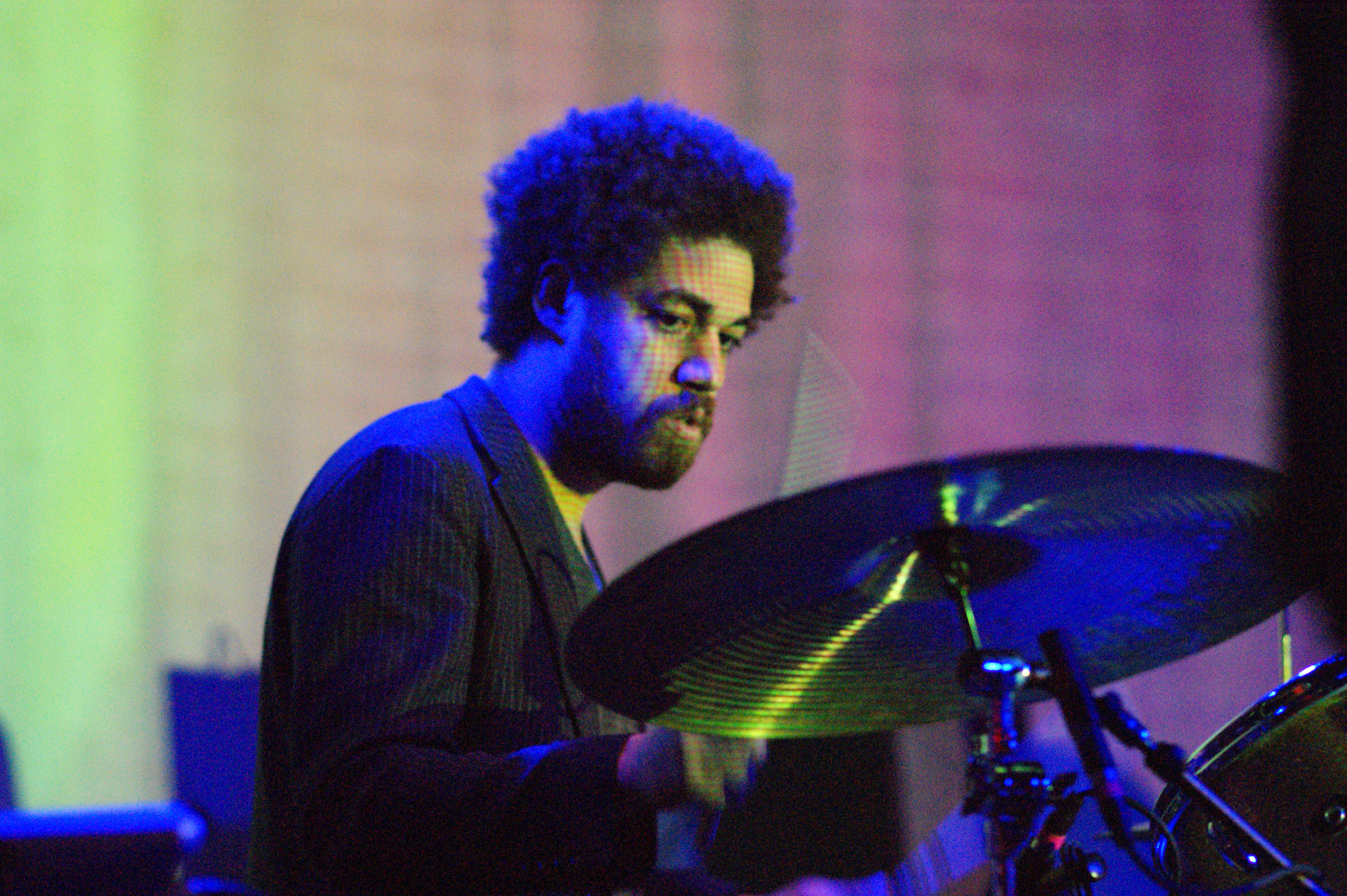
U2 began working with Danger Mouse, the album's primary producer, in 2010.

In August 2010, new reports emerged regarding U2's multiple album projects, claiming that the band were working on: a traditional rock album produced by Brian "Danger Mouse" Burton; a dance-centric album produced by David Guetta, RedOne, and will.i.am; and the meditative material comprising Songs of Ascent. Bono and the Edge continued to express an interest in releasing the songs written for the Spider-Man musical. When the U2 360° Tour resumed that month, the group debuted several unreleased tracks live, including "Every Breaking Wave". In October 2010, Bono said that U2's new album would be produced by Burton, and that 12 songs had been completed, while McGuinness said it was slated for an early 2011 release. Bono described the music from the sessions with Burton as "more airborne, more light-footed". The band continued to make "great progress" on the record in January 2011 working with Burton in New York. However, after holding a creative meeting to review their schedule, they realized they would not be able to complete the record that year; their touring commitments limited their availability to work on the album and they had not yet completed the material written during Bono's rehabilitation.

In February 2011, McGuinness said that the album was almost complete and had a tentative release date of May 2011, although he noted that Songs of Ascent was no longer the likely title. The Songs of Ascent project ultimately did not come to fruition and has not been released; its evolution and apparent abandonment are examined in the book The Greatest Albums You'll Never Hear. Bassist Adam Clayton said: "We thought there was more material left over from No Line... we now feel a long way from that material." The dance-centric album was ultimately aborted as well; Clayton said: "The work we did with RedOne was very, very exciting. But again, I'm not sure it was the essence of what U2 is good at... we have to do what we do best and we have to focus on that, and the work we did with Danger Mouse came closest to that." Guetta clarified in June that he was not involved in the dance project and had only discussed a possible collaboration with Bono.

U2 spent three months in the studio in late 2011, taking a break only for Bono to recuperate from the flu. In June 2012, he appeared on The Late Late Show and said that the group had just concluded its "best three weeks in the studio since 1979". In January 2013, the band members said their new album would be released by September and that its working title was 10 Reasons to Exist. Early that year, at Burton's invitation, Swedish singer Lykke Li travelled to Los Angeles to record backing vocals for the song "The Troubles" without U2 present. In May, U2 spent time at New York's Electric Lady Studios with Burton, who was completing his mixing duties for the record. After working with the band for two years, Burton was forced to return to his side project Broken Bells.

At that point, U2 had a collection of songs that could have been released, but the group were still not satisfied. The Edge said that during mixing: "we found the songs falling apart. They hadn't full arrived. We'd allowed ourselves to think that 'interesting' was enough." The songs, described by Rolling Stone as "guitar-light, electronics heavy, with uncharacteristically subtle choruses", were missing what the Edge called "the hallmarks of [their] work—the big music." The band also took to heart advice that Rubin had given them during recording sessions with him in 2006; Rubin pointed out that the group used unique sounds and arrangements to "disguise the fact that you don't have a song", and he stressed the importance of songcraft and writing music that could play well even when stripped down to vocals and piano.

=== Sessions with Tedder, Epworth, Gaffney, and Flood ===
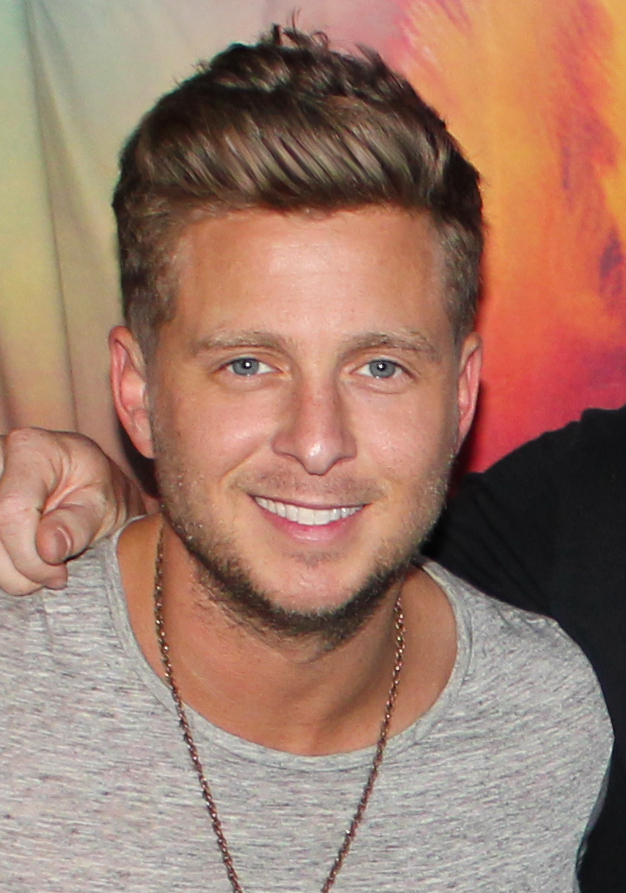
Ryan Tedder was among several producers enlisted by U2 in 2013 to help them complete the album.

The group subsequently enlisted Ryan Tedder, Paul Epworth, Declan Gaffney, and long-time collaborator Flood to help them complete the album, hoping their opposing perspectives from Burton would benefit the songs. Flood's time working on the record briefly overlapped with Burton's, and Gaffney served as U2's recording engineer for the entirety of the album sessions, but otherwise the group worked with each producer separately. Tedder initially critiqued in-progress songs and identified which ones were "worth chasing because [the band] had a limited amount of time". He compared himself to a music critic in the way he had "to sit there and tear their songs apart and give [his] honest opinion". Tedder alternated between working remotely and joining the band in the studio. One of the songs that he changed most was "Every Breaking Wave", as he devised a new chorus melody and moved the old one to the song's bridge.

As U2 continued to work in the studio in mid-2013 with a target release of December, they were asked by film executive Harvey Weinstein to contribute a song to the film Mandela: Long Walk to Freedom. The band suspended work on the album to focus on the track "Ordinary Love", which was written in honour of Nelson Mandela. It won the 2014 Golden Globe Award for Best Original Song, and was nominated for the Academy Award for Best Original Song. Progress on their album was further limited by a period of mourning after Mandela's death, the group's promotional commitments for the film, and the awards ceremonies. In November 2013, Billboard reported that the band's new album had a tentative release date of April 2014, and that it would be announced in a Super Bowl television advertisement. Instead, another new U2 song, the single "Invisible", was unveiled in the Super Bowl advertisement in February 2014. The song was released digitally in the iTunes Store at no cost to launch a partnership with Product Red and Bank of America to fight AIDS. Bono said the track was not the lead single from its pending record but rather a "sneak preview – to remind people we exist".

With U2 having released two standalone singles written during their sessions with him, Burton admitted in March 2014 that he did not know the fate of the record or if he was even still its producer. That month, Billboard reported that the album and its supporting tour would be pushed back until 2015, which was denied by a spokesperson for the band. The report also stated that U2 had scheduled additional recording sessions with Tedder and Epworth; the band were seen shortly thereafter with Epworth in London and believed to be working at Church Studios. In mid-2014, Li met up with the band in London to re-record her vocals for "The Troubles" after they decided to change the song's key. After trying a few different approaches to her vocals, Li said, "We turned off all the music and sang only to the drums, so it was really getting to what the core of the song meant."

U2's partnership with Apple Inc. for the album release ultimately imposed a much-needed deadline by which to complete the record. Burton returned to help the group during the final sessions. They spent the final month working with Gaffney in Malibu, California. The Edge said: "the bulk of it was done pretty quickly at the end. So much was achieved in the last couple of weeks." He described the last four days in particular as "full-on". The album was completed on 2 September 2014, one week prior to its release. At that point, the band delivered a 10-track version of the album to Apple and opted to exclude the song "Volcano", as it was unfinished. However, the group subsequently had a crisis of faith, believing the record sounded "lopsided". After convincing Apple to give them a couple more days, the band finished the song and included it on the final version of the album.

Over the course of the recording sessions, the band worked on what Bono estimated to be 50 songs. The Edge said they had about 25 songs from which to choose, five of which were still very much in a rough state. Bono said that the songwriting process was humbling, as the group were able to get some songs "halfway up the hill, three-quarters of the way up the hill. A lot of times, we just couldn't get them up to the top of the hill." Speaking about the record's long gestation period, Bono said: "Rumour has it we haven't made a U2 album in the last five years. We have. We've made several. We just didn't release them because we were waiting for something that would be as good as the best we've ever done."

== Composition ==
According to music journalist Jon Pareles, Songs of Innocence features U2 strictly playing rock music, particularly arena rock, whose elaborate production "puts a higher gloss, and sometimes a heavier fuzz tone, on the band's instantly recognizable sound". Thematically, Songs of Innocence revisits the group members' youth in Ireland in the 1970s, touching on childhood memories, loves, and losses, while paying tribute to their musical inspirations. Bono described it as "the most personal album we've written". In an interview with Gus Wenner of Rolling Stone, he said, "Let's try to figure out why we wanted to be in a band, the relationships around the band, our friendships, our lovers, our family. The whole album is first journeys—first journeys geographically, spiritually, sexually." He said that he felt challenged to write about more personal themes and why he wanted to be in a rock band after producer Jimmy Iovine told him, "The person you need to be to make the album that you wanna make is a long way from where you live." Rolling Stone deemed Songs of Innocence as having the feeling of a concept album, a notion that Bono rejected, although he did opine it was lyrically cohesive in a way the group's other records were not. For the album, the group revisited adolescent musical influences, such as punk rock band Ramones and electronic music group Kraftwerk, for inspiration. Opening track "The Miracle (of Joey Ramone)" pays tribute to Joey Ramone, the Ramones' lead singer who was particularly influential on Bono. During their teenage years, U2 snuck into a Ramones concert, and the experience of watching Joey perform made Bono feel less self-conscious about his own singing. "Every Breaking Wave" is about the difficulty of "giv[ing] yourself completely to another person", with lyrical characters who are "addicted to sort of failure and rebirth". "California (There Is No End to Love)" recalls the group's first visit to Los Angeles and how the city contrasted with their native Dublin. "Song for Someone" is a love song Bono wrote for his wife Ali Hewson, who he met during their teenage years. "Iris (Hold Me Close)" is written about Bono's mother, Iris, who died after suffering a cerebral aneurysm at her father's funeral when Bono was 14 years old. The lyrics liken her influence over her son to a star that died long ago but whose light is still reaching earth. Bono rewrote the song's lyrics after reading a letter that journalist James Foley wrote in captivity to his family prior to his being killed by ISIS; the letters made Bono realize that "we will all be remembered by the least-profound moments. The simplest moments."

The lyrics for "Volcano" are written from the perspective of a younger Bono addressing his modern-day self; he said, "It's this young guy going, 'The fuck happened to you?'" The Edge composed the song's bass intro. "Raised by Wolves" is about the Dublin and Monaghan bombings of 1974, which killed 33 people but were narrowly avoided by Bono that day. The song is written from the perspective of Andy Rowen (brother of Bono's childhood friend Guggi), whose presence at the bombings would later drive him into heroin addiction, a subject also addressed in U2's 1984 song "Bad". "Cedarwood Road" reminisces about the street in Dublin on which Bono lived during his youth. The cherry blossom tree referenced in the lyrics was from the Rowen family garden. "Sleep Like a Baby Tonight", written about a pedophile priest, was described by Q's Tom Doyle as featuring "deceptively lullaby-like... synth pulses" reminiscent of Kraftwerk. Their album The Man-Machine was gifted by Bono to Ali when they were dating as teenagers and is name-checked in "Iris (Hold Me Close)" in the line, "But it was you who made me your man/Machine". "This Is Where You Can Reach Me Now" takes musical cues from one of the group's childhood inspirations, the Clash; according to the liner notes, the song is dedicated to the Clash's guitarist/vocalist Joe Strummer. The lyrics were inspired by Bono's realisation that he had found a new family and home in the form of U2, having felt like his childhood house was no longer home after his mother's death. The closing track, "The Troubles", was described by Bono as "an uncomfortable song about domestic violence".

The deluxe editions of the album feature two additional songs. "Lucifer's Hands" is based on an instrumental piece titled "Return of the Stingray Guitar" that U2 debuted live in 2010 and performed as the opening song at each of their 32 concerts that year. "The Crystal Ballroom" is written about the former Dublin nightclub of the same name (later known as McGonagle's) where the band frequently performed in their early years. Lyrically, Bono imagines himself on-stage at the venue witnessing his parents dancing in the audience.

== Packaging and title ==
The album art for iTunes copies of the album was created by MAD Agency London to resemble white label packaging commonly used for promotional LP record pressings. The artwork, an "anti-cover design", is a homage to the vinyl promo release format that was popular during the late 1970s and early 1980s, a period referenced by U2 on the album.

Physical copies of the album feature different packaging with a cover image of drummer Larry Mullen Jr. protectively embracing his then-18-year-old son while both are shirtless. The image was taken by photographer Glen Luchford initially as an experiment, but the group thought it worked as a visual metaphor for the album and its theme of "how holding on to your own innocence is a lot harder than holding on to someone else's". Bono said, "With this record we were looking for the raw, naked and personal, to strip everything back." According to Bono, the tattoo on Mullen's upper arm is based on Native American mythology of the Pawnee tribe and is a symbol of protecting innocence. The cover parallels those of the band's earlier albums, Boy (1980) and War (1983), which featured the face of a young boy, Peter Rowen, the younger brother of Bono's childhood friend, Guggi.

The album's title, along with that of the group's 2017 follow-up, Songs of Experience, are taken from William Blake's collection of poems Songs of Innocence and of Experience.

== Release ==
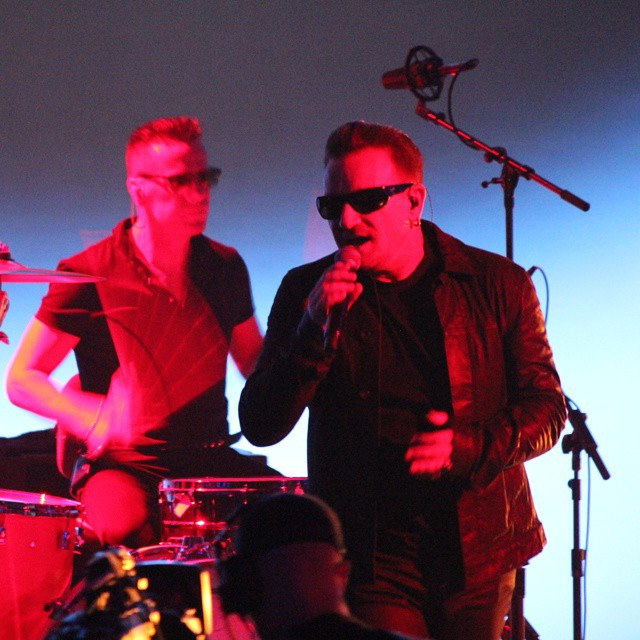
U2 performing "The Miracle (of Joey Ramone)" at the Apple product launch during which the album was announced on 9 September 2014

In the days leading up to an Apple product launch event on 9 September 2014 in Cupertino, California, rumours circulated that U2 would be involved. A spokesperson for the band denied reports that they would perform at the event or that a new album would come preloaded on the anticipated new iPhone 6 smartphone. During the event, after the unveiling of the new iPhone and Apple Watch, U2 appeared on stage and performed a new song entitled "The Miracle (of Joey Ramone)". Afterwards, Apple CEO Tim Cook joined them to make a surprise announcement that their 13th studio album, Songs of Innocence, had been completed and would be digitally released that day to all iTunes Store customers at no cost. Bono called the album "a gift [from Apple]... to all their music customers", and said that the group wanted to "get [the album] to as many people as possible, because that's what our band is all about". The record was automatically added to the "purchased" section of users' iTunes music libraries. It was exclusive to iTunes and the streaming services iTunes Radio and Beats Music until 13 October 2014, when it was commercially released and the no-cost promotion within the iTunes Store lapsed. The Edge called the album launch "incredibly subversive", adding, "It's really punk rock, it's really disruptive." Songs of Innocence was made available to more than 500 million iTunes customers in 119 countries, for what Cook marketed as "the largest album release of all time".

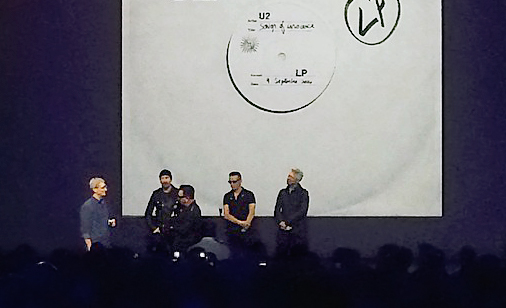
Apple CEO Tim Cook and the members of U2 on stage during the album's announcement

Bono rejected the notion that U2 had given the album away at no cost, saying: "We were paid. I don't believe in free music. Music is a sacrament." Apple reportedly paid a lump sum to the band and Universal Music Group (UMG) for a five-week exclusivity window in which to distribute Songs of Innocence. According to Billboard's estimates, Apple could have paid either US$52 million to UMG for exclusive rights to the album based on the quantity of downloads, or an upfront fee of about $5 million excluding royalties. In addition, Apple agreed to a marketing campaign for the album reportedly worth around $100 million, which kicked off with a television advertisement featuring "The Miracle (of Joey Ramone)". Apple's partnership with U2 dates back to 2004; in promotion of the band's album How to Dismantle an Atomic Bomb, its first single, "Vertigo", was featured in an internationally aired iPod television advertisement, while a U2 iPod and an iTunes-exclusive U2 digital box set were also released. The release of Songs of Innocence drew comparisons to that of two 2013 records by a husband-wife duo: Jay-Z's Magna Carta Holy Grail, which was sponsored by Samsung; and Beyoncé's self-titled album, which also was released without any prior promotion or notice.

To placate physical retailers affected by the digital exclusivity period, Universal offered them a deluxe version of Songs of Innocence that contains four additional songs, along with several acoustic versions of the record's songs. The bonus tracks were exclusive to brick-and-mortar stores and music streaming services for five weeks. The iTunes Store then released the ten deluxe edition tracks under the title Songs of Innocence + on 18 November 2014. Retailers also received catalogue deals that discounted U2's albums in stores by $3 for a period of time. A Grammy Awards spokesperson initially said the album would not be eligible for consideration at the 57th Annual Grammy Awards because it would not have been available for purchase prior to the 30 September eligibility deadline. However, the ruling was reversed after UMG released a limited-edition vinyl pressing of the album to retailers on the cutoff date.

The same day as Songs of Innocence's digital release, Irish public service broadcaster RTÉ played the record in its entirety on RTÉ 2fm. This was in line with a long-standing tradition of U2 giving the station's DJ Dave Fanning the exclusive to play their new albums before any other broadcaster.

=== Effectiveness, controversy and reaction ===
According to Apple, 33 million people accessed the album in its first week of release, either through iTunes downloads or streaming. Within its first month of release, 81 million users had listened to it and 26 million had downloaded the entire record, according to Apple executive Eddy Cue.

U2's decision to allow free downloads of Songs of Innocence was questioned by musicians, including the Black Keys drummer Patrick Carney and Pink Floyd drummer Nick Mason. Buckcherry guitarist Keith Nelson believed it devalued music, saying U2 had "sent a message to everyone that music is free, and that's disturbing. It's easy to do that when you're a multi-millionaire-billionaire and money isn't really something that you worry about, but when you're a working rock 'n' roll band and you count on every dollar, it's disappointing to see someone do that." The Entertainment Retailers Association reported that UK sales of the band's back catalogue were minimal in the week following the album's release. The organisation's chairman Paul Quirk said: "This vindicates our view that giving away hundreds of millions of albums simply devalues music and runs the risk of alienating the 60% of the population who are not customers of iTunes ... Giving away music like this is as damaging to the value of music as piracy."

Many iTunes customers were unhappy that the album was added to their music libraries without their consent. For users with automatic music downloads enabled in iTunes, Songs of Innocence downloaded automatically to their electronic devices. Chris Richards of The Washington Post called the release "rock-and-roll as dystopian junk mail". Slate said that it was "extremely unsettling" that "consent and interest are no longer a requisite for owning an album, only corporate prerogative". Vijith Assar of Wired said, "The delivery mechanism amounts to nothing more than spam with forced downloads." In response to the criticism, Apple created a dedicated page on their website to allow users to delete the album from their iTunes accounts. Bono said he was initially unaware of the automatic download option. Former U2 manager Paul McGuinness thought the album had been "positioned wrongly" and would not have offended anyone had there been an opt-in method to receive it. Describing U2's and Apple's intentions, Bono said: "We wanted to deliver a pint of milk to people's front porches, but in a few cases it ended up in their fridge, on their cereal. People were like, 'I'm dairy-free.'" Although he apologized to a fan during a Facebook Q&A session for the album's addition to their music library, publicly he refused to offer an apology at the time, saying, "It's one of the proudest moments in U2's history." In his 2022 memoir Surrender: 40 Songs, One Story, however, Bono apologized for the album's digital release: "I take full responsibility... I'd thought if we could just put our music within reach of people, they might choose to reach out toward it. Not quite."

Despite the poor press surrounding the release, an independent study of select iOS users by Kantar Group found that in January 2015, 23 percent of music listeners played at least one song by U2, more than any other artist for that month. The study also found that of those participants who listened to U2's music, 95 percent of them accessed at least one track from Songs of Innocence.

=== Other projects ===
In a note on the group's website announcing Songs of Innocence, Bono revealed plans for a follow-up album, Songs of Experience, saying that it "should be ready soon enough". After three years of work, U2 released Songs of Experience on 1 December 2017. The album is thematically a collection of letters written by Bono to people and places closest to his heart. The lyrics reflect a "brush with mortality" that he had, as well as the shift of global politics in a conservative direction.

U2's manager Guy Oseary also indicated that the group had future collaborations with Apple planned dealing with "how music is heard and innovation". He said the band wanted to support albums as an "art form of artwork and lyrics and video content" that would engage listeners more so than digital audio. In a 29 September 2014 cover story for Time, U2 said they were working with Apple to develop a new digital music format they hoped would sway consumers' interest in purchasing music again. Bono described it as "an audiovisual interactive format for music that can't be pirated and will bring back album artwork in the most powerful way, where you can play with the lyrics and get behind the songs". He said the format was 18 months from completion and that the group hoped it would financially benefit lesser-known music artists. A source told Billboard that Bono's use of the word "format" was a misnomer, clarifying: "It's not a new format, but rather a new way to package and present an album. This is focused on creative advances, versus shifts in technology."

On 8 December 2014, a visual companion to the album, Films of Innocence, was unveiled. Inspired by political murals of Northern Ireland, U2 enlisted 11 urban artists to create their own art films, each interpreting a different song from the album. The artists involved in the collaboration were Robin Rhode, D*Face, Mode 2, Chloe Early, Ganzeer, Vhils, Maser, ROA, DALeast, Todd James, and Oliver Jeffers. The collection of films was made available for purchase on iTunes and Amazon.com.

=== Promotion ===
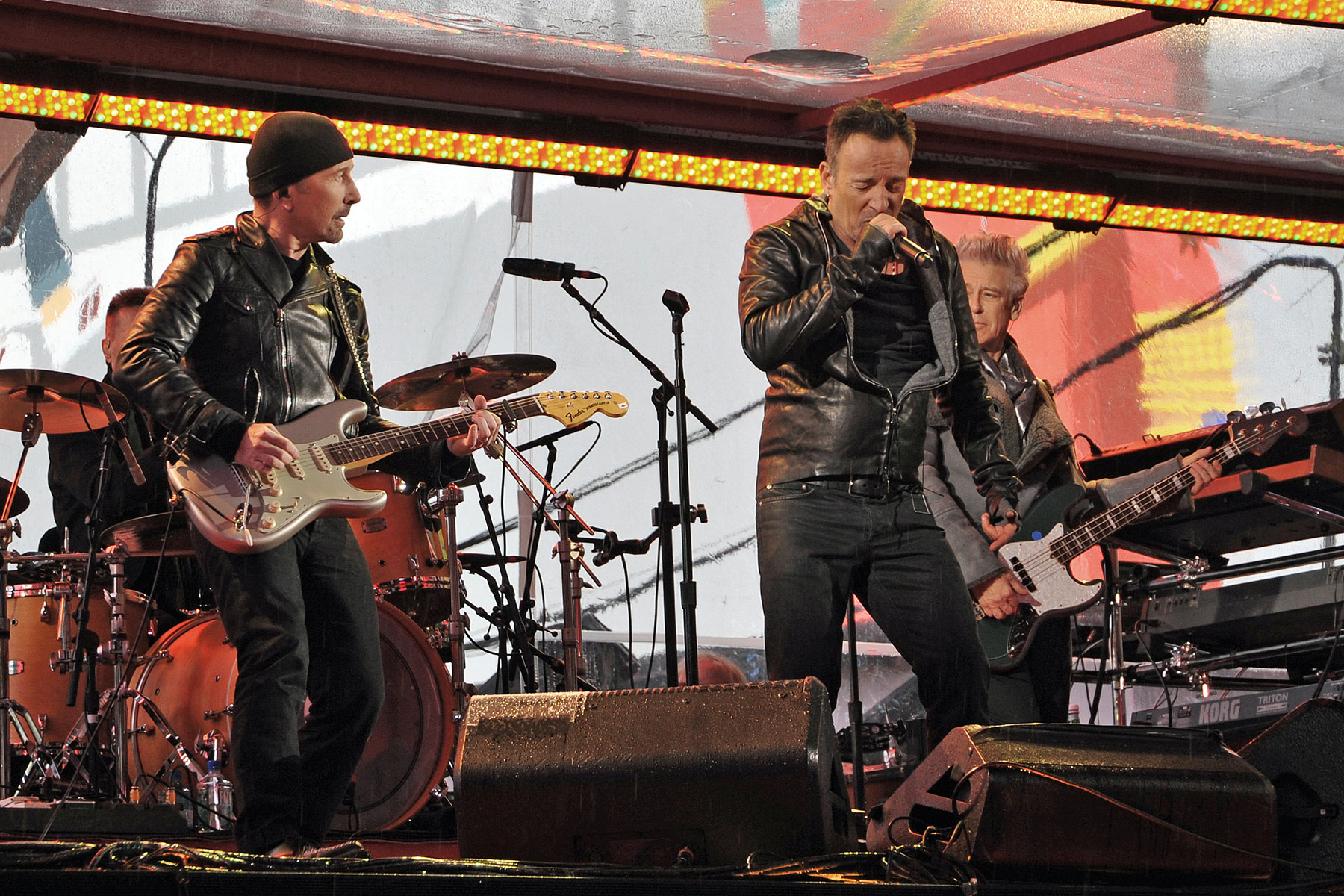
U2 perform at the 2014 World AIDS Day Concert, with Bruce Springsteen filling in for an injured Bono as vocalist

To promote the album, the band made appearances on several television and radio programs, including RAI TV's Che tempo che fa in Milan, Canal+'s Le Grand Journal in Paris, BBC One's The Graham Norton Show and BBC Radio 2 in London, BBC Two's Later... with Jools Holland, and RTÉ One's The Late Late Show in Dublin. The group also performed "Every Breaking Wave" at the 2014 MTV Europe Music Awards. The promotional tour was interrupted when Bono was injured in a "high energy bicycle accident" in Central Park on 16 November 2014. He suffered fractures of his shoulder blade, humerus, orbit, and pinky finger, requiring five hours of surgery at NewYork–Presbyterian Hospital/Weill Cornell Medical Center's Emergency Department. Bono said he was uncertain that he would ever be able to play guitar again. The injury forced the band to cancel a headlining appearance at KROQ Almost Acoustic Christmas, as well as a week-long residency as the musical guest on The Tonight Show Starring Jimmy Fallon. The other three members of U2 kept a commitment to perform in Times Square on World AIDS Day on 1 December 2014; Chris Martin of Coldplay and Bruce Springsteen filled in as lead vocalists. U2 returned to The Tonight Show on 8 May 2015, and participated in sketches in which they mocked Bono's bicycle injury and busked in a New York City Subway station in disguise. The group also unveiled a video previewing their Innocence + Experience Tour. To recompense the Los Angeles area for dropping out of KROQ Almost Acoustic Christmas, the band performed for 500 fans at the Roxy Theatre in Hollywood on 28 May 2015 while between shows of their arena tour.

U2 licensed several tracks from Songs of Innocence for use in the 2015 music video game Rock Band 4; "Cedarwood Road" was included with the game, while "The Miracle (of Joey Ramone)" and "California (There Is No End to Love)" were made available as downloadable content.

Chris Milk and his company Vrse produced a 360-degree virtual reality video featuring U2 that was released in October 2015. Presented by Apple Music, the video was promoted in an Apple-branded bus, dubbed "The Experience Bus", that was located outside The O2 Arena prior to the band's London concerts on the Innocence + Experience Tour. The bus was equipped with Oculus Rift headsets and Beats Solos headphones for fans to use to view the video. It was also released through Vrse's mobile app. The video combines footage of U2 performing "Song for Someone" inside an empty Toronto venue with clips of fans worldwide also playing the song. Production on the project began two months before Apple Music's launch and saw filming take place in 11 countries.

== Critical reception ==
Professional ratings
Aggregate scores
| Source | Rating |
|---|---|
| AnyDecentMusic? | 6.0/10 |
| Metacritic | 64/100 |
Review scores
| Source | Rating |
| AllMusic | 3/5 stars |
| Chicago Tribune | 2/4 stars |
| The Daily Telegraph | 4/5 stars |
| The Guardian | 3/5 stars |
| Mojo | 4/5 stars |
| NME | 4/10 |
| Pitchfork | 4.6/10 |
| Rolling Stone | 5/5 stars |
| Slant Magazine | 3/5 stars |
| Spin | 7/10 |

Songs of Innocence received generally mixed reviews from critics. At Metacritic, which assigns a normalised rating out of 100 to reviews from mainstream critics, the album received an average score of 64 out of 100, based on 32 reviews. At AnyDecentMusic?, which collates reviews from more than 50 media sources, the album scored 6.0 out of 10, based on 28 reviews.

Rob Mitchum of Pitchfork criticised Songs of Innocence for "aim[ing] for a one-size-fits-all, vaguely inspirational tone, with a lean approach to details despite the press kit assertion that it's all 'very, very personal'". Greg Kot of the Chicago Tribune said U2 "sounded as impersonal as ever" and that the album was "flat and strangely complacent", while finding the more personal songs derivative of contemporary rock bands such as Imagine Dragons and Airborne Toxic Event. In a review for The Guardian, Caspar Llewellyn Smith wrote that U2 was "treading old ground without much of a sense of how to move forward." Ben Patashnik of NME said only "Iris", "Song for Someone", and "Every Breaking Wave" were "standouts", and he criticised the release strategy, judging "the fact it's free makes it seem cheap." Sal Cinquemani from Slant Magazine deemed the album a thematic success that was "otherwise marred by the kind of slick MOR pablum that plagued the band's last few efforts". Stephen Thomas Erlewine from AllMusic felt U2 did not challenge themselves sonically and that the album represents the contradictions in the band's music: "They camouflage their nostalgia in the sound of modernity; they play gigantic music about intimacy... They want to be everything to everyone and, in attempting to do so, they've wound up with a record that appeals to a narrow audience".

In a positive review, Neil McCormick of The Daily Telegraph called Songs of Innocence "fresh and cohesive... an album of big, colourful, attacking rock with fluid melodies, bright anthemic choruses and bold lyrical ideas." In Rolling Stone, David Fricke wrote that the record was a "triumph of dynamic, focused renaissance" and "the first time U2 have told their own tales so directly, with the strengths and expression they have accumulated as songwriters and record-makers." Spin's Carl Wilson said the album's songs were "more compact and direct, and eschew the global-overmind scale" of U2's previous material "for intimate and personal perspectives." Wilson praised U2 for hiring contemporary producers to help them "join rather than beat the 2014 mainstream". Tom Doyle of Mojo called Songs of Innocence "the most startlingly fresh, energetic and cohesive U2 album in years," praising the personal themes. He felt that the album "reconnects U2 with the strident, searching, wide awake band of their nascency, reminding not only us, but themselves, of their against-the-odds beginnings". In The New York Times, Jon Pareles said that he found the record enjoyable for its grandiose musical style and emotionally varied, nostalgic lyrics: "The songs ground philosophical musings and high-flown imagery in concrete reminiscences and events."

=== Accolades ===
Songs of Innocence appeared on critics' end-of-year rankings of the best albums of 2014. Rolling Stone ranked it as the best album of 2014, calling it "the emotionally raw rock album of the year, at any price", while suggesting that "In its range of sounds, there may be no more complete U2 album." The selection proved controversial; according to a 2017 biography on Rolling Stone founder Jann Wenner entitled Sticky Fingers, Wenner allegedly dictated the ranking due to his friendship with Bono, saying: "My dictate. By fiat, buddy. That's that." The magazine later ranked the album the 93rd-best of the 2010s.

Mojo placed the record 33rd on its list of the "50 Best Albums of 2014". The Telegraph ranked the record the 14th-best of the year, while Q placed it at number 44 on its list. In contrast, Randall Roberts of Los Angeles Times named it the worst release of 2014. For the 57th Annual Grammy Awards, Songs of Innocence was nominated for Best Rock Album.

== Commercial performance ==
The album's no-cost availability on iTunes delayed its eligibility for placement on music charts until its 13 October commercial release, which was widely expected to reduce its sales. In the UK, Songs of Innocence sold 15,998 copies in its first week and debuted at number six on the UK Albums Chart, U2's lowest UK debut in 33 years; it spent only nine weeks on the chart. In the US, the album charted for just eight weeks on the Billboard 200, debuting at number nine and selling 28,000 copies in its first week. According to Nielsen Soundscan, 101,000 copies of the record have been sold in North America, while 66,003 copies sold in the UK through December 2017, according to data from the Official Charts Company. In the band's native Ireland, the album debuted at number two on the Irish Albums Chart. In Canada, the album debuted at number five on the Canadian Albums Chart, selling 4,600 copies in its first week before dropping off the chart. Songs of Innocence became U2's first album to not reach number one in Ireland or Canada since The Unforgettable Fire in 1984. The album reached number one in Croatia, Czech Republic, France, Italy, the Netherlands, Poland, and Spain.

== Innocence + Experience Tour ==
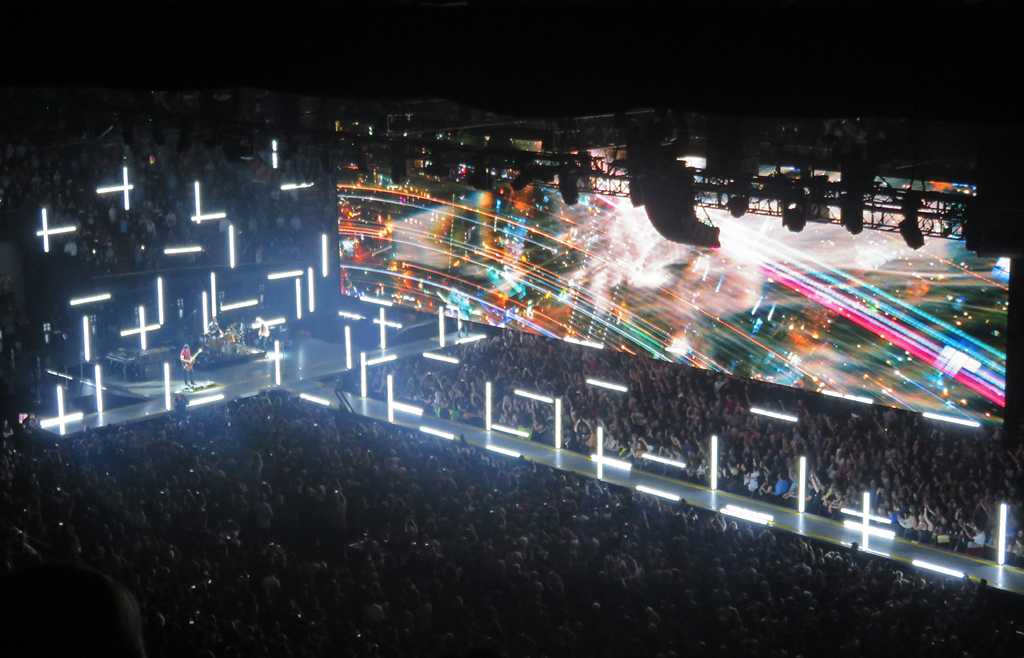
The centerpiece of the Innocence + Experience Tour's set was a 96-foot-long "video cage" that was suspended over the walkway connecting the main stage and B-stage.

On 14 May 2015, U2 embarked on a worldwide concert tour called the Innocence + Experience Tour. It was U2's first time playing arenas since 2005–2006 on their Vertigo Tour. Comprising 76 shows over two legs, the tour visited North America from May through July, and Europe from September through December. The band structured their concerts around a loose narrative of "innocence" passing into "experience", with a fixed set of songs for the first half of each show and a varying second half, separated by an intermission–a first for U2 concerts. The stage spanned the length of the venue floor and comprised three sections: a rectangular segment that illuminated as an "I" to represent "innocence"; a smaller circular stage that illuminated as an "e" to represent "experience"; and a walkway between them to represent the transition between the two themes. A 96-foot-long (29 m) double-sided video screen was suspended above and parallel to the walkway; the structure featured an interior catwalk between the screens, allowing the band members to perform amidst the video projections. U2's sound system was moved to the venue ceilings and arranged in an oval array, in hopes of improving acoustics by evenly distributing sound throughout the arena. In total, the tour grossed $152.2 million from 1.29 million tickets sold. The final date of the tour, one of two Paris shows rescheduled due to the 13 November 2015 attacks in the city, was filmed for the video Innocence + Experience: Live in Paris and broadcast on the American television network HBO.

== Legacy ==
The negative publicity from Songs of Innocence's iTunes release was regarded as detrimental to U2's reputation. Rolling Stone ranked the iTunes release the 9th-worst decision in music history and the record itself the 42nd-most disappointing album ever; journalist Andy Greene wrote that the band's mentality of "thinking big" served them well earlier in their career but that they overstepped in making the album "show up for free to every single Apple user's personal devices. We're talking about a non-insignificant percent of planet Earth here, and it was quickly revealed that not everyone who owned a phone was by definition a U2 fan. The backlash was swift and brutal, especially since Songs of Innocence wasn't exactly another Joshua Tree or Achtung Baby in terms of quality." Greene believed that the album was not deserving of the mockery it received but called the iTunes release an "inexplicably dunderhead" decision. He wrote, "It was the wrong album at the wrong time, and it damaged their brand in huge ways, fairly or not." In 2016, David Sackllah of Consequence of Sound said, "U2 and Apple deserve credit for thinking ambitiously, but they overestimated the band's relevance with fans, and many felt like the automatic download constituted an invasion of privacy." Ed Power of The Telegraph labeled the promotion "the most idiotic launch in rock history" and attributed it to two factors: the determination of Apple CEO Tim Cook to "prove himself worthy of the groovy tech guru mantle he had inherited from his far more charismatic predecessor, the late Steve Jobs", and U2's "obsess[ion] with being the biggest band in the world". In end-of-decade retrospectives, Rolling Stone and Billboard included the album's no-cost iTunes release on their lists of the top music moments that defined the decade; Billboard said: "The failed strategy showed the perils of embedding music within technology so deeply (and so quasi-literally), and today, most Apple subscribers couldn't tell you a thing about Songs of Innocence besides the backlash."

In a 2019 reassessment of Songs of Innocence, Uproxx critic Steven Hyden said that he had overreacted in his original review and that after revisiting the record, he believed it was the band's best work since Zooropa in 1993. Reflecting on the iTunes release, he still thought it was a misguided idea, blaming it on U2's "fail[ure] to grasp a fundamental truth of modern consumer culture: People now care way more about their phones than any individual album". Hyden called it "the biggest music-related PR disaster of the decade", but argued that the backlash against U2 was ultimately unwarranted given how media consumption habits changed in the following years: "technology, along with listener habits, also moved on. Just five years later, the idea of curating a music collection on your phone is kind of quaint for the average listener. In the streaming era, every album appears on your phone, week after week." Hyden believed that it was naive of people to criticise the band for potentially heralding in a "slippery slope" of "soft-rock doomsday scenarios", yet still expect their own listening habits on streaming services such as Spotify or Apple Music to be private: "As listeners, we freely give this information away, with only faint recognition that this data is also commodified and sold to advertisers and marketers." In a 2024 retrospective for The A.V. Club, Stephen Thomas Erlewine said the concerns that the album raised with how music artists could be compensated for their work were rendered mostly obsolete as streaming services and subscription plans became ubiquitous in subsequent years. Reflecting on the record itself, Erlewine believed that the thematic narrative U2 had intended for it was clouded by their working with too many producers and by Tedder's "glib sentimentality and glassy melodies", saying, "Somewhere underneath that processed clamor and yearning desire for relevance lies a modest, moving account of an artist attempting to come to terms with their fate by questioning their beginnings."

On the 10th anniversary of Songs of Innocence, Chris DeVille of Stereogum said that it was considered by U2 fans to be "another merely OK chapter in the band's slow slide into mediocrity" and that non-fans were "so offended at its presence on their phones that the album's quality (or lack thereof) became secondary to its status as one of the great modern PR flubs". Upon revisiting the music, he said it was "not the turgid slog [he] remembered" but that it was ultimately an "extremely generic album, polished but insubstantial" and that it comprised a "parade of tracks that sound like soulless U2 facsimiles". DeVille thought the record itself was always destined to be overshadowed by its iTunes distribution, resulting in it becoming "an annoyance, a meme, and a symbol of an Orwellian future in which giant corporations crowd out music of your own selection with unwanted albums that are all but impossible to delete from your device".

== Track listing ==
All lyrics are written by Bono and The Edge; all music is composed by U2.

| No. | Title | Producer(s) | Length |
|---|---|---|---|
| 1. | "The Miracle (of Joey Ramone)" | Danger Mouse; Paul Epworth; Ryan Tedder | 4:15 |
| 2. | "Every Breaking Wave" | Danger Mouse; Tedder; Declan Gaffney^{[a]} | 4:12 |
| 3. | "California (There Is No End to Love)" | Gaffney; Epworth; Danger Mouse | 3:59 |
| 4. | "Song for Someone" | Tedder; Flood | 3:46 |
| 5. | "Iris (Hold Me Close)" | Epworth; Tedder; Danger Mouse^{[a]} | 5:19 |
| 6. | "Volcano" | Gaffney; Epworth^{[a]} | 3:14 |
| 7. | "Raised by Wolves" | Gaffney; Danger Mouse | 4:05 |
| 8. | "Cedarwood Road" | Danger Mouse; Epworth | 4:25 |
| 9. | "Sleep Like a Baby Tonight" | Danger Mouse | 5:01 |
| 10. | "This Is Where You Can Reach Me Now" | Danger Mouse | 5:05 |
| 11. | "The Troubles" (featuring Lykke Li) | Danger Mouse; Gaffney^{[a]} | 4:45 |
| Total length: | | | 48:11 |

Vinyl release bonus track
| No. | Title | Length |
|---|---|---|
| 12. | "The Crystal Ballroom" (12" mix) | 7:30 |

Deluxe edition bonus tracks
| No. | Title | Length |
|---|---|---|
| 1. | "Lucifer's Hands" | 3:55 |
| 2. | "The Crystal Ballroom" | 4:40 |
| 3. | "Acoustic Sessions": 1. "Every Breaking Wave"; 2. "California (There Is No End to Love)"; 3. "Raised by Wolves"; 4. "Cedarwood Road"; 5. "Song for Someone"; 6. "The Miracle (of Joey Ramone)" (Busker Version)" | 22:49 |
| 4. | "The Troubles" (Alternative Version) | 4:32 |
| 5. | "Sleep Like a Baby Tonight" (Alternative Perspective Mix by Tchad Blake) (includes "Invisible" as a hidden track) | 11:06 |
| Total length: | | 46:58 |

Japanese deluxe edition additional bonus tracks
| No. | Title | Length |
|---|---|---|
| 6. | "Invisible" | 4:45 |
| 7. | "The Crystal Ballroom" (12" mix) | 7:27 |

Notes

- ^{^[a]} – additional production

== Personnel ==
Adapted from the liner notes.

U2

- Bono – lead vocals, keyboards (tracks 1, 3–5, 7, 9–11), additional guitar (1, 6, 9), dulcimer (2)
- The Edge – guitar, backing vocals, keyboards (1–8, 10–11), programming (5)
- Adam Clayton – bass guitar, keyboards (5)
- Larry Mullen Jr. – drums, percussion, backing vocals (3, 10)

Additional performers

- Brian "Danger Mouse" Burton – keyboards (tracks 1–2, 7–11), programming (7), additional percussion (10), choral arrangement (6)
- Ryan Tedder – keyboards (1–2, 4–5), programming (1), acoustic guitar (1)
- Paul Epworth – keyboards (1, 3, 8), programming (1), additional percussion (1), claps (6), additional slide guitar (8)
- Flood – keyboards (4)
- Declan Gaffney – acoustic guitar (1, 6), keyboards (2–8, 10–11), programming (3, 7, 9), backing vocals (3, 10), claps (6), additional percussion (7), vocal effects (7)
- Lykke Li – vocals (11)
- "Classy" Joe Visciano – claps (6), backing vocals (10)
- Leo Pearson – keyboards (9)
- Caroline Dale – cello (11), string arrangement (11)
- Natalia Bonner – violin (11)
- Greg Clark – choir (1, 6)
- Carlos Ricketts – choir (1, 6)
- Tabitha Fair – choir (1, 6)
- Kim Hill – choir (1, 6)
- Quiona McCollum – choir (1, 6)
- Nicki Richards – choir (1, 6)
- Everett Bradley – choir (1, 6)
- Bobby Harden – choir (1, 6)
- Ada Dyer – choir (1, 6)

Technical

- Brian "Danger Mouse" Burton – production (tracks 1–3, 7–11), additional production (5)
- Paul Epworth – production (1, 3, 5, 8), additional production (6)
- Flood – production (4)
- Declan Gaffney – production (3, 6–7), additional production (2, 11), engineering (2–11), additional engineering (1), mixing (1, 3, 5–6, 10)
- Ryan Tedder – production (1–2, 4–5)
- Matt Wiggins – engineering (1, 3, 5–6), additional engineering (8, 11), mixing (1, 4, 9)
- Kennie Takahashi – engineering (7), additional engineering (1–2, 6, 8, 10–11), mixing (11)
- Carl Gianville – engineering (9)
- Ben Baptie – additional engineering (6, 11), mixing (2, 7), additional mixing (6, 8)
- "Classy" Joe Visciano – engineering assistance (1, 3, 6, 10), mixing assistance (10)
- Adam Durbridge – engineering assistance (1–6, 8), mixing assistance (1, 8)
- Joseph Hartwell Jones – engineering assistance (3, 11), mixing assistance (4)
- Sean Oakley – engineering assistance (5), mixing assistance (5)
- Chris Heaney – engineering assistance (9)
- Tchad Blake – mixing (11)
- Tom Elmhirst – mixing (2, 8)
- Scott Sedillo – mastering
- Todd Malfalcone – engineering assistance (1), mixing assistance (11)
- Cecil Bartlett – engineering assistance (4)
- Drew Smith – engineering assistance (4)

== Charts ==
=== Weekly charts ===
| Chart (2014) | Peak position |
|---|---|
| Australian Albums (ARIA) | 7 |
| Austrian Albums (Ö3 Austria) | 2 |
| Belgian Albums (Ultratop Flanders) | 2 |
| Belgian Albums (Ultratop Wallonia) | 1 |
| Brazilian Albums (ABPD) | 7 |
| Canadian Albums (Billboard) | 5 |
| Croatian International Albums (HDU) | 1 |
| Czech Albums (ČNS IFPI) | 1 |
| Danish Albums (Hitlisten) | 3 |
| Dutch Albums (Album Top 100) | 1 |
| Finnish Albums (Suomen virallinen lista) | 10 |
| French Albums (SNEP) | 1 |
| German Albums (Offizielle Top 100) | 2 |
| Greek Albums (IFPI) | 2 |
| Hungarian Albums (MAHASZ) | 13 |
| Irish Albums (IRMA) | 2 |
| Italian Albums (FIMI) | 1 |
| Japanese Albums (Oricon) | 3 |
| New Zealand Albums (RMNZ) | 6 |
| Norwegian Albums (VG-lista) | 6 |
| Polish Albums (ZPAV) | 1 |
| Portuguese Albums (AFP) | 1 |
| Scottish Albums (Official Charts) | 4 |
| South Korean International Albums (Circle) | 13 |
| Spanish Albums (Promusicae) | 1 |
| Swedish Albums (Sverigetopplistan) | 2 |
| Swiss Albums (Schweizer Hitparade) | 3 |
| UK Albums (Official Charts) | 6 |
| US Billboard 200 | 9 |
| US Indie Store Album Sales (Billboard) | 1 |

=== Year-end charts ===
| Chart (2014) | Position |
|---|---|
| Belgian Albums (Ultratop Flanders) | 54 |
| Belgian Albums (Ultratop Wallonia) | 47 |
| Dutch Albums (Album Top 100) | 24 |
| French Albums (SNEP) | 30 |
| German Albums (Offizielle Top 100) | 63 |
| Italian Albums (FIMI) | 12 |
| Polish Albums (ZPAV) | 17 |
| Spanish Albums (PROMUSICAE) | 37 |
| Swiss Albums (Schweizer Hitparade) | 82 |
| US Alternative Albums (Billboard) | 47 |

| Chart (2015) | Position |
|---|---|
| Belgian Albums (Ultratop Flanders) | 92 |
| Belgian Albums (Ultratop Wallonia) | 100 |
| Dutch Albums (Album Top 100) | 77 |
| French Albums (SNEP) | 120 |
| Italian Albums (FIMI) | 50 |
| Spanish Albums (PROMUSICAE) | 73 |

== Certifications ==
| Region | Certification | Certified units/sales |
|---|---|---|
| Austria (IFPI Austria) | Platinum | 15,000^{*} |
| Brazil (Pro-Música Brasil) Deluxe edition | Gold | 20,000^{*} |
| Germany (BVMI) | Gold | 100,000^{‡} |
| Italy (FIMI) | 2× Platinum | 100,000^{*} |
| Netherlands (NVPI) | Platinum | 40,000^{^} |
| Poland (ZPAV) | 2× Platinum | 40,000^{*} |
| Portugal (AFP) | Gold | 7,500^{^} |
| Singapore (RIAS) | Platinum | 10,000^{*} |
| Spain (Promusicae) | Gold | 20,000^{^} |
| United Kingdom (BPI) | Silver | 60,000^{*} |
^{*} Sales figures based on certification alone.^{^} Shipments figures based on certification alone.^{‡} Sales+streaming figures based on certification alone.

== Release history ==
| Region | Date | Label | Format | Version |
|---|---|---|---|---|
| Various | 9 September 2014 | Interscope; Island | Digital download | Standard |
| Various | 13 October 2014 | Interscope; Island | CD | Standard; deluxe |
| Poland | 14 October 2014 | Universal Music Polska | CD | Standard; deluxe |
| United States | 14 October 2014 | Interscope | CD | Standard; deluxe |
