= Another Time, Another Place: Live at the Marquee London 1980 =

Live album by U2
- Released: 29 July 2015
- Recorded: 29 September 1980
- Venues: Marquee Club, London, England
- Genre: Rock
- Length: 45:38
- Label: Island / Interscope / Universal
- Producer: Declan Gaffney

U2 chronology
Songs of Innocence (2014)	Another Time, Another Place: Live at the Marquee London 1980 (2015)	Innocence + Experience: Live in Paris (2016)

Another Time, Another Place: Live at the Marquee London 1980 is a live album by Irish rock band U2, released in July 2015 exclusively to paid subscribers of the band's official website, U2.com. Recorded on 29 September 1980 at the Marquee Club in London, the album contains ten live performances from the band's early career, along with a spoken-word recording by lead singer Bono recalling the band's performances at the venue.

The album was issued as a limited-edition double 10-inch vinyl set, with the ten live tracks also made available as digital downloads. It was the first U2.com subscriber audio gift to be released on vinyl rather than compact disc.

== Background and release ==
The album was first announced on 25 November 2014 as the exclusive gift for U2.com's 2014–2015 subscription programme. At the time of the announcement, the title, artwork and track listing had not yet been revealed. The band described the forthcoming release as a recording from an early period of their career when they were performing in small venues across Ireland and the United Kingdom.

The release was intended as a companion to North Side Story, a publication previously distributed to U2.com subscribers documenting the band's early years in Dublin. The vinyl album was initially expected to be delivered during spring 2015, with selected tracks available for digital download in advance.

On 8 February 2015, the album's title and cover artwork were revealed. The track listing followed in April, when the expected shipping date was moved to July 2015. The first physical copies began arriving with subscribers on 29 July 2015, with distribution continuing throughout August.

The album was manufactured by GZ Vinyl in the Czech Republic and issued under the catalogue number U2COMV10. The two records were housed in a gatefold sleeve. The live performances occupy the first three sides of the release, while the fourth contains a spoken-word recollection by Bono.

On 24 August 2015, U2 officially promoted the completed release and made all ten live performances available for download to qualifying subscribers.

== Recording ==
The album was recorded on 29 September 1980 at the Marquee Club on Wardour Street in London. The performance was the fourth of four consecutive Monday-night concerts U2 played at the venue during September 1980, shortly before the release of their debut studio album, Boy.

The recording features early U2 material, including "I Will Follow", "The Electric Co.", "A Day Without Me", "Out of Control" and "Stories for Boys". Several songs from the performance subsequently appeared on Boy, which was released in October 1980. Other tracks, including "11 O'Clock Tick Tock", "Things to Make and Do" and "Boy-Girl", had previously been released as singles or B-sides.

The fourth side of the vinyl release features Bono recalling the band's four-week residency at the Marquee Club. He described the audience increasing over the course of the residency, from a partly filled venue on the first night to crowds queuing outside by the final performance.

== Track listing ==
All tracks are written by U2, except track 11, spoken word by Bono.

Double 10-inch vinyl
No.	Title	Length
1.	"The Ocean"	2:04
2.	"11 O'Clock Tick Tock"	4:51
3.	"I Will Follow"	3:49
4.	"An Cat Dubh / Into the Heart"	8:01
5.	"A Day Without Me"	3:08
6.	"The Electric Co."	4:33
7.	"Things to Make and Do"	2:25
8.	"Stories for Boys"	2:57
9.	"Boy-Girl"	3:26
10.	"Out of Control"	4:07
11.	"Another Time, Another Place (Bono Remembers the Marquee)" (Spoken word)	6:17
Total length:		45:38

The first three tracks appear on side one, tracks four through six on side two, tracks seven through ten on side three, and the spoken-word recording on side four. The digital download edition contains the ten live performances but omits the spoken-word recording.

== Personnel ==
Credits adapted from the album's liner notes, as documented by U2songs.

U2

- Bono – lead vocals; spoken word on track 11
- The Edge – guitar, backing vocals
- Adam Clayton – bass guitar
- Larry Mullen Jr. – drums, percussion

Technical

- Declan Gaffney – production, audio mixing
- Tim Painter – live recording
- Scott Sedillo – mastering at Bernie Grundman Mastering
- Brian Celler – project management
- Nadine King – album coordination
- Phil Sheehy – cover photography
- Shaughn McGrath – sleeve design
- Amp Visual – artwork design
- Martin Wroe – U2.com
- Sebastian Clayton – U2.com
- Django Bayless – U2.com
- Tim Honan – U2.com
