= Song for Someone =

Single by U2

from the album Songs of Innocence
- Released: 11 May 2015
- Recorded: 2010–2014 in California and New York
- Genre: Pop rock
- Length: 3:47
- Label: Island
- Composer: U2
- Lyricists: Bono and the Edge
- Producers: Ryan Tedder and Flood

U2 singles chronology
"Every Breaking Wave" (2014)	"Song for Someone" (2015)	"You're the Best Thing About Me" (2017)

"Song for Someone" is a song by Irish rock band U2. It is the fourth track from their thirteenth studio album, Songs of Innocence, and was released as its third single on 11 May 2015. It was produced by Ryan Tedder and Flood. Lyrically, "Song for Someone" is a love song dedicated by lead vocalist Bono to his wife Ali.

== Composition ==
Lead vocalist Bono described it as a love song dedicated to his wife, Ali. He told Rolling Stone, "Before I even knew what commitment was, I ended up as a young man in the arms of this young woman, in a world somewhat hostile to the concept of the childhood sweetheart and a first love." Rolling Stone compared the track to the band's single "Walk On", stating that the song "begins with gentle acoustic guitars before gradually building up to a "Walk On"-style crescendo."

The song "13 (There Is a Light)" on the group's subsequent album, Songs of Experience, features a reprise of the chorus from "Song for Someone".

== Music video ==
The music video for the song is a short film featuring Woody Harrelson and his daughter Zoe. A second video was released 27 August 2015 and premiered exclusively on Facebook for 24 hours. The clip quickly amassed close to a million views. The video was directed by Matt Mahurin, who had worked with the band on previous videos such as "Love Is Blindness" and "With Or Without You".

== Release and promotion ==
To promote the single, the band performed "Song for Someone" on The Graham Norton Show.

Chris Milk and his company Vrse produced a 360-degree virtual reality video for "Song for Someone" that was released in October 2015. Presented by Apple Music, the video was promoted in an Apple-branded bus, dubbed "The Experience Bus", that was located outside The O2 Arena prior to the band's London concerts on the Innocence + Experience Tour. The bus was equipped with Oculus Rift headsets and Beats Solos headphones for fans to use to view the video. It was also released through Vrse's mobile app. The video combines footage of U2 performing "Song for Someone" inside an empty Toronto venue with clips of fans worldwide also playing the song. Production on the project began two months before Apple Music's launch and saw filming take place in 11 countries.

The song has peaked at number 21 on the Billboard Adult Top 40 chart, number 13 on the Billboard Adult Alternative Songs chart, number 19 on the Adult Contemporary chart, and number 30 on the Billboard Hot Rock Songs Chart.

== Reception ==
Consequence of Sound cited "Song For Someone" as one of the "essential tracks" of Songs of Innocence.

== Live performances ==
The song was performed in every show during the Innocence + Experience Tour. During performances, the video screens displayed a recreation of Bono's childhood home, with his son portraying a childhood version of him trying to write a song. The song was also played on opening night of the Experience + Innocence Tour in Tulsa, in 2018.

== Personnel ==
Adapted from the liner notes.

U2

- Bono – lead vocals, keyboards
- The Edge – guitar, backing vocals, keyboards
- Adam Clayton – bass guitar
- Larry Mullen Jr. – drums, percussion

Additional performers

- Ryan Tedder – keyboards
- Flood – keyboards
- Declan Gaffney – keyboards

== Charts ==
=== Weekly charts ===
Chart (2015)	Peak position
Slovenia (SloTop50)	44
US Adult Alternative Airplay (Billboard)	13
US Adult Contemporary (Billboard)	19
US Adult Pop Airplay (Billboard)	21

== Certifications ==
Region	Certification	Certified units/sales
Brazil (Pro-Música Brasil)	2× Diamond	500,000^{‡}
Italy (FIMI)	Gold	25,000^{‡}
^{‡} Sales+streaming figures based on certification alone.
