= Invisible (U2 song) =

Single by U2
- Released: 2 February 2014
- Recorded: 2010–2013 in California and New York City
- Genre: Rock, electronic rock
- Length: 3:47 (single version); 4:42 (album version)
- Label: Island
- Composer: U2
- Lyricist: Bono
- Producer: Danger Mouse

U2 singles chronology
"Ordinary Love" (2013)	"Invisible" (2014)	"The Miracle (of Joey Ramone)" (2014)

Music video
- "Invisible" on YouTube

"Invisible" is a song by Irish rock band U2. Produced by Danger Mouse, it was released as a non-album single on 2 February 2014. The song was unveiled in a Super Bowl XLVIII television advertisement, launching a promotion that offered the song as a free digital download in the iTunes Store from 2–3 February. For each download of the track, Bank of America donated $1 to (RED), an organisation co-founded by lead vocalist Bono, to fight HIV/AIDS. Ultimately, $3.1 million was raised during the 36-hour promotion. Since 4 February, "Invisible" has been available as a paid download that continues to benefit (RED).

Written and recorded during the sessions for the band's 14th album Songs of Innocence, "Invisible" was the second non-album single to be issued leading up to the album's September 2014 release, following "Ordinary Love" in 2013. A longer version of "Invisible" was later included as a hidden track on certain deluxe editions of Songs of Innocence. Lyrically, "Invisible" was inspired by the group's early experiences of leaving home to play in London with the desire to be noticed by audiences, as well as Bono's tumultuous relationship with his father.

The song, described as an electronic-tinged rock anthem, was met with generally favourable reviews from music critics. The song has also charted in several countries, and topped the Billboard Adult Alternative Songs chart in the United States. A music video for the song was directed by Mark Romanek and released on 11 February 2014. U2 performed the song on the premiere episode of The Tonight Show Starring Jimmy Fallon on the observation deck of 30 Rockefeller Plaza in New York City.

== Writing and composition ==
"Invisible" is an electro-tinged rock anthem. It begins with a "brittle, electronic passage," reminiscent of Joy Division. Simple keyboard movements and chiming guitars lead to a "sky-scraping chorus," and lyrics "harnessing notions of self-respect, both the personal kind and the universal-struggle kind." The song was written during the recording sessions for their 13th studio album Songs of Innocence, for which they began working with producer Danger Mouse in 2011. Lead vocalist Bono said that during the process of writing new material, they "went back to why we wanted to be in a band in the first place. It opened up a whole valve for me writing and it was a dam burst of sorts. Punk rock and electronic [music] was when it started for us. We were listening to the Ramones and Kraftwerk and you can hear both of those things on 'Invisible'."

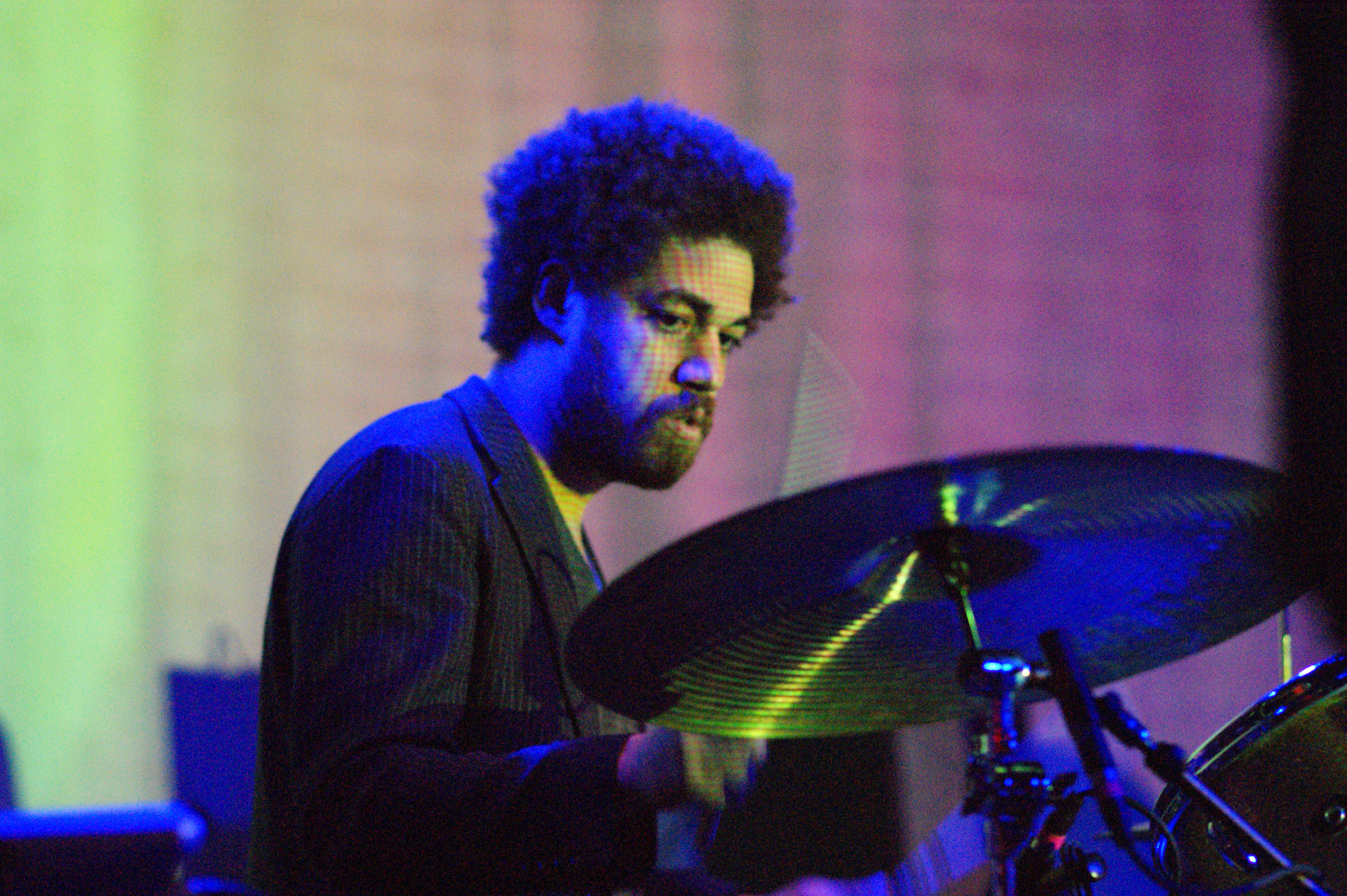
The song was produced by Danger Mouse, with whom U2 collaborated for their 13th album, Songs of Innocence.

Musically, guitarist the Edge said that "Invisible" began as demo he recorded in Los Angeles that was originally a "straight-rock song" that evoked the Ramones. After he presented it to the rest of the band in Dublin, they decided to strip the song back and try different arrangement ideas, none of which they were satisfied with. Ultimately, the group settled on an electronic-oriented arrangement while working with Danger Mouse. The changes to the song felt like "fresh territory" to Bono and enabled him "to own it as a singer".

According to Bono, his initial lyrics were set on a train arriving into London during his first visit to the city in 1979 at age 18, as he recalled "sleeping in Euston station, being broke". In a radio interview with BBC Radio 1's Zane Lowe, he explained that he was writing about "leaving home... with just enough rage to see it through... and then coming out into the punk rock explosion that was happening in the late '70s... really wild, extraordinary looking people and then feeling deeply sort of not extraordinary... And you feel invisible but you're screaming to be seen and you've got your band and this is your whole life... It's just that feeling of getting out of town." Bono later gave an alternate explanation for the song's lyrics, explaining that they were inspired by his relationship with his father. Bono said that taking a stage name and not being known to the world by his father's last name, Hewson, was hurtful to his father; this is reflected in lyrics such as "I finally found my real name" and "No, I won't be my father's son". Bono commented that the line "You don't see me but you will / I am not invisible" may have been an overcompensation on his part in expressing his feelings to his father. The line "There is no them / There's only us" was meant to represent the band's attempt to break down barriers separating them from their audience.

== Release and promotion ==
In November 2013, the band released its first new song in four years, "Ordinary Love", recorded for the biographical film Mandela: Long Walk to Freedom; the second song released during the period between studio albums was "Invisible". However, the latter was not the first official single to promote the album, but rather a "sort of a sneak preview – to remind people we exist," as Bono told USA Today.

On 16 January 2014, confusion was created when radio DJ Dave Fanning announced the "first-time play" of "Invisible" live on The Dave Fanning Show on RTÉ 2fm. Instead, a 2012 release titled "Bad Machine" from St Albans-based rock band Dark Stares aired twice. Fanning's close relationship with U2 and an over 33-year history of the band's single exclusives, caused many to believe the broadcast was legitimate and added further debate on U2 fan-forums. Several media outlets also reported on the situation, namely Hot Press and radio broadcaster Alan Cross. However, Fanning later hinted that he was partially behind the hoax, saying, "We did point out that it was a spoof," when interviewed by The Sunday Times.

On 2 February 2014, "Invisible" was unveiled in a Super Bowl XLVIII television advertisement and released as a free download in the iTunes Store for what was originally announced as a 24-hour period. As part of the promotion, (RED)–an organisation founded by Bono and Bobby Shriver–partnered with Bank of America to fight HIV/AIDS. For each download of the track, Bank of America donated $1 to (RED) and its recipient, The Global Fund to Fight AIDS, Tuberculosis and Malaria. According to the band's website, the period of time in which the song was available for free was eventually extended to 36 hours, and the total sum raised was $3,138,470. On 4 February 2014, the song was made available as a regular paid download, with all the proceeds also going to (RED).

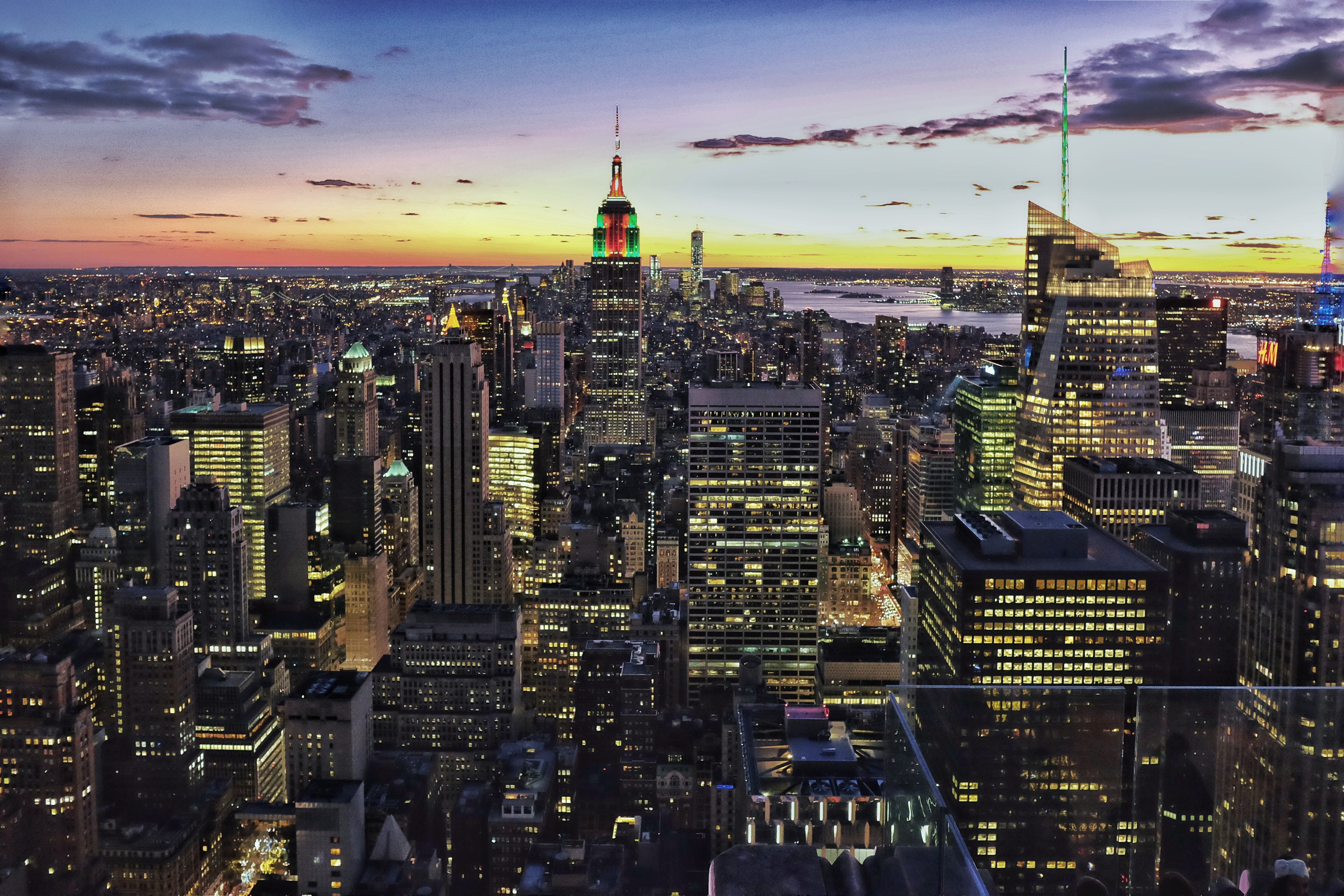
A view from the observation deck of 30 Rockefeller Plaza, where U2 performed the song on the debut episode of The Tonight Show Starring Jimmy Fallon

On 17 February 2014, the band appeared on the debut episode of The Tonight Show Starring Jimmy Fallon and performed "Invisible" on the observation deck of 30 Rockefeller Plaza, with the Manhattan skyline during sunset as a backdrop. The group were accompanied by the Rutgers University drumline.

An alternative, longer version of "Invisible" was eventually released as a hidden track on some deluxe editions of Songs of Innocence, which was released in October 2014. Doug Collette of All About Jazz commented that the song's "patently transparent lyrics set in the context of this package and the benefit of brief hindsight, make for a fitting conclusion of deliberate or accidental self-commentary."

== Critical reception ==
In a positive review of the song, Randall Roberts of Los Angeles Times called the track "a pleasant surprise and a fairly typical track by the world's biggest rock band," commenting that it "features the kind of grand, aspirational chorus that Bono and buds were born to birth and flies on the wings of a typically sticky guitar melody courtesy of the Edge," and that lyrically, the song conveys "some sort of grandly unified message that speaks truth to power without being too political about it," also typical for U2.

Spin magazine's Marc Hogan called the "founded in togetherness" song "a ringing stadium-rock anthem in All That You Can't Leave Behind mold," with Bono singing "like he's posing for a 21st-century Mount Rushmore." Michael Cragg of The Guardian wrote of the song, "There's a more textured, characterful feel to it all. By the final coda...you sort of feel happy to have them back."

== Chart performance ==
"Invisible" entered the Irish Singles Chart at number 31, and reached number 24 in its second week. It debuted on the UK Singles Chart at number 65. In the United States, the song debuted at number 28 on the Billboard Alternative Songs chart, with U2 reclaiming the record for the most Alternative Songs appearances in the chart's 25-year archives with 39 songs, passing Pearl Jam (38), Green Day and Red Hot Chili Peppers (both 30). As of March 2014, the single has sold 64,000 copies in the United States.

== Music video ==
A music video for "Invisible" was directed by Mark Romanek, and shot in black-and-white in a Santa Monica airport hangar in January 2014. It shows the band performing the song in front of a captive audience, against a massive screen with multiple video effects, with Bono singing to a circular hangdown microphone. Footage from the video was used in the 60-second Super Bowl commercial, which aired on 2 February 2014. The full-length video premiered on 11 February 2014.

== Track listing ==
- Digital download
1. "Invisible" ((RED) Edit Version) – 3:47

== Personnel ==
U2

- Bono – lead vocals
- The Edge – guitar, backing vocals, Yamaha CP-80
- Adam Clayton – bass guitar
- Larry Mullen Jr. – drums, percussion

Additional performers

- Danger Mouse – synthesisers, programming
- Declan Gaffney – synthesisers, programming

Technical

- Danger Mouse – production
- Tom Elmhirst – mixing
- Ben Baptie – mixing assistance
- Declan Gaffney – recording
- Kennie Takahashi – additional recording
- "Classy" Joe Visciano – recording assistance
- Scott Sedillo – mastering

== Charts and certifications ==
=== Weekly charts ===
Weekly chart performance for "Invisible"
Chart (2014)	Peak position
Australia (ARIA)	79
Austria (Ö3 Austria Top 40)	39
Belgium (Ultratop 50 Flanders)	43
Belgium (Ultratop 50 Wallonia)	9
Canada Hot 100 (Billboard)	44
Canada Rock (Billboard)	29
Denmark (Tracklisten)	28
France (SNEP)	11
Germany (GfK)	48
Hungary (Single Top 40)	3
Ireland (IRMA)	24
Italy (FIMI)	6
Italy Airplay (EarOne)	5
Japan Hot 100 (Billboard)	38
Netherlands (Single Top 100)	41
Netherlands (Tipparade)	8
Portugal Digital Songs (Billboard)	2
Spain (Promusicae)	5
Switzerland (Schweizer Hitparade)	22
UK Singles (Official Charts Company)	65
US Bubbling Under Hot 100 (Billboard)	8
US Hot Rock & Alternative Songs (Billboard)	15
US Rock & Alternative Airplay (Billboard)	12
US Adult Alternative Airplay (Billboard)	1
US Alternative Airplay (Billboard)	28
US Mainstream Rock (Billboard)	27

=== Year-end charts ===
Annual chart rankings for "Invisible"
Chart (2014)	Position
Italy (Musica e dischi)	92
US Adult Alternative Songs (Billboard)	24

=== Certifications ===
Region	Certification	Certified units/sales
Italy (FIMI)	Gold	15,000^{‡}
^{‡} Sales+streaming figures based on certification alone.

== See also ==
- Timeline of U2
