= Every Breaking Wave =

Single by U2

from the album Songs of Innocence
- Released: 9 December 2014
- Recorded: 2010–14 in California and New York
- Genre: Rock
- Length: 4:12 (album version); 4:28 (acoustic sessions); 4:36 (radio mix)
- Label: Island
- Composer(s): U2
- Lyricist(s): Bono and the Edge
- Producer(s): Danger Mouse and Ryan Tedder, with additional production from Declan Gaffney

U2 singles chronology
"The Miracle (Of Joey Ramone)" (2014)	"Every Breaking Wave" (2014)	"Song for Someone" (2015)

"Every Breaking Wave" is a song by Irish rock band U2. It is the second track from their thirteenth studio album, Songs of Innocence, and was released as its second single. It was produced by Danger Mouse and Ryan Tedder, with additional production from Declan Gaffney.

== Writing and recording ==
Lead vocalist Bono said that the band began recording "Every Breaking Wave" in Sydney, Australia, but "then it went down the drain for seven years, up the arse, as these things do." The song was originally intended to be included on U2's 2009 studio album No Line on the Horizon. In an article previewing the album several weeks before release, Rolling Stone called the song a "swelling soul-pop song, with bright synth sounds influenced by OMD". However, the track was ultimately left off the album at the advice of Coldplay frontman Chris Martin, who told the band that the song "deserves to be finished." Speaking of material the band were working on, Bono said the song was producer Jimmy Iovine's favorite. Bono mentioned tentative plans for the group to release a follow-up record, Songs of Ascent, comprising songs from No Line's recording sessions, and said that the first single was intended to be "Every Breaking Wave". However, the project was continually delayed, as U2 struggled to complete an album to their satisfaction and were limited by other commitments.

When the group resumed their U2 360° Tour in August 2010, they debuted "Every Breaking Wave" with a live performance, making it one of several unreleased tracks to be debuted. As the band continued recording for their next studio album, the song was altered; after Ryan Tedder was brought on as a co-producer in 2013, the song was one of the tracks that he changed most, as he introduced a new chorus melody and moved the old one to the song's bridge.

Bono described the song as being about the difficulty of "giv[ing] yourself completely to another person", with lyrical characters who are "addicted to sort of failure and rebirth". He referred to the chorus lines "Every dog on the street / Knows we're in love with defeat / Are we ready to be swept off our feet / And stop chasing every breaking wave" as a chance for the characters of two lovers to "make a break for it". A previous version of the song included the lines "After every peak, the trough / I can feel the energy drop / Will we ever know when to stop / With this chasing every breaking wave", which Bono said "has a certain despair that's powerful."

An acoustic version of the song, recorded in Malibu, California, was included on the deluxe version of the album. This version features the Edge on piano and an orchestra accompaniment written by David Richard Campbell.

== Music video ==
The song's official music video is a truncated, four-and-a-half-minute version of the 13-minute short film Every Breaking Wave, which was directed by Irish director Aoife McArdle. The film dramatizes the violence of The Troubles in Northern Ireland during the 1980s by depicting a teenage couple on opposing sides of the conflict. McArdle used the album and acoustic versions of "Every Breaking Wave" in the film, along with another track from Songs of Innocence, "The Troubles". The film premiered on 12 February 2015 before the music video was released on 23 February.

== Reception ==
Ben Patashnik of NME said that "Every Breaking Wave" is "characterised by restraint rather than bombast and is another obvious highlight, concerned with relaxing into calmness rather than killing yourself trying to take every opportunity out there. It's subtle and sensitive, and it shows that U2 are still capable of true wonder". Sal Cinquemani of Slant Magazine cited the Edge's "whining guitar strains" on the song as one example of his "melodies and atmospheric licks" being "the real star of the album". Kenneth Partridge of Billboard said the track is "strong enough to keep fans from messing with their iPhones" and suggested it could be paired with "I Still Haven't Found What I'm Looking For" for live performances. Evan Sawdey of PopMatters said the track was "perhaps the album's most successful pop moment". Jon Pareles of The New York Times said it was one of the album's "two most direct songs about romance, with sturdy melodies and straightforward buildups", describing it further as being "tinged with misgivings and ambivalences."

Carl Wilson of Spin said he was "less moved" by the track than others on the album, saying it sounded like "someone turned the 'U2' dial up to 11". Reviewing Songs of Innocence, Alexis Petridis of The Guardian said, "You might detect a certain whiff of desperation in the fact that parts of the album sound distinctly like Coldplay", citing the resemblance that the guitar line to "Every Breaking Wave" has to a melody from Coldplay's song "Paradise". Kitty Empire of The Observer echoed this sentiment, saying that the song "creates a little fold in the time-space continuum, by sounding like Coldplay sounding like U2". Dan Lucas of Under the Radar called the song one example of the band "self-plagiarising" themselves on the record, saying "the intro... is essentially a polished 'With or Without You'".

Rolling Stone ranked "Every Breaking Wave" as the third-best song of 2014, calling it a "stark, shimmering ballad" that stands as the "emotional centerpiece of Songs of Innocence". The magazine later ranked it the 49th-best song of the 2010s.

== Credits and personnel ==
U2

- Bono – vocals, dulcimer
- The Edge – guitar, keyboards, backing vocals
- Adam Clayton – bass guitar
- Larry Mullen, Jr. – drums, percussion

Additional performers

- Ryan Tedder – keyboards
- Brian Burton – keyboards
- Declan Gaffney – keyboards

Technical

- Production – Danger Mouse and Ryan Tedder
- Additional production – Declan Gaffney
- Engineering – Declan Gaffney
- Engineering assistance – Adam Durbridge
- Additional engineering – Kennie Takahashi
- Mixing – Tom Elmhirst and Ben Baptie

== Charts ==
Chart (2014–15)	Peak position
Belgium (Ultratip Bubbling Under Flanders)	7
Belgium (Ultratip Bubbling Under Wallonia)	18
France (SNEP)	93
Slovenia (SloTop50)	50
US Adult Alternative Songs (Billboard)	7
US Adult Contemporary (Billboard)	28
US Adult Pop Airplay (Billboard)	34
US Alternative Airplay (Billboard)	24
US Hot Rock & Alternative Songs (Billboard)	34
US Rock Airplay (Billboard)	23

== Certifications ==
Region	Certification	Certified units/sales
Brazil (Pro-Música Brasil)	2× Diamond	500,000^{‡}
Italy (FIMI)	Gold	25,000^{‡}
Netherlands (NVPI)	Platinum	30,000^{‡}
^{‡} Sales+streaming figures based on certification alone.
