= The Miracle (of Joey Ramone) =

2014 song by U2

Single by U2

from the album Songs of Innocence
- Released: 15 September 2014
- Recorded: 2010–2014
- Genre: Pop rock
- Length: 4:15
- Label: Island
- Composer: U2
- Lyricists: Bono and the Edge
- Producers: Danger Mouse, Paul Epworth, Ryan Tedder

U2 singles chronology
"Invisible" (2014)	"The Miracle (of Joey Ramone)" (2014)	"Every Breaking Wave" (2014)

Audio sample
- "The Miracle (of Joey Ramone)": file; help

"The Miracle (of Joey Ramone)" is a song by Irish rock band U2. It is the opening track from their thirteenth studio album, Songs of Innocence, and was released as its lead single. It was produced by Danger Mouse, Paul Epworth, and Ryan Tedder. It was first unveiled by the band during their performance at an Apple Inc. product launch event on 9 September 2014, coinciding with an announcement that Songs of Innocence would be released digitally to iTunes Store customers free of charge. The song's title refers to American musician Joey Ramone, lead singer of influential punk rock band the Ramones.

== Writing and recording ==
"The Miracle (of Joey Ramone)" originated from U2's recording sessions with Danger Mouse in 2010, initially consisting of a drum loop and acoustic guitar. With the input of producers Ryan Tedder and Paul Epworth, it evolved into a rockier song called "Siren", with one lyric comparing the music of the punk rock band Ramones to a siren song. The band settled on the final melody and lyrics with Epworth during the final two months of the album's recording sessions.

The song pays tribute to Joey Ramone, the lead singer of Ramones, who had a strong influence on Bono. During their teenage years, U2 snuck into a Ramones concert, and the experience of watching Joey perform made Bono feel less self-conscious about his own singing.

== Release ==
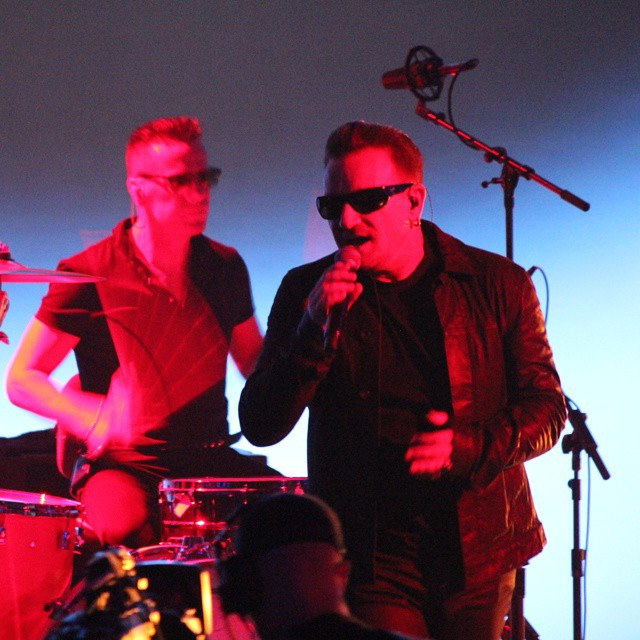
U2 performing "The Miracle" at 9 September 2014 Apple Inc. product launch

In the days leading to an Apple Inc. product launch event on 9 September 2014 in Cupertino, California, reports began to circulate that U2 would be involved, which were promptly denied by a spokesperson for the band. Nonetheless, towards the end of the event U2 appeared and performed a new song titled "The Miracle (of Joey Ramone)", the lead single from their thirteenth studio album Songs of Innocence, with Apple CEO Tim Cook announcing that the album would be released digitally in its entirety at no cost to all iTunes Store customers. The presentation concluded with the unveiling of an Apple advertisement featuring U2 performing the song.

"The Miracle (of Joey Ramone)" was subsequently released to United States adult album alternative (triple A) radio stations on 15 September 2014 and modern rock stations on 16 September. Ahead of its official radio release, it had already been added to the playlists of several stations and subsequently debuted at numbers 19 and 38 on the Billboard Adult Alternative Songs and Rock Airplay charts, respectively.

Former Ramones drummer Marky Ramone praised the song but was perplexed that U2 did not mention Joey Ramone's name anywhere in the lyrics. Regardless, he added that Joey would be very grateful for the tribute.

== Music video ==
The official music video for the song was launched on 14 October 2014, first in the iTunes store and later on the band's official website.

== Personnel ==
Adapted from the liner notes.

U2

- Bono – lead vocals, keyboards, additional guitar
- The Edge – guitar, backing vocals, keyboards
- Adam Clayton – bass guitar
- Larry Mullen Jr. – drums, percussion

Additional performers

- Brian "Danger Mouse" Burton – keyboards
- Ryan Tedder – keyboards, programming, acoustic guitar
- Paul Epworth – keyboards, programming, additional percussion
- Declan Gaffney – acoustic guitar
- Greg Clark – choir
- Carlos Ricketts – choir
- Tabitha Fair – choir
- Kim Hill – choir
- Quiona McCollum – choir
- Nicki Richards – choir
- Everett Bradley – choir
- Bobby Harden – choir
- Ada Dyer – choir

== Charts ==
=== Weekly charts ===
Chart (2014)	Peak position
Belgium (Ultratip Bubbling Under Flanders)	13
Belgium (Ultratip Bubbling Under Wallonia)	6
Canada Rock (Billboard)	4
Italy (FIMI)	47
Italy Airplay (EarOne)	3
Netherlands (Dutch Top 40)	33
US Hot Rock & Alternative Songs (Billboard)	42
US Rock & Alternative Airplay (Billboard)	12
US Adult Alternative Airplay (Billboard)	1
US Alternative Airplay (Billboard)	22

=== Year-end charts ===
Chart (2014)	Position
Japan Adult Contemporary (Billboard)	77
US Adult Alternative Songs (Billboard)	36

== Certifications ==
Region	Certification	Certified units/sales
Brazil (Pro-Música Brasil)	2× Diamond	500,000^{‡}
Netherlands (NVPI)	Platinum	30,000^{‡}
^{‡} Sales+streaming figures based on certification alone.
