= Ordinary Love (U2 song) =

- Cover art designed by Oliver Jeffers

Single by U2

from the album Mandela: Long Walk to Freedom (Original Motion Picture Soundtrack)
- B-side: "Breathe" (Mandela version)
- Released: 29 November 2013
- Studio: Electric Lady Studios (New York)
- Genre: Rock
- Length: 3:39 (single version); 3:47 (Extraordinary Mix)
- Label: Interscope
- Composers: U2; Brian Burton
- Lyricist: Bono
- Producers: Danger Mouse; Declan Gaffney (add.)

U2 singles chronology
""I Will Follow" (live from Glastonbury)" (2011)	"Ordinary Love" (2013)	"Invisible" (2014)

Music video
- "Ordinary Love" lyric video on YouTube

"Ordinary Love" is a song by Irish rock band U2. It was written to honour Nelson Mandela and is included in the biography film Mandela: Long Walk to Freedom. The song received a limited 10-inch vinyl release on Record Store Day on 29 November 2013, less than a week before Mandela died.

"Ordinary Love" peaked at number one on the Top Digital Download chart in Italy, where it was certified platinum by the Federation of the Italian Music Industry. U2 won the 2014 Golden Globe Award for Best Original Song, and in January 2014 the song was nominated for the Academy Award for Best Original Song, but it lost to "Let It Go" from Frozen.

An alternate version of the song, titled the "Extraordinary Mix", was included on deluxe edition of the band's 2017 studio album, Songs of Experience.

== Writing and recording ==
U2 had been friends with Nelson Mandela for several years, having played concerts in South Africa. When movie producer Harvey Weinstein invited the band to write a song for the soundtrack of the Mandela biography film Mandela: Long Walk to Freedom, they responded with a quick "yes" according to Weinstein. After seeing early cuts of the film, the group were inspired to write a song reflecting upon Mandela. The song was mixed at Electric Lady Studios, New York City.

== Release and reception ==
It was revealed on 17 October 2013, the band had written a song specifically for the film Mandela: Long Walk to Freedom entitled "Ordinary Love", after receiving an invitation from movie producer Harvey Weinstein. Subscribers of the band's official website were able to hear it first on the same day. It was reported that the song was to get a full preview on U2.com on 30 October but instead a news bulletin was released stating the song was to be released on a 10-inch vinyl. On 21 November 2013, U2 made the previously announced lyric video available for paying subscribers via their official website. The video was directed by Mac Premo and Oliver Jeffers. On 30 November, the song was made available as a free download on the band's website to paid subscribers.

"Ordinary Love" was released on 29 November 2013 as part of the Record Store Day's "Back to Black Friday". As a limited release, only 10,000 10" vinyl copies were made. During the recording of No Line on the Horizon, U2 worked on two sets of lyrics for "Breathe". The first version was about Nelson Mandela, and the second was "more surreal and personal". Whereas the second version was included on No Line on the Horizon, they decided to include the first version about Mandela on the vinyl as a B-side for "Ordinary Love", entitling it "Breathe (Mandela version)". Weinstein has said that he believes U2 have done a "brilliant job honouring the man". Rolling Stone said, "'Ordinary Love' is about the seeds of dreams, and U2 play it perfectly: down-to-earth, while looking up." As of March 2014, the single has sold 115,000 copies in the United States.

U2 posted a new mix of the song, "Ordinary Love (Paul Epworth mix)", on their official SoundCloud account on 14 December 2013.

The song was performed by U2 with in-house band The Roots on The Tonight Show Starring Jimmy Fallon on 17 February 2014.

== Awards ==
Award	Category	Result
86th Academy Awards	Best Original Song	Nominated
71st Golden Globe Awards	Best Original Song	Won
19th Critics' Choice Awards	Best Song	Nominated
2013 Denver Film Critics Society Awards	Best Original Song	Nominated
Broadcast Film Critics Association	Best Original Song	Nominated

== Cover art ==
The cover art for the "Ordinary Love" single features a "striking painting of Nelson Mandela" by Oliver Jeffers.

== Personnel ==
U2

- Bono – lead vocals
- The Edge – guitar, backing vocals, piano
- Adam Clayton – bass guitar
- Larry Mullen Jr. – drums, percussion, backing vocals

Additional performers

- Danger Mouse – additional synthesisers and piano
- Declan Gaffney – additional synthesisers and piano
- Barry Gorey – Wurlitzer, synthesiser
- Angel Deradoorian – additional backing vocals

Technical

- Danger Mouse – production, mixing
- Declan Gaffney – additional production, recording
- Tom Elhmhirst – mixing
- Ben Baptie – mixing assistance, additional recording
- "Classy" Joe Visciano – recording assistance
- Grant Ransom – additional recording
- Barry Gorey – additional recording
- Scott Sedillo – mastering
- Bernie Grundman – mastering

== Chart performance ==
=== Weekly charts ===
Weekly chart performance for "Ordinary Love"
Chart (2013–14)	Peak position
Australia (ARIA)	88
Austria (Ö3 Austria Top 40)	29
Belgium (Ultratop 50 Flanders)	14
Belgium (Ultratop 50 Wallonia)	10
Canada Hot 100 (Billboard)	29
Czech Republic Airplay (ČNS IFPI)	90
Denmark (Tracklisten)	23
France (SNEP)	27
Germany (GfK)	39
Hungary (Rádiós Top 40)	17
Hungary (Single Top 40)	4
Ireland (IRMA)	13
Israel International Airplay (Media Forest)	4
Italy (FIMI)	1
Italy Airplay (EarOne)	1
Luxembourg Digital Songs (Billboard)	2
Netherlands (Dutch Top 40)	7
Netherlands (Single Top 100)	6
Poland (Polish Airplay Top 100)	5
Portugal Digital Songs (Billboard)	1
Slovenia (SloTop50)	20
Spain (PROMUSICAE)	20
Switzerland (Schweizer Hitparade)	11
UK Singles (Official Charts Company)	82
US Billboard Hot 100	84
US Adult Alternative Airplay (Billboard)	7
US Adult Pop Airplay (Billboard)	35
US Hot Rock & Alternative Songs (Billboard)	13

=== Year-end charts ===
Annual chart rankings for "Ordinary Love"
Chart (2013)	Position
Netherlands (Dutch Top 40)	117

Chart (2014)	Position
Belgium (Ultratop Wallonia)	66
France (SNEP)	81
Hungary (Rádiós Top 40)	87
Hungary (Single Top 40)	34
Italy (FIMI)	71
Italy Airplay (EarOne)	60
Netherlands (Dutch Top 40)	48
Netherlands (Single Top 100)	100
Poland (ZPAV)	50
US Adult Alternative Songs (Billboard)	49
US Hot Rock Songs (Billboard)	91

== Certifications ==
Region	Certification	Certified units/sales
Brazil (Pro-Música Brasil)	Gold	30,000^{‡}
Italy (FIMI)	Platinum	30,000^{‡}
Netherlands (NVPI)	2× Platinum	40,000^{‡}
^{‡} Sales+streaming figures based on certification alone.

== See also ==
- Timeline of U2
