= Exit (U2 song) =

Song by U2

from the album The Joshua Tree
- Released: 9 March 1987
- Recorded: November 1986
- Studio: Windmill Lane (Dublin)
- Genre: Rock
- Length: 4:13
- Label: Island
- Composer: U2
- Lyricist: Bono
- Producers: Daniel Lanois; Brian Eno

Audio sample
- file; help

"Exit" is a song by rock band U2. It is the tenth track on their 1987 album The Joshua Tree. "Exit" was developed from a lengthy jam that was recorded in a single take and edited down to a shorter arrangement. The lyrics, which portray the mind of a serial killer, were inspired by lead singer Bono's reading of Norman Mailer's 1979 novel The Executioner's Song, and other related works.

In his trial for the murder of Rebecca Schaeffer in 1989, Robert John Bardo used "Exit" as part of his defence, claiming that the song had influenced his actions.

"Exit" was performed during U2's Joshua Tree Tour in 1987 and returned to their live set in 2017 as part of their 30th anniversary tour for The Joshua Tree. Live performances of "Exit" are depicted in the 1988 film Rattle and Hum as well as the 2007 video and live album Live from Paris.

== Writing and recording ==
"If you try [to] dissect a jam and then reconstruct a jam, you can get to the point where you've killed it. But if you can capture the moment and edit it into some kind of a shape where people overlook any timing or tuning discrepancies, then you don't lose the inspiration and momentum and you kind of capture the pearl."

— Adam Clayton

"Exit" was created on the final day of recording for The Joshua Tree. It developed from a lengthy jam that the band recorded in a single take. Producer Daniel Lanois said, "it was a long jam, and there was just this one section of it that had some kind of magic to it, and we just decided to turn it into something." Producer Brian Eno edited the jam down to the end length. Guitarist the Edge said, "it started off as an exercise in playing together with a kind of mood and a place in mind. And it really, for me, it brought me there, it really did succeed as an experiment." Lanois said: "There's something that happens when U2 bash it out in the band room... and sometimes things get out of control, sonically, in a good way. Out of control in the sense that you don't know what it is anymore, it just takes on a life of its own, and it makes people do things."

One day, during the album sessions, the Edge was looking to record a guitar part, but due to a miscommunication with the road crew, most of his equipment was removed from his house and put into storage. The only gear remaining was a Roland Jazz Chorus guitar amplifier and a Bond Electraglide guitar in a closet that had been given to the Edge as a promotional item; Lanois said that the guitar "was considered to be just a piece of junk". After the Edge and Eno began playing with the instrument, they were impressed by its sound and subsequently added it to "Exit". Lanois said, "it's a very, very dirty guitar sound like the sound of a machine that's alive, grunting and grinding."

The lyrics were inspired by Norman Mailer's 1979 novel The Executioner's Song, written about serial killer Gary Gilmore, and by Truman Capote's 1966 novel In Cold Blood; "Executioner's Song" was the track's working title. Lead singer Bono had read both novels and wanted to try to write "a story in the mind of a killer". Further reading of Flannery O'Connor and Raymond Carver inspired him to try to understand "the ordinary stock first and then the outsiders, the driftwood – those on the fringes of the promised land, cut off from the American dream." Bono described the lyrics as "just a short story really, except I left out a few of the verses because I liked it as a sketch. It's just about a guy who gets an idea into his head. He picks it up off a preacher on the radio or something and goes out...". He noted that, although 30 songs were in contention for inclusion on the album, he "wanted a song with that sense of violence in it, especially before 'Mothers of the Disappeared'."

"Exit" is featured as the penultimate song on The Joshua Tree album, which was released on 9 March 1987. Although the song begins with Adam Clayton's bassline, some CD releases of the album mistakenly feature the coda from the previous track, "One Tree Hill", at the beginning of "Exit".

== Composition and theme ==
"'Exit' – I don't even know what the act is in that song. Some see it as a murder, others suicide – and I don't mind. But the rhythm of the words is nearly as important in conveying the state of mind."

— Bono

"Exit" runs for 4:13. It is played in common time at a tempo of 120 beats per minute. It is recorded in the key of E minor.

"Exit" portrays the mind of a psychotic killer. Hot Press editor Niall Stokes stated the song "trawls the area occupied by either or both [Gilmore and Manson], getting inside the head of a protagonist who's careening into psychosis." He added that the point of "Exit" was "to convey the state of mind of someone driven, by whatever powerful urges, to the very brink of desperation." Stokes felt that "the undercurrent of religious imagery" in the song was a response to "the fanaticism implicit in faith", and that the song allowed U2 to "[purge their] own demons, their own anger and fury at the vicissitudes fate had thrust upon them. Another Hot Press contributor, Bill Graham, said "Exit" allowed U2 to "finally confess their gradual recognition of the Anti-Christ in everybody."

Bassist Adam Clayton said that the line "He saw the hands that build could also pull down" was a jab at the US government's conflicting roles in international relations. Two songs from The Joshua Tree, "Bullet the Blue Sky" and "Mothers of the Disappeared", focused on the foreign policy of the United States. In describing "Exit", Bono said "It is all very well to address America and the violence that is an aggressive foreign policy but to really understand that you have to get under the skin of your own darkness, the violence we all contain within us. Violence is something I have quite a bit about. I have a side of me which, in a corner, can be very violent. It's the least attractive thing in anyone and I wanted to own up to that."

Don McLeese of the Chicago Sun-Times believed "Exit" "[suggests] the evil that can result from moral self-righteousness." Music journalist Bill Graham wrote "For the first time, [Bono] was owning up to the dangers of the dualism implicit in Christianity", comparing the song's spiritual and musical tone to that of the Virgin Prunes. David Werther, a faculty associate in Philosophy at the University of Wisconsin–Madison, compared "Exit" with U2's 1991 song "Until the End of the World" in an examination of the role music can play in catharsis. He noted that both were powerful songs, but that while "Until the End of the World" allowed the possibility of purification, which he described as the cleansing of the soul "through pity and fear", by placing the listener in the position of Judas Iscariot, "Exit" was an example of purgation, a freeing from excess pity and fear. Werther noted "'Exit' evokes feelings of fear, fear of losing control, giving into one's dark side, perhaps even taking one's life", contrasting it to the "waves of regret" experienced by Judas.

== Reception ==
"Exit" received mixed to positive reception from critics. Colin Hogg of The New Zealand Herald described the song as a "decidedly scary ... guitar-driven barrage". Divina Infusino of The San Diego Union-Tribune described it as "blistering". Tony Perry of The Patriot-News felt it was one of the low points of the album, stating "'Exit' ... crescendoes into little more than noise", a sentiment echoed by Lennox Samuels of The Dallas Morning News who called it "a dull piece". Writing for the Orange County Registrar, Jim Washburn and Noel Davis called it "a journey through a killer's mind, made harrowing not so much by Hewson's creepy-religio lyrics as by the band's [...] overdriven backing, which practically boils right out of the pot." Thom Duffy of the Orlando Sentinel labelled the song's atmosphere "eerie".

Richard Harrington of The Washington Post called it "metaphorically ambivalent". Barbara Jaeger of The Bergen Record called Clayton's bassline "ominous". Stokes described it as "the antithesis of [U2's] bright, ringing, optimistic, inspirational selves, it was dirty, loud, discordant, repetitive, noisy, black. If the intention was to invoke a sense of evil abroad, then it was effective". Graham said "'Exit' should have exploded the myth of U2 as the nice guys of rock. Never had they shown such a vicious streak or produced such a withering track ... . Far more than even 'Bullet the Blue Sky', [the Edge's] playing is scratching at the prison bars of polished good taste", describing it as the wild card of the album. Author John Luerssen contrasted it to the rest of the band's catalogue, saying "Unlike most of the songs U2 had written up to this point, 'Exit' lacked any optimism." Hot Press contributor Colm O'Hare felt that the claims by Bardo evoked memories of Charles Manson's use of "Helter Skelter", and contained "even more sinister shades" of the death of John Lennon. In Rolling Stone, Steve Pond argued it was "awkward enough to remind you that not even Patti Smith could regularly pull off this sort of thing."

Although "Exit" was not released as a single, it charted in the Netherlands, peaking at number 46 after two weeks.

== Live performances ==
"Sometimes Bono would come offstage in the break and would not have left character. The darkness would still be there with him. Sometimes it was hard for him to shake it off and get into playing the next songs. That darkness has a certain kind of adrenaline."

— The Edge

U2 debuted "Exit" on 8 March 1987 for a broadcast of The Old Grey Whistle Test. Bono introduced it as "a song about a religious man, a fanatic, who gets into his head the idea he calls 'the hands of love'." It was next performed on 2 April 1987 in Tempe, Arizona, during the first concert of The Joshua Tree Tour. Clayton noted that the manner in which they created the song inadvertently caused a problem for U2, saying "when you're in a touring situation you have to learn numbers that were never actually written so much as spontaneously created." "Exit" was played at all 109 concerts on the tour, and was frequently followed by a snippet of the Them song "Gloria", written by Van Morrison. Following the conclusion of the Joshua Tree Tour, U2 performed "Exit" on only one more occasion (until the Joshua Tree Tour 2017): 14 October 1989 in Melbourne, Australia, on the Lovetown Tour, almost two years after its previous performance. In 2007, U2's manager Paul McGuinness said that the song had been "slightly tainted" after the trial of Robert John Bardo, speculating that it had fallen out of favour with the band following the incident.

In 2006, Bono stated "When things aren't going right and I'm feeling like we're not communicating, I go through terrible things on stage." He likened his emotions on those occasions to "a big blackness", and found that performing the song helped him to purge them from his mind on some occasions. Several scenes in the 1988 film Rattle and Hum depict Bono with his arm in a sling, a result of his falling and dislocating his shoulder during a performance of "Exit" on 20 September 1987 in Washington, D.C. The concert was being filmed for the movie, and the Edge stated that "the show was not going well". Bono fell while running across the stage "in an attempt to try [to] get something going". Recalling the incident, Bono said "['Exit'] had taken me to some ugly place... but it was rage that caused it. That was when I realized rage is an expensive thing for your general well-being." On another occasion he said "I just want to take a bath after we do that. I just want to wash it off my skin." Graham wrote that "performances of 'Exit' would grow ever more fraught and purgative."

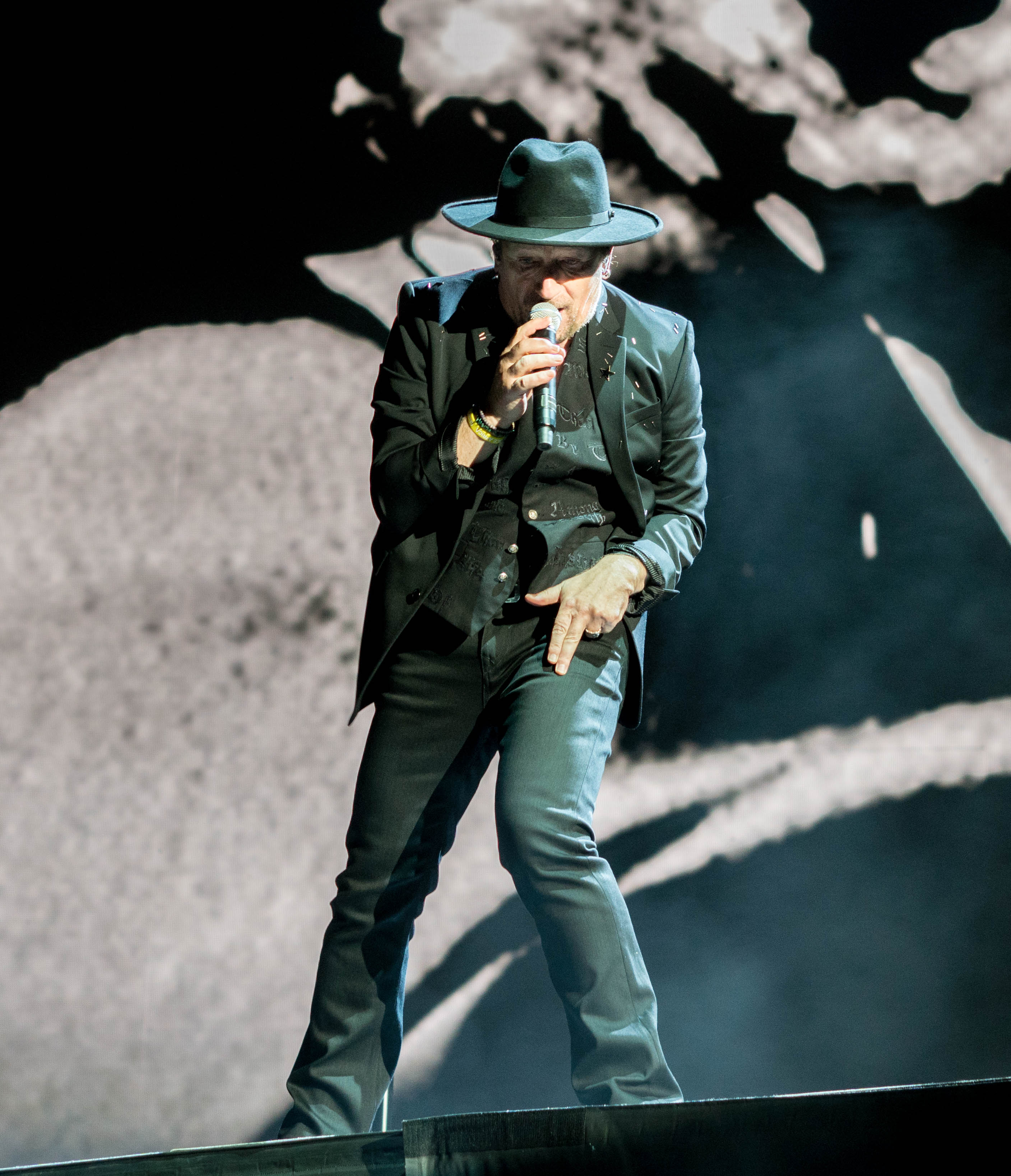
Bono portraying a character called the "Shadow Man" during a performance of "Exit" on the Joshua Tree Tour 2017

David Zimmerman of USA Today believed the live performance of "Exit" helped to showcase Mullen's drumming skills, which he described as "more assertive than ever". Don McLeese of the Chicago Sun-Times described the live rendition as "harder, more aggressive and more explosive than much of the band's earlier music." Jon Bream of the Star Tribune said "it galvanized the crowd in much the same way that U2 had in its legendary performances at Live Aid in 1985", believing that it helped to focus the band's energy.

A live performance of "Exit", recorded on 8 November 1987 in Denver, Colorado, appears as the fourth song in the 1988 film Rattle and Hum. Another live performance of the song, played on 4 July 1987 at the Hippodrome de Vincennes in Paris, was broadcast live on television. It was later released on the video and live album Live from Paris in 2007.

The song returned to the band's live set for the Joshua Tree Tour 2017, on which the band performed the album in its entirety for its 30th anniversary. For the tour, prior to performances of "Exit", a clip from the 1950s Western TV series Trackdown was shown; in the clip, a con man named Trump visits a town and promises to build a wall around them to ensure their safety. The band were pleased when Bono discovered it, as they wanted to make a reference to US President Donald Trump during the show without belabouring their point. The clip was followed by an image of hands tattooed "LOVE" and "HATE", inspired by the fanatic preacher/killer character in the film The Night of the Hunter. During the performance of "Exit", Bono wore a black suit and preacher hat and adopted the persona of the "Shadow Man". Taking influence from author Flannery O'Connor, whose works originally inspired the writing of the song, Bono used the Shadow Man to recite lines from O'Connor's novel Wise Blood and the "Eeny, meeny, miny, moe" rhyme.

== Trial of Robert John Bardo ==
Robert John Bardo, an American from Tucson, Arizona, became obsessed with actress Rebecca Schaeffer in 1986 after sending her a letter that same year. After witnessing her in a love scene in the 1989 film Scenes from the Class Struggle in Beverly Hills, Bardo stated that the film "ruined this innocent image of her." He paid a private investigator to find out her home address and began to stalk her, and on 18 July 1989, he travelled to Schaeffer's home and murdered her.

Park Elliott Dietz, a renowned forensic psychiatrist who had worked on the case of John Hinckley Jr. following his assassination attempt on President Ronald Reagan, was assigned to work with Bardo. He told the court that Bardo claimed "Exit" had influenced his actions. According to the Associated Press, when the song was played in court "Bardo, who had sat motionless through the trial, sprang to life... He grinned, bobbed to the music, pounded his knee like a drum and mouthed the lyrics." Bardo was convicted of first-degree murder.

Bono said he did not feel responsible that a U2 song was used in a murder defence, but stated "I still feel that you have to go down those streets in your music. If that's where the subject is taking you, you have to follow. At least in the imagination. I'm not sure I want to get down there to live. I'll take a walk occasionally, and have a drink with the Devil, but I'm not moving in with him." The Edge said that the song's defence in the trial was "very heavy", stating "Should any artist hold back from putting out something because he's afraid of what somebody else might do as a result of his work? I would hate to see censorship come in, whether from the government or, from my point of view, personal."

== Credits and personnel ==
U2

- Bono – lead vocals, guitar
- The Edge – guitar
- Adam Clayton – bass guitar
- Larry Mullen Jr. – drums

Additional musicians

- Brian Eno – keyboards

Technical

- Brian Eno – mixing
- Flood – recording
