= One Tree Hill (song) =

1988 single by U2

Single by U2

from the album The Joshua Tree
- B-side: "Bullet the Blue Sky"; "Running to Stand Still"
- Released: 7 March 1988
- Recorded: 1986
- Studio: Windmill Lane (Dublin)
- Genre: Rock
- Length: 5:23
- Label: Island; Festival
- Composer: U2
- Lyricist: Bono
- Producers: Daniel Lanois; Brian Eno

U2 singles chronology
"In God's Country" (1987)	"One Tree Hill" (1988)	"Desire" (1988)

"One Tree Hill" is a song by Irish rock band U2 and the ninth track on their 1987 album The Joshua Tree. In March 1988, it was released as the fourth single from the album in New Zealand and Australia, while "In God's Country" was released as the fourth single in North America. "One Tree Hill" charted at number one on the New Zealand Singles Chart and was the country's second-most-successful hit of 1988.

The track was written in memory of Greg Carroll, a New Zealander the band first met in Auckland during the Unforgettable Fire Tour in 1984. He became very close friends with lead singer Bono and later served as a roadie for the group. Carroll was killed in July 1986 in a motorcycle accident in Dublin. After Carroll's tangi (funeral) in New Zealand, Bono wrote the lyrics to "One Tree Hill" in his memory. The lyrics reflect Bono's thoughts at the tangi and during his first night in New Zealand when Carroll took him up Auckland's One Tree Hill. They also pay homage to Chilean singer-songwriter and activist Víctor Jara. Musically, the song was developed in a jam session with producer Brian Eno. The vocals were recorded in a single take, as Bono felt incapable of singing them a second time.

"One Tree Hill" was received favourably by critics, who variously described it as "a soft, haunting benediction", "a remarkable musical centrepiece", and a celebration of life. U2 delayed performing the song on the Joshua Tree Tour in 1987 because of Bono's fears over his emotional state. After its live debut on the tour's third leg and an enthusiastic reaction from audiences, the song was played occasionally for the rest of the tour and semi-regularly during the Lovetown Tour of 1989–1990. It has appeared only sporadically since then, and most renditions were performed in New Zealand. Performances in November 2010 on the U2 360° Tour were dedicated to the miners who died in the Pike River Mine disaster. During the Joshua Tree Tours 2017 and 2019 to commemorate the 30th anniversary of the album, "One Tree Hill" was performed at each show.

== Inspiration, writing, and recording ==
"They took me up to the top of a place called One Tree Hill, where a single tree stands at the top of the mount, like some stark Japanese painting, and we looked around at this city that's made by craters of volcanoes. I remember it so vividly, I think, because it meant something to me about my own freedom."

— Bono

U2 first visited Australia and New Zealand in 1984 to open The Unforgettable Fire Tour. After a 24-hour flight into Auckland, lead singer Bono was unable to adjust to the time difference between New Zealand and Europe. He left his hotel room during the night and met some people who showed him around the city. Greg Carroll was part of that group: he had met U2's production manager Steve Iredale and been offered a job helping the band for their upcoming concert on account of Greg's experience with local rock bands. They ended up taking Bono up One Tree Hill (Maungakiekie), one of the highest – and more spiritually significant to Māori people – of Auckland's largest volcanoes. Greg worked as a stage hand gently stopping people getting on stage, and was described as "this very helpful fellah running around the place". U2's manager Paul McGuinness thought Carroll was so helpful that he should accompany the band for the remainder of the tour. The group helped him obtain a passport, and he subsequently joined them on the road in Australia and the United States as their assistant. He became very close friends with Bono and his wife Ali Hewson, and following the conclusion of the tour, he worked for U2 in Dublin.

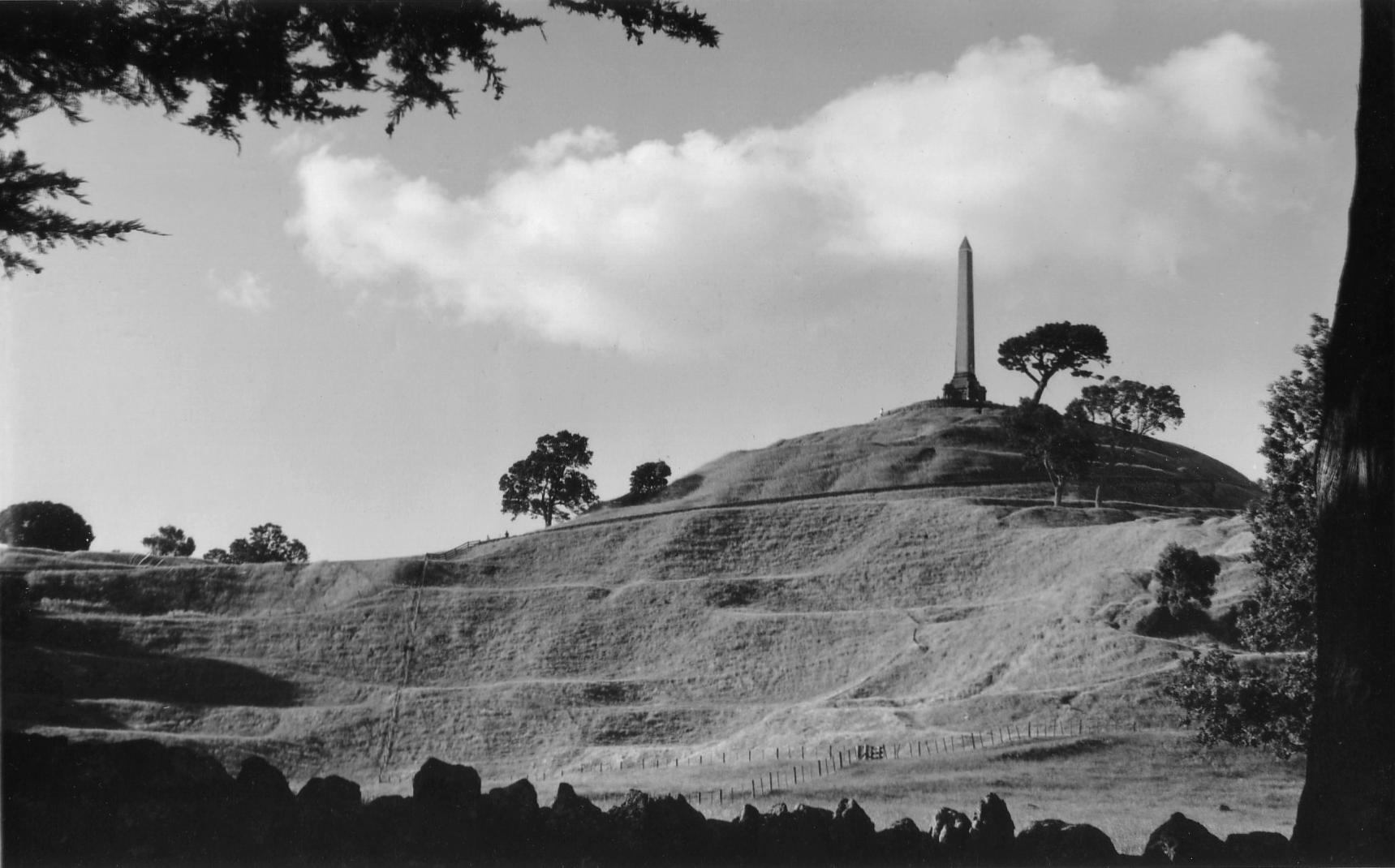
One Tree Hill pictured in 1996. The tree was later removed by authorities in 2000, six years after being chainsawed by a Māori activist.

On 3 July 1986, just before the start of the recording sessions for The Joshua Tree, Carroll was killed in a motorcycle accident while on a courier run. A car had pulled in front of him, and unable to stop in the rain, Carroll struck the side of the car and was killed instantly. The event shocked the entire band; drummer Larry Mullen Jr. said, "his death really rocked us – it was the first time anyone in our working circle had been killed." Guitarist the Edge said, "Greg was like a member of the family, but the fact that he had come under our wing and had travelled so far from home to be in Dublin to work with us made it all the more difficult to deal with." Bassist Adam Clayton described it as "a very sobering moment", saying, "it inspired the awareness that there are more important things than rock 'n' roll. That your family, your friends and indeed the other members of the band – you don't know how much time you've got left with them." Bono said, "it was a devastating blow. He was doing me a favour. He was taking my bike home." He later commented, "it brought gravitas to the recording of The Joshua Tree. We had to fill the hole in our heart with something very, very large indeed, we loved him so much." Accompanied by Bono, Ali, Mullen, and other members of the U2 organisation, Carroll's body was flown back to New Zealand and buried in the traditional Māori manner at Kai-iwi Marae near Whanganui, Carroll's hometown. Bono sang "Let It Be" and "Knockin' on Heaven's Door" for him at the funeral.

Shortly after returning to Dublin, Bono wrote lyrics for a song about the funeral that he titled "One Tree Hill" after the hill he remembered from his visit to Auckland in 1984. The music was developed early in the recording sessions for The Joshua Tree. The Edge said, "We were jamming with Brian [Eno]. He was playing keyboards ... we just got this groove going, and this part began to come through. It's almost highlife, although it's not African at all ... the sound was for me at that time a very elaborate one. I would never have dreamt of using a sound like that before then, but it just felt right, and I went with it." Bono recorded his vocals in a single take, as he felt that he could not sing the lyrics a second time. The Edge used a Bond Electraglide guitar to play a solo with a "heavy fuzz" sound at the end of the song. Three musicians from Toronto—Dick, Paul and Adele Armin—recorded string pieces for the song in Grant Avenue Studio in Hamilton, Ontario. In a six-hour phone call with the Edge, and under the supervision of producer Daniel Lanois, the Armins used "sophisticated 'electro-acoustic' string instrument[s]" they developed called Raads to record a piece created for the song. Dick Armin said, "[U2] were interested in using strings, but not in the conventional style of sweetening. They didn't want a 19th-century group playing behind them." Bono found the song so emotional, he was unable to listen to it after it had been recorded.

In the song, Bono included the lyric: "Jara sang, his song a weapon in the hands of love / You know his blood still cries from the ground". This refers to the Chilean political activist and folk singer Víctor Jara, who became a symbol of the resistance against the Augusto Pinochet military dictatorship after he was tortured and killed during the 1973 Chilean coup d'état. Bono learned of Jara after meeting René Castro, a Chilean mural artist, while on Amnesty International's A Conspiracy of Hope tour. Castro had been tortured and held in a concentration camp for two years by the military because his artwork criticised the Pinochet-led regime that had seized power in 1973 during the coup. While purchasing a silkscreen of Martin Luther King Jr. that Castro had created, Bono noticed a print of Jara. He became more familiar with him after reading Una Canción Truncada (An Unfinished Song), written by Jara's widow Joan Turner.

"One Tree Hill" and The Joshua Tree are dedicated to Carroll's memory. The track was recorded by Flood and Pat McCarthy, mixed by Dave Meegan, and produced by Lanois and Eno.

== Composition and theme ==
"One Tree Hill"
Thirty-second sample of "One Tree Hill" containing lyrical references to Victor Jara and the funeral of Greg Carroll

"One Tree Hill" runs for 5 minutes, 23 seconds. It is played in common time at a tempo of 120 beats per minute. The song begins with a highlife-influenced riff by the Edge on guitar, which repeats in the background throughout the song. Percussion from drummer Larry Mullen Jr. enters after two seconds. At 0:07, a second guitar enters. At 0:15, Clayton's bass and Mullen's drums enter, and at 0:31, the verse chord progression of C–F–B♭–F–C is introduced. The first verse begins at 0:47. At 1:32, the song moves to the chorus, switching to a C–B♭–F–C chord progression. The second verse then begins at 1:49, and after the second chorus, a brief musical interlude begins at 2:36, in which the Edge's guitar is replaced by the Raad strings. The third verse begins at 3:07, and the Edge's guitar resumes at 3:38 in the chorus. A guitar solo begins at 4:16 and is played until the instrumentation comes to a close at 4:36. After two seconds of silence, the Raad strings fade in and Bono proceeds to sing the coda. The final lyric and strings fade out over the final six seconds.

Clayton called it part of a trilogy of songs on the album, along with "Bullet the Blue Sky" and "Mothers of the Disappeared", that decry the involvement of the United States in the Chilean coup. McGuinness stated that the imagery in the song described the sense of tragedy felt by the band over Carroll's death. Colm O'Hare of Hot Press believed the Edge's guitar riff personified the lyric "run like a river runs to the sea". Thom Duffy of the Orlando Sentinel felt the song reflected the seduction of a lover. Richard Harrington of The Washington Post acknowledged the tribute to Carroll, adding that it demonstrated U2's belief that music could spur change.

Like many other U2 songs, "One Tree Hill" can be interpreted in a religious manner. Hot Press editor Niall Stokes called it "a spiritual tour de force", saying "it is a hymn of praise and celebration which described the traditional Māori burial of their friend on One Tree Hill and links it poetically with themes of renewal and redemption." Beth Maynard, a Church rector from Fairhaven, Massachusetts, felt the song "vows faith in the face of loss, combining elegiac lines about a friend ... and the martyred Chilean activist and folk singer Victor Jara, with a subtle evocation of end-time redemption and a wrenching wail to God to send the pentecostal Latter Rain." Matt Soper, Senior Minister of the West Houston Church of Christ, believed the lyrics were an attempt by Bono to understand God's place in the world. Steve Stockman, a chaplain at Queen's University Belfast, felt that the song alluded to "transcendent places beyond the space and time of earth". Music journalist Bill Graham noted "the lyrics, with their reference to traditional Māori burial ceremonies on One Tree Hill, indicated that the band's faith didn't exclude an empathy with others' beliefs and rituals. Their Christianity wouldn't plaster over the universal archetypes of mourning."

== Release and reception ==
"One Tree Hill" was released on The Joshua Tree on 9 March 1987 as the ninth song on the album. Some CD pressings incorrectly split the tracks, with the song's coda included as part of the track for the following song, "Exit". In New Zealand and Australia, "One Tree Hill" was released as a 7-inch single in March 1988. The cover art (photographed by Anton Corbijn), sleeve (designed by Steve Averill), and B-sides ("Bullet the Blue Sky" and "Running to Stand Still") were identical to those used for U2's 1987 single "In God's Country", released only in North America. A cassette single, available only in New Zealand, was also released. The song reached number one on the New Zealand Singles Chart. "One Tree Hill" was included as a bonus track on the Japanese version of U2's 1998 compilation album, The Best of 1980–1990. The accompanying video compilation included the song's music video, directed by Phil Joanou, which features a live performance taken from a previously unreleased cut of U2's 1988 rockumentary Rattle and Hum. Additional live performances were released on the digital album Live from the Point Depot (2004) and the U2.com member-exclusive album U22 (2012). Select editions of the 30th anniversary release of The Joshua Tree in 2017 featured a remix of "One Tree Hill" by St Francis Hotel and a new mix of the song's reprise by Brian Eno.

"One Tree Hill" was received favourably by critics. Hot Press editor Niall Stokes described it as one of U2's best tracks, calling it a "fitting tribute" to Carroll. The Toronto Star felt it was one of the best songs on the album. Steve Morse of The Boston Globe compared Bono's vocals at the song's conclusion to the passion of American soul singer Otis Redding, also noting that the coda was reminiscent of the hymn "Amazing Grace". Steve Pond of Rolling Stone called it "a soft, haunting benediction". Bill Graham of Hot Press said the song was "hopeful, not grim", describing the lyric "We run like a river to the sea" as "[musician Mike Scott's] metaphor recast in terms of eternal life and the Maori's own belief." He described the Edge's playing as "a loose-limbed guitar melody with both an African and a Hawaiian tinge", concluding by saying "despite its moving vocal coda, 'One Tree Hill' isn't sombre. It celebrates the life of the spirit not its extinction."

Writing for The New York Times, John Rockwell felt that it was an example of U2 stretching their range, saying "the inclusion of musical idioms [is] never so overtly explored before on a U2 record, especially the gospel chorus of 'One Tree Hill'". Colin Hogg of The New Zealand Herald called it "a remarkable musical centrepiece", believing it to be the best song on the album. Colm O'Hare of Hot Press said it was "arguably the most poignant, emotionally-charged song U2 have ever recorded." He added that it was the "least instrumentally adorned song on the album, resplendent in a feeling of space and openness." McGuinness called it one of his favourite U2 songs.

The American television drama One Tree Hill was named for the song after series creator Mark Schwahn was listening to The Joshua Tree when writing the idea for the show. "One Tree Hill" was also the name of the series finale, which featured the song in the episode's final scene.

== Live performances ==
"We've never performed 'One Tree Hill', and I can't. In fact I haven't even heard the song, though I've listened to it a hundred times. I've cut myself off from it completely."

— Bono in 1987

"One Tree Hill" made its live debut on 10 September 1987 in Uniondale, New York, the opening night of the third leg of the Joshua Tree Tour, where it opened the encore. The song had been left out of the set up to this point because Bono feared he would be unable to overcome his emotions in the live setting. Despite his fears, the song received an enthusiastic reaction from the audience. It was performed a further six times and then dropped from the show for a period of two months. It was revived in the main set on 17 November 1987 in Los Angeles, California, and played a further nine times on the tour. "One Tree Hill" was played occasionally on the Lovetown Tour, appearing at 19 of 47 concerts. The penultimate performance, on 31 December 1989, was broadcast live on radio to 21 countries throughout Europe as a New Year's Eve present from the band.

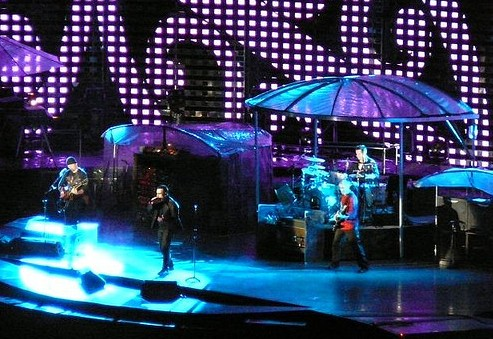
U2 performing "One Tree Hill" in Auckland in 2006

"One Tree Hill" was absent during the majority of the Zoo TV Tour, only appearing as an extended snippet at the end of "One" at both concerts in New Zealand in 1993. It did not appear again until 24 November 2006 in Auckland, New Zealand, on the final leg of the Vertigo Tour. It was considered to close the concert, but tour designer Willie Williams voiced concern as it had not been performed in full since 1990. The song was performed before "Sometimes You Can't Make It on Your Own" in the main set instead. U2 performed it an additional three times on the tour. "One Tree Hill" was absent for the majority of the U2 360° Tour but was revived in November 2010 for two concerts in New Zealand, where it was dedicated to the miners who died in the Pike River Mine disaster; their names were displayed on the video screen during the song. Dedicating the song, Bono said, "we wrote it for Greg Carroll, whose family are with us tonight. But tonight it belongs to the miners of the West Coast Pike River." U2 played "One Tree Hill" on 25 March 2011, in Santiago, Chile, in a duet with Francisca Valenzuela, and they dedicated it to Victor Jara. It was also played during the encore at a show in Chicago on 5 July 2011 to honour the 25th anniversary of the Carroll's death.

In 2009, when asked about the likelihood of U2 performing the song, the Edge said, "it's one we kind of keep for special occasions, like playing New Zealand." Bono added, "it's a very special song that holds inside of it a lot of strong feelings, and I don't know if we're afraid of it or something, but we should be playing it more." McGuinness said that U2 found it difficult to play live.

"One Tree Hill" returned to live performances during the Joshua Tree Tours 2017 and 2019, which featured 51 concerts in mid-2017 and 15 concerts in late-2019; each concert featured a full performance of the entire Joshua Tree album in running order. Each song from the album was accompanied by a video shown on the set's LED video screen that served as a backdrop to the band's performance. The video played during "One Tree Hill" featured images of a blood red-coloured moon that faded into footage of Native American people. It was directed by Anton Corbijn and filmed in Lancaster, California over a 14-hour film shoot. Performances in 2017 were dedicated to singer Chris Cornell (who died in May 2017), to singer Chester Bennington (who died in July 2017), to the victims of the Manchester Arena bombing, and to the victims of the Orlando nightclub shooting. The opening concerts of the 2019 tour took place in Auckland, where the band paid tribute to Greg Carroll prior to performing "One Tree Hill" and featured an image of Carroll on the screen at the end of the song.

== Track listing ==
All lyrics are written by Bono; all music is composed by U2.

7" vinyl, cassette
No.	Title	Length
1.	"One Tree Hill"	5:23
2.	"Bullet the Blue Sky"	4:32
3.	"Running to Stand Still"	4:20
Total length:		14:15

== Credits and personnel ==
U2 (Note: The band members' instruments are not credited on the album's liner notes, aside from the Edge's backing vocals and Bono's harmonica. Their primary instruments are listed based on their accounts of the album's recording and their de facto primary roles in the group.)

- Bono – lead vocals
- The Edge – guitar, backing vocals
- Adam Clayton – bass guitar
- Larry Mullen Jr. – drums

Additional performers

- Dick Armin – Raad cello
- Paul Armin – Raad viola
- Adele Armin – Raad violin

Technical

- Production – Brian Eno, Daniel Lanois
- Recording – Flood
- Recording assistance – Pat McCarthy
- Mixing – Dave Meegan

== Charts ==
=== Weekly charts ===
Chart (1988)	Peak position
New Zealand (Recorded Music NZ)	1

=== Year-end charts ===
Chart (1988)	Position
New Zealand (Recorded Music NZ)	2

== Certifications ==
Region	Certification	Certified units/sales
New Zealand (RMNZ)	Gold	10,000^{*}
^{*} Sales figures based on certification alone.

== See also ==
- List of cover versions of U2 songs – One Tree Hill
