= Mothers of the Disappeared =

1987 song by U2

Song by U2

from the album The Joshua Tree
- Released: 9 March 1987
- Recorded: July–December 1986
- Studio: Melbeach (Dublin)
- Genre: Rock
- Length: 5:14
- Label: Island
- Composer: U2
- Lyricist: Bono
- Producers: Daniel Lanois; Brian Eno

"Mothers of the Disappeared" is a song by Irish rock band U2. It is the eleventh and final track on their 1987 album The Joshua Tree. The song was inspired by lead singer Bono's experiences in Nicaragua and El Salvador in July 1986, following U2's participation in the Conspiracy of Hope tour of benefit concerts for Amnesty International. He learned of the Madres de Plaza de Mayo, a group of women whose children had "forcibly disappeared" at the hands of the Argentine dictatorship, a situation that also happened during the Chilean dictatorship. While in Central America, he met members of COMADRES, a similar organization whose children had been abducted by the government in El Salvador. Bono sympathized with the Madres and COMADRES and wanted to pay tribute to their cause.

The song was written on a Spanish guitar, and the melody lifted from a piece Bono composed in Ethiopia in 1985 to help teach children basic forms of hygiene. The lyrics contain an implicit criticism of the Reagan Administration, which backed two South American regimes that seized power during coups d'état and which provided financial support for the military regime in El Salvador. Thematically it has been interpreted as an examination of failures and contradictions in U.S. foreign policy. The drum beat provided by Larry Mullen Jr. was processed through an effects unit that gave it a drone-like quality, which bassist Adam Clayton described as "evocative of that sinister death squad darkness".

"Mothers of the Disappeared" was favourably received by critics, who variously described it as "powerful", "a moving tribute", and containing "stunning beauty and sadness". The song was played seven times on the 1987 Joshua Tree Tour, and some recordings were considered for the ending sequence of the 1988 film Rattle and Hum. It was revived for four concerts on the 1998 PopMart Tour in South America, and for two of them, the Madres joined the band onstage for the performance, one of which was broadcast on television in Chile. Bono used the opportunity to ask former Chilean dictator General Augusto Pinochet to reveal to the Madres the locations of their children's bodies. The song was played a further three times on the U2 360° Tour; one performance was dedicated to Fehmi Tosun, an ethnic Kurd who forcibly disappeared in Turkey in 1995. Bono re-recorded the song a cappella in 1998 for the album ¡Ni Un Paso Atrás! (English: Not One Step Back!).

== Inspiration, writing, and recording ==
Recording sessions for The Joshua Tree began in January 1986 in Danesmoate House in Dublin and continued throughout the year. U2 briefly interrupted these sessions in June to join Amnesty International's A Conspiracy of Hope tour of benefit concerts. Following the first concert in San Francisco, lead singer Bono met René Castro, a Chilean mural artist. Castro had been tortured and held in a concentration camp for two years by the dictatorial Chilean government because his artwork criticised the Pinochet-led regime that seized power in 1973 during a coup d'état. Castro showed Bono a wall painting in the Mission District that depicted the ongoing plight in Chile and Argentina. He also learned of the Madres de Plaza de Mayo, a group of women whose children were forcibly disappeared by the Argentine government. The Madres' children were usually young people who had opposed the government during the Dirty War, and the coup d'état that brought Jorge Rafael Videla to power. The Madres joined together to campaign for information regarding the locations of their children's bodies and the circumstances of their deaths, believing them to have been kidnapped, tortured, and murdered.

Inspired by the mural, Bono took an extended break from recording into July, traveling to Nicaragua and El Salvador with his wife, Alison Hewson, to see first-hand the distress of peasants bullied by political conflicts and U.S. military intervention. While there, they worked with the Central American Mission Partners (CAMP), a human rights and economic development organization. In El Salvador they met members of the Comité de Madres Monsignor Romero (COMADRES: Committee of the Mothers Monsignor Romero), an organization of women whose children were forcibly disappeared by the Salvadoran government during the Civil War because they opposed the military regime that was in power. At one point during the trip, Bono, Alison, and a member of CAMP were shot at by government troops while on their way to deliver aid to a group of farmers. The shots were a warning and, according to author John Luerssen, the incident made Bono realize that "they didn't care for their intrusion and they could kill them if they felt compelled."

In 2006, Bono recounted another experience he had in El Salvador, where he had seen a body thrown from a van into the road. He remarked, "People would just disappear. If you were part of the opposition, you might find an SUV with the windows blacked out parked outside your house.... If that didn't stop you, occasionally they would come in and take you and murder you; there would be no trial." Bono understood the cause of the Madres and COMADRES and wanted to pay tribute to it. His experiences in Central America inspired the lyrics of "Mothers of the Disappeared" and another track from The Joshua Tree, "Bullet the Blue Sky".

"I remember [Daniel Lanois], when we were finishing 'Mothers of the Disappeared', losing his mind and performing at the mixing desk like he was Mozart at the piano, head blown back in an imaginary breeze, and it was pouring down with rain outside the studio and I was singing about how 'in the rain we see their tears,' the tears of those who have been disappeared. And when you listen to that mix you can actually hear the rain outside. It was magical really..."

— Bono

"Mothers of the Disappeared" was created and mixed at guitarist the Edge's newly-bought home, Melbeach, which U2 used as a recording studio. Bono wrote the song on his mother-in-law's Spanish guitar; the melody came from a song that Bono wrote in Ethiopia in 1985 to teach children about basic methods of hygiene. The drums, played by Larry Mullen Jr., were lifted from another song ("One Tree Hill", as reported by engineer Dave Meegan) by producer Brian Eno and subsequently slowed down and treated with "a canyon load of reverb". The Edge added a guitar part using a Bond Electraglide guitar, which he abused to produce a sound that he liked. Producer Daniel Lanois was the principal mixer of the song. Bono, likening the studio itself to an instrument, described Lanois's mix as a "performance".

At the conclusion of the lyrics sheet for the song in the liner notes of The Joshua Tree, U2 listed addresses for several branches of Amnesty International, and proceeds from the song were donated to the organization. In 1998, Bono re-recorded the song a cappella in English and Spanish for the album ¡Ni Un Paso Atras! (English: Not One Step Back!), along with a recitation of the William Butler Yeats poem "The Mother of God". The album was created by the Madres in commemoration of the disappearance of their children. The tracks were also recorded for the 1999 film 20 Años... 20 Poemas... 20 Artistas (20 Years... 20 Poems... 20 Artists).

== Composition and theme ==
"There was a love/hate relationship with America. A lot of that album reflected Bono's feelings coming back from El Salvador and the Conspiracy of Hope tour and seeing the brutal face of US foreign policy."

— Larry Mullen Jr.

"Mothers of the Disappeared" runs for 5:14 (5 minutes, 14 seconds). It is played in common time in a key of A. The song begins with the sound of rain hitting a roof, which fades in over the first fourteen seconds alongside the bass and a processed drum loop beat by Mullen which reverberates in the background. Thirty-two seconds into the song, Mullen's drums enter, playing a sporadic beat every four to five seconds. At the fifty-second mark the drums play a more regular beat, and the Edge's guitar, accompanied by Eno's synthesizer, enters. The first verse begins at 1:28, and introduces the chord progression of A_{5}–E_{5}–F♯m–D–A_{5}, which is played in the verses. At 2:41 Eno's keyboards enter, and the song begins to follow a D–D_{5}–A_{5} chord progression, while Bono begins falsetto vocals. The second verse then begins at 3:01. The lyrics end at 3:37, and the song returns to the chord progression of D–D_{5}–A_{5}. The harmony gradually grows in volume until 4:33, at which point the song enters into a coda; the keyboards come to a finish and the guitar returns to playing A notes before fading over the next eight seconds alongside the bass. The synthesizer, drums, and drum loop conclude the song, fading out slowly over the last thirty-one seconds.

"Mothers of the Disappeared"
Thirty-second sample of "Mothers of the Disappeared" containing drums that evoke "an abstract sense of evil and dread" and vocals from Bono that convey "ineffable sadness".

Eno used a piano as a percussive instrument and mixed the result with the drum loop through a PCM70 effects unit to create a sound that bassist Adam Clayton called "eerie and foreign and scary". Lanois stated that the processing of Mullen's beat, which resulted in a drone-like sound, became the song's backbone and personality. Clayton described it as "evocative of that sinister death squad darkness". Colm O'Hare of Hot Press felt it was "the key sonic element" because it "[evokes] an abstract sense of evil and dread".

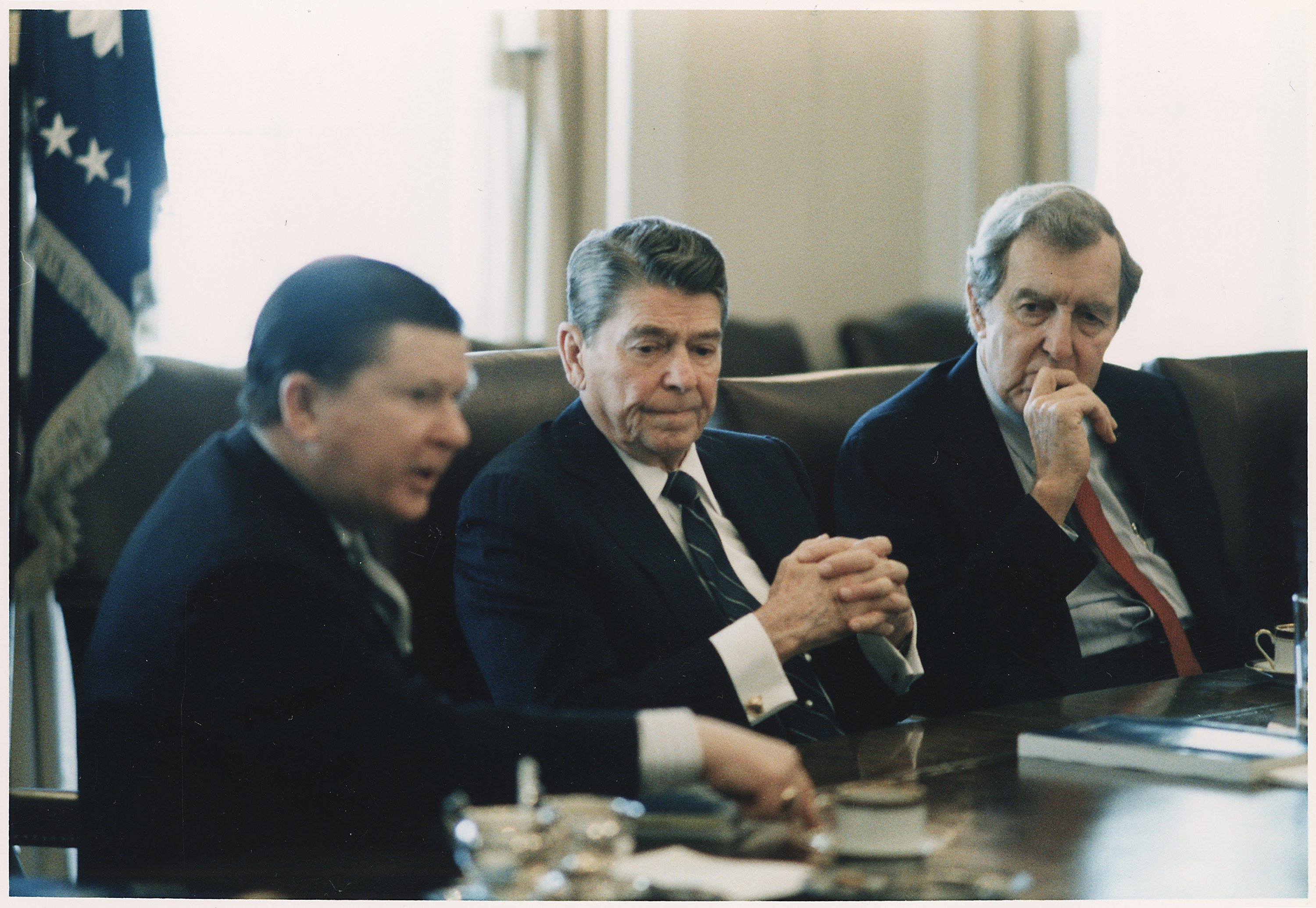
Ronald Reagan (centre) with Tower Commission members John Tower (left) and Edmund Muskie (right); the Reagan Administration's backing of the regimes in Central and South America was a thematic influence on the song.

In December 1986, Bono stated that he had a love–hate relationship with America, and that this influenced his work on the album. Speaking of his encounter with COMADRES in El Salvador and their impact on the song, he said, "There's no question in my mind of the Reagan Administration's involvement in backing the regime that is committing these atrocities. I doubt if the people of America are even aware of this. It's not my position to lecture them or tell them their place or to even open their eyes up to it in a very visual way, but it is affecting me and it affects the words I write and the music we make." In 2007, Clayton said "'Mothers of the Disappeared' was not just a reflection on what had happened under the military government in Chile but also at the US which had supported that government", and described Bono's vocals as "prehistoric", saying "it connects with something very primitive."

Greg Garrett, an English professor at Baylor University, saw the song as an effort to "[respond] to growing interests in doing justice—and calling to attention American failures in that regard", noting that the regimes in South America had been supported by the United States because of their anti-communist positions, even though their tactics were in opposition to the democratic values that "America claims to champion around the world". Lisa Hand of the Sunday Independent noted the influence of America on the track, remarking, "[it] does not confine itself simply to the music, but also extends to some of the lyrics. However, far from being a tribute to the star-spangled banner, the words highlight the political untruths and ambiguities which exist within the U.S. 'Mothers of the Disappeared' and 'Bullet the Blue Sky' both take a hard look at the American involvement in South America". Richard Harrington of The Washington Post described the song as "a simple lament of great beauty and sadness pleading for the realization that ideological battles about right and left obscure the more important issue of right and wrong." Author David Kootnikoff described it as a "[portrait] of the American Dream gone rancid".

== Live performances ==
U2 debuted "Mothers of the Disappeared" on 14 April 1987 in San Diego, California, on the first leg of the Joshua Tree Tour, where it closed the concert in place of the band's long-time finale "40". It was performed three more times on the leg; twice to open the encore and once to conclude the main set. U2 revived the song seven months later on the third leg, playing it in the encore at three of the final four concerts on the tour.

The final two performances were held in Tempe, Arizona on 19 and 20 December 1987 and were filmed for the 1988 film Rattle and Hum. U2 sang the refrain "el pueblo vencerá", which means "the people will overcome" in Spanish, at the conclusion of the song. Bono noted that the Madres use the phrase for motivation. The Edge said "we're so close to a Spanish speaking part of the world, we felt that maybe people at the concert might pick up on this lyric." Bono added that they had closed every concert since 1983 with the song "40", and so they were looking to replace it with "Mothers of the Disappeared" from that point on. He explained, "If the people of Arizona sing this, and if it goes into the film and onto the record, wherever we go in a way for the next few years, that will be taken up again. It'll be an interesting experiment ...". The footage was considered for the closing sequence of the film, but the band eventually decided against including it. "Pride (In the Name of Love)" was used as the final live song, and "All I Want Is You" was chosen to play over the credits.

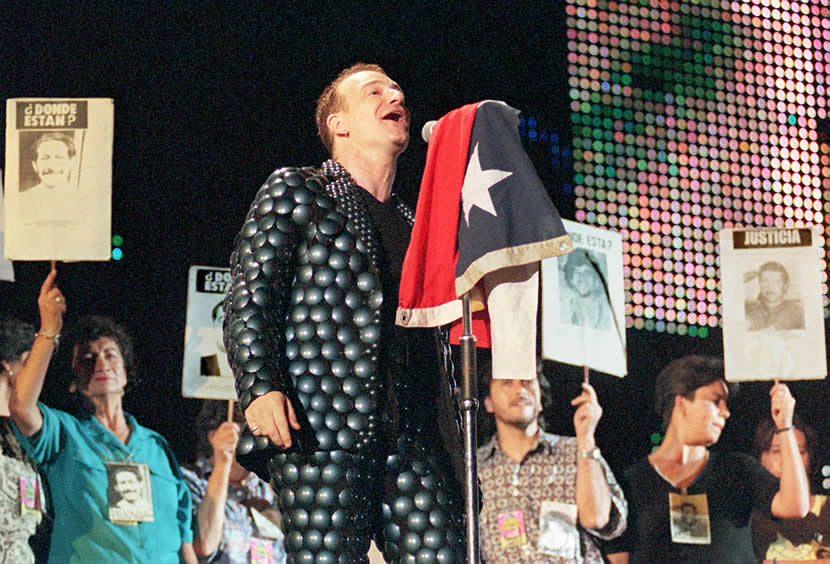
Relatives of missing detainees join U2 onstage during a performance in Santiago, Chile, on the PopMart Tour in 1998.

Following the seven performances on the Joshua Tree Tour, U2 did not perform "Mothers of the Disappeared" until 1998, on the fourth leg of the PopMart Tour. It was played at three concerts in Argentina and once in Chile, concluding all four shows. Bono sang "el pueblo vencerá" at the end of each performance. The first rendition was on 5 February 1998 in Buenos Aires, where it was performed with the Madres accompanying them onstage. The song was played by just Bono and the Edge and was set against footage of the Madres on the video screen. At the conclusion of the song, the band members faced the Madres and applauded, an act in which the rest of the audience joined. Part of the performance was later included on the television documentary Classic Albums: The Joshua Tree.

The cost of the tickets was too high for many fans in South America, so the band broadcast the 11 February concert in Chile live on television. Knowing that many people in the country would be watching, they played "Mothers of the Disappeared" in place of "Wake Up Dead Man". The stadium in which the concert was held had been used as a prison camp by Pinochet's regime following the coup d'état. Again it was performed solely by Bono and the Edge against footage of the Madres, and they invited the women to join them onstage a second time. The Madres held up photographs of their children and spoke about them briefly during the performance, an act which received a mixed reception from the audience. Bono made a plea to Pinochet, asking him to "tell these women where are the bones of their children."

"Mothers of the Disappeared" was performed again on the fourth leg of the Vertigo Tour, on 26 February 2006 in Santiago and 2 March in Buenos Aires. Although it was rehearsed by the full band, it was played only by Bono and the Edge in an arrangement similar to the one from the PopMart Tour. The Edge performed the song on a charango that Chilean President Ricardo Lagos had given to Bono earlier that day. It was played at three concerts on the third leg of the U2 360° Tour in place of "MLK". One performance in Istanbul, Turkey was dedicated to Fehmi Tosun, an ethnic Kurd who was kidnapped in October 1995 and subsequently disappeared. The abduction was witnessed by his wife and daughter; no information regarding his disappearance has ever been released.

For the first time in 30 years, a full band arrangement of "Mothers of the Disappeared" returned to U2's live set for the Joshua Tree Tours 2017 and 2019. The two tours featured 51 concerts in mid-2017 and 15 concerts in late-2019, each of which featured a performance of the entire Joshua Tree album in running order. Eddie Vedder and Mumford & Sons accompanied U2 on-stage for a performance of the song during a May 2017 show in Seattle, and Patti Smith performed the song with the band in July 2017 in Paris.

== Reception ==
"Mothers of the Disappeared" was favourably received by critics. Steve Morse of The Boston Globe called the song "powerful" and described the backing vocals as tender and choirlike. Don McLeese of the Chicago Sun-Times described it as a "hymn to human rights". Adrian Thrills of NME called it "a simple, plaintive lament of stunning beauty and sadness". Nicholas Jennings of Maclean's felt that it was The Joshua Tree's "most topical song". Music journalist Andrew Mueller felt the track was a "wilfully downbeat finale". In Rolling Stone, Steve Pond said "'Mothers of the Disappeared' is built around desolate images of loss, but the setting is soothing and restorative—music of great sadness but also of unutterable compassion, acceptance and calm." Lennox Samuels of The Dallas Morning News stated that there was "an ineffable sadness in Bono's vocals and images where 'Night hangs like a prisoner / Stretched over black and blue' ", calling it "a moving tribute" to people around the world who had lost loved ones to warfare and conflict. He added "[w]hat's remarkable about the song is that despite the intrinsic pain, it remains eerily cleansing. Even in the midst of decay and excess and horror, Bono can find hope and absolution." In 2006 Bono described it as "a beautiful end to the album", saying, "That song means as much to me as any of the songs on that album, it's right up there for me," and noting that it is a song "I'm very proud of to this day."

Barbara Jaeger of The Bergen Record likened "Mothers of the Disappeared" to "New Year's Day" and "Pride (In the Name of Love)", stating that the band used all three to "stir political consciousness and to urge social commitment." Thirteen years later, Ryan Jones, in his review of U2's 2000 album All That You Can't Leave Behind for the same publication, said the song "Peace on Earth" contained echoes of "Mothers of the Disappeared" in its lyrics and the tone of the instrumental prelude. In reviewing the group's 2009 album No Line on the Horizon, Mueller said the closing "Cedars of Lebanon" "maintains this essentially optimistic group's counter-intuitive tradition of ending their albums with rueful comedowns", likening it to "Mothers of the Disappeared". McLeese believed that the song had its roots in "the folklike purity of traditional Irish music". According to Luerssen the song is "notorious" in Central and South America, and it is often "played as an act of defiance" by the Madres. Art for Amnesty cited the song, and the effect it had in spreading Amnesty International's human rights message, as one of the reasons why U2 were awarded the Ambassador of Conscience Award by the organization in 2005.

Reflecting on the applause given to the Madres during the PopMart concert in Buenos Aires, the U2 magazine Propaganda called the result "about the most moving thing I've ever seen on a rock stage. It was one of those ideas that really could have gone either way, but the obvious empathy of the audience towards these women made it an unforgettable moment." Following the televised concert in Chile, Bono said "it was amazing and confounding to discover that on our most 'pop' of tours some of the best shows were in political hotspots like Santiago, Sarajevo, Tel Aviv ... anywhere music meant more than entertainment". He added "to be able to address General Pinochet from the stage on live television in Chile and say, 'Give the dead back to the living. Please, General Pinochet, tell these women where the bones of their sons and daughters are.' That was an extraordinary moment ... certainly in my life and U2's." When asked if the negative reaction from some of the audience had disappointed the band Bono said it had not, stating "it's proof to me that a rock 'n' roll audience are not lemmings.... If they don't agree with you, they will let you know – but that doesn't mean they're not fans.... I was flattered that we weren't just playing to people who agreed with us." U2's performance was later credited with inspiring a protest in the Chilean Parliament against Pinochet, who was in the process of becoming a Senator for life after relinquishing his position as head of the armed forces. The opposition party brought in the Madres, who again held pictures of their disappeared children and asked for information on the location of their bodies.

"Mothers of the Disappeared" has been covered several times. The Vitamin String Quartet included it on their 2004 tribute album The String Quartet Tribute to U2's The Joshua Tree. Paddy Casey recorded a version for the tsunami relief album Even Better Than the Real Thing Vol. 3 in 2005.

== Credits and personnel ==
U2

- Bono – lead vocals
- The Edge – guitars, backing vocals
- Adam Clayton – bass guitar
- Larry Mullen Jr. – drums, percussion

Additional performers

- Brian Eno – keyboards, synthesizer

Technical

- Daniel Lanois – mixing
- Flood – recording

== See also ==
- "They Dance Alone" – a song by Sting that treats the same subject
