= Bond Electraglide =

Electric guitar made in England in the mid-1980s

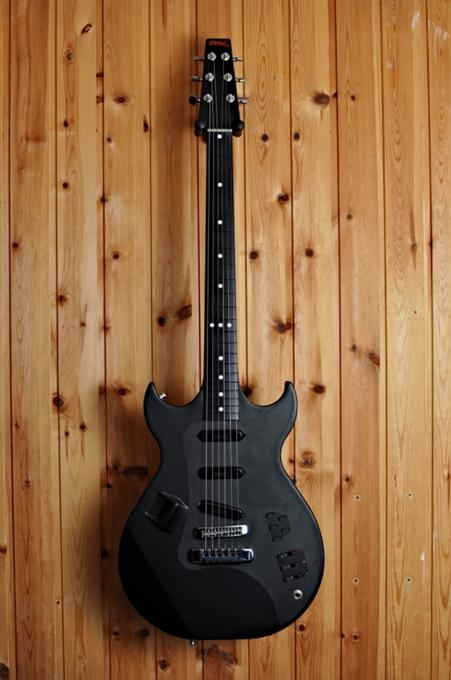
- Manufacturer: Bond Guitar Company
- Period: 1984–1986

Construction
- Body type: Solid

Woods
- Body: Carbon fiber
- Neck: Carbon fiber
- Fretboard: Anodized aluminum stepped fingerboard

Hardware
- Pickup: 3 humbucker pick-ups

Colors available
- Black

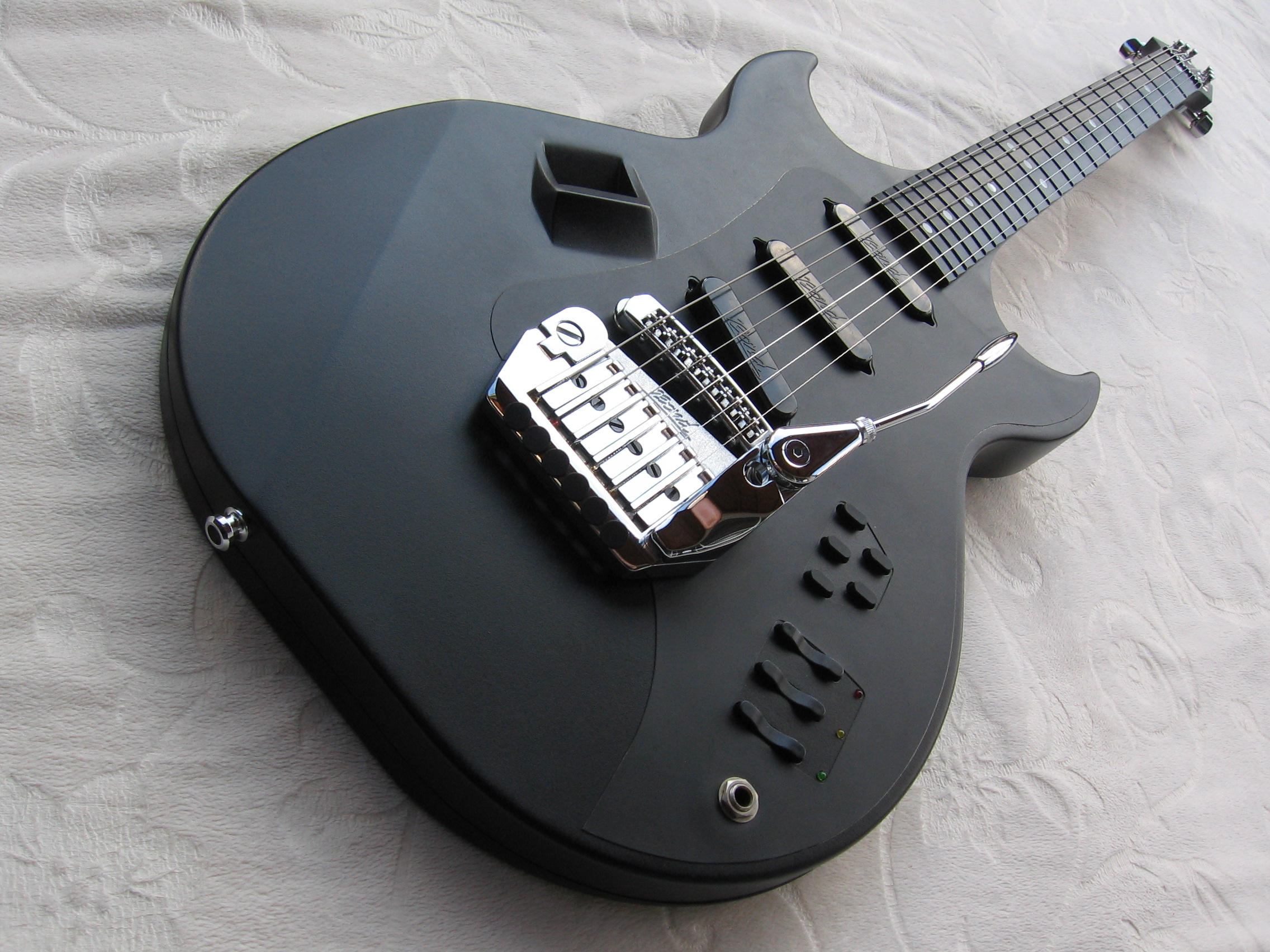
Bond Electraglide Tremolo

The Bond Electraglide was a solid body carbon fibre electric guitar manufactured by the Bond Guitar Company from 1984 to 1986. The Electraglide is visually styled on the Gibson Melody Maker (with the 1962–onwards double cut-away), with a unique stepped anodized aluminum fingerboard instead of traditional frets.

Pickup switching, volume and tone controls were completely digital, powered by a large internal motherboard, and the player selected pickups via five push-buttons; the volume, treble and bass were incremented numerically via digital rocker switches, confirmed by a three-colour LED readout. Due to the state of digital technology at the time, the system required an external power supply pack, and was relatively bulky. Between 1,000 and 1,400 guitars were produced.

The Edge of U2 used the guitar extensively on The Joshua Tree, including the solo on "One Tree Hill", as well as on "Exit", and "Mothers of the Disappeared". He said of the guitar: "The strings started to vibrate on the fretboard... the guitar having no true frets, it created a different kind of effect. It was an attempt to sound obnoxious."

British guitarist Mick Jones is known to have used a Bond Electraglide with his band Big Audio Dynamite in the mid-1980s. Will Sergeant of Echo & the Bunnymen, John Turnbull, and Dave Stewart of Eurythmics were also Electraglide users.

The Bond Guitar Company was set up by Andrew Bond (who died in 1999) in Muir of Ord, Scotland, in 1984. The company ceased trading in 1986.

A Bond Electraglide was acquired by National Museums Scotland in 2013.

Though being quite costly at the time the company was active, they never maintained their value on the second hand market.

== History ==
Andrew Bond and Ian Flooks met in 1972.

Bond had adapted his Gibson guitar with a prototype of the ’saw tooth’ fret board and, between them, Bond and Flooks scraped together enough money to file patents for the unique fret board. They incorporated Bond Guitars Ltd as partners in 1973 and continued to adapt guitars with the new fretboard for several years.

Flooks became a talent agent and, in 1979, formed his own agency, Wasted Talent. Within a year Wasted Talent had signed many of the major acts of the eighties including The Clash, Ian Dury, Talking Heads, Eurythmics and U2.

At that time Bond was perfecting the design of the Bond Electraglide, a revolutionary new guitar which, in addition to the hard anodised aluminium saw tooth fretboard, was made from carbon fibre - with an injection moulded body. The hollow body contained on board electronics which controlled volume, tone and pick up selection.

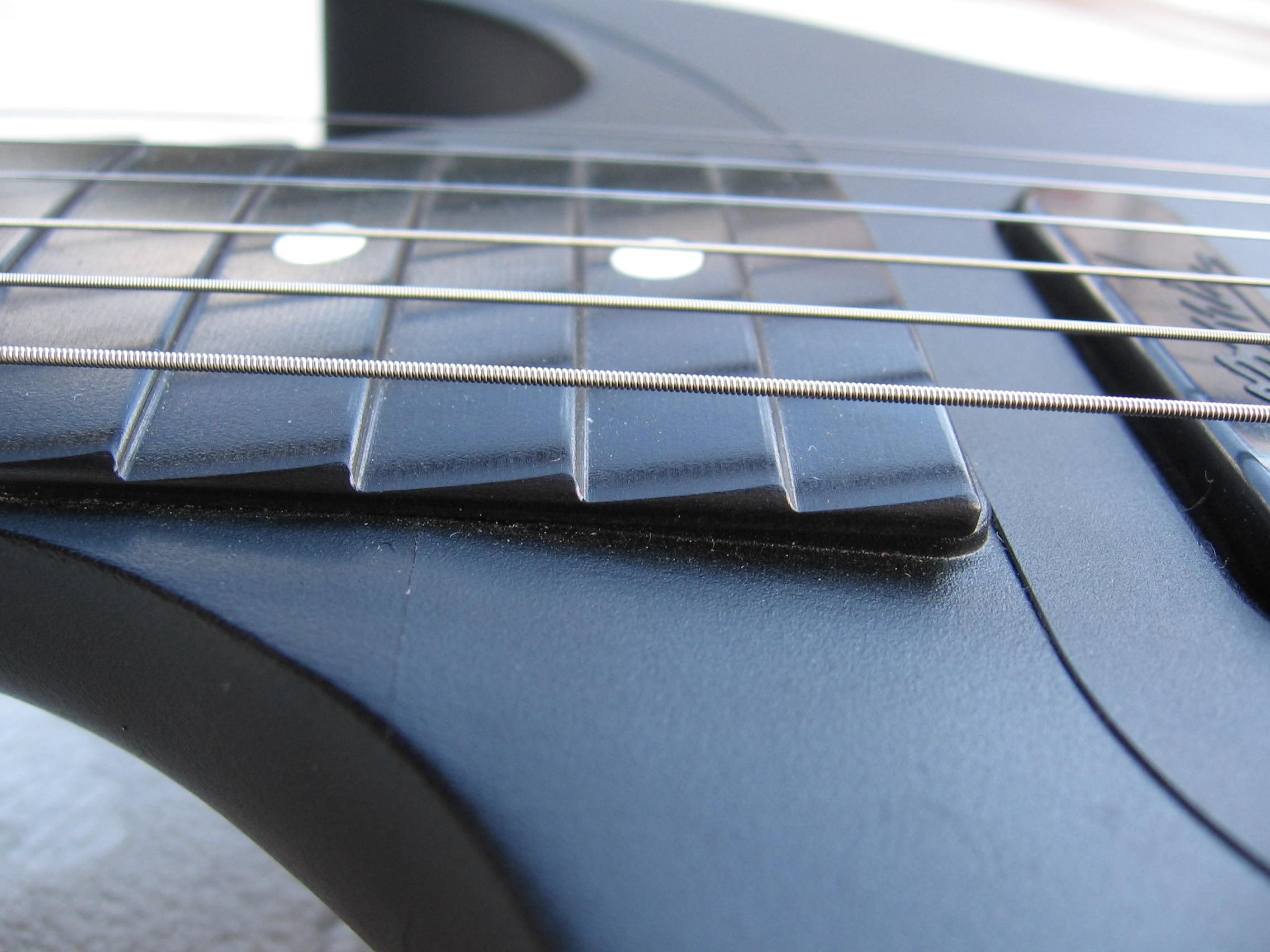

In order to realise this dream, Bond, with help from the Highlands and Islands Development Board, funded the opening of a factory in Muir of Ord in Northern Scotland. The factory had 40 employees, and set about building the Electraglide. The sales team at that time were Ray Haines and Kenny Smith.(Smith later went on to manage Eurythmics).

The first Electraglides rolled off the production line in 1984, and their use was pioneered by several Wasted Talent acts, including U2’s The Edge, Dave Stewart (Eurythmics) and Mick Jones (The Clash; Big Audio Dynamite).

Dave Stewart, together with Bond and Flooks, took the Electraglide to the 1985 Messe Frankfurt (Frankfurt Trade Fair), and the interest in the guitar was enormous - major distribution companies in all the main territories came on board.

Wasted Talent is now a digital media company which owns Kerrang!, Mixmag and The Face.

Revival

In the mid-2020s, the Bond Electraglide was revived by Ashley Bond, son of original inventor Andrew Bond, more than forty years after the instrument’s initial production ended.

Ashley Bond established Bond Guitars Limited to reintroduce the brand as a British boutique manufacturer, retaining the defining stepped aluminium fretboard design while applying modern manufacturing methods. Development has focused on CNC-machined aluminium fretboards produced to precise tolerances based on the original geometry.

The revived Bond instruments are produced in limited quantities, with an emphasis on craftsmanship and direct-to-customer distribution. Early activity has included the release of standalone fretboards and the development of new guitar models incorporating the original design principles.

The revival has attracted interest from musicians associated with the original Electraglide as well as new players drawn to its distinctive construction. It has been noted for combining historical design with contemporary boutique guitar production.
