= Live from Paris (U2 album) =

2007 concert video and live album by U2

Live album and video by U2
- Released: 20 November 2007
- Recorded: 4 July 1987
- Venues: Hippodrome de Vincennes (Paris, France)
- Genre: Rock
- Length: 84:55
- Label: Mercury

U2 chronology
Vertigo 05: Live from Milan (2006)	Live from Paris (2007)	Medium, Rare & Remastered (2009)

Live from Paris is a concert video and live album by Irish rock band U2. It was recorded during the band's concert at Hippodrome de Vincennes in Paris, France, on 4 July 1987 during the Joshua Tree Tour. The concert was originally released in video form on the bonus DVD that was included in the remastered box set of The Joshua Tree, released on 20 November 2007. The following year, the concert was released as a digital music download exclusively in the iTunes Store on 21 July 2008.

== Track listing ==
1. "I Will Follow" – 3:58
2. "Trip Through Your Wires" – 3:33
3. "I Still Haven't Found What I'm Looking For" / "Exodus" (snippet) – 5:26
4. "MLK" – 1:27
5. "The Unforgettable Fire" – 4:40
6. "Sunday Bloody Sunday" – 5:33
7. "Exit"/"Gloria" (snippet) – 4:12
8. "In God's Country" – 2:52
9. "The Electric Co." / "Break On Through (To the Other Side)" (snippet) – 4:32
10. "Bad" – 7:04
11. "October" – 2:04
12. "New Year's Day" – 4:44
13. "Pride (In the Name of Love)" – 4:55
14. "Bullet the Blue Sky" – 4:53
15. "Running to Stand Still" – 4:07
16. "With or Without You" / "Love Will Tear Us Apart" (snippet) – 9:59
17. "Party Girl" – 4:11
18. "40" – 6:46

Almost the full Parisian gig is included, with three cover songs being excluded from both The Joshua Tree remaster, and the iTunes audio release. The missing songs are "Stand by Me", "C'mon Everybody" (both played before "I Will Follow"), and "Help!" (played between "The Electric Co." and "Bad").

== Chart ==
Chart (2008)	Peak position
US Billboard 200	54

== See also ==
- U2 discography

== Personnel ==
- Bono – lead vocals, harmonica, guitar
- The Edge – guitars, backing vocals, piano, bass guitar on "40", keyboard on "MLK"
- Adam Clayton – bass guitar, backing vocals on "I Will Follow", "Trip Through Your Wires", "Bullet the Blue Sky" and "With or Without You", guitar on "40"
- Larry Mullen Jr. – drums, percussion, backing vocals
