= The Joshua Tree Tour =

1987 concert tour by U2

- Tour by U2
- Promotional poster for the Modena concert
- Location: North America; Europe
- Associated album: The Joshua Tree
- Start date: 2 April 1987
- End date: 20 December 1987
- Legs: 3
- No. of shows: 109
- Attendance: 3.17 million
- Box office: $56 million

U2 concert chronology
- A Conspiracy of Hope (1986); The Joshua Tree Tour (1987); Lovetown Tour (1989–1990)

The Joshua Tree Tour was a concert tour by the Irish rock band U2. Staged in support of their 1987 album The Joshua Tree, it comprised 109 shows over three legs, spanning from April to December that year. The first and third legs visited North America, while the second leg toured Europe. Although it featured minimal production like the group's previous tours, the Joshua Tree Tour was the first to involve larger venues in arenas and stadiums as a result of the album's breakthrough. Much like U2 did on The Joshua Tree, on tour the group explored social and political concerns, along with American roots and mythology, collaborated with American guest musicians and opening acts such as B. B. King. U2 also recorded new material; these songs and their experiences on tour were depicted on the 1988 album and documentary film Rattle and Hum and on the 2007 video and live album Live from Paris. Territories that this tour missed would later be covered by Rattle and Hum's Lovetown Tour.

The Joshua Tree Tour and its album were a huge commercial and critical success, continuing to greatly increase U2's popularity. The tour was the highest-grossing North American tour of the year and overall grossed US$56 million globally from 3.17 million tickets sold. Songs from The Joshua Tree ultimately became staples of U2's concerts on subsequent tours. Despite the band's success, lead vocalist Bono suffered injuries on tour and the band were unprepared for their newfound fame and the tour's intensity. Their experiences combined with the polarised reception of Rattle and Hum led them to change their musical direction and image, beginning with Achtung Baby and the Zoo TV Tour. U2 would later embark on anniversary tours of The Joshua Tree three decades later.

== Itinerary ==
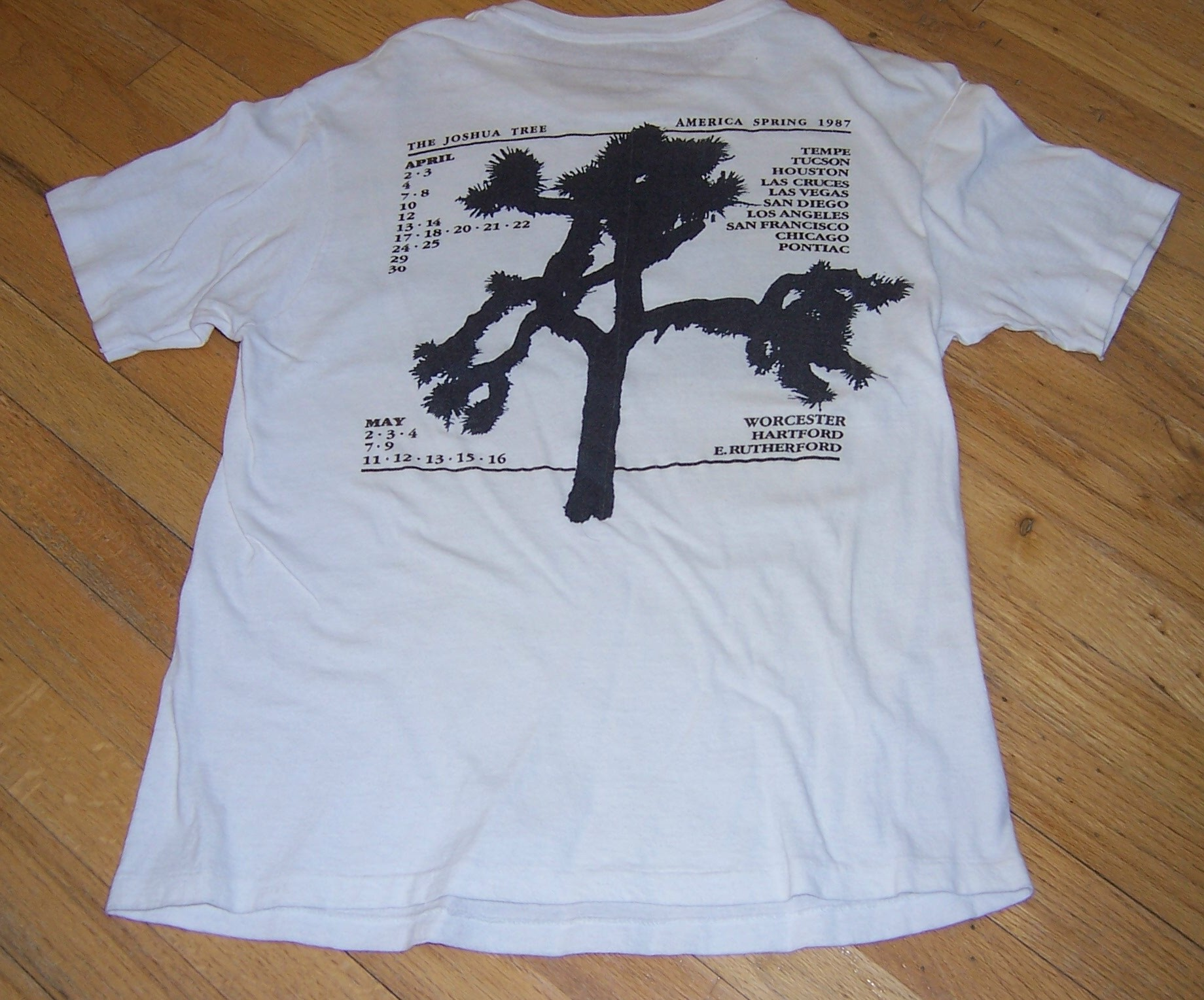
The back of the most common T-shirt from the Joshua Tree Tour's first leg.

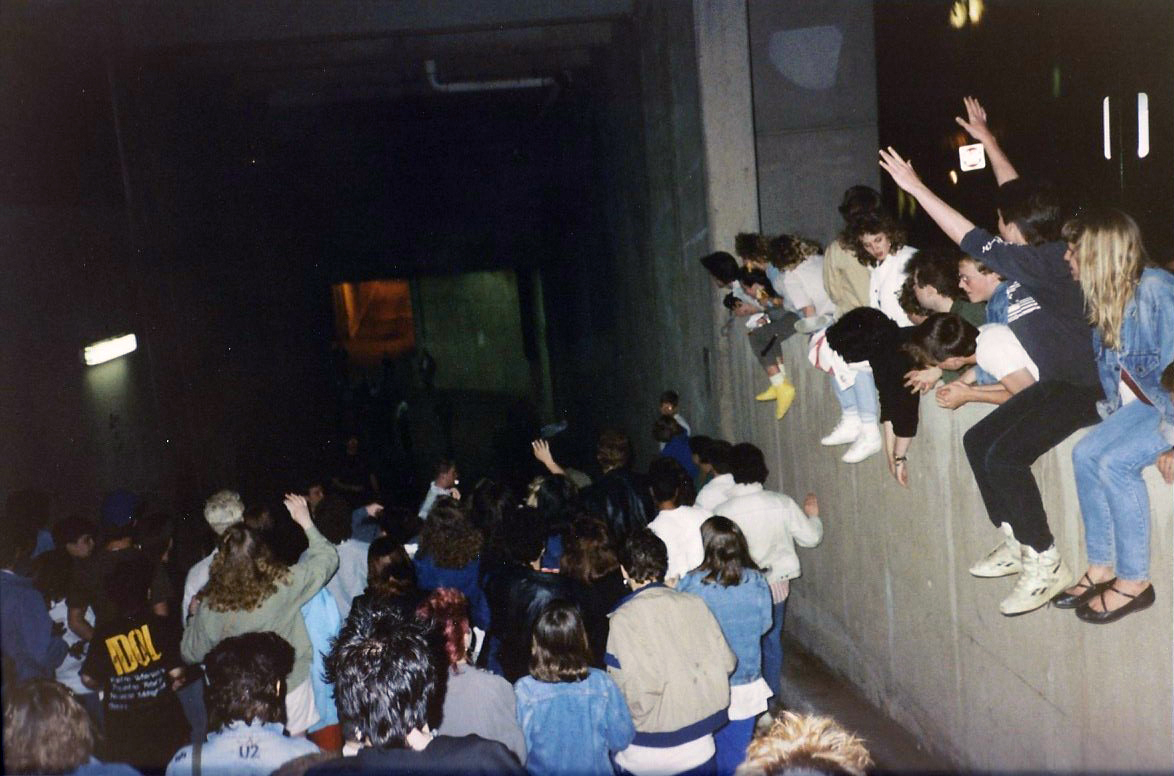
Fans waiting for U2 outside Hartford Civic Center on 9 May

Like their previous tours, the Joshua Tree Tour was a minimalistic, austere production, and U2 used this outlet for addressing political and social concerns. One such issue was Arizona Governor Evan Mecham's canceling the state's observance of Martin Luther King Jr. Day. Throughout the tour, the group continued to explore American roots music: they collaborated with Harlem's New Voices of Freedom gospel choir and visited Graceland and Sun Studio in Memphis, where they recorded new material.

The tour's opening night was 2 April at Arizona State University (ASU)'s Activity Center in Tempe, Arizona. The day before the opening night, frontman Bono fell onto a spotlight he was carrying during a rendition of "Bullet the Blue Sky", cutting open his chin. Bono had partially lost his voice as a result. He was taken to a hospital and the wound was stitched up. He asked the audience to help him sing the majority of the set, which they were happy to do. At the time, it was explained by their publicists in a press release that it was due to the week of rehearsals the band held at the Activity Center and he had over rehearsed his voice. He had fully regained his voice for the second of the two shows at the arena on 4 April. Bono later said, "I was lost in the music and at the start of any tour you're just getting to know the physicality of the stage... and you're overestimating your own physicality. You think you're made of metal and you're not. Cuts and bruises, that's what I remember from The Joshua Tree."

The first leg took place in American indoor arenas during April and May. The first leg finished with 5 concerts at the Brendan Byrne Arena in East Rutherford between 11 and 16 May.

The second leg in European arenas and outdoor stadiums ran from late May through to early August, starting at the Stadio Flaminio in Rome on 27 May. The final show of the European leg is at Páirc Uí Chaoimh in Cork on 8 August.

The third leg returned to American and Canadian arenas and stadiums in the autumn. The tour ended on 20 December back where it started in Tempe, Arizona, but this time at Sun Devil Stadium.

On 30 April, the band played the Pontiac Silverdome, their first headlining stadium show in the United States. While the show's reviews were positive, they said that a video screen is necessary for people at the back. U2 production manager, Willie Williams, recalls the debate within the band about the use of screens and whether they would divide the audience's attention between the stage and the screen. A video screen was installed behind the lighting tower at the 20 September show at the RFK Stadium in Washington, D.C., so the back half of the stadium could better see the band, and screens were used at most stadium shows for the rest of the tour. Bono sustained a second injury during the Washington concert, falling off the rain-slicked stage and dislocating his arm. He completed the performance and had his arm popped back into place after its conclusion. His arm was in a sling for twelve shows between 22 September and 20 October, which is visible at some points during the Rattle and Hum film.

The Joshua Tree elevated the group to a new level of popularity; its tour sold-out arenas and stadiums around the world, the first time the band had consistently played venues of that size. The Joshua Tree and its singles had become huge hits and the band had reached a new height in their popularity. Songs from the album became staples of the tour's set lists, as the group regularly performed eight of the record's eleven tracks, and the only song not to be played was "Red Hill Mining Town". Tickets for shows were often very hard to get, especially on the first American leg when they only played in arenas.

That first leg was also organised around multiple-night stands in centres of U2 fandom along the two U.S. coasts, with only a very few dates in the middle of the country. These multiple-night stands also featured an unusual set list twist. All but the last night would begin in conventional concert fashion with the rousing pair of "Where the Streets Have No Name" into "I Will Follow", but the last night in each city would begin with the house lights fully up and the band performing the early 1960s classic "Stand by Me", with guitarist the Edge singing one verse, all intended as a friendly, informal opening. The house lights would then stay up for "Pride (In the Name of Love)", only going off at the end of it; the rest of the set list would be consequently scrambled from the norm.

The new level of fame, exposure and the frantic nature of the tour put U2 under a large amount of stress. They were dissatisfied creatively, and Bono believed they were musically unprepared for their success. Drummer Larry Mullen Jr. said, "We were the biggest, but we weren't the best", and for Bono the tour was "one of the worst times of [their] musical life". On the road, the group dealt with death threats, along with injuries that Bono sustained from performing. The band hinted that the stresses of touring led them to enjoy the "rock and roll lifestyle" they previously avoided.

== Cover performances ==
At Wembley Stadium in London, Bono sang the Beatles' "Help!", dedicating it to those in the audience who were dreading another five years of the recently re-elected Prime Minister, Margaret Thatcher. As another sign of the group's confidence, they also covered the Beatles' heretofore untouchable "Helter Skelter", declaring "This is a song Charles Manson stole from the Beatles; we're stealin' it back." Other notable covers from the tour included Eddie Cochran's "C'mon Everybody", Peggy Seeger's "The Ballad of Springhill", Neil Young's "Southern Man", the Impressions' "People Get Ready" (during which Bono would invite a fan to play guitar on the song) and numerous Bob Dylan covers including "Maggie's Farm" and "I Shall Be Released". On 20 April, following a performance of "I Shall Be Released" in Los Angeles, the band surprised the audience by bringing out Dylan himself for a performance of Knockin' on Heaven's Door. During the performance, Bono jokingly said, "I usually make up my own words to Bob Dylan songs. He says he doesn't mind." Dylan replied in kind, saying "I do it too." Bono often would sing excerpts of other songs, notably ones by the Rolling Stones and Lou Reed's "Walk on the Wild Side", near the end of the song "Bad" as he had done during the Live Aid performance and would do on later tours.

U2 covered Ben E. King's "Stand by Me" at their 25 September show at Philadelphia's old JFK Stadium, accompanied by a guest performance from Bruce Springsteen.

The band performed "Christmas (Baby Please Come Home)" at their final concert in Tempe, Arizona on 20 December 1987. The band had recorded the track for the compilation album A Very Special Christmas months earlier on the European leg of their tour.

== Filming for Rattle and Hum documentary ==
The band filmed and recorded various shows from the tour for the documentary and album Rattle and Hum, directed by Phil Joanou. The band filmed the black-and-white footage at Denver's McNichols Sports Arena on 7 and 8 November. They chose the city following the success of their Live at Red Rocks: Under a Blood Red Sky video, which was filmed at Red Rocks Amphitheatre in 1983. "We thought lightning might strike twice", said the Edge. Seven songs from the second show were used in the film, none from the first. Hours before the second Denver show, an IRA bomb killed eleven people at a Remembrance Day ceremony in the Northern Irish town of Enniskillen (see Remembrance Day Bombing). Bono addressed the event angrily during the band's performance of Sunday Bloody Sunday, which was included in the film. Bono's reference to the number of people killed in the incident was later edited for the film to reflect the actual number.

The band also gave a brief, free performance in San Francisco, California three days later on 11 November, billed as the "Save the Yuppies" concert, from which the performance of "All Along the Watchtower" was taken for the film and album. During the performance of "Sunday Bloody Sunday", Bono observed a fan holding a sign with the letters "SF" and "U2" on it. Believing the "SF" in the sign to refer to Sinn Féin, Bono reacted angrily to the fan and the sign, apparently not realizing that the "SF" more likely stood for San Francisco. Also during the performance, Bono spray painted "Stop the Traffic, Rock and Roll" on the Vaillancourt Fountain in Justin Herman Plaza, which was captured in the film. The act angered some, including then-mayor Dianne Feinstein.

At least part of the band's second concert in Fort Worth, Texas was filmed and featured in the film, as the band performed an early version of the then-unreleased song "When Love Comes to Town" with blues performer B.B. King. The band would go on to tour with King on their Lovetown Tour two years later.

Colour outdoor concert footage was taken from the band's Tempe, Arizona shows on 19 and 20 December. The initial plan was that the colour outdoor footage would have been taken during 2 shows in Buenos Aires, but during the tour planning this became impossible due to heavy costs to transport all the equipment. The shows were the final two of the tour, having been held in the same city in which the tour opened.

== Support acts ==
A number of opening acts were used for the tour. Lone Justice was still given emphasis in this role, as they had been on the Unforgettable Fire Tour, but it was not enough to give them a successful career. Other openers included the Pretenders, Big Audio Dynamite, UB40, Little Steven, BoDeans, Mason Ruffner, World Party, Stevie Ray Vaughan, Spear of Destiny, the Waterboys, Hurrah!, Los Lobos, Buckwheat Zydeco, the Pogues, the Alarm, the Silencers, Primus, and Lou Reed.

On 1 November in Indianapolis, U2 appeared as their own support act, disguised as "the Dalton Brothers", playing between sets by BoDeans and Los Lobos. They were dressed in Western outfits and wigs while Bono spoke with a twangy southern accent. Playing their own country-influenced song, "Lucille", and Leon Payne's "Lost Highway", only some of the audience in the front few rows recognised them. "The Dalton Brothers" also appeared at concerts in Los Angeles and Hampton, Virginia.

B.B. King was the opening act for both final shows of the tour on 19 and 20 December at Sun Devil Stadium in Tempe, Arizona, and in Fort Worth same year.

== Commercial performance ==
On the first North American leg of the tour, the band grossed US$7,501,329 from 465,452 tickets sold across 29 shows. For the Las Vegas show, 1,063 tickets remained unsold, equating to a 99.77% sellout for the 1st American leg. The 79 North American shows on the tour sold 2,035,539 tickets and grossed $35.1 million, making it the highest-grossing North American tour of the year.

In total, the tour grossed US$56 million and sold 3.17 million tickets.

== Set list ==
This set list is representative of the tour's average setlist as conducted by Setlist.fm, which represents all concerts for the duration of the tour.

1. "Where the Streets Have No Name"
2. "I Will Follow"
3. "I Still Haven't Found What I'm Looking For"
4. "Trip Through Your Wires"
5. "MLK"
6. "The Unforgettable Fire"
7. "Exit"
8. "Sunday Bloody Sunday"
9. "In God's Country"
10. "Gloria"
11. "Help!" (The Beatles cover)
12. "People Get Ready" (The Impressions cover)
13. "Bad"
14. "October"
15. "New Year's Day"
16. "Pride (In the Name of Love)"

Encore

17. "Bullet the Blue Sky"
18. "Running to Stand Still"
19. "With or Without You"
20. "40"

== Tour dates ==
Date	City	Country	Venue	Opening acts	Attendance	Revenue
Leg 1: North America
2 April 1987	Tempe	United States	Arizona State University Activity Center	Lone Justice	25,113 / 25,113	$389,251
4 April 1987	Tempe	United States	Arizona State University Activity Center	Lone Justice	25,113 / 25,113	$389,251
5 April 1987	Tucson	United States	Tucson Community Center	Lone Justice	8,032 / 8,032	$124,496
7 April 1987	Houston	United States	The Summit	Lone Justice	27,251 / 27,251	$368,974
8 April 1987	Houston	United States	The Summit	Lone Justice	27,251 / 27,251	$368,974
10 April 1987	Las Cruces	United States	Pan American Center	Lone Justice	12,500 / 12,500	$185,580
12 April 1987	Paradise	United States	Thomas & Mack Center	Lone Justice	8,637 / 9,700	$138,192
13 April 1987	San Diego	United States	San Diego Sports Arena	Lone Justice	27,937 / 27,937	$450,384
14 April 1987	San Diego	United States	San Diego Sports Arena	Lone Justice	27,937 / 27,937	$450,384
17 April 1987	Los Angeles	United States	Los Angeles Memorial Sports Arena	Lone Justice	74,176 / 74,176	$1,298,080
18 April 1987	Los Angeles	United States	Los Angeles Memorial Sports Arena	Lone Justice	74,176 / 74,176	$1,298,080
20 April 1987	Los Angeles	United States	Los Angeles Memorial Sports Arena	Lone Justice	74,176 / 74,176	$1,298,080
21 April 1987	Los Angeles	United States	Los Angeles Memorial Sports Arena	Lone Justice	74,176 / 74,176	$1,298,080
22 April 1987	Los Angeles	United States	Los Angeles Memorial Sports Arena	Lone Justice	74,176 / 74,176	$1,298,080
24 April 1987	Daly City	United States	Cow Palace	Lone Justice	25,785 / 25,785	$425,453
25 April 1987	Daly City	United States	Cow Palace	Lone Justice	25,785 / 25,785	$425,453
29 April 1987	Rosemont	United States	Rosemont Horizon	Lone Justice	16,854 / 16,854	$270,923
30 April 1987	Pontiac	United States	Pontiac Silverdome	Lone Justice	51,718 / 51,718	$853,347
2 May 1987	Worcester	United States	Centrum in Worcester	Lone Justice	37,482 / 37,482	$601,739
3 May 1987	Worcester	United States	Centrum in Worcester	Lone Justice	37,482 / 37,482	$601,739
4 May 1987	Worcester	United States	Centrum in Worcester	Lone Justice	37,482 / 37,482	$601,739
7 May 1987	Hartford	United States	Hartford Civic Center	Lone Justice	47,327 / 47,327	$773,632
8 May 1987	Hartford	United States	Hartford Civic Center	Lone Justice	47,327 / 47,327	$773,632
9 May 1987	Hartford	United States	Hartford Civic Center	Lone Justice	47,327 / 47,327	$773,632
11 May 1987	East Rutherford	United States	Brendan Byrne Arena	Lone Justice	102,640 / 102,640	$1,621,278
12 May 1987	East Rutherford	United States	Brendan Byrne Arena	Lone Justice	102,640 / 102,640	$1,621,278
13 May 1987	East Rutherford	United States	Brendan Byrne Arena	Lone Justice	102,640 / 102,640	$1,621,278
15 May 1987	East Rutherford	United States	Brendan Byrne Arena	Lone Justice	102,640 / 102,640	$1,621,278
16 May 1987	East Rutherford	United States	Brendan Byrne Arena	Lone Justice	102,640 / 102,640	$1,621,278
Leg 2: Europe
27 May 1987	Rome	Italy	Stadio Flaminio	The Pretenders; Big Audio Dynamite; Lone Justice	—N/a	—N/a
29 May 1987	Modena	Italy	Stadio Alberto Braglia	The Pretenders; Big Audio Dynamite; Lone Justice	—N/a	—N/a
30 May 1987	Modena	Italy	Stadio Alberto Braglia	The Pretenders; Big Audio Dynamite; Lone Justice	—N/a	—N/a
2 June 1987	London	England	Wembley Arena	Hurrah!	—N/a	—N/a
3 June 1987	Birmingham	England	National Exhibition Centre	Hurrah!	—N/a	—N/a
6 June 1987	Gothenburg	Sweden	Eriksberg	The Pretenders; Big Audio Dynamite; Lone Justice	—N/a	—N/a
12 June 1987	London	England	Wembley Stadium	The Pretenders; Spear of Destiny; World Party	—N/a	—N/a
13 June 1987	London	England	Wembley Stadium	Lou Reed; The Pogues; Lone Justice	—N/a	—N/a
15 June 1987	Paris	France	Le Zénith	Lone Justice	—N/a	—N/a
17 June 1987	Cologne	West Germany	Müngersdorfer Stadium	The Pretenders; Lou Reed; Big Audio Dynamite	—N/a	—N/a
21 June 1987	Basel	Switzerland	St. Jakob Stadium	The Pretenders; Lou Reed; Big Audio Dynamite	—N/a	—N/a
24 June 1987	Belfast	Northern Ireland	King's Hall	Lou Reed	—N/a	—N/a
27 June 1987	Dublin	Ireland	Croke Park	Lou Reed; The Pogues; The Dubliners; Light a Big Fire	—N/a	—N/a
28 June 1987	Dublin	Ireland	Croke Park	Christy Moore; The Pretenders; Lou Reed; Hothouse Flowers	—N/a	—N/a
1 July 1987	Leeds	England	Elland Road	The Pretenders; The Mission; The Fall	—N/a	—N/a
4 July 1987	Paris	France	Hippodrome de Vincennes	UB40; The Pogues	—N/a	—N/a
8 July 1987	Brussels	Belgium	Forest National	In Tua Nua	—N/a	—N/a
10 July 1987	Rotterdam	Netherlands	Feijenoord Stadion	The Pretenders; In Tua Nua	—N/a	—N/a
11 July 1987	Rotterdam	Netherlands	Feijenoord Stadion	The Pretenders; Big Audio Dynamite; In Tua Nua	—N/a	—N/a
15 July 1987	Madrid	Spain	Santiago Bernabéu Stadium	The Pretenders; UB40; Big Audio Dynamite	—N/a	—N/a
18 July 1987	Montpellier	France	Espace Richter	The Pretenders; UB40; World Party	—N/a	—N/a
21 July 1987	Munich	West Germany	Olympiahalle	In Tua Nua	—N/a	—N/a
22 July 1987	Munich	West Germany	Olympiahalle	In Tua Nua	—N/a	—N/a
25 July 1987	Cardiff	Wales	Cardiff Arms Park	The Pretenders; The Alarm; The Silencers	—N/a	—N/a
29 July 1987	Glasgow	Scotland	Scottish Exhibition and Conference Centre	Hoodoo Gurus	—N/a	—N/a
30 July 1987	Glasgow	Scotland	Scottish Exhibition and Conference Centre	Hue and Cry	—N/a	—N/a
1 August 1987	Edinburgh	Scotland	Murrayfield Stadium	The Pogues; The Mission; Love and Money; Runrig	—N/a	—N/a
3 August 1987	Birmingham	England	National Exhibition Centre	Hoodoo Gurus	—N/a	—N/a
4 August 1987	Birmingham	England	National Exhibition Centre	Hoodoo Gurus	—N/a	—N/a
8 August 1987	Cork	Ireland	Páirc Uí Chaoimh	UB40; The Subterraneans; The Dubliners	—N/a	—N/a
Leg 3: North America
10 September 1987	Uniondale	United States	Nassau Coliseum	—N/a	34,899 / 34,899	$648,603
11 September 1987	Uniondale	United States	Nassau Coliseum	—N/a	34,899 / 34,899	$648,603
12 September 1987	Philadelphia	United States	The Spectrum	—N/a	17,622 / 17,622	$323,509
14 September 1987	East Rutherford	United States	Giants Stadium	—N/a	54,780 / 54,780	$1,040,820
17 September 1987	Boston	United States	Boston Garden	—N/a	31,018 / 31,018	$589,342
18 September 1987	Boston	United States	Boston Garden	—N/a	31,018 / 31,018	$589,342
20 September 1987	Washington, D.C.	United States	Robert F. Kennedy Memorial Stadium	—N/a	51,016 / 53,056	$969,304
22 September 1987	Foxborough	United States	Sullivan Stadium	—N/a	55,378 / 55,378	$1,051,137
23 September 1987	New Haven	United States	New Haven Veterans Memorial Coliseum	—N/a	10,535 / 10,535	$177,960
25 September 1987	Philadelphia	United States	John F. Kennedy Stadium	—N/a	86,145 / 86,145	$1,593,683
28 September 1987	New York City	United States	Madison Square Garden	—N/a	39,510 / 39,510	$744,838
29 September 1987	New York City	United States	Madison Square Garden	—N/a	39,510 / 39,510	$744,838
1 October 1987	Montreal	Canada	Olympic Stadium	—N/a	66,117 / 66,117	$1,243,660
3 October 1987	Toronto	Canada	CNE Stadium	—N/a	62,846 / 62,846	$1,194,194
6 October 1987	Cleveland	United States	Cleveland Municipal Stadium	—N/a	50,081 / 50,081	$901,458
7 October 1987	Buffalo	United States	Buffalo Memorial Auditorium	—N/a	17,065 / 17,065	$298,638
9 October 1987	Syracuse	United States	Carrier Dome	—N/a	39,157 / 39,157	$685,248
11 October 1987	Rochester	United States	Silver Stadium	—N/a	30,500 / 30,500	$564,250
13 October 1987	Pittsburgh	United States	Three Rivers Stadium	—N/a	—N/a	—N/a
20 October 1987	Iowa City	United States	Carver–Hawkeye Arena	—N/a	15,846 / 15,846	$261,469
22 October 1987	Champaign	United States	Assembly Hall	BoDeans	16,193 / 16,193	$275,281
23 October 1987	Lexington	United States	Rupp Arena	—N/a	22,815 / 22,815	$387,855
25 October 1987	St. Louis	United States	St. Louis Arena	—N/a	18,237 / 18,237	$317,153
26 October 1987	Kansas City	United States	Kemper Arena	—N/a	17,168 / 17,168	$297,535
28 October 1987	Rosemont	United States	Rosemont Horizon	—N/a	51,998 / 51,998	$941,471
29 October 1987	Rosemont	United States	Rosemont Horizon	—N/a	51,998 / 51,998	$941,471
30 October 1987	Rosemont	United States	Rosemont Horizon	—N/a	51,998 / 51,998	$941,471
1 November 1987	Indianapolis	United States	Hoosier Dome	Los Lobos; The Dalton Brothers	38,441/ 38,441	$634,277
3 November 1987	Saint Paul	United States	St. Paul Civic Center	—N/a	35,152 / 35,152	$615,160
4 November 1987	Saint Paul	United States	St. Paul Civic Center	—N/a	35,152 / 35,152	$615,160
7 November 1987	Denver	United States	McNichols Arena	—N/a	34,000 / 34,000	$605,779
8 November 1987	Denver	United States	McNichols Arena	—N/a	34,000 / 34,000	$605,779
11 November 1987	San Francisco	United States	Justin Herman Plaza	—N/a	—N/a	—N/a
12 November 1987	Vancouver	Canada	BC Place Stadium	—N/a	54,204 / 54,204	$1,012,878
14 November 1987	Oakland	United States	Oakland–Alameda County Coliseum	The Pretenders; BoDeans	103,260 / 119,000	$2,013,570
15 November 1987	Oakland	United States	Oakland–Alameda County Coliseum	—N/a	103,260 / 119,000	$2,013,570
17 November 1987	Los Angeles	United States	Los Angeles Memorial Coliseum	—N/a	132,925 / 142,000	$2,590,457
18 November 1987	Los Angeles	United States	Los Angeles Memorial Coliseum	The Pretenders; The Dalton Brothers; BoDeans	132,925 / 142,000	$2,590,457
22 November 1987	Austin	United States	Frank Erwin Center	—N/a	17,202 / 17,202	$280,467
23 November 1987	Fort Worth	United States	Tarrant County Convention Center	B.B. King	27,560 / 27,560	$435,676
24 November 1987	Fort Worth	United States	Tarrant County Convention Center	B.B. King	27,560 / 27,560	$435,676
26 November 1987	Baton Rouge	United States	LSU Assembly Center	—N/a	15,042 / 15,042	$249,025
28 November 1987	Murfreesboro	United States	Charles M. Murphy Athletic Center	—N/a	11,619 / 11,619	$203,333
3 December 1987	Miami	United States	Orange Bowl	—N/a	—N/a	—N/a
5 December 1987	Tampa	United States	Tampa Stadium	—N/a	58,865 / 58,865	$1,089,003
8 December 1987	Atlanta	United States	The Omni	—N/a	32,734 / 32,734	$572,845
9 December 1987	Atlanta	United States	The Omni	—N/a	32,734 / 32,734	$572,845
11 December 1987	Hampton	United States	Hampton Coliseum	—N/a	21,088 / 21,088	$358,496
12 December 1987	Hampton	United States	Hampton Coliseum	BoDeans	21,088 / 21,088	$358,496
19 December 1987	Tempe	United States	Sun Devil Stadium	B.B. King	110,450 / 110,450	$552,340
20 December 1987	Tempe	United States	Sun Devil Stadium	B.B. King	110,450 / 110,450	$552,340
Total					1,946,920 / 1,974,838	$33,312,043

== See also ==
- List of highest-attended concerts
- List of highest-grossing concert tours
