= Running to Stand Still =

Song by U2

from the album The Joshua Tree
- Released: 9 March 1987
- Recorded: 1986
- Genre: Folk rock; acoustic blues
- Length: 4:18
- Label: Island
- Composer: U2
- Lyricist: Bono
- Producers: Daniel Lanois; Brian Eno

"Running to Stand Still" is a song by rock band U2, and it is the fifth track from their 1987 album, The Joshua Tree. A slow ballad based on piano and guitar, it describes a heroin-addicted couple living in Dublin's Ballymun flats; the towers have since become associated with the song. Though a lot of time was dedicated to the lyrics, the music was improvised with co-producer Daniel Lanois during a recording session for the album.

The group explored American music for The Joshua Tree, and as such, "Running to Stand Still" demonstrates folk rock and acoustic blues influences. The song was praised by critics, many of them calling it one of the record's best tracks. It has since been included in the regular set lists of four U2 concert tours, in two different arrangements and with several possible thematic interpretations.

== Background ==
"Running to Stand Still" was written by U2 in the context of the heroin addiction epidemic in Dublin of the 1980s, much like "Bad" (and to some extent "Wire") had been from their 1984 album The Unforgettable Fire. Bassist Adam Clayton has referred to the song as "Bad Part II". Thin Lizzy frontman Phil Lynott's decline and death from addiction also resonated with Clayton at the time.

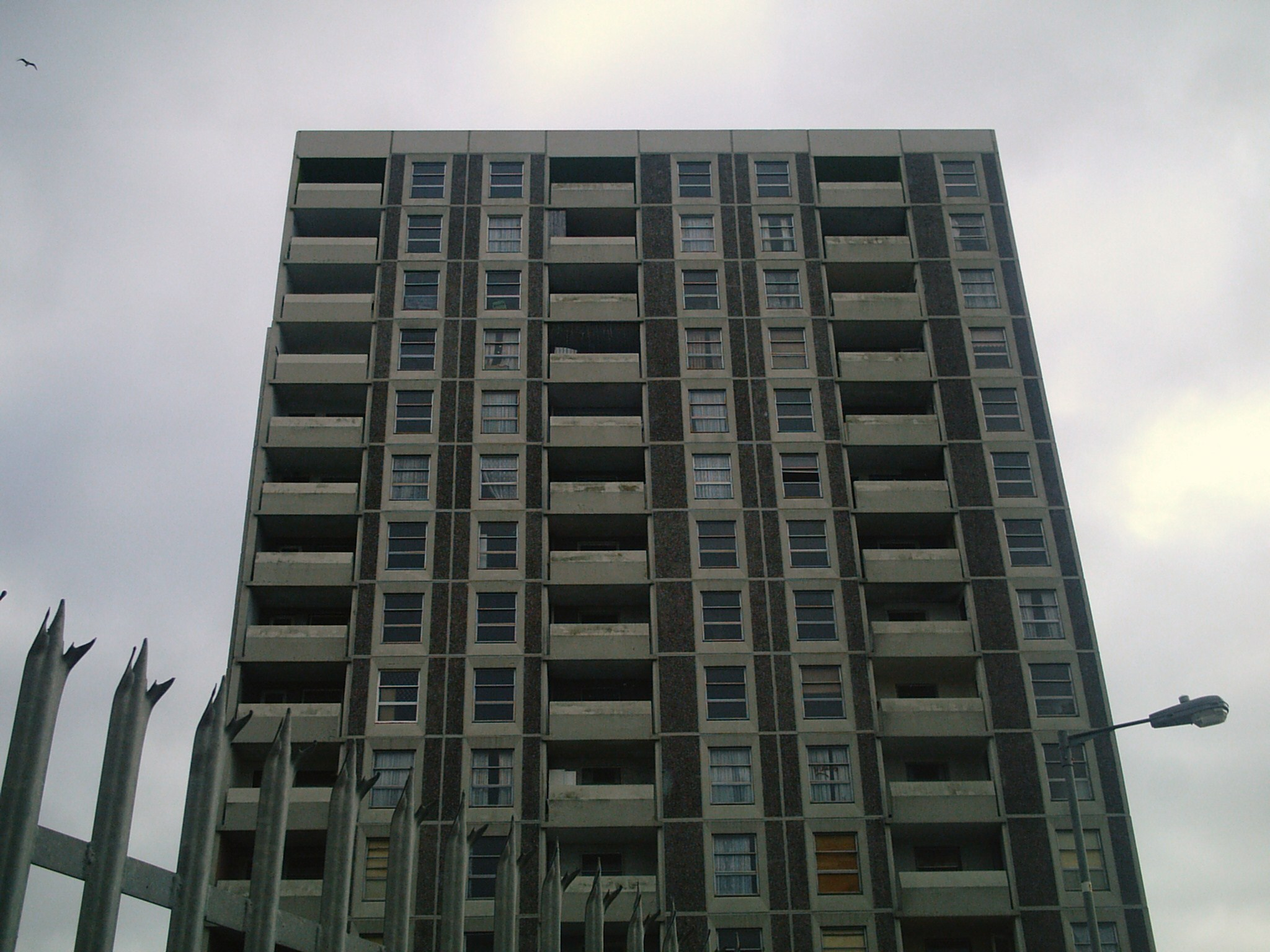
One of the seven towers in Ballymun Flats

Until their 2014 album Songs of Innocence, U2 had written relatively few songs directly related to their growing up in Dublin, often giving higher priority to works about The Troubles in Northern Ireland or to international concerns. When they have written about Dublin, allusions to it have often been disguised. But "Running to Stand Still" was one of those with specific Dublin connections:

I see seven towers
But I only see one way out

This lyric was a reference to the Ballymun flats, a group of seven local authority, high-rise residential tower blocks built in the Ballymun neighborhood of Dublin during the 1960s. Paul Hewson (later known as U2's lead vocalist Bono) had grown up on Cedarwood Road in the adjacent Glasnevin neighborhood, in a house across fields behind the towers, near his friends and future artists Fionán Hanvey (later known as Gavin Friday) and Derek Rowan (later known as Guggi). Bono had played in the towers' foundations as they were being built, then traveled in their elevators for the novel experience. Over time, poor maintenance, lack of facilities for children, transient tenancies, and other factors caused social conditions and communal ties to break down in the flats. The place began to stink of urine and vomit, and glue sniffers and used needles were common sights, as were appearances of the Garda Síochána. Guggi later lived in the towers during years that he was struggling personally with drugs. It was through his exposure to people without hope in the flats that Bono began to develop his social consciousness.

Bono may have used Ballymun as the inspiration (without any explicit lyrical references to it) for the 1980 U2 song "Shadows and Tall Trees", and later likened living in the area to some of the scenes portrayed in the 1992 Mike Newell film Into the West. Driving by there in 1987, Bono said, "See the seven tall buildings there? They're 'the seven towers.' They have the highest suicide rate in Ireland. After they discovered everywhere else in the world that you don't put people living on top of each other, we built them here."

== Writing and recording ==
"Running to the Stand Still" sample
The song combines American folk influences with lyrics about a heroin-addicted Irish couple.

The song's title phrase originated from Bono asking his brother how his struggling business was going, and the brother responding, "It's like running to stand still." Bono had not heard the phrase before, and he thought it expressed what heroin addiction and the effects of the drug on the body were like; a writer later described the title as a "perfect distillation of the dynamic of feeding on addiction." Bono had heard a real story about a pair of heroin addicts, a man and a woman, who lived in the Ballymun towers. Out of money and unable to pay the rent due to their habit, the man became a heroin smuggler, operating between Dublin and Amsterdam and taking enormous risks for a big payday. Bono felt the man was decent at heart but was constrained by his squalid living conditions, as well as poor choices, and Bono wanted to illustrate how these poor conditions affected their lives. The resulting lyric does not describe any of this explicitly, but instead limns the emotional atmosphere that the couple live in. In doing so, the song is not judgmental and shows sympathy for the woman. A character monologue from Wim Wenders' 1984 film Paris, Texas, was also a significant influence on Bono's writing of the song.

Although the lyrics of "Running to Stand Still" were worked on a great deal, the musical composition was essentially improvised by the band during the recording process. Guitarist the Edge began playing some piano chords during a session for another song. Producer Daniel Lanois joined in on guitar, and the rest of the group followed. This initial improvised version incorporated all the elements of the final song structure, and the sound and feel of the group playing in a room together without overdubs contributed to the track's effectiveness. Lou Reed's "Walk on the Wild Side" and Elton John's "Candle in the Wind", both of which had served as end snippets for "Bad" on the Unforgettable Fire Tour, were loose inspirations. The influence of Reed's works can be felt throughout the song, as can Van Morrison to an extent. Indeed, in a published tribute following Reed's 2013 death, Bono offered "Running to Stand Still" as "red-handed proof" of the influence that Reed and the Velvet Underground had had upon U2.

The Edge overdubbed the song's slide acoustic guitar, which was "amplified through a blaster", while working on guitar compositions in a lounge next to the main studio of Windmill Lane Studios. Lanois walked into the room and, impressed by the sound of the Edge's playing, wanted to record it on the spot rather than in the studio. Lanois brought the Edge headphones and plugged his guitar directly into the microphone input of the mixing console to record it. The producer said: "The blaster was amplifying his slide guitar in a lovely way. He had honed in on this sound and sort of altered the EQs and controls so that it was pleasant to him".

== Composition and interpretation ==
Much of The Joshua Tree showed the band's fascination with American culture, politics, and musical forms, and while the lyrics of "Running to Stand Still" were Irish-based, the musical arrangement for it began with touches of acoustic blues and country blues that represented an idiomatic stretch for the group. Although producer Brian Eno was known for introducing European textural music into U2's sound, he also had a strong fondness for folk and gospel music. Indeed, writers have seen echoes of Bruce Springsteen's stark acoustic 1982 album Nebraska in the song's sound.

"Running to Stand Still" is a soft, piano-based ballad played in a key of D major at a tempo of 92 beats per minute. The song follows a traditional verse-chorus form. In the introduction and conclusion is a mournful slide acoustic guitar in Eno and Lanois' production that Rolling Stone called both grim and dreamy. Most of the piano part alternates between the D and G chords, an example of the Edge's longtime practice of composing around two-chord progressions. The part gives the song an elegiac feel. Accompanying the piano for much of the song is Lanois' soft playing of a so-called electric "scrape guitar", which he contributed to add texture. Soft, echoing drums from Larry Mullen Jr., enter after the second chorus. A harmonica part from Bono takes the song to its faded conclusion. Bono's vocal range in the song runs from A_{3} to D_{6}.

In the song, the woman's addiction and misdirected desire for transcendence are reflected in lines such as "She runs through the streets / With her eyes painted red" and "She will suffer the needle chill". Bono's lyrics evoke helplessness and frustration in the lines "You've got to cry without weeping, talk without speaking, scream without raising your voice". The title phrase is not used until the last line of the song. This compositional technique relies upon delayed gratification and is heard in a few other popular songs, such as the Cure's "Just Like Heaven" and George Michael's "One More Try".

In the liner notes to the 20th anniversary reissue of The Joshua Tree, writer Bill Flanagan stated, "'Running to Stand Still' is for anyone who feels trapped in an impossible circumstance by overwhelming responsibility." Uncut magazine writer Andrew Mueller noted that the theme was effective in depicting "the drug as another bogus escape, another fraudulent promise that there's ever any evading the truth."

== Reception ==
"Running to Stand Still" earned critical praise upon The Joshua Tree's release, which itself received very favourable reviews and went on to become the group's best-selling album. Rolling Stone wrote, "After the first few times through [it], you notice the remarkable music... It sounds like a lovely, peaceful reverie – except that this is a junkie's reverie, and when that realization hits home, the gentle acoustic lullaby acquires a corrosive power." In Time magazine's 1987 cover story on the band, Jay Cocks wrote that "A U2 tune like 'Running to Stand Still', with a trancelike melody that slips over the transom of consciousness, insinuates itself into your dreams." The Uncut magazine Ultimate Music Guide to U2 described the character sketch in the song as one of Bono's best. The 1991 Trouser Press Record Guide, however, said that the song "has mood but no presence".

"Running to Stand Still" became a Dublin anthem of sorts, immortalizing the Ballymun towers. It has been considered by pop music writer Brent Mann as one of the more powerful songs written about drug addiction, joining the likes of Jefferson Airplane's 1967 "White Rabbit", Neil Young's 1972 "The Needle and the Damage Done", Martika's 1989 "Toy Soldiers", and Third Eye Blind's 1997 "Semi-Charmed Life".

Irish music writer Niall Stokes considers "Running to Stand Still" to be one of the most important songs on The Joshua Tree, not only on its own merits as a "mature and compelling... haunting, challenging piece of pop poetry", but also because its moral ambiguity and lack of condemnation of its characters presaged the chaotic direction the band would take a few years later with Achtung Baby and the Zoo TV Tour. Rolling Stone's 2003 list of "The 500 Greatest Albums of All Time" – which placed The Joshua Tree at 26th – said that while the album is remembered for the Edge's trademark guitar sounds and the group's spiritual quests, "Running to Stand Still" remains one of its most moving songs. This latter sentiment was echoed by the Irish Independent.

== Live performances ==
Throughout its live history, "Running to Stand Still" has nearly always followed "Bullet the Blue Sky", matching the order in which they appear on the album. It was first played live on the Joshua Tree Tour, with the Edge playing keyboards and Bono playing guitar, usually acoustic. During the 27 May 1987 show at Rome's Stadio Flaminio – the opener of that tour's second leg, and the first in Europe – 35,000 people sang along to the song's "Ha la la la de day" refrain, bringing a side-of-stage Brian Eno to tears. One performance of the song was captured on the 1988 filmed documentary of the tour, Rattle and Hum, but was not included on the accompanying album. A different tour performance was included on both the DVD and album Live from Paris, released in 2007. On the Lovetown Tour, during one Dublin show that was broadcast worldwide, the song segued into a verse of Ewan MacColl's classic ode to industrial bleakness, "Dirty Old Town"; this show was released in 2004 as Live from the Point Depot.

During the Zoo TV Tour, the song's performance was significantly altered. In these shows, the Edge played guitar on his Fender Stratocaster with the band on the main stage, while Bono sang the song on the B-stage with a headset microphone. Bono mimed the actions of a heroin addict, rolling up his sleeves and then pretending to spike his arm during the final lyric, after which he would sing "Hallelujah" over and over while reaching up into a pillar of white light. Writer Robyn Brothers sees the addition of the "Hallelujah" coda as indicating that while organized religion may act in the role of a sedative, a notion akin to other Zoo TV themes, the role of personal faith may still have a "desiring, affirming, and 'deterritorializing' force." At the culmination of the "Bullet the Blue Sky" to "Running to Stand Still" sequence, red and yellow smoke flares ignited at either end of the stage (an idea of U2's security chief, who was a U.S. Vietnam veteran), as the coda segued into "Where the Streets Have No Name". This arrangement and performance of "Running to Stand Still" was included in the 1994 concert film Zoo TV: Live from Sydney.

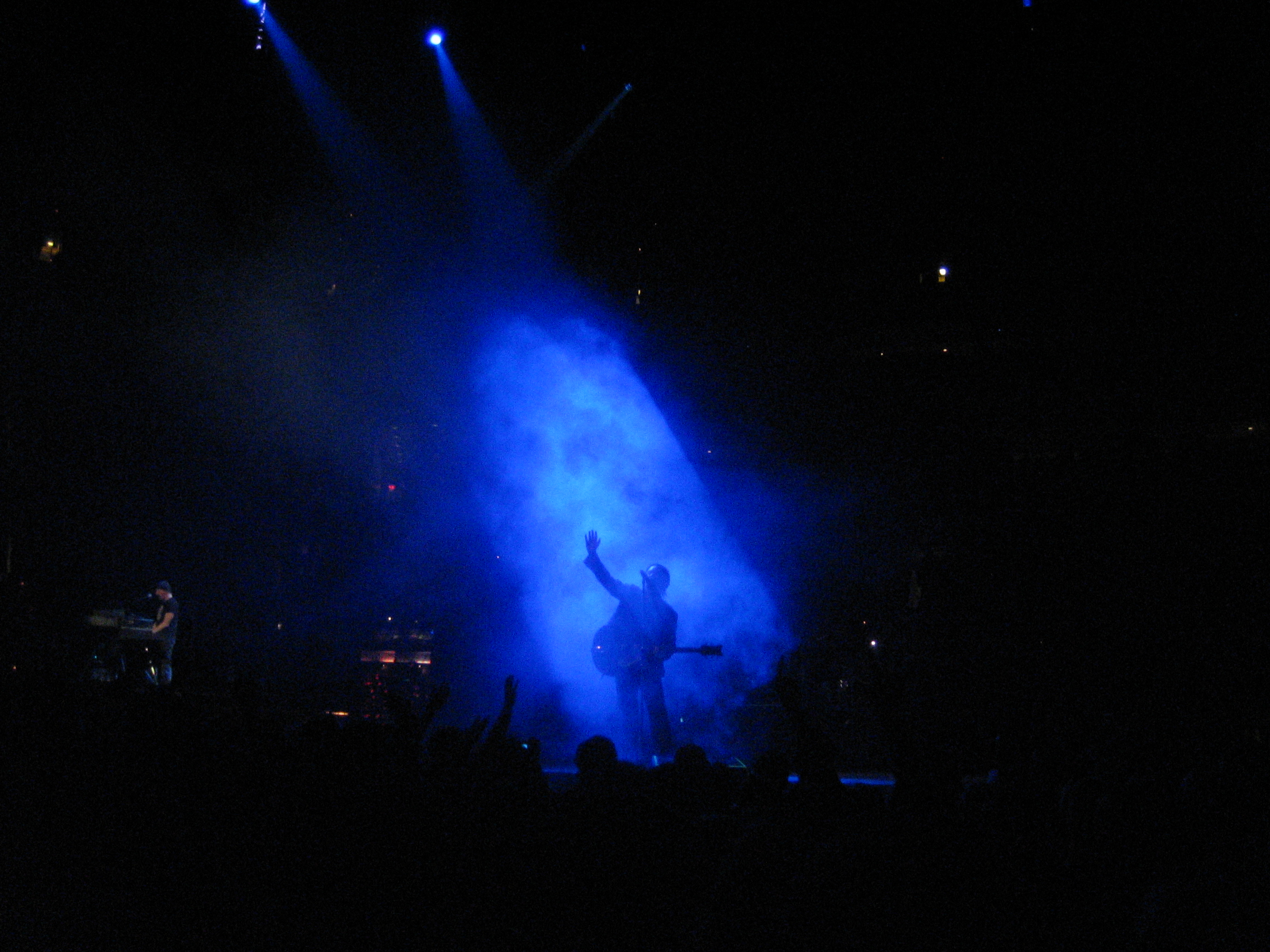
The Edge on piano and Bono on guitar as "Running to Stand Still" is performed in 2005 on the Vertigo Tour

"Running to Stand Still" was not played on the PopMart Tour or Elevation Tour, but it returned to U2 concerts on the 2005 Vertigo Tour, with the original combination of the Edge on keyboards and Bono on guitar. During most of its performance on the Vertigo Tour, it once again followed "Bullet the Blue Sky" and culminated with a video clip of several articles of the Universal Declaration of Human Rights being read. (After July 2005, it was replaced in that role and in the set list by "Miss Sarajevo".) During the 19 June 2005 show on Burmese democracy leader Aung San Suu Kyi's birthday, "Running to Stand Still" included snippets of "Walk On", a song originally written for her. Author Steve Stockman felt that in this tour's uses, "Running to Stand Still" was one of the band's songs from the 1980s that had lost its original meaning and was no longer about drug-dealing in the Ballymun towers. Rather, it was now being used to develop the show's theme that a belief in faith and in human potential could overcome the bleakest and most desperate situations; in this, it fit within the Vertigo Tour's emphasis on coexistence and the ONE Campaign. This assessment agreed to by an eFestivals review, and author John Jobling has called the new interpretation an "anti-persecution paean" that was used to remove the sting of "Bullet the Blue Sky" being used to criticize American behavior during the Iraq War. In contrast, USA Today's veteran rock writer Edna Gundersen found the song's performance still established a "devastating" mood and the New York Daily News said that the group "thinned 'Running To Stand Still' to give it a new mourning". Two other U.S. reviewers remarked that the song was lesser known to audiences, with Variety saying its inclusion helped the band connect with the past while avoiding cliché. One tour performance of "Running to Stand Still" was included on the Vertigo 2005: Live from Chicago DVD, during which Bono dedicated the Hallelujah coda to members of the American and British militaries fighting overseas. The song was not performed during the U2 360° Tour, with The Vancouver Sun bemoaning the absence of this "stone-cold classic of the U2 canon".

== Legacy ==
Future music video director Dave Meyers wrote a movie script to the song while a film student at Loyola Marymount University. The 2004 first-season episode "Running to Stand Still" of the U.S. television series Desperate Housewives was named after the song. It featured the Lynette Scavo character resorting to taking her children's ADD medication in order to cope with the overwhelming demands of her domestic life. A fifth-season episode of the U.S. television series One Tree Hill, itself named after a U2 song, was called "Running to Stand Still".

By mid-2000s, the Ballymun towers were in the process of being torn down, and the Ballymun area was the target of a €1.8 billion regeneration scheme intended to create a self-sustaining community of 30,000 people that would be more successful than the original 1960s plan. Despite their failure as housing, the towers had left a long cultural legacy, of which "Running to Stand Still" was the first and perhaps best-known exemplar; the link between the towers and the song was mentioned in some tourist books about Dublin. Former towers residents were not always happy with the song. Lynn Connolly, whose 2006 memoir The Mun: Growing Up in Ballymun detailed her raising there in the 1970s and 1980s, readily acknowledged the problems there and also wanted to get out at the time. But she later came to realize that there had been much that was good at the towers – in terms of a collective wit among residents and a helping sense of community – which had been ignored by the media. She thus wrote, "regardless of what U2 say in their song, 'Running to Stand Still', there was certainly more than one way out." In a newspaper interview, Connolly suggested that the song might have had a deleterious effect: "It doesn't take a lot of imagination to picture an unemployed person, living alone in a flat in Ballymun, listening to that song and agreeing with what their hero was saying." She further noted that some websites erroneously state that Bono grew up in Ballymun itself, and said, "Perhaps it gave him a sort of street-cred to associate himself with the estate he could see from his bedroom window in nice, safe, respectable Cedarwood Road in Glasnevin."

The Ballymun area was still so associated with "Running to Stand Still" and the drug problem of the time, that local backers of the regeneration went to pains to point out the recent progress. A Bono remark that it was dangerous to walk in Ballymun at night found a good deal of publicity. A fansite listing U2-related Dublin area sights in 2004 mentioned Ballymun's connection to the song, cautioning, "do not go here on foot – this is a bad area". U2's official website noted that the area was much changed now; Bono himself said "he's very proud to come from the Ballymun area"; the fansite subsequently modified its listing and said an on-foot visit to Ballymun was warranted.

== See also ==
- List of covers of U2 songs - Running to Stand Still
