= Hippodrome de Vincennes =

Horse racing track in Paris, France

Coordinates: 48°49′26″N 2°27′5″E

- "Temple of Trot"
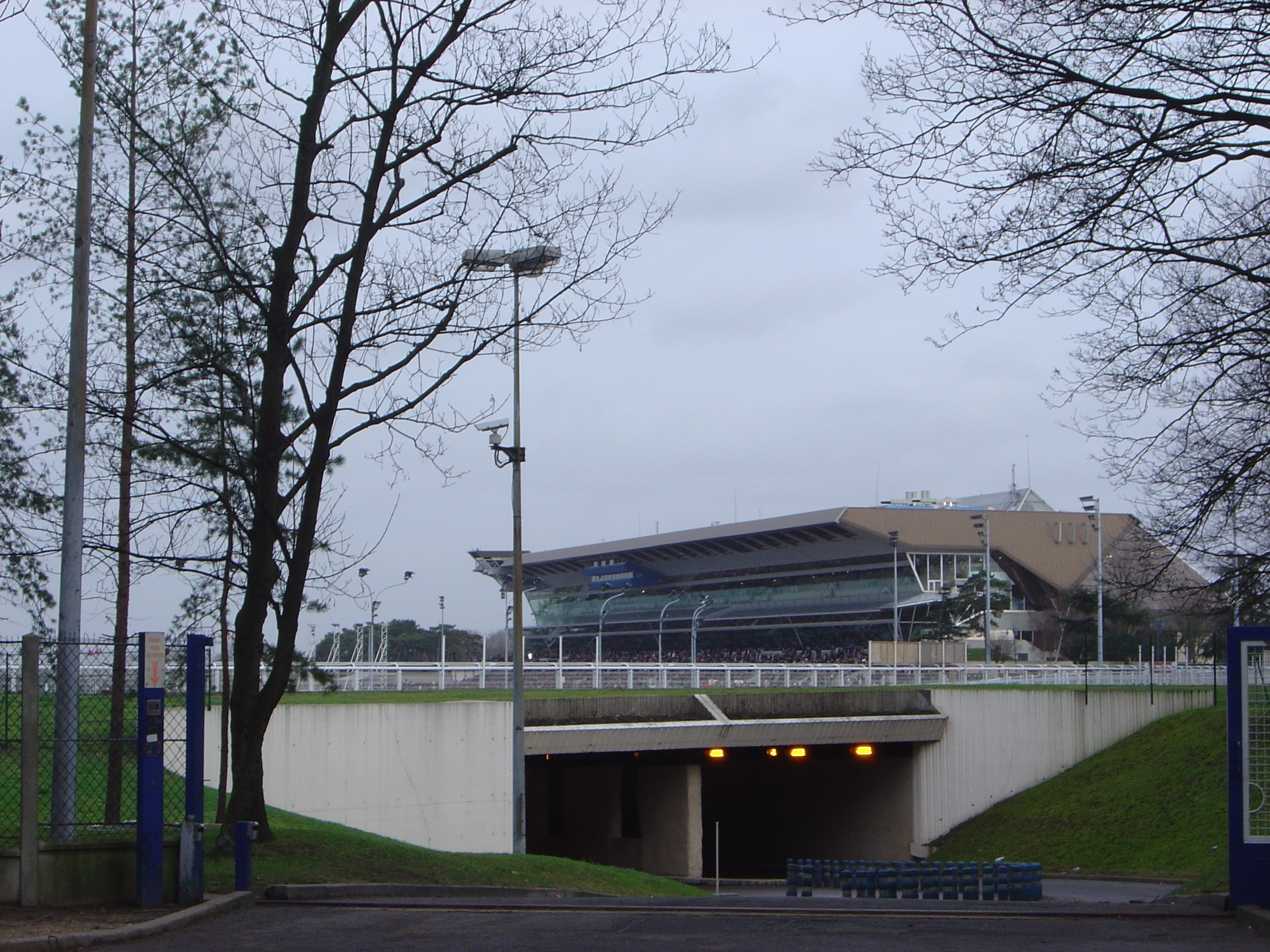
- Interactive map of Hippodrome de Vincennes
- Address: 2 Route De La Ferme, 75012; Paris; France
- Owner: Société d'encouragement à l'élevage du trotteur français
- Capacity: 35,000
- Event: Harness racing
- Screen: 160m² giant screen
- Field shape: 2,000-meter outdoor track
- Acreage: 42 hectares (100 acres)
- Current use: 152 meetings and 1,265 races (2025)
- Public transit: Joinville-le-Pont station

Construction
- Opened: March 1863
- Reopened: 1879

Tenants
- Dining: Le Panoramique, Café Casaques and Heat Bar

Website
- https://www.vincennes-hippodrome.com/fr/

Tracks of the hippodrome

The Hippodrome de Vincennes, also called Vincennes Racecourse, is a horse racing track located in Paris, France. It has a spectator capacity of 35,000. It was created in 1863 and rebuilt in 1879, after being destroyed in the Franco-Prussian War.

The venue sits on 42 hectares and includes two tracks, one large and one smaller one for night races. The venue can accommodate 35,000 spectators and has stabling for 150 horses.

== History ==
Racing at Vincennes began on the plateau de Gravelle, where jump races were held between 1863 and 1870. For the trotting races staged during the Exposition universelle of 1878, the Chamber of Deputies voted an extraordinary credit of 60,000 francs, and Léon Gambetta intervened to secure the former Gravelle course for the Société d'encouragement pour l'amélioration du cheval français de demi-sang, the body that became Le Trot.

The Parisian public took time to come. With Auteuil and Longchamp holding the capital's Sundays, trotting meetings were confined to weekdays. Only after the society moved its offices to Paris in 1903 and obtained additional winter fixtures (Sunday dates, when the flat horses were resting or wintering at Nice and Pau), did the course fill. Thirty-eight meetings were held there in 1913.

The first Prix d'Amérique was run at Vincennes on 1 February 1920; no foreign-trained horse won it until 1931.

The Second World War interrupted that history. The race was renamed the Grand Prix d'hiver, and from 1945 to 1947 it was run at Enghien, the Vincennes course having been requisitioned by American troops as a store for military equipment. Racing resumed at Vincennes on 17 November 1947, once the Americans had cleared the ground, and the Prix d'Amérique returned to a restored course in 1948.

Night racing was introduced on Friday 20 June 1952, the daytime programme having become too small for fields that passed three thousand runners in the course of the decade.

New stands were inaugurated on 9 January 1983. They were built around a great hall able to take the 40,000 spectators of a Prix d'Amérique.

== Harness racing ==
The venue was originally open to all types of horse racing. On 26 November 1934, the last steeplechase race took place, afterwards which the racetrack was devoted exclusively to mounted trotters and harness racing.

Vincennes has the largest trotting programme of any French racecourse. In 2025 it staged 152 meetings and 1,265 races (946 in harness racing and 319 in mounted trotting) and distributed €72.0 million in prize money, an average of €56,946 a race. Of the 29 races classified Group 1 by Le Trot that year, 26 were run at Vincennes.

== Events venue ==
The figures given for the racecourse vary with what is being staged, and they are not comparable with one another. The operator gives a spectator capacity of 35,000. For the Prix d'Amérique the crowd is put higher: the stands opened in 1983 were built around a great hall able to take the 40,000 spectators of that day. Concerts use the infield, which holds more again: in June 1993, two days before U2 played there, Le Monde reported that the lawn could take 80,000 people and that the promoter expected 65,000.

It has also been used for concerts, hosting:

- Pink Floyd - 12 September 1970
- Grateful Dead - 17 October 1981
- Queen - 14 June 1986, with Belouis Some, Level 42 and Marillion
- Genesis - 3 June 1987, with Paul Young
- U2 - 4–5 July 1987 and 26 June 1993, with Belly and The Velvet Underground. The first date, was filmed and recorded for the live home video and album, Live from Paris.
- Bruce Springsteen & The E Street Band - 19 June 1988, Tunnel of Love Express Tour
- Whitesnake - 1 September 1990
- AC/DC - 21 September 1991
- Guns N' Roses - 6 June 1992 (Pay-per-view concert with Steven Tyler, and Joe Perry (musician) from Aerosmith, and Lenny Kravitz guest appearing); Le Monde put the crowd at around forty thousand
- Elton John - 18 June 1992
- Michael Jackson - 13 September 1992; the tour's official site gives an attendance of 85,000
- Metallica - 13 June 1993, with The Cult and Suicidal Tendencies

== See also ==
- Horse racing in France
- List of horse racecourses in France
- Le Trot
