= Bullet the Blue Sky =

Song by U2

from the album The Joshua Tree
- Released: 9 March 1987
- Recorded: 1986
- Genre: Post-punk
- Length: 4:32
- Label: Island
- Composer: U2
- Lyricist: Bono
- Producers: Daniel Lanois; Brian Eno

"Bullet the Blue Sky" is a song by Irish rock band U2, and is the fourth track from their 1987 album The Joshua Tree. Lyrically, the song was inspired by a trip that lead vocalist Bono made to Nicaragua and El Salvador, where he saw firsthand how local peasants were affected by United States military intervention in the region. Angered by what he witnessed, Bono asked guitarist the Edge to "put El Salvador through an amplifier." "Bullet the Blue Sky" is one of the band's most overtly political songs, with live performances often being heavily critical of political conflicts and violence.

== Writing and recording ==
"Bullet the Blue Sky" first originated as a demo that U2 recorded during a jam session at STS Studios in Dublin with producer Paul Barrett, prior to the proper Joshua Tree recording sessions. While listening to a song by English rock band the Fall, U2 guitarist the Edge tried to emulate its guitar riff, but instead came up with his own part that was, in his approximation, "uptempo, like real hard-hitting". It eventually became the chorus for "Bullet the Blue Sky". Bassist Adam Clayton and drummer Larry Mullen Jr. then joined in playing at half-time. Lead vocalist Bono recalled that Clayton was also playing in a different key from the Edge, who became irritated and considered stopping the jam. After the take was completed, the band listened to playback in the control room and realised that the demo was "absolutely brilliant". Compared to the final version of the song, the Edge described the demo as "much more bare-boned, like a heavy funk track". Still, the song was discarded for some time until producer Brian Eno, who described it as a "homeless riff", convinced the band it was worth working on.

In July 1986, Bono and his wife Ali Hewson travelled to Nicaragua and El Salvador, where they saw firsthand the distress of peasants bullied by political conflicts and United States military intervention. The trip angered Bono and formed the basis of the song's lyrics. He said, "I remember the ground shaking, and I remember the smell, I suppose, of being near a war zone. I don't think we were in danger, but I knew there were lives in danger or being lost close to us, and I felt for them. It upset me as a person who read the Scriptures, to think that Christians in America were supporting this kind of thing, this kind of proxy war because of these Communists." In August, after reconvening with his bandmates in Dublin to resume work on The Joshua Tree, Bono instructed the Edge to "put El Salvador through an amplifier", resulting in the song's feedback-based guitar part. The Edge said that his guitar playing was also informed by Bono's lyrics.

Producer Daniel Lanois says that the most progress on "Bullet the Blue Sky" was made at Melbeach, the Edge's newly purchased home in seaside Monkstown. According to Lanois, the song's performance came from a 20-minute jam that he dedicated an extensive amount of time to editing into a final arrangement, "for a song that was never a song, that was only ever a jam." He said, "It was one of those songs that was born partially by surgery – the editing of the structure was a really big part of it." Recording engineer Dave Meegan helped develop the song with a mix that he made at Melbeach. Wanting it to sound like Led Zeppelin, Meegan adjusted a monitor mix to make it "really heavy sounding." Lanois was inspired by what he heard, as the song up to that point was being treated softly. He quickly summoned the band, who went with the primary engineer Flood to Windmill Lane Studios. In a warehouse next door to the studio, the crew used a public address system to play a recording of Mullen's drums, which was then re-recorded inside the warehouse. Lanois called it a "really elaborate kind of rock and roll chamber". The result, according to Meegan, "made [the drums] sound like John Bonham", while Lanois said they sounded "tankier". He added, "it introduced a mid-range that the high-hat seemed to like. This new sonic emphasis on the high-hat made every hit more relevant... The inherent low-frequency punch of the PA also added a level of excitement to the bass drum. The overall sensation was a chestier one."

The final mix of "Bullet the Blue Sky" was based on two different versions. Producer Steve Lillywhite, who in December 1986 was hired by U2 to help mix some of The Joshua Tree, was asked by the Edge "to fly over from one version to another version". Lillywhite had to match the tempos of the two tape recordings by hand and then, during playback, transfer the requested sections of each onto a half-inch tape recorder. He said it "was never all played at the same time; it was a real mish-mash of two things." Lanois said Lillywhite's final mix was much different from his and Eno's version, leaning more heavily on effects and overdubs: "I wouldn't have had as many effects on it, because we had a bit of a purist attitude toward some of these recordings, essentially that there was a sound that was captured in performance in a room, and we wanted to remain loyal to that space, to convey that sound. And he was not as sentimental to that idea, so he pulled out all the stops."

During a spoken word passage of the song, Bono speaks of being approached by a man, "his face red like a rose on a thorn bush, like all the colours of a royal flush, and he's peeling off those dollar bills, slapping them down, 100, 200". Bono said the person he had in mind while writing the lyrics was then US President Ronald Reagan, whose administration backed the military regimes in Central and South America that Bono encountered on his earlier trip. The lyrics were partially inspired by Bono seeing a mural in El Salvador of Reagan in a chariot depicted as the Pharaoh, with Salvadorans as "the children of Israel running away".

== Live performances ==
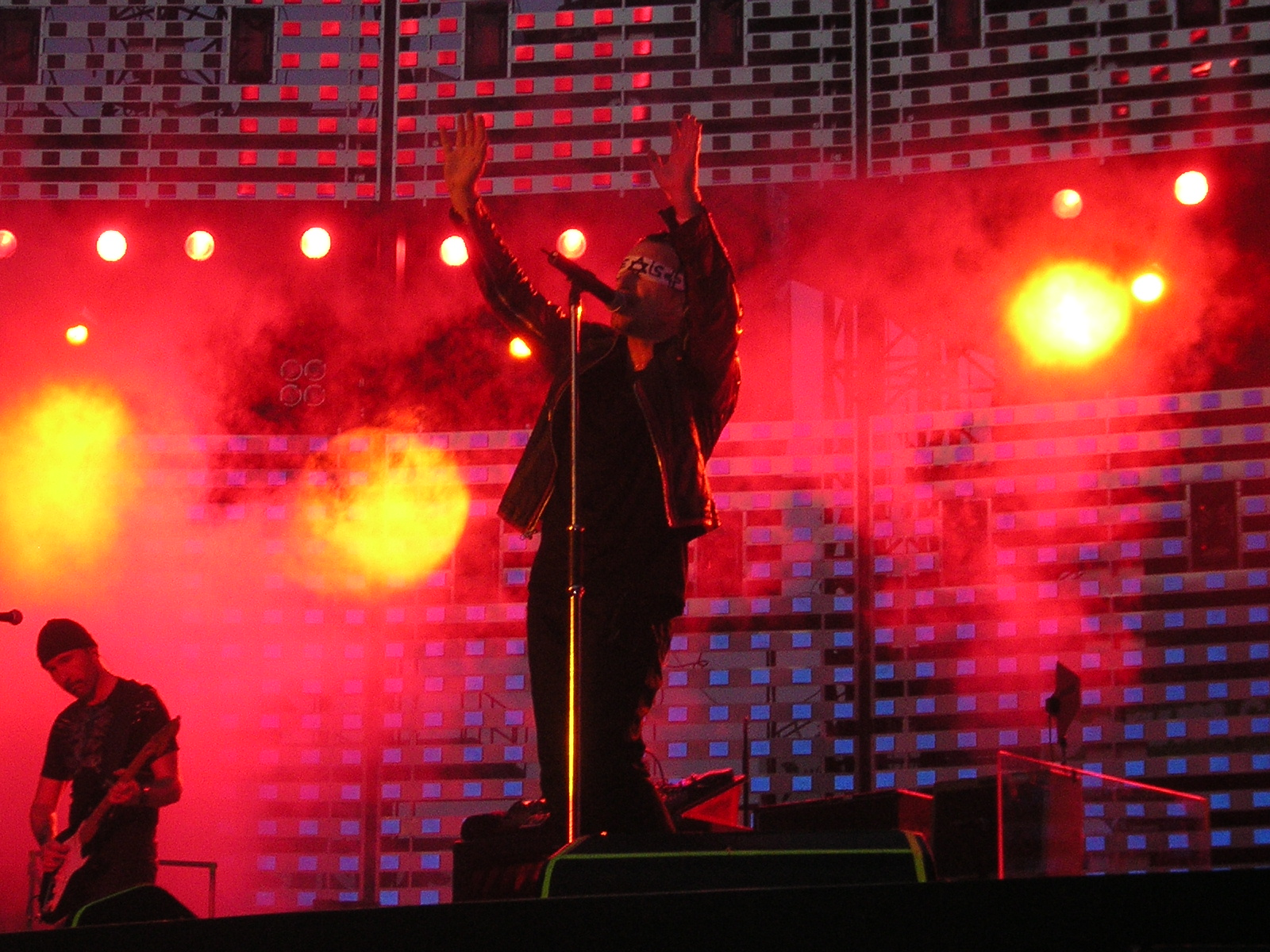
A performance of the song on the Vertigo Tour, when the band re-interpreted it as a commentary on religious violence.

"Bullet the Blue Sky" was played at nearly every live concert from its first performance at the opening night of the Joshua Tree Tour on 2 April 1987 through the Vertigo Tour. Its live performances have traditionally been paired with "Running to Stand Still"; this took place on the Joshua Tree Tour, Lovetown Tour, Zoo TV Tour, and the first 46 concerts of the Vertigo Tour. On the PopMart Tour, "Bullet" instead led into "Please"; Elevation Tour performances were followed by "With or Without You" or a cover of "What's Going On" by Marvin Gaye; on the Vertigo Tour, "Miss Sarajevo" replaced "Running to Stand Still" for the last 85 concerts. and on the Innocence + Experience Tour, it segued into "Pride (In the Name of Love)" on the first leg and an abbreviated version of "Zooropa" starting on the second leg.

During the Joshua Tree Tour, Bono would frequently grab a large spotlight and shine into peoples' faces in the audience, and would also make numerous political references to figures such as Ronald Reagan and Jerry Falwell. He also used the spotlight on the Elevation Tour. On the Innocence + Experience Tour, Bono would typically sing the majority of the song into a megaphone.

U2's following album, Rattle and Hum, featured a live performance of this song, with a pre-recorded intro of Jimi Hendrix's version of "The Star-Spangled Banner". "Bullet" then took on new meanings throughout the subsequent years. On the Zoo TV Tour, it was about Nazism; on the PopMart Tour, it, at least on occasion, featured references to consumerism and rock iconography in keeping in with the tour's theme. On the Elevation Tour, it became an indictment against handgun violence, illustrated by references to John Lennon's assassination and an ironic intro video clip featuring Charlton Heston, who was at that time the president of the National Rifle Association, while on the Vertigo Tour, it was about religious violence and the final lyrics were replaced by a snippet of "The Hands That Built America". On the Innocence + Experience Tour, the song was about corruption of money, which was emphasized with images of Wall Street and Las Vegas on the video screen, as well as Bono discussing a scenario where he meets a teenage version of himself who criticizes the wealthy man he has become.

The Edge uses his black Fender Stratocaster to play this song, except during the PopMart Tour, when he used a Gibson Les Paul.

Live performances of the song appear on the concert films Zoo TV: Live from Sydney (1994), PopMart: Live from Mexico City (1998), Elevation 2001: Live from Boston, U2 Go Home: Live from Slane Castle, Ireland (2003), Vertigo 2005: Live from Chicago, Live from Paris (2007) and Innocence + Experience: Live in Paris (2016).

== Personnel ==
Personnel taken from The Joshua Tree liner notes, except where noted. (Note: The band members' instruments are not credited on the album's liner notes, aside from the Edge's backing vocals and Bono's harmonica. Their primary instruments are listed based on their accounts of the album's recording and their de facto primary roles in the group.)

U2

- Bono – lead vocals
- The Edge – guitars, backing vocals
- Adam Clayton – bass guitar
- Larry Mullen Jr. – drums

Technical

- Daniel Lanois – production
- Brian Eno – production
- Flood – recording
- Dave Meegan – additional engineering
- Pat McCarthy – additional engineering
- Steve Lillywhite – mixing
- Mark Wallis – mix engineering
- Mary Kettle – assistant mix engineering

== Reception and cover versions ==
In 2004, Mojo placed the song at number 17 on its list of the "100 Epic Rock Tracks". The September 2018 issue of Q included the song on a list of the "50 Greatest Revolutionary Songs"; writer Niall Doherty said, "It's no little irony that it became the most powerful song on the album that made U2 stars in America, Bono serving up this tale of the horrors of US foreign policy to packed stadiums, night after night."

The U2 Podcast Editions in iTunes mentions that this is Paul McGuinness' (former U2 manager) favorite song.

The song is covered by Sepultura in their 2002 covers EP Revolusongs, by P.O.D. on their 1999 album The Fundamental Elements of Southtown and Queensrÿche in their 2007 album Take Cover.

== Charts ==
Chart (1987)	Peak position
US Billboard Album Rock Tracks	14

== See also ==
- List of anti-war songs
- List of covers of U2 songs – "Bullet the Blue Sky"
- Ronald Reagan in music
