= Timeline of U2 =

This is a timeline of the history of rock band U2:

== Pre-1976 ==
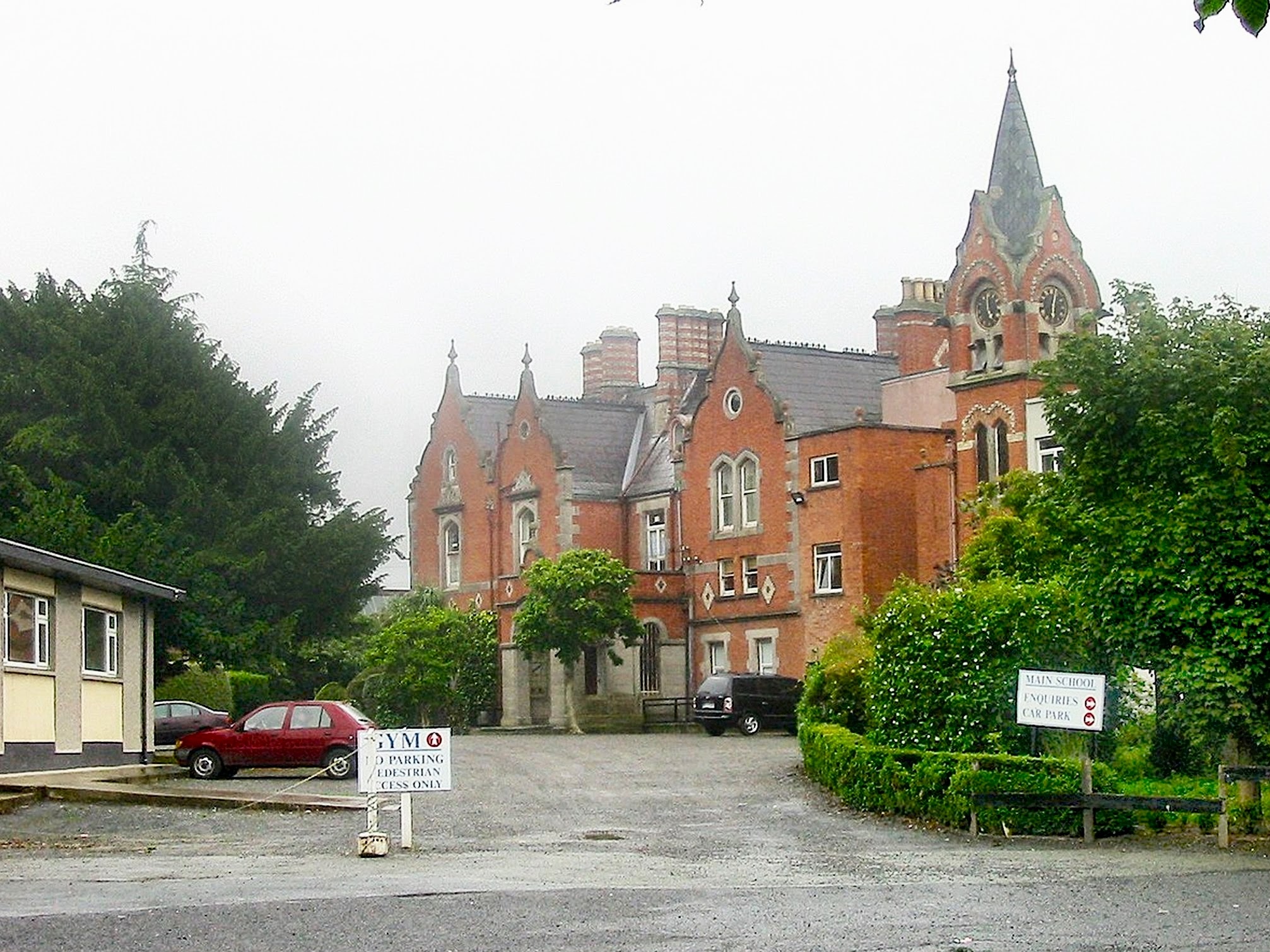
Mount Temple Comprehensive School where Larry Mullen Jr. posted a notice looking for musicians to form a band.

- 13 March 1960: Adam Clayton is born in Chinnor, Oxfordshire.
- 10 May 1960: Paul David Hewson (Bono) is born in Dublin.
- 8 August 1961: David Howell Evans (The Edge) is born in Essex.
- 31 October 1961: Larry Mullen Jr. is born in Artane, Dublin.
- 10 September 1974: Bono's mother, Iris Hewson, dies of a brain aneurysm in Dublin four days after collapsing at her father's funeral.
- Autumn: Paul Hewson and his neighbourhood friends form the "Lypton Village," in which they create their own language, dress differently, and put on art installations. The group nicknames Hewson Bono after a Dublin hearing aid store.

== 1976 ==
- 25 September: The band that will become U2 forms in Dublin after Mullen posts a notice seeking musicians for a new band on the Mount Temple Comprehensive School notice board. Attending the first practice are Mullen (playing drums), The Edge and his older brother Dik Evans (playing guitar), the Evans brothers' friend Adam Clayton (playing bass guitar), Bono (performing lead vocals), and Mullen's friends Ivan McCormick and Peter Martin.
- September: The band name themselves "Feedback" because it was one of the few technical terms they knew.
- Autumn: Martin leaves the band after the first practice, and McCormick leaves within a few weeks.
- Late 1976: Feedback give their first public performance at a talent contest held in the school canteen.

== 1977 ==
- April: Feedback play their first gig for a paying audience at St. Fintan's High School.
- April: Feedback change their name to "The Hype".

== 1978 ==
- February: The Hype record a performance of "The Fool" for the RTÉ programme, Our Times.
- March: The Our Times performance airs, marking the band's first television appearance.
- 4 March: The band played their last concert as The Hype at Presbyterian Hall in Sutton. During the performance, Dik Evans ceremonially leaves the stage, and the remaining four members play a set as "U2".
- 18 March: As a four-piece playing under the name "U2", the band win a talent show in Limerick, Ireland. The prize is £500 and studio time to record a demo for CBS Ireland.
- 28 April: Bill Graham publishes his first interview with U2 in Hot Press.
- April: U2 record their first demo tape at Keystone Studios, Dublin.

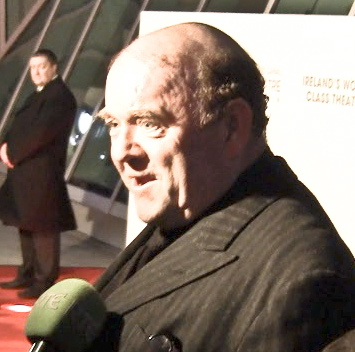
Paul McGuiness (pictured in 2010) became manager of the band in 1978

- 25 May 1978: Paul McGuinness agrees to become U2's manager.
- 9 September 1978: U2 play in support of The Stranglers at the Top Hat Ballroom, their biggest gig to date. They are paid £50.
- November 1978: Mullen's mother, Maureen Mullen, is killed in a car accident.
- December 1978: U2 play in support of The Greedy Bastards, a band made up of members of Sex Pistols, Thin Lizzy, and Boomtown Rats, at the Stardust nightclub in Dublin.

== 1979 ==
- February: Using borrowed money, Bono travels to London to plug U2 at the offices of record companies and music magazines.
- May: U2 play the first of six-afternoon concerts at the Dandelion Market in Dublin. Organised for young people prohibited from the venues U2 normally play, the concerts greatly expand their Dublin audience.
- September: U2's first release, an Ireland-only EP entitled Three, becomes the band's first Irish chart success.
- 5 October: U2 play their first television performance on RTÉ at a televised concert at the Cork Opera House.
- 26 October: U2 are featured on the cover of Hot Press magazine.
- 1 November: U2 receive their first cover story outside Ireland in British magazine Record Mirror.
- 1 December: With £3,000 borrowed from family and friends, U2 begin a two-week tour of London clubs, their first shows outside Ireland.

== 1980 ==
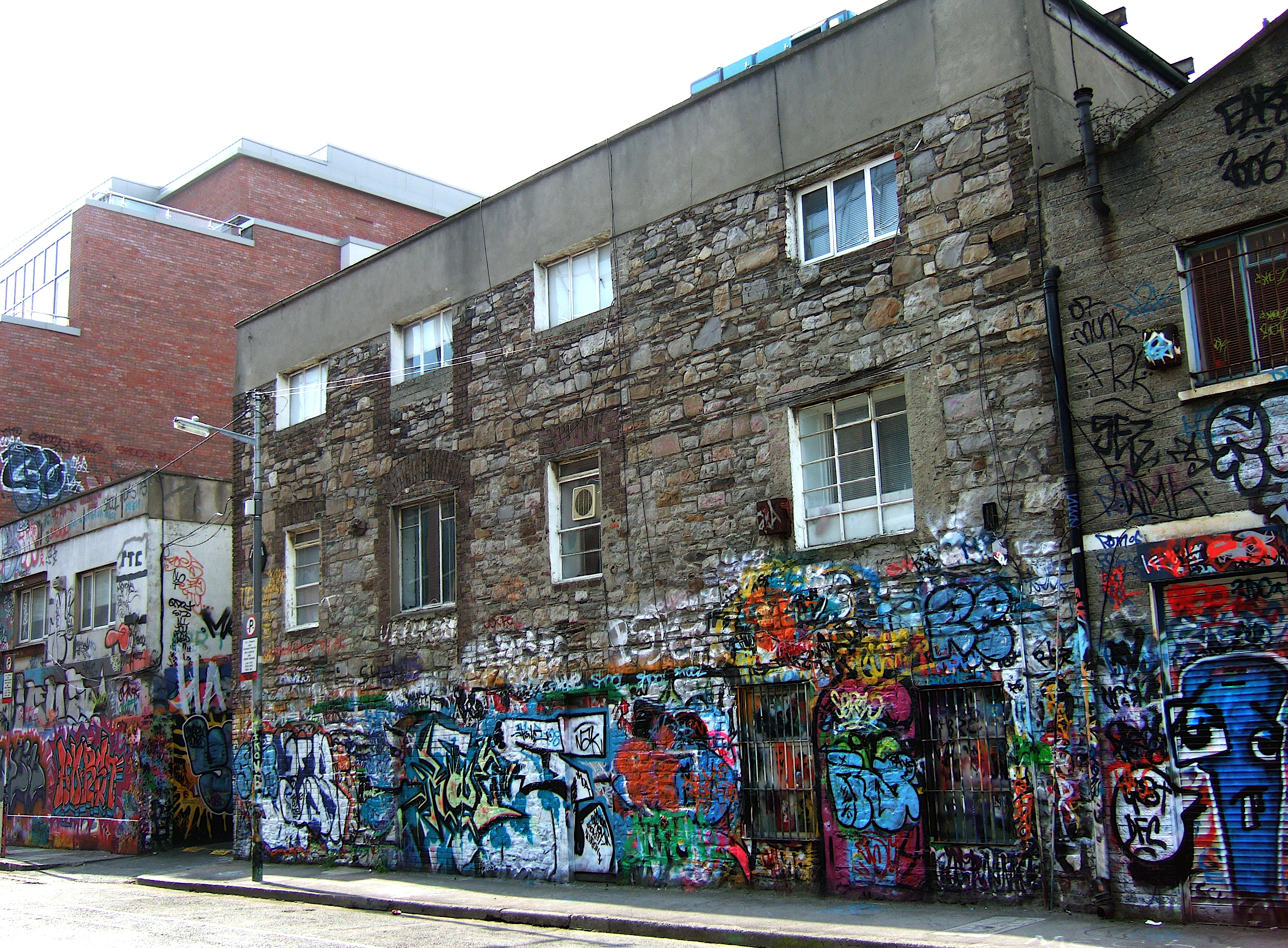
Windmill Lane Studios where U2 recorded their first album

- 15 January: U2 perform "Stories for Boys" live on The Late Late Show.
- 26 February: U2's second single, "Another Day", is released on the CBS label for the Irish market only.
- 19 March: U2 share the bill with Berlin and The Virgin Prunes at the Sense of Ireland festival. Record company executives are present.
- 23 March: U2 sign an international deal with Island Records.
- March – September: The band record their first album at Windmill Lane Studios.
- 23 May: "11 O'Clock Tick Tock" is released in Ireland, and as the band's first internationally released single, in the UK.
- 27 July: U2 play their first open-air festival to an audience of 15,000 at Leixlip Castle in Kildare. The Police top the bill which includes Squeeze and Q-Tips.
- August: "A Day Without Me" is released as a single.
- 6 September – 4 December: The band play a 57-date tour of Europe.
- 27 September: U2 support Echo and the Bunnymen in London's Lyceum Ballroom.
- October: "I Will Follow" is released as a single and peaks at number 20 on the Mainstream Rock charts.
- 14 October: The band play to a small audience in KRO Studios in Hilversum, The Netherlands. The show is broadcast the following day to coincide with the following day's first mainland European concert.
- 15 October: U2 play their first continental Europe gig at Melkweg ("The Milkyway") in Amsterdam.
- 19 October: U2 play the Lyceum Ballroom, opening for Slade with the hardcore punk fame Discharge and Last Words.
- 20 October: The band's debut album, Boy, is released in Ireland and the United Kingdom. It peaks at No. 52 on the British charts.
- 6 December: U2 play their first American concert at The Ritz in New York City as part of a 14-date tour.
- 9 December: U2 perform their debut concert in Canada the day after John Lennon's death. The angry and emotional performance receives glowing reviews in Canadian media.

== 1981 ==
- 24 January – 28 February: U2 play dates in the United Kingdom and play their first tour of continental Europe.
- 3 March: Boy is released in the United States.
- 3 March – 31 May: U2 commence their first major tour of the United States playing almost 60 dates across the country largely in clubs.
- 4 June: U2 make their American television debut on The Tomorrow Show to promote the Boy album. Bono and the Edge are interviewed briefly by host Tom Snyder and the band plays "I Will Follow" and an incomplete version of "Twilight" during the credits
- July: The single "Fire" is released.
- July – August: The band record their second album at Windmill Lane Studios, in Dublin. The sessions are complicated after the briefcase containing Bono's lyrics was lost earlier in the year during a show in Portland, Oregon.
- 5 October: "Gloria" is released as a single and makes the UK charts. The video for "Gloria" is directed by Meiert Avis and shot in the Canal Basin in Dublin.
- 12 October: The band's second album, October, is released. During the album's recording sessions, Bono and The Edge left the band due to spiritual conflicts, and U2 ceased to exist for a brief period of time. The album received mixed reviews and limited radio play. It enters the UK charts at number 11.

== 1982 ==
- March: The single "A Celebration" is released.
- 18 July: U2 support Rory Gallagher at Punchestown Racecourse festival where acts such as Simple Minds and Phil Lynott were also on the bill.
- 31 August: Bono marries high school sweetheart, Alison Stewart, in Raheny, Dublin. They honeymoon in Jamaica where Bono reportedly works on the lyrics for the new album.
- 1 December: The pre-War Tour begins in Glasgow, Scotland.

== 1983 ==
- January: The new album's first single, "New Year's Day" is released and becomes the band's first hit outside Ireland or the UK.
- 29 January: The band hire Willie Williams to be part of the design team of the forthcoming tour, beginning a creative relationship that lasts more than forty years.
- 28 February: The band release their third album War. which debuts at number one in the UK.
- 11 March: The single "Two Hearts Beat as One" is released in Europe, North America, and Australia. In Germany and The Netherlands, "Sunday Bloody Sunday" is released instead.
- 23 April: The American leg of the War Tour starts in Kenan Stadium, Chapel Hill, North Carolina.
- 30 May: US Festival at Glen Helen Regional Park, San Bernardino, CA, USA
- 5 June: U2 plays in the Red Rocks Amphitheatre in Denver.
- 12 July: The Edge marries Aislinn O'Sullivan with Bono serving as best man.
- November: The live mini album Under a Blood Red Sky is released alongside the video of the Denver concert, Live at Red Rocks: Under a Blood Red Sky.
- 22 November: U2 play their first Japanese concert, debuting in Osaka.

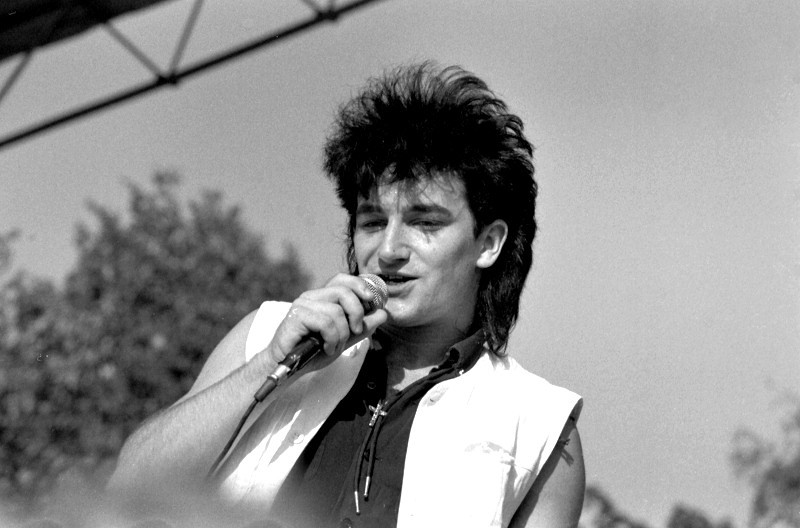
Bono singing during a U2 performance at the Kalvøya Festival in Oslo, Norway, near the end of the War Tour on 21 August 1983.

- 30 November: The War Tour ends.
- December: U2 is voted "Band of the Year" in the Rolling Stone magazine writer's poll.

== 1984 ==
- 1984: U2 re-sign with Island Records under far more lucrative terms.
- 7 May – 5 June: U2 work on their fourth album at Slane Castle. The band hired Brian Eno and Daniel Lanois as producers.
- 6 June – 7 August: U2 complete work on their fourth album at Windmill Lane Studios.
- 4 July: The Edge's wife Aislinn gives birth to their first child, Hollie.
- 1 August: U2 establish Mother Records.
- 29 August: The band's first tour of Australia and New Zealand begins in Christchurch. Dubbed, "Under Australian Skies Tour", it comprises 15 concerts with Australian band Matt Finish and a largely War Tour setlist is played.
- September: "Pride (In the Name of Love)" is released as the album's first single and becomes the band's biggest hit to that point, including being their first to enter the U.S. top 40.
- 1 October: U2's fourth album, The Unforgettable Fire, is released.
- October – November: The Unforgettable Fire Tour plays 21 shows in halls and arenas in Western Europe.
- 1 December: The band play 10 dates in major United States cities. Demand for tickets significantly outstrip supply indicating that U2 will no longer be able to play these smaller theatres and halls.

== 1985 ==
- 1985: Rolling Stone magazine calls U2 the "Band of the 80s", saying that "for a growing number of rock-and-roll fans, U2 have become the band that matters most, maybe even the only band that matters".
- January – February: The band play 13 shows in Western Europe. The leg included 5 shows in Germany and the band's first concert in Italy.
- Late February – May: U2 play 40 shows in 29 cities in the United States and Canada. For the first time, the band play solely in arenas with multiple nights in many of the locations.
- April: The album's second and final single, "The Unforgettable Fire", is released. It reaches No. 6 on the UK Singles Chart and No. 8 on the Dutch singles chart, but does not perform as well in the U.S.
- May: The four-track EP Wide Awake in America is released.
- Late May – mid July: U2 play nine concerts in the European festival season.
- 29 June: U2 play a homecoming concert at Dublin's Croke Park, their first headlining show in a stadium.
- 13 July: U2 perform at the Live Aid benefit concert for Ethiopian famine relief at Wembley Stadium. The band's performance, which included a 12-minute version of "Bad", is a pivotal point for the band's career, showing a television audience of millions the personal connection that Bono could make with audiences.
- September: Bono and wife, Ali, volunteer as relief workers for World Vision in Ethiopia.
- 15 October: The Edge and wife Aislinn's second child, Arran, is born.

== 1986 ==
- 30 January: Bono and Larry Mullen are interviewed for half an hour on the Irish TV show, TV Gaga, before the band play a song called "Womanfish", a rough early version of "Trip Through Your Wires", and a cover of "Knocking on Heaven's Door".
- February: The debut issue of Propaganda, U2's new fan club magazine, is published.
- 27 February: U2 are among the readers’ choice in Rolling Stone's Music Awards, for Band of the Year. Best Songwriter was Bono, Best Live Performance was U2. In the Critics' Picks, the Band of the Year was U2.
- 17 May: U2 play the Self Aid festival in Dublin. The event is organised to create jobs and raise money during Ireland's unemployment crisis.
- 4–15 June: U2 interrupt writing for their album to serve as a headline act on Amnesty International's A Conspiracy of Hope tour. Rather than distract, the tour adds extra intensity and power to their new music.
- 3 July: U2 crew member Greg Carroll is killed in a motorcycle accident in Dublin.
- 10 July: Band members perform at Carroll's burial Kai-iwi Marae in New Zealand.
- mid-July: Bono and wife Ali travel to Nicaragua on a visit organised by Central American Mission Partners (CAMP), which is dedicated to human rights and economic development in Latin America. They visit Ernesto Cardenal of the Sandinista government and musician Carlos Mejía Godoy.
- 19 July: The group listens to President Daniel Ortega speak on the country's Revolution Day.
- 20 July: Bono is moved by churchgoers calling out the names of loved ones who have died fighting the contras.
- late July: Bono and Ali's group flies to El Salvador for 4 to 5 days. They meet the group COMADRES – the Mothers of the Disappeared – a group of women whose children have been killed or disappeared at the hands of the government. As the group walks through a remote rural area north of San Salvador, government troops shoot in their direction, scaring the group.
- 1 August: The band recommence recording sessions at Windmill Lane Studios in Dublin. Bono's first-hand experience of the conflicts in Central America became a central influence on songs such as "Bullet The Blue Sky" and "Mothers of the Disappeared". Motivated by friendships with Bob Dylan, Van Morrison, and Keith Richards, the band looked back to the roots of rock music, and Bono focused on his skills as a song and lyric writer.
- October: U2 see blues legend B.B. King play in Dublin and they meet him backstage. The band and King later record the song "When Love Comes to Town".
- November: Recording sessions for the new album finish.

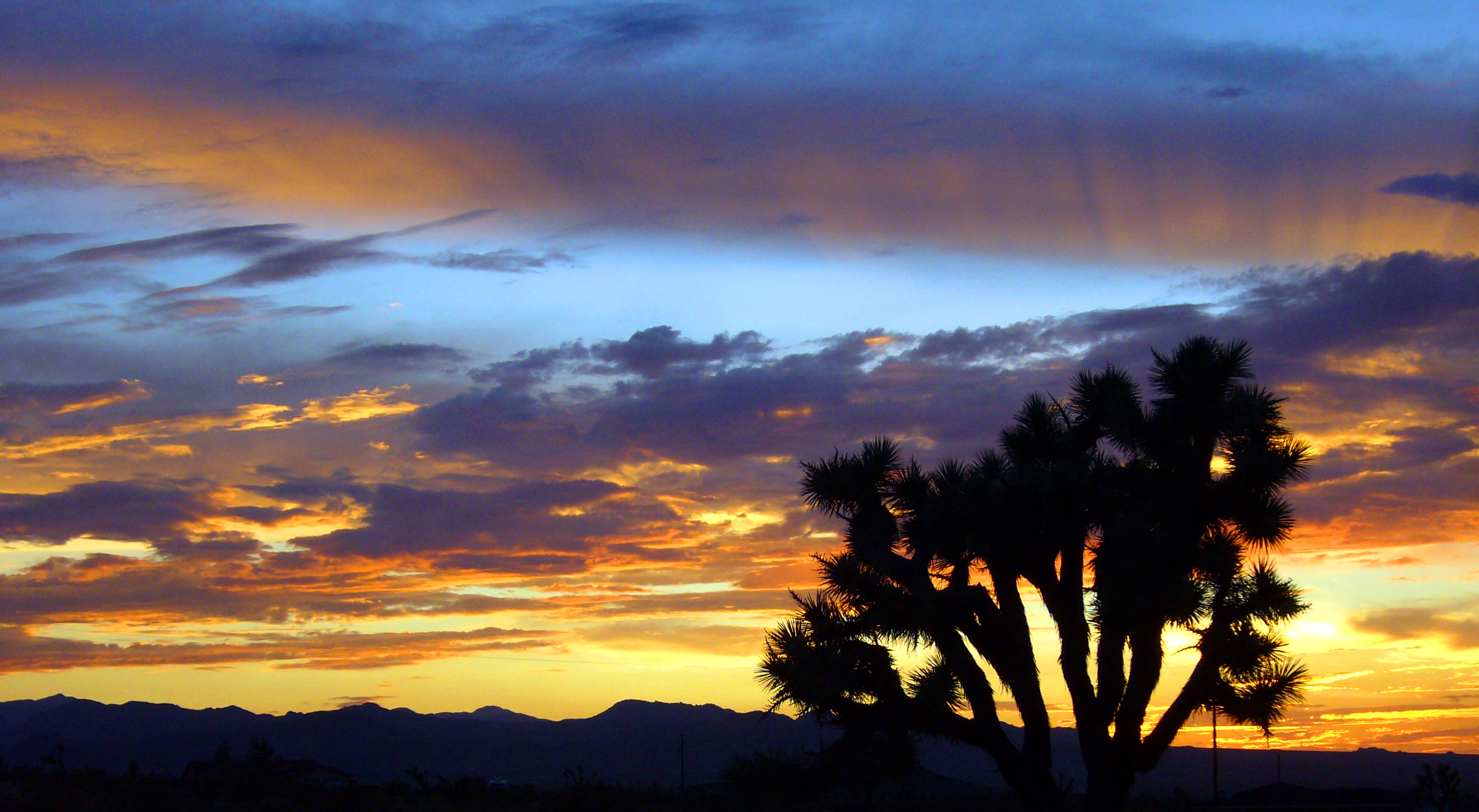
Silhouette of a Joshua Tree, the band's fifth album was named after this plant.

- 14–16 December: U2 travel around the Californian desert with photographer Anton Corbijn and designer Steve Averill, shooting pictures in the desert landscape for the new album's cover. On the evening after the first day's shooting, Corbijn tells the band about Joshua Trees and suggests their use on the sleeve. The following day they find an unusual lone-standing tree, images of which are used for the album sleeve, and the album is named The Joshua Tree.
- late December: U2 call in Steve Lillywhite to remix a few of the new songs which he works on into the new year.

== 1987 ==
- January: U2 complete B-side recordings for the album's single releases, including the tracks "Walk to the Water", "Luminous Times", and "Spanish Eyes".
- February: U2 shoot a video for "Red Hill Mining Town", which was intended to be one of the album's singles but it was not released. A video is also shot for "With or Without You" in Dublin.
- 9 March: U2's fifth studio album, The Joshua Tree, is released and goes to number one in 22 countries.
- 21 March: "With or Without You" is released and becomes the band's first number one single on the US Billboard Hot 100.
- 27 March: U2 perform on the roof of a shop in downtown Los Angeles and film the video for "Where the Streets Have No Name".
- 30 March: In rehearsals for The Joshua Tree Tour, Bono falls backwards off the stage and his chin is gashed. He still carries the scar. The Joshua Tree enters the US Billboard 200 chart at number 7.
- 2 April: U2 open The Joshua Tree Tour in Tempe, Arizona. The hot dry desert air affects Bono's voice, and he is barely able to sing on opening night. Concert promoter Barry Fey reads out a statement on behalf of the band denouncing Arizona Governor, Evan Mecham's intention to abolish the Martin Luther King Day holiday in that State.
- 7 April: The Joshua Tree reaches number one on the US Billboard 200, where it remains for nine weeks.
- 12 April: Following a concert in Las Vegas, the band film the video clip for "I Still Haven't Found What I'm Looking For" in the neon-lit streets.
- 14 April: Maria McKee performs a duet with Bono on U2's cover of "I Shall Be Released" during their concert in San Diego.
- 20 April: Bob Dylan joins the band onstage to sing "I Shall Be Released" and "Knocking on Heaven's Door".
- 27 April: U2 become the fourth rock band to be featured on the cover of Time magazine, which declares U2 "Rock's Hottest Ticket".
- 30 April: U2 play their first headlining stadium show in the United States at the Pontiac Silverdome.
- May: Sales of The Joshua Tree surpass seven million. "I Still Haven't Found What I'm Looking For" is released and reaches number one on the US Billboard Hot 100.
- 27 May: U2 begin the European leg of the Joshua Tree Tour at the Stadio Flaminio in Rome. Most of the leg's 31 shows are in outdoor stadia.
- 2 June: After listening to Roy Orbison's "In Dreams" the night before, Bono starts writing a song for Orbison. After that night's show at Wembley Arena, Orbison makes a surprise visit backstage where Bono plays the song, "She's a Mystery to Me" for him.
- 4 July: The show at the Hippodrome de Vincennes in Paris is filmed for Island Records' 25th birthday celebrations. A canister of tear gas is set off in the crowd causing mild panic and the band interrupt their performance of "With or Without You".
- August: "Where the Streets Have No Name" is released as The Joshua Tree's third single.
- August: U2 find out that Island Records is in financial difficulties and cannot pay them $5 million in The Joshua Tree royalties. U2 reinvest the unpaid amount into the company in return for an estimated 10% stake in the company.
- 26 September: U2 rehearse "I Still Haven't Found What I'm Looking For" with the New Voices of Freedom in a Harlem church, footage of which later appears in the documentary film Rattle and Hum.
- October: Eamon Dunphy's official biography of the band, Unforgettable Fire: The Definitive Biography of U2 is published.
- November: "In God's Country" is released as a single in Canada and the US. Import sales are so strong that it charts in the UK.
- 1 November: The Dalton Brothers make the first of three appearances on The Joshua Tree Tour as support act for U2. A country and western four-piece that plays two songs; they are actually U2 in disguise and all but the front few rows of the audience fail to recognise them.
- 8 November: U2 play the McNichols Sports Arena in Denver. The same day, an IRA bomb had killed eleven people at a Remembrance Day ceremony in the Northern Irish town of Enniskillen. During the performance of "Sunday Bloody Sunday", Bono condemned the violence and his "Fuck the revolution!" remark earned him the ire of the IRA. This performance and six other songs from the concert are later used in the Rattle and Hum film.
- 11 November: U2 play an impromptu "Save the Yuppie" concert in Justin Herman Plaza in San Francisco as a mock benefit following the October 1987 stock market crash. A cover version of Bob Dylan's "All Along the Watchtower" is captured for Rattle and Hum. During a performance of "Pride", Bono spray-painted "Rock and Roll Stops the Traffic" on the Vaillancourt Fountain. The city issues a warrant for Bono's arrest and Bono writes a letter of apology.
- 29 November: U2 visit Graceland and footage from the visit is later included in the Rattle and Hum movie.
- 19–20 December: The Joshua Tree Tour concludes with two performances at the Sun Devil Stadium in Arizona. Footage of five songs is later used in Rattle and Hum.

== 1988 ==
- February: U2 move to Los Angeles to work with Phil Joanou on the Rattle and Hum documentary. While in LA, they also record new songs at A&M Studios and STS Studios.

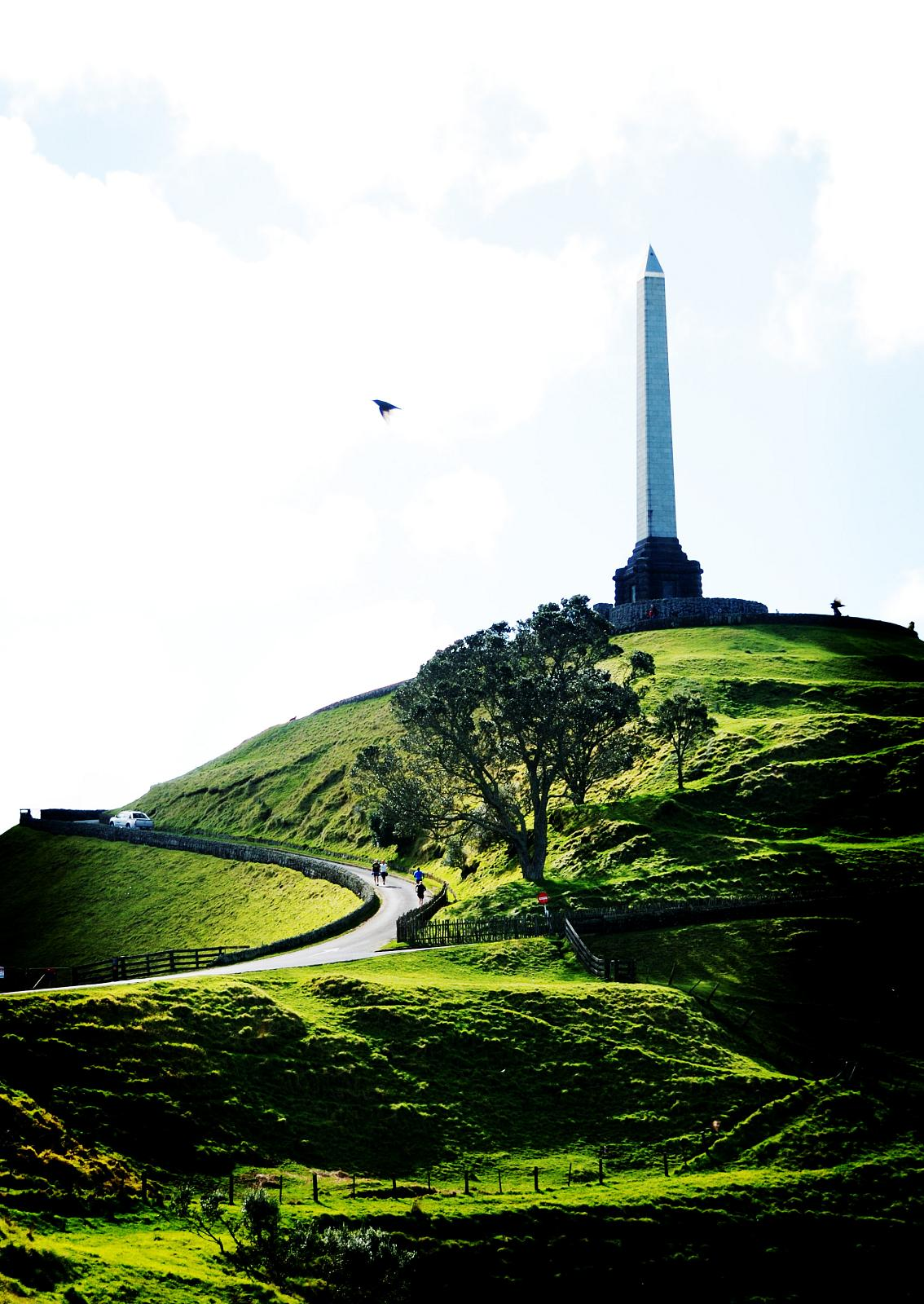
One Tree Hill in 2008.

- March: "One Tree Hill" is released as a single exclusively in New Zealand.
- 2 March: At the Grammy Awards, U2 win "Best Vocal of the Year" for "I Still Haven't Found What I'm Looking For" and "Album of the Year" for The Joshua Tree.
- May: U2 record additional material for the movie at Dublin's Point Depot. Footage of performances of "Van Diemen's Land" and "Desire" are later used in the movie.
- September: "Desire" is released as the new album's first single. It is the band's first number one single in the UK.
- 10 October: The part live, part studio, double album Rattle and Hum is released.
- 27 October: The Rattle and Hum film has its world premiere.
- November: The Edge joins Bryan Ferry on stage for a surprise appearance at the RDS in Dublin.
- 6 December: Roy Orbison, for whom Bono and the Edge had recently written "She's a Mystery to Me", dies in the United States before the release of his Mystery Girl album.
- 17 December: "Angel of Harlem" is released as Rattle and Hum's second single.

== 1989 ==
- April: "When Love Comes to Town" is released as Rattle and Hum's third single.
- 10 May: Bono and Ali's first child, Jordan, is born on Bono's 29th birthday.
- 13 June: "All I Want is You" is released as Rattle and Hum's fourth and final single. Its release in Australia is delayed until October to coincide with the Lovetown Tour. It reaches number one on the Australian charts.

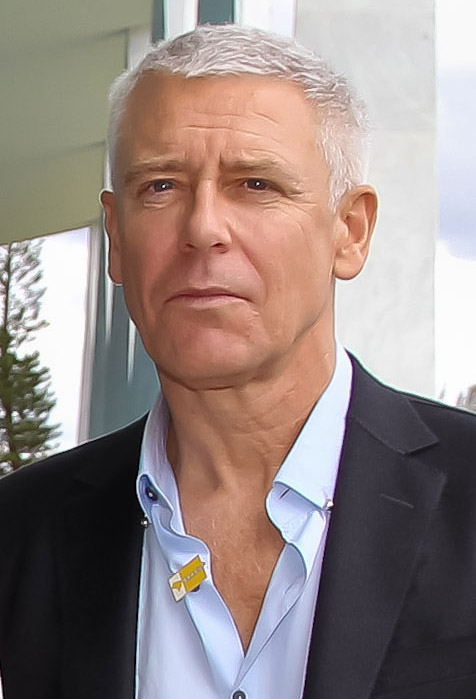
Adam Clayton

- 6 August: Adam Clayton is arrested in Dublin on drug charges.
- 21 September: The Lovetown Tour starts in Australia.
- 30 December: Towards the end of the Lovetown Tour, Bono says on stage in Dublin that "this is just the end of something for U2" and that "we have to go away and … and dream it all up again".

"It's your future. The only limits are the limits of your imagination. Dream up the kind of world you want to live in. Dream out loud. At high volume.""

— Bono, 31 December 1989
- 31 December: At midnight, U2 open the last of four Dublin shows with "Where The Streets Have No Name" as the audience counts down the last seconds of the 1980s. The show is played live on radio throughout Europe.

== 1990 ==
- January: U2 begin their longest break to date, which includes a two-year break from public performance.
- 17 January: With the rest of U2 in attendance, Bono inducts The Who into the Rock and Roll Hall of Fame
- 6 February: The Royal Shakespeare Company's theatrical version of A Clockwork Orange debuts in London. Bono and Edge provide the score.
- 18 February: U2 is named Best International Group at the Brit Awards.
- March: Bono writes two songs with the Neville Brothers called "Jah Love" and "Kingdom Come".
- April: Mullen writes the official anthem of Ireland's 1990 World Cup Football Team. It is released under a Mother Records subsidiary and reaches number one on the Irish Charts.
- June: U2 record "Night and Day" for the first of the Red Hot + Blue releases. The song is recorded in Edge's basement and produced by Edge and Paul Barrett.
- mid-1990: The band record demos at STS studios in Dublin that later evolve into "Who's Gonna Ride Your Wild Horses", "Until the End of the World", "Even Better Than the Real Thing", and "Mysterious Ways".
- 3 October: The band arrive in East Berlin to begin work on a new album. With producers Daniel Lanois and Brian Eno, they are seeking inspiration and renewal on the eve of German reunification.
- 4 October: U2 shoot the music video for "Night and Day" at director Wim Wenders' home in Berlin.
- December: U2 do several photo shoots with Anton Corbijn around their hotel and at Hansa Studios, for the new album sleeve and also for publicity shots.
- Christmas: The members of U2 get together in Dublin to talk about the group's future after the difficulties of the Berlin sessions. They all agree to continue.

== 1991 ==
- January: The band return to Berlin to finalise some recording work.
- 9 February: U2 arrive in Tenerife for two weeks of photo and video shoots, which the band hopes will change its image. They dress in masks and join the crowds in the Carnival of Santa Cruz de Tenerife. It is during this time that the photos of U2 in drag are taken.
- late February/March – July: Back in Dublin, U2 rent the Dalkey seaside manor, "Elsinore House", to continue work on the new album.
- Easter: The Edge separates from his wife, Aislinn. The pain of their separation strongly influences the album material which is being written.
- 17 March: U2 meet with Willie Williams to continue discussions on the band's next tour.
- April: Tapes from the album's earlier Berlin session's are leaked and bootlegged.
- May: U2 sue the Sunday Independent over an October 1990 article based on third-hand reports about U2 behaving badly in a Dublin restaurant. The matter is settled out of court including a printed apology from the paper which says the original article had "no foundation in fact".
- mid-May: Island Records announces that it will pursue legal action against anyone selling U2's bootlegged studio tapes. In late May, authorities trace the tapes' distribution to Germany and a factory is shut down.

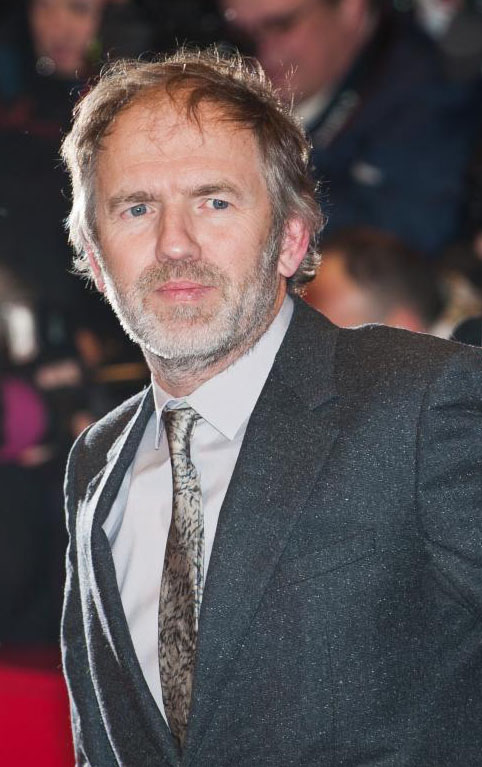
Anton Corbijn's most famous, and longest standing, association is with U2.

- June: Anton Corbijn is commissioned for another photo shoot, this time in Dublin, the results of which include the nude photo of Adam Clayton that is used on the album sleeve.
- 14 June: U2 meets with Willie Williams and Catherine Owens to discuss the next tour. New ideas include placing TV monitors all over the stage and using Trabants as overhead light sources.
- July: U2, Anton Corbijn, and designer Steve Averill meet in Morocco for a four-day photo shoot.
- 7 July: Bono and Ali's second child, Eve, is born.
- 20 August: Electronic band, Negativland, release a single called "U2" which includes an unauthorised sample of "I Still Haven't Found What I'm Looking For".
- 5 September: Island Records obtain an injunction against the sale and promotion of Negativland's "U2" single.
- 13 September: Parts of the video for the new album's first single, "The Fly" are shot in Dublin. The rest of the video is shot in London a few weeks later.
- 21 September: At the deadline for completion of the new album, U2 stay up all night choosing mixes and the album's running order.
- 22 September: The Edge takes the tapes of the new album to the United States for final mastering.
- October: The video of "Mysterious Ways" is shot in Fez in Morocco by director Stéphane Sednaoui, and Anton Corbijn photographs the band.
- 12 October: Actung Baby's first single, "The Fly", is released. It becomes U2's second number one single in the UK.
- 19 November: U2 release Achtung Baby.
- 25 November: "Mysterious Ways" is released as Achtung Baby's second single. The song reaches Number 9 on the Billboard Hot 100, making it the band's fourth-highest-charting single.

== 1992 ==
- 15 January: The Edge inducts The Yardbirds into the Rock and Roll Hall of Fame. On stage he joins Keith Richards, Neil Young, and Jimmy Page for a version of "Big River".
- 29 February: The Zoo TV Tour begins in Lakeland, Florida.
- March: The third single from Achtung Baby, "One", is released. It reaches number 7 in the UK charts, number 10 in the US charts, and number 1 on the US Mainstream Rock Tracks and the US Modern Rock Tracks charts.
- 5 March: U2 issue a statement denying newspaper reports that the words shown on video screens during performances of "The Fly" include "Bomb Japan Now" and that they have no wish to offend the people of Japan.
- 27 March: Bono orders 10,000 pizzas onstage for the audience at a concert in Detroit. The pizza supplier manages to deliver 100 pizzas.
- 7 May: The European leg of the Zoo TV tour opens in Paris.
- 31 May: Bono meets author Salman Rushdie for the first time backstage after a show in London.
- 7 June: The fourth single from Achtung Baby, "Even Better Than the Real Thing" is released. It reaches number 32 in the US and number 12 in the UK. A remix version reaches number 8 in the UK.
- 11 June: In a Stockholm show, Björn Ulvaeus and Benny Andersson from ABBA join the band for a performance of "Dancing Queen".
- 19 June: U2 play the "Stop Sellafield" show in Manchester. They play alongside Kraftwerk, Public Enemy, and Big Audio Dynamite II in protest against the operation of a second nuclear reactor at Sellafield. The following day, the band participate in a demonstration organised by Greenpeace whereby protesters land on the beach at Sellafield in rubber dinghies and display 700 placards for the waiting media.
- 29 June: Bono records a solo version of "Can't Help Falling in Love".

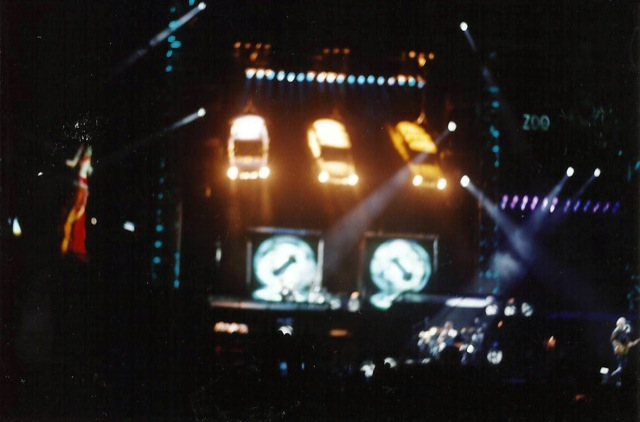
Morleigh Steinberg performing a belly dance in 1993.

- 7 August: After three weeks of stage erection and a week of rehearsals, U2 provide a public rehearsal. Morleigh Steinberg makes her debut as the belly dancer in "Mysterious Ways".
- 12 August: The Outside Broadcast leg of the Zoo TV tour opens in New Jersey.
- August: The fifth and final single from Achtung Baby, "Who's Gonna Ride Your Wild Horses", is released.
- 28 August: During a New York interview with Rockline, US presidential candidate Bill Clinton contacts U2 live on air.

== 1993 ==
- 20 January: Larry Mullen and Adam Clayton attend the inauguration of United States President Bill Clinton in Washington. That evening, together with R.E.M.'s Michael Stipe and Mike Mills, they perform "One" at the MTV 1993 Rock and Roll Inaugural Ball. They dub the one-off group, "Automatic Baby", after merging the names of the bands' most recent albums Automatic for the People and Achtung Baby.
- February: U2 start recording new material in Dublin.
- 23 February: Bono brings model Naomi Campbell to a U2 organisation party to meet Adam Clayton, who has a crush on Campbell. They start dating over the following days.
- 24 February: Achtung Baby: wins "Best Rock Vocal Performance by a Group or Duo" but loses "Album of the Year" to Eric Clapton's Unplugged.
- 4 March: In Rolling Stone magazine's readers' poll U2 win Best Band, Artist of the Year, Comeback of the Year, Best Tour, Best Album, and Best Album Cover, and Best Single (for "One"). Bono is voted Best Male Singer, Best Songwriter and Sexiest Male Artist. Mullen is voted Best Drummer and Edge and Clayton are runners up in their respective categories. Critics are slightly less enthusiastic.
- Late April: Having almost finished the Zooropa album, U2 rehearse for the European concerts.
- 9 May: Dubbed "Zooropa", the Zoo TV Tour recommences with a European stadium leg starting in Rotterdam. U2 play to 2,100,000 people over 43 shows. The concert includes the premier of Bono's new alter-ego MacPhisto. Throughout the month of May, the band often fly back to Dublin following concerts to finalise mixing of the Zooropa album.
- June: "Numb" is released as the first single from the new album. It is released on video only.
- 5 July: U2 release Zooropa.
- 14 July: At a concert in Marseille, Bono's holds the first of a number of live on-stage interviews with documentary maker Bill Carter who is in the besieged city of Sarajevo.
- 11 August: Author Salman Rushdie, the subject of a death Fatwa, joins U2 on stage in front of 70,000 people at Wembley Stadium.
- 28 August: On the final Zooropa concert in Dublin, Clayton's fiancée, model Naomi Campbell appears on stage.
- September: "Lemon" is released as the second single from Zooropa.
- 3 September: At the MTV awards in Los Angeles, The Edge makes his first ever solo appearance where he performs "Numb" in front of a miniature version of the Zoo TV set.
- November: Bono records the vocal for his duet with Frank Sinatra on "I've Got You Under My Skin" in Dublin.
- 12 November: U2 commence the "Zoomerang" leg of Zoo TV in Melbourne.
- 22 November: "Stay (Faraway, So Close!)" is released as Zooropa's third single.
- 26 November: Adam Clayton doesn't play the first of two concerts in Sydney. Bono tells the audience that he is suffering from a virus and his guitar technician Stuart Morgan fills in. It is the first time a member of U2 has missed a performance. It is later revealed that Clayton was too hungover to play.
- 27 November: The second Sydney concert is filmed and shown around the world as a pay per view TV show. The concert video is released the following year on VHS.
- 10 December: U2 play the final gig of the Zoo TV tour at the Tokyo Dome.

== 1994 ==
- February: U2 issue a writ challenging the Performing Rights Society on their exclusive rights to collect songwriting royalties for song performances.
- March: Zooropa wins "Best Alternative Album" award at the Grammys.

"It was my idea to relocate to New York for the year off and start a new life as non-drinker, which is commonly known as 'doing the geographic'. It was surprisingly easy to stop but it was difficult to stay stopped."

— Adam Clayton on quitting alcohol.
- 1994: Clayton and Mullen move to New York City to study music.
- April: Mullen and Clayton record four tracks with Nanci Griffith for her Flyer album.
- 17 May: The Zoo TV concert film, Zoo TV: Live from Sydney, is released in Europe and Australia.
- November: U2 and Brian Eno record new music over two weeks in a West London studio.

== 1995 ==
- February: Bono and the Edge record "North and South of the River" with Christy Moore.
- Mid-1995: U2, Brian Eno, and Howie B form Passengers and spend five weeks recording in Dublin.
- 1 June: U2 release the single, "Hold Me, Thrill Me, Kiss Me, Kill Me", which features in the Batman Forever soundtrack. It reaches Number 2 in the UK, Number 16 in America, and Number 1 in Australia and Ireland.
- 12 September: Bono, The Edge and Brian Eno premiere "Miss Sarajevo" at the annual Pavarotti and Friends concert in Modena, Italy.

"I love it, because it's so different to our normal work."

— The Edge on Original Soundtracks 1
- 7 November: The Passengers album Original Soundtracks 1 is released worldwide. "Miss Sarajevo" featuring Luciano Pavarotti was the only single from the release. On the same day, Tina Turner releases the theme for the new James Bond film GoldenEye, written by Bono and the Edge, on Capitol Records.

== 1996 ==
- January: U2 begin working on a new album in Dublin.
- April: The band move to Miami for further work on the album.
- 1 May: Clayton and Mullen release their version of the Mission: Impossible theme track. It enters the charts in the Top 10 in the US, the UK, and other countries.
- 11 May: Hot Press journalist Bill Graham dies at his home in Howth. The band fly back to Dublin from America to attend the funeral.

== 1997 ==
- 3 February: "Discothèque" is released as the first single from Pop.
- 4 March: U2 release Pop. The album debuts at number one in 35 countries and drew mainly positive reviews. Sales were poor compared to previous U2 releases.
- 15 April: "Staring at the Sun" is released as Pop's second single.

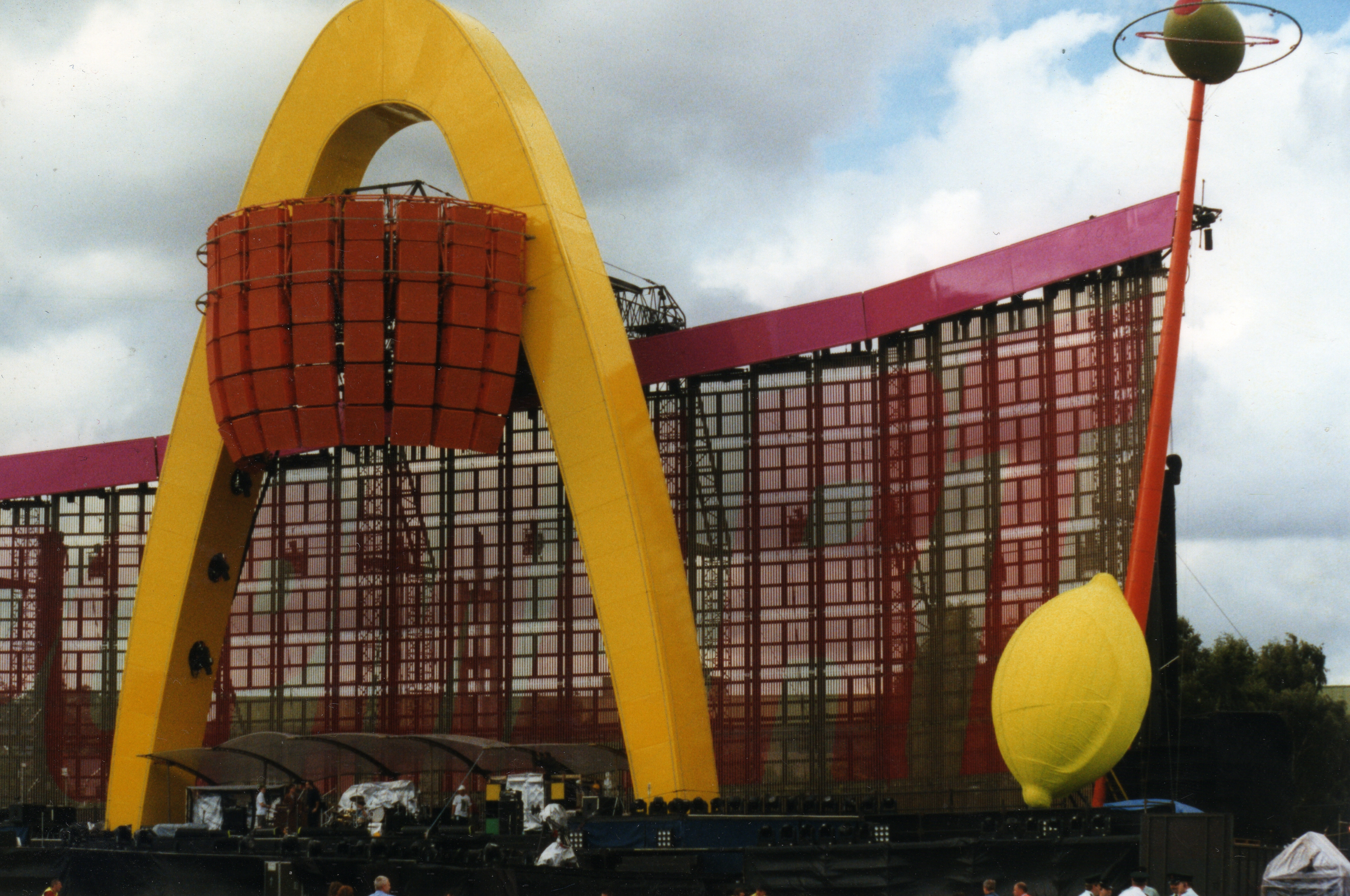
U2 stage designer Willie Williams and stage architect Mark Fisher developed the PopMart Tour.

- 25 April: The PopMart Tour commences in Las Vegas.
- 14 July: "Last Night on Earth" is released as the third single from Pop.
- 8 September: The live EP PopHeart is released.
- 20 September: U2 play a PopMart show at the Festival Site in Reggio Emilia, Italy to an estimated 150,000 people, making it the biggest concert on the entire PopMart Tour.
- 23 September: U2 play a concert in Sarajevo; they are the first major group to perform there following the Bosnian War. Mullen described the concert as "an experience I will never forget for the rest of my life, and if I had to spend 20 years in the band just to play that show, and have done that, I think it would have been worthwhile."
- 20 October: "Please" is released as the fourth single from Pop.
- 8 December: "If God Will Send His Angels" and "Mofo" are released as the fifth and final singles respectively.

== 1998 ==
- 21 March: The PopMart Tour concludes in Johannesburg, South Africa.
- 26 April: One month following the conclusion of the PopMart Tour, U2 appeared on the 200th episode of The Simpsons, "Trash of the Titans", in which Homer Simpson disrupted the band on stage during a PopMart concert.
- 19 October: "Sweetest Thing" is released as a single.
- 9 November: The Best of 1980–1990 B-Sides is released.
- 22 November: The PopMart: Live from Mexico City video is released.
- 20 November: U2 appear on The Late Late Show in Dublin for the Omagh Tribute.
- 23 December: Larry Mullen Jr and partner Ann Acheson have a baby girl whom they name Ava after the actress Ava Gardner.

== 1999 ==
- 17 August: Bono and wife Ali have a baby boy, named Elijah.

== 2000 ==
- 9 October: "Beautiful Day" is released as a single, debuting at Number 1 in Australia, Canada and the UK, and at Number 21 in the US.
- 30 October: All That You Can't Leave Behind is released. For many of those not won over by the band's 1990s music, it was considered a return to grace; Rolling Stone called it U2's "third masterpiece" alongside The Joshua Tree and Achtung Baby. The album debuted at number one in 22 countries.

== 2001 ==
- 22 February: The single "Beautiful Day" wins 3 Grammy Awards. U2 perform in a scaled-down setting, returning to arenas after nearly a decade of stadium productions. A heart-shaped stage and ramp permitted greater proximity to the audience.
- 29 February: "Stuck in a Moment You Can't Get Out Of" is released as the second single from All That You Can't Leave Behind.
- 24 March: American Leg of the Elevation Tour starts in Miami, Florida.
- 20 May: Bono and Ali have their fourth child, a son named John Abraham.
- 12 June: "Elevation" is released as the third single from the album.
- 7 July: European Leg of the Elevation Tour starts in Copenhagen, Denmark.
- 21 August: Bono's father, Brendan Robert 'Bob' Hewson, dies of cancer on the day of U2's third performance at Earl's Court Arena in London, England. However, "the show goes on", with Aung San Suu Kyi appearing in a new video before "Bullet the Blue Sky".
- 25 August: U2 play two sold-out concerts at Slane Castle.
- 10 October: U2 commence the second American leg of the Elevation Tour. Following the September 11 attacks, the new album gained added resonance. U2 perform at Madison Square Garden in New York City from 24 to 27 October.
- 19 November: "Walk On" is released as All That You Can't Leave Behind's fourth and final single. The song is written about Aung San Suu Kyi and dedicated to her.

== 2002 ==
- 3 February: U2 perform during the Super Bowl XXXVI halftime show, which SI.com ranked as the best half-time show in Super Bowl history.
- 27 February: U2 win 4 Grammy Awards for All That You Can't Leave Behind.
- 13 March: Bono meets President Bush at the White House as the U.S. pledges development boost.
- May: Bono tours 4 African countries with the U.S. Treasury Secretary, Paul O'Neill.
- September: Bono appears on The Oprah Winfrey Show and urges Oprah's audience to take action in the fight against AIDS in Africa.
- 21 October: "Electrical Storm" is released as a single.
- 12 November: The Best of 1990–2000 is released.
- December: Bono and DATA begin the Heart of America tour.

== 2003 ==
- 8 February: The exhibit "In the Name of Love: Two Decades of U2" opens at the Rock and Roll Hall of Fame and Museum.
- February: Bono receives the 'Knight of the Legion of Honour' medal from French President Jacques Chirac.
- March: U2 perform "The Hands That Built America" live at the Academy Awards.
- April: Bono is on the cover of Time Magazine as one of a group of great European Heroes.
- 21 June: U2 perform "One" and "Pride" live at the Opening Ceremony of the 11th Special Olympics World Summer Games; Nelson Mandela joins them on stage at Dublin's Croke Park.
- 17 November U2 Go Home: Live from Slane Castle, a concert film from the European leg of U2's Elevation Tour is released. Bono dedicates a performance of "Kite" to his father, who had died on 21 August 2001, several days before the concert.

== 2004 ==
- January: The single "Take Me to the Clouds Above", a house-pop collaboration by LMC vs U2, is released.
- 16 September: Bono is nominated a third time for the Nobel Peace Prize.
- 8 November: The new album's first single, "Vertigo", is released. It reaches number 1 on the UK Singles Chart, number 1 on the Billboard charts, and number 5 on the Australian charts.

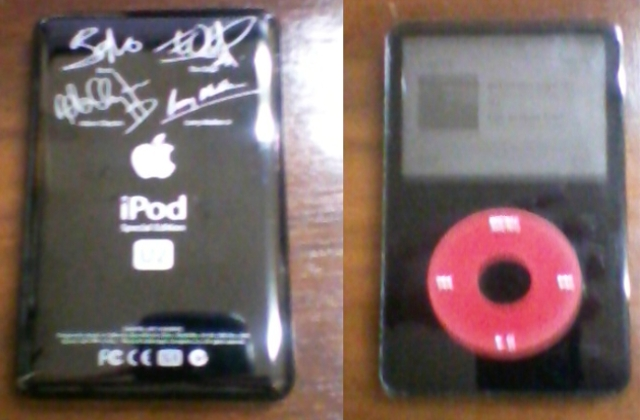
The U2 Special Edition iPod accompanied the digital only release of The Complete U2.

- 23 November: How to Dismantle an Atomic Bomb is released. The album debuted at number one in the U.S. where first week sales doubled that of All That You Can't Leave Behind and set a record for the band. The same day, The Complete U2 digital box set is released by Apple on the iTunes Store. It is the first major release of a purely digital online set by any artist. It contains the complete set of U2 albums and singles, and also contains live, rare and previously unreleased material from 1978 to 2004, with a total of 446 songs. The release accompanies a U2 Special Edition iPod.

== 2005 ==
- 2005: How to Dismantle an Atomic Bomb and its singles won Grammy Awards in all eight categories in which U2 were nominated.
- 7 February: "All Because of You" and "Sometimes You Can't Make It on Your Own" are released as the second and third singles from the album in North America and Europe respectively.
- March: Bruce Springsteen inducted U2 into the Rock and Roll Hall of Fame.

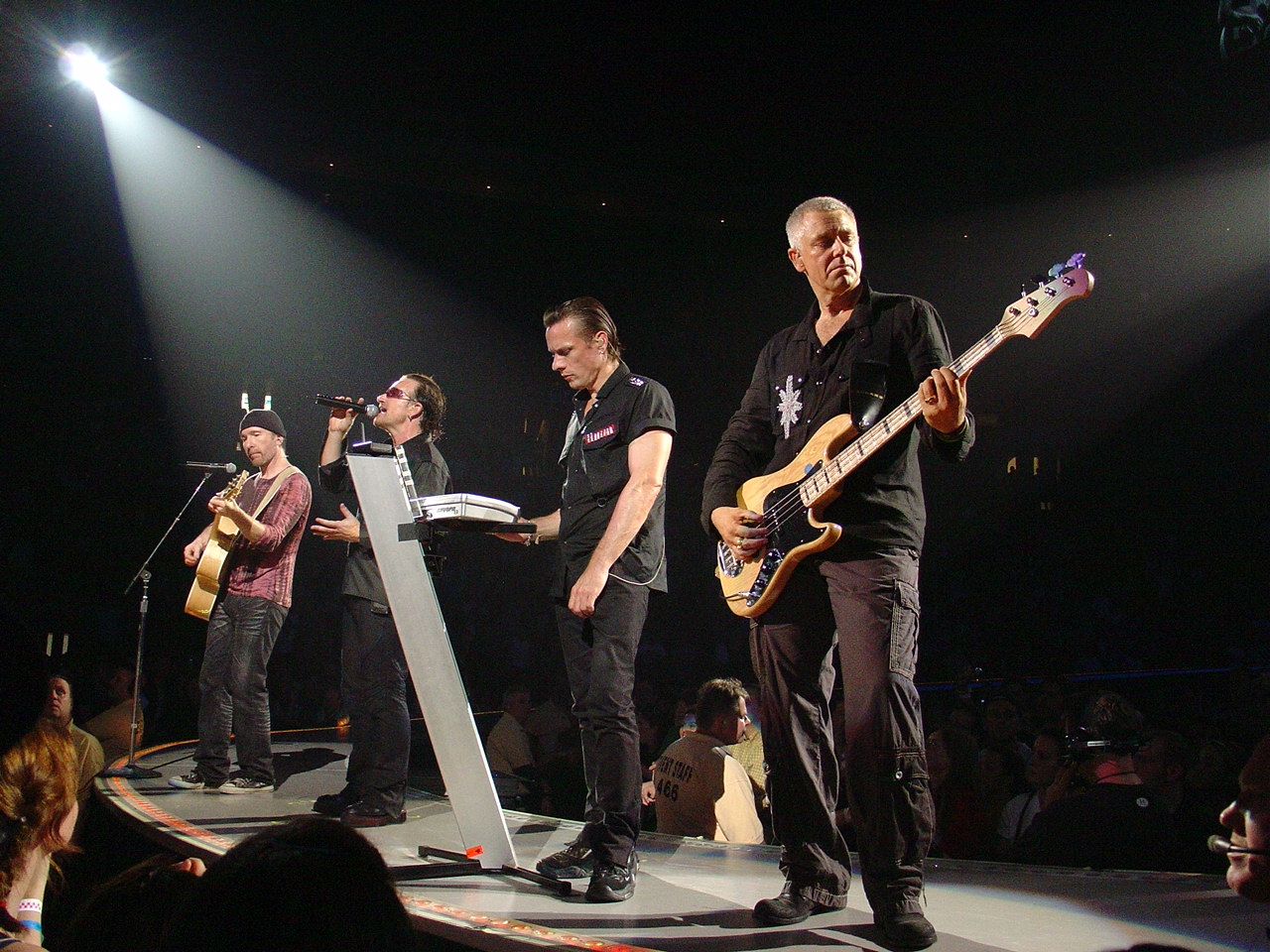
U2 performing on the Vertigo Tour.

- 28 March: The Vertigo Tour commences in San Diego, California.
- 22 April: U2.COMmunication is released to subscribers of U2.com.
- 27 April: U2 shoot a video for "City of Blinding Lights" at General Motors Place in Vancouver, British Columbia. Members of the public are invited into the venue as an audience backdrop.
- 9 - 10 May: Two concerts in Chicago, Illinois, are filmed for the video release Vertigo 2005: Live from Chicago.
- 6 June: "City of Blinding Lights" is released as the fourth single from How to Dismantle an Atomic Bomb.
- 10 June: The European leg of the Vertigo Tour commences in Brussels, Belgium.
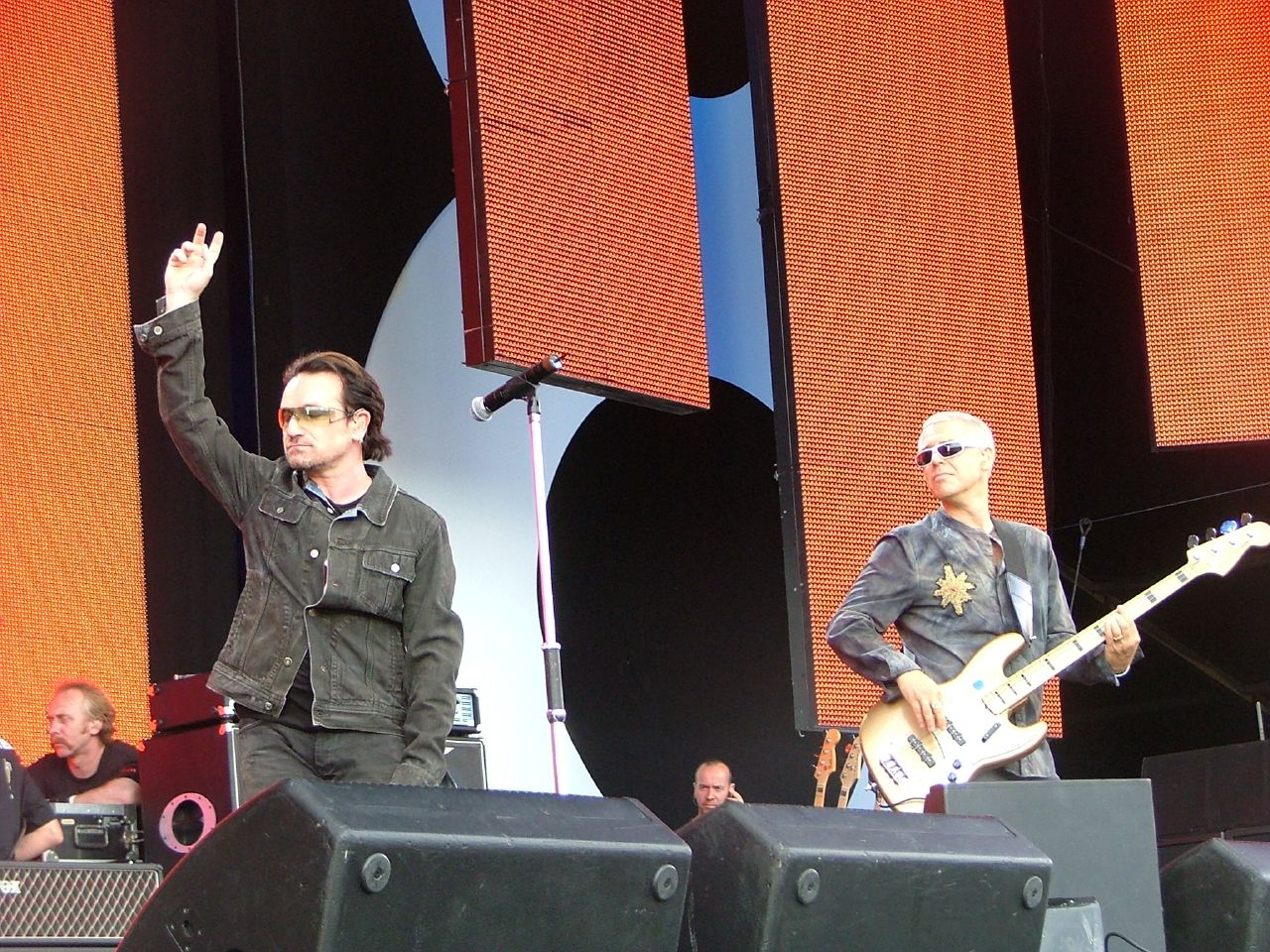
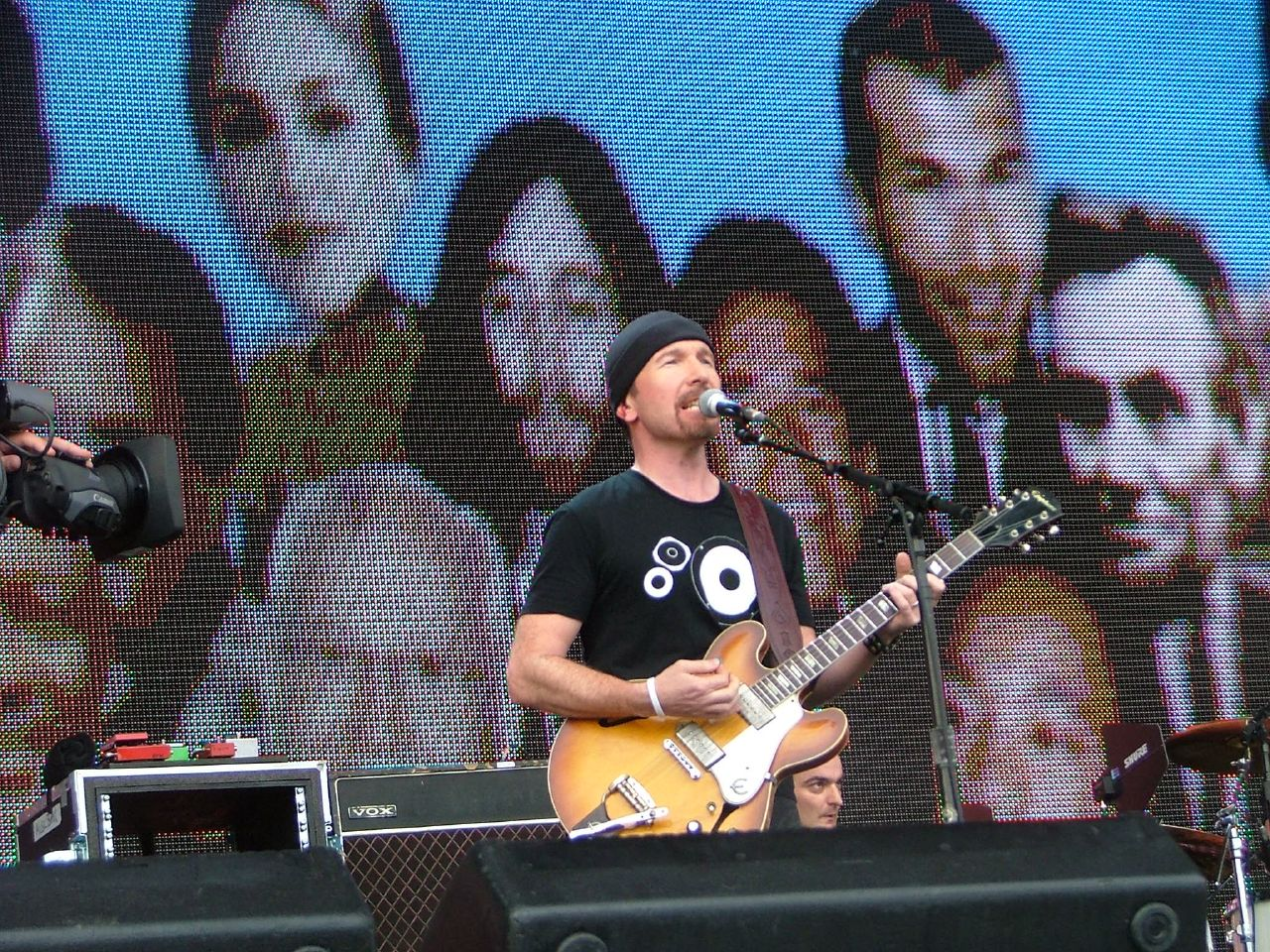
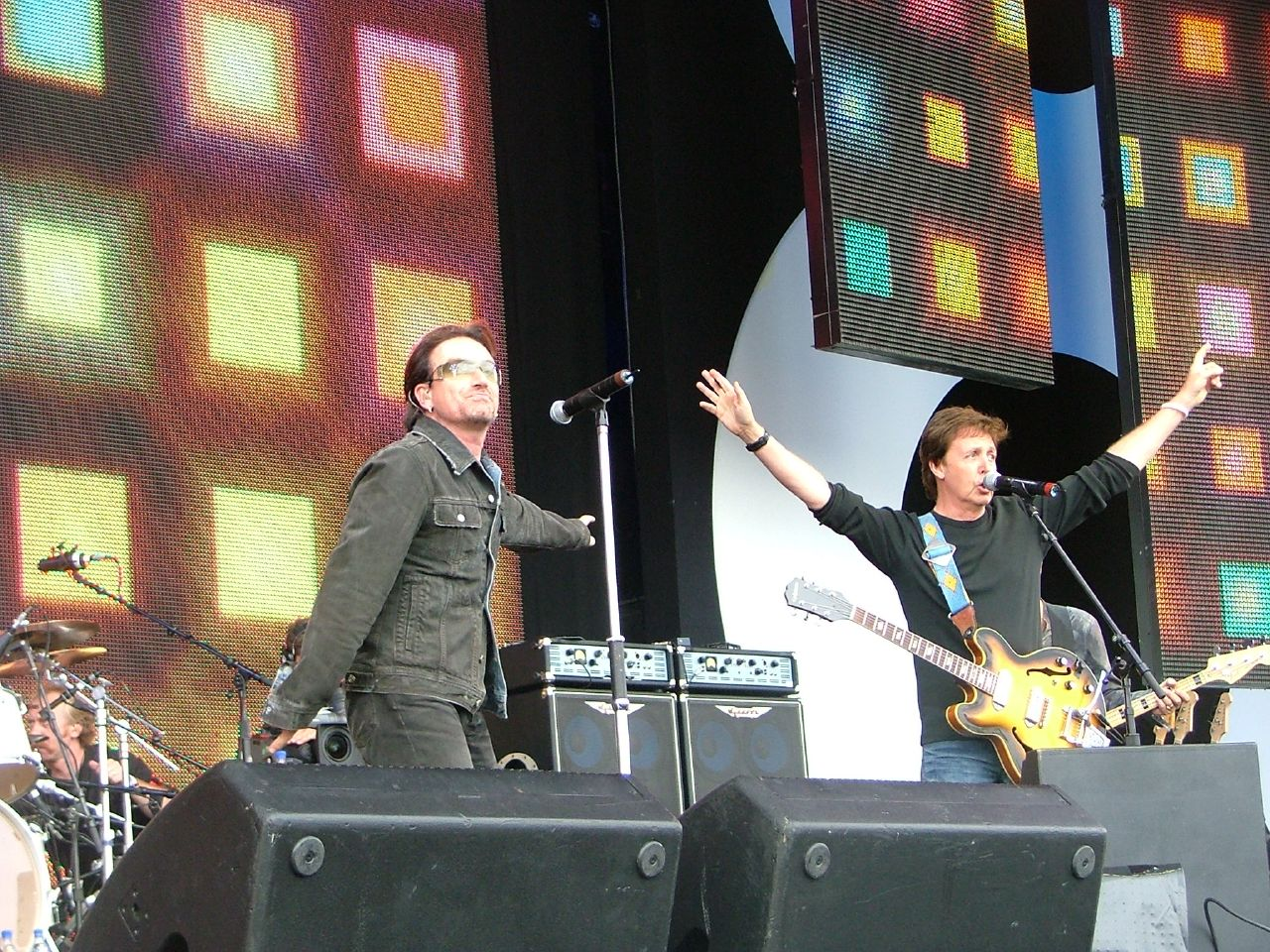
The band performing at Live 8.
- 2 July: U2 perform at Live 8 in London's Hyde Park, opening the show. The band plays "Sgt. Pepper's Lonely Hearts Club Band" with Paul McCartney, "Beautiful Day", "Vertigo", and "One". The performance of "Sgt. Pepper's Lonely Hearts Club Band" is released as a digital-single during the day and sets a world record as the fastest-selling online song.
- 20–21 July: Two concerts in Milan, Italy, are filmed. Ten songs would later be included on Vertigo 05: Live from Milan, a bonus DVD included with U218 Singles.
- 12 September: A second North American leg of the Vertigo Tour commences in Toronto, Ontario.
- 10 October: "Sometimes You Can't Make It on Your Own" and "All Because of You" are released as the fourth single from How to Dismantle an Atomic Bomb in North America and Europe respectively, switching territories from their earlier releases.
- November: "Original of the Species" is released as the album's fifth and final single in a digital-only format.
- 14 November: Vertigo 2005: Live from Chicago is released on DVD.

== 2006 ==
- 12 February: An eight-date Latin American leg of the Vertigo tour commences in Mexico.
- March: U2 arrive in Australia to prepare for the Australian leg of the Vertigo Tour. The tour, however, is postponed until further notice due to Edge's 7-year-old daughter Sian's diagnosis of leukaemia.
- 3 April: A duet of "One" with Mary J. Blige is released as a single.
- Mid-2006: The band begin work on material for a new album writing and recording with producer Rick Rubin; the material is later shelved.
- August: The band incorporates its publishing business in The Netherlands following the capping of Irish artists' tax exemption at €250,000. The move was criticised in the Irish parliament.
- 25 September: U2 play with Green Day to open an NFL game in the Louisiana Superdome. It is the first game in the stadium following the heavy damage it sustained from Hurricane Katrina. They play a four-song set of "Wake Me Up When September Ends", "House of the Rising Sun", "The Saints Are Coming", and "Beautiful Day".
- 31 October: A studio cover with Green Day of The Skids' song "The Saints Are Coming" is released as a single for the charity Music Rising.
- 7 November: The 13 postponed dates of the Vertigo Tour in Australia, New Zealand, Japan, and Hawaii commence in Brisbane.
- 17 November: U218 Singles and U218 Videos are released. The bonus DVD on U218 Singles includes ten tracks taken from the 2005 concerts in Milan.
- 18 November: Zoo TV Live is released to subscribers of U2.com
- 9 December: The Vertigo Tour concludes in Honolulu, Hawaii.

== 2007 ==
- 1 January: The "Window in the Skies" single is released.
- June: The band continue writing and recording for the album, this time with Daniel Lanois and Brian Eno as co-writers and producers. A two-week trip to Fez, Morocco, where the six of them recorded, led to the band experimenting with North African influences.
- 20 November: The Joshua Tree is re-released as a 20th anniversary triple album.

== 2008 ==
- 23 January: A 3-D concert film, U2 3D, filmed at nine concerts during the Latin America leg of the Vertigo Tour is released at the Sundance Film Festival in Park City, Utah.
- 19 February: The single "The Ballad of Ronnie Drew" - a collaboration between U2, The Dubliners, Kíla, and "A Band of Bowsies" - is released. All proceeds went towards the Irish Cancer Society; the song is an homage to Ronnie Drew, who was dying of cancer at the time.
- 31 March: U2 sign a 12-year deal with Live Nation worth an estimated $100 million (£50 million), which includes Live Nation controlling the band's merchandise, sponsoring, and their official website.
- Mid-2008: Boy, October, War, and Under a Blood Red Sky are remastered and released. Three different formats of each were made available, featuring remastered tracks, B-sides, live, and unreleased songs.
- 18 December: The band complete their twelfth studio album, No Line on the Horizon, and announce that the album will be released to the world on 2 March 2009.

== 2009 ==
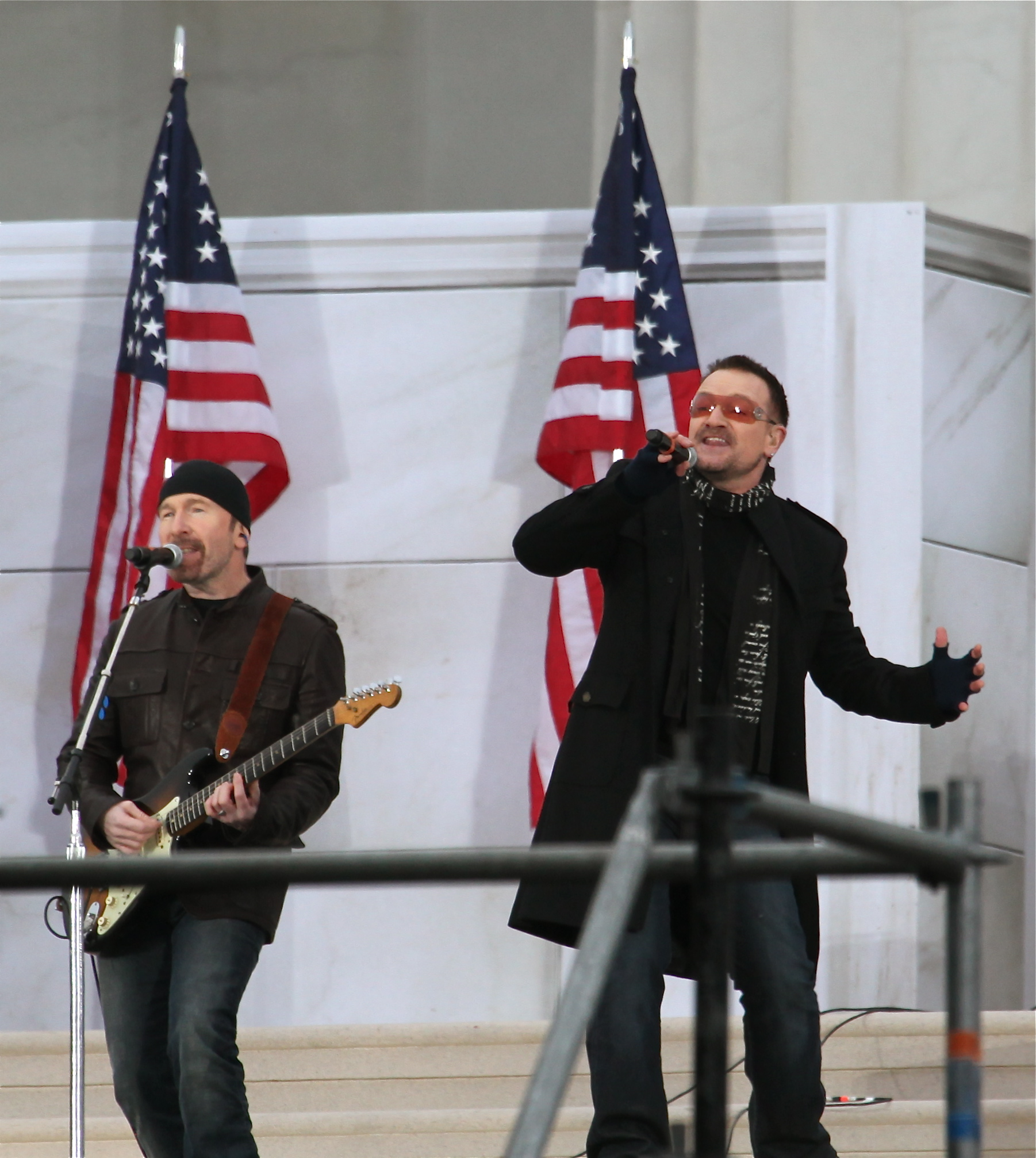
Bono and The Edge performing at the Lincoln Memorial

- 18 January: U2 perform "Pride (In the Name of Love)" and "City of Blinding Lights" at the We Are One concert, celebrating the inauguration of US President Barack Obama at the Lincoln Memorial in Washington, D.C.
- 23 January: "Get on Your Boots" is released as the first single from the new album.
- 27 February: U2's twelfth studio album, No Line on the Horizon, is released.
- 27 March: Medium, Rare & Remastered is released to subscribers of U2.com.
- 4 May: "Magnificent" is released as the second single from the album.
- 30 June: The U2 360° Tour commences in Europe. The shows feature a 360-degree staging/audience configuration, in which the fans surround the stage from all sides.
- 27 July: The Script provide the support act for the band's Croke Park show of their World Tour, performing songs from their self-titled album including "Before the Worst", "The Man Who Can't Be Moved" and "We Cry", among others.
- 17 August: "I'll Go Crazy If I Don't Go Crazy Tonight" is released as the third single from No Line on the Horizon.
- 25 October: The band's concert at the Rose Bowl Stadium is live streamed on YouTube. With a sellout crowd of 97,014, it is the highest attendance on record for one U.S. show by a single headliner based on box office totals reported to Billboard. The previous record had been set by U2 in 1987.
- 27 October: A 25th Anniversary remastered edition of The Unforgettable Fire is released by Mercury Records.
- 28 October: U2 conclude the 2009 legs of the 360° Tour in Vancouver.
- 30 October: U2 headline the second of two consecutive concerts at Madison Square Garden to celebrate the 25th anniversary of the Rock and Roll Hall of Fame.
- 5 November: U2 are invited by the Berlin Lord Mayor to play a concert at the Brandenburg Gate to commemorate the fall of the Berlin Wall. They play a six-song set to 10,000 fans.

== 2010 ==
- 25 March: Artificial Horizon is released to subscribers of U2.com.
- 21 May: Bono has emergency surgery on a back injury sustained during tour preparations, and the band postpones the North American leg of the U2 360° Tour and their appearance at the Glastonbury Festival.
- 26 June: The Edge makes a special guest appearance with Muse at Glastonbury to perform "Where the Streets Have No Name".
- 13 July: U2 announce the rescheduled dates for the postponed North American leg of the U2 360° tour.
- 6 August: The second European leg of the U2 360° Tour commences in Turin. It marks their first performance since Bono's recovery from his back injury.
- 25 November: U2 begin the Australasian leg of the 360° Tour at Mt Smart Stadium in Auckland, New Zealand.

== 2011 ==
- 31 January: U2 announces the last date of their U2 360° Tour will be in Moncton, New Brunswick, Canada, their first date ever in Atlantic Canada.
- 10 May: Duals is released to subscribers of U2.com.
- 24 June: U2 headline the first night of the Glastonbury Festival.
- 30 July: The 360° Tour concludes with a performance in Moncton, New Brunswick, Canada.
- 8 September: The documentary film From the Sky Down, about U2 and the making of Achtung Baby, premieres at Toronto International Film Festival.

== 2012 ==
- 1 May: U22 is released to subscribers of U2.com.
- 17 December: From the Ground Up: Edge's Picks is released to subscribers of U2.com.

== 2013 ==
- 29 May: Bono and the Edge help celebrate Spider-Man: Turn Off the Dark's 1,000th show.
- 17 June: Bono speaks out for Voices Against Violence Campaign.
- 18 June: The Obama family meet Bono for a pub lunch in Dalkey.
- 25 June: Mark Fisher, U2's longtime stage architect, dies.
- 16 July: Bono is made Commandeur des Arts et des Lettres by the French Minister of Culture.
- 2 September: U2 attends funeral mass for Seamus Heaney.
- 3 September: Larry Mullen's second film, A Thousand Times Goodnight, wins Special Grand Prix of the Jury at Montreal World Film Festival.
- 4 September: Adam Clayton marries Mariana Teixeira de Carvalho, a Brazilian supermodel, in a ceremony in Dublin.
- 17 October: A song titled "Ordinary Love" is revealed to be written specifically for the film Mandela: Long Walk to Freedom. Subscribers of the band's official website are able to hear it first.
- 29 November: "Ordinary Love" is officially released as a single.

== 2014 ==
- 16 January: U2 receive an Academy Award nomination for "Ordinary Love".
- 2 February: U2 release a charity single titled "Invisible", a song incorrectly believed to be included on the band's 13th studio album.
- 9 September: U2 perform at an Apple product launch event in Cupertino, California, and announce that their 13th studio album, Songs of Innocence, will be released through the iTunes Store to all customers at no cost that day. The first single from the album, "The Miracle (of Joey Ramone)", is also released.
- 16 November: Bono is involved in a "high energy bicycle accident" in New York's Central Park when he attempts to avoid another rider. Bono is rushed to NewYork-Presbyterian Hospital/Weill Cornell Medical Center's Emergency Department and undergoes "multiple X-rays and CAT scans" followed by five hours of surgery.
- 9 December: "Every Breaking Wave" is released as the second single from Songs of Innocence.

== 2015 ==
- 11 May: "Song for Someone" is released as the third single from Songs from Innocence.
- 14 May: The Innocence + Experience Tour begins in Vancouver, Canada.
- 4 September: The European leg of the Innocence + Experience Tour begins in Turin, Italy.
- 7 December: The Innocence + Experience Tour concludes in Paris, France. The performance is a rescheduling of their 15 November date due to the terrorist attacks the previous day. The performance is filmed and broadcast as Innocence + Experience: Live in Paris on HBO the same day.

== 2016 ==
- 10 June: The Innocence + Experience: Live in Paris concert film is released on DVD, Blu-ray Disc and via digital download.
- December: Bono undergoes open-heart surgery due to a "blister" that formed over time in his aorta as a result of having a bicuspid aortic valve. The eight-hour operation is performed by David H. Adams at Mount Sinai Hospital; Bono makes a full recovery.

== 2017 ==
- 12 May: The band commences a 30th anniversary tour for their album The Joshua Tree in Vancouver, Canada.
- 6 September: "You're the Best Thing About Me" is released as the first single from the band's upcoming 14th studio album Songs of Experience.
- 8 November: The Joshua Tree Tour 2017 concludes in São Paulo, Brazil.
- 1 December: U2's 14th studio album, Songs of Experience, is released.
- 2 December: The band appear as the musical guest on an episode Saturday Night Live.
- 8 December: "Get Out of Your Own Way" is released as the second single from Songs of Experience.

== 2018 ==
- 23 April: "Love Is Bigger Than Anything in Its Way" is released as the third single from Songs of Experience.
- 2 May: The Experience + Innocence Tour begins in Tulsa, Oklahoma.
- 1 June: Sirius XM Satellite Radio launches a limited-time U2-exclusive radio station called "The U2 Experience" on channel 30, which features the band's music as well as interviews with the members.
- 10 August: "Summer Love" is released as the fourth single from Songs of Experience.
- 31 August: The European leg of the Experience + Innocence Tour begins in Berlin, Germany.
- 13 November: The Experience + Innocence Tour concludes in Berlin.

== 2019 ==
- 8 November: The Joshua Tree Tour 2019, a continuation of the 2017 tour of the same name, begins in Auckland, New Zealand.
- 22 November: U2 release a non-album single titled "Ahimsa" with Indian musician A.R. Rahman to tie in with their first performance in India.
- 15 December: The Joshua Tree Tour 2019 concludes in Mumbai, India.

== 2020 ==
- 1 January: A 75-minute cut of the concert video eXPERIENCE + iNNOCENCE: Live in Berlin is screened on broadcast networks worldwide.
- 1 July: A permanent U2-X Radio station on Sirius XM satellite radio launches.
- September: U2's official YouTube channel is relaunched by YouTube, Island, Interscope, Universal Music Enterprises, and Universal Music Catalogue to support the remastering of the band's video catalogue to HD. Weekly releases commence on the channel, consisting of the band's music videos, behind-the-scenes footage, and unseen live videos.
- 30 October: All That You Can't Leave Behind is reissued on CD, vinyl, and digitally in commemoration of its 20th anniversary. The album was remastered and released in a Standard edition, a Deluxe edition, and a 51-track Super Deluxe edition.

== 2021 ==
- 15 March: An archival concert series called "The Virtual Road" is announced in partnership with YouTube. Four of U2's past concert films are remastered and streamed on the band's official YouTube channel for 48 hours each over the following weeks. The series began with U2 Go Home: Live from Slane Castle, Ireland on 17 March (St. Patrick's Day), followed by U2 Live at Red Rocks: Under a Blood Red Sky on 25 March, PopMart: Live from Mexico City on 1 April, and Innocence + Experience: Live in Paris on 10 April.
- 1 November: U2 join the social networking service TikTok and post a 30-second lyric video teasing the new song "Your Song Saved My Life".
- 3 November: U2 digitally release "Your Song Saved My Life" from the soundtrack to the animated musical film Sing 2, in which Bono voices the character Clay Calloway.
- 19 November: Achtung Baby is re-released in standard black vinyl and deluxe color vinyl editions to commemorate its 30th anniversary; a 50-track digital box set follows on 3 December.

== 2022 ==
- 9 April: Bono and the Edge record an acoustic rendition of "Walk On" for Global Citizen's Stand Up for Ukraine livestream, which was organised to urge world leaders to raise funds for Ukrainian refugees.
- 8 May: Bono and the Edge perform for 40 minutes in a Metro station in Kyiv, Ukraine, at the invitation of Volodymyr Zelenskyy.
- 6 October: Media outlets report that U2 are in discussions to sign with Irving and Jeffrey Azoff of Full Stop Management, following the end of Guy Oseary's nine-year tenure as the band's manager the week prior.
- 1 November: Bono's memoir, Surrender: 40 Songs, One Story, is released. The following day, he begins a 14-city book tour across North America and Europe called "Stories of Surrender" to promote it.
- 3 December: U2 receive Kennedy Center Honors in Washington, D.C., for their contributions to performing arts.

== 2023 ==
- 10 January: U2 announce that the album Songs of Surrender, a compilation of 40 re-recorded and reinterpreted songs from the group's back catalogue, will be released on 17 March 2023.
- 11 January: U2 release a re-recorded version of "Pride (In the Name of Love)" to promote Songs of Surrender.
- 27 January: U2 release a re-recorded version of "With or Without You" to promote Songs of Surrender.
- 7 February: Bono attends the 2023 State of the Union Address in Washington, D.C., as a guest of US President Joe Biden.
- 12 February: A Super Bowl LVII television advertisement announces that U2 will perform a concert residency to inaugurate Sphere in the Las Vegas Valley in autumn 2023. Named U2:UV Achtung Baby Live at Sphere, the residency is to be focused on the group's 1991 album Achtung Baby. The announcement confirms that Mullen will not participate in order to allow him to recuperate from surgery, marking the first time since 1978 that U2 will perform without him; Dutch drummer Bram van den Berg from the band Krezip is announced as his replacement. Earlier during the Super Bowl, a re-recorded version of "One" from Songs of Surrender soundtracks the NFL's presentation of the Walter Payton NFL Man of the Year Award.
- 3 March: U2 release a re-recorded version of "Beautiful Day" to promote Songs of Surrender.
- 17 March: Songs of Surrender is released. Additionally, the television documentary special Bono and The Edge: A Sort of Homecoming, With Dave Letterman is made available for streaming on Disney+; it documents Bono's and the Edge's travels around Dublin with David Letterman, as well as a concert performance at Ambassador Theatre.
- 16 April: Bono resumes the "Stories of Surrender" tour with the first of 11 shows for a residency at the Beacon Theatre in New York City.
- 24 April – 12 May: Concert dates and ticket sale details for U2:UV Achtung Baby Live at Sphere are announced. Initially, five dates from 29 September to 8 October are announced. The following day, seven additional dates are announced, spanning 11–25 October. Two days later, another five dates are announced, spanning 27 October to 4 November. On 12 May, eight additional shows are announced, spanning 1–16 December.
- 16–17 September: U2 film a music video for a Las Vegas-themed single called "Atomic City" that ties in to their residency at the Sphere. The shoot culminates at midnight at the Carousel Bar in front of the Plaza Hotel & Casino, where the group are met by a crowd that includes 250 extras.
- 29 September: U2 perform the first show of their U2:UV Achtung Baby Live at Sphere residency. The group also releases "Atomic City".
- 19 October: U2 announce that U2:UV Achtung Baby Live will be extended with 11 additional concerts running from 26 January to 18 February 2024, bringing the residency's total number of shows to 36.
- 4 December: U2 announce that U2:UV Achtung Baby Live will be extended for the final time with four additional concerts running from 23 February to 2 March 2024, bringing the residency's total length to 40 concerts. Ticket sales for the shows begin the following day.
- 16 December: U2 perform their last concert of the year at Sphere.

== 2024 ==
- 26 January: U2 resume U2:UV Achtung Baby Live at Sphere.
- 4 February: A performance of "Atomic City" from Sphere is included in the telecast of the 66th Annual Grammy Awards. After the performance, the band participate in an award presentation, announcing the winner for Best Pop Vocal Album.
- 21 February: The documentary film Kiss the Future is released theatrically with early screenings at select AMC theatres, followed by a wide release on 23 February. The film, featuring interviews with Bono, the Edge, and Clayton, documents U2's involvement with Sarajevo during the 1990s and their 1997 concert in the city.
- 1 March: Larry Mullen Jr. attends the penultimate show of U2:UV Achtung Baby Live at Sphere. The audience chants his name after Bono gives him a shout-out on stage.
- 2 March: U2 play the final concert of U2:UV Achtung Baby Live at Sphere.
- 5 April: U2 announce "To Love and Only Love – Deep Dives and B-Sides", a series of 12 remastered singles to be digitally re-released with their original B-sides and remixes.
- 30 August: U2 release a five-song live EP taken from an August 1993 performance called ZOO TV – Live in Dublin 1993.
- 5 September: V-U2 An Immersive Concert Film, which documents the band's Sphere residency, begins screening exclusively at Sphere.
- 26 September: U2 announce an upcoming reissue of How to Dismantle an Atomic Bomb for its 20th anniversary, which includes a companion album of tracks from the recording sessions called How to Re-Assemble an Atomic Bomb. Two tracks from that companion, "Country Mile" and "Picture of You (X+W)", are released as singles.
- 24 October: The song "Happiness" is released as a single from How to Re-Assemble an Atomic Bomb.
- 22 November: A remastered 20th anniversary edition of How to Dismantle an Atomic Bomb is reissued on vinyl, CD, cassette tape, and digitally. Coinciding with the release date, the band's Vertigo 2005: Live from Chicago concert video is livestreamed on YouTube.

== 2025 ==
- 4 January: Bono receives the Presidential Medal of Freedom from U.S. President Joe Biden.
- 12 April: U2 releases a 30th anniversary reissue of Original Soundtracks 1, their "Passengers" collaboration with Brian Eno, on vinyl for Record Store Day.
- 22 May: The members of U2 receive the Ivors Academy Fellowship in the UK for their songwriting, making them the first Irish songwriters to be so honoured.
- 30 May: Apple TV+ releases the documentary film Bono: Stories of Surrender, which covers Bono's solo performances from his 2022–2023 Stories of Surrender book tour. The film is also released as an Apple Immersive Video for the Apple Vision Pro headset, making it the first feature-length film to be released in the format. Coinciding with the film release, an abridged version of Bono's memoir that follows the narrative arc of the film is released in paperback under the title Bono: Stories of Surrender. An EP of the same name with live performances of three songs is released by Bono to coincide with the film's release.
- 21 October: Bono and the Edge accept the 2025 Woody Guthrie Prize at Cain's Ballroom in Tulsa, Oklahoma, on behalf of the band. The award is given for embodying the spirit of folk singer Woody Guthrie and using one's work to "serv[e] as a positive force for social change". Following the ceremony, Bono and the Edge perform a set of six songs.

== 2026 ==
- 18 February: U2 release the six-track EP Days of Ash, coinciding with Ash Wednesday. The EP is accompanied by a new digital issue of Propaganda, the band's official magazine.
- 3 April: U2 release the six-track EP Easter Lily, coinciding with Good Friday. The EP is accompanied by another digital issue of Propaganda.
- 12 May: U2 film a music video for the single "Street of Dreams" in a street in Mexico City.
- 14 May: Members of the band meet with the Mexican president Claudia Sheinbaum at the Street Child World Cup General Assembly.
- 18−21 May: The members of U2 are recognized as honoured members of the European Order of Merit by the European Parliament.
- 26 May: U2 announce that Sulinna Ong, a former executive at Spotify, has joined their management team as a partner.
- 18 June: Bono and the Edge perform "City of Blinding Lights" with Jacknife Lee at the opening ceremony of the Barack Obama Presidential Center.
- 7 July: U2 release the single "Street of Dreams" from their then-unannounced studio album Carnaval de Luz.
- 17 July: During Martin Garrix's performance at Tomorrowland, the Edge appears as a guest performer during the live debut of the song "Fireflies", a collaboration between Garrix and U2.
- 24 July: "Fireflies" is released as a single.
- 28 August: U2 release a cover of the Pogues' song "Yeah Yeah Yeah Yeah Yeah" for the Shane MacGowan tribute album 20th Century Paddy: The Songs of Shane MacGowan.
- 24 September: U2 announce their 16th studio album, Carnaval de Luz, and release the second single from it, "Silencio".
- 25 September: U2 commemorate the 50th anniversary of their first practice with performances at their alma mater Mount Temple Comprehensive School and from the balcony of Bewley's Cafe on Grafton Street. During the Mount Temple show, the band are accompanied by 32 student musicians for a performance of "One".
- 15 October: U2 announce the Greatest Show on Earth World Tour, with confirmed concerts in Mexico, Brasil and Argentina in 2027. The announcement is accompanied by the release of "The Greatest Show on Earth" as the third single from Carnaval de Luz.
- 13 November: Carnaval de Luz is released, and "Torn", featuring American singer Dolly Parton, is released as its fourth single. The album is accompanied by another digital issue of Propaganda.
- 14 November: U2 open the 2026 Rock and Roll Hall of Fame induction ceremony at the Peacock Theater in Los Angeles with a surprise performance.
- 25 November: U2 are scheduled to perform at SoFi Stadium in Inglewood, California, during the halftime show of the National Football League's first Thanksgiving eve game. The event will be streamed as part of NFL on Netflix's coverage.
