= U2 by U2 =

Book by U2

- Author: Bono, The Edge, Adam Clayton, Larry Mullen Jr. with Neil McCormick
- Subject: Autobiography
- Published: 2006 (HarperCollins)
- Publication place: England
- Pages: 345
- ISBN: 0-00-719668-7
- OCLC: 156786741

U2 by U2 is an autobiography written by the members of Irish rock band U2, first published in 2006, edited by Neil McCormick. It portrays the story of U2 in their own words and pictures.

== Background ==
U2 by U2 was inspired by The Beatles Anthology, a book released in October 2000 as part of The Beatles Anthology film project.

The book took over two years to complete and features more than 1,500 photographs taken from U2's personal archives, depicting the evolution from their early days in Dublin in 1978, to achieving rock superstar status. More than 150 hours of interviews were conducted by journalist Neil McCormick with singer Bono, guitarist The Edge, bassist Adam Clayton, drummer Larry Mullen Jr., and manager Paul McGuinness.

== Content ==
"We felt it was important to get the story on record, but that's not to say we're not going to go on a good many more years [...] [t]his is the story thus far."

— Adam Clayton

U2 by U2 is an oral history created by Neil McCormick with the band, an in depth look at U2 with more than 150 hours of interviews from the 1970s on. This large heavy book describes the band started by four teenagers in 1976, and is the first book by the entire band written in their own words. The focus of the book is their music, their relationships and the growth of the band throughout the years, and is told by the band members themselves and their manager, Paul McGuinness, each tell their own account of a specific event. It is organized chronologically, beginning with childhood stories that continue through the Vertigo tour. McCormick, edited the book with the band to compile hundreds of un-published photographs.

=== Summary ===
The book is divided into a prologue and twelve chapters. The prologue is structured in four sections, one on each member of the band, containing their views on what being in U2 means to the musicians. Bono talks about his personality, The Edge gives a review on electric guitars, Adam Clayton explains how he'd always wanted to be a rock star, and Larry Mullen Jr. expresses the fact that he had never been comfortable with celebrity or fame. Each one of the members also shares ideas about the others. The first chapter, 1960–75: Stories for Boys, follows their childhood stories with memories and photographs taken from their personal collections. The second chapter, 1976–78: Another Time Another Place, reconstructs the formation of the band and their initial equipment and gigs. The third chapter, 1978–80: Staring at the Sun, covers the punk period, when the band was influenced by emerging acts such as The Jam, The Clash, Buzzcocks, and Sex Pistols. The fourth chapter, 1980–81: Into the Heart, deals with the recording sessions of the band first two studio albums, Boy and October, and the filming of their first music video, "Gloria", written and directed by Meiert Avis.

The fifth chapter, 1982–83: Sing a New Song, talks about Bono's marriage to Ali Hewson, the release of U2's third studio album War and how "Sunday Bloody Sunday" became an anthem for peace. Chapter six, 1984-85: In the Name of Love, is about the release of The Unforgettable Fire. The second half of the book opens with 1986–87: Luminous Times, which talks about the release of The Joshua Tree, the band's most popular and critically acclaimed album. Chapter eight, 1987–89: Outside Is America, talks about the cinematic album and documentary Rattle and Hum.

The ninth chapter, 1990–93: Sliding Down the Surface of Things, is about a time when the band changed their sound. Bono and The Edge composed music for A Clockwork Orange: 2004, produced at the Barbican Theatre in London by the Royal Shakespeare Company, but it received mostly negative reviews. U2 released Achtung Baby and the accompanying Zoo TV Tour, and Zooropa and this, in part, spurned the desire to make changes to the way they made their music. Chapter ten, 1994–98: Some Days Are Better than Others, talks about the members of the band, especially Bono, dealing with the situation after coming back from tour, trying to find a routine life. Summer of 1994 is called by Bono as their [U2's] Summer of Love. In 1997, Pop was released.

The eleventh chapter, 1998–01: The Last of the Rock Stars, follows the release of All That You Can't Leave Behind and the death of Bono's father on 21 August 2001, a day after the band was due to play their first concert at Slane Castle for their Elevation Tour. The final chapter, 2002–06: Until the End of the World, opens with the band playing at the Super Bowl XXXVI in January 2002 for the halftime show. U2 played three songs, "Beautiful Day", "MLK", and "Where the Streets Have No Name" while the names of the victims from the September 11 attacks were projected onto a sheet behind the stage, and, at the conclusion of the last song, Bono opened his jacket to reveal an American flag printed into the lining. The experience was described by them as "terrifying". The book then deals with the releases of The Best of 1990–2000, which included two new songs from the Monaco sessions, "Electrical Storm" and "The Hands That Built America". The book concludes with anecdotes and circumstances taken from the recording sessions of How to Dismantle an Atomic Bomb and the following Vertigo Tour.

== Publication ==
U2 by U2 was first published by HarperCollins in London, England in 2006. It is a coffee table book, oversized and visually oriented. The first international edition was released on 22 September 2006 by the same publishing company. A lottery on U2's official website and competitions on radio stations across Ireland determined the 250 winners of a signed copy of the book. The promotional event took place at the Eason & Son bookshop at 40 Lower O'Connell Street in Dublin on 24 September 2006.

The book has been reprinted several times, and translated into French (translated by Philippe Paringaux and published by Au diable Vauvert in 2006 and 2008), Dutch (translated by Joost van der Meer and Asterisk* (Amsterdam), and published by Het Spectrum in 2006 and 2008), Danish (Danish title: U2 om U2; published by Ekstra Bladet in 2006), Finnish (translated by Veli-Pekka Saarinen and Elina Lustig, and published by Tammi in 2006), German (translated by Charlotte Lyne and published by Scherz in 2006), Italian (published by Rizzoli in 2006), Czech (Czech title: U2 o U2; published by Portál in 2007), and Polish (Polish title: U2 o U2; translated by Łukasz Głowacki and published by In Rock in 2009).

== Reception ==
The book received favourable critical reviews. Edna Gundersen praised it stating that "[they] now offers the definitive version of how [U2] got there." Entertainment Weekly's writer Michael Endelman wrote in his review of the book "[d]espite some fascinating details, the nearly 350 pages of as-told-to text is dense, sometimes sluggish", giving the book a B rating.

Its international release, on 22 September 2006, have made it a bestseller in the United States, and the best selling music book in the world for 2006. It was listed in USA Today's Best-Selling Books list for 9 weeks, debuting on 5 October 2006 and peaking at number 30, and on The New York Times list of best sellers in the nonfiction category for 6 weeks, from November 2006 until January 2007, and peaking at number 14.

It is a recommended book by the Irish America magazine. UnRated Magazine's journalist Trent McMartin in his 2008 review of the book wrote: "[f]ascinating, revealing, and at times long-winded, the most intriguing areas of the book are the early stages as the band struggles with youth, rejection, spirituality and upheaval at home. [...] [O]n the most part the band is in sequence despite the years, and in some cases decades of discrepancy. [...] [T]his passionate and insightful book is a joy regardless of its tendency to drift. A few chapters in, and you two will be waving the white flag and wearing a pair of fly shades."

== See also ==
- Timeline of U2
