= Atomic City (U2 song) =

Single by U2
- Released: 29 September 2023
- Studio: Sound City (Los Angeles)
- Genre: Rock
- Length: 3:30
- Label: Island
- Composers: U2; Debbie Harry; Giorgio Moroder
- Lyricist: Bono
- Producers: Jacknife Lee; Steve Lillywhite

U2 singles chronology
"Your Song Saved My Life" (2021)	"Atomic City" (2023)	"Picture of You (X+W)" (2024)

"Atomic City" is a song by Irish rock band U2, released as a single on 29 September 2023 through Island Records. It was produced by Jacknife Lee and Steve Lillywhite, and was recorded at Sound City Studios. The song was written as a promotional tie-in to the band's U2:UV Achtung Baby Live concert residency at Sphere in the Las Vegas Valley, and it was released the same day the residency began.

The band described the track as a musical homage to artists such as Blondie, Giorgio Moroder, and the Clash as well as post-punk music of the 1970s; co-writing credits for "Atomic City" were given to Debbie Harry and Moroder due to its chorus sharing similarities with Blondie's "Call Me". Lyrically, the song makes references to Las Vegas, with the title taken from the city's nickname from the 1950s when it was a destination for nuclear tourism. It was U2's first new song since "Your Song Saved My Life" from the soundtrack of the animated musical Sing 2 in 2021.

Despite being absent from the residency in order to recuperate from surgery, drummer Larry Mullen Jr. performed on the track and was filmed for its music video, which was shot in Las Vegas and directed by Ben Kutchins. It was nominated for the 2024 MTV Video Music Award for Best Rock Video.

== Writing and recording ==
U2's lead vocalist Bono described the song as an "invitation to [their] audience", likening it to a "come-all-ye", a type of traditional Irish ballad. Bono said that the song was partially inspired by the story of a European priest who explored Las Vegas and the band's imagining that he had visions for the future.

The song was recorded at Sound City Studios in Los Angeles at the wishes of U2's guitarist the Edge. Their drummer Larry Mullen Jr. performed on the track, despite sitting out the band's U2:UV Achtung Baby Live at Sphere residency to recuperate from surgery. The night before the band recorded the song, Mullen visited the studio and played drums to gauge how long he would be physically able to participate; his drum technician said that Mullen loved the sound of the studio so much that he ended up playing for three hours. Bono said that Mullen "played up a storm".

== Release ==
"Atomic City" was released digitally on 29 September 2023, the same day their residency at Sphere began. It was also released on limited-edition CD and 7-inch vinyl formats.

Three electronic dance remixes of the song have been released. In December 2023, one by Mike WiLL Made-It was issued, followed by a remix by David Guetta in February 2024 and one by Tiësto in June 2024.

For Record Store Day 2024, U2 released a vinyl pressing of "Atomic City", consisting of a live version of the song recorded at Sphere and the remix by Mike WiLL Made-It.

== Music video ==
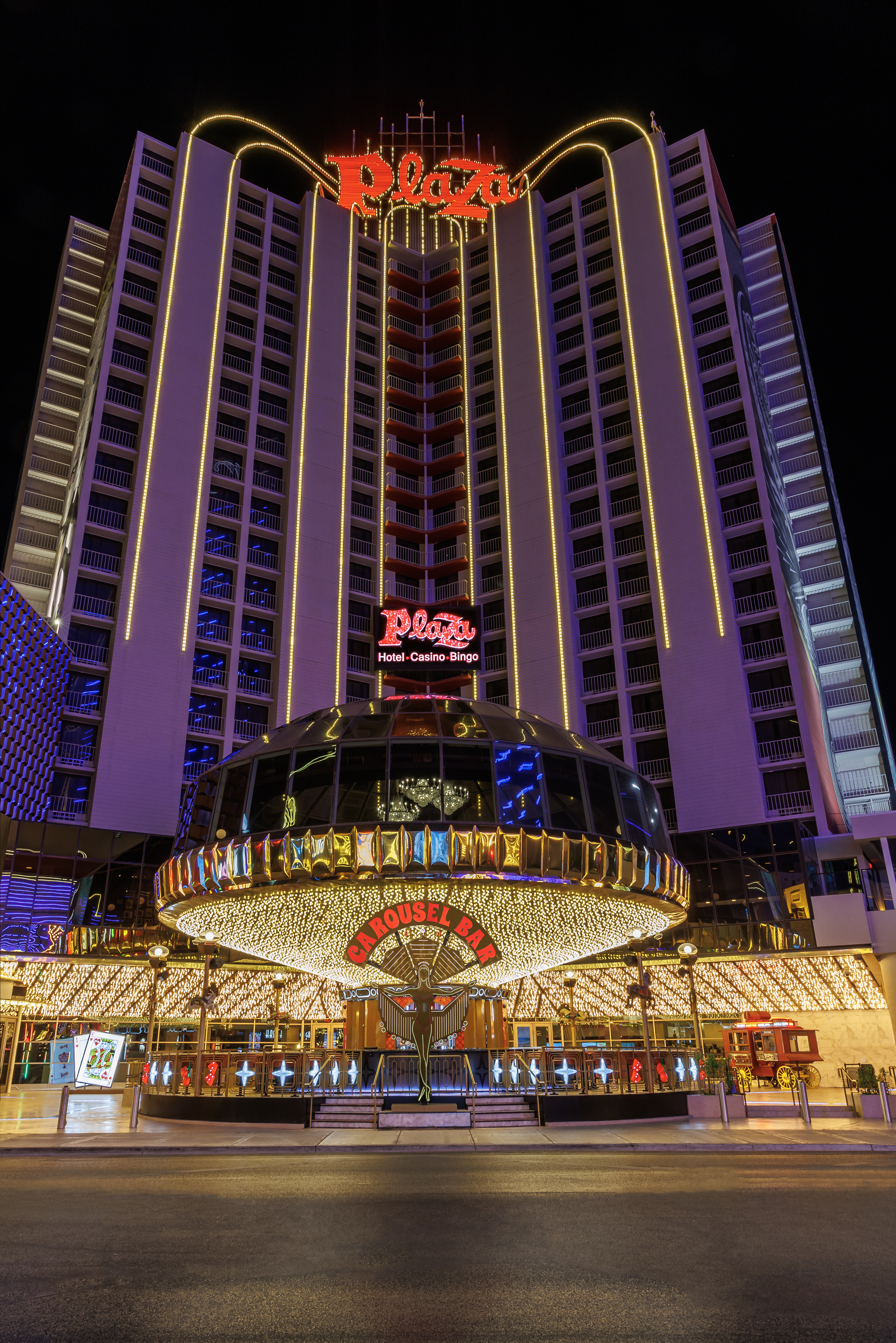
The Plaza Hotel & Casino, where U2's video shoot for "Atomic City" culminated

The music video for "Atomic City" was directed by Ben Kutchins and shot in Las Vegas beginning on 16 September 2023. With the members of U2 set up on a moving flatbed truck, the shoot began at the 3rd Street Stage on Fremont Street and culminated at midnight at the Carousel Bar in front of the Plaza Hotel & Casino, where the group were met by a crowd that included 250 extras. In addition to several takes of "Atomic City", U2 performed "I Still Haven't Found What I'm Looking For", whose music video had been filmed in the city on Fremont Street in 1987. Mullen participated in the video shoot, despite being absent from the concert residency. The video was nominated for the 2024 MTV Video Music Award for Best Rock Video.

== Reception ==
Neil McCormick of The Telegraph said that "Atomic City" was "an enticing start" to the band's residency at the Sphere. McCormick added that "On superficial listen, this upbeat, anthemic rocker might come across as a fun but cliched homage to the bright lights of the gambling mecca", but judged that the lyrics had more depth upon further analysis. Pat Carty of Hot Press said, "'Atomic City' despite its gorgeous middle eight isn't much of a song." Steven Hyden of Uproxx said that the song "borrows liberally from Blondie's 'Call Me' and reads like an attempt to re-write two of the biggest (and worst) U2 hits of the last 25 years, 'Elevation' and 'Vertigo'". Chris DeVille of Stereogum called "Atomic City" the band's latest single to "chas[e] the ghost of 'Vertigo'", describing it as "a hard-grooving, competent song that nonetheless has me feeling like I still haven't found what I'm looking for". Spin called it "a straight-ahead rocker that would fit in on any of U2's post-2000s albums". Charlotte Krol of NME said that with the song, U2 "returned to the post-punk of their heyday with a stirring guitar hook reminiscent of their 1983 hit 'Sunday Bloody Sunday' and a chorus that channels Blondie". Relix said, "The high-octane feel on the song serves as the perfect precursor to the opening of Las Vegas' newest attraction, The Sphere".

Ultimate Classic Rock ranked "Atomic City" the 28th-best rock song of 2023. Exclaim! listed the single's cover image as the worst of the year, writing: "The single was released to promote the band's Las Vegas residency at the $2.3 billion Sphere, so the fact that the cover artwork looks this cheap feels like an insult. That Larry Mullen Jr. is wearing a punk T-shirt feels almost like he's daring us to call out their capitalist excess, so here goes: this stinks."

== Chart performance ==
In the United States, "Atomic City" garnered 1.1 million official streams and 3,329 copies sold in its first week, according to Luminate. It debuted at number one on Billboard's Alternative Digital Song Sales chart, U2's first time atop the chart since its inception in 2011.

"Atomic City" also appeared on other Billboard charts to set or extend several records for U2. On the Alternative Airplay chart, the song peaked at number 15, extending the group's record for songs on the chart to 43; this made U2 just the third act to appear on the Alternative Airplay chart in every decade since its inception in 1988, alongside Red Hot Chili Peppers and Depeche Mode. The song also peaked at number 35 on the Mainstream Rock Airplay chart, extending U2's record of songs on the chart to 51; this made U2 the seventh act to appear on the chart in every decade since its inception in 1981.

"Atomic City" reached number one on the Adult Alternative Airplay chart, the band's 14th song to do so, surpassing Coldplay for the most ever. It was also U2's 27th song to reach the top ten of the chart, setting a new record, and it was their 32nd song overall to appear on the chart, the second-most ever. On the Rock & Alternative Airplay chart, the song debuted at number five, U2's highest peak on the chart since its inception in 2009; the song accrued 3.7 million impressions from radio audiences during the week of 29 September to 5 October, according to Luminate.

== Live performances ==
U2 performed "Atomic City" during their 2023–2024 U2:UV Achtung Baby residency at Sphere. For performances, a computer-generated recreation of the Las Vegas skyline at night was displayed on the venue's interior LED screen. Progressively, the buildings were deconstructed in a reverse time-lapse, until only the empty desert remained. The idea for the visuals came from Bono, who wanted the LED screen to depict the exterior surroundings of the Sphere and create the illusion that the building had disappeared. A team of 20 artists at the visual effects studio Industrial Light & Magic (ILM) created the sequence over four months.

A performance of "Atomic City" at Sphere by U2 was included in the telecast of the 66th Annual Grammy Awards on 4 February 2024, in what was billed as the first-ever televised performance from the venue. After the performance, the band participated in an award presentation, announcing that the winner for Best Pop Vocal Album was Taylor Swift for Midnights.

== Personnel ==
U2

- Bono – lead vocals
- Adam Clayton – bass guitar
- The Edge – guitar, backing vocals
- Larry Mullen Jr. – drums

Additional personnel

- Chris Bellman – mastering
- CJ Eiriksson – engineering
- Tom Elmhirst – mixing
- Adam Hong – assistant mixing
- Jacknife Lee – backing vocals, production, engineering
- Steve Lillywhite – production

== Charts ==
=== Weekly charts ===
Weekly chart performance for "Atomic City"
Chart (2023–24)	Peak position
Ireland (IRMA)	64
Italy Airplay (EarOne)	14
Japan Hot Overseas (Billboard Japan)	11
Netherlands (Single Tip)	30
Netherlands (Tipparade)	20
New Zealand Hot Singles (RMNZ)	33
San Marino (SMRRTV Top 50)	14
Slovakia Airplay (ČNS IFPI)	82
UK Singles Downloads (Official Charts)	10
UK Singles Sales (OCC)	11
US Adult Pop Airplay (Billboard)	19
US Hot Rock & Alternative Songs (Billboard)	38
US Rock & Alternative Airplay (Billboard)	5

=== Year-end charts ===
2024 year-end chart performance for "Atomic City"
Chart (2024)	Position
US Rock Airplay (Billboard)	31
