= Bill Graham (author) =

Irish journalist (1951-1996)

- Born: 1951; Ireland
- Died: 11 May 1996 (aged 44)
- Occupation: Journalist

Bill Graham (1951 – 11 May 1996) was an Irish journalist and author. In addition to authoring several books, Graham wrote for Hot Press magazine from its founding. Hot Press editor and Graham's longtime colleague Niall Stokes described him as "a founding father of modern Irish music." Similarly, John Waters wrote that he was "the first Irish writer to write about the connection between Irish political culture and Irish rock'n'roll." He is credited with discovering U2.

== Biography ==
Graham attended Blackrock College and Trinity College, Dublin.

Graham was instrumental in the formation of Irish rock band U2, having brought them to the attention of Paul McGuinness, who became their manager. John Waters observed Graham's tremendous influence on the band: "It is often said that Bill 'discovered' U2. This is untrue. Bill created U2, through his enthusiasm for them. He gave them a reflection of their own possibilities and they only looked back that once." Graham wrote enthusiastically about the band, giving them their first exposure.

Jim Carroll credits Graham as inspiring him to become a music writer.

He died of a heart attack at 44 on 11 May 1996, outliving his mother Eileen. He resided in Howth. His funeral drew many of biggest bands from the world of Irish music including Clannad, Altan, U2 and Hothouse Flowers, along with singers Simon Carmody and Gavin Friday.

== Bibliography ==
- 1986: Stokes, Niall; Graham, Bill. U2: in the name of love : a history from Ireland's Hot press magazine. Harmony Books.
- 1987: Enya: The Latest Score in Hot Press
- 2004: Graham, Bill; Boer, Caroline van Oosten de. U2: The Complete Guide to Their Music. Omnibus Press. ISBN 978-0-7119-9886-5.

== See also ==
- List of writers on popular music
- Timeline of U2
