= Your Song Saved My Life =

Single by U2

from the album Sing 2: Original Motion Picture Soundtrack
- Released: 3 November 2021
- Length: 3:30
- Label: Island
- Composers: Bono; the Edge; Adam Clayton; Larry Mullen Jr.
- Lyricist: Bono
- Producers: Declan Gaffney; Jacknife Lee; Martijn Garritsen

U2 singles chronology
"Ahimsa" (2019)	"Your Song Saved My Life" (2021)	"Atomic City" (2023)

"Your Song Saved My Life" is a song by the Irish rock band U2. It was released as a single on 3 November 2021 and was written for the animated musical comedy movie Sing 2, in which lead vocalist Bono appears as a voice actor. The band's first original track since 2019, it was described by Bono as autobiographical: "There's a part of me that would die without that form of expression, because somebody said as a performer, insecurity is your best security. Any great performer is lacking something." A prominent inspiration for the track was the list of "60 Songs That Saved My Life" compiled by Bono at the time of his 60th birthday.

== Reception ==
In a review of the song entitled "U2's 'Your Song Saved My Life' is Possibly the Worst Song of the Year", Wren Graves of Consequence called the song a "treacly mess" whose melody "makes AM adult contemporary sound like a nonstop thrill ride." Conversely, Ed Power of The Irish Times stated the song "ticks many classic-U2 boxes by being epic and very, very sincere."

The track was shortlisted for Best Original Song at the 94th Academy Awards.

== Charts ==
Weekly chart performance for "Your Song Saved My Life"
Chart (2021–2022)	Peak position
Belgium (Ultratop 50 Wallonia)	41
Italy Airplay (EarOne)	26
Netherlands (Nationale Airplay Top 50)	33
San Marino (SMRRTV Top 50)	34
US Adult Alternative Airplay (Billboard)	34
