= Paul McGuinness =

Irish businessman, music publisher and manager of U2

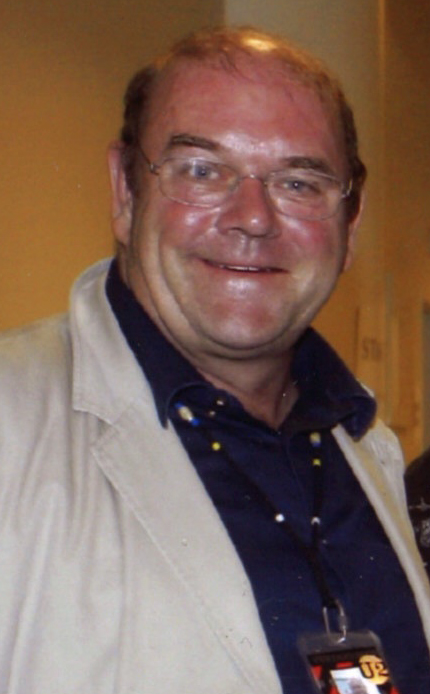
- McGuinness in 2005

Background information
- Born: 16 June 1951 (age 74) Rinteln, West Germany (now Germany)
- Occupation: Talent manager
- Years active: 1970s–present

Paul McGuinness (born 16 June 1951) is an Irish talent manager. He was the founder of Principle Management Limited, a popular music act management company based in Dublin, Ireland. He was the manager of the rock band U2 from 1978 to 2013.

== Early life ==
McGuinness was born in a British military hospital at Rinteln, Westphalia in Germany, where his father, Philip McGuinness (a Liverpudlian) was serving with the Royal Air Force. His mother Sheila McGuinness née Lyne, was a schoolteacher from County Kerry, Ireland. There were three children in the family: Paul, Niall, and Katy.

McGuinness received his early formal education in Ireland at the private Jesuit boarding school Clongowes Wood College. From there he went on to Trinity College Dublin, where he directed plays, edited the magazine T.C.D. Miscellany, and promoted gigs, but dropped out without a degree.

== Career ==
=== Early years ===
Before becoming involved with U2, he worked as a film assistant director on productions such as John Boorman's Zardoz. For a time, he also managed folk-rock group Spud.

=== U2 ===
McGuinness first met U2 at a Dublin gig on 25 May 1978 where they were supporting the Gamblers. Following this meeting, McGuinness became U2's manager, having been introduced to the band by Bill Graham, a journalist with Hot Press magazine.

He founded Principle Management Limited on 29 March 1984.

His original agreement with the band was that the money would be split equally 5 ways, though this was changed later.

McGuinness and Bill Whelan set up a music publishing company called McGuinness/Whelan Publishing in the late 1980s. Whelan later composed the music for Riverdance.

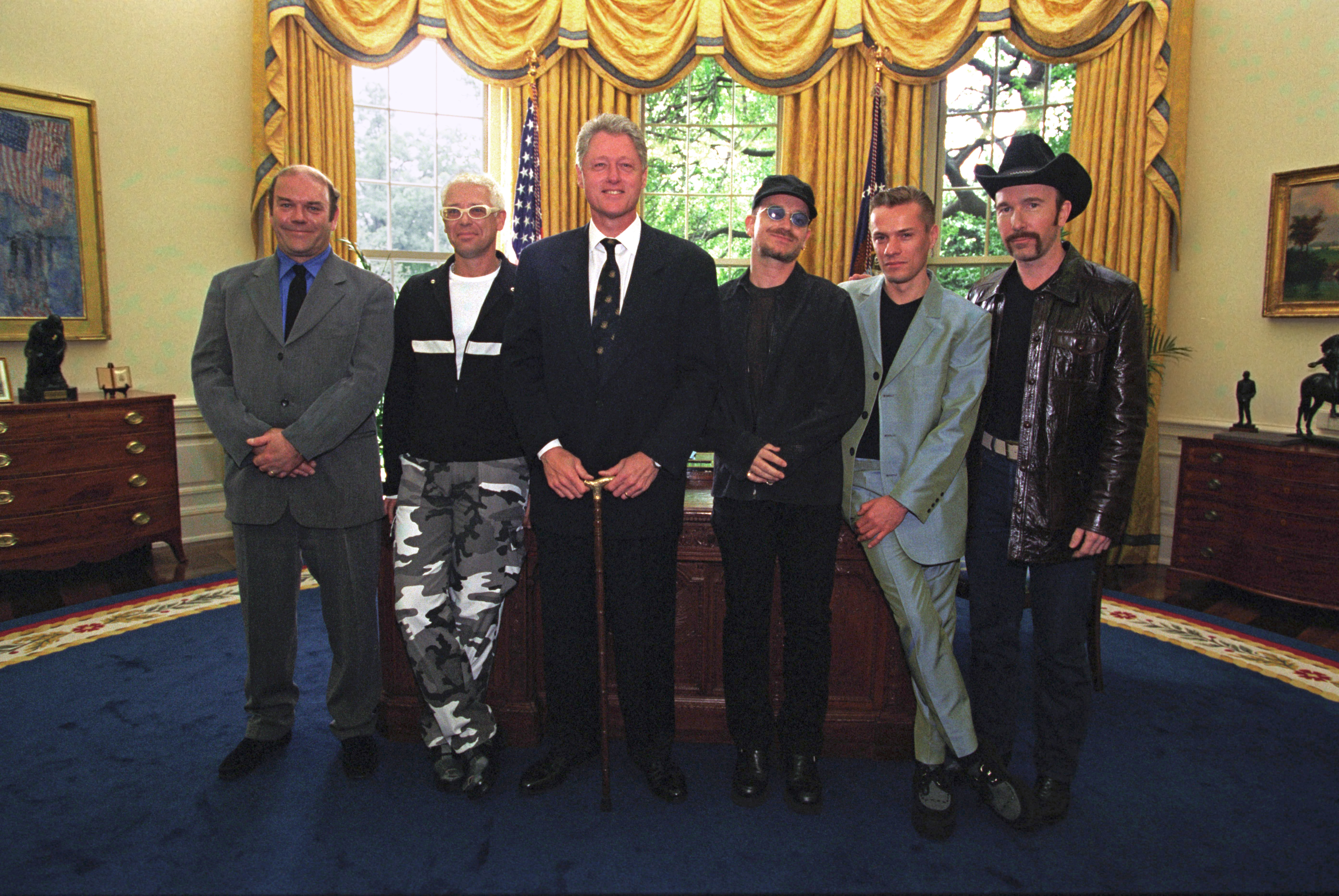
McGuinness (left) with U2 and US President Bill Clinton in the Oval Office in 1997

In 2002, McGuinness was presented with a Lifetime Achievement Award at the Meteor Music Awards at Point Theatre Dublin and U2 won the best Irish Band Award.

Noted for his business acumen, he has been responsible for U2 3D concert films, U2-branded iPods, sponsorship from BlackBerry and the first-ever concert streamed live on YouTube.

McGuinness was regarded as the fifth member of U2, although in an interview with The Irish Press in 1985, when asked if he was the fifth member of U2, he replied "the fifth member of U2 is in Adam (Clayton)'s trousers". He is also regarded as one of the most successful managers in the music business.

McGuinness stepped down as manager of U2 after 34 years on 13 November 2013, with Madonna's manager Guy Oseary succeeding him in 2014 when he sold Principle to Live Nation.

== Other activities ==
He was a founding partner of TV3 (Ireland) and was one of the owners of Ardmore Film Studios.

He became a member of the Arts Council of Ireland on 1 January 1988, having been appointed by Charles Haughey and served until February 2000 when he resigned.

He has been an advocate on behalf of artists, record labels, and music publishers. On 28 January 2008, in a speech at the Midem music industry convention in Cannes, McGuinness specifically accused companies such as Apple, Google, Yahoo!, and Facebook of building "multi-billion dollar industries on the back of our content without paying for it".

In 2015, he founded Primo Productions, a film and TV company. Primo has produced 3 Seasons of Riviera, a drama set in the South of France. McGuinness wrote the "list of ingredients" for the show: "Rich people behaving badly in the sun, yachts, Maseratis, great clothes, beautiful women, art fraud, money laundering through the auction houses, Russians, English people, American, French. Murder, adultery". Everyday life on the Côte d’Azur. McGuinness's production partner is Kris Thykier of Archery Pictures. The show was originally commissioned by Anne Mensah of SKY Atlantic.

== Personal life ==
McGuinness married Kathy Gilfillan in 1977. They met whilst he was studying at Trinity. Gilfillan is director of The Lilliput Press.
