= Sing 2 (soundtrack) =

Sing 2: Original Motion Picture Soundtrack

Soundtrack album by Joby Talbot
- Released: December 17, 2021
- Genres: Pop; R&B; rock
- Length: 1:05:08
- Label: Republic
- Producer: Garth Jennings

Joby Talbot chronology
Sing: Original Motion Picture Soundtrack (2016)	Sing 2: Original Motion Picture Soundtrack (2021)	Wonka: Original Motion Picture Soundtrack (2023)

Singles from Sing 2
- 1. "Your Song Saved My Life" Released: November 3, 2021; 2. "Suéltate" Released: November 15, 2021; 3. "Christmas (Baby Please Come Home)" Released: November 29, 2021

Sing 2: Original Motion Picture Soundtrack is the soundtrack to the animated film Sing 2, released on December 17, 2021, by Republic Records. The film is a sequel to the animated musical comedy film Sing. All 21 of the included songs were performed diegetically by the film’s recurring cast members, including Reese Witherspoon, Scarlett Johansson, Taron Egerton, Tori Kelly, and Nick Kroll. The soundtrack also features popular songs originally performed by Kiana Ledé, BTS, Sam i, Billie Eilish, Elton John, Kygo, Whitney Houston, Anitta, and Mercury Rev.

U2 performed the film's original song "Your Song Saved My Life", which was released on November 3, 2021. The music video for the song was released on November 13 as a collaborative partnership between the artist, label and production studios, to support Education Through Music (ETM), a non-profit organization, based on Los Angeles that "aims to help provide music as a core subject for children in under-resourced schools across North America". An official website was also launched to market the track. "Suéltate" performed by Sam i and featuring Anitta, BIA and Jarina De Marco was released as the second single on November 15. The album further features an original song "Tippy Toes" by Adam Buxton, Fancy Feelings and DSCOSTU, which is a bonus track featured in the film. Another bonus track, "Christmas (Baby Please Come Home)" a cover of the 1963 version (by Darlene Love) rendered by the film's cast was released on November 29, as a single. The album also features a remixed version of the track "Soy Yo" by Bomba Estéreo.

The album was positively received and it debuted on number 41 at the Billboard 200 charts, and number 2 at the Billboard soundtrack albums. It further topped the British Album Charts upon release, finishing second behind Encanto. The album was also nominated for several awards, including the Billboard Music Award for Top Soundtrack which was lost to Encanto.

== Background ==
"It can't just be a song that's popular or one you like. It has to be super, it has to work, it has to do a job. Because if you just chase popularity you'll come out stuck because it won't be popular next week. It has to do that thing of feeling right, and emotionally serving the story at that point, even if it's a humorous thing."

— Garth Jennings, in an interview to RogerEbert.com on the usage of popular songs

The film's director, Garth Jennings, acted as the executive producer on the soundtrack. The songs were picked regarding the mood of the characters and their intentions, with "I Still Haven't Found What I'm Looking For" (a song performed by U2) used as it "fits the emotional resolution of that film" and Bomba Estéreo's "Soy Yo" is played when "characters are at their lowest moment, and they have to jump out the window to escape the thugs that are pursuing them". Jennings, added that the track is a "real declaration of independence" which had the "joyful defiance that fits that point". U2's frontman and lead vocalist Bono made his voice acting debut through this film, voicing Clay Calloway, a middle-aged lion. On approaching Bono, Jennings said, "We reached out to him and were waiting for the call to tell us he's too busy doing other stuff or a 'No thank you,' but they said he'd call us in 45 minutes. We had a chat on the phone, and it turned out he loved the first film. He'd been struck by how much we all loved music; we didn't just drop it in. It was loved and used in a precise way." Halsey recorded the track "Could Have Been Me" at her home studio. Tori Kelly and Nick Kroll opined that the film and its songs "enriches kids' knowledge in music".

== Commercial performance ==
The soundtrack debuted at UK Compilation Chart on the 85th position upon December 17, 2021. It made a re-entry on January 7, 2022, at the 91st position and jumped to 46th on the following week, and maintained its upward trend until it reached the 3rd position on February 4 (a week after its release on January 28). As of February 25, 2022, the album peaked at second position behind Encanto. It also topped at the 5th position in UK Album Downloads Chart and 2nd position in UK Soundtracks, according to Official Charts Company. It was further listed in Billboard 200 and Billboard Soundtracks.

== Release history ==
The album was digitally and physically released on December 17, 2021. A vinyl edition of the soundtrack was published by Target Corporation and was exclusively made available for purchase on January 21, 2022. Another vinyl edition was released on January 28. A Japanese edition of the soundtrack was released on February 25, along with an alternative edition, with four tracks being excluded from the original track list.

== Track listing ==
Sing 2: Original Motion Picture Soundtrack
No.	Title	Writer(s)	Performer(s)	Length
1.	"Your Song Saved My Life"	Paul Hewson; David Evans; Adam Clayton; Larry Mullen Jr.	U2	3:31
2.	"Let's Go Crazy"	Prince Nelson	Tori Kelly, Taron Egerton, Reese Witherspoon and Nick Kroll	3:09
3.	"Can't Feel My Face"	Abel Tesfaye; Max Martin; Savan Kotecha; Peter Svensson; Ali Payami	Kiana Ledé	3:21
4.	"Goodbye Yellow Brick Road"	John; Bernie Taupin	Elton John	3:14
5.	"Heads Will Roll"	Yeah Yeah Yeahs	Scarlett Johansson	3:36
6.	"Holes"	Jonathan Donahue; Steve Mackowiak	Mercury Rev	5:54
7.	"Bad Guy"	Eilish; Finneas O'Connell	Billie Eilish	3:12
8.	"Sing 2 Audition Medley (Note: Medley songs are "...Ready for It?", "My Name Is", 'Abracadabra", "She Bangs", "Bury a Friend", "Hotline Bling", and "Cake by the Ocean".)"		Sing 2 Cast	1:47
9.	"Where the Streets Have No Name"	Hewson; Evans; Clayton; Mullen Jr.	Tori Kelly, Taron Egerton, Scarlett Johansson, Reese Witherspoon, and Nick Kroll	2:36
10.	"Higher Love"	Steve Winwood; Will Jennings	Kygo and Whitney Houston	3:48
11.	"There's Nothing Holdin' Me Back"	Shawn Mendes; Teddy Geiger; Scott Harris; Geoff Warburton	Tori Kelly and Taron Egerton	3:23
12.	"Suéltate"	Sam Spiegel; Jarina De Marco; Bianca Landrau; Abby Keen	Sam i featuring Anitta, Bia and Jarina De Marco	3:30
13.	"Stuck in a Moment You Can't Get Out Of"	Hewson; Evans	Scarlett Johansson	3:39
14.	"Soy Yo" (Sing 2 Mix)	Federico Ochoa; Ricky Reed; Joe London; Liliana Ávila	Bomba Estéreo	2:57
15.	"A Sky Full of Stars"	Coldplay; Tim Bergling	Taron Egerton	3:26
16.	"Could Have Been Me"	Rick Parkhouse; Adam Slack; Luke Spiller; George Tizzard; Josh Wilkinson	Halsey	2:28
17.	"I Say a Little Prayer"	Burt Bacharach; Hal David	Tori Kelly and Pharrell Williams	2:09
18.	"Break Free"	Anton Zaslavski; Martin; Kotecha	Witherspoon: Kroll	1:34
19.	"I Still Haven't Found What I'm Looking For"	Hewson; Evans; Clayton; Mullen Jr.	Scarlett Johansson and Bono	3:01
20.	"Tippy Toes" (Bonus track)	Joseph Park; Jakops; Rachel West; Hwaji	Adam Buxton and Fancy Feelings with DSCOSTU	2:08
21.	"Christmas (Baby Please Come Home) (Note: Exclusively in a Christmas commercial from Comcast.)" (Bonus track)	Phil Spector; Jeff Barry; Ellie Greenwich	Keke Palmer, Tori Kelly, Taron Egerton, Reese Witherspoon, and Scarlett Johansson	2:36
Total length:				65:08

Sing 2: Original Motion Picture Soundtrack — Alternative version (Note: All songs from the original track list are featured in the Japanese version, save for the alternative version, which excluded four tracks and included the previous tracks.)
No.	Title	Performer(s)	Length
1.	"Your Song Saved My Life"	U2	3:31
2.	"Let's Go Crazy"	Kelly; Egerton; Witherspoon; Kroll	3:09
3.	"Can't Feel My Face"	Ledé	3:21
4.	"Heads Will Roll"	Johansson	3:36
5.	"Sing 2 Audition Medley"	Sing 2 Cast	1:47
6.	"Where the Streets Have No Name"	Kelly; Egerton; Johansson; Witherspoon; Kroll	2:36
7.	"There's Nothing Holdin' Me Back"	Kelly; Egerton	3:23
8.	"Suéltate"	Sam i; Anitta; BIA; De Marco	3:30
9.	"Stuck in a Moment You Can't Get Out Of"	Johansson	3:39
10.	"Soy Yo" (Sing 2 Mix)	Bomba Estéreo	2:57
11.	"A Sky Full of Stars"	Egerton	3:26
12.	"Could Have Been Me"	Halsey	2:28
13.	"I Say a Little Prayer"	Kelly; Williams	2:09
14.	"Break Free"	Witherspoon; Kroll	1:34
15.	"I Still Haven't Found What I'm Looking For"	Johansson; Bono	3:01
16.	"Tippy Toes" (Bonus track)	Buxton; Fancy Feelings; DSCOSTU	2:08
17.	"Christmas (Baby Please Come Home)" (Bonus track)	Palmer; Kelly; Egerton; Witherspoon; Johansson	2:36
18.	"Stuck In A Moment You Can't Get Out Of" (Japanese version)	Masami Nagasawa	1:41
19.	"A Sky Full of Stars" (Japanese version)	Takuya Ohashi	3:26
20.	"Could Have Been Me" (Japanese version)	Aina the End	2:28
21.	"Break Free" (Japanese version)	Maaya Sakamoto; Tsukasa Saito	1:32
Total length:			58:09

Sing 2: Original Motion Picture Soundtrack — Japanese version
No.	Title	Performer(s)	Length
22.	"Stuck In A Moment You Can't Get Out Of"	Nagasawa	1:41
23.	"A Sky Full of Stars"	Ohashi	3:26
24.	"Could Have Been Me"	Aina the End	2:28
25.	"Break Free"	Sakamoto; Saito	1:32
Total length:			74:15

== Charts ==
=== Weekly charts ===
Weekly chart performance for Sing 2
Chart (2021–2022)	Peak position
Australian Albums (ARIA)	9
Austrian Albums (Ö3 Austria)	65
Belgian Albums (Ultratop Flanders)	80
Belgian Albums (Ultratop Wallonia)	134
Canadian Albums (Billboard)	59
Japanese Albums (Oricon)	20
New Zealand Albums (RMNZ)	31
Swiss Albums (Schweizer Hitparade)	86
UK Compilation Albums (OCC)	2
UK Downloads Chart (OCC)	5
UK Soundtrack Albums (OCC)	2
US Billboard 200	41
US Soundtrack Albums (Billboard)	2

=== Year-end charts ===
2022 year-end chart performance for Sing 2
Chart (2022)	Position
Australian Albums (ARIA)	85
US Billboard 200	177
US Soundtrack Albums (Billboard)	4

2023 year-end chart performance for Sing 2
Chart (2023)	Position
US Soundtrack Albums (Billboard)	18

== Certifications ==
Certifications for Sing 2
Region	Certification	Certified units/sales
United Kingdom (BPI)	Gold	100,000^{‡}
^{‡} Sales+streaming figures based on certification alone.

== Accolades ==
Accolades for Sing 2: Original Motion Picture Soundtrack
Award	Date of ceremony	Category	Recipient(s)	Result	Ref.
Hollywood Music in Media Awards	November 17, 2021	Best Music Supervisor(s) – Film	Mike Knobloch, Rachel Levy	Nominated	
Hollywood Music in Media Awards	November 17, 2021	Best Original Song – Animated Film	"Your Song Saved My Life" – U2	Nominated	
Hollywood Music in Media Awards	November 17, 2021	Best Soundtrack Album	Sing 2: Original Motion Picture Soundtrack	Nominated	
Billboard Music Awards	May 15, 2022	Top Soundtrack	Sing 2: Original Motion Picture Soundtrack	Nominated	

== See also ==
- Sing: Original Motion Picture Soundtrack
