= List of songs recorded by U2 =

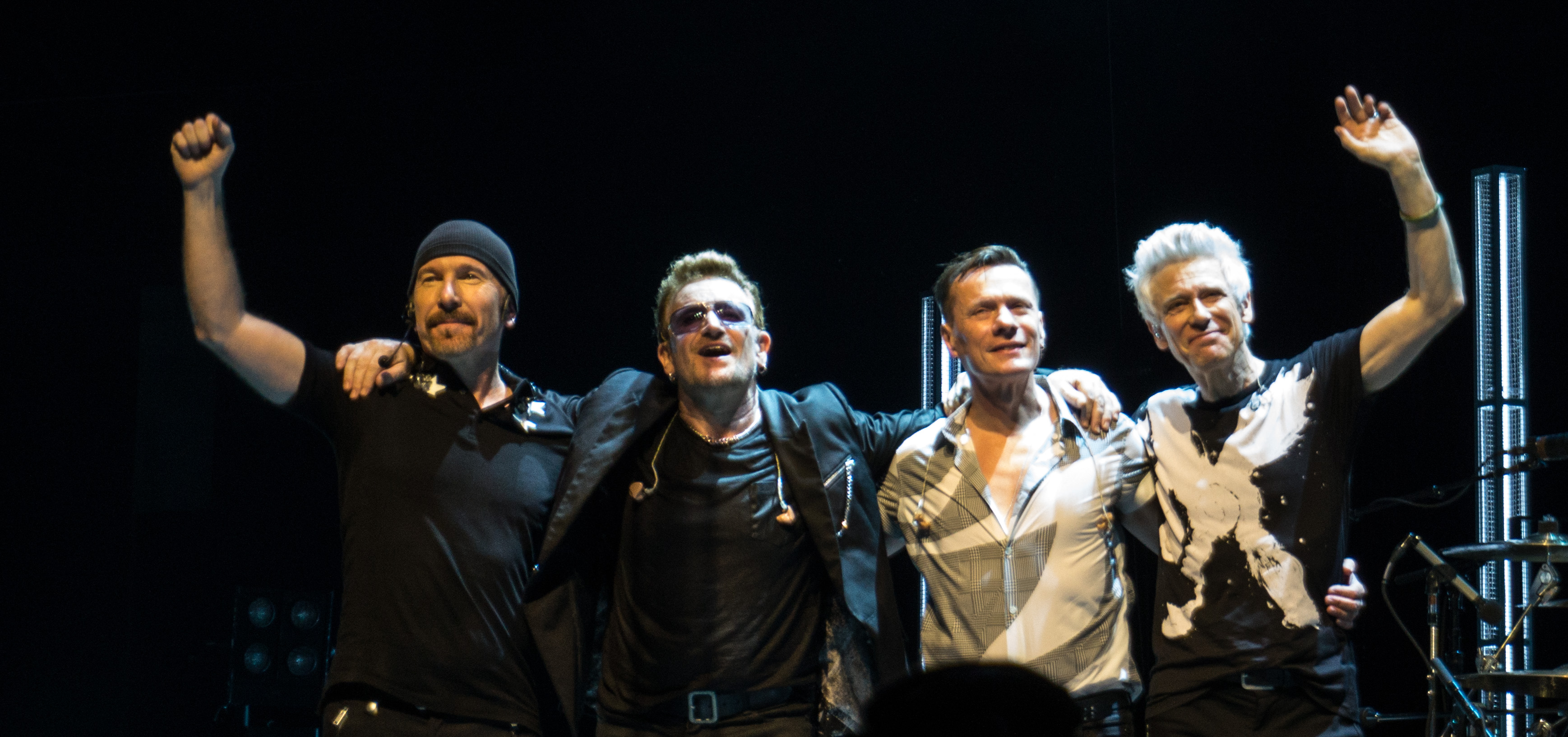
U2 live in Glasgow in 2015. L–R: The Edge, Bono, Larry Mullen Jr. and Adam Clayton

U2 are an Irish rock band from Dublin. The band formed in 1976 and released their debut EP Three in 1979 exclusively in Ireland. Following the release of their single "Another Day" in 1980, U2 signed a recording contract with Island Records, and released their first album, Boy, later that year. The band has since released 15 full-length studio albums, the most recent being Songs of Surrender in 2023. As of 2026, U2 have released 310 songs.

== Songs ==
Key
†	Released as a commercial single
‡	Released as a commercial non-album single

Name of song, writer(s), original release and year of release
Song	Writer(s)	Original release	Year	Ref.	Notes
"4th of July"	U2	The Unforgettable Fire	1984		
"11 O'Clock Tick Tock" ‡	U2	"11 O'Clock Tick Tock" single	1980		
"13 (There Is a Light)"	U2	Songs of Experience	2017		
"40"	U2	War	1983		
"Acrobat"	U2	Achtung Baby	1991		
"Ahimsa" feat. A. R. Rahman	U2; A. R. Rahman	"Ahimsa" single	2019		(Note: Released in a digital format only)
"Alex Descends Into Hell for a Bottle of Milk / Korova 1"	Bono; The Edge	"The Fly" single	1991		
"All Along the Watchtower"	Bob Dylan	Rattle and Hum	1988		(Note: Released as a live concert recording only) (Note: Bob Dylan cover)
"All Because of You" †	U2	How to Dismantle an Atomic Bomb	2004		
"All I Want Is You" †	U2	Rattle and Hum	1988		
"Always"	U2	"Beautiful Day" single	2000		
"Always Forever Now" as Passengers	U2; Brian Eno	Original Soundtracks 1	1995		
"Amazing Grace" feat. Soweto Gospel Choir	John Newton; William Walker	Duals	2011		
"American Obituary"	U2	Days of Ash	2026		
"American Soul"	U2	Songs of Experience	2017		
"Angel of Harlem" †	U2	Rattle and Hum	1988		
"Angels Too Tied to the Ground"	U2	War (2008 deluxe edition)	2008		
"Another Day" ‡	U2	"Another Day" single	1980		
"Another Time, Another Place"	U2	Boy	1980		
"Are You Gonna Wait Forever?"	U2	"Vertigo" single	2004		
"Atomic City"	U2; Debbie Harry; Giorgio Moroder	"Atomic City" single	2023		
"Babyface"	U2	Zooropa	1993		
"Bad"	U2	The Unforgettable Fire	1984		
"The Ballad of Ronnie Drew" ‡ feat. The Dubliners, Kíla, A Band of Bowsies	U2; The Dubliners; Kíla; Robert Hunter; Simon Carmody	"The Ballad of Ronnie Drew" single	2008		
"Bang a Gong (Get It On)" feat. Elton John	Marc Bolan	AngelHeaded Hipster: The Songs of Marc Bolan & T. Rex	2020		(Note: T. Rex cover)
"Bass Trap"	U2	"The Unforgettable Fire" single	1985		
"Beach Sequence" as Passengers	U2; Brian Eno	Original Soundtracks 1	1995		
"Beat on the Brat"	Joey Ramone; Johnny Ramone; Dee Dee Ramone	We're a Happy Family: A Tribute to Ramones	2003		(Note: Ramones cover)
"Beautiful Day" †	U2	All That You Can't Leave Behind	2000		
"Beautiful Ghost / Introduction to Songs of Experience"	U2; William Blake	Unreleased & Rare	2004		
"Because the Night" feat. Bruce Springsteen, Patti Smith, Roy Bittan	Bruce Springsteen; Patti Smith	The 25th Anniversary Rock & Roll Hall of Fame Concerts	2010		(Note: Patti Smith Group cover)
"Big Girls Are Best"	U2	"Stuck in a Moment You Can't Get Out Of" single	2001		
"The Blackout"	U2	Songs of Experience	2017		
"Blow Your House Down"	U2	Achtung Baby (20th Anniversary deluxe edition)	2011		
"Book of Your Heart"	U2	Songs of Experience (deluxe edition)	2017		
"Boomerang I"	U2	"Pride (In the Name of Love)" single	1984		
"Boomerang II"	U2	"Pride (In the Name of Love)" single	1984		
"Boy/Girl"	U2	Three	1979		
"Breathe"	U2	No Line on the Horizon	2009		
"Bullet the Blue Sky"	U2	The Joshua Tree	1987		
"California (There Is No End to Love)"	U2	Songs of Innocence	2014		
"Can't Help Falling in Love"	George David Weiss; Hugo Peretti; Luigi Creatore	Zoo TV: Live from Sydney	1994		(Note: Elvis Presley cover)
"Cartoon World"	U2	Boy (2008 deluxe edition)	2008		
"An Cat Dubh"	U2	Boy	1980		
"Cedars of Lebanon"	U2; Brian Eno; Daniel Lanois	No Line on the Horizon	2009		(Note: The song features a sample of "Against the Sky" by Harold Budd and Brian Eno from the album The Pearl (1984).)
"Cedarwood Road"	U2	Songs of Innocence	2014		
"A Celebration" ‡	U2	"A Celebration" single	1982		
"Christmas (Baby Please Come Home)"	Ellie Greenwich; Phil Spector	A Very Special Christmas	1987		(Note: Darlene Love cover)
"City of Blinding Lights" †	U2	How to Dismantle an Atomic Bomb	2004		
"Coexist (I Will Bless the Lord at All Times?)"	Brian Eno; U2	Easter Lily	2026		
"Corpse (These Chains Are Way Too Long)" as Passengers	U2; Brian Eno	Original Soundtracks 1	1995		
"Country Mile"	U2	How to Re-Assemble an Atomic Bomb	2024		
"Crumbs from Your Table"	U2	How to Dismantle an Atomic Bomb	2004		
"The Crystal Ballroom"	U2	Songs of Innocence (deluxe edition)	2014		
"Daddy's Gonna Pay for Your Crashed Car"	U2	Zooropa	1993		(Note: The song samples the fanfare from the album Lenin's Favourite Songs, and also contains a sample from the song "The City Sleeps" by MC 900 Ft. Jesus.)
"Dancing Barefoot"	Patti Smith; Ivan Kral	"When Love Comes to Town" single	1989		
"A Day Without Me" †	U2	Boy	1980		
"Deep in the Heart"	U2	"I Still Haven't Found What I'm Looking For" single	1987		
"Desert of Our Love"	U2	The Joshua Tree (20th Anniversary deluxe edition)	2007		
"Desire" †	U2	Rattle and Hum	1988		
"A Different Kind of Blue" as Passengers	U2; Brian Eno	Original Soundtracks 1	1995		
"Dirty Day"	U2	Zooropa	1993		
"Disappearing Act"	U2	The Unforgettable Fire (2009 deluxe edition)	2009		
"Discothèque" †	U2	Pop	1997		(Note: The song contains a sample from "Fame" performed by Freeform and written by Simon Pyke.)
"Do You Feel Loved"	U2	Pop	1997		
"Don't Take Your Guns to Town"	Johnny Cash	"Elevation" single	2001		(Note: Johnny Cash cover)
"Down All the Days"	U2	Achtung Baby (20th Anniversary "Super Deluxe" and "Uber Deluxe" editions)	2011		
"Drowning Man"	U2	War	1983		
"Drunk Chicken / America" feat. Allen Ginsberg	U2; Allen Ginsberg	The Joshua Tree (20th Anniversary deluxe edition)	2007		
"Easter Parade"	U2	Easter Lily	2026		
"The Electric Co."	U2	Boy	1980		
"Electrical Storm" †	U2	The Best of 1990–2000	2002		
"Elevation" †	U2	All That You Can't Leave Behind	2000		
"Elvis Ate America" as Passengers; feat. Howie B	U2; Brian Eno; Howie B	Original Soundtracks 1	1995		
"Elvis Presley and America"	U2	The Unforgettable Fire	1984		
"Endless Deep"	U2	"Sunday Bloody Sunday" and "Two Hearts Beat as One" singles	1983		
"Even Better Than the Real Thing" †	U2	Achtung Baby	1991		
"Everlasting Love"	Mac Gayden; Buzz Cason	"All I Want Is You" single	1988		(Note: Robert Knight cover)
"Every Breaking Wave" †	U2	Songs of Innocence	2014		
"Everybody Loves a Winner" feat. Maria McKee	William Bell; Booker T. Jones	Achtung Baby (20th Anniversary "Super Deluxe" and "Uber Deluxe" editions)	2011		(Note: William Bell cover)
"Exit"	U2	The Joshua Tree	1987		
"Evidence of Life"	The Edge; Bono	How to Re-Assemble an Atomic Bomb	2024		
"Fast Cars"	U2	How to Dismantle an Atomic Bomb (UK and Japan release)	2004		
"Fez – Being Born"	U2; Brian Eno; Daniel Lanois	No Line on the Horizon	2009		
"Fire" †	U2	October	1981		
"Fireflies"	Martijn Garritsen; Paul Hewson; David Evans; Simon Carmody	"Fireflies" single	2026		
"The First Time"	U2	Zooropa	1993		
"Flower Child"	U2	Unreleased & Rare	2004		
"The Fly" †	U2	Achtung Baby	1991		
"The Fool"	U2	Early Demos	2004		
"Fortunate Son"	John Fogerty	"Who's Gonna Ride Your Wild Horses" single	1991		(Note: Creedence Clearwater Revival cover)
"Get On Your Boots" †	U2	No Line on the Horizon	2009		
"Get Out of Your Own Way" †	U2	Songs of Experience	2017		
"Gimme Shelter" feat. Mick Jagger, Fergie, will.i.am	Mick Jagger; Keith Richards	The 25th Anniversary Rock & Roll Hall of Fame Concerts	2010		(Note: The Rolling Stones cover)
"Gloria" †	U2	October	1981		
"God Part II"	U2	Rattle and Hum	1988		
"Gone"	U2	Pop	1997		
"Grace"	U2	All That You Can't Leave Behind	2000		
"The Ground Beneath Her Feet" feat. Daniel Lanois	U2; Salman Rushdie	The Million Dollar Hotel soundtrack	2000		
"Hallelujah Here She Comes"	U2	"Desire" single	1988		
"The Hands That Built America"	U2	The Best of 1990–2000	2002		
"Happiness"	U2	How to Re-Assemble an Atomic Bomb	2024		
"Happiness Is a Warm Gun"	John Lennon; Paul McCartney	"Last Night on Earth" single	1997		(Note: The Beatles cover)
"Hawkmoon 269"	U2	Rattle and Hum	1988		
"Heartland"	U2	Rattle and Hum	1988		
"Heaven and Hell"	U2	Achtung Baby (20th Anniversary "Super Deluxe" and "Uber Deluxe" editions)	2011		
"Help!"	John Lennon; Paul McCartney	¡Released! The Human Rights Concerts – 1986: A Conspiracy of Hope	2014		
"Helter Skelter"	John Lennon; Paul McCartney	Rattle and Hum	1988		
"Hold Me, Thrill Me, Kiss Me, Kill Me" †	U2	Batman Forever soundtrack	1995		
"Holy Joe"	U2	"Discothèque" single	1997		
"I Believe in Father Christmas"	Greg Lake; Peter Sinfield	(RED)Wire Vol. 1 Issue 2	2008		(Note: Greg Lake cover)
"I Don't Wanna See You Smile"	U2; Simon Carmody	Unreleased & Rare	2004		(Note: Originally released as "Smile"; re-titled on How to Re-Assemble an Atomic Bomb (2024))
"I Fall Down"	U2	October	1981		
"I Remember You"	Joey Ramone; Johnny Ramone; Dee Dee Ramone; Tommy Ramone	"Elevation" single	2001		
"I Still Haven't Found What I'm Looking For" †	U2	The Joshua Tree	1987		
"I Threw a Brick Through a Window"	U2	October	1981		
"I Will Follow" †	U2	Boy	1980		
"I'll Go Crazy If I Don't Go Crazy Tonight" †	U2	No Line on the Horizon	2009		
"I'm Not Your Baby" feat. Sinéad O'Connor	U2	The End of Violence soundtrack	1997		
"If God Will Send His Angels" †	U2	Pop	1997		
"If You Wear That Velvet Dress"	U2	Pop	1997		
"In God's Country" †	U2	The Joshua Tree	1987		
"In a Life"	U2	Easter Lily	2026		
"In a Little While"	U2	All That You Can't Leave Behind	2000		
"Indian Summer Sky"	U2	The Unforgettable Fire	1984		
"Instant Karma!"	John Lennon	Instant Karma: The Amnesty International Campaign to Save Darfur	2007		(Note: John Lennon/Yoko Ono cover)
"Into the Heart"	U2	Boy	1980		
"Invisible" ‡	U2	"Invisible" single	2014		
"Iris (Hold Me Close)"	U2	Songs of Innocence	2014		
"Is That All?"	U2	October	1981		
"Ito Okashi" as Passengers; feat. Holi	U2; Brian Eno; Holi	Original Soundtracks 1	1995		
"J. Swallo"	U2	"Fire" single	1981		
"Jesus Christ"	Woody Guthrie	Folkways: A Vision Shared	1988		(Note: Woody Guthrie cover)
"Kite"	U2	All That You Can't Leave Behind	2000		
"Lady with the Spinning Head (UV1)"	U2	"One" single	1991		
"Landlady"	U2	Songs of Experience	2017		
"Last Night on Earth" †	U2	Pop	1997		(Note: The song contains excerpts from "Trayra Boia" written by Naná Vasconcelos and Denise Milan.)
"Lemon" †	U2	Zooropa	1993		
"Levitate"	U2	Unreleased & Rare	2004		
"Lights of Home"	U2; Alana Haim; Danielle Haim; Este Haim; Ariel Rechtshaid	Songs of Experience	2017		
"Like a Song..."	U2	War	1983		
"The Little Things That Give You Away"	U2	Songs of Experience	2017		
"Love and Peace or Else"	U2	How to Dismantle an Atomic Bomb	2004		
"Love Comes Tumbling"	U2	"The Unforgettable Fire" single	1985		
"Love Is All We Have Left"	U2	Songs of Experience	2017		
"Love Is Bigger Than Anything in Its Way" †	U2	Songs of Experience	2017		
"Love Is Blindness"	U2	Achtung Baby	1991		
"Love Rescue Me" feat. Bob Dylan	U2; Bob Dylan	Rattle and Hum	1988		
"Love You Like Mad"	U2	Unreleased & Rare	2004		
"Lucifer's Hands"	U2	Songs of Innocence (deluxe edition)	2014		
"Luckiest Man in the World"	U2	How to Re-Assemble an Atomic Bomb	2024		
"Luminous Times (Hold on to Love)"	U2; Brian Eno	"With or Without You" single	1987		
"MLK"	U2	The Unforgettable Fire	1984		
"Maggie's Farm"	Bob Dylan	Live for Ireland	1986		
"Magnificent" †	U2; Brian Eno; Daniel Lanois	No Line on the Horizon	2009		
"A Man and a Woman"	U2	How to Dismantle an Atomic Bomb	2004		
"Mercy"	U2	Wide Awake in Europe	2010		
"Miami"	U2	Pop	1997		
"Miracle Drug"	U2	How to Dismantle an Atomic Bomb	2004		
"The Miracle (Of Joey Ramone)" †	U2	Songs of Innocence	2014		
"Miss Sarajevo" † as Passengers; feat. Luciano Pavarotti	U2; Brian Eno	Original Soundtracks 1	1995		
"Mofo" †	U2	Pop	1997		
"Moment of Surrender"	U2; Brian Eno; Daniel Lanois	No Line on the Horizon	2009		
"Mother and Child Reunion"	Paul Simon	Innocence + Experience: Live in Paris	2016		(Note: Paul Simon cover)
"Mothers of the Disappeared"	U2	The Joshua Tree	1987		
"Mysterious Ways" †	U2	Achtung Baby	1991		
"Native Son"	U2	Unreleased & Rare	2004		
"Near the Island"	U2	Achtung Baby (20th Anniversary "Super Deluxe" and "Uber Deluxe" editions)	2011		
"Neon Lights"	Karl Bartos; Ralf Hütter; Florian Schneider	"Vertigo" single	2004		(Note: Kraftwerk cover)
"New Year's Day" †	U2	War	1983		
"New York"	U2	All That You Can't Leave Behind	2000		
"Night and Day"	Cole Porter	Red Hot + Blue	1990		(Note: Cole Porter cover)
"No Line on the Horizon"	U2	No Line on the Horizon	2009		
"North and South of the River"	U2; Christy Moore	"Staring at the Sun" single	1997		
"North Star"	U2	Transformers: Dark of the Moon soundtrack (Note: Featured in the film, but has not been separately released)	2011		
"Numb" †	U2	Zooropa	1993		
"The Ocean"	U2	Boy	1980		
"October"	U2	October	1981		
"Oh Berlin"	U2	Achtung Baby (20th Anniversary "Super Deluxe" and "Uber Deluxe" editions)	2011		
"One" †	U2	Achtung Baby	1991		(Note: Re-recorded with Mary J. Blige for The Breakthrough (2006) and released as a commercial single)
"One Life at a Time"	U2	Days of Ash	2026		
"One Minute Warning" as Passengers	U2; Brian Eno	Original Soundtracks 1	1995		
"One Step Closer"	U2	How to Dismantle an Atomic Bomb	2004		
"One Tree Hill" †	U2	The Joshua Tree	1987		
"Ordinary Love" †	U2; Brian Burton	Mandela: Long Walk to Freedom soundtrack	2013		
"Original of the Species"	U2	How to Dismantle an Atomic Bomb	2004		
"Out of Control" †	U2	Three	1979		(Note: Re-recorded for Boy (1980))
"Paint It Black"	Mick Jagger; Keith Richards	"Who's Gonna Ride Your Wild Horses" single	1991		
"Peace on Earth"	U2	All That You Can't Leave Behind	2000		
"People Have the Power" feat. Eagles of Death Metal	Patti Smith; Frederick Smith	Innocence + Experience: Live in Paris	2016		(Note: Patti Smith cover)
"Picture of You (X+W)"	U2	How to Re-Assemble an Atomic Bomb	2024		
"The Playboy Mansion"	U2	Pop	1997		(Note: The song contains excerpts of "You Showed Me" written by Gene Clark and Roger McGuinn.)
"Please" †	U2	Pop	1997		
"Plot 180" as Passengers	U2; Brian Eno	Original Soundtracks 1	1995		
"Pop Muzik"	Robin Scott	"Last Night on Earth" single	1997		(Note: M cover)
"Pride (In the Name of Love)" †	U2	The Unforgettable Fire	1984		
"Promenade"	U2	The Unforgettable Fire	1984		
"Race Against Time"	U2	"Where the Streets Have No Name" single	1987		
"Raised by Wolves"	U2	Songs of Innocence	2014		
"Red Flag Day"	U2	Songs of Experience	2017		
"Red Hill Mining Town"	U2	The Joshua Tree	1987		
"Red Light"	U2	War	1983		
"The Refugee"	U2	War	1983		
"Rejoice"	U2	October	1981		
"Resurrection Song"	U2	Easter Lily	2026		
"Rise Up"	U2	The Joshua Tree (20th Anniversary deluxe edition)	2007		
"A Room at the Heartbreak Hotel"	U2	"Angel of Harlem" single	1988		
"Running to Stand Still"	U2	The Joshua Tree	1987		
"The Saints Are Coming" † feat. Green Day	Richard Jobson; Stuart Adamson	U218 Singles	2006		(Note: The Skids cover)
"Salomé"	U2	"Even Better Than the Real Thing" single	1991		
"Satellite of Love"	Lou Reed	"One" single	1991		(Note: Lou Reed cover)
"Saturday Night"	U2	Boy (2008 deluxe edition)	2008		
"Scarlet"	U2	October	1981		
"Sgt. Pepper's Lonely Hearts Club Band" ‡ feat. Paul McCartney	John Lennon; Paul McCartney	"Sgt. Pepper's Lonely Hearts Club Band" single	2005		
"Scars"	U2; Martin Garrix; John Martin; Michel Zitron; Simon Carmody	Easter Lily	2026		
"Seconds"	U2	War	1983		
"Shadows and Tall Trees"	U2	Boy	1980		
"She's a Mystery to Me"	Bono; The Edge	"All Because of You" single	2005		(Note: Roy Orbison cover)
"The Showman (Little More Better)"	U2	Songs of Experience	2017		
"Silver and Gold"	Bono	"Where the Streets Have No Name" single	1987		
"Sixty Seconds in Kingdom Come"	U2	"The Unforgettable Fire" single	1985		
"Sleep Like a Baby Tonight"	U2	Songs of Innocence	2014		
"Slow Dancing"	U2	"Stay (Faraway, So Close!)" single	1993		(Note: Re-recorded feat. Willie Nelson for the "If God Will Send His Angels" single (1997))
"Slug" as Passengers	U2; Brian Eno	Original Soundtracks 1	1995		
"So Cruel"	U2	Achtung Baby	1991		
"Some Days Are Better Than Others"	U2	Zooropa	1993		
"Sometimes You Can't Make It on Your Own" †	U2	How to Dismantle an Atomic Bomb	2004		
"Song for Hal"	U2	Easter Lily	2026		
"Song for Someone" †	U2	Songs of Innocence	2014		
"Song of the Future"	U2	Days of Ash	2026		
"A Sort of Homecoming"	U2	The Unforgettable Fire	1984		
"Soon"	U2; Brian Eno; Daniel Lanois	"Soon" single (Note: Single released exclusive as part of the U2360° at the Rose Bowl super deluxe box set)	2010		
"Spanish Eyes"	U2	"I Still Haven't Found What I'm Looking For" single	1987		
"Speed of Life"	U2	Boy (2008 deluxe edition)	2008		
"Springhill Mining Disaster"	Peggy Seeger	The Late Late Show Tribute to The Dubliners	2008		(Note: Peggy Seeger cover)
"Stand Up Comedy"	U2	No Line on the Horizon	2009		
"Staring at the Sun" †	U2	Pop	1997		
"Stateless"	U2	The Million Dollar Hotel soundtrack	2000		
"Stay (Faraway, So Close!)" †	U2	Zooropa	1993		
"Stories for Boys"	U2	Three	1979		
"Stranger in a Strange Land"	U2	October	1981		
"Street Mission"	U2	Early Demos	2004		
"Street of Dreams"	U2	"Street of Dreams" single	2026		
"Stuck in a Moment You Can't Get Out Of" †	U2	All That You Can't Leave Behind	2000		
"Summer of Love"	U2	Songs of Experience	2017		
"Summer Rain"	U2	"Beautiful Day" single	2000		
"Sun City" feat. Little Steven, Lou Reed, Rubén Blades, Nona Hendryx	Little Steven	¡Released! The Human Rights Concerts – 1986: A Conspiracy of Hope	2014		(Note: Artists United Against Apartheid cover)
"Sunday Bloody Sunday" †	U2	War	1983		
"Surrender"	U2	War	1983		
"Sweet Fire of Love" Robbie Robertson feat. U2	Robbie Robertson; U2	Robbie Robertson	1987		
"Sweetest Thing"	U2	"Where the Streets Have No Name" single	1987		(Note: Re-recorded as "Sweetest Thing" (The Single Mix) for The Best of 1980–1990 (1998) and released as a commercial single)
"The Tears of Things"	U2	Days of Ash	2026		
"Testimony" Robbie Robertson feat. U2	Robbie Robertson	Robbie Robertson	1987		
"Theme from Let's Go Native" as Passengers	U2; Brian Eno	Original Soundtracks 1	1995		
"Theme from The Batman"	The Edge	How to Re-Assemble an Atomic Bomb	2024		
"Theme from The Swan" as Passengers	U2; Brian Eno	Original Soundtracks 1	1995		
"Things to Make and Do"	U2	"A Day Without Me" single	1980		
"This Is Where You Can Reach Me Now"	U2	Songs of Innocence	2014		
"The Three Sunrises"	U2	"The Unforgettable Fire" single	1985		
"Tomorrow"	U2	October	1981		
"Touch"	U2	"11 O'Clock Tick Tock" single	1980		
"Tower of Song" feat. Leonard Cohen	Leonard Cohen	Leonard Cohen: I'm Your Man soundtrack	2006		(Note: Leonard Cohen cover)
"Trash, Trampoline, and the Party Girl"	U2	"A Celebration" single	1982		(Note: Also released as "Party Girl")
"Treasure (Whatever Happened to Pete the Chop)"	U2	"New Year's Day" single	1983		
"Treason"	U2; Dave Stewart	How to Re-Assemble an Atomic Bomb	2024		
"Trip Through Your Wires"	U2	The Joshua Tree	1987		
"The Troubles"	U2	Songs of Innocence	2014		
"Tryin' to Throw Your Arms Around the World"	U2	Achtung Baby	1991		
"Twilight"	U2	"Another Day" single	1980		
"Two Hearts Beat as One" †	U2	War	1983		
"Two Shots of Happy, One Shot of Sad"	Bono; The Edge	"If God Will Send His Angels" single	1997		
"Ultraviolet (Light My Way)"	U2	Achtung Baby	1991		
"Unchained Melody"	Alex North; Hy Zaret	"All I Want Is You" single	1988		(Note: Todd Duncan cover)
"The Unforgettable Fire" †	U2	The Unforgettable Fire	1984		
"United Colours" as Passengers	U2; Brian Eno	Original Soundtracks 1	1995		
"Unknown Caller"	U2; Brian Eno; Daniel Lanois	No Line on the Horizon	2009		
"Until the End of the World"	U2	Achtung Baby	1991		
"Van Diemen's Land"	U2	Rattle and Hum	1988		
"Vertigo" †	U2	How to Dismantle an Atomic Bomb	2004		
"Viva Davidoff" as Passengers	U2; Brian Eno	"Miss Sarajevo" single	1995		
"Volcano"	U2	Songs of Innocence	2014		
"Wake Up Dead Man"	U2	Pop	1997		(Note: The song contains excerpts of "Besrodna Nevesta" written by Nikolai Iankov Kaoufmane.)
"Walk On" †	U2	All That You Can't Leave Behind	2000		
"Walk to the Water"	U2	"With or Without You" single	1987		
"The Wanderer" feat. Johnny Cash	U2	Zooropa	1993		
"Wave of Sorrow (Birdland)"	U2	The Joshua Tree (20th Anniversary deluxe edition)	2007		
"What's Going On"	Al Cleveland; Renaldo Benson; Marvin Gaye	Spotify Singles	2017		(Note: Marvin Gaye cover)
"When I Look at the World"	U2	All That You Can't Leave Behind	2000		
"When Love Comes to Town" † feat. B.B. King	U2	Rattle and Hum	1988		
"Where Did It All Go Wrong?"	U2	"Even Better Than the Real Thing" single	1991		
"Where the Streets Have No Name" †	U2	The Joshua Tree	1987		
"Where Is the Love?" feat. The Black Eyed Peas	William Adams; Justin Timberlake; Jaime Gomez; Allan Pineda; Printz Board; Michael Fratantuno; George Pajon; J. Curtis	The 25th Anniversary Rock & Roll Hall of Fame Concerts	2010		(Note: The Black Eyed Peas cover)
"White as Snow"	Traditional; arr.: U2; Brian Eno; Daniel Lanois	No Line on the Horizon	2009		
"Who's Gonna Ride Your Wild Horses" †	U2	Achtung Baby	1991		
"Wild Honey"	U2	All That You Can't Leave Behind	2000		
"Wildpeace"	U2; Jacknife Lee; Yehuda Amichai	Days of Ash	2026		
"Window in the Skies" †	U2	U218 Singles	2006		
"Winter"	U2	Linear soundtrack	2009		
"Wire"	U2	The Unforgettable Fire	1984		
"With a Shout (Jerusalem)"	U2	October	1981		
"With or Without You" †	U2	The Joshua Tree	1987		
"Xanax and Wine"	U2	Unreleased & Rare	2004		
"XXX" Kendrick Lamar feat. U2	Kendrick Duckworth; Michael Williams II; Dacoury Natche; Mark Spears; Anthony Tiffith; U2	Damn	2017		
"Yahweh"	U2	How to Dismantle an Atomic Bomb	2004		
"Yoshino Blossom"	U2	The Unforgettable Fire (2009 deluxe edition)	2009		
"You're the Best Thing About Me" †	U2	Songs of Experience	2017		
"Your Blue Room" as Passengers	U2; Brian Eno	Original Soundtracks 1	1995		
"Your Song Saved My Life" †	U2	Sing 2 soundtrack	2021		
"Yours Eternally"	U2; Ed Sheeran; Simon Carmody	Days of Ash	2026		
"Zoo Station"	U2	Achtung Baby	1991		
"Zooropa"	U2	Zooropa	1993		
