= Folkways =

Folkways can refer to:

- Folkways or mores, in sociology, are norms for routine or casual interaction
- Folkways Records, a record label founded by Moe Asch of the Smithsonian Institution in 1948
  - Verve Folkways, an offshoot of Folkways Records formed in 1964
  - Smithsonian Folkways, the record label of the Smithsonian Institution, which incorporated Folkways Records in 1987
    - Folkways: The Original Vision, a 1989 album produced by Smithsonian Folkways documenting the origins of Folkways Records
    - Folkways: The Original Vision (Woody and LeadBelly), a 2005 expanded version of the 1989 album
- Folkways: a study of the sociological importance of usages, manners, customs, mores, and morals, a 1906 book by William Graham Sumner
- Folkways: A Vision Shared, a 1988 album produced by CBS paying tribute to American musicians Woody Guthrie and Lead Belly
