= Michael Hamlyn =

British film, music video and theatre producer

- Born: Michael Paul Frederic Hamlyn; March 23, 1955 (age 70); Paddington, London, UK
- Occupation: Producer
- Notable work: The Adventures of Priscilla, Queen of the Desert, U2: Rattle and Hum

Michael Paul Frederick Hamlyn (born 23 March 1955) is an English film and theatre producer. He is best known for producing the award-winning film and stage production The Adventures of Priscilla, Queen of the Desert and a documentary U2: Rattle and Hum. In 1991 he established Specific Films Ltd.

== Career ==
Hamlyn has produced feature films, theatrical work and music videos for artists and bands including U2, The Rolling Stones, Bruce Springsteen and INXS. His productions have received multiple awards including an Academy Award and a Grammy. Hamlyn has also held the position of the governor of London's Southbank Centre.

=== Films ===
- The Secret Policeman's Other Ball (1982)
- Party Party (film) (1983)
- White City (1985)
- U2: Rattle and Hum (1988)
- The Adventures of Priscilla, Queen of the Desert (1994)
- Mr. Reliable (1996)
- Paws (film) (1997)
- The Proposition (2005 film) (2005)
- Killer Weekend
- Mystify: Michael Hutchence (2019)

=== Theatre ===
- Priscilla, Queen of the Desert (musical) (2006 - present)

=== Music Videos ===
- Predictable (The Kinks song), The Kinks (1981)
- Come Dancing (song), The Kinks (1983)
- Don't Forget to Dance, The Kinks (1983)
- Pride (In the Name of Love), U2 (1984)
- With or Without You, U2 (1987)
- Need You Tonight, INXS (1987)
- Where the Streets Have No Name, U2 (1987)
- Risky, Ryuichi Sakamoto ft. Iggy Pop (1987)
- Desire (U2 song), U2 (1988)
- Angel of Harlem, U2 (1988)

== Other work ==
Hamlyn is the son of the late Lord Paul Hamlyn, and has been a trustee of the Paul Hamlyn Foundation since the 80s. He is also a co-owner of Bibendum, a restaurant located in the Michelin Building in London, in partnership with the late Sir Terence Conran.
