= Point Theatre =

Venue in Dublin, Ireland

- Point Depot; The Point
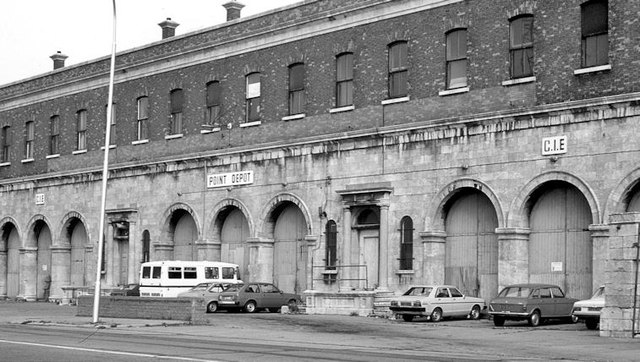
- The Point Depot in 1983
- Interactive map of Point Theatre
- Address: East Point Office Park; Dublin, Leinster; Ireland
- Location: Point Village
- Coordinates: 53.3475°N 6.2284°W
- Capacity: 6,300 seated; 8,500 with standing

Construction
- Opened: November 1988
- Closed: 25 August 2007
- Demolished: Late 2007
- Years active: 1988–2007

The Point Theatre (sometimes referred to as the Point Depot or simply as the Point) was a concert and events venue in Dublin, Ireland, that operated from 1988 to 2007, visited by in excess of 2 million people. It was located on the North Wall Quay of the River Liffey, amongst the Dublin Docklands. During its lifespan, the venue had a seated capacity of 6,300 or 8,500 standing.

The Point was noted for its flexible seating configurations; over the years it served not only as a music venue, but had also been turned into an ice rink, a boxing arena, a conference hall, an exhibition centre, a wrestling ring, a theatre, an opera house and a three ring circus. It hosted the Eurovision Song Contest in 1994, 1995 and 1997 (the only venue to hold the event three times) and the 1999 MTV Europe Music Awards.

In May 1996, 17-year-old Bernadette O’Brien was caught in a crowd crush during a Smashing Pumpkins concert at the venue, and suffered injuries which ultimately led to her death.

The Point was closed in the middle of 2007 for a major redevelopment and was succeeded by The O2 Arena in July 2008. it was renamed in September 2014 as the 3Arena.

== History ==
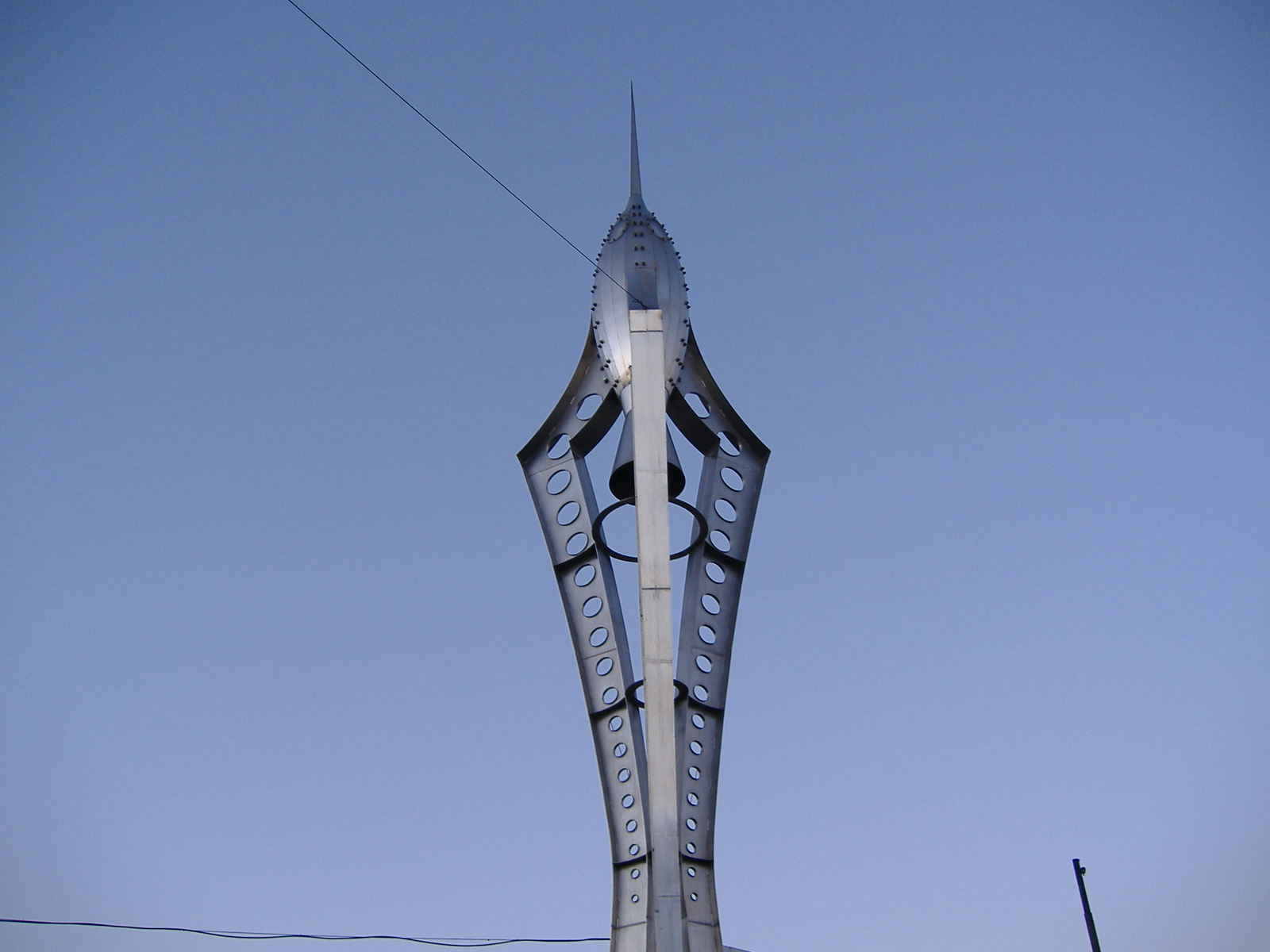
The rocket, located just outside the venue itself.

The building was constructed in 1878 as a train depot to serve the nearby busy port. Among railwaymen it was always known as "The Point Store". In the late 1980s, after many years of neglect and disuse, it was bought by local developer, Harry Crosbie along with Apollo Leisure (now Live Nation) fitted out the venue with balconies, offices and backstage facilities. Before it was renovated, U2 recorded the second track of their 1988 album, Rattle and Hum, "Van Diemen's Land" there, and footage of performances of this song and "Desire" from the building appear in the accompanying Rattle and Hum movie.

The Point opened in 1988. Melissa Etheridge being the support act for Huey Lewis and the News was the first to play there. U2 played four nights at the venue near the end of their Lovetown Tour from 26 to 31 December 1989. Their 31 December concert was broadcast live on radio stations around the world and would later receive an official online release via iTunes.

In the 1990s, the Point was seen by millions of European television viewers, as it was the venue for the Eurovision Song Contest on three separate occasions over four years, in 1994, 1995, and 1997, becoming the only venue to have hosted the final three times. Riverdance was first performed in the Point Depot, as the interval act during the Eurovision Song Contest 1994. It also hosted the Irish Eurovision national final, Eurosong, in 1993 and 1996.

=== Death of Bernadette O'Brien ===
On 11 May 1996, Bernadette O’Brien, a 17-year-old from Shanagarry, County Cork, was fatally injured during a Smashing Pumpkins concert at the Point Theatre. The venue was filled with approximately 8,500 fans when a surge at the front of the crowd led to panic, trampling, and serious injuries. O’Brien, who had travelled to Dublin with a friend and was staying with family in Rathmines, was pulled from the crush by security, treated by on-site medical personnel, and transported to the Mater Hospital in critical condition. She died the following afternoon after life support was withdrawn.

Multiple witnesses later described chaotic scenes of overcrowding near the stage, with people collapsing and being trampled. Some, like Robert Acton (17), lost consciousness due to the pressure and were rescued by fellow attendees. Acton later suffered crushed ribs and post-traumatic stress. Another attendee, Michael Nesdale (23), said the crowd was so tightly packed that movement was impossible, and he saw a "black hole" of fallen people. He attempted to lift others to safety and commended the band for stopping the show and appealing for calm.

The Smashing Pumpkins halted their performance twice. Vocalist Billy Corgan told the crowd, "There are people getting hurt down here", while bassist D'arcy Wretzky addressed the situation more bluntly, stating, "There's a girl dying backstage. Do you care?" The concert was ultimately abandoned, and the band cancelled a scheduled show in Belfast the following night. According to their record label, Virgin, the group was "devastated" by the incident.

Promoters MCD and the Point Exhibition Company issued a joint statement expressing condolences and announced a full inquiry. They stated that the event complied with safety regulations, with 110 security personnel and medical staff on site. The venue’s capacity had not been exceeded, and similar events had taken place without incident. Nonetheless, Gardaí investigated the decision to keep the venue’s bars open during a youth-heavy concert. At a subsequent inquest, testimony indicated widespread distress and a lack of crowd control at the front of the venue.

=== 1999 to 2007 ===
The 1999 MTV Europe Music Awards were held in the Point Depot on 11 November. Hosted by Ronan Keating, there were performances from Mariah Carey, The Corrs, Whitney Houston, Iggy Pop, Marilyn Manson and Britney Spears on the night. Award presenters included Alicia Silverstone, Mick Jagger, Pierce Brosnan, Carmen Electra, LL Cool J, Mary J. Blige, Iggy Pop, Fun Lovin' Criminals, Des'ree, Five, Christina Aguilera, Damon Albarn, Geri Halliwell and Gary Barlow. The largest winner was Britney Spears who won four awards (Best Female, Best Pop, Best Breakthrough Artist, and Best Song for "...Baby One More Time"). Boyzone won two awards (Best UK & Ireland Act and Best Album for By Request).

The final event to take place before closure and rebranding was a boxing card featuring local boxer, Bernard Dunne on 25 August 2007. Promoter Brian Peters had moved his European title defence against Kiko Martinez from Dublin's boxing-specific National Stadium across the Liffey to the Point Depot where Dunne shattered former heavyweight champion Lennox Lewis's previous attendance record for the venue.

== Notable events ==
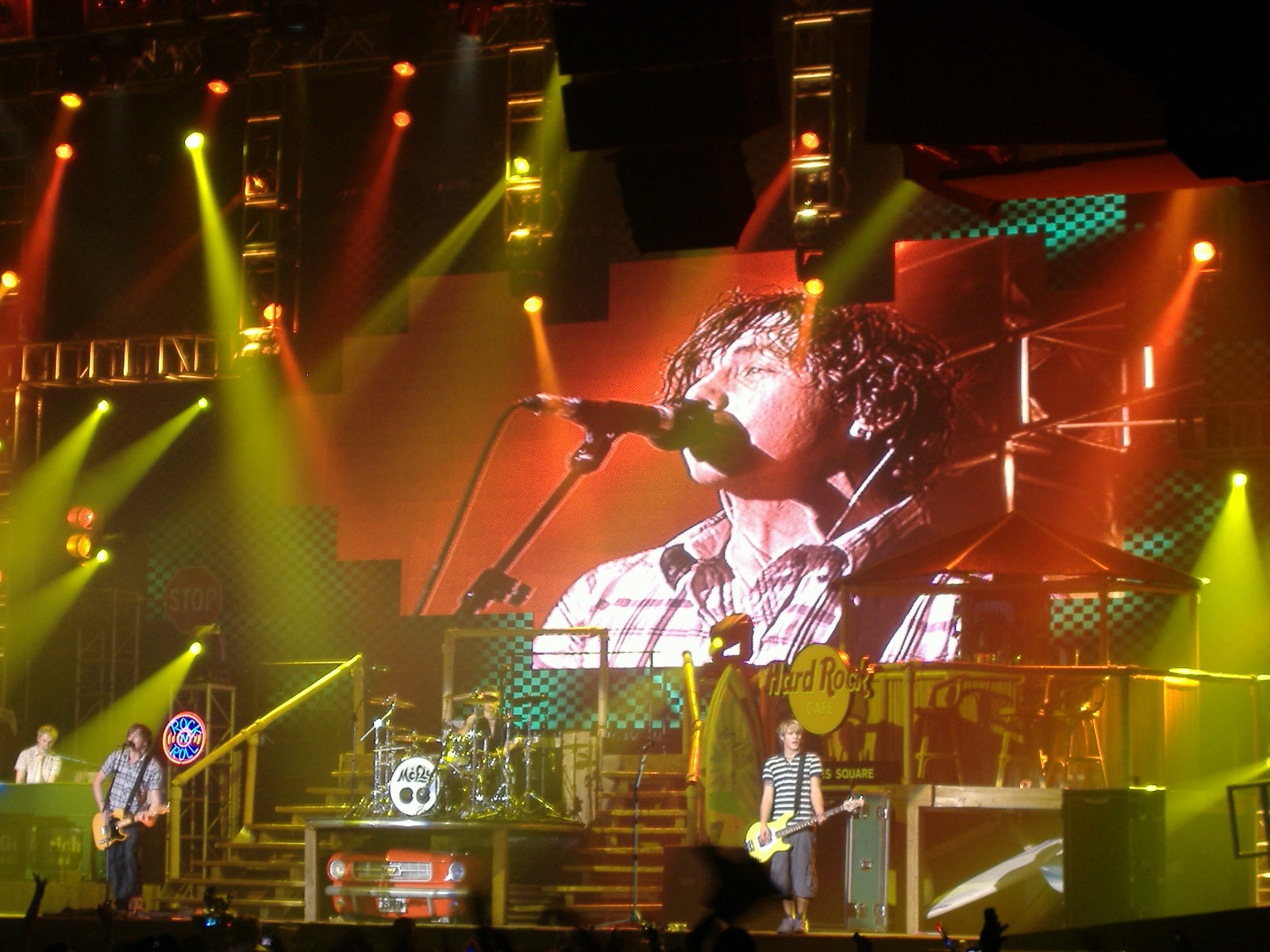
McFly performed at the Point in 2006.

U2 performed four shows at the venue during the Lovetown Tour on 26, 27, 30, and 31 December 1989, with B.B. King as the opening act. The 30 December show is where Bono made his famous “Dream it all up again” speech that foreshadowed the drastic change of style for their next album, Achtung Baby.

Frank Sinatra took the stage on 9, 10 and 11 October 1991, and shortly afterwards, in November 1991, Kylie Minogue brought her Let's Get to It Tour European tour to the venue; a concert later filmed for VHS release.

In April 1992, Neville Marriner conducted a performance of Handel’s Messiah to mark its 250th anniversary, featuring Sylvia McNair, Anne Sofie von Otter, Michael Chance, Jerry Hadley and Robert Lloyd, with the Academy and Chorus of St Martin in the Fields. That same year, on 19 June 1992, Def Leppard began their Seven Day Weekend Tour of Europe at the Point Depot; it was the first time they’d taken their “in the round” stage show outside North America, complete with a revolving drum kit and movable lighting rig. Two days later, on 21 June 1992, Nirvana launched their summer European tour in support of Nevermind before a sell-out crowd. On 30 November 1992, Faith No More returned to the venue with L7 as support.

The Point introduced Riverdance to the world at the 1994 Eurovision Song Contest.

On 27 June 1996, Michael Flatley’s ‘‘Lord of the Dance’’ premiered at The Point Theatre. A year later, Oasis played three sold-out shows on 3, 4 and 5 December 1997 as part of their Be Here Now Tour—with Noel Gallagher stepping in on lead vocals on the 4th and 5th. In February 1998, the Spice Girls performed two shows on 24 and 25 February during their Spiceworld Tour.

Neil Diamond returned in February 1999 for six shows, and later that year the venue hosted the MTV Europe Music Awards with Ronan Keating presenting.

Irish band Westlife set a venue record with 13 consecutive nights from 19 to 31 March 2001 on their Where Dreams Come True Tour, then came back for six shows between 6–8, 10–12 and 14–18 June 2002 on their World of Our Own Tour.

On 21 June 2002, Destiny's Child made their debut performance in the country with a sold-out show as part of the Destiny's Child World Tour.

In 2003, rapper Akon headlined the SCREAM Event before over 8,000 fans, backed by M.V.P and DJ Rankin. That year 50 Cent’s Point show appears briefly on the special-features of his film ‘‘Get Rich or Die Tryin'’’, while The Rolling Stones played two September shows as part of their European Tour.

On 8 May 2004, Cher kicked off the European leg of her Living Proof: The Farewell Tour. That spring, Westlife returned for their Turnaround Tour on 11–13, 15–16 and 18–21 May. In late 2004, Pink launched her Try This Tour at the Point. On 16 December 2004, Blink-182 staged their last show before a four-year hiatus, and Irish folk-rockers Planxty played reunion concerts on 28, 29 and 30 December 2004 and again on 3, 4 and 5 January 2005.

In early 2005, Westlife toured on The No 1's Tour (8–9, 11–13 and 15–16 February, plus 11 and 14 May). That May, Kylie Minogue returned after a 14-year absence with her Showgirl Tour, playing six nights just weeks before her breast-cancer diagnosis. On 20 August 2005, Gary Moore honoured Phil Lynott with “The Boy Is Back in Town” concert, later released on DVD and Blu-ray.

The year 2006 saw Celtic Woman debut their Irish concert in February, followed by Westlife’s Face to Face Tour on 11–12, 15–16 and 18–19 April. On 23 August 2006, Pearl Jam opened their first European tour in six years at the Point, and that year also featured performances by Jay-Z and Tool who were on their 10,000 Days tour with Mastodon.

Finally, Westlife concluded a run of 73 shows during The Love Tour from 19–21, 23–24, 26–28 April and 2–3 May 2007.

== Live recordings ==
The Theatre has been the venue for numerous live recordings subsequently released as live albums. David Gray's live performance video, David Gray: Live, released on 19 March 2001, was recorded at a sell-out show at the Point at the end of an Irish tour in December 1999. David Bowie filmed his A Reality Tour DVD in the Point during two sell-out shows there on 22–24 November 2003. R.E.M. filmed and recorded their live double CD/DVD set, R.E.M. Live in the Point on 26–27 February 2005. Bruce Springsteen recorded his 2007 album, Live in Dublin at the Point from 17 to 19 November 2006. Bell X1's live album Tour De Flock was recorded at their sell-out 1 December 2006 performance at the Point. The Venue is featured in The Corrs Documentary All The Way Home, which sees the band during sound check while on their Borrowed Heaven Tour.

== Sports events ==
The Point has hosted many boxing fights featuring local fighter Bernard Dunne most notably his fight for the EBU Super-Bantamweight title against Kiko Martinez. Other boxing events at the venue have been headlined by world champions Lennox Lewis, Naseem Hamed, Steve Collins and Wayne McCullough.

The Point has hosted a number of WWE Smackdown & Raw live events. It also hosted a WCW live event in 1993, which featured the only time a major wrestling World Title changed hands in Ireland, when Big Van Vader defeated Sting for the WCW World Heavyweight Championship.

== Criticism ==
The Point was often criticised for its poor quality of sound control and sightlines. There were also notably lengthy queues for the building's bars and restrooms, particularly for female attendees.

| Preceded by Oslo Spektrum; Oslo | Eurovision Song Contest; Venue; 1997 | Succeeded by National Indoor Arena; Birmingham |
| Preceded by Green Glens Arena; Millstreet | Eurovision Song Contest; Venue; 1994, 1995 | Succeeded by Oslo Spektrum; Oslo |
