= Paul Wasserman =

- Born: July 30, 1934; Bronx, New York City, New York
- Died: November 18, 2007 (aged 73)
- Other name: "Wasso"
- Education: Fairfax High School, University of Southern California, Stanford Law School
- Occupations: Entertainment publicist, reporter
- Years active: 1950s-2000s
- Organization(s): Mahoney/Wasserman Public Relations, Wasserman Group
- Criminal charges: One felony count of grand theft
- Criminal penalty: Six months imprisonment

Paul Wasserman (July 30, 1934 – November 18, 2007) was an American entertainment publicist. After working as a journalist for United Press International and the Associated Press, in the 1960s, he began working in publicity as part of Mahoney/Wasserman Public Relations. In the late 1980s, Wasserman ran the entertainment publicity division for D'Arcy, Masius, Benton & Bowles, and in the 1990s he launched the Wasserman Group. He represented musicians such as U2, Paul Simon, Linda Ronstadt, The Rolling Stones and Bob Dylan, and actors such as Jack Nicholson, Dennis Hopper and Jack Lemmon. In 2000 Wasserman was jailed for six months for one felony count of grand theft, in particular using the names of his clients to help him sell bogus stock options.

== Early life and education ==
He was born on July 30, 1934 in the Bronx, New York. His parents were European immigrants, and the family moved to Los Angeles when he was around 3 years old. According to his colleague Jim Mahoney, Wasserman had a "strict L.A. Jewish upbringing". He graduated Fairfax High School, and enrolled in USC. In 1958, he dropped out of Stanford Law School, and decided on a career in journalism.

== Career ==
As a journalist, a story he wrote about Bob Hope for United Press International (UPI) resulted in a job offer from Hope's publicist. Publicist Jim Mahoney hired Wasserman in the 1960s when Wasserman was working as an Associated Press movie reporter, and Wasserman began handling movie publicity for the Jack Nicholson films Easy Rider (1969) and Five Easy Pieces (1970). Afterwards, he began publicizing recording artists as well. He helped with accounts for Frank Sinatra, Andy Williams, the Beach Boys, and Apple Records, the Beatles' record label.

In the late 1960s, Mahoney made Wasserman a financial partner, with their company renamed Mahoney/Wasserman Public Relations. Nicknamed "Wasso" by friends in the industry, clients included artists such as the Rolling Stones, the Who, Linda Ronstadt, Bob Dylan and Neil Diamond. He was also a music publicist for The Mamas and the Papas, James Taylor, Paul Simon and Tom Petty. Lou Adler stated to the Los Angeles Times that Wasserman "was one of the first ones to sort of accept and represent the new school of rock 'n' roll, so he was able to use the so-called old-school tools that he had in representing this new breed of people."

In 1975, he was working as a press agent for Mick Jagger. In one well-publicized incident in 1975, Wasserman camped out outside his client Jagger's hotel room all night, in order to secure an interview for reporter Bob Hilburn. Hilburn referred to Wasserman as "the most important rock publicist in town."

Wasserman was publicity agent for actor Freddie Prince when Prince killed himself at the age of 22 in 1977. In the film industry, he also represented Lee Marvin, Dennis Hopper, Jack Lemmon, Jack Nicholson and George C. Scott. He publicized individual films, for example Cat Ballou, Easy Rider, Annie Hall and Star Wars (1977). Wasserman conducted a campaign resulting in U2 appearing on the cover of TIME magazine in 1987. He also served as the publicist for the 1988 films Rattle and Hum and Colors.

In the late 1980s, Wasserman ran the entertainment publicity division for D'Arcy, Masius, Benton & Bowles. In the 1990s, he launched his own company the Wasserman Group. According to Mahoney, Wasserman struggled with addiction, at one point almost dying in New Orleans due to a drug problem. His close friends Lou Adler and Jack Nicholson stood vigil outside his hospital room.

== Personal life ==
In 2000, he was jailed for six months for an investment scheme, pleading guilty to grand theft. The conviction ended his career as a publicist. In 2000 Wasserman was jailed for one felony count of grand theft, using the names of his clients to help him sell bogus stock options. Wasserman pleaded guilty in Los Angeles Superior Court in 2000. The judge accepted Wasserman's plea and he was ordered to pay restitution of almost $87,000. Wasserman was also sentenced to 6 months in jail, 5 years of probation.

Wasserman personally attributed his Ponzi scheme to his problems with alcoholism, and later in his life, became devoted to Alcoholics Anonymous. According to his friend Joan Myers, he had been sober for two decades when he died.

He died at the age of 73 in 2007 of respiratory failure at Kindred Hospital in Los Angeles. He was buried at Mt. Sinai Memorial Park in LA.
