= Folkways: The Original Vision =

Folkways: The Original Vision was released in 1989 and is the first album created by Folkways Records under new acquisition by the Smithsonian Center for Folklife and Cultural Heritage following the death of the record label's founder, Moses Asch. Funds were raised for the acquisition of the label to be established as a non-profit entity in conjunction with the Smithsonian Institution by the collaborative recording A Vision Shared: A Tribute to Woody Guthrie and Lead Belly (Columbia Records, 1988) by artists such as Bruce Springsteen, Bob Dylan, and U2. Folkways: The Original Vision (Woody and LeadBelly) was digitally remastered and re-released in 2005 by Folkways Records.
