= Folkways: The Original Vision (Woody and LeadBelly) =

2005 re-release of a 1989 Folkways Records compilation

Compilation album by Woody Guthrie and Lead Belly
- Released: 2005
- Label: Smithsonian Folkways; Folkways Records

Released in 2005, Folkways: The Original Vision (Woody and LeadBelly) is an expanded rerelease of the 1989 album Folkways: The Original Vision, created by Smithsonian Folkways to document the origins of the Folkways Records label. The rerelease was created on the 15th anniversary of the original album, and included enhanced liner notes and six bonus tracks.

The recordings of Woody Guthrie and Lead Belly are showcased and complemented with a 28-page illustrated booklet, providing insight on the history and mission of Folkways Records.

== Track listing ==
1. "Vigilante Man"
2. "Gallis Pole"
3. "This Land Is Your Land"
4. "Talking Hard Work"
5. "Midnight Special"
6. "In the Pines"
7. "Pastures of Plenty"
8. "Car Song"
9. "We Shall Be Free"
10. "Bring Me a Little Water, Sylvie"
11. "Pretty Boy Floyd"
12. "Do-Re-Mi"
13. "I Ain't Got No Home in This World Anymore"
14. "Jesus Christ"
15. "Cotton Fields"
16. "Rock Island Line"
17. "Grand Coulee Dam"
18. "4, 5, and 9"
19. "Will Geer Reading Woody Guthrie"
20. "Hard Traveling"
21. "Fannin Street"
22. "Philadelphia Lawyer"
23. "Hobo's Lullaby"
24. "Bourgeois Blues"
25. "Grey Goose"
26. "Goodnight, Irene"
