= God Part II =

Song by U2

from the album Rattle and Hum
- Released: 10 October 1988
- Studio: Ocean Way
- Genre: Alternative rock
- Length: 3:15
- Label: Island
- Composer: U2
- Lyricist: Bono
- Producer: Jimmy Iovine

"God Part II" is a song by rock band U2, and the 14th track from their 1988 album Rattle and Hum.

== Content ==
It was written as an answer song to John Lennon's "God", having the same kind of lyrical structure. It also contains an attack on American biographer Albert Goldman, on the following verses, by way of Lennon's song "Instant Karma!":

I don't believe in Goldman
His type like a curse
Instant Karma's gonna get him
If I don't get him first

Additionally, the song alludes to Bruce Cockburn's "Lovers in a Dangerous Time", in the lyric "Heard a singer on the radio late last night/He says he's gonna kick the darkness 'til it bleeds daylight."

The song is a departure from the folksy-roots rock sound of the album's other studio recordings and is an introduction to the darker sound the band would adopt following the release of their next album, Achtung Baby.

A remix entitled the 'Hard Metal Dance Mix' was released on the "When Love Comes to Town" single.

== Live performance history ==
"God Part II" was only played on the Lovetown Tour in late 1989 and early 1990. It was played at 36 of the 47 concerts; it debuted at the first show of the tour on 21 September 1989 in Perth and was last performed at the second-last show of the tour on 9 January 1990 in Rotterdam. It was one of six songs to be used as concert openers on the tour, opening two concerts: 26 December 1989 in Dublin and 5 January 1990 in Rotterdam. For these two performances, its heavy bassline was linked to a recording of the Rolling Stones' "Sympathy for the Devil".

A performance from a Dublin show later saw light on the release Live from the Point Depot.

After the Lovetown Tour, its sole live appearance was as a brief lyrical snippet by Bono at the end of "With or Without You" on 23 April 1992 in Vancouver.

== See also ==
- List of covers of U2 songs - God Part II
