= Heartland (U2 song) =

Song by U2

from the album Rattle and Hum
- Released: 10 October 1988
- Recorded: 1986–1988
- Studio: Danesmoate (Dublin)
- Genre: Rock
- Length: 5:03
- Label: Island
- Composer: U2
- Lyricist: Bono
- Producer: Jimmy Iovine

"Heartland" is a song by rock band U2. It is included on their 1988 album Rattle and Hum and in the film of the same name.

== Details ==
"Heartland" originated from a trip that bassist Adam Clayton and lead singer Bono made. Bono claimed the song is full of little bits of travelogue from his journal.

The band began writing "Heartland" in 1984 during The Unforgettable Fire sessions, and it was worked on again during The Joshua Tree sessions. However, the song did not make the cut for The Joshua Tree as it wasn't completed in time and it was considered "too laid-back" to play live, so they chose "Trip Through Your Wires" instead.

It is the thirteenth track on their 1988 album Rattle and Hum, and was included in the film of the same name.

"Heartland" is the only track from the album not performed in concert on the Lovetown Tour, which began almost a year after Rattle and Hum's release.

== Personnel ==
U2

- Bono – lead vocals
- The Edge – guitar, keyboards, backing vocals
- Adam Clayton – bass guitar
- Larry Mullen Jr. – drums

Additional musicians

- Brian Eno – keyboards

Technical personnel

- Jimmy Iovine – production
- Kevin Kilen – recording
- Daniel Lanois – recording
- Thom Panunzio – mixing
- Pat McCarthy – recording assistance
- Clark Germain – assistant engineer
