= Harold Leventhal =

American music manager (1919–2005)

Harold Leventhal (May 24, 1919 – October 4, 2005) was an American music manager. Leventhal's career began as a song plugger for Irving Berlin and then Benny Goodman. While working for Goodman, he connected with a new artist, Frank Sinatra, booking him as a singer for a Benny Goodman event. Leventhal later managed The Weavers, Woody Guthrie, Pete Seeger, Alan Arkin, Judy Collins, Theodore Bikel, Arlo Guthrie, Joan Baez, Mary Travers, Tom Paxton, Don McLean and many others, and promoted major concert events in the genre, thus playing a significant role in the popularization and influence of American folk music in the 1950s and 1960s. He died in 2005 at the age of 86.

== Personal life ==
Born in Ellenville, New York, to Orthodox Jewish immigrants from Ukraine and Lithuania, Leventhal was eight weeks old when his father, Samuel, died in the 1918 influenza pandemic at the age of 34. His mother, Sarah, moved her five children to the Lower East Side, where she worked as the tenement's janitor to provide for her children. They then moved to the Bronx, where in 1935, at James Monroe high school, Leventhal, already a member of the Young Communist League, was arrested for organizing an "Oxford Pledge" strike, aimed at persuading students to refuse to fight further wars.

He lost his first factory job for union organizing, but his brother Herbert, a songwriter who at that time worked as a song plugger for Irving Berlin, got Harold an opportunity to work as an office boy for Berlin. Soon Harold was working as Berlin's "plugger" as well, taking his songs around the nightclubs to be bought by bandleaders such as Harry James, the Dorsey Brothers and Benny Goodman. He then joined Goodman's Regent Music Company, before enlisting in the army when the U.S. joined the Second World War. Assigned to India with the Signal Corps, Leventhal sought out the Congress movement, meeting Nehru and Gandhi. He later founded American Friends of India, and, at a 1954 party hosted by the Indian delegation to the United Nations, Leventhal met Nathalie Buxbaum, a UN guide, who was to become his wife. Leventhal and Buxbaum had two daughters and raised them on the Upper West Side of Manhattan.

== Folk music ==
After the war, while working for his brother Gabe's business, Youthcraft Foundations, Leventhal continued to be active in left-wing causes. Through reading Woody Guthrie's column in the Daily Worker, "Woody Sez," he became enamoured of folk music. His commitment to Pete Seeger and the Weavers and Woody Guthrie led to his representing more and more artists.

Two concerts in particular sealed Leventhal's fame. While working on the doomed 1948 presidential campaign of the progressive Henry Wallace, Leventhal met folk singer Pete Seeger, and soon became the manager of Seeger's group, The Weavers. After tremendous initial success with record selling songs such as "Goodnight Irene" and "Tzena, Tzena, Tzena," the group was Blacklisted as communists, and then had such difficulty finding a place to perform that they disbanded in 1952. But Leventhal's commitment to the group and their audience persisted, and in 1955 he organized a Christmas Eve Weavers reunion concert at New York City's Carnegie Hall, persuading the members to take part by convincing each one that the others had already agreed. The concert ignited the folk music boom of the late 1950s and early 1960s, which in turn led to Leventhal recognizing the talent of a 19-year-old Bob Dylan, and promoting his first concert, at the Town Hall in New York City in April 1963.

Denied a passport until 1955 because of his Communist sympathies, Leventhal organized world tours for folk singers that the U.S. State Department forbade from taking part in official cultural exchanges.

In the era of McCarthyism and the flowering of the American civil rights movement, folk music became a voice of the country's conscience, and Harold Leventhal was among those most responsible for making that voice heard. Leventhal was a committed leftist whose music business acumen turned him into folk music's most successful promoter. He was the model for the character Irving Steinbloom, the impresario immortalized in the 2003 movie comedy A Mighty Wind.

In 1988, Leventhal won a Grammy Award for Folkways: A Vision Shared, a tribute to Woodie Guthrie and Lead Belly. Leventhal was also a noted music publisher of folk songs including such titles as "Where Have All the Flowers Gone?" and "The First Time Ever I Saw Your Face."

== Other genres ==
Leventhal's tastes were eclectic, from Lightnin' Hopkins' blues to jazz greats such as Duke Ellington and Dexter Gordon to folk traditionalists Cisco Houston, Theodore Bikel, Oscar Brand and Mahalia Jackson. His reputation for getting black and women artists fair deals with record companies led to his representing many of the leading female folk singers, including Judy Collins, Miriam Makeba, Odetta, The Simon Sisters(Carly Simon), Buffy Sainte-Marie, Mary Travers, Joni Mitchell and Joan Baez. He represented Ireland's Clancy Brothers, Britain's Ewan MacColl, Donovan and Pentangle, and also had an eclectic international roster including Jacques Brel, Nana Mouskouri, Mercedes Sosa and Ravi Shankar. Leventhal produced concerts at venues such as Carnegie Hall for artists such as Pete Seeger, Johnny Cash, Bob Dylan, Neil Young, Phil Ochs, Arlo Guthrie, Peter, Paul and Mary, Chad Mitchell Trio ( John Denver), Neil Diamond, Joan Baez, Joni Mitchell, Judy Collins, and many others.

He had a knack for producing big shows that could focus the energy of an era. A birthday benefit concert for Martin Luther King Jr., at Carnegie Hall in January 1961, helped King appeal to the white general public. He produced fund raising tribute concerts for Phil Ochs, Paul Robeson, the Spanish Civil War's Abraham Lincoln Brigade and, most memorably, for Woody Guthrie in March 1956 and then again, after Guthrie's death, in 1968 and 1970.

After Guthrie's death in 1967, Leventhal virtually adopted Woody's son Arlo, who worked in his office before making his hit record "Alice's Restaurant". He helped produce the film based on that song, and later co-produced the Oscar-winning Bound for Glory starring David Carradine as Woody Guthrie. Among his other films was the Pete Seeger documentary A Song and a Stone (1972), the Weavers documentary Wasn't that a Time! (1984) and the Emmy-winning We Shall Overcome (1988). Leventhal also produced theatre, starting with his fellow blacklister Will Geer performing Mark Twain's America off-Broadway in 1952. Harold Leventhal was also integrally involved in the theatrical and film careers of both Alan Arkin and Theodore Bikel.

Reflecting his political and musical interests, he produced, among others, Joseph Heller's We Bombed in New Haven, Jules Epstein's But Seriously, Rabindranath Tagore's King of the Dark Chamber and Jules Feiffer's The White House Murder Case.

== Tribute ==
In 2003, Leventhal received his own tribute concert at Carnegie Hall. A film of that show, Isn't this a Time, was released in 2004. Leventhal may have been defined best in the program notes for that concert, as embodying the definition of the Yiddish word, mensch, meaning "man" in the sense of "an upright, honorable, decent person, someone of noble character". American singer-songwriter, Guthrie Thomas, stated, "Harold Leventhal was an instrumental key in keeping the art of folk music alive in the eyes of many thousands of listeners of the folk music style throughout the world and, equally as well as Alan Lomax."
