= Hawkmoon 269 =

Song by U2

from the album Rattle and Hum
- Released: 10 October 1988
- Studio: A&M (Los Angeles)
- Genre: Blues rock
- Length: 6:22
- Label: Island Records
- Composer: U2
- Lyricist: Bono
- Producer: Jimmy Iovine

"Hawkmoon 269" is a song by Irish rock band U2 and is the fourth track on their 1988 album, Rattle and Hum.

== Recording ==
"Hawkmoon 269" was recorded in Hollywood, California in Sunset Sound studios. The name "Hawkmoon" was supposedly inspired by the town of Hawkmoon, North Dakota, that U2 had passed through while on tour. However, there is no town in either North or South Dakota named Hawkmoon. This name may have been inspired by a Sam Shepard book. The number "269" in the title refers to the number of mixes the song went through before the final recorded version, according to the Edge, who said they spent three weeks on the track. Bob Dylan plays the Hammond organ on this track; he also collaborated with Bono on writing "Love Rescue Me" for Rattle and Hum. In addition, U2 covered the Dylan song "All Along the Watchtower" during a live performance that appears on Rattle and Hum.
