= When Love Comes to Town =

Single by U2 with B.B. King

from the album Rattle and Hum
- B-side: "Dancing Barefoot"
- Released: March 1989
- Recorded: 1987–1988
- Studio: Sun (Memphis)
- Genre: Blues rock
- Length: 4:15
- Label: Island
- Composer: U2
- Lyricist: Bono
- Producer: Jimmy Iovine

U2 singles chronology
"Angel of Harlem" (1988)	"When Love Comes to Town" (1989)	"All I Want Is You" (1989)

Music videos
- "Official Video" on YouTube; "Rattle & Hum Version" on YouTube

"When Love Comes to Town" is a song by Irish rock band U2 featuring American blues guitarist B.B. King. It is the twelfth track from U2's 1988 album, Rattle and Hum, and was released in 1989 as the record's third single. The song was recorded at the historic Sun Studio in Memphis. "When Love Comes to Town" reached number one in the Irish Singles Chart, number six in the UK Singles Chart, number ten in the Dutch Top 40, and number two in the US Mainstream Rock Tracks chart.

== History ==
On the extended "Live from the Kingdom Mix", Little Richard is featured preaching, rapping in funky rhyme style, and singing background vocals amid Maceo Parker's saxophone playing. The single contained two different versions of the Patti Smith song "Dancing Barefoot". The 7" and cassette featured the long version, while the 12" and CD contained the short version. While U2 has stopped regularly playing it live, it continued to be featured in B.B. King concerts. During the Lovetown Tour concerts, this song would be played, usually along with "Angel of Harlem" and "Love Rescue Me", in an encore featuring B.B. and his band.

Like the song "Van Diemen's Land", this song originally featured an extra verse:

When I woke up I was sleeping on the street
I felt the world was dancing, and I was dirt beneath their feet
When I woke up I saw the Devil looking down
But my Lord He played guitar the day love came to town

This verse was sung during the song's premiere in Fort Worth, Texas on U2's Joshua Tree Tour and does not appear in the studio version or subsequent live performances.

Cash Box described the song as a "solid blues rumble."

=== Live ===
The debut performance took place on 24 November 1987 in Fort Worth, Texas during the concert's encore and B.B. King joined U2 to perform the song. On 1989's Lovetown Tour, the song again featured during the encore and was played with B.B. King. It was played at 46 of the 47 shows; the only concert it missed was 18 December 1989 in Amsterdam, as the show concluded prematurely due to Bono suffering vocal problems.

On the next tour, 1992-93's Zoo TV Tour, "When Love Comes to Town" did not debut until the second-last concert of the first leg on 21 April 1992 in Tacoma. It appeared only infrequently on the second leg, in Europe, but on the third leg, in North America, it was performed frequently and this was continued on the fourth leg return to Europe. The Zoo TV Tour version of the song was stripped down in comparison to previous versions and was performed on a b-stage in the midst of the crowd. U2 would not perform the song for years after the fourth leg's final show on 28 August 1993 in Dublin, although B.B. King continued to play the song at his live shows.

On 26 October 2008, Bono and the Edge rejoined B.B. King to play the song for the Thelonious Monk Institute of Jazz Founders Award.

After King died on 14 May 2015, U2 paid tribute to him during a show in Vancouver the following night during the Innocence + Experience Tour by playing "When Love Comes to Town" for the first time in 23 years. The song was played three more times on the tour. The song was played at a promotional appearance at the Apollo Theater in New York during the Experience + Innocence Tour. The song was played with the Sun Ra Arkestra.

It was played on November 4, 2023 during the band’s residency at The Sphere in Las Vegas.

== Track listing ==
All lyrics are written by Bono; all music is composed by U2, except "Dancing Barefoot" (written by Patti Smith and Ivan Kral).

No.	Title	Producer	Length
1.	"When Love Comes to Town"	Jimmy Iovine	4:15
2.	"Dancing Barefoot"	U2	4:47
3.	"When Love Comes to Town" ("Live from the Kingdom" mix)	Louil Silas Jr.	7:28
4.	"God Part II" (Hard Metal dance mix)	Louil Silas Jr.	4:46

== Personnel ==
U2

- Bono – vocals, guitar
- The Edge – guitar
- Adam Clayton – bass guitar
- Larry Mullen Jr. – drums

Additional musicians

- B.B. King – vocals, guitar
- Rebecca Evans Russell, Phyllis Duncan, Helen Duncan – backing vocals

Technical personnel

- Jimmy Iovine – production
- Dave Ferguson – recording
- "Cowboy" Jack Clement – recording
- Shelley Yakus – mixing
- Rob Jacobs – mixing
- Randy Wine – assistant engineer

== Charts ==
=== Weekly charts ===
Weekly chart performance for "When Love Comes to Town"
Chart (1989)	Peak position
Australia (ARIA)	23
Belgium (Ultratop 50 Flanders)	16
Canada Top Singles (RPM)	41
Europe (Eurochart Hot 100)	21
Ireland (IRMA)	1
Italy (Musica e dischi)	13
Italy Airplay (Music & Media)	4
Netherlands (Dutch Top 40)	9
Netherlands (Single Top 100)	10
New Zealand (Recorded Music NZ)	4
Sweden (Sverigetopplistan)	20
UK Singles (Official Charts)	6
US Billboard Hot 100	68
US Alternative Airplay (Billboard)	10
US Mainstream Rock (Billboard)	2
West Germany (GfK)	64

Chart (2015)	Peak position
France (SNEP)	200

=== Year-end charts ===
Year-end chart performance for "When Love Comes to Town"
Chart (1989)	Position
Netherlands (Dutch Top 40)	96
US Album Rock Tracks (Billboard)	6

== In popular culture ==
The title is picked up by Tom Lennon in his 1993 book, the first gay book published in Ireland.

== See also ==
- List of covers of U2 songs – When Love Comes to Town
