= Desire (U2 song) =

1988 single by U2

Single by U2

from the album Rattle and Hum
- B-side: "Hallelujah Here She Comes"; "Desire" (Hollywood Remix)
- Released: 19 September 1988
- Studio: STS (Dublin)
- Genre: Rock and roll
- Length: 2:59
- Label: Island
- Composer: U2
- Lyricist: Bono
- Producer: Jimmy Iovine

U2 singles chronology
"One Tree Hill" (1988)	"Desire" (1988)	"Angel of Harlem" (1988)

Music video
- Official Video on YouTube; Hollywood Remix on YouTube

Audio sample
- file; help

"Desire" is a song by Irish rock band U2 and the third track on their 1988 album Rattle and Hum. It was released as the album's lead single on 19 September 1988 by Island Records, and became the band's first number-one single in Australia and on the United Kingdom Singles Chart. It reached number three on the Billboard Hot 100 in the United States, and topped both the Modern Rock Tracks and Mainstream Rock Tracks charts, making it the first song to reach number one on both charts simultaneously. It reached number two on the Dutch Top 40. The accompanying music video was directed by Richard Lowenstein and Lynn-Maree Milburn. At the 31st Annual Grammy Awards, "Desire" won the 1989 Grammy Award for Best Rock Performance by a Duo or Group with Vocal.

== History ==
U2 cite the Stooges' song "1969" as the primary influence on "Desire", which is an interpolation of the Bo Diddley beat. The band originally recorded a demo of the song at STS Studios in Dublin. After re-recording it at A&M Studios in Los Angeles, they agreed it sounded "tighter and more accurate", but according to guitarist the Edge, "it lacked feel". As a result, they abandoned the re-recording in favour of the original demo. The Edge later praised the song, saying it was "a rock & roll record – not a pop song".

"Desire" debuted live on the first night of the Lovetown Tour on 21 September 1989, and appeared at almost every concert on that tour. It segued into a cover of Bob Dylan's "All Along the Watchtower".

On the 1992–1993 Zoo TV Tour, "Desire" was re-invented with different effects on the Edge's guitar, and it opened most encores. Bono would use the song to accentuate characteristics of his onstage alter egos Mirror Ball Man and MacPhisto. On the 1997-1998 PopMart Tour, Bono and the Edge would play the song acoustically. For the 2001 Elevation Tour, it was a stripped-down electric version played at the tip of a heart-shaped walkway that extended into the audience. Adam Clayton would join in with bass just before the bridge, and Larry Mullen, Jr. played along on a single drum.

On 15 October 2004, at an appearance on the British television series Top of the Pops promoting the How to Dismantle an Atomic Bomb album, Bono and Edge performed a rough electric version. On the Vertigo Tour, "Desire" was not played at all on the first three legs, and appeared just once in an acoustic form on the 2006 fourth leg in response to a fan's request in São Paulo. It made a full electric debut at the beginning of the fifth leg at the second show in Sydney; this performance was ramshackle and it was refined before appearing at four subsequent concerts. "Desire" was played sporadically during the 2009-2011 U2 360° Tour, usually played in a semi-acoustic form. On one occasion, it was combined with Bruce Springsteen's "She's the One". It was played semi-regularly on the 2015 Innocence + Experience Tour during their B-stage set, often with Bono bringing someone from the crowd to play guitar with the band.

The song was not performed at all on The Joshua Tree Tour 2017 tour, making it the first tour on which the song was not performed. It returned to the setlist for the 2019 tour, being played to close the main set in rotation with "Angel of Harlem". The song was played at every date of the North American leg of the 2018 Experience + Innocence Tour in a remixed form, taking influences from the Hollywood Remix.

"Desire"'s B-side "Hallelujah (Here She Comes)" has never been played in full live by U2 but was debatably snippeted once during "Bullet the Blue Sky".

"Desire" has appeared on two U2 compilation albums, The Best of 1980–1990 (1998) and U218 Singles (2006).

An early version of the song appears in the form of a studio performance in the 1988 film Rattle and Hum. "Desire" has furthermore appeared on 1994's Zoo TV: Live from Sydney (as a bonus track from a different concert), PopMart: Live from Mexico City (1998), Elevation 2001: Live from Boston, and U2 Go Home: Live from Slane Castle, Ireland (2003).

== Critical reception ==
Cash Box magazine said of it, that "Bono and U2 go for the groove, a 'Magic Bus'-like throb that harkens back to who knows Who." Caren Myers from Melody Maker noted, "This is a very trad rock number, with one of those heavy clap-along rhythms, a secular lust song with harmonica, but it stops well short of exciting." Jack Barron from NME wrote, "Well, its startling. A return to basic roots rock after the eerie, panoramic soundscapes of 'The Unforgettable Fire' and to a lesser extent, 'The Joshua Tree'. Gone is the cathedral of riding textural space illuminated by The Edge's pristine stained glass guitar and Bono's fervent purity Vox. And gone too is the openly spiritual facet to be supplanted by what appears to be fervented sensuality. On 'Desire' everything is sweat shrunk, the band's stadium ethereality has been compacted down to club level."

== Music video ==
The music video for "Desire" was filmed in Hollywood, California and directed by Richard Lowenstein and Lynn-Maree Milburn. It is the Hollywood remix version of the song, with band members and local people in assorted places in the city, supplemented by random images pertaining to references in the song.

== Track listings ==
MC: Island / CISX400 (promotional cassette)
No.	Title	Length
1.	"Desire" (Hollywood remix)	5:23

MC: Island / 99250-4
No.	Title	Length
1.	"Desire"	2:59
2.	"Hallelujah (Here She Comes)"	4:12

12": Island / 12ISX400 (promotional 12")
No.	Title	Length
1.	"Desire" (Hollywood remix)	9:23

7": Island / IS400 and ISG400
No.	Title	Length
1.	"Desire"	2:59
2.	"Hallelujah (Here She Comes)"	4:12

12": Island / 12IS400 and 12ISG400
No.	Title	Length
1.	"Desire"	2:59
2.	"Hallelujah (Here She Comes)"	4:12
3.	"Desire" (Hollywood remix)	5:23

CD: Island / CIDP400
No.	Title	Length
1.	"Desire"	2:59
2.	"Hallelujah (Here She Comes)"	4:12
3.	"Desire" (Hollywood remix)	5:23

== Personnel ==
U2

- Bono – lead vocals, harmonica
- The Edge – guitar, backing vocals
- Adam Clayton – bass guitar
- Larry Mullen Jr. – drums

Guest musicians

- Alexandra Brown – backing vocals on Hollywood Remix
- Edna Wright – backing vocals on Hollywood Remix

Technical personnel

- Jimmy Iovine – production
- Paul Barnett – recording
- Shelley Yakus – mixing
- Rob Jacobs – mixing
- Randy Wine – assistant engineer
- Pat McCarthy – recording assistance

== Charts ==
=== Weekly charts ===
Weekly chart performance for "Desire"
Chart (1988)	Peak position
Australia (ARIA)	1
Austria (Ö3 Austria Top 40)	19
Belgium (Ultratop 50 Flanders)	7
Canada Top Singles (RPM)	1
Europe (Eurochart Hot 100)	2
Finland (Suomen virallinen lista)	2
France (SNEP)	37
Greece (IFPI)	2
Ireland (IRMA)	1
Italy (Musica e dischi)	1
Italy Airplay (Music & Media)	17
Netherlands (Dutch Top 40)	2
Netherlands (Single Top 100)	2
New Zealand (Recorded Music NZ)	1
Norway (VG-lista)	5
Spain (AFYVE)	1
Sweden (Sverigetopplistan)	5
Switzerland (Schweizer Hitparade)	9
UK Singles (OCC)	1
US Billboard Hot 100	3
US Cash Box Top 100	2
US Album Rock Tracks	1
US Hot Dance Music/Club Play Remix	37
US Modern Rock Tracks	1
West Germany (GfK)	9

=== Year-end charts ===
1988 year-end chart performance for "Desire"
Chart (1988)	Position
Australia (ARIA)	28
Belgium (Ultratop)	52
Canada Top Singles (RPM)	5
Europe (Eurochart Hot 100)	49
Netherlands (Single Top 100)	14
New Zealand (Recorded Music NZ)	3
UK Singles (OCC)	45
US Billboard Hot 100	56
US Modern Rock Tracks (Billboard)	3

== Certifications ==
Certifications and sales for "Desire"
Region	Certification	Certified units/sales
Canada (Music Canada)	Gold	50,000^{^}
New Zealand (RMNZ)	Gold	10,000^{*}
United Kingdom (BPI)	Silver	250,000^{^}
United States (RIAA)	Gold	500,000^{^}
^{*} Sales figures based on certification alone.^{^} Shipments figures based on certification alone.

== See also ==
- List of Billboard Mainstream Rock number-one songs of the 1980s
- List of Billboard Modern Rock Tracks number ones of the 1980s
- List of covers of U2 songs – Desire
- List of number-one singles from the 1980s (New Zealand)
- List of number-one singles in Australia during the 1980s
- List of number-one singles of 1988 (Ireland)
- List of UK singles chart number ones of the 1980s
