= Angel of Harlem =

1988 single by U2

Single by U2

from the album Rattle and Hum
- B-side: "A Room at the Heartbreak Hotel, Love Rescue Me (live from Rattle and Hum)"
- Released: 5 December 1988
- Recorded: 1987
- Studio: Sun (Memphis)
- Genre: Heartland rock; soul
- Length: 3:47
- Label: Island
- Composer: U2
- Lyricist: Bono
- Producer: Jimmy Iovine

U2 singles chronology
"Desire" (1988)	"Angel of Harlem" (1988)	"When Love Comes to Town" (1989)

Music video
- "Angel of Harlem" on YouTube

"Angel of Harlem" is a song by Irish rock band U2. It is the tenth track on their 1988 album Rattle and Hum, and was released as its second single in December 1988. It topped the charts in Canada and New Zealand, and peaked at number nine on the UK Singles Chart, number eight on the Dutch Top 40, number 14 on the Billboard Hot 100, and number one on the Mainstream Rock Tracks chart. Written as a homage to Billie Holiday, it was released with two different B-sides; one was an original U2 song called "A Room at the Heartbreak Hotel", while the other was a live version of Rattle and Hum's "Love Rescue Me".

== Content ==
The lyrical content of the song refers to various New York City-area landmarks, including John F. Kennedy International Airport, WBLS radio, and Harlem. It also refers to jazz-related history including John Coltrane and A Love Supreme, Birdland club, Miles Davis and Billie Holiday ("Lady Day").

== History ==
"Angel of Harlem" was written during 1987's Joshua Tree Tour in "a time of experimentation" and immersion by U2 in "the various facets of American roots music". U2 lead singer Bono has said that the writing of the song was inspired by U2's initial trip to New York City.

'We landed in JFK and we were picked up in a limousine. We had never been in a limousine before, and with the din of punk rock not yet faded from our ears, there was a sort of guilty pleasure as we stepped into the limousine. Followed by a sly grin, as you admit to yourself this is fun.

We crossed Triborough Bridge and saw the Manhattan skyline. The limo driver was black and he had the radio tuned to WBLS, a black music station. Billie Holiday was singing. And there it was, city of blinding lights, neon hearts. They were advertising in the skies for people like us, as London had the year before'.

— Bono,

The in-studio performance of "Angel of Harlem" that was included in the Rattle and Hum movie dates from a recording session at Sun Studio in Memphis, Tennessee, during the later stages of the third leg of the Joshua Tree Tour.

Cash Box said it is "not their most inspiring cut, but there is a familiarity of sound that should bode for radio play".

The song has also been performed on 2009's U2 360° Tour with dedications to Michael Jackson, and included snippets of "Man in the Mirror" and "Don't Stop 'til You Get Enough". In the Berlin concert of the 360° Tour three young fans from Prague, Czech Republic, held signs asking to play "Angel of Harlem" together with U2, Bono invited them to the stage, the band lent them the instruments and they played the song together.

The song was performed sporadically during 2015's Innocence + Experience Tour and The Joshua Tree Tour 2019. It was also played at 16 of the 40 concerts from the band's 2023–2024 residency U2:UV Achtung Baby Live at Sphere.

== Track listings ==
7-inch and cassette release
No.	Title	Length
1.	"Angel of Harlem"	3:47
2.	"A Room at the Heartbreak Hotel"	5:29

12-inch and CD release
No.	Title	Length
1.	"Angel of Harlem"	3:47
2.	"A Room at the Heartbreak Hotel"	5:29
3.	"Love Rescue Me" (Live in London, England, 16 October 1988; featuring Ziggy Marley and Keith Richards)	5:24

== Personnel ==
U2

- Bono – vocals, guitar
- The Edge – guitar, backing vocals
- Adam Clayton – bass guitar
- Larry Mullen Jr. – drums

Guest musicians

- Joey Miskulin – organ
- The Memphis Horns – brass

Technical personnel

- Jimmy Iovine – production
- Dave Ferguson – recording
- "Cowboy" Jack Clement – recording
- Randy Wine – assistant engineer

== Charts ==
=== Weekly charts ===
Chart (1988–1989)	Peak position
Australia (ARIA)	18
Belgium (Ultratop 50 Flanders)	23
Canada Top Singles (RPM)	1
Europe (Eurochart Hot 100)	26
Finland (Suomen virallinen lista)	19
Ireland (IRMA)	3
Italy (Musica e dischi)	7
Italy Airplay (Music & Media)	18
Netherlands (Dutch Top 40)	8
Netherlands (Single Top 100)	10
New Zealand (Recorded Music NZ)	1
Spain (AFYVE)	11
Switzerland (Schweizer Hitparade)	25
UK Singles (Official Charts)	9
US Billboard Hot 100	14
US Adult Contemporary (Billboard)	38
US Alternative Airplay (Billboard)	3
US Mainstream Rock Airplay (Billboard)	1
West Germany (GfK)	31

Chart (2016)	Peak position
Poland Airplay (ZPAV)	100

=== Year-end charts ===
Chart (1989)	Position
Canada Top Singles (RPM)	24
New Zealand (Recorded Music NZ)	23
US Album Rock Tracks (Billboard)	3
US Modern Rock Tracks (Billboard)	9

== See also ==
- List of covers of U2 songs – Angel of Harlem
