= Lovetown Tour =

1989–90 concert tour by U2

- Tour by U2
- Location: Oceania; Asia; Europe
- Associated album: Rattle and Hum
- Start date: 21 September 1989
- End date: 10 January 1990
- Legs: 2
- No. of shows: 47
- Supporting acts: Weddings Parties Anything; B.B. King

U2 concert chronology
- The Joshua Tree Tour (1987); Lovetown Tour (1989–1990); Zoo TV Tour (1992–1993)

The Lovetown Tour was a concert tour by the Irish rock band U2, which took place in late 1989 and early 1990 following the release of Rattle and Hum. It was documented by noted rock film director Richard Lowenstein in the "LoveTown" documentary.

== Itinerary ==
While the tour was limited in scope, it reached places that The Joshua Tree Tour had missed, all the while avoiding the United States entirely.

The tour's opening night was on 21 September 1989 at the Entertainment Centre in Perth, Australia. The first leg took place over the next 10 weeks in Australia, New Zealand, and Japan. A brief second leg hit four countries in Europe for four weeks, ending on 10 January 1990 at the Sport Paleis Ahoy in Rotterdam, Netherlands. Of the tour's 47 concerts, 23 were played in Australia.

== Show overview ==
Songs played on the tour largely coincided with those played on The Joshua Tree Tour, also including then-new songs from Rattle and Hum including a nightly cover of Bob Dylan's All Along the Watchtower in a version obviously influenced by that of Jimi Hendrix. The band, however, delighted fans by sometimes shifting its setlist from night to night and with uncharacteristic guitar soloing by The Edge. Many songs performed on the tour would not be performed again for many years, if ever, as the band subsequently shifted its sound dramatically on the album Achtung Baby with tours in the 1990s that featured more choreographed performances and largely emphasized newer material. The tour marked the end of the band's long-time practice of concluding nearly every concert with the song "40", which featured the band leaving the stage one-by-one and the audience chanting the chorus. This practice was not resurrected until 15 years later, during the Vertigo Tour. Notably absent from the tour was the song Sunday Bloody Sunday, which had been a live staple and which would be featured in all subsequent tours. Other songs performed included "Slow Dancing" and "She's a Mystery to Me", written for Willie Nelson and Roy Orbison, respectively. Both artists would go on to record the respective songs, with Orbison's recording being featured on his final, posthumously released album, Mystery Girl, which was named for the song. B. B. King toured with the band and played the first set each night. At the end of U2's set, King and his band joined them for a short encore.

The tour was plagued by troubles with Bono's voice due to both excessive use and illness - he stated in concert that he caught "some pretty psychedelic germs" in Australia and that they were "having their Annual General Meeting" in his throat. These vocal troubles meant three Sydney concerts had to be postponed. Later, severe troubles meant concerts in Dortmund and Amsterdam had to prematurely conclude; two other Amsterdam shows were cancelled and replaced by four shows in Rotterdam, causing the tour to spill over into 1990 instead of ending on New Year's Eve at Dublin's Point Depot as planned. However, when Bono's voice was not troubling him, he had an impressive singing range, with the falsetto later mastered starting to seriously appear, but without sacrificing the powerful depth of his lower singing range.

As with all U2 tours from 1983 on, the stage and lighting design was done by Willie Williams. The tour name, possibly a contraction of the Rattle and Hum song "When Love Comes to Town", was the first not to be named for the band's then-current album; as of 2018, all of their subsequent tours have also had different names from any album, with the exception of the 30th anniversary tours of The Joshua Tree.

== "LoveTown" documentary ==
The "LoveTown" documentary featured performances filmed primarily on 18 November 1989 at Sydney Entertainment Centre in Sydney, Australia. The film opened with "Hawkmoon 269", and featured live renderings of "Desire", "All Along the Watchtower", "MLK", "All I Want Is You", "Van Diemen's Land," "God Part II", "When Love Comes to Town", and "Love Rescue Me". The documentary was interspersed with interviews with the band members and Sydney locals, as well as a radio performance of an early version of "Slow Dancing," a song Bono wrote for Willie Nelson.

== "Dream it all up again" ==
The 31 December 1989, Dublin concert was broadcast on RTÉ and BBC radio around the world, giving many fans their only taste of the tour; it was widely bootlegged and ultimately officially released in digital form in 2004 as Live from the Point Depot. It was during the 30 December Dublin show the night before, however, that Bono, apparently dissatisfied with the band's stagnation, famously said:

"I was explaining to people the other night, but I might've got it a bit wrong – this is just the end of something for U2. And that's what we're playing these concerts – and we're throwing a party for ourselves and you. It's no big deal, it's just – we have to go away and ... and dream it all up again."

This foreshadowed the abrupt directional changes the band would take in the 1990s, beginning with Achtung Baby and the Zoo TV Tour.

== Tour dates ==
Date	City	Country	Venue	Opening Act(s)
Leg 1: Oceania and Asia
21 September 1989	Perth	Australia	Perth Entertainment Centre	Weddings Parties Anything; B.B. King
22 September 1989	Perth	Australia	Perth Entertainment Centre	Weddings Parties Anything; B.B. King
23 September 1989	Perth	Australia	Perth Entertainment Centre	Weddings Parties Anything; B.B. King
27 September 1989	Sydney	Australia	Sydney Entertainment Centre	Weddings Parties Anything; B.B. King
28 September 1989	Sydney	Australia	Sydney Entertainment Centre	Weddings Parties Anything; B.B. King
29 September 1989	Sydney	Australia	Sydney Entertainment Centre	Weddings Parties Anything; B.B. King
2 October 1989	Brisbane	Australia	Brisbane Entertainment Centre	Weddings Parties Anything; B.B. King
3 October 1989	Brisbane	Australia	Brisbane Entertainment Centre	Weddings Parties Anything; B.B. King
4 October 1989	Brisbane	Australia	Brisbane Entertainment Centre	Weddings Parties Anything; B.B. King
7 October 1989	Melbourne	Australia	National Tennis Centre	Weddings Parties Anything; B.B. King
8 October 1989	Melbourne	Australia	National Tennis Centre	Weddings Parties Anything; B.B. King
9 October 1989	Melbourne	Australia	National Tennis Centre	Weddings Parties Anything; B.B. King
12 October 1989	Melbourne	Australia	National Tennis Centre	Weddings Parties Anything; B.B. King
13 October 1989	Melbourne	Australia	National Tennis Centre	Weddings Parties Anything; B.B. King
14 October 1989	Melbourne	Australia	National Tennis Centre	Weddings Parties Anything; B.B. King
16 October 1989	Melbourne	Australia	National Tennis Centre	Weddings Parties Anything; B.B. King
20 October 1989	Sydney	Australia	Sydney Entertainment Centre	Weddings Parties Anything; B.B. King
21 October 1989	Sydney	Australia	Sydney Entertainment Centre	Weddings Parties Anything; B.B. King
27 October 1989	Adelaide	Australia	Memorial Drive Park	Weddings Parties Anything; B.B. King
28 October 1989	Adelaide	Australia	Memorial Drive Park	Weddings Parties Anything; B.B. King
4 November 1989	Christchurch	New Zealand	Lancaster Park	B.B. King
8 November 1989	Wellington	New Zealand	Athletic Park	B.B. King
10 November 1989	Auckland	New Zealand	Western Springs Stadium	B.B. King
11 November 1989	Auckland	New Zealand	Western Springs Stadium	B.B. King
17 November 1989	Sydney	Australia	Sydney Entertainment Centre	Weddings Parties Anything; B.B. King
18 November 1989	Sydney	Australia	Sydney Entertainment Centre	Weddings Parties Anything; B.B. King
19 November 1989	Sydney	Australia	Sydney Entertainment Centre	Weddings Parties Anything; B.B. King
23 November 1989	Yokohama	Japan	Yokohama Arena	Weddings Parties Anything; B.B. King
25 November 1989	Tokyo	Japan	Tokyo Dome	Weddings Parties Anything; B.B. King
26 November 1989	Tokyo	Japan	Tokyo Dome	Weddings Parties Anything; B.B. King
28 November 1989	Osaka	Japan	Osaka-jō Hall	Weddings Parties Anything; B.B. King
29 November 1989	Osaka	Japan	Osaka-jō Hall	Weddings Parties Anything; B.B. King
1 December 1989	Osaka	Japan	Osaka-jō Hall	Weddings Parties Anything; B.B. King
Leg 2: Europe
11 December 1989	Paris	France	Palais Omnisports Bercy	B.B. King
12 December 1989	Paris	France	Palais Omnisports Bercy	B.B. King
14 December 1989	Dortmund	West Germany	Westfalenhalle	B.B. King
15 December 1989	Dortmund	West Germany	Westfalenhalle	B.B. King
16 December 1989	Dortmund	West Germany	Westfalenhalle	B.B. King
18 December 1989	Amsterdam	Netherlands	RAI Europe Hal	B.B. King
~~19 December 1989~~	Amsterdam	Netherlands	RAI Europe Hal	B.B. King
~~20 December 1989~~	Amsterdam	Netherlands	RAI Europe Hal	B.B. King
26 December 1989	Dublin	Ireland	Point Depot	B.B. King
27 December 1989	Dublin	Ireland	Point Depot	B.B. King
30 December 1989	Dublin	Ireland	Point Depot	B.B. King
31 December 1989	Dublin	Ireland	Point Depot	B.B. King
5 January 1990	Rotterdam	Netherlands	Ahoy	B.B. King
6 January 1990	Rotterdam	Netherlands	Ahoy	B.B. King
9 January 1990	Rotterdam	Netherlands	Ahoy	—N/a
10 January 1990	Rotterdam	Netherlands	Ahoy	—N/a

== See also ==
- Timeline of U2
