= Jesus Christ (Woody Guthrie song) =

Woody Guthrie song

Song by Woody Guthrie
- Written: 1940
- Released: 1956
- Recorded: 1944
- Genre: American folk
- Songwriter(s): Woody Guthrie

"Jesus Christ" is a song written in 1940 by Woody Guthrie. The song tells in eight verses what Jesus preached in his time, especially about the rich and the poor, and that he was killed by different groups who rejected his preaching ("they laid Jesus Christ in his grave"). The ninth verse says that Jesus would have been killed by modern capitalist society just as he was in his own time. The song was partially sung and played on the piano by the Guthrie character in the 1976 biographical film Bound For Glory, set to the same tune as the folk ballad "Jesse James".

"I wrote this song looking out of a rooming house window in New York City in the winter of Nineteen and Forty. I thought I had to put down on paper how I felt about the rich folks and the poor ones."

== Covers ==
The song was among others covered by Irish band U2, whose version appeared on the 1988 Guthrie tribute album Folkways: A Vision Shared.

== See also ==
- Jesus Christ in popular culture
