= Folkways: A Vision Shared =

Folkways: A Vision Shared – A Tribute to Woody Guthrie & Leadbelly

Compilation album by Various artists
- Released: August 23, 1988
- Genre: Folk
- Length: 45:55
- Label: CBS
- Producer: Harold Leventhal

Folkways: A Vision Shared – A Tribute to Woody Guthrie & Leadbelly is a 1988 album featuring songs by Woody Guthrie and Lead Belly interpreted by leading folk, rock, and country recording artists. It won a Grammy Award the same year.

Produced by Harold Leventhal, Guthrie's long-time business manager and folk music and theatrical impresario, the album received widespread critical acclaim and included performances by Guthrie's son, Arlo Guthrie, and also: Bob Dylan, Fishbone, Emmylou Harris, Little Richard, John Mellencamp, Willie Nelson, Pete Seeger, Bruce Springsteen, Sweet Honey in the Rock, Little Red School House Chorus (Sarah St. Onge, director), Taj Mahal, U2, and Brian Wilson.

== Track listing ==
=== Side one ===
1. "Sylvie" (Lead Belly) - Sweet Honey in the Rock – 2:01
2. "Pretty Boy Floyd" (Woody Guthrie) - Bob Dylan – 4:34
3. "Do Re Mi" (Woody Guthrie) - John Mellencamp – 3:23
4. "I Ain't Got No Home" (Woody Guthrie) - Bruce Springsteen – 3:40
5. "Jesus Christ" (Woody Guthrie) - U2 – 3:13
6. "Rock Island Line" (Lead Belly) - Little Richard with Fishbone – 2:32
7. "East Texas Red" (Woody Guthrie) - Arlo Guthrie – 5:34

=== Side two ===
1. "Philadelphia Lawyer" (Woody Guthrie) - Willie Nelson – 2:59
2. "Hobo's Lullaby" (Goebel Reeves; performed by Woody Guthrie) - Emmylou Harris – 2:41
3. "The Bourgeois Blues" (Lead Belly) - Taj Mahal – 2:43
4. "Grey Goose" (traditional; performed by Lead Belly) - Sweet Honey in the Rock – 2:07
5. "Goodnight, Irene" (Lead Belly) - Brian Wilson – 2:38
6. "Vigilante Man" (Woody Guthrie) - Bruce Springsteen - 4:09
7. "This Land Is Your Land" (Woody Guthrie) - Pete Seeger with Sweet Honey in the Rock, Doc Watson & The Little Red School House Chorus – 3:45
