= In God's Country =

- North American single picture sleeve

Single by U2

from the album The Joshua Tree
- B-side: "Bullet the Blue Sky"; "Running to Stand Still"
- Released: 17 November 1987
- Recorded: 1986
- Studio: Windmill Lane (Dublin)
- Genre: Rock
- Length: 2:57
- Label: Island
- Composer: U2
- Lyricist: Bono
- Producers: Daniel Lanois; Brian Eno

U2 singles chronology
"Where the Streets Have No Name" (1987)	"In God's Country" (1987)	"One Tree Hill" (1988)

Music video
- "In God's Country" on YouTube

"In God's Country" is a song by the rock band U2. It is the seventh track from their fifth studio album The Joshua Tree and was released as the album's fourth single in November 1987 in North America only.

== Recording and composition ==
"The desert was immensely inspirational to us as a mental image for this record. Most people would take the desert on face value and think it's some kind of barren place, which of course is true. But, in the right frame of mind it's also a very positive image, because you can actually do something with a blank canvas, which is effectively what the desert is."

—Adam Clayton, on the song's desert imagery

"In God's Country" was a difficult song for the band to record, which they attributed to not being trained musicians, and they do not speak very highly of it. During The Joshua Tree sessions, they knew it was not going be one of their best songs but they needed more uptempo songs. It was developed out of Bono's frustration at trying to get "a bit of rock 'n' roll out of [U2 guitarist] the Edge". Bono tried to inspire the Edge by teasing and playing on his competitive instincts by claiming to be a better guitarist. Of the song, Bono said "[My] lyric was really good, the tune is pretty good, and the hook is pretty average - thanks to the Edge."

"In God's Country" was recorded in the basement of the Edge's house, which producer Daniel Lanois called a "muggy little room where everything sounds dead" and "not a particularly inspiring place". Despite the location, he said the recording worked because of the "spontaneity and lack of pressure", which contributed to a good take, a quality Lanois favours to overplanning the recording setup. In producing the song, he used a collection of channels in the mixing console designated as sound treatments to adjust the tone of the Edge's guitar to give it a "beautiful shimmer", which he thought contributed to the song's mood. Lanois said, "What was a fairly straightforward rock track is now undermined by a mood of unrest", which inspired lead vocalist Bono to change his lyrics to give them more dimension.

Bono has stated that he originally didn't know whether the song was about Ireland or the United States, but eventually dedicated it to the Statue of Liberty. The song characterises the United States as a "desert rose" and a siren whose dress is torn in "ribbons and bows," a depiction both "sad and seductive". The lyric speaks of a lack of political ideas in the West which Bono later contrasted to the revolution in Nicaragua where he had travelled during the recording of The Joshua Tree. Along with "Where the Streets Have No Name," the lyrics and sound of "In God's Country" reference the desert in accordance with the band's wish for The Joshua Tree to have a "cinematic" sense of location.

Played in the key of D, the verses of the studio version alternates between D and A minor chords. The first chorus repeats an Em–G–D chord progression while the second chorus repeats a C–G–D progression.

== Release and critical reception ==
"In God's Country" was released as a single in Canada and the United States in November 1987. The cover art (photographed by Anton Corbijn), sleeve (designed by Steve Averill), and B-sides ("Bullet the Blue Sky" and "Running to Stand Still") were identical to those used for U2's 1988 single "One Tree Hill," released only in New Zealand and Australia. The Canadian release was available on 7", 12" and cassette, while the US release was limited to 7" only.

"In God's Country" reached number 44 on the Billboard Hot 100 and number 48 in the United Kingdom as an import. It was slightly more successful in Canada, peaking at number 25 in 1988. Sales of the single may have been hampered by the fact that its B-sides were two tracks from The Joshua Tree album instead of the usual non-album tracks. An abridged live version of the song recorded on the Joshua Tree Tour appeared on the band's 1988 rockumentary, Rattle and Hum, but did not appear on the accompanying album of the same name.

The single's video appears on Outside It's America, a documentary tracking the band's first few weeks on tour through the American Southwest in 1987. The music video visualized the Irish immigrant experience and the complexities of the American Dream. It was ultimately not released to MTV or other outlets. The video was finally released on the band's YouTube channel on 19 February 2021.

Hot Press editor and long-time U2 supporter, Bill Graham, described the song as "... U2 cruising, a starter and not a main course ..." and referring to the lyrical cliches, he said the song was "... saved by the fact that [Bono] does Bono better than anybody else." Cash Box called it a "haunting rocker [that] is led by Bono's passionate, stirring: vocal ability."

== Track listing ==
No.	Title	Length
1.	"In God's Country"	2:57
2.	"Bullet the Blue Sky"	4:32
3.	"Running to Stand Still"	4:20

== Personnel ==
- Bono – vocals, guitar
- The Edge – guitar, backing vocals
- Adam Clayton – bass guitar
- Larry Mullen Jr. – drums

== Charts ==
Chart (1987–1988)	Peak position
Canada RPM Top 100	25
UK Singles Chart	48
US Billboard Hot 100	44
US Billboard Album Rock Tracks	6

== See also ==
- List of covers of U2 songs - In God's Country
