= With or Without You =

1987 single by U2

- Artwork variant for 7-inch release

Single by U2

from the album The Joshua Tree
- B-side: "Luminous Times (Hold on to Love)"; "Walk to the Water"
- Released: 16 March 1987
- Recorded: 1986
- Studio: Danesmoate House (Dublin)
- Genre: Rock
- Length: 4:56
- Label: Island
- Composer: U2
- Lyricist: Bono
- Producers: Daniel Lanois; Brian Eno

U2 singles chronology
"The Unforgettable Fire" (1985)	"With or Without You" (1987)	"I Still Haven't Found What I'm Looking For" (1987)

Audio sample
- file; help

Music video
- Official Video on YouTube; Alternate Video on YouTube

"With or Without You" is a song by Irish rock band U2. It is the third track on their fifth studio album, The Joshua Tree (1987), and was released as the album's lead single on 16 March 1987. The song was the group's most successful single at the time, becoming their first number-one hit in both the United States and Canada by topping the Billboard Hot 100 for three weeks and the RPM national singles chart for one week, with a further three weeks at number two.

"With or Without You" features sustained guitar parts played by guitarist the Edge with a prototype of the Infinite Guitar, along with vocals by lead singer Bono and a bassline by bassist Adam Clayton. The rock ballad originated from a demo recorded in late 1985 that the group continued to work on throughout The Joshua Tree sessions. Ostensibly a song about troubled love, the track's lyrics were inspired by Bono's conflicting feelings about the lives he led as a musician and domestic man.

Critics praised the song upon its release. It is frequently performed on the band's tours, and it has appeared on many of their compilation albums and concert films. "With or Without You" is U2's second most frequently covered song. In 2004, Rolling Stone magazine ranked the song 131st on its list of "The 500 Greatest Songs of All Time".

== Writing and recording ==
In late 1985, U2 convened at a house that drummer Larry Mullen Jr. bought to review material the group had written during The Unforgettable Fire Tour. During this time, a rough demo of "With or Without You" was written, with lead vocalist Bono composing the song's chord sequence. The band continued to work on the song at STS Studios, creating many permutations of the track, but not making any progress. Guitarist the Edge considered the song at that point to be "awful". The track consisted of a Yamaha drum machine beat and a bass part played by bassist Adam Clayton using an Ibanez bass guitar with a short scale. According to Clayton, these early versions of the song sounded too sentimental and "very traditional because the chords just went round and round and round".

The sessions for The Joshua Tree started in earnest in 1986, and U2 were recording at the Georgian mansion Danesmoate House in Dublin. The group attempted to take the song in a different direction, although Bono was reluctant. Under the direction of co-producers Brian Eno and Daniel Lanois, the Edge pursued more ambient guitar playing, Clayton turned up the volume on his bass, and Mullen experimented with an electronically enhanced drum kit. Despite the work they continued to put into the track, the group considered abandoning the song, as they could not find an arrangement they liked.

Bono and his friend Gavin Friday continued to work on the song after Lanois and Eno declined to do so. Bono credits Friday with rescuing the song and rearranging it, believing it could be a hit. Eno added a keyboard arpeggio, similar to the one from "Bad". The song's fate was still in doubt when the Edge was sent a prototype of the Infinite Guitar by Canadian musician Michael Brook, with whom he had collaborated for the 1986 Captive soundtrack. The instrument allowed sustained notes to be played, producing "a similar effect to the E-Bow", but with the ability to provide all the "mid-points between no sustain and infinite sustain" that the E-Bow cannot provide. The prototype included elaborate assembly instructions and as the Edge recollects, "one wrongly placed wire and you could get a nasty belt of electricity. This piece of gear would have failed even the most basic of safety regulations." On subsequent tours, his guitar technician occasionally received electric shocks from the instrument when preparing it for performances.

Listening to the backing track to "With or Without You" in the control room, Bono and Friday heard the sustained effect that the Edge was creating with the Infinite Guitar in the other room. The combination of the two playing simultaneously caught their attention. According to Lanois, "I said, 'That sounded pretty cool,' so we listened back and I said, 'Jesus, it's better than I thought.'" The Edge immediately recorded an Infinite Guitar part in two takes. The band considers the song's recording to be one of the album sessions' breakthrough moments, as it was recorded amid concerns that they had run out of ideas.

Eno sequenced the song's electronic drum beat on the Yamaha DX7 synthesiser. Rather than connect it to the recording equipment via a DI unit and maintain the instrument's pristine sound, the producers plugged it into a Mesa Boogie guitar amplifier and then miked it to give the sound more personality. As a result, Lanois said it sounded "more like people playing in a room". The sequenced beat was chosen to give the song a feeling of discipline, so that when Mullen's acoustic drums enter the song, "they mean something", in Lanois' words.

Producer Steve Lillywhite was hired by U2 in December 1986 to help mix some songs for The Joshua Tree; "With or Without You" was one of them. While Lillywhite and engineer Mark Wallis were mixing it, Eno entered the room and told them that he wanted to change the introduction. Wallis said: "And it was kind of awe-inspiring because he said, 'Right, send this guitar through those ten effects over there and send that guitar through those ten effects over there and then feed them back to each other.' So what started as a traditional bit of rhythm guitar, bass, and drums suddenly became something quite otherworldly and spiritual, and the sound of the music you were hearing started to give you a feeling of where the song was going to go prior to the lyric. I thought that was really visionary." Ultimately, "With or Without You" was the most debated song of those on which Lillywhite worked, as Eno and Lanois each had ideas different from his. Lillywhite, who wanted a more mainstream approach to his mix, favoured "a little more crash, bang" sound to Mullen's drums that enter later in the song, while Eno preferred that the drums remain "more mysterious and more supportive".

Bono wrote the lyrics during his first night visiting the Côte d'Azur in 1986, while struggling to reconcile his responsibilities as both a married man and a musician. His wanderlust in belonging to a musical act was often at odds with his domestic life. While writing the lyrics, he realised that neither facet of his life defined him, but rather the tension between the two did. He explained that the final lyric is about torment and how repressing desires only makes them stronger.

== Composition ==
"With or Without You" is written in a 4/4 time signature and is played at a tempo of 110 beats per minute. Although certain stanzas of lyrics are repeated, the song does not follow a traditional verse-chorus form. Lanois says of it, "It has tension and builds like one of those great Roy Orbison songs, where every section is unique and never repeats. I like that kind of sophistication [...]."

The song structure is more complex than most songs in popular music. It goes like so: 1st Verse, 2nd Verse, 1st Chorus, 3rd Verse, 2nd Chorus, 1st Pre-Chorus, Middle Eight, 2nd Pre-Chorus, 3rd Chorus, Bridge, 4th Chorus, Outro.

The song begins with a minimal drum beat of eighth notes played by Mullen, while a backing track—Eno's synthesiser—plays a "rippling" triplet arpeggio of the chord D major. A high sustained guitar part (played by The Edge's Infinite Guitar) enters, played "dry" in the left channel before reverberating on the right. At 0:09, Clayton's bass guitar begins to play eighth notes in time with the kick drum, and the song's four-bar sequence of the chord progression D–A–Bm–G, begins. This chord progression is never explicitly played but is "implied" by the root notes played by Clayton and the guitar parts of The Edge.

"Notes actually do mean something. They have power. I think of notes as being expensive. You don't just throw them around. I find the ones that do the best job and that's what I use. I suppose I'm a minimalist instinctively. I don't like to be inefficient if I can get away with it. Like on the end of 'With or Without You'. My instinct was to go with something very simple [...]. I still think it's sort of brave, because the end of "With or Without You" could have been so much bigger, so much more of a climax, but there's this power to it which I think is even more potent because it's held back."

— The Edge, on the song's concluding guitar figure

Bono's vocals enter at 0:28 in a low register, a stark contrast from Bono's typical singing style to that point in the group's career. He stays below the middle C for the first two and a half stanzas, centering his melody on the mediant F♯. At the end of each of the first two stanzas, his vocals drop an octave, from A to A. Author Susan Fast called Bono's vocals on "With or Without You" the first occasion on which he "extended his vocal range downward in an appreciable way". At 0:58, an additional sustained guitar part joins the mix. The drums increase in intensity at 1:45, before The Edge begins playing the song's signature guitar riff at 1:53. The riff, a perfect fifth opening to a sixth, features a prominent use of delay. When the riff is played, it is answered by Bono singing "And you give yourself away", a line on which backing vocals appear at 2:06 and 2:32.

A stanza begins in which Bono sings the song's title in a high, passionate voice as the drums get heavier. At 3:03, the song bursts out in emotion as Bono begins open-throated "Oh-oh-oh-ohh" vocals, which are double-tracked, and the rhythm increases to play sixteenth notes on the guitar, cymbals, and tambourine. After another stanza of Bono repeating the song's title, the music dies down at 3:38 to a similar state as it was at the beginning of the song. Ten seconds later, Bono sings in a falsetto while a bass synthesiser doubles the bass guitar. After the vocals complete, The Edge begins a simple guitar figure. He explained that its understated nature was meant to resist the temptation to play an intricate guitar solo as an ending. The second time the figure is played, the signature guitar riff from earlier re-appears and the song regains some of its intensity. The song concludes with a fade-out.

The lyrics ostensibly describe a troubled relationship between two lovers, although the lyrics have been interpreted in religious contexts. The Washington Post interpreted the song as both an acerbic love song and a tune lamenting the moral contradictions one faces with their religious faith. Toby Creswell echoed these sentiments, saying it "can be read as a song about either marital romance or spiritual need". Bono explained that the lyrics had romantic intentions, saying, "there's nothing more revolutionary than two people loving each other. One, 'cause it's so uncommon these days, and two, 'cause it's so difficult to do." In 1987, Bono explained that "And you give yourself away" lyric refers to how he sometimes feels exposed being in U2, and that his openness, both to the public and music press, can do damage to the group. Author Niall Stokes interpreted the line as encompassing the theme of "surrendering the ego" to one's love and spiritual faith. According to Bono, the song was heavily influenced by Scott Walker's 1984 album Climate of Hunter.

== Release and chart performance ==
The band's manager Paul McGuinness was resistant to U2 releasing "With or Without You" as a single, as he thought it was too sonically unusual for release. Gavin Friday, having helped the band complete the track, disagreed and thought it would be a "certain No. 1". The song was selected as the lead single from The Joshua Tree. United States radio stations were allowed to play the song at 11:30 a.m. on 4 March 1987, with strong warnings by Island Records against playing it earlier. The single was released on 16 March 1987, two weeks after the album was released. It was the group's first single to be widely issued on compact disc. Clayton referred to the song's nature as a challenge to radio, saying, "You don't expect it there [on radio]. In church perhaps."

"With or Without You" debuted at number 64 on the US Billboard Hot 100 chart, and on 16 May 1987, it topped the chart to become U2's first number-one single in the US, proving Friday's prediction true. The song spent three weeks atop the chart, and 18 weeks in total on the Hot 100. The song also topped Billboard's Album Rock Tracks chart, Canada's RPM Top 100, and the Irish Singles Chart. According to Billboard, the song was the group's breakthrough with American audiences. The single peaked at number four on the UK Singles Chart, spending 11 weeks in the top 75 of the chart. The single also peaked at number two on the Dutch MegaCharts Top 40. In 2009, the song re-entered the UK Singles Chart at number 43 on the week ending 31 May, based on download sales due to Shaun Smith's performance of the song in the series 3 semi-final of Britain's Got Talent.

Two videos were shot in Dublin in February 1987 and were co-directed by Meiert Avis and Matt Mahurin. The first includes abstracts shots of dancer (and Edge's future wife) Morleigh Steinberg edited in between shots of the band playing the song. A second alternative version can be found in the Super Deluxe version of the album. On 15 March 2024, the song became the first U2 song to reach 1 billion streams on Spotify.

== Live performances ==
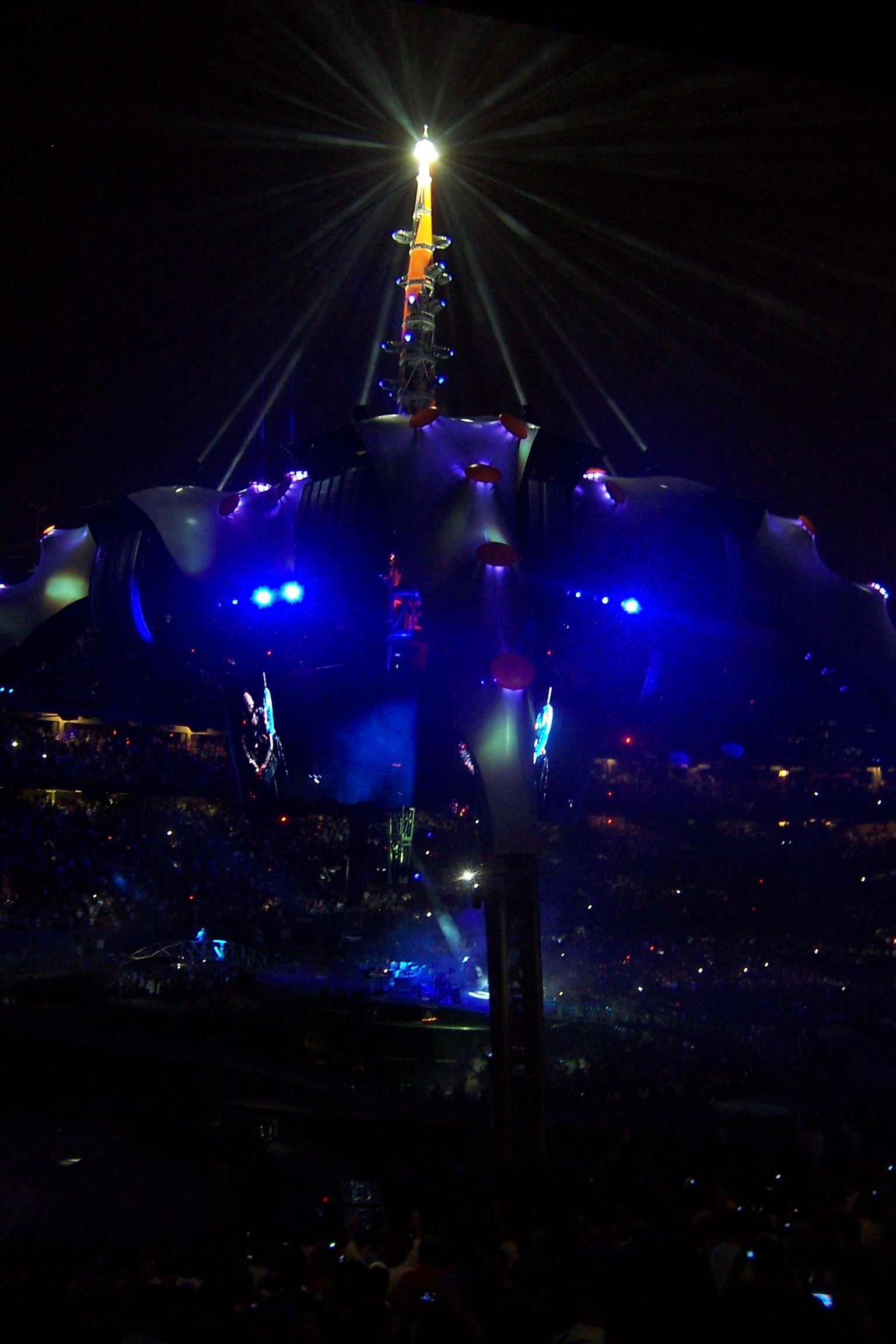
Lighting effects during a performance of "With or Without You" on the U2 360° Tour.

"With or Without You" was first played live at the second show on the Joshua Tree Tour on 4 April 1987, and was a regular for the rest of that tour. It was played at most shows on 1989's Lovetown Tour. During these tours, two extensions to the song not present on the studio version were played: an extra verse with lyrics that typically read "We'll shine like stars in the summer night/We'll shine like stars in the winter light/One heart, one hope, one love" or modifications thereof, which appears in the 1988 Rattle and Hum movie; and a snippet of Joy Division's "Love Will Tear Us Apart" (along with the "shine like stars" lyrics) which can be heard in the live album and concert film Live from Paris. Since the PopMart Tour, it has been more common for Bono to repeat the "Ohh" at the climax of the song, with the "shine like stars" verse sung rarely.

"With or Without You" was played at most Zoo TV Tour concerts and every concert on the PopMart Tour. It was dropped from the set list during the third leg of the Elevation Tour. It was initially a rare inclusion during the Vertigo Tour - over the two months of the tour's first leg, it was only played four times. It became a regular concert inclusion during stadium concerts on the second leg in Europe and remained in the set list for the third leg. It has been played on every night of the U2 360° Tour, occasionally with the "shine like stars" coda. The song regularly closed out the main set on the Innocence + Experience Tour, again occasionally with the "shine like stars" coda. The song was performed at every concert on the Joshua Tree Tours 2017 and 2019. It was also performed at all 40 shows of their 2023–2024 residency U2:UV Achtung Baby Live at Sphere in the Las Vegas Valley.

Live performances of the song also appear in the group's concert films Zoo TV: Live from Sydney (1994), PopMart: Live from Mexico City (1998), Elevation 2001: Live from Boston (2001), U2 Go Home: Live from Slane Castle, Ireland (2003), Vertigo 05: Live from Milan (2006), U2 3D (2008), U2360° at the Rose Bowl (2010), and Innocence + Experience: Live in Paris (2016).

== Reception ==
The song received universal acclaim from critics. Rolling Stone called it an "inventively arranged tune... that builds from a soothing beginning to a resounding climax". Bill Graham of Hot Press praised the song, suggesting it may be Bono's "most controlled vocal, building from an almost conversational first verse over a bare rhythm section to a soul-baring confession". Graham suggested the lyric "And you give yourself away" was essential to U2's message. The Sunday Independent suggested that the song was proof the band could be commercially accessible, yet not resort to rock clichés. NME called it "some kind of love song" and found musical and lyrical symmetry between the song and the group's 1981 album October.

Mike DeGagne of AllMusic praised the song for Eno's and Lanois's "gleaming" production work, Bono's vocals and "poetic deftness", and for The Edge's "astute but assertive" guitar playing. DeGagne described Bono's singing as "unleashing all his vocal power, moving from a soft, subtle intro and middle to an explosive burst of unyielding energy toward the end". He made religious comparisons to the musical arrangement, saying the "discerning air sounds almost church-like as it slowly unravels". Tom Breihan of Stereogum described the song as a power ballad with a "beautiful" build. "It hits all the marks that power ballads are supposed to hit — the soft beginning, the slow ramp-up, the eventual catharsis — but it makes those beats feel instinctive, not cynical. Nothing about “With or Without You” feels cynical. It feels like a great unburdening, a pent-up howl at the heavens. It's operatic nonsense, and it's great spectacle." Readers of Rolling Stone voted "With or Without You" the "Best Single" in a 1987 end-of-year poll, while it finished in 15th place on the "Best Singles" list from The Village Voice's 1987 Pazz & Jop critics' poll.

== Legacy ==
"With or Without You" has become one of U2's best-known songs, and it often appears in music critics' rankings of the best songs of all time. In 2000, the song appeared at number eight on Rolling Stone's list of "100 Greatest Pop Songs", compiled by Rolling Stone and MTV music critics to rank songs released since The Beatles' breakthrough. In 2005, Blender ranked the song at number 268 on its list of "The 500 Greatest Songs Since You Were Born". The following year, readers of Q voted "With or Without You" the 17th-greatest song in history. In 2012, Slant Magazine listed "With or Without You" as the 40th best single of the 1980s. Music television network VH1 ranked the song number 13 on the "100 Greatest Songs of the 80s" countdown in its series The Greatest. In 2004, Rolling Stone placed the song at number 131 on its list of "The 500 Greatest Songs of All Time"; the song was re-ranked to 132nd on the magazine's 2010 version of the list, and to 211th on the 2021 version. The song appeared as one of seven U2 songs in Toby Creswell's 2006 music reference book 1001 Songs: The Great Songs of All Time and the Artists, Stories, and Secrets. Creswell said the song struck a perfect balance between the "vigour and spit and attitude" of the group's teenage years and their new-found appreciation for the "power of understatement". In 2019, Rolling Stone ranked the song number seven on their list of the 50 greatest U2 songs, and in 2020, The Guardian ranked the song number four on their list of the 40 greatest U2 songs. U2 included the song on their compilation albums The Best of 1980–1990 (1998) and U218 Singles (2006) and reworked and re-recorded it for Songs of Surrender (2023). In 2022, Vulture placed the song at number 12 on its ranking of all 234 U2 songs.

== In popular culture ==
In the NBC sitcom Friends, the song is the theme song of the relationship between Ross Geller (David Schwimmer) and Rachel Green (Jennifer Aniston). It is first played in the 1995 season 2 episode "The One with the List", wherein Ross apologizes to Rachel for the list he made in which he described the negative attributes of Rachel. Rachel then prevents the song from continuing after ringing up the radio station, informing them about what Ross did.

The song is featured in the 1994 film Blown Away, as well as in "START", the 2018 season 6 series finale episode of the series The Americans.

A piano cover of the song featured in series 4, episode 6 of the series Sex Education in 2023.

== Track listing ==
No.	Title	Writer(s)	Producer	Length
1.	"With or Without You"	U2	Daniel Lanois, Brian Eno	4:55
2.	"Luminous Times (Hold on to Love)"	U2, Brian Eno	Daniel Lanois, Brian Eno, U2	4:33
3.	"Walk to the Water"	U2	Daniel Lanois, Brian Eno, U2	4:49

== Personnel ==
U2

- Bono – vocals
- The Edge – guitar
- Adam Clayton – bass guitar
- Larry Mullen Jr. – drums

Additional personnel

- Daniel Lanois – production, tambourine
- Brian Eno – keyboards, DX7 programming, production
- Flood – recording
- Pat McCarthy – recording assistance
- Steve Lillywhite – mixing

== Charts ==
=== Weekly charts ===
Weekly chart performance for "With or Without You"
Chart (1987–1988)	Peak position
Australia (Kent Music Report)	9
Austria (Ö3 Austria Top 40)	15
Belgium (Ultratop 50 Flanders)	3
Canada Top Singles (RPM)	1
Europe (European Hot 100 Singles)	1
Finland (Suomen virallinen lista)	5
France (SNEP)	10
Ireland (IRMA)	1
Italy (Musica e dischi)	18
Italy Airplay (Music & Media)	2
Netherlands (Dutch Top 40)	2
Netherlands (Single Top 100)	2
New Zealand (Recorded Music NZ)	5
South Africa (Springbok Radio)	11
Spain (AFYVE)	5
Sweden (Sverigetopplistan)	13
Switzerland (Schweizer Hitparade)	10
UK Singles (Official Charts)	4
UK Airplay (Music & Media)	1
US Billboard Hot 100	1
US Adult Contemporary (Billboard)	23
US Album Rock Tracks (Billboard)	1
US Cash Box Top 100	1
West Germany (GfK)	7

=== Year-end charts ===
1987 year-end chart performance for "With or Without You"
Chart (1987)	Position
Australia (Australia Music Report)	67
Belgium (Ultratop 50 Flanders)	30
Europe (European Hot 100 Singles)	4
Netherlands (Dutch Top 40)	19
Netherlands (Single Top 100)	10
New Zealand (RIANZ)	32
UK Singles (OCC)	45
US Billboard Hot 100	15
US Album Rock Tracks (Billboard)	4
US Cash Box Top 100	12
West Germany (Media Control)	32

2012 year-end chart performance for "With or Without You"
Chart (2012)	Position
France (SNEP)	195

== Certifications ==
Certifications and sales for "With or Without You"
Region	Certification	Certified units/sales
Austria (IFPI Austria)	Gold	50,000^{*}
Brazil (Pro-Música Brasil) Digital	Gold	30,000^{‡}
Brazil (Pro-Música Brasil) DMS	Gold	30,000^{*}
Canada (Music Canada)	Gold	50,000^{^}
Denmark (IFPI Danmark)	2× Platinum	180,000^{‡}
France (SNEP)	Platinum	200,000^{‡}
Germany (BVMI)	Platinum	600,000^{‡}
Italy (FIMI)	2× Platinum	140,000^{‡}
New Zealand (RMNZ)	5× Platinum	150,000^{‡}
Portugal (AFP)	Platinum	40,000^{‡}
Spain (Promusicae)	3× Platinum	180,000^{‡}
United Kingdom (BPI)	4× Platinum	2,400,000^{‡}
^{*} Sales figures based on certification alone.^{^} Shipments figures based on certification alone.^{‡} Sales+streaming figures based on certification alone.

== See also ==
- List of cover versions of U2 songs - With or Without You
