= The Joshua Tree =

Studio album by U2
- Released: 9 March 1987
- Recorded: January 1986 – January 1987
- Studios: STS; Danesmoate House; Melbeach; Windmill Lane (Note: STS Studios, Danesmoate House, and Melbeach are uncredited in the album's liner notes as recording locations. They are listed based on the band members' and producers' accounts of the sessions.)
- Genre: Rock
- Length: 50:11
- Label: Island
- Producers: Daniel Lanois; Brian Eno

U2 chronology
Wide Awake in America (1985)	The Joshua Tree (1987)	Rattle and Hum (1988)

Singles from The Joshua Tree
- 1. "With or Without You" Released: 16 March 1987; 2. "I Still Haven't Found What I'm Looking For" Released: 25 May 1987; 3. "Where the Streets Have No Name" Released: 31 August 1987; 4. "In God's Country" Released: 16 November 1987 (North America only); 5. "One Tree Hill" Released: 7 March 1988 (Australia and New Zealand only)

The Joshua Tree is the fifth studio album by the Irish rock band U2. It was produced by Daniel Lanois and Brian Eno, and was released on 9 March 1987 by Island Records. In contrast to the ambient experimentation of their 1984 album The Unforgettable Fire, for The Joshua Tree the band aimed for a harder-hitting sound within the limitation of conventional song structures. The album is influenced by American and Irish roots music, and through sociopolitically conscious lyrics embellished with spiritual imagery, it contrasts the group's antipathy for the "real America" with their fascination with the "mythical America". The record's theme was inspired by their experiences in the United States, as well as American literature and politics.

Recording began in January 1986 in Ireland, and to foster a relaxed, creative atmosphere, the group primarily recorded in two houses. Several events during the sessions helped shape the conscious tone of the album, including the band's participation in the Conspiracy of Hope benefit concerts for Amnesty International, the death of their roadie Greg Carroll, and lead vocalist Bono's travels to Central America. Recording was completed in November 1986; additional production continued into January 1987. U2 sought a "cinematic" quality that would evoke a sense of location, in particular, the open spaces of the U.S. They represented this in the sleeve photography depicting them in American desert landscapes.

The Joshua Tree received critical acclaim, increasing U2's stature significantly. It topped the charts in over 20 countries − including the U.S., marking the group's first number one there. It produced the hit singles "With or Without You", "I Still Haven't Found What I'm Looking For", and "Where the Streets Have No Name", the first two of which became the group's only number-one singles in the U.S. The Joshua Tree won Grammy Awards for Album of the Year and Best Rock Performance by a Duo or Group with Vocal at the 1988 ceremony. The Joshua Tree Tour was the highest-grossing North American tour of 1987 and marked U2's first time performing in stadiums.

Frequently listed among the greatest albums of all time, The Joshua Tree is one of the world's best-selling albums as well as U2's best-selling album, with over 25 million copies sold, including a diamond certification in the U.S. U2 commemorated the record's 20th anniversary with a remastered re-release, and its 30th anniversary with concert tours and a reissue. In 2014, The Joshua Tree was inducted into the Grammy Hall of Fame, and was selected for preservation in the U.S. National Recording Registry, having been deemed "culturally, historically, or aesthetically significant" by the Library of Congress.

== Background ==
Prior to The Joshua Tree, U2 had released four studio albums and were an internationally successful band, particularly as a live act having toured every year in the 1980s. The group's stature and the public's anticipation for a new album grew following their 1984 record The Unforgettable Fire, their subsequent tour, and their participation in Live Aid in 1985. U2 began writing new material in mid-1985 following the Unforgettable Fire Tour.

U2's manager Paul McGuinness recounted that The Joshua Tree originated from the band's "great romance" with the United States, as they had toured the country for up to five months per year in the first half of the 1980s. Leading up to the album sessions, U2's lead vocalist Bono read the works of American writers such as Norman Mailer, Flannery O'Connor, and Raymond Carver so as to understand, in the words of Hot Press editor Niall Stokes, "those on the fringes of the promised land, cut off from the American dream". Following a September–October 1985 humanitarian visit to Egypt and Ethiopia with his wife Ali, Bono said: "Spending time in Africa and seeing people in the pits of poverty, I still saw a very strong spirit in the people, a richness of spirit I didn't see when I came home... I saw the spoiled child of the Western world. I started thinking, 'They may have a physical desert, but we've got other kinds of deserts.' And that's what attracted me to the desert as a symbol of some sort."

After recording vocals for Steven Van Zandt's anti-apartheid project Sun City in August 1985, Bono made an additional contribution to the album in October that was inspired by his burgeoning interest in roots music. While in New York, he spent time with musicians Keith Richards and Mick Jagger, who played him blues and country music. Bono was embarrassed by his lack of familiarity with the genres, as most of U2's musical knowledge began with punk rock in their youth in the mid-1970s. He realised that U2 "had no tradition" and felt as if they "were from outer space". This inspired him to write the blues-influenced song "Silver and Gold", which he recorded with Richards and Ronnie Wood and convinced Van Zandt to add to Sun City. Until that time, U2 had been apathetic towards roots music, but after spending time with the Waterboys and fellow Irish band Hothouse Flowers, they felt a sense of indigenous Irish music blending with American folk music. Nascent friendships with Bob Dylan, Van Morrison, and Richards encouraged Bono to look back to rock's roots and to focus on building his skills as a songwriter and lyricist. He explained: "I used to think that writing words was old-fashioned, so I sketched. I wrote words on the microphone. For The Joshua Tree, I felt the time had come to write words that meant something, out of my experience." Dylan told Bono about his own debt to Irish music, while Bono further demonstrated his interest in music traditions in his duet with Irish Celtic and folk group Clannad on the 1986 track "In a Lifetime".

"We had experimented a lot in the making of [The Unforgettable Fire]. We had done quite revolutionary things... So we felt, going into The Joshua Tree, that maybe options were not a good thing, that limitations might be positive. And so we decided to work within the limitations of the song as a starting point. We thought: let's actually write songs. We wanted the record to be less vague, open-ended, atmospheric and impressionistic. To make it more straightforward, focused and concise."

— The Edge, on the band's approach to The Joshua Tree

U2 wanted to build on the textures of The Unforgettable Fire, but in contrast to that record's often out-of-focus experimentation, they sought a harder-hitting sound within the limitations of conventional song structures. The group referred to this approach as working within the "primary colours" of rock music—guitar, bass, and drums. U2's guitarist the Edge was more interested in the European atmospherics of The Unforgettable Fire and was initially reluctant to follow Bono's lead to seek a more American sound. The Edge was eventually swayed after discovering blues and country artists such as Howlin' Wolf, Robert Johnson, Hank Williams, and Lefty Frizzell on American public radio stations during the Unforgettable Fire Tour. Despite lacking a consensus on their musical direction, the group members agreed that they felt disconnected from the dominant synthpop and new wave music of the time, and they wanted to continue making music that contrasted with these genres.

Following six months' break, in late December 1985, U2 reconvened at their drummer Larry Mullen Jr. had newly purchased to begin writing and rehearsals for the new album. They worked on ideas including demos that would evolve into "With or Without You", "Red Hill Mining Town", and "Trip Through Your Wires", as well as a song called "Womanfish". The Edge recalled it as a difficult period with a sense of "going nowhere", although Bono was set on America as a theme for the album. Demo sessions held in early 1986 at STS Studios in Dublin with producer Paul Barrett saw the development of "With or Without You", "Red Hill Mining Town" and the genesis of "Bullet the Blue Sky".

== Recording and production ==
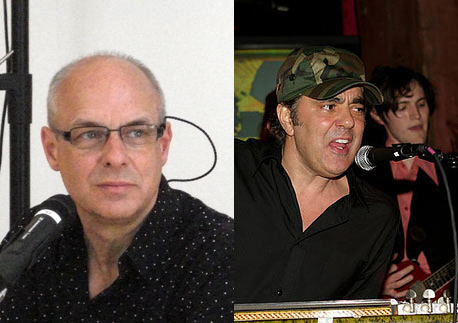
Brian Eno and Daniel Lanois produced the album, their second time working with U2.

Based on their success with producers Brian Eno and Daniel Lanois on The Unforgettable Fire, U2 wanted the duo to produce their new album. Mullen was excited about working with them again, as he felt the pair, Lanois in particular, were the band's first producers who "really [took] an interest in the rhythm section". Mark "Flood" Ellis was selected as the engineer, marking the first time he worked with U2. The band were impressed by his work with Nick Cave, and Bono's friend Gavin Friday recommended Flood based on their work experiences together when Friday was a member of the Virgin Prunes. U2 asked Flood for a sound that was "very open... ambient... with a real sense of space of the environment you were in", which he thought was a very unusual request at that time.

Intending to release an album in late 1986, U2 set up a studio in January of that year in Danesmoate House, a Georgian house in Rathfarnham, Ireland, in the foothills of the Wicklow Mountains. The Edge had viewed the residence months prior while househunting with his wife and convinced the owner to rent it to the band. Their plan was to find inspiration from the converted recording space and use it to musically create atmosphere, much like they did with Slane Castle for The Unforgettable Fire sessions in 1984.

A makeshift control room with tape machines, a mixing console, and other outboard equipment was set up in Danesmoate's dining room, with the adjacent drawing room used for recording and performing. The large doors separating the rooms were replaced with a glass screen, and to maintain a relaxed "non-studio" atmosphere for the sessions, the control room was dubbed the "lyric room" and the recording space was called the "band room". Lanois' strategy was to encourage the band members to have their parts worked out in advance and to capture as much of the essence of a live band take as possible, without overdubbing as a fallback option; the group first adopted this approach while making The Unforgettable Fire. To support the setup of all band members recording in a room together, Lanois eschewed having them wear headphones in favour of using monitor speakers due to their power; Mullen and U2's bassist Adam Clayton used two each. To aid in sound isolation, gobos were built in the drawing room, although the production staff still faced issues with audio spill from the monitor speakers. Lanois said that due to the setup, "you have to make a commitment to what you put down and either use it or throw it all away." This recording setup was duplicated at subsequent locations during the album sessions. However, two songs − "I Still Haven't Found What I'm Looking For" and "Mothers Of The Disappeared" − were exceptions to the live take method, being constructed via overdubs around drum tracks from Mullen that were kept from previous recordings.

U2's initial time at Danesmoate was spent recording and refining "extensive demos" that the Edge anticipated could turn into final backing tracks. They began with their usual songwriting methods of sorting through tapes from soundcheck jams, working through Bono's lyric book, and recording jam sessions. The sessions saw the group's songwriting beginning to evolve; not all material was being worked out as a band, but rather Bono and the Edge often brought basic song ideas to Mullen and Clayton. According to Mullen, it took a longer time to write and develop the songs than it did to eventually record them. The group were first joined at Danesmoate by Eno, with Flood and fellow engineer Dave Meegan recording their jams. Meegan said of Eno's involvement: "Usually he was in first every morning and he'd start some dodgy sequence on his DX-7 [synthesiser]—it would be just like a cello line with no intentions of ever staying forever, just something to inspire people when they walked into the room." In March 1986, after completing Peter Gabriel's So, both Lanois and engineer Kevin Killen joined U2 for initial recordings at Danesmoate, although Killen left after two weeks to work with Howard Jones. One of the first songs worked on was "Heartland", which originated during The Unforgettable Fire sessions and was later released on the band's 1988 album, Rattle and Hum. The arrangements for "With or Without You" and "I Still Haven't Found What I'm Looking For" were completed early in the Danesmoate sessions, giving the band the confidence to experiment. According to Lanois, the album was recorded in short stints; he, Eno and Flood would work with the band for two weeks at a time, while the band continued writing and refining the songs in between. The producers encouraged an interest in songs with older musical influences, especially American roots music. More contemporary references included the textural guitar work of the Smiths and My Bloody Valentine. The band's musical vocabulary had improved after their previous album, facilitating communication and collaboration with the production team.

The band found Danesmoate to have a very creative atmosphere, but according to the Edge, they "just couldn't settle in". The large drawing room, with a tall ceiling and wooden floors, created an "ear-splitting" drum sound that caused issues for the group. Lanois had a higher opinion of the house, saying: "It was loud, but it was really good loud, real dense, very musical. In my opinion it was the most rock and roll room of the lot." According to him, "the Danesmoate sessions were the backbone of the tonality of the record—we got a lot of the drums done in there." He thought that the house sounded better than Slane Castle, and he was particularly impressed with the drawing room's "low mid-range ... where the music lives", a property that he believes was a major factor in the success of The Joshua Tree.

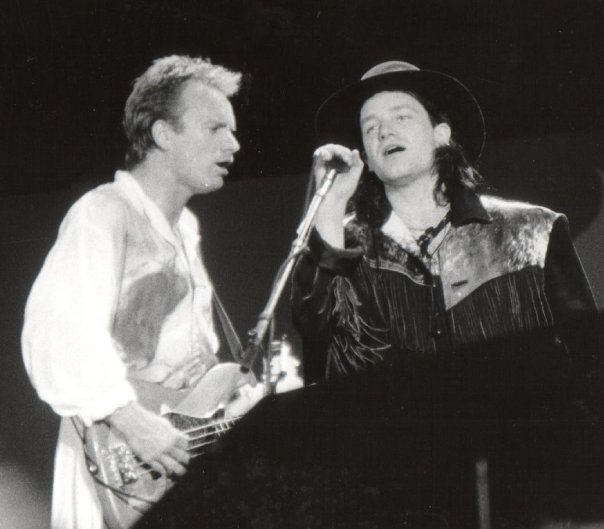
Sting and Bono performing during A Conspiracy of Hope in June 1986. U2's appearance on the tour helped them focus their new material being written for The Joshua Tree.

Over the course of recording The Joshua Tree, the band twice paused to participate in benefit concerts. On 17 May 1986, U2 performed at Self Aid in Dublin. Intended to help alleviate Ireland's unemployment crisis by raising funds and job pledges, the event was harshly criticised in the media for taking pressure off the Irish government to resist Margaret Thatcher's economic policies. The band in particular were labelled hypocrites for their participation. Their appearance included a cover of Bob Dylan's "Maggie's Farm", reinterpreted as a criticism of Thatcher. Hot Press' Niall Stokes called their performance "the blackest and most ferocious set of their entire career". In June 1986, U2 embarked on the six-show Conspiracy of Hope tour for Amnesty International, halting the album's recording sessions for about two months. Rather than distract the band, the tour invigourated their new music and provided extra focus on what they wanted to say. For Clayton, the tour validated the "rawness of content" and their attempts to capture the "bleakness and greed of America under Ronald Reagan". The band used soundchecks on the tour to test out various guitar compositions they had. Meegan believed that U2's time with the other artists on the tour affected their own sound: "Their musical heroes were bleeding into the music and they weren't embarrassed by it, which gave them a lot of space to work in."

On 3 July, the band experienced a tragedy when Greg Carroll, their roadie and Bono's personal assistant, was killed in a motorcycle accident in Dublin. The 26-year-old's death overwhelmed the U2 organisation, and the band travelled to his native New Zealand to attend his traditional Māori funeral; the experience inspired the lyrics to "One Tree Hill". After the funeral, Bono and his wife visited Nicaragua and El Salvador, where they saw firsthand the distress of peasants affected by political conflicts and US military intervention, experiences which formed the basis of the lyrics for "Bullet the Blue Sky" and "Mothers of the Disappeared".

On 1 August 1986, U2 regrouped in Dublin to resume work on the album and begin the recording stage proper. During this more intense phase of the sessions, the group began to work at the Edge's newly purchased house, Melbeach, in seaside Monkstown. Lanois said of Melbeach, "That was less of a rock 'n' roll room but we made it work. I think there were a lot of headaches, isolating people and having to build baffles around the place." The Edge called the house "more sombre" but said it had a "solid unpretentious quality that seemed to hold the energy in". "Mothers of the Disappeared" and "Bullet the Blue Sky" were among the songs that evolved at Melbeach. Lanois said that most of the record was done there, and that it was the preferred location for mixing. Writing and recording alternated between the two houses and Windmill Lane Studios. In late August during Hurricane Charley, U2 were visited at Danesmoate by Robbie Robertson, the former guitarist of the Band. Robertson was in Ireland to complete his self-titled debut solo album that he had begun with Lanois. Together, U2 and Robertson recorded the tracks "Sweet Fire of Love" and "Testimony", both of which appear on Robertson's album.

As the sessions progressed, U2 attempted to record a suitable take of the song "Where the Streets Have No Name", which began as a demo that the Edge had composed by himself. However, the group struggled with the chord and time signature shifts, forcing significant "screwdriver work" to fix a recorded version of the song. Eno estimated approximately 40% of the time spent on The Joshua Tree was dedicated to that song alone. During takes, Lanois used a pointer and a chalkboard to help walk the band through the song's changes. In an attempt to force the group to start anew, Eno intended to "stage an accident" whereby the song's tapes would be erased. According to Flood, engineer Pat McCarthy had to restrain Eno to prevent this from happening. Ultimately, the erasure never occurred. Another aspect of the album that required re-work was Bono's lyrics. He had another set of lyrics for most of the record, but the other group members were dissatisfied with them, forcing rewrites. Lanois said the production team extensively screened Bono's lyrics and offered suggestions, as many lines did not sound as good when sang against a backing track as they did when written down. Bono's revised lyrics were described as "absolutely stunning" by Meegan, who believed that the insecurity Bono felt from having his work critiqued further motivated him.

After a creative spurt in October resulted in new song ideas, Bono proposed that the group release a double album. The Edge said: "There would have been two records, depending on which songs we decided to finish. There was this one album, the 'blues' album that Bono was talking about, and another, much more 'European', which is kind of the way I was led." Eno cautioned the group about pursuing the material, telling the Edge: "I know that any one of these new ideas is good enough to make the record, but we have to draw the line somewhere. If we even consider any of them we'll still be here in three months' time." U2 relented, shelving the new songs to avoid missing their deadline.

Recording for The Joshua Tree largely wrapped up in November 1986. They had around 22 tracks recorded in total to select from and complete. Rough mixes had been created throughout the sessions after each song was recorded to, in Lanois' words, take "snapshots along the way ... because sometimes you go too far". The Edge explained that the arrangement and production of each song was approached individually and that while there was a strong uniform direction, they were prepared to "sacrifice some continuity to get the rewards of following each song to a conclusion".

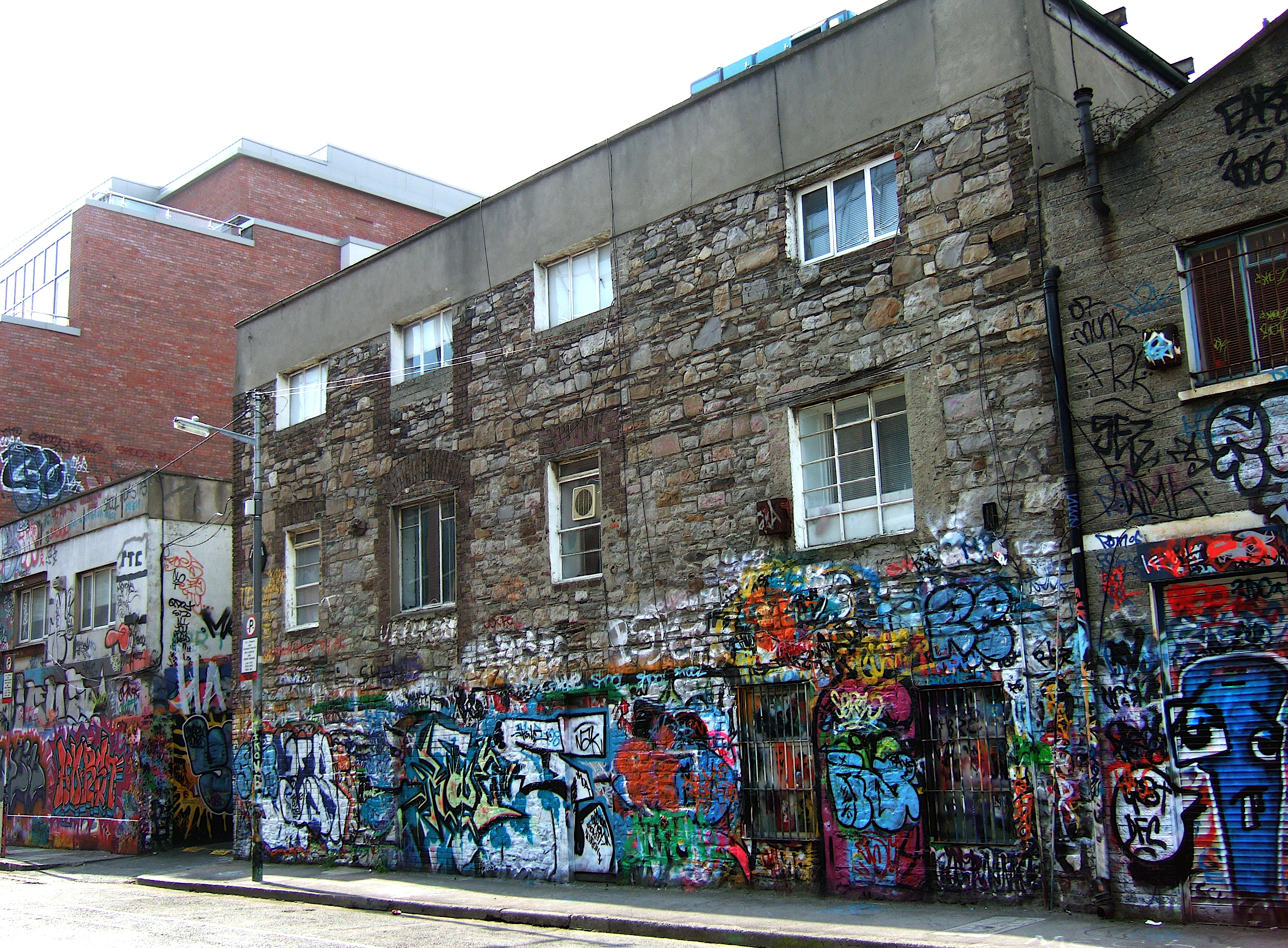
Parts of the album were recorded and mixed at Windmill Lane Studios (pictured in 2008).

The final weeks were a frantic rush to finish, with the band and production crew all suffering from exhaustion. Eno and Flood had minimal involvement with the final mixes, as they had other commitments. Facing understaffing, in late December, U2 hired Steve Lillywhite, producer of their first three albums, to help complete the mixing in time for the deadline. His eleventh-hour presence and changes caused discontent among the production crew, including Eno and Lanois. Of the approximately 30 songs that were created during the album's sessions, 11 were selected for the final track listing. Lillywhite mixed four songs with engineer Mark Wallis on an SSL desk at Windmill Lane Studios. At the same time, Lanois, McCarthy, and Meegan mixed seven songs at Melbeach on a 24-track AMEK 2500 mixing desk; all three were required to operate the console due to the lack of mix automation. Apart from mixing, Wallis noted that the band were still recording last-minute overdubs, including vocals and guitars.

On the night before the 15 January 1987 deadline set by Island Records to complete the record, the band and the crew completed mixing. As they worked at Melbeach, Lillywhite's wife, singer Kirsty MacColl, volunteered to set the running order for the album. The band told her to put "Where the Streets Have No Name" first and "Mothers of the Disappeared" last, with the rest sequenced according to her preference. Bono said of MacColl's contribution, "Your hope for your album is that it will always be greater than the sum of its parts. It wasn't happening for The Joshua Tree and she came in and she organised it and it worked as an old-fashioned album: a beginning, middle and end." Around 2 am, just seven hours before the album was due to Island for mastering, the Edge tried to convince Lillywhite to allow him to add backing vocals to "Where the Streets Have No Name", but he was denied. In the morning, Meegan and Lillywhite flew with the album's tapes to Island's offices in Hammersmith, London.

Following the completion of the album proper, U2 returned to the studio with Meegan and McCarthy to complete the new material they had shelved in October. These tracks, which included "Walk to the Water", "Luminous Times (Hold on to Love)", and "Spanish Eyes", were completed as B-sides for the planned singles. The Edge said that with no producers around and "without the sense of significance that imbued the album sessions", the group worked quickly and productively, preventing the songs from, in his opinion, sounding overworked. The song "Sweetest Thing" was left off the album and released as a B-side, as the band felt it was incomplete and did not fit with the other songs. They later expressed regret that it had not been completed for The Joshua Tree. The track was re-recorded as a single for the group's 1998 compilation The Best of 1980–1990. U2 agreed that one track, "Birdland", was too strong for a B-side and they withheld it for a future album release. In 2007, a re-recorded version of the song, retitled "Wave of Sorrow (Birdland)", was included with the 20th anniversary edition of the album.

After completing The Joshua Tree, Bono said that he was "as pleased with the record as I can ever be pleased with a record", calling it U2's most complete album since their debut. Clayton bought Danesmoate House in 1987 and made it his home.

== Composition ==
=== Music ===
"Where the Streets Have No Name"
Like much of the Edge's guitar playing on the album, the opening riff to "Where the Streets Have No Name", a repeating six-note arpeggio, is modulated with a delay effect.

"I Still Haven't Found What I'm Looking For"
Gospel music influenced "I Still Haven't Found What I'm Looking For". Bono's vocals are in a higher register, and he sings of spiritual doubt.

"Running to Stand Still"
"Running to Stand Still" combines American folk influences with lyrics about a heroin-addicted Irish couple.

U2 is credited with composing all of The Joshua Tree's music. The album's sound draws from American and Irish roots music more than the group's previous albums, following the counsel and influence of Bob Dylan, Van Morrison, and Keith Richards. "I Still Haven't Found What I'm Looking For" has strong gospel influences, with Bono singing of spiritual doubt in an upper register and Eno, Lanois, and the Edge providing choir-like backing vocals. The slow piano-based ballad "Running to Stand Still" exhibits traits of folk music and acoustic blues in the track's slide acoustic guitar and harmonica. "Trip Through Your Wires", another song on which Bono plays harmonica, was described by Niall Stokes as a "bluesy romp". Summarising the stylistic direction, Chicago Tribune journalist Joshua Klein said that the album "showed how U2's obsession with American roots flavored its art-rock". Writing for AllMusic, Stephen Thomas Erlewine said that "U2 have also tempered their textural post-punk with American influences."

The Edge's guitar playing on The Joshua Tree is characteristic of what came to be his trademark sound. His minimalist style sharply contrasted with the emphasis placed on virtuosity and speed by heavy metal in the 1980s. The Edge views musical notes as "expensive", preferring to play as few of them as possible and to instead focus on simpler parts that serve the moods of the songs. Much of this was achieved with a delay effect, contributing to a chiming, echo-laden sound. For example, the riff in the introduction of the opening track "Where the Streets Have No Name" is a repeated six-note arpeggio, with delay used to repeat notes. The riffs to "I Still Haven't Found What I'm Looking For" and "With or Without You" also prominently use delay, with Bono likening the guitar hook from the former track to "chrome bells".

The Edge continued to employ the ambient techniques of guitar playing that he used on The Unforgettable Fire; for "With or Without You", he used a prototype of the Infinite Guitar to add layers of sustained notes, an approach he first took on his 1986 solo album, the Captive soundtrack. On other songs, his guitar playing is more aggressive; "Exit" was described by Colin Hogg as a "decidedly scary... guitar-driven barrage", while Andrew Mueller said the guitar sounds from "Bullet the Blue Sky" evoke images of fighter planes. For the latter song, the Edge drew inspiration from the guitarists Tom Verlaine and John McGeoch, and he developed the harsh, feedback-charged guitar part at Bono's instruction to "put El Salvador through an amplifier", after Bono returned angry from a visit to the war-torn country. Bono also contributed to songwriting on guitar; the Spanish guitar melody in "Mothers of the Disappeared" originated from a song that he wrote in Ethiopia to teach children about basic hygiene.

Much like on past records, Bono exhibits an expressive, open-throated vocal delivery, which many critics described as "passionate". Spin found that the group's exploration of roots music resulted in Bono's style expanding, saying that he "commands the full whisper-to-shout range of blues mannerisms". Bono attributed this maturation to "loosening up", "discover[ing] other voices", and employing more restraint in his singing. His vocals became, in the words of Thom Duffy, more "dynamic" than they had been on previous records. On "Where the Streets Have No Name", his voice varies greatly in its timbre (as writer Mark Butler describes, "he sighs; he moans; he grunts; he exhales audibly; he allows his voice to crack") and its timing by his usage of rubato to slightly offset the sung notes from the beat. For author Susan Fast, "With or Without You" marks the first track on which he "extended his vocal range downward in an appreciable way".

=== Lyrics ===
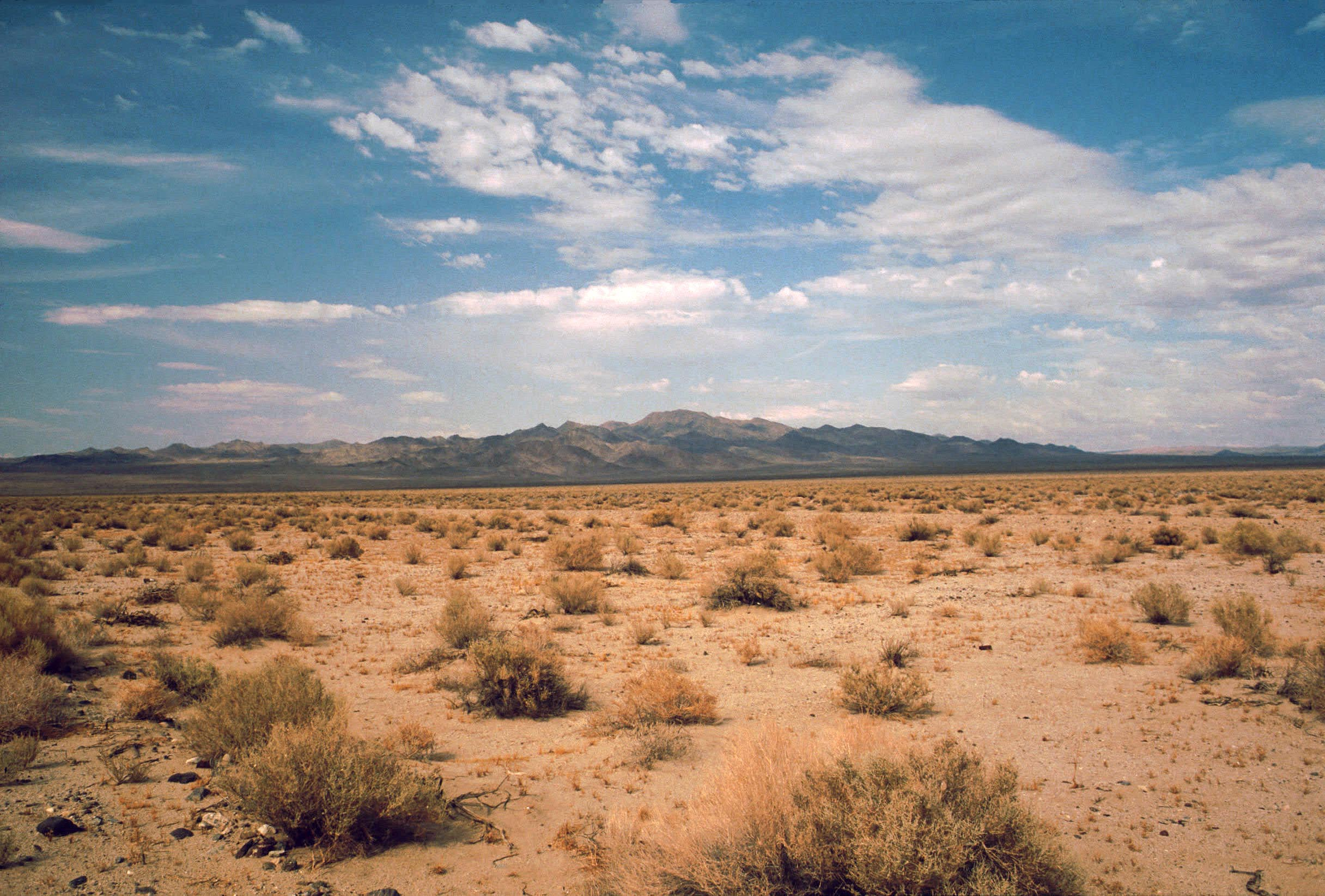
The mental image of an American desert was inspirational to the group during the album's conception.

Bono is credited as the album's sole lyricist. Thematically, the album juxtaposes antipathy towards the United States against the band's deep fascination with the country, its open spaces, freedoms, and ideals. Anger is directed particularly at the perceived greed of the Ronald Reagan administration and its foreign policy in Central America. Bono said, "I started to see two Americas, the mythic America and the real America", hence the album's working title, The Two Americas. Having toured the US extensively in the past, the group were inspired by the country's geography. As such, the desert, rain, dust, and water appear as lyrical motifs throughout the record. In many cases, the desert is used as a metaphor for "spiritual drought". One track that chiefly represents these themes is "In God's Country", which critic Barbara Jaeger interpreted as addressing America's role as the "promised land". Clayton explained the impact of the desert imagery: "The desert was immensely inspirational to us as a mental image for this record. Most people would take the desert on face value and think it's some kind of barren place, which of course is true. But in the right frame of mind, it's also a very positive image, because you can actually do something with blank canvas, which is effectively what the desert is."

"I love being there, I love America, I love the feeling of the wide open spaces, I love the deserts, I love the mountain ranges, I even love the cities. So having fallen in love with America over the years that we've been there on tour, I then had to 'deal with' America and the way it was affecting me, because America's having such an effect on the world at the moment. On this record I had to deal with it on a political level for the first time, if in a subtle way."

— Bono, on the album's thematic inspirations, in 1987

Political and social concerns were the basis for several tracks. Bono wrote the lyrics for "Bullet the Blue Sky" after visiting El Salvador during the Salvadoran Civil War and witnessing how the conflict between rebels and the US-backed government affected local civilians. During the mid-song spoken passage, he talks of a man with a "face red like a rose on a thorn bush", a reference to Reagan. Bono's trip also inspired "Mothers of the Disappeared", after he met members of COMADRES—the Mothers of the Disappeared—a group of women whose children were killed or "disappeared" during the civil war at the hands of the local government. The 1984 UK mining strike inspired the lyrics for "Red Hill Mining Town", which Bono wrote from the perspective of a couple affected by the strike. The story of a heroin-addicted couple was the basis for "Running to Stand Still", which Bono set in the Ballymun Flats residential towers in Dublin near which he was raised. The buildings are referenced in the lyric "I see seven towers / But I only see one way out". For "Where the Streets Have No Name", he wrote the lyrics in response to the idea that, in Belfast, a person's religion and income can be deduced based on the street they live on. "Exit" portrays the thoughts of a psychotic killer, although Clayton suggested that the line "He saw the hands that build could also pull down" is also a jab at the US government's conflicting roles in international relations.

Bono described 1986 as "an incredibly bad year" for him, which was reflected in the lyrics. His marriage was under strain, in part due to the album's long gestation period, the band were criticised by the Irish media for their involvement in Self Aid, and his personal assistant Greg Carroll was killed in a motorcycle accident. Bono said, "That's why the desert attracted me as an image. That year was really a desert for us." "With or Without You" was written while he was struggling to reconcile his wanderlust as a musician with his domestic responsibilities. "One Tree Hill", named after a volcanic peak in Carroll's native New Zealand, describes how Bono felt at Carroll's funeral. The album is dedicated to his memory.

The group's religious faith was a source of inspiration for many lyrics. On "I Still Haven't Found What I'm Looking For", Bono affirms this faith but sings of spiritual doubt ("I believe in Kingdom Come"... "But I still haven't found what I'm looking for"). Some critics surmised that the place Bono is referring to on "Where the Streets Have No Name" is heaven. These two songs were singled out by some critics as demonstrating that the band was on a "spiritual quest". Hot Press editor Niall Stokes and Richard Harrington of The Washington Post interpreted "With or Without You" in both romantic and spiritual manners. Biblical references are made on other songs like "Bullet the Blue Sky" ("Jacob wrestled the angel", images of fire and brimstone) and "In God's Country" ("I stand with the sons of Cain"). Thom Duffy interpreted the album as an exploration of the "uncertainty and pain of a spiritual pilgrimage through a bleak and harsh world".

== Packaging and title ==
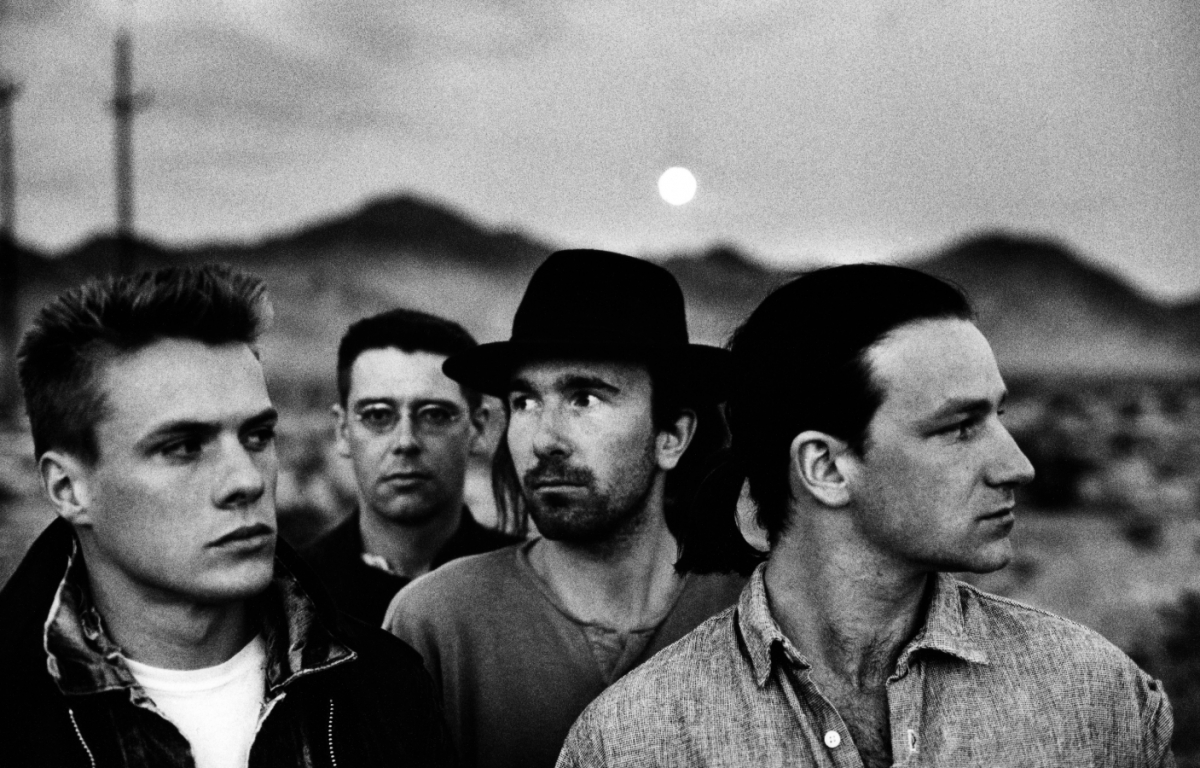
A promotional image of U2, taken by Anton Corbijn in the Mojave Desert during the album's 1986 photo shoot

The album sleeve was designed by Steve Averill, based on U2's request to depict the record's "imagery, and cinematic location" in the desert. Since the album's provisional titles were The Desert Songs and The Two Americas, the initial concept for the sleeve was to represent where the desert met civilisation. The group decided early in the creative process to photograph in the US, contrasting with all of their previous albums, which had been shot in Ireland. They asked their photographer Anton Corbijn to search for locations in the US that would capture their ideas. A week prior to the photo shoot, he travelled to the US to compile a list of locations.

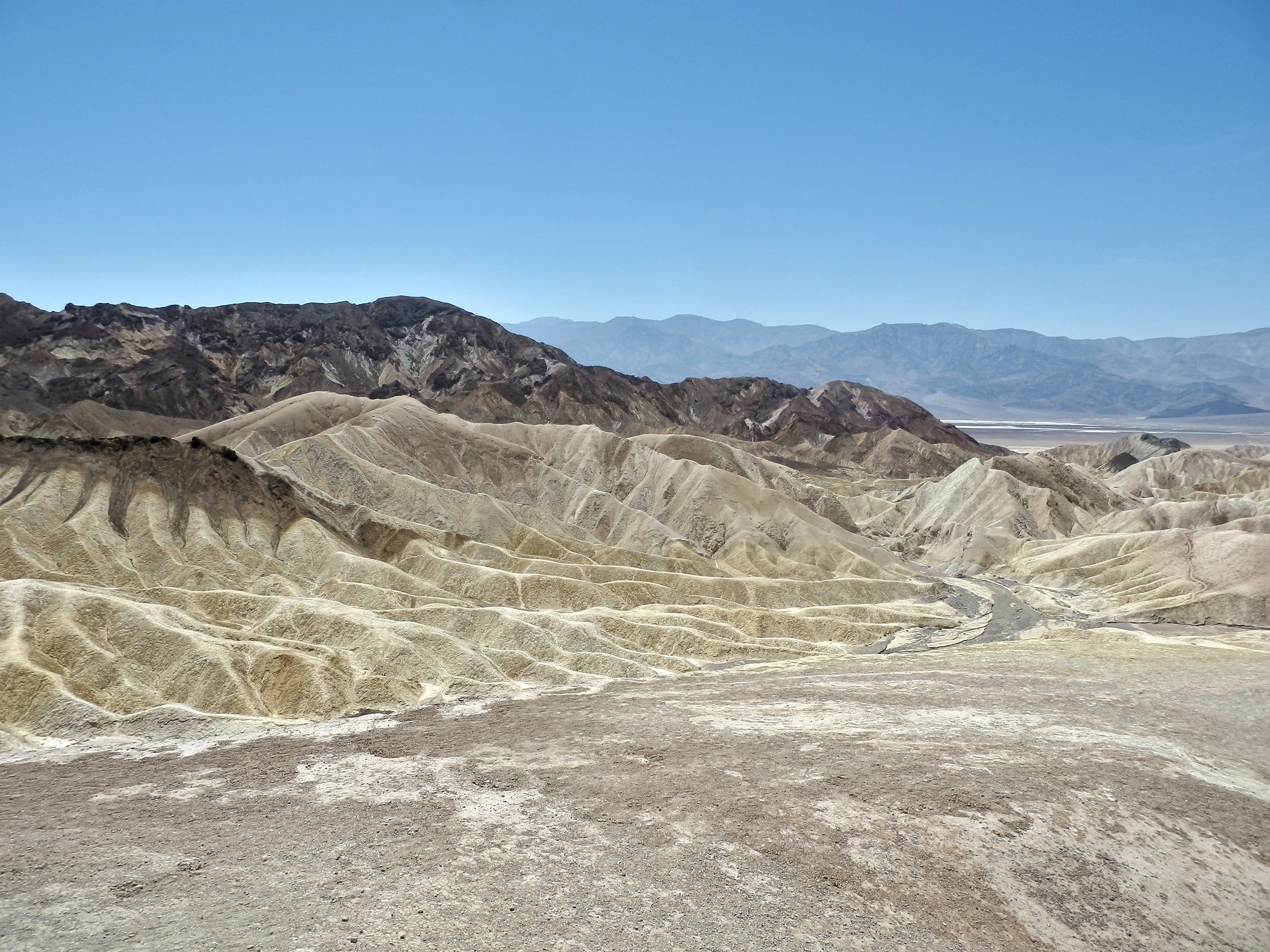
Zabriskie Point, where the cover photograph was shot

Over several days in December 1986, U2 travelled with Corbijn and Averill on a bus around the Mojave Desert for a photo shoot. The group stayed in small hotels and shot in the desert landscape, beginning at Reno, Nevada, before moving to locations in California such as the ghost town of Bodie, the Harmony Motel in Twentynine Palms, Zabriskie Point, Death Valley Junction, and other sites in Death Valley. Corbijn rented a panoramic camera to capture more of the desert landscapes, but having no prior experience with the camera, he was unfamiliar with how to focus it. This led to him focusing on the background and leaving the band slightly out of focus. Corbijn said, "Fortunately there was a lot of light." Averill filmed portions of the trip with an 8 mm film camera. The photo shoots took place in the mornings and evenings, with mid-days spent travelling and on preparation. Corbijn later recounted that the main idea of the shoot was to juxtapose "man and environment, the Irish in America". Averill said of their photographic approach, "What I was trying to do with the way we shot the pictures and framed the cover was to suggest the landscape vision and cinematic approach that was taken to the recording" of the album.

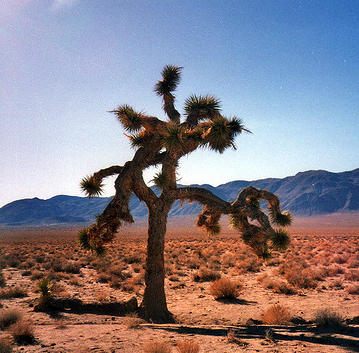
The Joshua tree (Yucca brevifolia) used throughout the album artwork was located in the Mojave Desert near Darwin, California.

On the evening after the first day's shooting, Corbijn told the band about Joshua trees (Yucca brevifolia), hardy and twisted plants in the deserts of the American Southwest, and he suggested their use on the sleeve. Bono was pleased to discover the religious significance of the plant's etymology; according to Mormon legend, early settlers named the plant after the Old Testament prophet Joshua, as the tree's stretching branches reminded them of Joshua raising his hands in prayer. The following day, Bono declared that the album should be titled The Joshua Tree. That morning, while driving on Route 190 near Darwin, they spotted a lone-standing tree in the desert. Corbijn had been hoping to find a single tree, as he thought it would result in better photographs than if he shot the band amongst a group of trees. They stopped the bus and photographed with the lone plant for about 20 minutes, something the Edge called "fairly spontaneous". Despite shooting in the desert, the group dealt with cold weather during parts of the trip. Bono explained, "it was freezing and we had to take our coats off so it would at least look like a desert. That's one of the reasons we look so grim." Regarding the serious tone of the images, Corbijn said, "I guess people felt they took themselves too seriously. It was definitely the most serious, I think, that you can photograph a band. You couldn't go any further down that line unless you start photographing graves."

"The Joshua Tree takes its title from the tree that somehow survives in the desert, and much of its material suggests an attempt, within the aridity, to quench a profoundly spiritual thirst."

— Don McLeese of the Chicago Sun-Times, on the album title as a metaphor for the songs

For the vinyl record release, Corbijn originally wanted to have a shot of the Joshua tree on the front of the sleeve, with U2 in a continuation of the photograph on the back. Averill tried out a concept with just the landscape on the front that he said resembled a "jazz ECM record". Ultimately, separate photographs were used for each side of the sleeve; an image of the group at Zabriskie Point was placed on the front, while an image of them with the tree appears on the back cover. For the front cover, Averill said that the framing of the band in the left half of the photo was meant to evoke the cinematography of film directors John Ford and Sergio Leone. The centre gatefold showed an image of U2 with the Joshua tree in the middle; a mirror used by them to check their appearance was mistakenly left in frame. Since the compact disc was a relatively new format at the time, the creative team decided to experiment with the album cover, selecting different cover images for each format on which the album was released; the original compact disc release used a blurry, distorted photo of the band, while the cassette used a clear, but alternate photo. Later CD reissues used the LP photo. Rolling Stone said that the album's title and the images of the tree befit a record concerned with "resilience in the face of utter social and political desolation, a record steeped in religious imagery". In 1991, the magazine ranked The Joshua Tree at number 97 on its list of the "100 Greatest Album Covers of All Time". Cartoonist Berkeley Breathed created a parody of the album cover for the back of his book Billy and the Boingers Bootleg, released in August 1987.

The tree photographed for the sleeve fell around 2000, yet the site remains a popular tourist attraction for U2 fans. One person inserted a plaque into the ground reading, "Have you found what you're looking for?", in reference to the song "I Still Haven't Found What I'm Looking For". It is a common misconception that the site is within Joshua Tree National Park; in fact, it is more than 200 miles (320 km) away.

== Release ==
Just prior to the release of The Joshua Tree, Bono was stricken with a sudden panic about its quality. He said that he contemplated calling the production plants to order a halt of the record pressing. Island Records spent over $100,000 on store displays advertising the album; president Lou Maglia called it "the most complete merchandising effort ever assembled". The Joshua Tree was released on 9 March 1987, with an initial shipment of 300,000 copies in the US. It was the first new release to be made available on the compact disc, vinyl record, and cassette tape formats on the same date. Record stores in Britain and Ireland opened at midnight to accommodate the large number of fans who had queued outside to buy the album.

"With or Without You" was released as the lead single on 21 March 1987, with the B-sides "Luminous Times (Hold on to Love)" and "Walk to the Water". The single quickly topped the Billboard Hot 100, becoming the band's first number-one hit in America. The song topped the singles chart in Canada, while reaching number four in the UK and number two in the Netherlands. The group originally planned to use "Red Hill Mining Town" as the second single. However, the group were unhappy with the music video filmed by Neil Jordan, and Bono had difficulty singing the song. Ultimately, the group canceled the single. Instead, "I Still Haven't Found What I'm Looking For" was chosen as the second single, and it was released in May 1987 with the tracks "Spanish Eyes" and "Deep in the Heart" as B-sides. Like its predecessor, it topped the Hot 100, giving U2 consecutive number-one singles in the US. The single peaked at number six in the UK, Canada, and the Netherlands.

"Where the Streets Have No Name" was released in August 1987 as the third single, with "Sweetest Thing", "Silver and Gold", and "Race Against Time" as B-sides. The single reached number seven in the Netherlands, number four on the UK Singles Chart, and number 13 in the US. The album's first three singles all topped the Irish Singles Charts, while charting within the top 20 of the singles charts in the UK, the US, Canada, New Zealand, and the Netherlands. "In God's Country" was released as a fourth single exclusively in North America in November 1987, peaking at number 44 on the Hot 100 and number 48 as an import single in the UK. "One Tree Hill" was released as a fourth single in Australia and New Zealand in March 1988, and having been written for the New Zealand-native Carroll, it reached number one in his home country.

In 1996, Mobile Fidelity Sound Lab remastered the album and released it as a special gold CD. This edition rectified the incorrect track splitting between "One Tree Hill" and "Exit" that affected some CD releases; the quiet coda that concludes "One Tree Hill" had previously been included in the same track as "Exit".

Following its 30th anniversary reissue, The Joshua Tree re-entered the Billboard 200 chart the week of 8 June 2017, climbing to number 16—its highest position on the chart since 13 February 1988. That week, it sold 27,000 album-equivalent units, 23,000 of which were sales, making it the album's highest-selling week in the US since 3 January 1993.

== Reception ==
=== Critical reaction ===
1987 reviews
Review scores
Source	Rating
Chicago Sun-Times	4/4 stars
The Cincinnati Post	4.5/5 stars
Houston Chronicle	3.5/5 stars
Los Angeles Times	4/4 stars
The New Zealand Herald	5/5 stars
Orlando Sentinel	5/5 stars
Ottawa Citizen	Excellent
Pittsburgh Post-Gazette	A−
Q	5/5 stars
The Village Voice	B

The Joshua Tree received acclaim and the best reviews of U2's career to that point. Steve Pond of Rolling Stone wrote, "For a band that's always specialized in inspirational, larger-than-life gestures—a band utterly determined to be Important—The Joshua Tree could be the big one, and that's precisely what it sounds like." The review described the album's sound as "wed[ding] the diverse textures of The Unforgettable Fire to fully formed songs, many of them as aggressive as the hits on War". Steve Morse of The Boston Globe echoed these sentiments in his review, stating, "It's another spiritual progress report, enwrapped in music that strikes a healthy balance between the lushness of their last album, 1984's The Unforgettable Fire, and the more volcanic rock of their early years." Morse called it "their most challenging work to date" and the "most rewarding rock record of the new year". John McCready of NME praised the album as "a better and braver record than anything else that's likely to appear in 1987... It's the sound of people still trying, still looking..."

Thom Duffy of the Orlando Sentinel said the songs have "exultant power" that, "like the Joshua Tree's branches, stretch upward in stark contrast to their barren musical surroundings on rock radio". He praised the musicianship of the group members, calling Bono's vocals "wrenching", the rhythm section of Mullen and Clayton "razor-sharp", and the Edge's guitar playing "never... better". Colin Hogg of The New Zealand Herald called The Joshua Tree "the most compelling collection of music yet from a band that has cut its career with passionate, exciting slashes". It judged that the record's "power lies in its restraint" and that there is an "urgency underlying virtually all of the 11 songs". Robin Denselow of The Guardian called the album "epic", saying "what U2 have achieved is an exhilarating and varied blend of controlled power and subtelty". The review praised U2 for maturing and expanding their musical range, yet "retain[ing] their sense of power" and the "brave passion and emotion" of Bono's vocals.

Q's Paul Du Noyer said that the source of The Joshua Tree's "potency lies in a kind of spiritual frustration – a sense of hunger and tension which roams its every track in search of some climactic moment of release, of fulfilment, that never arrives." He concluded his review by writing that the music "has the one thing vital to worthwhile rock, a thing so often absent: the urge to exist". Spin hailed the record as U2's "first wholly successful album because it finally breaks free from the seductive but limiting chant-and-drone approach of earlier material". The review stated, "There isn't a bad song on the record" and that "every one has a hook". The magazine praised U2 for eschewing ambient experimentation in favour of uncomplicated but layered arrangements. Robert Hilburn of the Los Angeles Times said the album "confirms on record what this band has been slowly asserting for three years now on stage: U2 is what the Rolling Stones ceased being years ago—the greatest rock and roll band in the world". Hilburn noted that the band showed "sometimes breathtaking signs of growth" and played more "tailored and assured" music. Hot Press editor and longtime U2 supporter Bill Graham said that "The Joshua Tree rescues rock from its decay, bravely and unashamedly basing itself in the mainstream before very cleverly lifting off into several higher dimensions," and that U2 "must be taken very seriously indeed after this revaluation of rock". John Rockwell of The New York Times was complimentary of the band for expanding its musical range but said Bono's vocals were "marred throughout by sobbing affectation" and sounded too much like other singers, resulting in a "curious loss of individuality". The Houston Chronicle's Marty Racine felt it has "music that both soothes and inspires, music that is anthemic, music with style". Racine, however, believed the group took itself too seriously, resulting in a record that is "not a whole lot of fun, bordering on the pretentious", which caused him to lose interest by the second side. Robert Christgau from The Village Voice found the lyrics tasteful and the music "mournful and passionate, stately and involved", but lamented what he felt was pompous singing by Bono, calling it "one of the worst cases of significance ever to afflict a deserving candidate for superstardom".

Anthony DeCurtis of Rolling Stone compared the album to Bruce Springsteen's Born in the U.S.A., stating that both records "lifted a populist artist to mega-stardom", and that the musicians' uplifting live shows and the "sheer aural pleasure" of the two records obscured their foreboding nature. DeCurtis summarized The Joshua Tree's examination of America both lyrically and musically as such:

"The wild beauty, cultural richness, spiritual vacancy and ferocious violence of America are explored to compelling effect in virtually every aspect of The Joshua Tree—in the title and the cover art, the blues and country borrowings evident in the music ... Indeed, Bono says that 'dismantling the mythology of America' is an important part of The Joshua Tree's artistic objective."

=== Awards and accolades ===
In voting for Rolling Stone's 1987 end-of-year readers' polls, U2 won in the categories Best Album, Artist of the Year, Best Band, Best Single ("With or Without You"), and Best Male Singer (Bono). The album placed fourth on the "Best Albums" list from The Village Voice's 1987 Pazz & Jop critics' poll, and sixth on NME's end-of-year albums list.

At the Juno Awards of 1987, The Joshua Tree was nominated for International Album of the Year. In 1988, U2 received four Grammy Award nominations for the album and its songs, winning honours for Album of the Year (to beat artists such as Michael Jackson, Prince, and Whitney Houston) and Best Rock Performance By a Duo or Group With Vocal for The Joshua Tree. "I Still Haven't Found What I'm Looking For" was nominated for Song of the Year and Record of the Year, but lost in both categories. U2 were the only act that year to be nominated in each of the "Big Three" categories (Record of the Year, Song of the Year, and Album of the Year). U2 won the Brit Award for International Group during the 1988 ceremony. At the American Music Awards of 1988, The Joshua Tree was nominated for Favorite Pop/Rock Album and the band for Favorite Pop/Rock Band/Duo/Group.

== Commercial performance ==
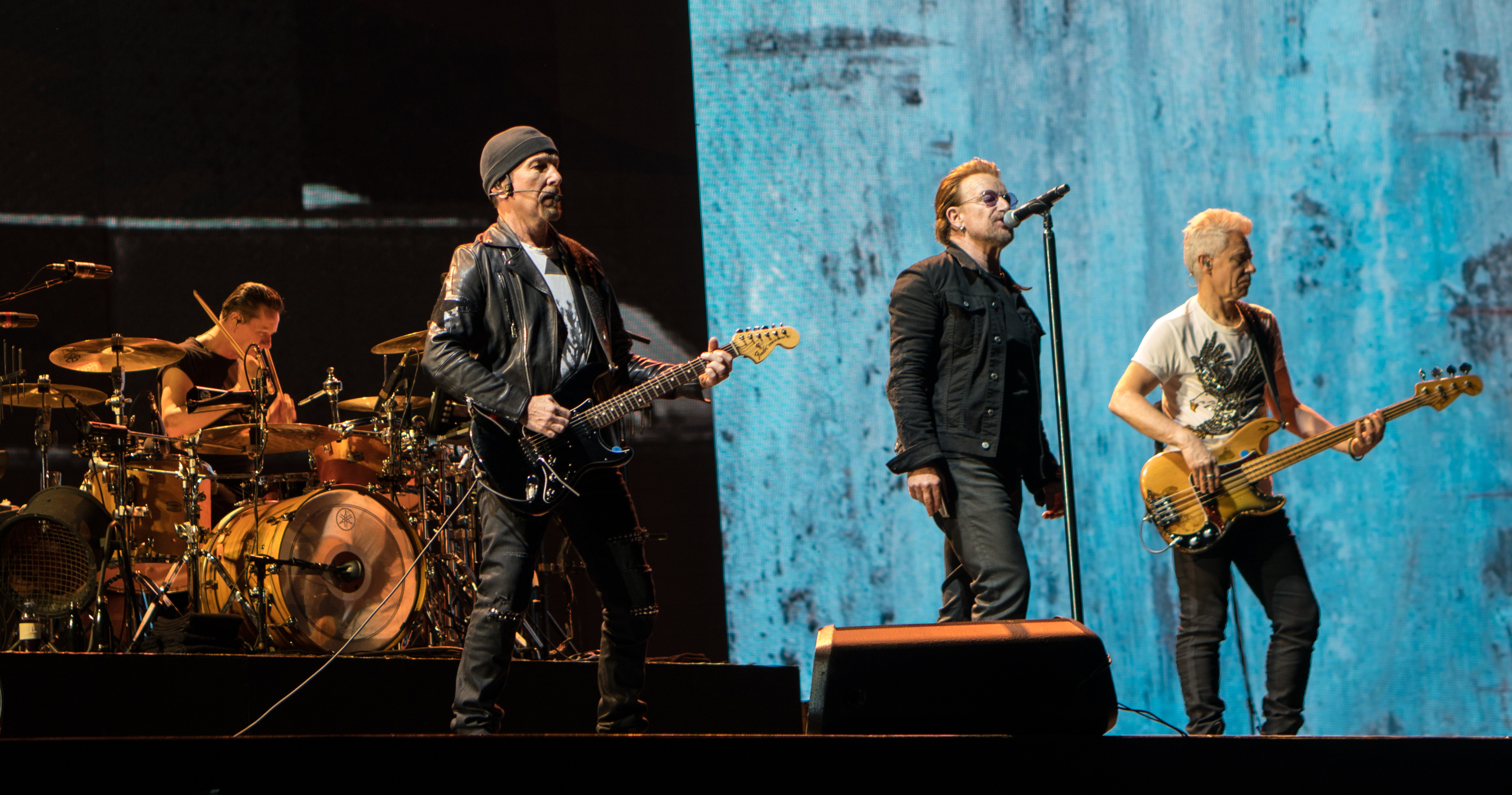
The success of The Joshua Tree brought U2 (pictured in 2017) a new level of stardom internationally.

The Joshua Tree debuted on the UK Albums Chart on 21 March 1987 at number one with 235,000 copies sold in its opening week. It was certified platinum in the UK within 48 hours. The album spent two weeks atop the UK Albums Chart and spent its first 28 weeks within the top ten. In total, it charted in the UK for 201 weeks, ranking it among the longest-charting albums in the nation's history. On the US Billboard Top Pop Albums chart, the album debuted on 4 April 1987 at number seven, the highest debut for a studio album in the US in almost seven years. Three weeks later, it reached number one, becoming the group's first album to top the charts in the US. It remained at that position for nine consecutive weeks, the band's longest number-one reign on the chart and the second-longest reign in the US that year. The album spent a total of 120 weeks on the Billboard Top Pop Albums, 35 of them in the top ten. On 13 May 1987, the Recording Industry Association of America (RIAA) certified the album double-platinum. All of the group's previous albums re-entered the Billboard Top Pop Albums chart in 1987.

In Canada, the album debuted at number 51 on the RPM Top 100 Albums chart on 21 March 1987, and climbed to number one just two weeks later. Within 14 days of release, it sold 300,000 units in Canada and was certified triple-platinum. The Joshua Tree also topped the charts in Austria, Switzerland, New Zealand, and Sweden. In total, the album reached number one in over 20 countries.

By May 1987, sales of the album surpassed 7 million copies worldwide. Rolling Stone said that the album increased the band's stature "from heroes to superstars". It was the first album by any artist to sell one million copies on CD in the US. U2 were featured on the cover of the 27 April 1987 issue of Time, which declared them "Rock's Hottest Ticket"; they were just the fourth rock band to appear on the magazine's cover, following the Beatles, the Band, and the Who. By the end of 1988, The Joshua Tree had sold more than 14 million copies worldwide. It was the ninth-best-selling album in the UK during the 1980s.

The Joshua Tree is the band's highest-selling album, and with 25 million copies sold worldwide, it is among the highest-selling albums of all time. It ranks as one of the best-selling albums in the US; in 1995, the RIAA certified it 10× platinum for shipping 10 million units. Similarly, the Canadian Recording Industry Association certified the album diamond in Canada. In the UK, The Joshua Tree ranked among the 40 highest-selling records as of October 2018, with 2.88 million copies sold, and in 2023 it was certified 10× platinum by the British Phonographic Industry. In the Pacific, it is certified 5× platinum in Australia and 14× platinum in New Zealand.

== The Joshua Tree Tour ==
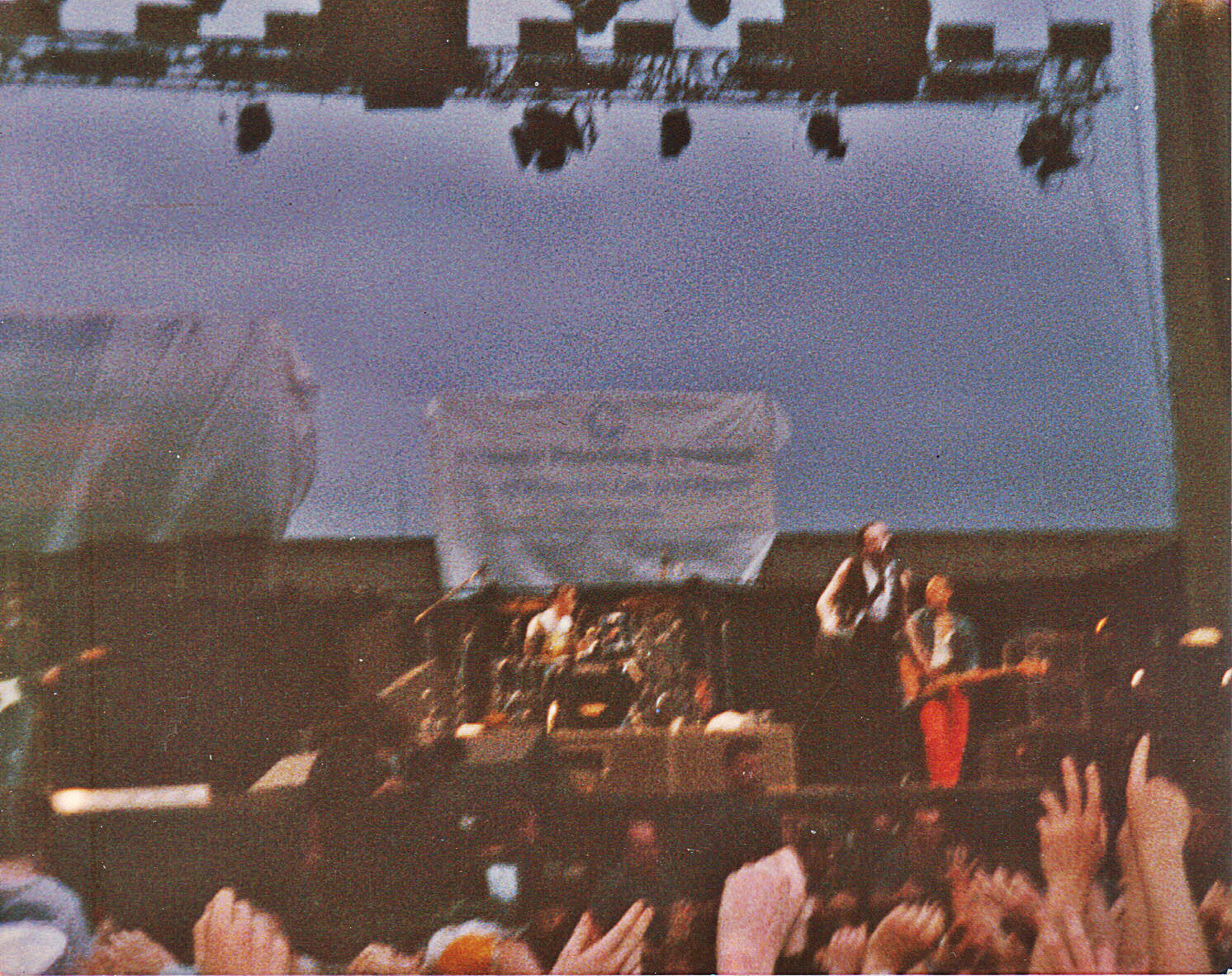
U2 performing on the Joshua Tree Tour in Dublin in June 1987

Following the album's release, U2 embarked on a worldwide concert tour, the Joshua Tree Tour. Lasting from April to December 1987, it comprised 109 shows over three legs. The first and third legs visited the US, while the second leg toured Europe. The Joshua Tree elevated the group to a new level of popularity; the tour sold out arenas and stadiums around the world—the first time they consistently performed at venues of that size. Songs from the album became staples of the tour's set lists, as the group regularly performed eight of the record's eleven tracks, and the only song not to be played was "Red Hill Mining Town".

Like their previous tours, the Joshua Tree Tour was a minimalistic, austere production, and U2 used this outlet for addressing political and social concerns. One such issue was Arizona Governor Evan Mecham's canceling the state's observance of Martin Luther King Jr. Day. Throughout the tour, the group continued to explore American roots music: they collaborated with folk artist Bob Dylan, blues musician B. B. King, and Harlem's New Voices of Freedom gospel choir; U2 also visited Graceland and Sun Studio in Memphis, where they recorded new material. These new songs and the band's experiences on tour were documented for the 1988 Rattle and Hum album and Phil Joanou-directed motion picture.

The Joshua Tree Tour was the highest-grossing North American tour of 1987, grossing $35.1 million from 2.04 million tickets sold to 79 shows. Overall, the tour grossed US$56 million and sold 3.17 million tickets, but despite its commercial success and positive reviews, U2 were dissatisfied creatively, and Bono believed they were musically unprepared for their success. Mullen said, "We were the biggest, but we weren't the best", and for Bono the tour was "one of the worst times of [their] musical life". On the road, the group dealt with death threats, along with injuries that Bono sustained from performing. The band hinted that the stresses of touring led them to enjoy the "rock and roll lifestyle" they previously avoided.

== Legacy ==
Retrospective professional reviews
Review scores
Source	Rating
AllMusic	5/5 stars
Entertainment Weekly	A
Pitchfork	8.9/10

In a retrospective review of The Joshua Tree, Stephen Thomas Erlewine of AllMusic said "their focus has never been clearer, nor has their music been catchier". His review concluded, "Never before have U2's big messages sounded so direct and personal." Entertainment Weekly's Bill Wyman wrote that the album combined "easy-to-grasp themes – alienation and an outsider’s ambivalent view of America – with an extremely focused musical attack". A 2008 retrospective by Q said "their reinvention of stadium rock sounds as impassioned as ever" and that the album strikes "a finely balanced mix of intimacy and power".

"During the two decades that have elapsed since then, every move the band has made has been, in some way, a reaction to the legacy of The Joshua Tree. Rattle and Hum was an extension of the album, further exploring American music forms such as blues, gospel, and soul. Then, inevitably, U2 got tired of living in their own shadow, and both Achtung Baby and Zooropa chipped away at expectations of the band. When they finally realized there was no escaping their iconic status sealed by The Joshua Tree, U2 mocked it on Pop. By then, though, fans had grown weary of the band's experimentation, and U2 have spent their last two albums trying to recapture the radio-friendly sound of their 1987 opus."

— PopMatters, in 2007

The Joshua Tree has been acclaimed by writers and music critics as one of the greatest albums of all time. In 1997, The Guardian collated worldwide data from a range of renowned critics, artists, and radio DJs, who placed the record at number 57 on the list of the "100 Best Albums Ever". It was ranked 25th in Colin Larkin's 2000 book All Time Top 1000 Albums. In a poll of VH1 viewers the following year, The Joshua Tree was voted the greatest pop album of all time, based on responses from over 250,000 people. Rolling Stone ranked the album at number 26 on their 2003 list of "The 500 Greatest Albums of All Time". Subsequent updates to the list re-ranked the album; the 2012 version ranked it 27th, writing that the album "turn[ed] spiritual quests and political struggles into uplifting stadium singalongs", and the 2020 version of the list ranked it 135th. In 2006, Time named The Joshua Tree one of the magazine's 100 best albums, while Hot Press ranked it 11th on a similar list. Q named it the best record of the 1980s, while Entertainment Weekly included the album on its list of the 100 best records released between 1983 and 2008.

In 2010, the album appeared at number 62 on Spin's list of the 125 most influential albums in the 25 years since the magazine launched. The publication said, "The band's fifth album spit out hits like crazy, and they were unusually searching hits, each with a pointed political edge." The same year, Consequence of Sound ranked The Joshua Tree 34th on its list of "The 100 Greatest Albums of All Time", calling it "Arguably the biggest album of the 1980s" and "proof that lightning can be captured in a bottle". In 2012, Slant Magazine ranked it 24th on its list of the "Best Albums of the 1980s", saying that The Joshua Tree's opening trio of songs helped "the band became lords and emperors of anthemic '80s rock" and that "U2 no longer belonged to Dublin, but the world." In 2018, Pitchfork ranked the record 47th on its list of "The 200 Best Albums of the 1980s", writing that the album's "brilliant tension" and continued resonance was the result of Eno and Lanois "steer[ing] U2 toward a moody impressionism where slide guitars and three chord progressions sound cavernous, even ominous". In 2024, Apple Music ranked The Joshua Tree 49th on its 100 Best Albums list.

The Buffalo News said the record "made [U2] the first mainstream band since the Beatles to capture the spirit of the age in a manner that was both populist and artistically, politically and socially incisive", while humanities scholar Henry Vyverberg considered it among the minority of attempts at "serious art" during a decade in which the rock genre largely "remained musical junk-food". From Josh Tyrangiel's perspective, The Joshua Tree began a "towering period" of U2's history lasting through 1993's Zooropa when they "made stadium-size art rock with huge melodies that allowed Bono to throw his arms around the world while bending its ear about social justice". WYMS journalist Mitchell Kreitzman credited it with exposing "alternative music to the masses", and Kevin J. H. Dettmar cited it as the most commercially and critically successful album "yet to emerge from alternative or college rock". In 2014, The Joshua Tree was inducted into the Grammy Hall of Fame for becoming "part of our musical, social, and cultural history". That same year, the album was selected for preservation in the National Recording Registry by the US Library of Congress for being deemed "culturally, historically, or aesthetically significant". It is the only Irish work to be so honoured.

The band's penchant for addressing political and social issues, as well as their staid depiction in Corbijn's black-and-white sleeve photographs, contributed to the group's earnest and serious image as "stone-faced pilgrim[s]". This image became a target for derision after the band's critically maligned Rattle and Hum project in 1988. Various critics called them "po-faced", "pompous bores", and "humourless". The group's continued exploration of American music for the project was labelled "pretentious" and "misguided and bombastic". After Bono told fans on the 1989 Lovetown Tour that U2 would "dream it all up again", the band reinvented themselves in the 1990s. They incorporated alternative rock, electronic dance music, and industrial music into their sound, and adopted a more ironic, flippant image by which they embraced the "rock star" identity they struggled with in the 1980s. Bono referred to their 1991 album Achtung Baby as "the sound of four men chopping down the Joshua Tree". Author Bill Flanagan summarised the impact of The Joshua Tree on the group's career in his liner notes for the album's 20th anniversary release: "The Joshua Tree made U2 into international rock stars and established both a standard they would always have to live up to and an image they would forever try to live down."

== 20th anniversary remastered edition ==
On 20 November 2007, a 20th anniversary edition of The Joshua Tree was released. The album was remastered from the original analogue recordings under the direction of the Edge, with the original vinyl album artwork restored. The release was made available in four formats: a single CD; a two-disc deluxe edition with a bonus audio CD of B-sides, rarities, and demos; a three-disc box set with the bonus audio CD and DVD, photograph prints, and hardcover book; and a double vinyl edition. All editions included liner notes by author Bill Flanagan and previously unseen photographs by Anton Corbijn. Manager Paul McGuinness explained, "There has been continuous demand from U2 fans to have The Joshua Tree properly re-mastered. As always, the band had to make sure it was right, and now it is." Some formats include expanded liner notes from the band members, the production team, and Anton Corbijn. In an otherwise favourable review of the remastered album, Andrew Mueller of Uncut said that "any casual listener who can perceive a meaningful difference between this and the original has i) ears like a bat and/or ii) needs to get out more".

The bonus audio CD contains 14 additional tracks, including the B-sides "Luminous Times (Hold on to Love)", "Walk to the Water", "Spanish Eyes", "Deep in the Heart", "Silver and Gold", "Sweetest Thing", and "Race Against Time". Two versions of "Silver and Gold" are included—U2's version, and the original recording from the Sun City album by Bono, Keith Richards, and others. The edited single version of "Where the Streets Have No Name" appears on the bonus CD. "Beautiful Ghost/Introduction to Songs of Experience" contains lyrics from the introduction to William Blake's Songs of Experience, while "Drunk Chicken/America" contains an excerpt of Allen Ginsberg's recitation of his poem, "America". "Wave of Sorrow (Birdland)", "Desert of Our Love", "Rise Up", and "Drunk Chicken/America" are all previously unreleased recordings from The Joshua Tree sessions.

The bonus DVD includes live concert footage, a documentary, and two music videos. The disc includes Live from Paris, an 85-minute concert from 4 July 1987 that was originally broadcast on British television in celebration of the 25th anniversary of Island Records. The documentary, titled Outside It's America, was a 1987 MTV production about The Joshua Tree Tour. The two music videos are an alternate version "With or Without You" and the previously unreleased video for "Red Hill Mining Town". Footage of U2's alter ego country band, the Dalton Brothers, is included on the disc as an Easter egg.

== 30th anniversary tour and reissue ==
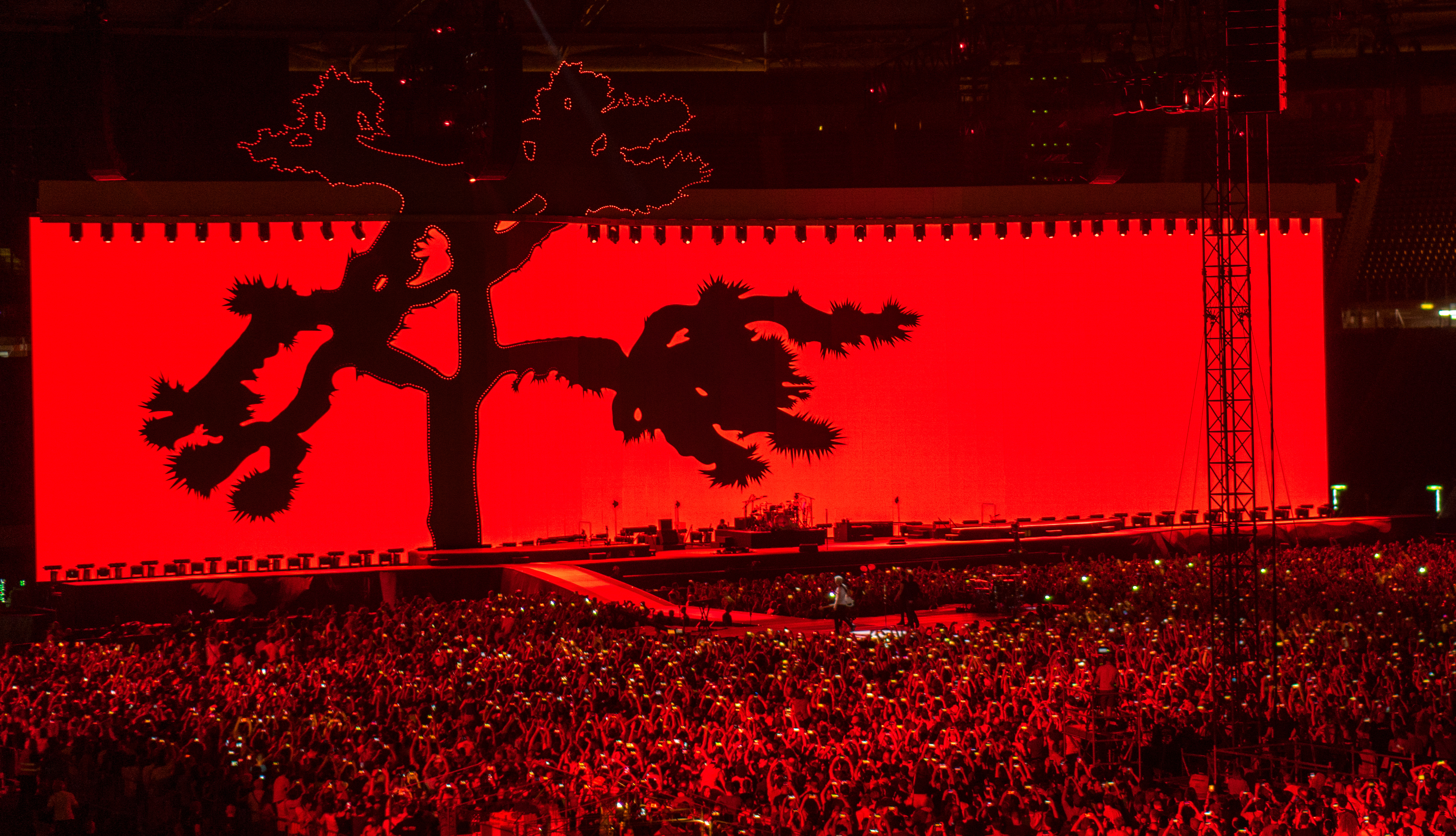
U2 performing in Rome in July 2017, during a concert tour commemorating the 30th anniversary of The Joshua Tree

For the 30th anniversary of The Joshua Tree, U2 staged a 2017 concert tour in North America, Europe, and Latin America, on which they played the album in its entirety at each show. It was the first time the group toured in promotion of an album from their back catalogue, rather than a new release. As part of the tour, U2 headlined the Bonnaroo Music Festival in Manchester, Tennessee, in June. In rationalising the tour, the Edge cited the 2016 US presidential election and other world events for what he judged to be renewed resonance of The Joshua Tree's subject matter: "That record was written in the mid-Eighties, during the Reagan–Thatcher era of British and U.S. politics. It was a period when there was a lot of unrest. Thatcher was in the throes of trying to put down the miners' strike; there was all kinds of shenanigans going on in Central America. It feels like we're right back there in a way... It just felt like, 'Wow, these songs have a new meaning and a new resonance today that they didn't have three years ago, four years ago.'" The 2017 tour grossed more than $316 million from over 2.7 million tickets sold, making it the highest-grossing tour of the year. Additional tour dates were added for Oceania and Asia in 2019, which included the band's first ever performances in South Korea, Singapore, India, and the Philippines. The 2019 shows grossed $73.8 million and sold 567,000 tickets, bringing the cumulative totals for the group's Joshua Tree anniversary tours to $390.8 million grossed and 3.3 million tickets sold.

On 2 June 2017, the album was reissued in several formats in commemoration of its 30th anniversary. Standard editions of the album were released on CD, vinyl record, and via digital download. Deluxe editions, available on CD and digitally, include a concert recording of a 1987 show at Madison Square Garden from the Joshua Tree Tour. In addition to the concert, the super deluxe editions, available on CD, vinyl record, and digitally, include: B-sides and rarities; and remixes of the album's songs made in 2017 by Daniel Lanois, St Francis Hotel, Jacknife Lee, Steve Lillywhite, and Flood. The physical copies of the super deluxe edition include eight folio prints and an 84-page book of photography shot by the Edge during the album cover's 1986 photoshoot in the Mojave Desert. The 2017 remix of "Red Hill Mining Town" was released as a single on vinyl picture disc for Record Store Day in April 2017.

== Track listing ==
All lyrics are written by Bono; all music is composed by U2.

Side one
No.	Title	Length
1.	"Where the Streets Have No Name"	5:38
2.	"I Still Haven't Found What I'm Looking For"	4:38
3.	"With or Without You"	4:56
4.	"Bullet the Blue Sky"	4:32
5.	"Running to Stand Still"	4:18

Side two
No.	Title	Length
1.	"Red Hill Mining Town"	4:52
2.	"In God's Country"	2:57
3.	"Trip Through Your Wires"	3:33
4.	"One Tree Hill"	5:23
5.	"Exit"	4:13
6.	"Mothers of the Disappeared"	5:12
Total length:		50:11

== Personnel ==
Personnel taken from The Joshua Tree liner notes, except where noted. (Note: The band members' instruments are not credited on the album's liner notes, aside from the Edge's backing vocals and Bono's harmonica. Their primary instruments are listed based on their accounts of the album's recording and their de facto primary roles in the group.)

U2

- Bono – vocals, harmonica
- The Edge – guitars, backing vocals, piano ("Running to Stand Still")
- Adam Clayton – bass guitar
- Larry Mullen Jr. – drums

Additional performers

- Brian Eno – keyboards, DX7 programming, backing vocals
- Daniel Lanois – tambourine, Omnichord, additional guitar, backing vocals
- The Armin Family – ("One Tree Hill")
  - Dick Armin – RAAD electric cello
  - Paul Armin – RAAD electric viola
  - Adele Armin – RAAD electric violin
- The Arklow Silver Band – brass ("Red Hill Mining Town")
- Paul Barrett – brass arrangement and conducting

Technical

- Daniel Lanois – production
- Brian Eno – production
- Flood – recording
- Dave Meegan – additional engineering
- Pat McCarthy – additional engineering
- Steve Lillywhite – mixing ("Where the Streets Have No Name", "With or Without You", "Bullet the Blue Sky", "Red Hill Mining Town")
- Mark Wallis – mix engineering
- Mary Kettle – assistant mix engineering
- Bob Doidge – string recording ("One Tree Hill")
- Joe O'Herlihy – studio crew
- Des Broadberry – studio crew
- Tom Mullally – studio crew
- Tim Buckley – studio crew
- Marc Coleman – studio crew
- Mary Gough – studio crew
- Marion Smyth – studio crew
- Kirsty MacColl – album track sequencing
- Anton Corbijn – photography
- Steve Averill – design, layout

== Charts ==
=== Weekly charts ===
The Joshua Tree
Chart (1987–2017)	Peak position
Australian Albums (Kent Music Report)	3
Austrian Albums (Ö3 Austria)	1
Canada Top Albums/CDs (RPM)	1
Danish Albums (Hitlisten)	39
Dutch Albums (Album Top 100)	1
French Albums (SNEP)	23
German Albums (Offizielle Top 100)	1
Irish Albums (IRMA)	2
Italian Albums (FIMI)	7
New Zealand Albums (RMNZ)	1
Norwegian Albums (VG-lista)	4
Portuguese Albums (AFP)	6
Spanish Albums (AFYVE)	3
Swedish Albums (Sverigetopplistan)	1
Swiss Albums (Schweizer Hitparade)	1
UK Albums (Official Charts)	1
US Billboard 200	1

The Joshua Tree (30th Anniversary)
Chart (2017)	Peak position
Belgian Albums (Ultratop Flanders)	8
Belgian Albums (Ultratop Wallonia)	6
Canadian Albums (Billboard)	20
Hungarian Albums (MAHASZ)	36
Polish Albums (ZPAV)	21
US Top Rock Albums (Billboard)	5

=== Year-end charts ===
The Joshua Tree
Chart (1987)	Position
Australian Albums Chart	5
Austrian Top 30 Albums	1
Canada Top Albums/CDs (RPM)	1
European (European Top 100 Albums)	2
German Top 100 Albums	1
New Zealand Albums (RMNZ)	1
Swiss Albums (Schweizer Hitparade)	1
UK Albums (OCC)	2
US Billboard Top Pop Albums	6

Chart (1988)	Position
Canada Top Albums/CDs (RPM)	47
New Zealand Albums (RMNZ)	4

Chart (2001)	Position
UK Albums (OCC)	115

Chart (2017)	Position
Italian Albums (FIMI)	100
US Top Rock Albums (Billboard)	53

The Joshua Tree (30th Anniversary)
Chart (2017)	Position
Belgian Albums (Ultratop Flanders)	97
Belgian Albums (Ultratop Wallonia)	141
Spanish Albums (PROMUSICAE)	78

=== Decade-end charts ===
Chart (1980–89)	Position
UK Albums (OCC)	10

== Certifications and sales ==
Region	Certification	Certified units/sales
Argentina (CAPIF)	Platinum	60,000^{^}
Australia (ARIA)	5× Platinum	350,000^{^}
Austria (IFPI Austria)	3× Gold	75,000^{*}
Brazil	—	180,000
Canada (Music Canada)	Diamond	1,000,000^{^}
Denmark (IFPI Danmark)	Platinum	80,000^{^}
Denmark (IFPI Danmark) Digital	3× Platinum	60,000^{‡}
Finland (Musiikkituottajat)	Gold	27,965
France (SNEP)	2× Platinum	600,000^{*}
Germany (BVMI)	2× Platinum	1,000,000^{^}
Hong Kong (IFPI Hong Kong)	Platinum	20,000^{*}
Italy 1987 sales	—	300,000
Italy (FIMI) sales since 2009	2× Platinum	100,000^{‡}
Mexico (AMPROFON)	Gold	100,000^{^}
Netherlands (NVPI)	Platinum	100,000^{^}
New Zealand (RMNZ)	14× Platinum	210,000^{^}
Norway (IFPI Norway)	Gold	25,000^{*}
Spain (Promusicae)	3× Platinum	300,000^{^}
Sweden (GLF)	Platinum	100,000^{^}
Switzerland (IFPI Switzerland)	Platinum	50,000^{^}
United Kingdom (BPI)	10× Platinum	3,000,000^{‡}
United Kingdom (BPI) Deluxe Edition	Gold	100,000^{*}
United States (RIAA)	Diamond	10,000,000^{^}
^{*} Sales figures based on certification alone.^{^} Shipments figures based on certification alone.^{‡} Sales+streaming figures based on certification alone.

== See also ==
- List of best-selling albums in New Zealand
