= Brehon's Chair =

Megalithic site remnant in Rathfarnham, County Dublin

Coordinates: 53.267832°N 6.264777°W

Brehon's Chair

Brehon's Chair, sometimes Druid's Chair, is a megalithic site, and national monument, in Rathfarnham, Dún Laoghaire–Rathdown, County Dublin, Ireland.

== Etymology ==
The name Brehon's Chair refers to a Victorian idea that the monument was a seat of judgement used by a Brehon (an Anglicisation of breitheamh (earlier brithem), the Irish word for a judge) to administer the Brehon Laws that governed everyday life and politics in Ireland, until the Norman invasion of 1171 and in places until much later. The laws were written in the Old Irish period (ca. 600 – 900 AD) and probably reflect the traditional laws of pre-Christian Ireland. These secular laws continued to exist in parallel with, and sometimes in conflict with, Canon law, throughout the early Christian period. Druid's Chair reflects similar ideas with regard to a Celtic religious aspect. These ideas are not historically accurate, the monument actually dating from prehistoric times, between 500 and 2500 BCE.

== Location ==
The monument is located in the townland of Taylorsgrange, and is sometimes known as the Taylor's Grange Dolmen. It is situated on a green within a gated housing development on the Kellystown Road, in southern Rathfarnham, overlooking Dublin's M50 orbital motorway. Beyond is College Road, and to the south is Danesmoate House and its residual demesne, owned by Adam Clayton of U2. The site is passed by the Little Dargle River, a tributary of the River Dodder.

== Structure and history ==
The monument comprises three granite stones, now roughly in the shape of a chair. When the ground around the monument was excavated, flint tools were among the artefacts found there. As noted above, this stone structure is often mis-described as having been a chair, or a druidic site. However, excavation and study has found it to be what remains of a passage tomb, similar, on a small scale, to that of Newgrange and the other Boyne Valley monuments, and also other historical sites in the Dublin Mountains, such as at Mount Venus. The two side or portal stones, 2.35 m (7.7 ft) and 2.7 m (8.9 ft) high, formed a basic door frame with the third, rear, stone being the door stone. There would probably have been a substantial cairn built up behind the major stones. When originally built, the tomb may once have been a place of spiritual and ceremonial, and possibly astrological, importance.

The monument was within the demesne lands of Glynsouthwell or Glen Southwell, now known as Danesmoate House.

=== Modern development ===
Planning permission for 48 houses south of the monument site was granted in the 1980s, and under a newer permission, two groups of detached houses, within a gated compound, were built southwest and southeast of the monument in 1998. In connection with these explorations of housing potential, archaeological investigations were undertaken in the 1989/1990 season. Following years of discussion and dispute, a final planning decision by An Bord Pleanála in 2018 allowed for the construction of 5 more houses some distance south of the monument, subject to a number of conditions. However, in 2021 the constructed development remains unoccupied and this 'final planning decision' has been superseded by a new planning application to Dun Laoghaire Rathdown County Council. The lands further south are barred to development, and all applications have avoided impinging on the monument's immediate vicinity, including the area between it and the motorway.
