= Danesmoate House =

Georgian house in County Dublin, Ireland

Coordinates: 53.26523°N 6.262449°W

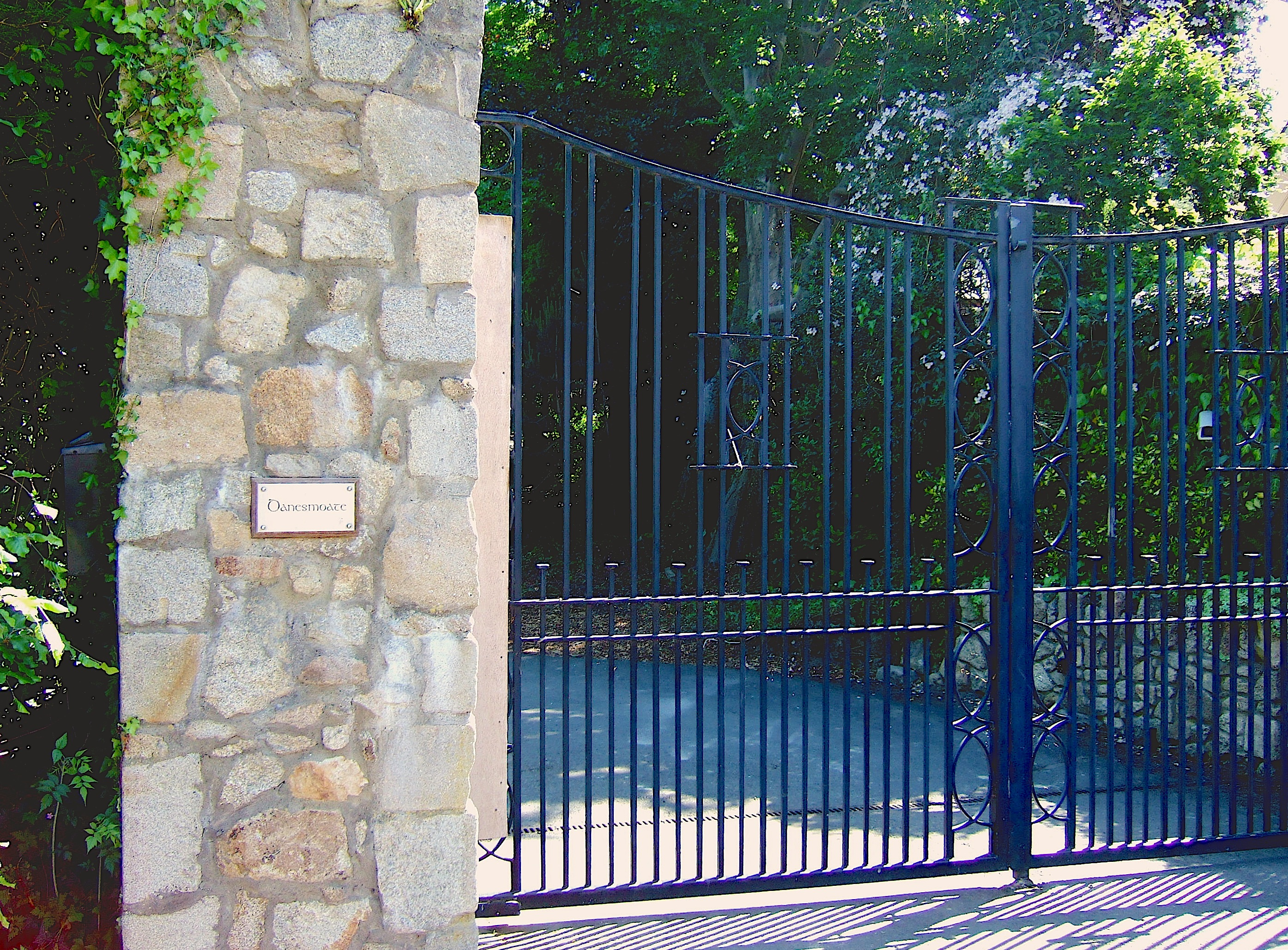
The front gate of the house

Danesmoate House (formerly known as Glensouthwell or Glen Southwell) is a Georgian house in Rathfarnham, Dublin 16, Ireland.

== Location ==
Grange Road continues for nearly a mile to skirt the boundary wall of Marlay Park as far as the crossroads at Taylors Grange. On the right side of Kellystown Road is the entrance to Danesmoate House. The Little Dargle River, a tributary of the River Dodder, rises near the Ticknock rifle range.

== History ==
The house was built in the 18th century by the Southwell family, and in 1787 was the residence of Irish politician and soldier William Southwell.

Throughout the following century it was occupied by the Ponsonbys, down to 1896 and later by Professor Stanley Lane-Poole, the author of a number of works on Oriental art and numismatics. For many years down to 1946 it was the home of Lieutenant Algernon Gainsford of the Seaforth Highlanders.

In 1986, the house was the site of recording by rock band U2 for their album The Joshua Tree. Bassist Adam Clayton purchased the house in 1988. Clayton built a small watchtower beside the 20-room mansion, based on Cruagh Tower in nearby Rockbrook.

== Features ==
=== Brehon's Chair ===
Within the grounds, is an ancient monument known as Brehon's Chair, consisting of three tall slabs about nine feet high enclosing a small square space. There was formerly another large slab supported by smaller ones lying to the north east but this was destroyed about 1876 by blasting. The existing remains are apparently the portal portion of a dolmen type of tomb and the stones which were removed would have been part of the destroyed chamber. A similar type of portal can be seen on a dolmen at Haroldstown in Tullow, County Carlow.

=== Constructions ===
Beside the Little Dargle is the remains of a tall narrow tower of which only one wall is now standing. This building was about nine feet square and the remaining wall with its battlements is about twenty five feet high. One jamb of a doorway with a pointed arch remains. A little over a hundred years ago this tower was in much better preservation and was surrounded by the old walls of other buildings from which it has been suggested that this was the site of the original Grange of the Harolds. The existing portion however is of very light construction and quite unsuitable for a building of that period and location, whether intended for domestic or ecclesiastical use. It was probably built in the eighteenth century for the better enjoyment of the view over Dublin Bay. Beside the house is an octagonal building with a cellar underneath. It is now filled up with boughs and brushwood to prevent cattle falling through but is said to be elliptical in shape and was apparently an ice house. On the other side of the brook there is a fine arched gateway in cut stone leading into the pasture land.
