= Steve Averill =

- Born: 1950 (age 75–76); Ireland
- Occupations: graphic artist; art director; writer; musician; vocalist

Steve Averill (born 1950) is an Irish graphic artist, art director, writer, musician, and former punk rock vocalist. He, along with his company, AMP Visual (previously Four5One Creative), has designed all the album covers for the Irish band U2. Averill also brainstormed the name "U2" that the group selected for themselves.

== Life ==
Averill was educated at Mountjoy and Marine school, which became Mount Temple School in Clontarf, Dublin. His parents thought his interest in musical acts such as the Tornados, the Beatles, the Rolling Stones and the Shadows were all just noise. Even at the age of twelve, he was interested in the album cover art.

Averill had a short career as the singer Steve Rapid in Ireland's first punk band the Radiators from Space who were not very highly thought of by the musical establishment. The Radiators developed from Averill's involvement with Pete Holidai in two earlier bands: Greta Garbage and the Trashcans. Averill remained with the band from their inception in September 1976 until August 1977 when the other members moved to London. His last gig (during this period of the Radiators) was at Ireland's first outdoor rock concert in Dalymount Park on 21 August with Thin Lizzy.

He designed the Radiator's first single cover that helped them secure a record deal with Chiswick Records.

Averill realized his vocal limitations and wanted to express himself through art and design. He considered himself "a tone-deaf singer with no musical talent", so he returned to his graphic designer job at a Dublin advertising company Arrow Publishing and after their demise worked at The Creative Department.

== U2 connection ==
It was Averill who suggested U2 as the name of the Irish group then known as "The Hype".

After working at Helmes Advertising agency Averill would leave to start Averill Brophy Associates and later Four5One Creative, which before he left changed their name to AMP Creative. During his design career, he worked for several of Ireland's musical acts, such as, The Dubliners, Hothouse Flowers, Aslan and Clannad; and international acts like Elvis Costello and Depeche Mode.

Published to coincide with the February 2003 opening of the Rock and Roll Hall of Fame's U2 exhibition In The Name Of Love, a book Stealing Hearts At A Travelling Show shows collaborations with U2 in the design work by Averill and Shaughn McGrath from 1980 to 2003.

== Influences ==
In September 2016, Averill referenced the artist Russell Mills as a source of current inspiration for the web project Just Six Degrees. "I have long been aware and an admirer of the work of Russell Mills. From his early work with Brian Eno - both the album cover designs as well as their book More Dark Than Shark - through to his gallery installations and his work with Nine Inch Nails. So it was a pleasure to meet him in person when we shared a stage at the recent Offset event in Dublin. The real inspiration came from meeting and talking to Russell and being able to hear him talk about the ideas and thought processes behind his work and to then see some of his work close up at the accompanying exhibition. But it was from the man himself and his attitude to his work and life that I drew some personal motivation."
