= U2 concert in Sarajevo =

1997 U2 concert in Sarajevo, Bosnia and Herzegovina

- Concert by U2
- Sarajevo concert poster
- Location: Sarajevo, Bosnia and Herzegovina
- Venue: Koševo Stadium
- Tour: PopMart Tour
- Associated album: Pop
- Date: 23 September 1997
- Supporting acts: Gazi Husrev-beg choir, Protest, Sikter, Howie B
- Attendance: 45,000

U2 concert chronology
- Reggio Emilia (20 Sept 1997); Sarajevo (23 Sept 1997); Thessaloniki (26 Sept 1997)

On 23 September 1997, Irish rock band U2 performed at Koševo Stadium in Sarajevo, Bosnia and Herzegovina, as part of the group's PopMart Tour. They were the first major artist to hold a concert in the city since the end of the Bosnian War in 1995. Approximately 45,000 people attended the show.

The band first became involved with Sarajevo in 1993 on their Zoo TV Tour. After being approached by aid worker Bill Carter about bringing attention to the Siege of Sarajevo, the band began conducting nightly satellite transmissions with Bosnians during their shows. These link-ups were the subject of criticism from journalists for mixing entertainment with human tragedy. Although the war made it impractical for U2 to visit Sarajevo at the time, they vowed to eventually play a concert in the city. After the conflict ended in November 1995, they made arrangements to visit Sarajevo, and with help from United Nations ambassadors and peacekeeping troops, they scheduled and played the concert in 1997.

The band offered to hold a benefit concert or a small show in Sarajevo, but it was requested that they stage a full PopMart concert. The performance featured the tour's extravagant stage, and the band played a set list typical of the tour. The show brought together people of different ethnicities who had previously clashed during the war, and train service was temporarily resumed to allow concertgoers to attend. Among the songs played was "Miss Sarajevo", written by U2 and Brian Eno about a beauty pageant held during the war. Although the band were displeased with their performance and lead vocalist Bono had vocal difficulties, the concert was well received, particularly by Bosnians, and was credited with improving morale among them. The members of U2 consider the show to be among their proudest moments. The band's involvement with Sarajevo and their 1997 performance there were profiled in the 2023 documentary film Kiss the Future.

== Background ==
=== War in Sarajevo ===
The Socialist Federal Republic of Yugoslavia was composed of six constituent republics: Bosnia and Herzegovina, Croatia, Macedonia, Montenegro, Serbia, and Slovenia. In 1991, Croatia, and Slovenia seceded from Yugoslavia. Bosnia and Herzegovina — a republic with a mixed population consisting of Bosniaks, Serbs, and Croats—followed suit in March 1992 in a highly controversial referendum, creating tension in the ethnic communities. Bosnian Serb militias, whose strategic goal was to secede from Bosnia and Herzegovina and unite with Serbia, encircled Sarajevo with a siege force of 18,000 stationed in the surrounding hills, from which they assaulted the city with weapons that included artillery, mortars, tanks, anti-aircraft guns, heavy machine-guns, rocket launchers, and aircraft bombs. From 2 May 1992 until the end of the war in 1996, the city was blockaded. The Army of the Republic of Bosnia and Herzegovina, numbering roughly 40,000 inside the besieged city, was poorly equipped and unable to break the siege. Meanwhile, throughout the country, thousands of predominantly Bosniak civilians were driven from their homes in a process of ethnic cleansing. In Sarajevo, women and children attempting to buy food were frequently terrorized by Bosnian Serb sniper fire.

=== U2's reaction ===
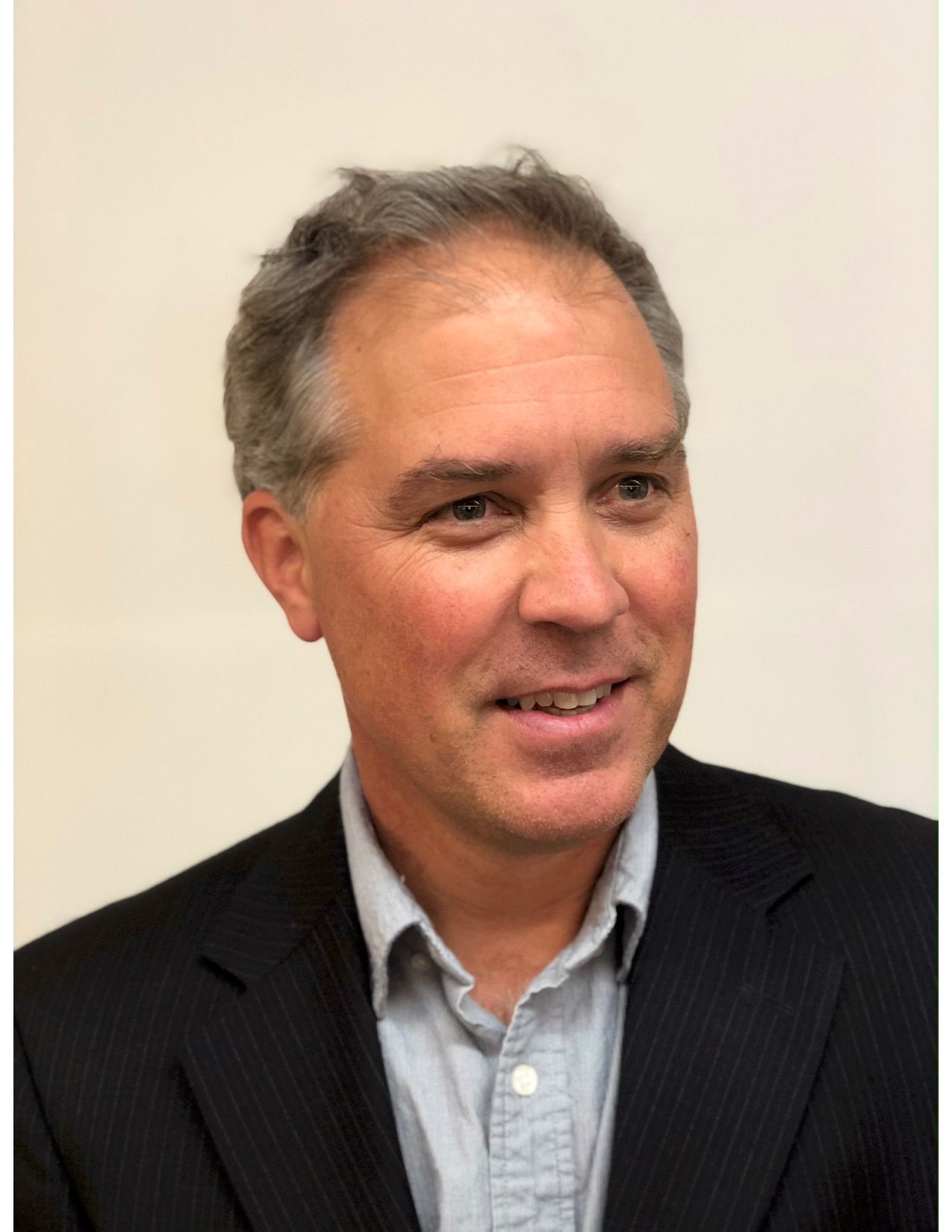
While working as an aid worker, Bill Carter attracted U2's attention to the Siege of Sarajevo.

In 1993, U2 were in Europe for the "Zooropa" leg of their Zoo TV Tour. Before their 3 July show in Verona, Italy, the band received a fax from Radio and Television of Bosnia and Herzegovina asking for an interview regarding the situation in Bosnia. The band agreed and met with an American aid worker named Bill Carter, who acted as the station's foreign associate, due to Serbian travel restrictions. Carter described his experiences in Sarajevo helping Bosnians while surviving the dangerous living conditions. Lead vocalist Bono was unnerved to hear that those living in makeshift bomb shelters in the city played music, including U2's, at loud volumes to drown out the sound of explosions. While in Sarajevo, Carter had seen a television interview on MTV in which Bono mentioned the theme of the Zooropa tour leg was a unified Europe. Carter felt that vision would be unfulfilled if the Bosnians' plight went ignored and thus sought Bono's help. He requested that U2 go to Sarajevo to bring attention to the war and break the "media fatigue" that had occurred from covering the conflict.

"The audience if anything would realize 'Jesus, lucky I'm here enjoying this concert and not in Sarajevo.' Maybe they will think about not letting it happen in their country, their city..."

—Bill Carter, discussing the rationale behind the Zoo TV Tour's satellite link-ups to Sarajevo

Bono agreed to Carter's request without asking the rest of the band, and when informed of the idea, the other members gave only tacit approval. They briefly considered playing an impromptu concert in the city, with Bono suggesting that they perform in the bunker where Carter and his friends hid during the siege. He said, "even if all we get is some extra attention for Bosnia on MTV, that's something". The idea fell through when it was pointed out that the logistics of transporting their equipment into the city were impossible, as the only way into Sarajevo was on a United Nations plane. Manager Paul McGuinness realized that even if the band managed to organize a concert, it would endanger their lives and those of the audience and the Zoo TV crew. As he explained, "U2's effort to discuss any humanitarian issue have sometimes been accompanied by a false instinct that U2 is also obliged to resolve that issue. Going to Sarajevo seems to me to fall into that category. I think it would endanger the people we go with, endanger the tour, and endanger the band." Drummer Larry Mullen, Jr. feared that the move would look like a publicity stunt.

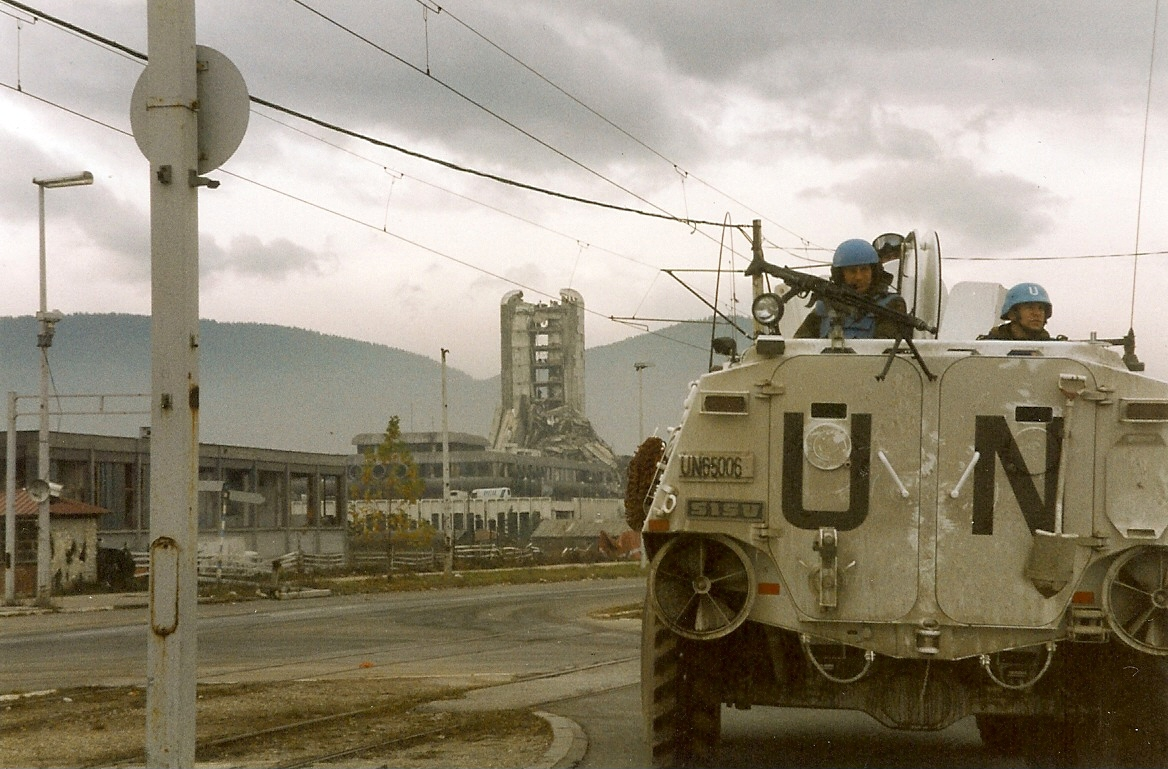
"Sniper Alley", pictured in 1995. During U2's Zoo TV Tour, Carter had to cross this area nightly to broadcast a satellite video feed from Sarajevo to the band.

Instead, the group agreed to use the tour's satellite dish to conduct live video transmissions from their concerts to Carter in Sarajevo. Carter returned to the city and assembled a video unit. The band purchased a satellite dish to be sent to Sarajevo and paid a £100,000 fee to join the European Broadcasting Union (EBU). Once set up, the band began satellite link-ups to Sarajevo on nearly a nightly basis, the first of which aired on 17 July 1993 in Bologna, Italy. To connect with the EBU satellite, Carter and two co-workers were forced to visit the Sarajevo television station at night and to film with as little light as possible to avoid the attention of snipers and bombers. To reach the building, they had to traverse an area known as "Sniper Alley". This was done a total of 12 times over the course of a month. During the broadcasts, Carter discussed the deteriorating situation in the city, and Bosnians often spoke to U2 and their audience. These grim interviews starkly contrasted with the rest of the show; concerts on the Zoo TV Tour were elaborately staged multimedia events that satirised television and the audience's overstimulation. Most of the shows were scripted, but the link-ups to Sarajevo were not, leaving the group unsure who would speak or what they would say. U2 stopped the broadcasts in August 1993 after learning that the siege of Sarajevo was being reported on the front of many British newspapers. Though this trend had begun before the band's first Sarajevo transmission, Nathan Jackson suggested that U2's actions had brought awareness of the situation to their fans and to the British public indirectly.

"Some nights it felt like it was part of the concert but a lot of nights it felt like quite an abrupt interruption that was probably not particularly welcomed by a lot of people in the audience. You were grabbed out of a rock concert and given a really strong dose of reality and it was quite hard sometimes to get back to something as frivolous as a show having watched five or ten minutes of real human suffering."

—The Edge, on the Sarajevo satellite link-ups

Reactions to the transmissions were mixed. Many fans felt the transmissions disrupted the flow of the concerts. Most of the British press was highly critical. One writer for NME wrote, "The Bosnian linkup was beyond bad taste. It was insulting." Bono thought that they were bringing the public's attention to an important event, though he admitted that the link-ups were the most difficult thing the band had done in their career. Guitarist the Edge said, "We don't normally see that kind of cold hard news. We get a very sanitized, editorialized take on everything... When you watch the television news, you are getting something palatable, whereas this was really quite unpalatable most of the time. And for that reason I think it affected people very much, including us." Mullen worried that the band were exploiting the Bosnians' suffering for entertainment. During a transmission from the band's concert at Wembley Stadium, three women in Sarajevo asked what the band intended to do to help before telling Bono, "We know you're not going to do anything for us. You're going to go back to a rock show. You're going to forget that we even exist. And we're all going to die." During a transmission to a Glasgow concert, a Bosnian woman told the concert audience, "We would like to hear the music, too, but we hear only the screams of wounded and tortured people and raped women." Some people were upset by the circumstances of Sarajevo and were motivated to join the War Child charity project, including U2 producer Brian Eno. Despite U2's obligation to the tour and their inability to perform in Sarajevo during the war, they vowed to play the city someday.

The band contributed to Bosnian relief efforts to enhance humanitarian and public awareness of the issue, and Bono and Carter subsequently collaborated on the documentary Miss Sarajevo, which showcased the war-torn city during Carter's six months living there. In 1995, U2 and Eno wrote the song "Miss Sarajevo" as a response to "the surreal acts of defiance that had taken place during the siege of Sarajevo". One such act was a beauty pageant organized by Bosnian women who planned to fight the war with their "lipstick and heels". During the pageant, all of the participants walked onto the stage carrying a banner that said, "Don't let them kill us". The winner of the pageant, 17-year-old Inela Nogić, later said the pageant "was a crazy thing to do during a war. But we tried to live a normal life. It was some kind of a defence mechanism we all had." Years later, Bono said, "It was pure Dada and it deserved to be celebrated in song." Of the song's meaning, he said, "Everywhere people had heard their call for help—but help never came. That was the feeling. I had tried to tackle subjects like this head-on, but I'd learnt a lesson. You have to try and make the same points, in a different, less direct, more surrealist way." "Miss Sarajevo" was recorded with Luciano Pavarotti and released as the first single from U2's side-project with Eno entitled Original Soundtracks 1; the record was released under the pseudonym "Passengers".

== Scheduling and preparations ==
"The fact that we can come and put on, not just a concert, but the same concert that we've put on in Paris, New York, and London, I think is maybe a symbol for the people of Sarajevo that things are getting back to normal."

—The Edge

As the Bosnian War ended in 1995 and the siege of Sarajevo in 1996, the stability of the region began to improve. Realizing this, U2 began to plan a concert for Sarajevo that would take place on their 1997 PopMart Tour. Although they were the first major musical artist to perform in the city following the war, China Drum had played a concert in July 1996. Music journalist Andrew Mueller described China Drum's experience in a single van as a "logistical and administrative nightmare". Muhamed Sacirbey, the Bosnian Ambassador to the United Nations, helped U2 make arrangements, playing an informal role as promoter and organizer. McGuinness said, "We thought it was going to be quite difficult. But it's been quite straightforward. People have just wanted to help. We've blagged a lot of equipment, forklifts and so on, from the military, and the local crew have been incredibly supportive."

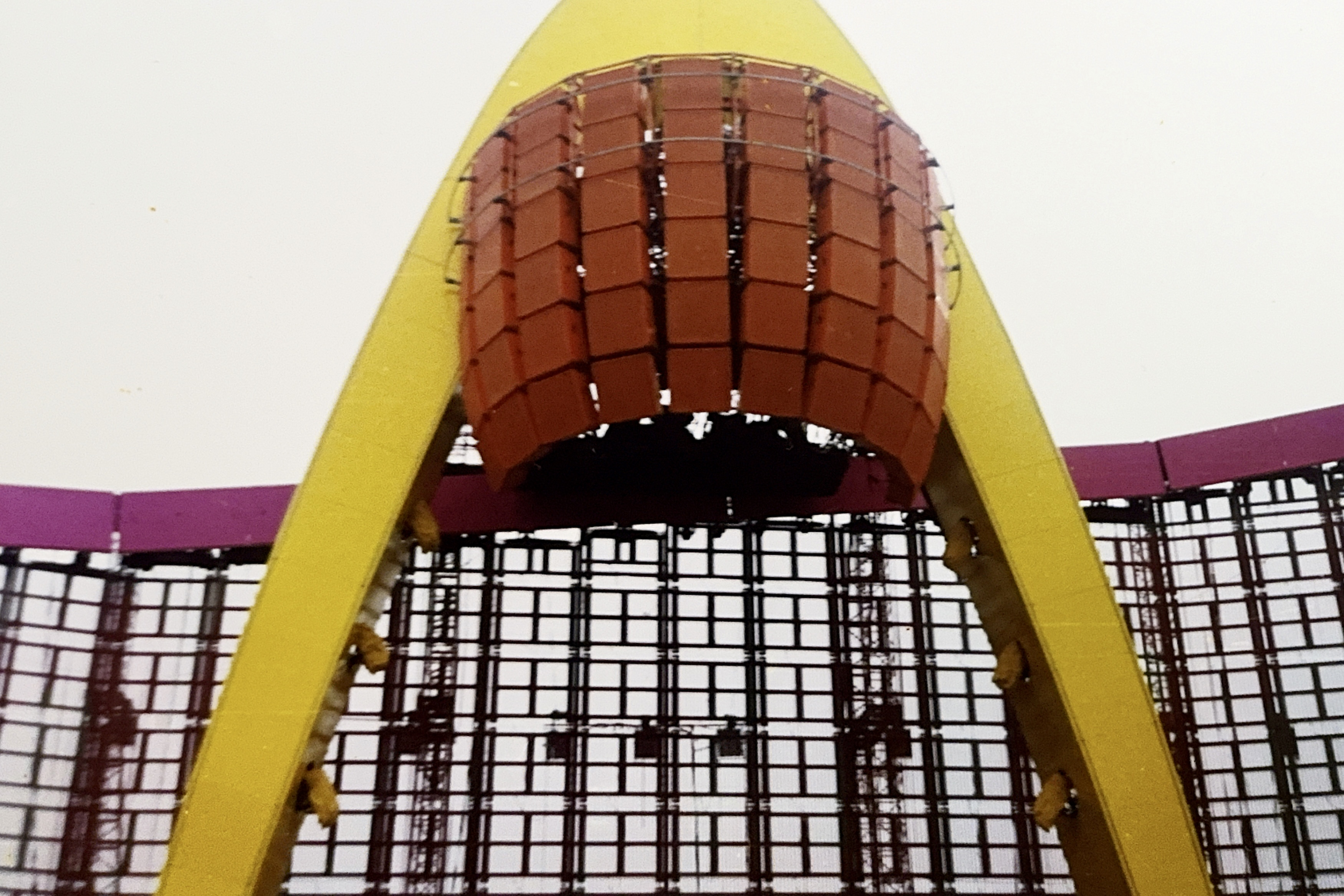
The PopMart Tour stage, prior to the concert

Scheduling the concert meant a financial loss of £500,000 for the band, despite sponsorship from Coca-Cola and GSM. Ticket prices were set at just DM 8 (£8, US$18), because of the 50 percent unemployment rate in the city. Bono offered for the group to perform a benefit concert or small show in Sarajevo, but the city requested they hold the full PopMart show. Bono said, "We offered to do a charity gig here, just turn up and do a scratch gig, but they wanted the whole fucking thing. They wanted the lemon!" McGuinness added, "we felt it was important that we treat this as another city on the tour, to pay them that respect. To come here and not do the whole show would have been rude." According to news releases following the concert, the total net income for the show was US$13,500; however, tour promoter John Giddings noted that price did not include the costs of the production or transportation.

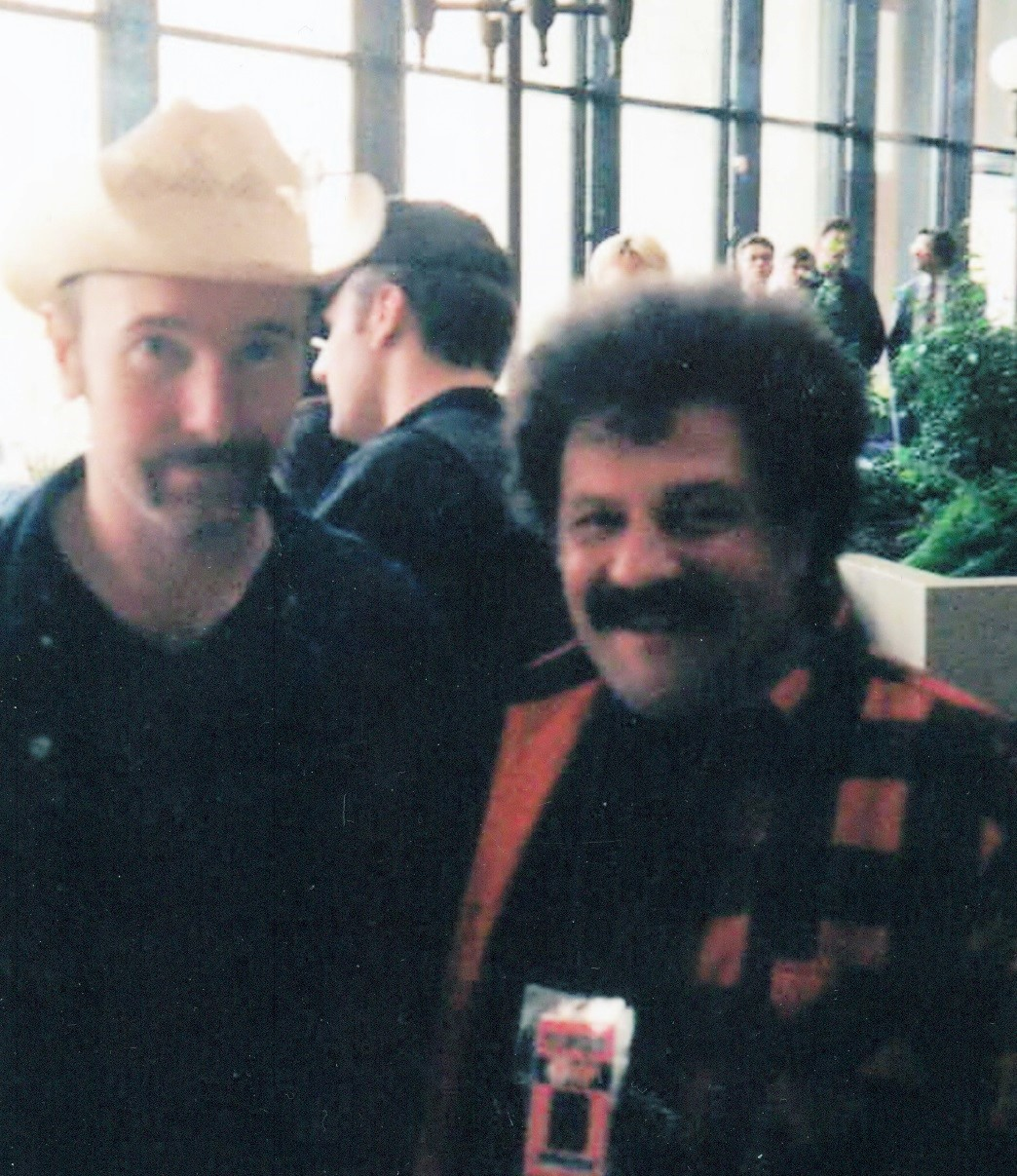
The Edge with Bosnian promoter Želimir Altarac Čičak on the day of the concert

As late as July 1997, U2 were pressured to accept an offer of approximately $4 million to perform in Basel, Switzerland on the date scheduled for the Sarajevo show. At the time, rumours about the region's instability persisted. To ensure the Sarajevo show was not canceled, Sacirbey appeared at many of the band's preceding shows to lobby on behalf of the city. For the stage to reach Sarajevo, the road crew had to drive the equipment and stage through war-torn Bosnia. Although the trip was without incident, they had to pass through towns such as Mostar, which had been "obliterated" during the war. Stage and lighting designer Willie Williams commented that "when the truck drivers arrived you could see that they were changed men". The only trouble in transporting the stage came when a border control agent prevented them from crossing the border for hours. The trucks reached Sarajevo two days prior to the concert, arriving to the cheers and applause of the city's residents; their arrival was the first concrete evidence that the band were keeping their promise to play there. McGuinness explained, "This is a city that's been disappointed so many times there were a lot of people who weren't prepared to believe the gig was going to take place until they saw the stage going up." Until then, tickets had sold very slowly, but within 24 hours of the trucks' arrival, another 8,000 tickets were sold. Despite this, a day before the concert, 15,000 tickets remained unsold. Three hundred local residents were employed to help assemble the stage and promote the show.

Several hundred members of the international "Stabilisation Force" (SFOR) were tasked with upholding the Dayton Agreement for the concert. The band were overwhelmed by the sights they saw when arriving. During the war, Koševo Stadium was used as a morgue, and graveyards were present on either sides. Although the venue had escaped the worst of the shelling, the nearby Olympic Hall Zetra had been badly damaged during the war. Despite its condition, U2 used the building for their dressing rooms and offices. Following the concert, it was used to provide lodging for 3,000 fans. The band's hotel, a nearby Holiday Inn, had been shelled during the siege, and part of the building had been destroyed as a result. The walls in Mullen's room were punctured with mortar shrapnel, and sections of the floor were also missing. Prior to the show, Sacirbey took Mullen on a tour of the city, showing him the Sarajevo Roses embedded in the streets.

"We worked quite hard to make sure tickets were available in Croatia and even from Republika Srpska we had about 1,000 people come down today which is great. We tried our best to make it as multi-ethnic as Sarajevo was, and will be again."

—Bono

On the day of the concert, trains ran into Sarajevo for the first time since the start of the war. Two lines were opened, one from Mostar to Sarajevo and the other from Maglaj to Sarajevo. Although the railways had been functional for the duration of the war, Muslim and Croat politicians could not decide who would operate them. As a result, the trains were only run on the date of the concert to bring fans to the city, and the day after to take them home again. Visa requirements were temporarily suspended. An effort was made to include all of the country's ethnic groups at the concert. Approximately 500 fans crossed the ethnic boundary lines between Bosnia's Serb Republic and the Moslem-Croat Federation. People from several of the other Yugoslavian republics went to Sarajevo for the concert, with buses carrying fans from Zagreb, Croatia and Ljubljana, Slovenia. Security around the event was strict. SFOR soldiers searched for bombs with sniffer dogs, and troops were on hand in the buildings around the stadium in case violence broke out.

== Concert overview ==
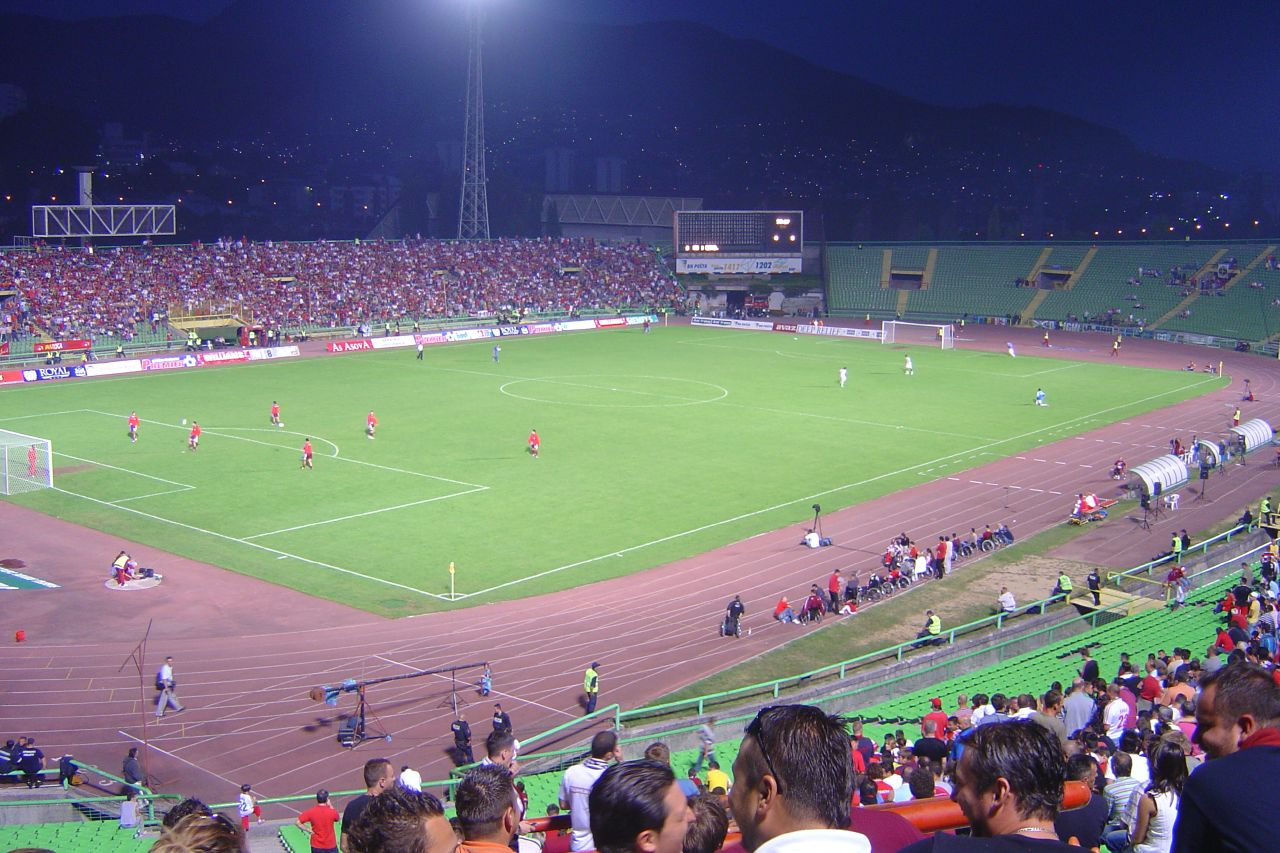
The concert took place at Koševo Stadium (pictured in 2003), which was previously used as a morgue during the war.

The concert was held on 23 September 1997, and approximately 45,000 people attended. It was televised locally in Bosnia on multiple networks, as well as globally by BBC. It was also broadcast live internationally on radio, with broadcasts in the United States being carried by Westwood One; all proceeds from the radio sales were donated to the War Child project. Audio from the concert was also webcast on the band's website at the time, u2popmart.msn.com.

During the event, 10,000 soldiers stood on the left side of the stadium to ensure no conflicts broke out. At showtime, a decision was made to open the stadium gates to all, allowing approximately 10,000 more fans who could not afford the concert or who had not purchased tickets in time to attend. In addition to the local and foreign fans, 6,000 off-duty SFOR soldiers attended the event in uniform. Inela Nogić attended the concert and arrived in a limo with the band.

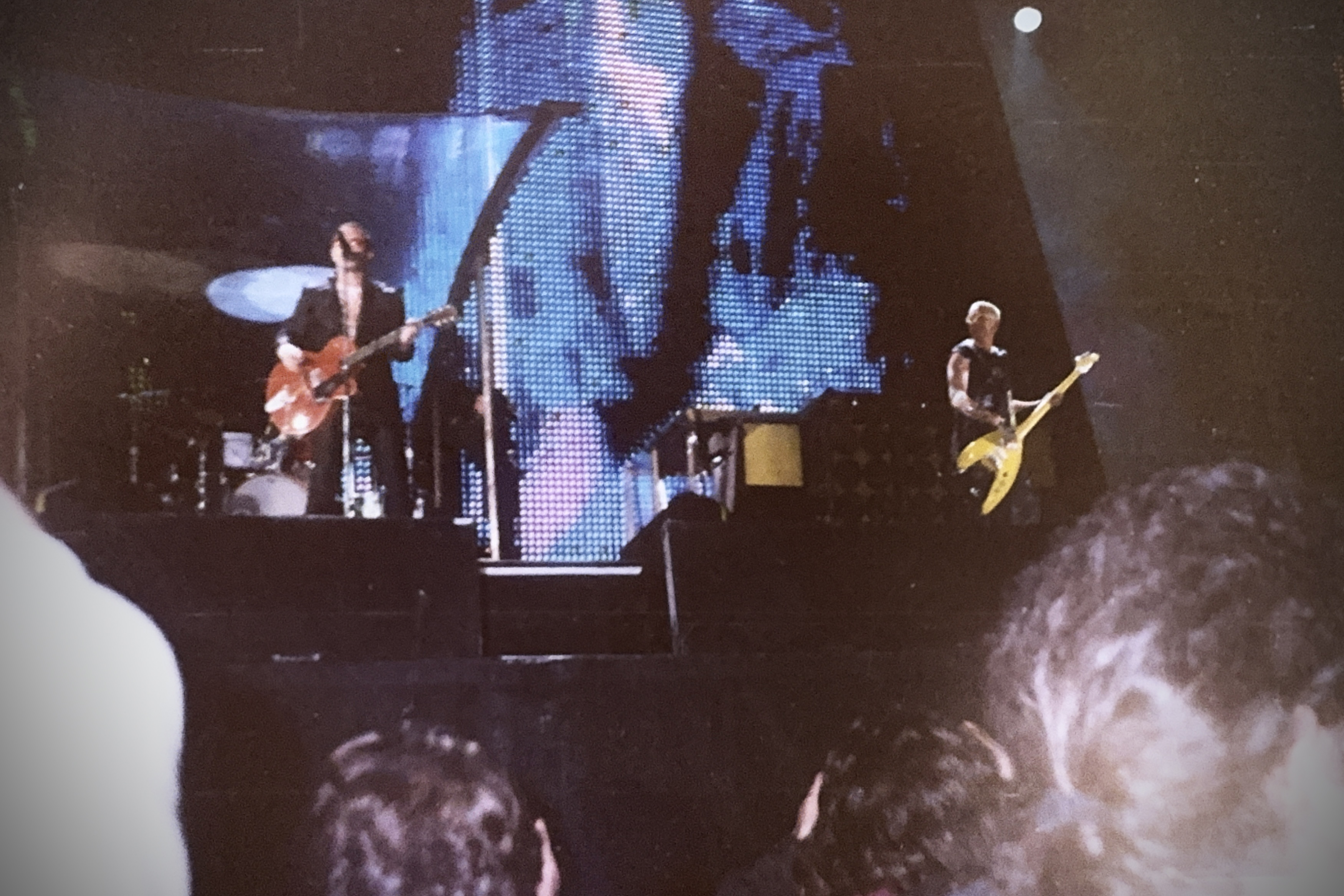
U2 performing during the concert

Three opening acts played before U2, beginning with the Gazi Huzrev-Beg choir, an Islamic choir from a local high school. Their performance was followed by two local bands, Protest and Sikter, one of which was chosen personally by Sacirbey, and the other which was selected through a radio contest. Following the opening acts, musician Howie B performed a DJ set before U2 took the stage.

The band's set list was similar to that of most shows on the PopMart Tour, but with "Sunday Bloody Sunday" in place of the Edge's karaoke segment and the addition of "Miss Sarajevo" in the second encore. The night was a celebration of the end of the war, with Bono setting the tone by shouting out "Viva Sarajevo! Fuck the past, kiss the future!" at the beginning of "Even Better Than the Real Thing". Bono had struggled with his voice throughout the tour, and the morning of the concert he woke up "without a voice". There was no intent to cancel, and the show went ahead as planned. Though Bono had few difficulties through the opening quartet of "Mofo", "I Will Follow", "Gone", and "Even Better Than the Real Thing", his voice gave out during "Last Night on Earth". In 2006, the Edge suggested that Bono's vocal troubles had been caused by laryngitis or by the stress of the previous few months of touring, though he later remarked that "it didn't really matter that our lead singer was under the weather because every member of the audience seemed to join in on every song. There was a mass chorus for the whole concert."

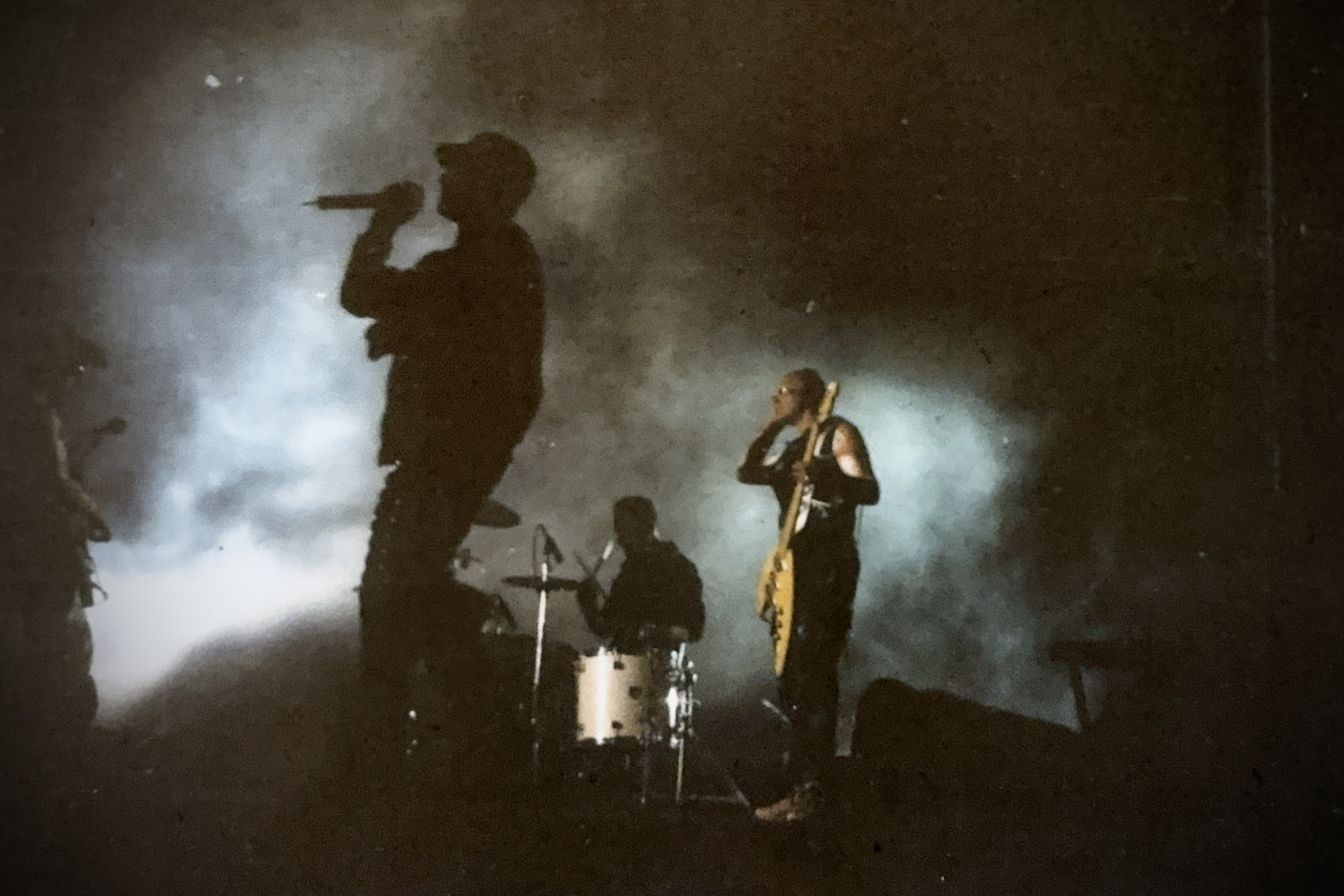
U2 performing on a B-stage during the concert

At various points during "Until the End of the World" and "New Year's Day", Bono gestured for the audience to help him with the vocals, and by the eighth song of the night, "Pride (In the Name of Love)", he was reduced to speaking the lyrics instead of singing them, with the Edge singing the chorus. The band continued with their standard set list by playing "I Still Haven't Found What I'm Looking For", "Stand By Me", "All I Want Is You", and "Staring at the Sun". U2 considered playing "Desire" after "All I Want Is You", but they chose not to perform the song. The Edge then performed a solo version of "Sunday Bloody Sunday". The rendition was slower and quieter than the studio version. During the song, Bono went backstage for cortisone injections, which helped to improve his voice for a short time. Brian Eno was prepared to go on stage to replace Bono if he could not continue, or to sing alongside him. Bono ultimately returned to the stage alone for the next song, "Bullet the Blue Sky", and the band continued with renditions of "Please" and "Where the Streets Have No Name", which concluded the main set.

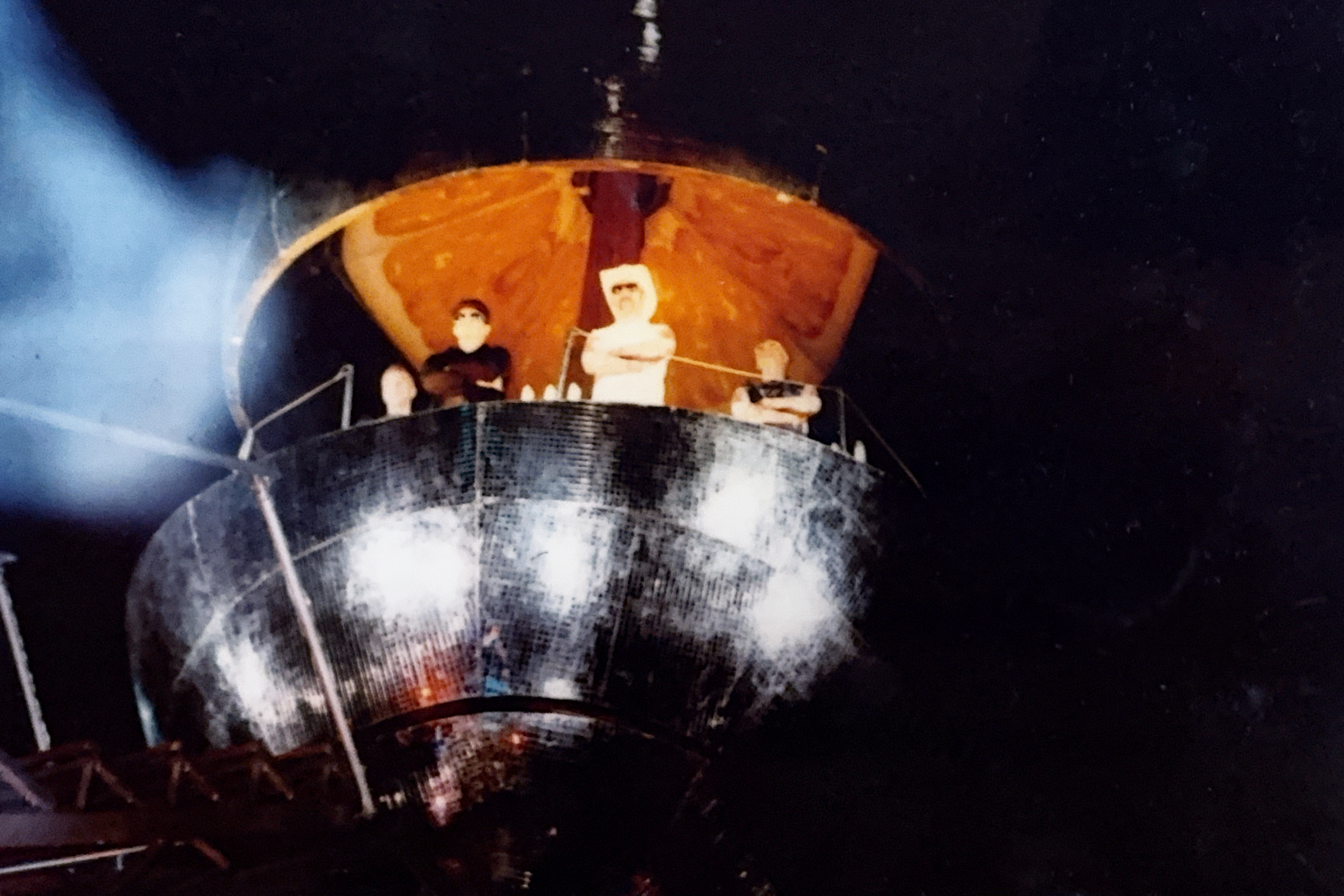
U2 emerging from the mirror-ball lemon during the concert prior to the encore

In the interlude before the first encore, U2 had a worried discussion over the introduction to "Miss Sarajevo". The song had only been played once prior—at a Pavarotti & Friends benefit concert in 1995 with Bono, the Edge, Eno, and Pavarotti. They returned to the stage and played "Discothèque", "If You Wear That Velvet Dress", "With or Without You", and a rough version of "Miss Sarajevo". Pavarotti was not at the concert to sing his part and so an antique gramophone was brought onto the stage in his place. Eno came on stage to sing backing vocals, and Bono invited Nogić on stage during the chorus. During the song, the video screen showed images from Carter's Miss Sarajevo documentary, including footage of the girls taking part in the beauty contest and the banner reading "Please don't let them kill us". Bono apologized for the rocky performance at the end of the song, saying "Sarajevo, this song was written for you. I hope you like it, because we can't fucking play it." The concert concluded with a second encore of "Hold Me, Thrill Me, Kiss Me, Kill Me", "Mysterious Ways", "One", and an abbreviated cover of "Unchained Melody".

After the band had walked offstage, in a move described by NME as the most meaningful of the concert, the audience faced the troops in the stadium and broke into a spontaneous round of applause, which quickly turned into an ovation—an act which the soldiers mimicked in turn.

== Reaction ==
"I'm not sure we were as big a part of the show as we thought. I think the show was really about the city of Sarajevo. And at the end they weren't just applauding us or the UN peace-keepers, they were kind of applauding themselves for getting through it."

—Bono

The day after the concert in Sarajevo, a local newspaper carried an editorial which was headlined, "Today was the day the siege of Sarajevo ended". In reaction to the event, a Bosnian student told members of the international press, "I felt excluded from the world for so long. It's not only about U2. It's the feeling of being part of the world." A local resident said that the concert was "proof that we have peace here, that everything is OK". Fans from outside the former Yugoslavia described Sarajevo as "an oasis of light" in the midst of destroyed and fire-damaged buildings, and deserted villages. Despite the subpar performance, the Associated Press said, "For two magical hours, the rock band U2 achieved what warriors, politicians and diplomats could not: They united Bosnia." Andrew Mueller of The Independent wrote, "For the first time since the start of the war in 1992, people more accustomed to seeing each other through the sights of a rifle were converging on the capital to listen to music together. It was a reminder of prewar Sarajevo, home to some of old Yugoslavia's best rock bands." Sacirbey stated that he was satisfied that the concert "was held to promote a sense of normalcy, peace and reconciliation in Sarajevo and not to raise money." He also expressed thanks on behalf of President Alija Izetbegović, who described the concert as a "landmark event".

Mullen and The Edge both agreed that playing the Sarajevo concert had been the highlight of their careers; Mullen said, "[t]here's no doubt that that is an experience I will never forget for the rest of my life. And if I had to spend 20 years in the band just to play that show, [...] I think it would have been worthwhile." Bono described it as "one of the toughest and one of the sweetest nights of my life", saying of the audience, "I think they wanted, more than anything, a return to normalcy. That's what these people want, it's what they deserve." He also speculated that the loss of his voice had "allowed room for Sarajevo to take the gig away from us. They could see that things could go horribly wrong, they'd gone to a lot of trouble to come here, and they were just going to make it happen. And they did." After the completion of the PopMart Tour, he said, "it was amazing and confounding to discover that on our most 'pop' of tours some of the best shows were in political hotspots like Santiago, Sarajevo, Tel Aviv [...] anywhere music meant more than entertainment". Following the concert, President Izetbegović presented Bono with an honorary Bosnian passport, in recognition of his humanitarian efforts during the war.

== Legacy ==
The peaceful nature of the U2 concert was fleeting, as violence flared up in the region the following year with the Kosovo War. NATO troops remained in Sarajevo until 2004, while European Union peace-keeping troops remain in the city.

Following the Sarajevo concert, the Edge's solo performance of "Sunday Bloody Sunday" was performed at the majority of shows for the remainder of the tour, and a recording of the song from the Sarajevo concert was released on the CD single for "If God Will Send His Angels" on 8 December 1997; The Edge later stated the band had "rediscovered" the song in Sarajevo after his solo performance. A short documentary about the concert, Missing Sarajevo, was included on the DVD release of U2's 2002 video compilation, The Best of 1990-2000.

After U2 first performed "Miss Sarajevo" at the Sarajevo concert, it was not performed again until the second leg of the Vertigo Tour in 2005. U2 did not return to perform in any country in the former Yugoslavia until August 2009, when they performed two shows in Zagreb during the U2 360° Tour. During the Zagreb shows, Bono stated that his honorary Bosnian passport was one of his "most treasured possessions", which prompted the country's Council of Ministers to announce that his passport was to be revoked, citing how country's laws do not allow honorary citizenships to be conferred.

In 2020, Spin ranked U2's performance in Sarajevo 7th on its list of the "35 Greatest Concerts of the Last 35 Years"; Bob Guccione Jr., who helped produce the concert, called it an "amazing, once-in-a-lifetime experience" and "given the circumstances, perhaps the most appreciated" concert on the list.

The 2023 documentary film Kiss the Future profiles the underground music scene in Sarajevo as a means of resistance and inspiration during the Bosnian War. The film covers U2's involvement in bringing attention to the Siege of Sarajevo, as well as their 1997 concert in the city. Directed by Nenad Cicin-Sain and co-produced by Matt Damon and Ben Affleck through Artists Equity, the film features commentary from Carter, who wrote the screenplay, along with interviews with three members of U2 – Bono, the Edge, and bassist Adam Clayton. It premiered at the 73rd Berlin International Film Festival in 2023, and was released cinematically by AMC Theatres in February 2024, screening at 139 theatres.

== Setlist ==
Excluding lyrical snippets, U2's performance consisted of 23 songs:

1. "Mofo"
2. "I Will Follow"
3. "Gone"
4. "Even Better Than the Real Thing"
5. "Last Night on Earth"
6. "Until the End of the World"
7. "New Year's Day"
8. "Pride (In the Name of Love)"
9. "I Still Haven't Found What I'm Looking For"
10. "All I Want Is You"
11. "Staring at the Sun"
12. "Sunday Bloody Sunday"
13. "Bullet the Blue Sky"
14. "Please"
15. "Where the Streets Have No Name"

Encore

16. "Discothèque"
17. "If You Wear That Velvet Dress"
18. "With or Without You"
19. "Miss Sarajevo"
20. "Hold Me, Thrill Me, Kiss Me, Kill Me"
21. "Mysterious Ways"
22. "One"
23. "Unchained Melody"
