= Last Night on Earth (song) =

1997 single by U2

Single by U2

from the album Pop
- B-side: "Pop Muzik"; "Happiness Is a Warm Gun"
- Released: 1 July 1997
- Genre: Alternative rock
- Length: 4:46 (album version); 4:14 (single version)
- Label: Island
- Composer: U2
- Lyricists: Bono; the Edge
- Producer: Flood

U2 singles chronology
"Staring at the Sun" (1997)	"Last Night on Earth" (1997)	"Please" (1997)

Music videos
- "Last Night on Earth" on YouTube
- "Last Night on Earth (First Night in Hell Mix)" on YouTube

"Last Night on Earth" is a song by the Irish rock band U2. It is the sixth track on their ninth studio album, Pop (1997), and was released by as its third single on 1 July 1997 by Island Records. The song includes excerpts from "Trayra Boia", written by Naná Vasconcelos and Denise Milan. Its music video was directed by Richie Smyth and filmed in the US.

== History ==
"Last Night on Earth" was first written during the Zooropa sessions as documented by rock DJ and journalist BP Fallon in his book U2 Faraway So Close. It was put aside until a later date, and when the band started work on Pop between 1995 and early 1997 they dug it up again. Assuming they had plenty of time to finish recording the songs for the album, the band told manager Paul McGuinness to go ahead and book their PopMart Tour, which was to begin in April 1997. As time got closer and closer to the start of the tour, the band began running out of time to finish recording the album, which was to be released that March. The band immediately regretted their decision to let McGuinness book the tour, and had to rush their recording sessions to release the album in time. "Last Night on Earth" was one of the last songs to be recorded for the album. As the band and their associates had been working up until the last minute to finish recording and mixing the album, lead vocalist Bono did not come up with the song's chorus until 4 a.m. during the last night in the studio. After being up all night, Bono began singing the line "You've got to give it away", and decided to use it as part of the song's chorus. Once the chorus has been written, it needed to be recorded immediately. However, Bono had completely lost his voice at the time, so echoes were added to his voice, as well as backing vocals by guitarist the Edge.

Since the initial recording of the song was done at the last minute, the band went back into the recording studio during the tour to record the song for its single release. Out of Pop's six single releases, this was the first of three songs to be re-recorded for its single. The single was released in July 1997, and its cover featured a pop art-like parody of The Scream featuring the Edge. Following the single's release, "Please" and "If God Will Send His Angels" were later also re-recorded and released as singles in October and December 1997, respectively.

== Critical reception ==
Kevin Courtney from Irish Times wrote, "Once again, it's the end of the world as U2 know it, and the band is gonna party like it's 1999. The dance beats give way to full on guitar riffs, The Edge getting down and dirty with his toggle switch and whammy bar, and Bono chanting the urgent chorus of 'you've got to give it away.' Nothing groundbreaking here, then, and even the themes are all too familiar, but this one nicely fulfills the 'primary colours' criterion." British magazine Music Week gave the song three out of five, adding, "U2 singles seem to be coming thick and fast at the moment. This, the third instalment from Pop, has a big, noisy, chorus but will it help album sales step up a gear?"

== Live performances ==
"Last Night on Earth" was one of 17 songs to be played at each of the 93 PopMart shows, where six of the 17 songs were from Pop. With the exception of the first several shows of the tour, the song was played in the fifth spot of the set list, between "Even Better Than the Real Thing" and "Until the End of the World". Live performances typically lasted longer than the length of the song on the album, as they featured several additions that were not present in the studio recording. Before the first verse, Bono would start the song by saying something similar to the following:

I went looking...
I went looking for spirit... Found alcohol
I went looking for soul... And I bought some style
I wanted to meet God... But you sold me religion

During the middle of the song, the band would slow down their tempo, and Bono improvise lyrics beginning with "It's not the last night on earth" and would typically make references to the city or country in which the band was performing. The end of the song featured a guitar jam, featuring both Bono and the Edge playing electric guitar. Despite the changes made to the song during its live performances, it was one of two songs that retained its original album arrangement, along with "Please". The other songs performed live from Pop were completely rearranged and restructured for their live performances by the time the band was halfway through their tour.

The giant vidi-walls behind the band would display a cartoon during "Last Night on Earth" that depicted the characters being bombarded with stimulants at malls and shops and also made reference to the growing gun issue in the United States.

The only officially released live performance was taken from the band's show in Mexico City. The video PopMart: Live from Mexico City features "Last Night on Earth", and the same performance was later released as an audio track on the "Elevation" single in 2001. Despite this, "Last Night on Earth" has not been performed at all since the end of the PopMart Tour.

== Music video ==
The video was filmed in Kansas City, Missouri, and directed by Richie Smyth. It features Sophie Dahl and William S. Burroughs in his final filmed performance.

The production of a portion of the video required the closure of Interstate 670, a major downtown Kansas City freeway, as well as several local streets.

A different music video was made for the "First Night in Hell Mix" by Jon Carter. It was directed by John Bland, and mostly consists of a tracking shot of the Nile shoreline.

== Formats and track listings ==
Cassette release
No.	Title	Writer(s)	Length
1.	"Last Night on Earth" (Single version)	U2 (music), Bono and the Edge (lyrics)	4:14
2.	"Pop Muzik" (Pop Mart mix)	Robin Scott	8:50

CD version 1
No.	Title	Writer(s)	Length
1.	"Last Night on Earth" (Single version)	U2 (music), Bono and the Edge (lyrics)	4:14
2.	"Pop Muzik" (Pop Mart mix)	Robin Scott	8:50
3.	"Happiness Is a Warm Gun" (Gun mix)	Lennon–McCartney	4:46

CD version 2
No.	Title	Writer(s)	Length
1.	"Last Night on Earth" (First Night in Hell mix)	U2 (music), Bono and the Edge (lyrics)	5:50
2.	"Numb" (Soul Assassins mix)	U2 (music), the Edge (lyrics)	3:58
3.	"Happiness Is a Warm Gun" (Danny Saber mix)	Lennon–McCartney	4:51
4.	"Pop Muzik" (Pop Mart mix)	Robin Scott	8:50

Canadian and US release
No.	Title	Writer(s)	Length
1.	"Last Night on Earth" (Single version)	U2 (music), Bono and the Edge (lyrics)	4:14
2.	"Pop Muzik" (Pop Mart mix)	Robin Scott	8:50
3.	"Happiness Is a Warm Gun" (Gun mix)	Lennon–McCartney	4:46
4.	"Numb" (Soul Assassins mix)	U2 (music), the Edge (lyrics)	3:58

== Personnel ==
- Bono – lead vocals, guitar
- The Edge – guitar, backing vocals, keyboards
- Adam Clayton – bass guitar
- Larry Mullen Jr. – drums, percussion

== Charts ==
=== Weekly charts ===
Chart (1997)	Peak position
Australia (ARIA)	32
Austria (Ö3 Austria Top 40)	31
Belgium (Ultratop 50 Flanders)	29
Canada Top Singles (RPM)	18
Canada Rock/Alternative (RPM)	1
Europe (Eurochart Hot 100)	25
Finland (Suomen virallinen lista)	6
Germany (GfK)	60
Iceland (Íslenski Listinn Topp 40)	11
Ireland (IRMA)	11
Italy (Musica e dischi)	17
Italy Airplay (Music & Media)	4
Netherlands (Dutch Top 40)	17
Netherlands (Single Top 100)	14
New Zealand (Recorded Music NZ)	36
Norway (VG-lista)	20
Scottish Singles Sales (Official Charts)	8
Sweden (Sverigetopplistan)	43
UK Singles (Official Charts)	10
US Billboard Hot 100	57
US Adult Alternative Airplay (Billboard)	13
US Alternative Airplay (Billboard)	11
US Dance Singles Sales (Billboard)	22
US Mainstream Rock (Billboard)	18

=== Year-end charts ===
Chart (1997)	Position
Canada Rock/Alternative (RPM)	12
US Modern Rock Tracks (Billboard)	71

== See also ==
- List of covers of U2 songs - Last Night on Earth
- List of RPM Rock/Alternative number-one singles (Canada)
