= PopMart: Live from Mexico City =

1998 concert video and live album by U2

Video by U2
- Released: 22 November 1998
- Recorded: 3 December 1997
- Venues: Foro Sol (Mexico City, Mexico)
- Genres: Rock, alternative rock
- Length: 126 minutes
- Labels: Island, PolyGram, UMG
- Director: David Mallet
- Producer: Ned O'Hanlon

U2 chronology
| The Best of 1980–1990 (1998) | PopMart: Live from Mexico City (1998) | Hasta la Vista Baby! U2 Live from Mexico City (2000) |

PopMart: Live from Mexico City is a concert film by Irish rock band U2. It was shot on 3 December 1997 at Foro Sol in Mexico City, Mexico, during their PopMart Tour. It was released on VHS and Video CD in November 1998, and was re-released in September 2007 on DVD. It was nominated for the Grammy Award for Best Long Form Music Video in 2000. Select songs from the release were featured on the 2000 live album Hasta la Vista Baby! U2 Live from Mexico City.

== Footage ==
The show opens with the non-dance version of "Mofo", and contains standard PopMart setlist inclusions. Bono forgets some of the lyrics of "Desire" during the acoustic set. Michael Hutchence, lead singer of INXS and a close friend to the band members, had died by suicide approximately two weeks earlier; the performance of "One" was tearfully dedicated to him, with Bono changing some of the lyrics to reflect his grief. While minor edits were made before release (such as Bono telling a fan to turn his laser pointer off at the end of "New Year's Day") this is the only U2 home video to date that contains a concert's complete setlist. Selected tracks from this performance were later released on the 2000 exclusive fan club-only live album, Hasta la Vista Baby!

== Release ==
Beginning on 8 June 2000, PopMart: Live from Mexico City was webcast online for three weeks using Burst.com's streaming technology.

The concert was one of the first titles slated for release in the DVD format and previews for it appeared on PolyGram DVDs of the time. PolyGram quietly cancelled the release. In July 2007 Universal Music announced a September 2007 DVD release, under the Island Records label. The DVD was released in one and two-disc editions, similar to the preceding DVD release of Zoo TV: Live from Sydney. Both editions feature the concert in its original 4:3 aspect ratio, remixed with Dolby Digital 5.1, DTS 5.1, and PCM Stereo audio. The two-disc format features the following bonus features on disc two:

- Bonus Tracks
  - "Please," "Where the Streets Have No Name," "Discothèque" and "If You Wear That Velvet Dress" – taken live from Feyenoord Stadium, Rotterdam, 18 July 1997
  - "Hold Me, Thrill Me, Kiss Me, Kill Me," "Mysterious Ways" and "One" – taken live from Commonwealth Stadium, Edmonton, 14 June 1997
- Bonus Music Videos
  - "Staring at the Sun" (Miami Version) – directed by Morleigh Steinberg
  - "Last Night on Earth - First Night in Hell" (Remix Version) – directed by John Bland
- Documentaries
  - Lemon For Sale
  - The Road To Sarajevo
  - A Tour of the Tour
  - Last Night on Earth - One Day in Kansas
- PopMart Tour Visuals Montage – curated by Catherine Owens
- Extras
  - DVD-ROM features
- Easter egg (a video showing Dublin docklands).

On 15 March 2021, U2 announced a concert broadcast series called "The Virtual Road" in partnership with YouTube, by which four of the group's past concert films were remastered and streamed on the band's official YouTube channel for 48 hours each. Popmart: Live from Mexico City began streaming on 1 April, with a pre-recorded performance by Mexican musician Carla Morrison serving as an "opening act". To coincide with the broadcast event, a four-track EP of songs from PopMart: Live from Mexico City was released to streaming services and digital stores.

== Reception ==
Professional ratings
Review scores
| Source | Rating |
|---|---|
| The Age | 3/4 stars |
| Allmusic | 3.5/5 stars |
| The Austin Chronicle (2007) | 2/5 stars |
| Entertainment Weekly | B− |
| The Irish Times (2007) | 4/5 stars |
| Video Librarian (2007) | 3/4 stars |

Rob Brunner of Entertainment Weekly said that "unless your living room is the size of the Mexican stadium where this show was shot... the TV version of the PopMart behemoth will seem numbingly excessive, despite energetic versions of 'Where the Streets Have No Name' and 'New Year's Day'". Ben Wener of the Orange County Register said the video "convincingly argues that the much-ballyhooed south of the border jaunt.. wasn't as bad as first imagined" and that though it is unlikely to change fans' minds about their "mediocre tunes" of the time, "it does prove that, in the show's best moments, U2 was trying to accomplish something beyond flash and kitsch". Lawrie Zion of The Age said, "though hardly groundbreaking, the Popmart tour turned out to be an above-average fan pleaser and the video shows a band that obviously knows how to get the most out of the stadium environment". She singled out the Edge's solo performance of "Sunday Bloody Sunday" as the highlight.

Reviewing the DVD, Raoul Hernandez of The Austin Chronicle lamented the group's wardrobe and lemon prop from the tour, adding, "Equally dated, Pop's disco beats can't smoke and mirror their compositional backbone of the two-hour set, 'Gone,' 'Last Night on Earth,' acoustic Bono/Edge duet 'Staring at the Sun,' 'Please,' and encore 'Discothèque' highlighting the distracted circus onstage." Bob Gendron of the Chicago Tribune thought the tour pushed "ironic spectacle to laughable extremes", with a stage design that dwarfed U2 and silly attire choices. Despite this, he said, "Sometimes the biggest mistakes make for great entertainment", adding: "The pageantry works on DVD. See it if only to witness an ostentatious concept that raises the question of why nobody possessed the sense to prevent it from happening." John Kosik of the Associated Press called the DVD "an indispensable snapshot of the band at the close of the most adventurous period of their career". He praised the group's reworking of past songs and said the transition between Pop's "Mofo" and early single "I Will Follow" shows "that even U2's wildest experiments are still rooted in their past – and that notion is sprinkled throughout the two-hour concert".

== Track listing ==
All songs were written by U2, except for "Pop Muzik," which was written by M's Robin Scott.

1. "Pop Muzik"
2. "Mofo"
3. "I Will Follow"
4. "Gone"
5. "Even Better Than the Real Thing"
6. "Last Night on Earth"
7. "Until the End of the World"
8. "New Year's Day"
9. "Pride (In the Name of Love)"
10. "I Still Haven't Found What I'm Looking For"
11. "All I Want Is You"
12. "Desire"
13. "Staring at the Sun"
14. "Sunday Bloody Sunday"
15. "Bullet the Blue Sky"
16. "Please"
17. "Where the Streets Have No Name"
18. "Lemon" (Perfecto mix)
19. "Discothèque"
20. "If You Wear That Velvet Dress"
21. "With or Without You"
22. "Hold Me, Thrill Me, Kiss Me, Kill Me"
23. "Mysterious Ways"
24. "One"
25. "Wake Up Dead Man"

"Pop Muzik" and "Lemon" (Perfecto mix) are pre-recorded and played as the band makes its grand entrances through the audience at the beginning of the show and via mirrorball lemon for the first encore.

== Album release ==
Hasta la Vista Baby! U2 Live from Mexico City

Live album by U2
- Released: Autumn 2000
- Recorded: 3 December 1997, Foro Sol, Mexico City, Mexico
- Genre: Rock
- Length: 69:20
- Label: Island

U2 chronology
| PopMart: Live from Mexico City (1998) | Hasta la Vista Baby! U2 Live from Mexico City (2000) | All That You Can't Leave Behind (2000) |

Professional ratings
Review scores
| Source | Rating |
|---|---|
| AllMusic | 3.5/5 stars |

Selections from the Mexico City concert were released on the live album Hasta la Vista Baby! U2 Live from Mexico City. The album was released exclusively to members of U2's fan club magazine, Propaganda, in 2000. It features 14 songs from the band's 25-song performance.

=== Track listing ===
All tracks are written by U2, except "Pop Muzik" which was written and recorded by M.

| No. | Title | Length |
|---|---|---|
| 1. | "Pop Muzik" (Played over the intercom as the band walked onstage) | 3:09 |
| 2. | "Mofo" | 4:36 |
| 3. | "I Will Follow" | 2:51 |
| 4. | "Gone" | 4:41 |
| 5. | "New Year's Day" | 4:59 |
| 6. | "Staring at the Sun" | 4:32 |
| 7. | "Bullet the Blue Sky" | 6:11 |
| 8. | "Please" | 6:58 |
| 9. | "Where the Streets Have No Name" | 6:35 |
| 10. | "Lemon (Perfecto Mix)" (Played over the intercom during the first encore) | 2:05 |
| 11. | "Discothèque" | 5:09 |
| 12. | "With or Without You" | 5:47 |
| 13. | "Hold Me, Thrill Me, Kiss Me, Kill Me" | 5:39 |
| 14. | "One" | 6:07 |
| Total length: | | 69:20 |

== Charts and certifications ==
=== Weekly charts ===
| Chart (1998) | Peak position |
|---|---|
| US Top Video Sales (Billboard) | 17 |

| Chart (2007) | Peak position |
|---|---|
| Austrian Music DVD (Ö3 Austria) | 2 |
| Belgian Music DVD (Ultratop Wallonia) | 1 |
| Belgian Music DVD (Ultratop Flanders) | 1 |
| Danish Music DVD (Hitlisten) | 2 |
| Dutch Music DVD (MegaCharts) | 2 |
| German Albums (Offizielle Top 100) | 15 |
| Hungarian DVDs (MAHASZ) | 4 |
| Italian Music DVD (FIMI) | 1 |
| Japanese DVDs Chart (Oricon) | 48 |
| Spanish Music DVD (Promusicae) | 1 |
| Swedish Music DVD (Sverigetopplistan) | 1 |
| UK Music Videos (Official Charts) | 2 |
| US Top Music Videos (Billboard) | 1 |

| Chart (2009) | Peak position |
|---|---|
| French Music DVD (SNEP) | 18 |
| Swiss Music DVD (Schweizer Hitparade) | 4 |

=== Year-end charts ===
| Chart (2007) | Position |
|---|---|
| Belgian Music DVD (Ultratop Flanders) | 17 |
| Belgian Music DVD (Ultratop Wallonia) | 31 |
| Dutch Music DVD (MegaCharts) | 14 |
| Swedish Music DVD (Sverigetopplistan) | 35 |

| Chart (2008) | Position |
|---|---|
| Belgian Music DVD (Ultratop Flanders) | 42 |

| Chart (2009) | Position |
|---|---|
| Swedish Music DVD (Sverigetopplistan) | 82 |

=== Certifications ===
| Region | Certification | Certified units/sales |
|---|---|---|
| Australia (ARIA) | Gold | 7,500^{^} |
| Brazil (Pro-Música Brasil) | Gold | 25,000^{*} |
| Mexico (AMPROFON) | Platinum | 20,000^{^} |
| United Kingdom (BPI) | Platinum | 50,000^{*} |
^{*} Sales figures based on certification alone.^{^} Shipments figures based on certification alone.
