= Bill Carter =

American film director

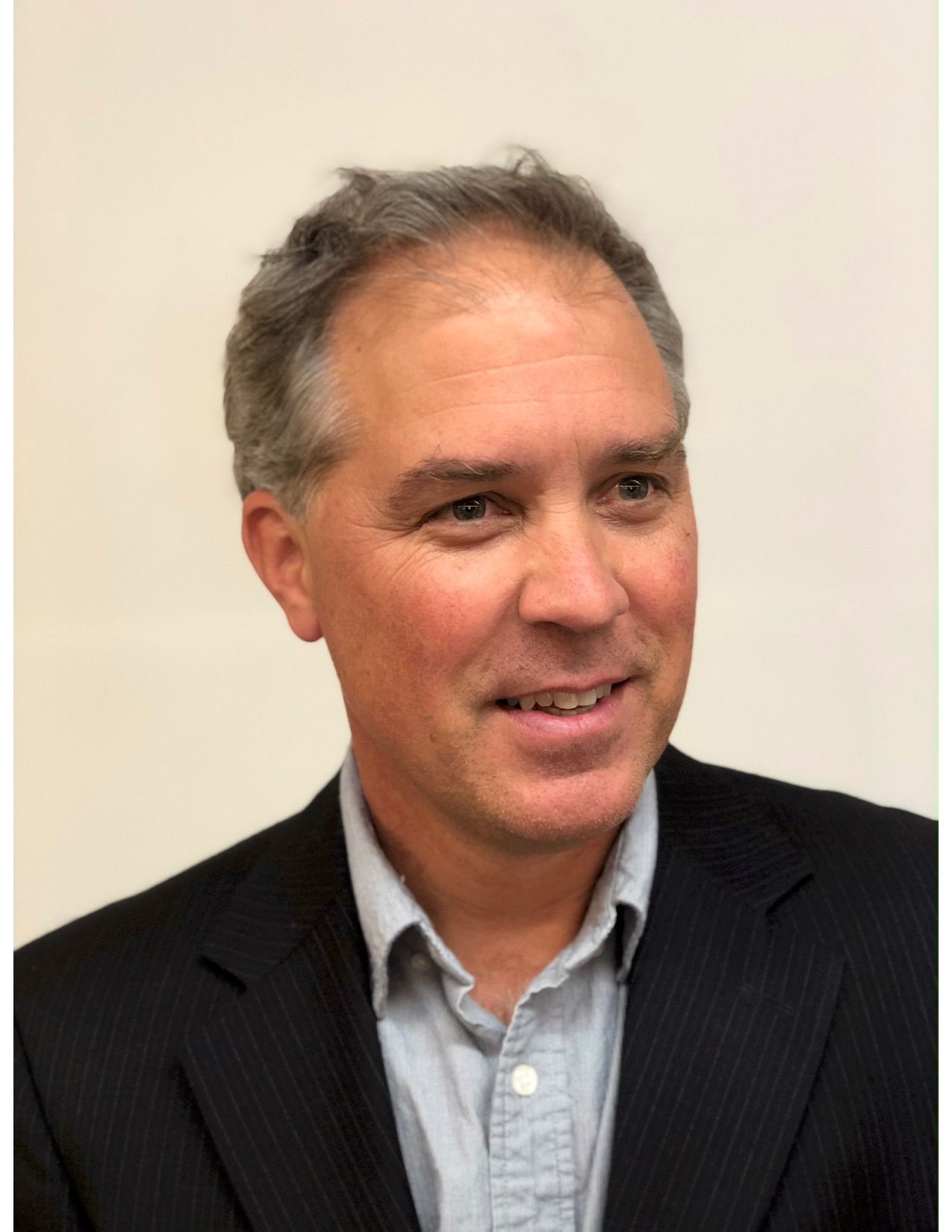
- Born: 1966 (age 59–60); United States
- Occupations: Film director, screenwriter
- Known for: Director, Miss Sarajevo; Screenplay (feature documentary) of Kiss the Future, based on his memoir Fools Rush In
- Website: billcarter.cc

Bill Carter (born 1966) is an American writer and director. He directed the documentary film Miss Sarajevo, which consists of amateur video material he shot during his stay in Sarajevo while the city was under siege. He is the author of Fools Rush In, his memoirs of working for an aid agency during the Bosnian War. He teaches journalism and film at Northern Arizona University.

Carter also wrote and executive produced Kiss the Future, a feature documentary that tells the story of how he teamed up with U2 during the siege in Sarajevo to get live video messages out to Europe.

== Biography ==
Carter became involved in the Balkan conflict when he was traveling the world after his girlfriend died in a car crash in 1991. After traveling to Split, he joined The Serious Road Trip, a humanitarian aid organization distributing food and medicine to places the United Nations and the Red Cross would not go. Arriving in Sarajevo, he decided to stay with the Sarajevans, inspired by the way they tried to maintain the life they had before the siege began. He saw Sarajevo as key because Sarajevans refused to be divided along ethnic lines with many Serbs joining the defence of the city against the Serb nationalist besiegers.

Carter began to do some work for the Sarajevan television, and he managed to get an interview with Bono from rock group U2. Bono, who later admitted that he was deeply touched by Bill Carter's story, heard about the importance of pop music in Sarajevo and said that he would love to play in Sarajevo. Carter quickly concluded that this was too dangerous—not least because the large gathering of fans that would assemble might be shelled by the besieging Serb nationalists. Instead, Carter came up with another way of connecting rock music with Sarajevans; instead of "bringing U2 to Sarajevo" he would "bring Sarajevo to U2", by means of satellite linkups to U2's Zoo TV Tour concerts, giving the people of Sarajevo a chance to tell their story to the world.

In 1995, Carter made the documentary film Miss Sarajevo out of the video material he recorded. Bono insisted that he would call the film Miss Sarajevo, after the beauty contest Sarajevans organized during the siege, and wrote a song by the same title as soundtrack to the film. Miss Sarajevo won the International Monitor Award, the Golden Hugo Award and the Maverick Director Award, Newport Beach Film Festival.

In 1997, when U2 finally performed in Sarajevo during their PopMart Tour, Carter was in the audience, meeting with the friends he had made during the siege. Carter wrote an acclaimed memoir about these experiences titled Fools Rush In that was shortlisted for a BBC book club upon first publication and received critical praise from Bono, Jon Krakauer, Jim Harrison and Charles Bowden among others.

On April 6, 2009, Carter was awarded honorary citizenship by the city of Sarajevo, the highest civilian award possible for those that helped the city during the siege of Sarajevo in the Bosnian War.

Carter's second book, Red Summer, tells the story of his time as a commercial salmon fisherman in a remote Alaskan village over a four-year span. Both books were shortlisted by Nancy Pearl as among her top "armchair travel books."

Bill Carter's newest book, Boom, Bust, Boom: A Story About Copper, The Metal That Runs The World won the Arizona/New Mexico Book Award for nonfiction in 2013. "Boom, Bust, Boom" is an account of the all-pervasive presence of copper in our lives and its cost for human health, economy, and the environment - with personal discovery interwoven that begins after Carter is poisoned by the vegetables grown in his family garden. The book goes from Arizona to Indonesia to Bristol Bay, Alaska and back again and has received high marks from authors including Sebastian Junger, Luis Alberto Urrea, Jim Harrison.
