= List of number-one singles of 1997 (Ireland) =

The following is a list of the IRMA's number-one singles of 1997. The dates shown below are Fridays.

Issue date	Song	Artist	Ref.
3 January	"2 Become 1"	Spice Girls	
10 January	"2 Become 1"	Spice Girls	
17 January	"2 Become 1"	Spice Girls	
24 January	"Where Do You Go"	No Mercy	
31 January	"I Finally Found Someone"	Barbra Streisand and Bryan Adams	
7 February	"Discothèque"	U2	
14 February	"Discothèque"	U2	
21 February	"Don't Speak"	No Doubt	
28 February	"Don't Speak"	No Doubt	
7 March	"Don't Speak"	No Doubt	
14 March	"Mama"/"Who Do You Think You Are"	Spice Girls	
21 March	"Mama"/"Who Do You Think You Are"	Spice Girls	
28 March	"Mama"/"Who Do You Think You Are"	Spice Girls	
4 April	"Mama"/"Who Do You Think You Are"	Spice Girls	
11 April	"Encore une fois"	Sash!	
18 April	"I Believe I Can Fly"	R. Kelly	
25 April	"I Believe I Can Fly"	R. Kelly	
2 May	"I Believe I Can Fly"	R. Kelly	
9 May	"I Believe I Can Fly"	R. Kelly	
16 May	"I Believe I Can Fly"	R. Kelly	
23 May	"Con Te Partiro (Time to Say Goodbye)"	Sarah Brightman and Andrea Bocelli	
30 May	"Con Te Partiro (Time to Say Goodbye)"	Sarah Brightman and Andrea Bocelli	
6 June	"Con Te Partiro (Time to Say Goodbye)"	Sarah Brightman and Andrea Bocelli	
13 June	"MMMBop"	Hanson	
20 June	"MMMBop"	Hanson	
27 June	"MMMBop"	Hanson	
4 July	"I'll Be Missing You"	Puff Daddy and Faith Evans feat. 112	
11 July	"D'You Know What I Mean?"	Oasis	
18 July	"D'You Know What I Mean?"	Oasis	
25 July	"I'll Be Missing You"	Puff Daddy and Faith Evans feat. 112	
1 August	"I'll Be Missing You"	Puff Daddy and Faith Evans feat. 112	
8 August	"I'll Be Missing You"	Puff Daddy and Faith Evans feat. 112	
15 August	"I'll Be Missing You"	Puff Daddy and Faith Evans feat. 112	
22 August	"Men In Black"	Will Smith	
29 August	"Men In Black"	Will Smith	
5 September	"Men In Black"	Will Smith	
12 September	"Tubthumping"	Chumbawamba	
19 September	"Candle in the Wind 1997"/"Something About The Way You Look Tonight"	Elton John	
26 September	"Candle in the Wind 1997"/"Something About The Way You Look Tonight"	Elton John	
3 October	"Candle in the Wind 1997"/"Something About The Way You Look Tonight"	Elton John	
10 October	"Candle in the Wind 1997"/"Something About The Way You Look Tonight"	Elton John	
17 October	"Candle in the Wind 1997"/"Something About The Way You Look Tonight"	Elton John	
24 October	"Barbie Girl"	Aqua	
31 October	"Barbie Girl"	Aqua	
7 November	"Barbie Girl"	Aqua	(Note: Irish Independent (2023) lists "Barbie Girl" as the No. 1 song on 6 November 1997.)
14 November	"Barbie Girl"	Aqua	
21 November	"Good Looking Woman"	Dustin and Joe Dolan	
28 November	"Perfect Day"	Various Artists	
4 December	"Perfect Day"	Various Artists	
11 December	"Perfect Day"	Various Artists	
18 December	"Perfect Day"	Various Artists	
25 December	"Perfect Day"	Various Artists	

== See also ==
- 1997 in music
- List of artists who reached number one in Ireland
