= Gone (U2 song) =

Song by U2

from the album Pop
- Released: 3 March 1997
- Genre: Alternative rock
- Length: 4:26
- Label: Island
- Composer: U2
- Lyricists: Bono and the Edge
- Producer: Flood

"Gone" is a song by Irish rock band U2, and is the seventh track on their 1997 album, Pop. It is also included on their 2002 compilation album, The Best of 1990–2000, in a reworked version. A highlight of the PopMart Tour, it was often dedicated to Michael Hutchence during the final few months of the PopMart Tour and during the following Elevation Tour in 2001. Lead vocalist Bono frequently refers to it as one of his favorite songs of the band's. Guitarist the Edge has also stated he was very pleased with the "New Mix" of the song available on the 2002 compilation The Best of 1990–2000.

"Gone", along with several other tracks from Pop and the band's previous 1993 album Zooropa, were remixed and either dubbed "The New Mix" or "Mike Hedges Mix" to help fit in with the more instrumentally-conservative songs of the 2000 album All That You Can't Leave Behind. Some reviews of the Best of compilation, notably AllMusic's review singled out the remixes of Pop songs, calling "none improvements and all undermining the actual career arc of U2 in the '90s."

"Gone" was initially considered as a single. The video for the song that was included on the DVD bundled with The Best of 1990–2000 was taken from the 1998 concert film PopMart: Live from Mexico City.

== Live ==
"Gone" was played at all PopMart Tour concerts in 1997 and 1998 and was also one of a few Pop songs that showed up during the band's following Elevation Tour in 2001. During PopMart it was regularly played in the first 5 songs, normally 3rd after "I Will Follow", while it was performed after "Kite" during the Elevation Tour. In PopMart shows, Bono would say "Hutch, going, going, but not gone." and in Elevation Tour shows, Bono would yell "Hutch!" in dedication to Michael Hutchence. "Gone" is also performed on the Elevation 2001: Live from Boston live video release, most notably as showing the Edge smashing his guitar at the end of the song out of frustration.

The Edge used a Rickenbacker 330-12 when performing this song live, and is accompanied by Bono using a Gretsch guitar. In live performances, the Edge would sing backing vocals "down" during Bono's "I'm not coming down" verses. This however was present during the second and third choruses on the mix used on The Best of 1990–2000.

Since being performed during the band's first concert in Glasgow towards the end of the Elevation Tour's European leg on August 28, 2001, this song has not been performed live by the band.
