= Mofo (song) =

- CD single cover

Single by U2

from the album Pop
- Released: 8 December 1997
- Genre: Techno; dance-rock
- Length: 5:49
- Label: Island
- Composer(s): U2
- Lyricist(s): Bono; The Edge
- Producer(s): Flood

U2 singles chronology
"If God Will Send His Angels" (1997)	"Mofo" (1997)	"Sweetest Thing" (1998)

Music video
- "Mofo (Phunk Phorce Mix)" on YouTube

"Mofo" is a song by Irish rock band U2. It is the third track on their 1997 album Pop, and was released as the album's final single on 8 December 1997. The song was partially written about lead vocalist Bono's mother, who died when he was 14 years old. Other songs which Bono wrote about his mother include "Lemon", "I Will Follow", "Iris (Hold Me Close)" and "Tomorrow".

"Mofo" opened every concert from the 1997–1998 PopMart Tour. It appears in the concert film PopMart: Live from Mexico City and also on Hasta la Vista Baby!, a live album from the same show.

British electronica band Underworld also recorded a remix that was never released.

== Recording and composition ==
"Mofo" originated from a songwriting trip that guitarist the Edge and lead vocalist Bono took to Nice, France, before U2 began the recording sessions for Pop. The song originally had a blues feeling to it, with Bono playing wah-wah guitar, but it evolved after the band began working on it in the studio and bassist Adam Clayton added a bassline in the style of Motown. Producer Flood said that it was a relatively traditional R&B song at that stage. As the lyrics began to take shape, the band felt that they needed to make the music tougher to "capture a kind of rage as well as the inherent sexiness of rock 'n' roll". Flood thought that the song had more potential and advocated for them to "go further". The group spent months working on it before Bono said "Let's give it one more night", at which point they told Flood, "let's hip-hop it, let's strip it back, let's get a beat together, let's see where it goes". Flood and producer Howie B subsequently spent a weekend deconstructing the song. As Flood described, "Howie B was acting the maverick, playing different ideas to [U2] for feel and rhythm and they had to take it on from there." Flood singled "Mofo" out as the song from Pop on which he had the greatest influence. The resulting changes pushed the song into a more techno direction reminiscent of music by Underworld or the Prodigy. Producer Steve Osborne also contributed a "blaring" Moog synthesizer part, against which drummer Larry Mullen Jr. was able to create rhythms.

"Mofo" features a "divebombing-jet" guitar sound that the band dubbed the "747". Flood said it was named as such because it resembled a "ridiculous jet plane taking off and going absolutely mad". The Edge achieved the sound with several effects units and a creative signal chain; a Korg SDD delay pedal was fed into several distortion pedals, one of which was a Fuzz Face, which then fed into a DigiTech Whammy pitch shifting pedal. Whereas most songs on the album featured Clayton playing bass guitar with a heavily processed sound, most of the bassline on "Mofo" was played on a keyboard bass. The song also features vocal and guitar samples made by the band and then played back by the Edge on a keyboard. Some guitar parts on the song were processed through an ARP 2600 synthesiser.

By the time the final version of "Mofo" created, the band had scaled back their experimentation by removing loops and any electronic percussion from the song so that it anchored on one drum performance by Mullen that was "layered on top of some of the elements of a more techno arrangement". The Edge said that this creative process was a microcosm of how Pop was written and recorded. During the album's mastering in New York in November 1996, Flood created the final mix of "Mofo" by editing together segments of three separate mixes of the song on half-inch tape. Flood eschewed digital editing, describing himself as a "bit of a diehard analogue fan".

== Critical reception ==
Andrew Unterberger of Stylus Magazine considers the song to be "the only legitimate evidence" of U2's supposed dance-orientated direction on the album. He said the song was "Underworld-esque house frenzy."

== Music video ==
A promotional video directed by Maurice Linnane was created for "Mofo"; using an edited version of the Phunk Force mix, it consists of footage from the PopMart Tour, including screen visuals. The video was later released on The Best of 1990–2000 DVD.

== Track listings ==
=== CD release ===
All lyrics are written by Bono and The Edge; all music is composed by U2

No.	Title	Remixed by	Length
1.	"Mofo" (Phunk Phorce mix)	Matthew Roberts	8:43
2.	"Mofo" (Mother's mix)	Roni Size	8:56
3.	"If God Will Send His Angels" (Grand Jury mix)	Gerald Baillergeau (aka Big Yam) and Victor Merritt (aka Vino)	5:40

=== 12-inch release ===
All lyrics are written by Bono and The Edge; all music is composed by U2

Side A
No.	Title	Remixed by	Length
1.	"Mofo" (Phunk Phorce mix)	Matthew Roberts	8:43
2.	"Mofo" (Black Hole dub)	Matthew Roberts	6:45

Side AA
No.	Title	Remixed by	Length
1.	"Mofo" (Mother's mix)	Roni Size	8:56
2.	"Mofo" (House Flavour mix)	Roni Size	7:16
3.	"Mofo" (Romin mix)	Johnny Moy	5:50

== Charts ==
Chart (1998)	Peak position
Australia (ARIA)	35
Italy (Musica e dischi) Remix	23
