= If God Will Send His Angels =

1997 single by U2

Single by U2

from the album Pop and City of Angels: Music from the Motion Picture
- B-side: "Slow Dancing"; "Two Shots of Happy, One Shot of Sad"
- Released: 8 December 1997
- Genre: Alternative rock, pop rock
- Length: 5:22 (album version); 4:32 (single version)
- Label: Island; Warner Bros.
- Composer: U2
- Lyricists: Bono; the Edge
- Producers: Flood; Howie B; Steve Osborne (single version only)

U2 singles chronology
| "Please" (1997) | "If God Will Send His Angels" (1997) | "Mofo" (1997) |

Music video
- "If God Will Send His Angels" on YouTube

"If God Will Send His Angels" is a song by Irish rock band U2. It is the fourth track on their 1997 album Pop and was released as its fifth single on 8 December 1997. It was also included on the City of Angels soundtrack.

== B-sides ==
The "If God Will Send His Angels" singles were backed with the following B-sides:

=== "Slow Dancing" ===
"Slow Dancing" is a country song written by Bono for Willie Nelson in 1989. Its first release was on a 1993 single, "Stay (Faraway, So Close!)", and performed solely by Bono and the Edge. In 1997, U2 had the opportunity to record it with Nelson. This version features the entire band, in addition to vocals by Nelson and harmonica by Mickey Raphael. Bono and Brian Eno provide backing vocals.

=== "Two Shots of Happy, One Shot of Sad" ===
This song was written by Bono and the Edge for Frank Sinatra in 1992. It is a jazzy lounge song written in the style of Sinatra's music. This performance was recorded live by Bono and the Edge in a London studio for Sinatra's 80th birthday. It was played for Sinatra in the United States at a televised birthday tribute on 19 November 1995 and was likely recorded a few days earlier. It has a string arrangement by Craig Armstrong.

Although Frank Sinatra never got a chance to record it himself, his daughter Nancy Sinatra cut a version for her 2004 album Nancy Sinatra. U2's Adam Clayton and Larry Mullen Jr. play bass and drums respectively for the track (they did not appear on the original recording). Sinatra changes the pronouns in the lyrics from a first-person perspective to a third-person, presumably to refer to her father.

Canadian singer Matt Dusk recorded the song for his album Two Shots.

=== "Sunday Bloody Sunday (Live from Sarajevo)" ===
The performance of "Sunday Bloody Sunday" was recorded live at the band's PopMart show at Sarajevo, Bosnia-Herzegovina on 23 September 1997. Because Bono lost his voice early in the show, guitarist the Edge sang the song, accompanied only by his guitar. It is a quiet, pensive performance of the song, a stark contrast from the fiery original on War.

This was the first time the song was performed this way, replacing Edge's nightly karaoke song in the set (with the exception of the immediately subsequent shows in Thessaloniki, Greece and Tel Aviv, Israel, this set list change would continue until the end of the PopMart tour).

=== "Mofo (Romin Mix)" ===
This version of the song was remixed by Johnny Moy.

== Alternative versions ==
There are four versions of this song:

- The album version, which appears on Pop. This is the original and the longest version of the song.
- The single version, which appears on the single, the City of Angels soundtrack, and the music video. Its choruses are arranged in the opposite order (moving the climax nearer to the end of the song), and it has a different ending (with actual lyrics replacing the scat singing of the original), shortening the track by 50 seconds.
- The "Big Yam Mix" (also known as the "Grand Jury Mix"), a remix of the song that appears on the "Mofo" single as well as the B-sides disc of The Best of 1990–2000.
- A re-recorded, stripped-down and acoustic version of the song that appears on Songs of Surrender.

== Music video ==
The song was promoted with a music video directed by Phil Joanou. The video takes place at the former Hi-Liter Diner in Highland Park, MI. The screen is split horizontally, showing Bono in the top half and the person sitting across from him in the bottom half. The lighting brightly lights up each person's face (in contrast to the dim backgrounds). As Bono sings the song, numerous different people sit down at his table, talk for a while, and leave (including the three other members of the band at one point).

The video was filmed at a slower speed and sped up; thus, Bono had to learn how to sing the song slowly in order to properly synchronize with the song. The other people in the video spoke and moved at regular speed, so they appear sped up in the video.

The video appears on the DVD for The Best of 1990–2000, along with director's commentary.

An alternate cut of the video, in which scenes from the movie City of Angels are interspliced, was also released.

== Live performances ==
"If God Will Send His Angels" was performed solely on the PopMart Tour at 23 of the 35 shows on the tour's first leg. It debuted at the tour's first show, on 25 April 1997 in Las Vegas, and segued out of "Until the End of the World". This was the only time the full band played the song. All 22 subsequent performances were played just by Bono and the Edge, though the segue out of "Until the End of the World" was retained. Its last performance was on 27 June 1997 in Chicago and it was replaced by "New Year's Day" the next night.

A chocolate advent calendar was distributed to promote the single.

== Formats and track listings ==
All tracks performed by U2, except "Slow Dancing" by U2 featuring Willie Nelson, and "Sunday Bloody Sunday" by the Edge.

CD (572 189-2)
| No. | Title | Lyrics | Music | Producer | Length |
|---|---|---|---|---|---|
| 1. | "If God Will Send His Angels" (Single version) | Bono and the Edge | U2 | Flood, Howie B, and Steve Osborne | 4:32 |
| 2. | "Slow Dancing" | Bono and the Edge | U2 | Flood | 4:00 |
| 3. | "Two Shots of Happy, One Shot of Sad" | Bono | Bono and the Edge | Nellee Hooper | 4:12 |
| 4. | "Sunday Bloody Sunday" (Live in Sarajevo, Bosnia, 23 September 1997) | U2 | U2 | Chris Lycett | 3:50 |

Cassette (572 188-4) and CD (572 190-2)
| No. | Title | Lyrics | Music | Producer | Length |
|---|---|---|---|---|---|
| 1. | "If God Will Send His Angels" (single version) | Bono and the Edge | U2 | Flood, Howie B, Steve Osborne | 4:32 |
| 2. | "Mofo" (Romin mix) | Bono and the Edge | U2 | Flood, Johnny Moy | 5:50 |

== Charts ==
=== Weekly charts ===
Weekly chart performance for "If God Will Send His Angels"
| Chart (1997–1998) | Peak position |
|---|---|
| Belgium (Ultratip Bubbling Under Flanders) | 4 |
| Canada (Nielsen SoundScan) | 26 |
| Finland (Suomen virallinen lista) | 6 |
| Iceland (Íslenski Listinn Topp 40) | 4 |
| Ireland (IRMA) | 11 |
| Italy (Musica e dischi) | 10 |
| Netherlands (Dutch Top 40) | 30 |
| Netherlands (Single Top 100) | 24 |
| New Zealand (Recorded Music NZ) | 35 |
| Scottish Singles Sales (Official Charts) | 9 |
| Spain (AFYVE) | 5 |
| Sweden (Sverigetopplistan) | 56 |
| UK Singles (Official Charts) | 12 |

=== Year-end charts ===
2001 year-end chart performance for "If God Will Send His Angels"
| Chart (2001) | Position |
|---|---|
| Canada (Nielsen SoundScan) | 97 |

2002 year-end chart performance for "If God Will Send His Angels"
| Chart (2002) | Position |
|---|---|
| Canada (Nielsen SoundScan) | 129 |

== Release history ==
Release dates and formats for "If God Will Send His Angels"
| Region | Date | Format(s) | Label(s) | Ref. |
|---|---|---|---|---|
| United Kingdom | 8 December 1997 | CD; cassette | Island | |
| Canada | 9 December 1997 | CD | Island | |
| United States | 2 March 1998 | Contemporary hit radio | Island | |
| United States | 8 April 1998 | CD; cassette | Island | |

== See also ==
- List of covers of U2 songs - If God Will Send His Angels
