= Discothèque (song) =

1997 single by U2

Single by U2

from the album Pop
- B-side: "Holy Joe"
- Released: 3 February 1997
- Genre: Electronica; dance-rock
- Length: 5:19 (album version); 4:34 (radio edit); 5:08 (12-inch version)
- Label: Island
- Composer: U2
- Lyricists: Bono and The Edge
- Producer: Flood

U2 singles chronology
"Miss Sarajevo" (1995)	"Discothèque" (1997)	"Staring at the Sun" (1997)

Music video
- "Discothèque" on YouTube

Alternative cover

"Discothèque" is a song by Irish rock band U2. It is the opening track on their 1997 album, Pop, and was released as its lead single on 3 February 1997 by Island Records. The song exhibits influences from electronic dance music, characteristic of the band's musical direction in the 1990s. The music video, directed by Stéphane Sednaoui, was set inside of a mirrorball and featured the band members dressed as members of the disco group the Village People.

"Discothèque" peaked at number one in several countries, including Finland, Ireland, Israel, Italy, New Zealand, Norway and the United Kingdom, and it also reached number one on the American and Canadian dance and alternative charts.

== Release history ==
A 30-second sample of "Discothèque" was leaked to the Internet on 26 October 1996. By 27 December, the entire track had been leaked, after which U2 moved the release date forward. "Discothèque" debuted at number three on the US Modern Rock Tracks chart and reached number one the following week. It was certified Gold by the Recording Industry Association of America (RIAA) on 7 April 1997. The song debuted on the Billboard Hot 100 at number 10 but dropped off the charts after only four weeks in the top 40, becoming the band's sixth and most-recent top-10 single in the US. The track debuted at number one on the UK Singles Chart, remaining on top for one week and spending 11 weeks in the chart.

The song was remixed for U2's The Best of 1990–2000 greatest hits album, released in 2002. The new version has a longer intro and subtle use of the techno-sounding drum beat that figured prominently in the opening of the original track. The new "Discothèque" sounds similar to the way U2 performed the song during the PopMart Tour in 1997 and 1998.

The version on most versions of the single was the 12-inch version, which altered the introduction's instrumentation and vocals. It was also slightly shorter than the album version.

== Reception ==
U2 were criticised by some reviewers for the large number of dance music remixes of the song, suggesting that it was an attempt to "jump on the dance (music) bandwagon." However, Stephen Thomas believed it to be indicative of the growing influence of remixes in music. Larry Flick from Billboard magazine wrote, "Twenty seconds into this playfully experimental single, and you'll find it hard to remember that this is the same band that recorded 'Sunday Bloody Sunday'." He said that the song "wriggles and writhes with tripped-out techno-funk intensity" and that the hook "sneaks up on you while you are twitching to the percolating dance beat or snarfing up the tasty guitar scratching offered by the Edge". Flick concluded, "'Discotheque' may start its life at modern rock radio and in clubs, but it sure does sound like the kind of fun and unique record that top 40 desperately needs." Kevin Courtney from Irish Times commented, "U2's much-touted "dance influences" are right to the fore here, with Larry's drums laying down a strident beat reminiscent of 'The Fly', and The Edge mixing distorted guitars with crazy compressed electronic effects. Bono's disembodied, doubled-up voice squeezes into the cyber-spaces, sounding frazzled and frantic at first, then going all grungy and growling. The atmosphere is one of taut stretched out tension as though the song was being pulled apart in four different directions, but then everything suddenly goes slack, resolving into a fluid, delayed-effect guitar lick by the Edge."

Dominic Pride from Music & Media commented, "Bono and the boys continue their historical process of deconstructing—and reconstructing—rock music, fusing a trippy beat with their trademark chattering guitars and a clear, echoing lead hook." He added, "This time around, Bono's vocals lie farther back in the mix than in the past, and anyone expecting a traditional verse and chorus structure will struggle to find it here. Not, of course, that this will stop most radio formats embracing this from day one." A reviewer from Music Week gave it a full score of five out of five, declaring it as a "stunning new single which, echoing the spirit of 'The Fly', sees producer Flood successfully combining an electronic-sounding Bono vocal with a dark, yet undeniably funky backing." David Sinclair from The Times wrote that the Irish superstars "make a bullish and overdue return to the fray with an impressively noisy groove."

Commercials for the 2003 Toyota Matrix used the Hexadecimal remix. In a 2006 article by Stylus, the magazine had trouble trying to classify the genre of the song, calling it "sheer WTFery" and "permanently unclassifiable".

== Music video ==
In the accompanying music video for "Discothèque", which was directed by the Frenchman Stéphane Sednaoui, the band performed in what seemed like the inside of a mirrorball. They alluded to several elements of the disco era, including disco-style dancing and the film Saturday Night Fever. U2 further and directly alluded to the Village People, a popular disco era band, by similarly adopting the guises of various professions: a motorcycle police officer (Bono), a gay-fetish biker (the Edge), an American sailor (Adam Clayton) and a cowboy (Larry Mullen Jr.). Stylus magazine described the video as "sublimely bizarre". Prior to the video's debut on MTV, the channel aired a 24-hour marathon of 13 U2 music videos.

== Live performances ==
The song was performed at every show on the PopMart Tour. It opened the encore and was followed by "If You Wear That Velvet Dress" (bar three shows). A somewhat abbreviated form of "Discothèque" was played during the first two legs of U2's Elevation Tour in 2001, normally containing the snippets of "Staring at the Sun" and INXS's "Devil Inside". A more rock-sounding version of the song was played twice on the Vertigo Tour accompanied by an elaborate stage lightshow. It has not been played in full since 20 September 2005. In the 2010 European leg of the U2 360° Tour, the band began performing an extended snippet of Discothèque during their remixed version of "I'll Go Crazy If I Don't Go Crazy Tonight", with Bono singing several verses of the song during the intro and the outtro, and Edge mixing its guitar riff in at the end.

== Track listings ==
- UK and European CD single
1. "Discothèque" – 5:08
2. "Holy Joe" (Garage Mix) – 4:21
3. "Holy Joe" (Guilty Mix) – 5:09
- US 12-inch single

A1. "Discothèque" (DM Deep Club Mix) – 6:58
A2. "Discothèque" (Hexidecimal Mix) – 7:21
B1. "Discothèque" (DM Deep Instrumental Mix) – 6:58
B2. "Discothèque" (radio edit) – 4:34

== Personnel ==
- Bono – vocals
- The Edge – guitar, backing vocals
- Adam Clayton – bass guitar
- Larry Mullen Jr. – drums, percussion

== Charts ==
=== Weekly charts ===
Chart (1997)	Peak position
Australia (ARIA)	3
Austria (Ö3 Austria Top 40)	9
Belgium (Ultratop 50 Flanders)	14
Belgium (Ultratop 50 Wallonia)	5
Canada (Nielsen SoundScan)	1
Canada Top Singles (RPM)	2
Canada Dance/Urban (RPM)	1
Canada Rock/Alternative (RPM)	1
Czech Republic (IFPI CR)	2
Denmark (IFPI)	4
Europe (Eurochart Hot 100)	3
Europe Airplay (European Radio Top 50)	2
Finland (Suomen virallinen lista)	1
France (SNEP)	12
Germany (GfK)	9
Hungary (Mahasz)	3
Iceland (Íslenski Listinn Topp 40)	2
Ireland (IRMA)	1
Israel (Israeli Singles Chart)	1
Italy (Musica e dischi)	1
Italy Airplay (Music & Media)	1
Netherlands (Dutch Top 40)	9
Netherlands (Single Top 100)	6
New Zealand (Recorded Music NZ)	1
Norway (VG-lista)	1
Scottish Singles Sales (Official Charts)	1
Sweden (Sverigetopplistan)	2
Switzerland (Schweizer Hitparade)	6
UK Singles (Official Charts)	1
US Billboard Hot 100	10
US Adult Alternative Airplay (Billboard)	7
US Alternative Airplay (Billboard)	1
US Dance Club Songs (Billboard)	1
US Dance Singles Sales (Billboard)	1
US Mainstream Rock (Billboard)	6
US Pop Airplay (Billboard)	40

=== Year-end charts ===
Chart (1997)	Position
Australia (ARIA)	97
Canada Top Singles (RPM)	17
Canada Dance/Urban (RPM)	2
Canada Rock/Alternative (RPM)	3
Europe (Eurochart Hot 100)	41
Iceland (Íslenski Listinn Topp 40)	19
Israel (Israeli Singles Chart)	18
Romania (Romanian Top 100)	33
Sweden (Topplistan)	65
UK Singles (OCC)	55
US Dance Club Play (Billboard)	8
US Mainstream Rock Tracks (Billboard)	64
US Maxi-Singles Sales (Billboard)	27
US Modern Rock Tracks (Billboard)	52

== Certifications ==
Region	Certification	Certified units/sales
Australia (ARIA)	Platinum	70,000^{^}
United Kingdom (BPI)	Silver	200,000^{^}
United States (RIAA)	Gold	500,000^{^}
^{^} Shipments figures based on certification alone.

== Release history ==
Region	Date	Format(s)	Label(s)	Ref(s).
United States	7 January 1997	Radio	Island	
Europe	3 February 1997	CD	Island	
Japan	3 February 1997	CD	Island	
United Kingdom	3 February 1997	CD; cassette	Island	
United States	4 February 1997	7-inch vinyl; 12-inch vinyl; CD; cassette	Island	
Canada	11 February 1997	CD	Island	
United Kingdom	17 February 1997	12-inch vinyl	Island	
United Kingdom	17 March 1997	3×12-inch vinyl	Island	
Japan	26 March 1997	Remix CD	Island	

== See also ==
- List of covers of U2 songs - Discothèque
- List of RPM Rock/Alternative number-one singles (Canada)
- List of number-one dance singles of 1997 (U.S.)
- List of number-one singles of 1997 (Ireland)
- List of number-one singles in 1997 (New Zealand)
- List of number-one singles from the 1990s (UK)
- List of number-one modern rock hits (United States)
- Number one modern rock hits of 1997
