= Zoo TV Tour =

1992–93 concert tour by U2

- World tour by U2
- Location: North America; Europe; Oceania; Asia
- Associated albums: Achtung Baby; Zooropa
- Start date: 29 February 1992
- End date: 10 December 1993
- Legs: 5
- No. of shows: 157 (Note: Sources give varying concert totals for the tour. This discrepancy stems from a 7 August 1992 show, which was a dress rehearsal for the 3rd leg but featured a paying audience. The band's website includes it on their Zoo TV Tour page, but U2 concert fan site U2Gigs.com excludes it from their 156-show count. According to Bill Flanagan's book U2 at the End of the World, the tour crew counted 157 shows. According to John Jobling's book U2: The Definitive Biography, the tour comprised 157 shows. For purposes of completeness, the higher 157-show total is listed in this article.)
- Attendance: 5.3 million
- Box office: US$151 million

U2 concert chronology
- Lovetown Tour (1989–1990); Zoo TV Tour (1992–1993); PopMart Tour (1997–1998)

The Zoo TV Tour (also written as ZooTV, ZOO TV or ZOOTV) was a worldwide concert tour by the Irish rock band U2. Comprising five legs and 157 shows, the tour supported their 1991 album Achtung Baby and later their 1993 album Zooropa, visiting arenas and stadiums from 1992 to 1993. Intended to mirror the group's new musical direction on Achtung Baby, the Zoo TV Tour departed from their previously austere stage setups by providing an elaborately staged multimedia spectacle, satirising television and media oversaturation by attempting to instill "sensory overload" in the audience. To escape their reputation for being earnest and over-serious, U2 embraced a more lighthearted and self-deprecating image on tour. Zoo TV and Achtung Baby were central to the group's 1990s reinvention.

The tour's concept was inspired by disparate television programming, coverage of the Gulf War, the desensitising effect of mass media, and "morning zoo" radio shows. The stages featured dozens of large video screens that showed sampled video clips, live television, and flashing text phrases, along with a lighting system partially made of Trabant automobiles. The shows incorporated channel surfing, prank calls, video confessionals, a belly dancer, and live satellite transmissions from war-torn Sarajevo. On stage, Bono portrayed several characters he conceived, including the leather-clad egomaniac "The Fly", the greedy televangelist "Mirror Ball Man", and the devilish "MacPhisto". Contrasting with other U2 tours, each of the Zoo TV shows opened with six to eight consecutive new songs before older material was played.

The tour began in Lakeland, Florida, on 29 February 1992 and ended in Tokyo, Japan, on 10 December 1993. It alternated between North America and Europe for the first four legs before visiting Oceania and Japan. After two arena legs, the show's production was expanded for stadiums for the final three legs, which were branded "Outside Broadcast", "Zooropa", and "Zoomerang/New Zooland", respectively. Although the tour provoked a range of reactions from music critics, it was generally well received. It was the highest-grossing North American tour of 1992, and overall it grossed US$151 million (equivalent to about $337 million today) from 5.3 million tickets sold. The band's 1993 album Zooropa, recorded during a break in the tour, expanded on Zoo TV's mass media themes. The tour was depicted in the Grammy Award-winning 1994 concert film Zoo TV: Live from Sydney. Critics regard the Zoo TV Tour as one of rock's most memorable and influential tours.

== Background ==
U2's 1987 album The Joshua Tree and the supporting Joshua Tree Tour brought them to a new level of commercial and critical success, particularly in the United States. Like their previous tours, the Joshua Tree Tour was a minimalistic, austere production, and they used this outlet for addressing political and social concerns. As a result, the band earned a reputation for being earnest and serious, an image that became a target for derision after their much-maligned 1988 motion picture and companion album Rattle and Hum, which documented their exploration of American roots music. The project was criticised as being "pretentious", and "misguided and bombastic", and U2 were accused of being grandiose and self-righteous. Their 1989–1990 Lovetown Tour did not visit the United States. With a sense of musical stagnation, lead vocalist Bono hinted at changes to come for the band during a 30 December 1989 concert near the end of the tour; before a hometown crowd in Dublin, he said on stage that it was "the end of something for U2" and that they had to "go away and ... just dream it all up again".

== Conception ==
... I sort of took the overview position of saying, 'What do you want? You don't want a stage show where everything fits neatly into place and it's all nicely organized and people know exactly where the center of attention is at all moments.' That isn't what the music is about now, and it certainly isn't what this concept of a new Europe is about, so how can we make a stage show that has some of the feeling of defensiveness and chaos and information overload ...?

— Brian Eno, on asking U2 about their plans for concerts

One of U2's inspirations for Zoo TV was a 1989 concert in Dublin that reached a radio audience of 500 million people and was widely bootlegged. Bono said the group were fascinated with the possibilities of radio and how they could be expanded using video to "beam concerts into Peking or Prague for free" or spawn "video bootlegs in cultures where it's hard to get [U2's] music". The wild antics of "morning zoo" radio programmes inspired the band with the notion of taking a pirate television station on tour. They were also interested in using video as a way of making themselves less accessible to their audiences. The band developed these ideas while recording Achtung Baby in Berlin at Hansa Studios. While in Germany, they watched television coverage of the Gulf War on Sky News, which was the only English programming available at their hotel. When they were tired of hearing about the conflict, they tuned into local programming to see "bad German soap operas" and automobile advertisements. The band believed that cable television had blurred the lines between news, entertainment, and home shopping over the previous decade, and they wanted to represent this on their next tour.

The juxtaposition of such disparate programming inspired U2 and Achtung Baby co-producer Brian Eno to conceive an "audio-visual show" that would display a rapidly changing mix of live and pre-recorded video on monitors. The idea was intended to mock the desensitising effect of mass media. Eno, who was credited in the tour programme for the "Video Staging Concept", explained his vision for the tour: "the idea to make a stage set with a lot of different video sources was mine, to make a chaos of uncoordinated material happening together ... The idea of getting away from video being a way of helping people to see the band more easily ... this is video as a way of obscuring them, losing them sometimes in just a network of material."

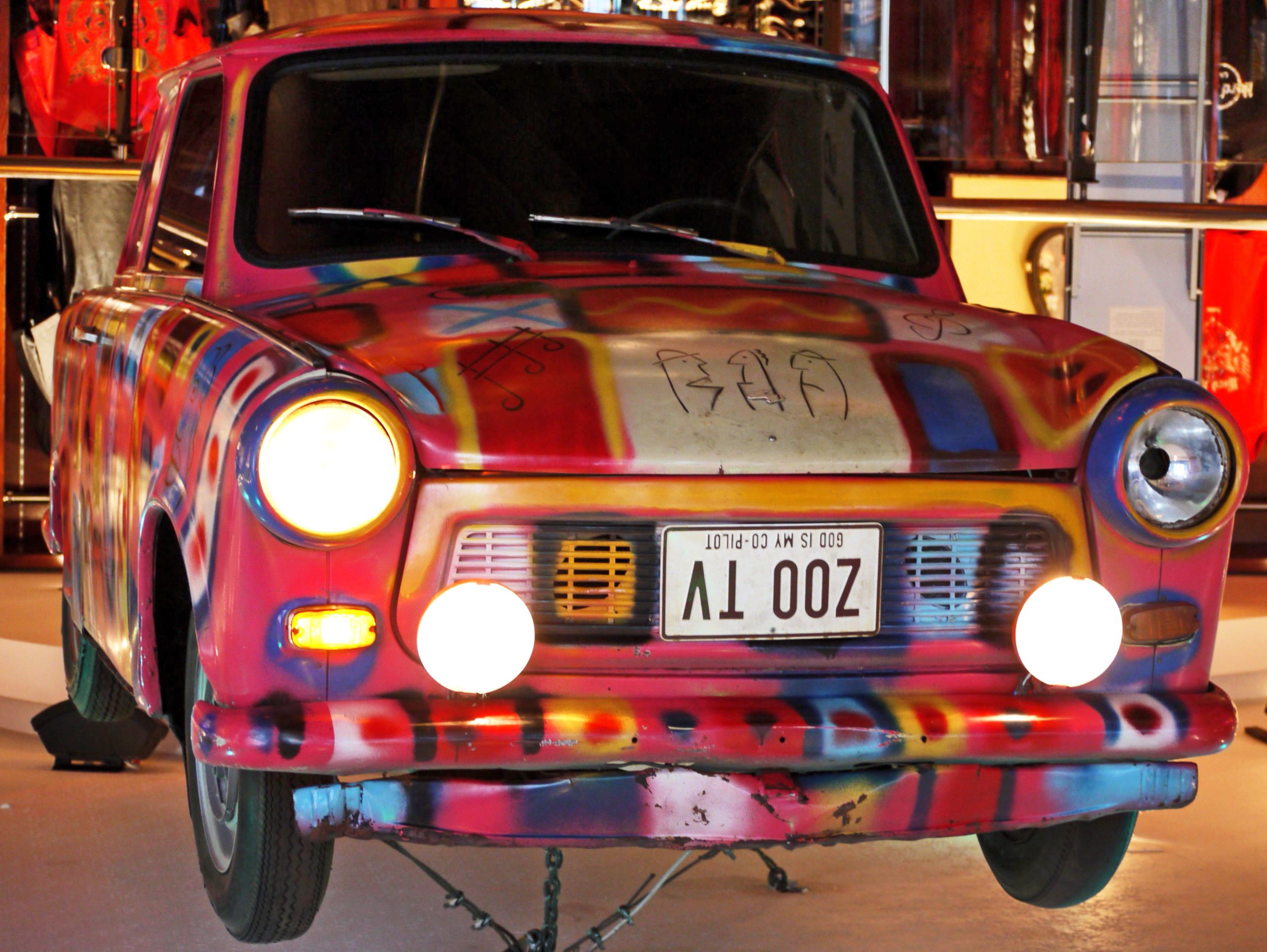
U2's interest in Trabants while recording Achtung Baby in Germany inspired tour designer Willie Williams to use them as lighting fixtures on the tour and to paint them.

While on a break from recording, the band invited production designer Willie Williams to join them in Tenerife in February 1991. Williams had recently worked on David Bowie's Sound+Vision Tour, which used film projection and video content, and he was keen to "take rock show video to a level as yet undreamed of". The band played Williams some of their new music—inspired by alternative rock, industrial music, and electronic dance music—and they told him about the "Zoo TV" phrase that Bono liked. Williams also learned about the band's affection for the Trabant, an East German automobile that derisively became a symbol for the fall of Communism; he thought their fondness for the car was "deeply, deeply bizarre". In May, he brainstormed the idea to construct a lighting system of recycled Trabants. Williams, who "always favored a very homemade approach to lighting, over an off-the-shelf one", had previously fashioned fixtures from objects such as trash cans and furniture. He saw the Trabant as the perfect object to light U2's tour, envisioning it as a "suitably surreal and symbolic scenic element". On 1 June 1991, Williams visited the engineering department of Light & Sound Design (LSD) in Birmingham, England, to ask for help with building a prototype.

On 14 June, the first tour production meeting was held; in attendance were Williams, the band, their manager Paul McGuinness, artist Catherine Owens, and production managers Steve Iredale and Jake Kennedy. Williams presented his ideas, which included the Trabant lighting system and the placement of video monitors all over the stage; both notions were well received. Eno's original idea was to have the video screens on wheels and constantly in motion, although this was impractical. Williams and the group proposed many ideas that did not make it to the final stage design. One such proposal, dubbed "Motorway Madness", would have placed billboards advertising real products across the stage, similar to their placement beside highways. The idea was intended to be ironic, but was ultimately scrapped out of fear that the band would be accused of selling out. Another proposed idea was to build a giant doll of an "achtung baby", complete with an inflatable penis that would spray on the audience, but it was deemed too expensive and was abandoned.

By August, a prototype of a single Trabant for the lighting system was completed, with the innards gutted and retrofitted with lighting equipment, and a paint job on the exterior. Williams spent most of the second half of 1991 designing the stage. Owens was insistent that her ideas be given priority, as she thought that men had been making all of U2's creative decisions and were using male-centred designs. With the support of bassist Adam Clayton, she recruited visual artists from Europe and the United States to arrange images that would be used on the display screens. These people included video artist Mark Pellington, photo/conceptual artist David Wojnarowicz, and satirical group Emergency Broadcast Network, who digitally manipulate sampled image and sound. Pellington conceived the idea to flash text phrases on the visual displays, inspired by his collaborations with artists Jenny Holzer and Barbara Kruger. The concept was first put into practice in the video for Achtung Baby's lead single, "The Fly". Bono devised and collected numerous phrases during development of the album and the tour. Additional pre-recorded video content was created by Eno, Williams, Kevin Godley, Carol Dodds, and Philip Owens.

On 13 November, U2 settled on the "Zoo TV Tour" name and the plans to place video screens across the stage and build a lighting system out of Trabants. McGuinness led a trip to East Germany to buy Trabants from a recently closed factory in Chemnitz, and in January 1992, Catherine Owens began to paint the cars. As she described, "The basic idea was that the imagery on the cars should have nothing to do with the car itself." One such design was the "fertility car", which sported blown-up newspaper personal ads and a drawing of a woman giving birth while holding string tied to her husband's testicles. Williams and Chilean artist Rene Castro also provided artwork for the cars.

== Stage design and show production ==
We really wanted to do something that had never been seen before, using TV, text, and imagery. It was a very big and expensive project to put together. We allowed ourselves to be carried away by new technology.

— Larry Mullen Jr.

The Zoo TV stages were designed by Willie Williams, U2's stage designer since the War Tour of 1982–1983. In place of U2's austere and minimalist productions of the 1980s, the Zoo TV stage was a complex setup, designed to instill "sensory overload" in its audience. The set's giant video screens showed footage of the band members performing, pre-recorded video, live television transmissions, and flashing text phrases. Electronic, tabloid-style headlines ran on crawlers at the ends of the stage. The band's embracing of such technology was meant as a radical departure in form, and as a commentary on the pervasive nature of technology. This led many critics to describe the show as ironic.

To enable such a complex video production, the equivalent of a television studio control room was built for the tour. Williams enlisted Carol Dodds to be video director based on their experience together on Bowie's Sound+Vision Tour and her familiarity with Vidiwalls from a Paula Abdul tour. Dodds operated the tour's "custom-designed interactive video system", and oversaw a crew ranging from 12 people on the arena legs to 18 for the "Outside Broadcast" leg. At the front of house position, the video crew conducted a live mix of the broadcast cameras filming the concert and live television transmissions intercepted by a satellite dish. In the production facility underneath the stage, dubbed "Underworld", engineers intercut the video from the live mix with pre-recorded imagery from LaserDisc players, video tape players, and a Philips CD-i player and routed it to the display screens. In all, content was compiled from 24 different video sources.

Personal computers were used to sequence specific pre-recorded video segments and distribute them to the proper outputs; the engineers could select one or many displays to which to output each content source, whether it be a single video cube or an entire screen. The computers' media controls allowed video content from the disc and tape players, either individual frames or entire segments, to be sequenced, looped, and built into pre-programmed cues. On stage, guitarist the Edge used MIDI pedals to trigger music sequencers, generating SMPTE timecode for coordinating the video cues. Des Broadberry managed the keyboards, sequencers, samples, and MIDI equipment.

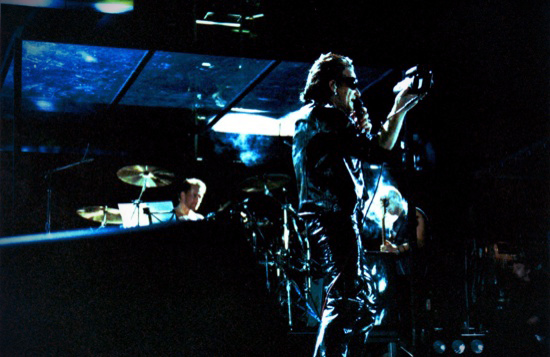
Bono filming himself with a video camera during a Melbourne concert in November 1993

Despite the production's complexity, the group decided that flexibility in the shows' length and content was a priority. The Edge said, "That was one of the more important decisions we made early on, that we wouldn't sacrifice flexibility, so we designed a system that is both extremely complicated and high-tech but also incredibly simple and hands-on, controlled by human beings ... in that sense, it's still a live performance." This flexibility allowed for improvisations and deviations from the planned programme. Eno recommended that U2 film their own video tapes so that they could be edited and looped on the video displays more easily, instead of relying entirely on pre-sequenced video. Eno explained: "their show depends on some kind of response to what's happening at the moment in that place. So if it turns out they want to do a song for five minutes longer, they can actually loop through the material again so that you're not suddenly stuck with black screens halfway through the fifth verse." The band shot new video for the displays over the course of the tour.

The set featured a B-stage, a smaller, secondary performance area that connected to the main stage via a catwalk. Zoo TV was U2's first tour to use a B-stage; the band had pursued the idea on previous tours because Bono wanted proximity to the audience, but they had been unsuccessful due to building and fire code restrictions.

Equipment for the sound system was provided by Clair Brothers Audio, which had been working with U2 since 1982. The company's S4 Series II speaker cabinet was the standard model used for Zoo TV; it was based on a prototype designed for the tour and featured built-in time-alignment. The sound engineers decided not to supplement the traditional public address system with delayed speakers for time-alignment, as they wanted the audience to focus their attention on the stage and the multimedia aspects of the show. The stage monitor system used on the Zoo TV Tour was one of the largest and most complex systems at the time. Through "quad monitoring", the monitor engineer used a joystick to pan each band member's mix around the monitor speakers to "follow" their movements on stage. The band members also wore in-ear monitors, which was necessitated by their performing on the B-stage, where they experienced an audio delay from the primary PA speakers behind them and where fewer monitor wedges could be positioned.

Lighting equipment was provided by LSD. Supplementing the traditional lighting rigs were several suspended Trabants that had been retrofitted with light fixtures. The cars were purchased for US$500–600 each, and when stripped of their interiors, they weighed 900 pounds (410 kg). Approximately US$10,000 of lighting equipment weighing 400 pounds (180 kg) was installed in the vehicles. A 2.5K HMI Fresnel fixture was mounted to the metal bar that previously held the vehicle's backseat, and was fitted with an LSD ColourMag colour magazine and a dowser; a 5K fixture was originally used but had to be replaced after causing the car to melt after five minutes. Other fixtures installed were: a PAR-64 Ray Light reflector in the headlight bracket; two LSD Mirrorstrobes; eight Molefays behind the front bumper and four behind the rear; and ACL strips behind the radiator grid. Chain hoists were attached to brackets welded onto the wheel hubs, allowing the vehicles to be raised and tilted on their own axles.

=== Arena legs ===
The first two legs of the tour in 1992 were indoors and used the smallest of the stages. The video system included four 8-foot (2.4 m) Philips Vidiwalls of video cubes, thirty-two 36-inch (910 mm) monitors, and a 16-by-20-foot (4.9 m × 6.1 m) projection screen center-hung from the front truss. The projection screen was used in lieu of an additional video cube wall that proved too costly; Williams called it the "first of many such compromises" during the tour. Dodds' video crew comprised 12 people: four camera operators, four staffers running computers in the front of house position, and four members underneath the stage controlling the video screens. Seven LaserDisc players were used. About 40 feet (12 m) of tracks were laid on top of the walkway to the B-stage for a camera dolly, which could reach a height of 12 feet (3.7 m).

For the arena lighting system, six Trabants were suspended above the stage, and a seventh Trabant by the B-stage doubled as a DJ booth and a mirror ball. Williams originally planned to use 12 cars but scaled back after the tour's video production expanded. The remainder of the lighting system was minimal, comprising 17 spotlights and a "couple of hundred" PAR cans. The ColourMags were controlled by LSD's Simon Carus-Wilson, who had worked with Williams on the Sound+Vision Tour. Two lighting trusses, used to illuminate the audience, were equipped with ACL wash fixtures for "little pools of light", eight fixtures to light the venue during the pre-show, and ultraviolet wash light. The video screens produced enough backlight that few other fixtures were needed for the opening two songs of the concerts. The lighting system was controlled with an Avolites QM180 console.

The North American arena shows, many of which featured in-the-round seating, used 72 Clair Brothers S4 Series II speakers, in positions of stage left and right, rear fill stage left and right, and left and right sidefill. For the European arena shows, the number of S4 Series II speakers was reduced to 56, as rear fill and sidefill audio were not required. Clair Brothers' P4 "Piston" cabinets were also used for nearfield/in-fill audio, with two clusters of six speakers each at stage left and right. Bass was provided by six Servo Drive Bass Tech 7 subwoofers. The sound was mixed by sound engineer Joe O'Herlihy and assistant Robbie Adams with an ATI Paragon console and a Clair Brothers CBA console, aided by an inventory of effects intended to replicate the ones used in the studio during the recording of Achtung Baby.

The stage monitor system was mixed underneath the stage with six consoles: two Harrison SM5s (with a 16-channel extender), a Yamaha DMP7, a Soundcraft 200B, and two Ramsa WS-840s for drummer Larry Mullen Jr. The consoles provided capabilities for around 200 audio channels. To avoid audio feedback during B-stage performances, O'Herlihy said, "We 'ring' the system out using a separate EQ". On stage, the monitor speakers consisted of Clair Brothers' 12AM single and double wedge units, with ML18 and MM4T units for sidefill. Steve McCale served as the monitor engineer for Bono, the Edge, and Clayton, and controlled the joystick panning, while Dave Skaff was Mullen's monitor engineer. In-ear monitors were provided by Future Sonics.

The production equipment was transported on 11 trucks supplied by Upstaging Trucking. The stage required 13–14 hours to build and 3–4 hours to disassemble. The crew of 75 people travelled on six buses, while the band flew in a chartered plane.

=== North American stadium leg ===
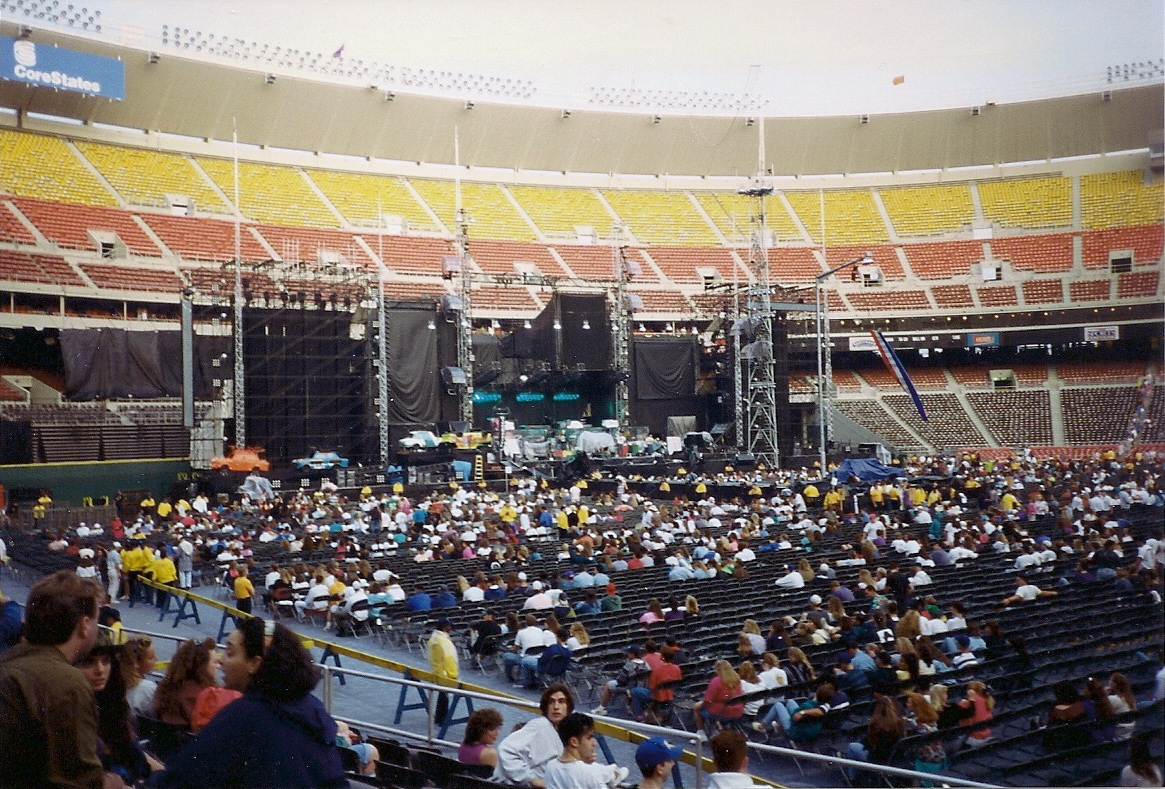
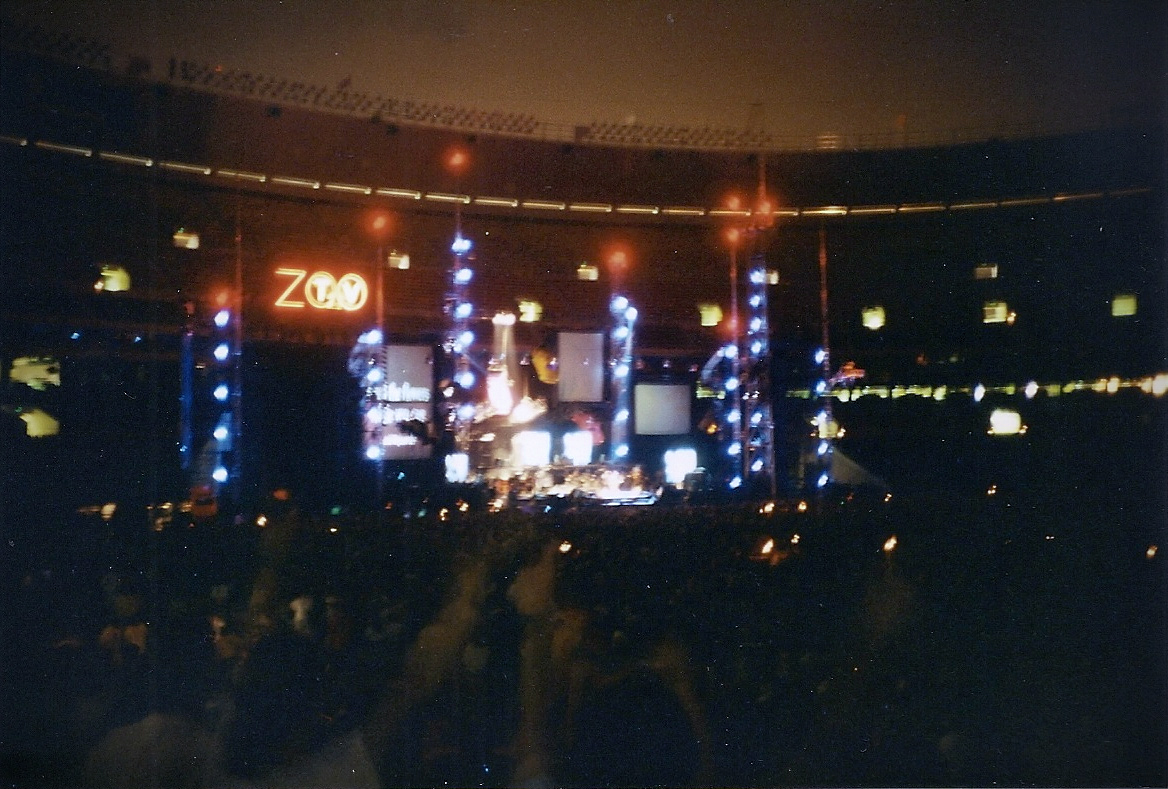
The "Outside Broadcast" version of the stage, before and during a Veterans Stadium concert in September 1992

To redesign the stage for the 1992 North American stadium leg—dubbed "Outside Broadcast"—Williams collaborated with stage designers Mark Fisher and Jonathan Park, both of whom had worked on the Steel Wheels Tour stage for the Rolling Stones. The main stage was expanded to be 248 by 80 feet (76 by 24 m), and the catwalk leading to the B-stage was lengthened to approximately 150 feet (46 m), nearly four times as long as the arena version. The spires of the stage, intended to resemble radio masts, reached as high as 110 feet (34 m), requiring aircraft warning lights approved by the Federal Aviation Administration to be placed on top of them. The stage's appearance was compared to the techno-future cityscapes from Blade Runner and the works of cyberpunk writer William Gibson.

The video projection system consisted of four Vidiwalls, four 15-by-20-foot (4.6 m × 6.1 m) rear projection screens using eighteen GE Talaria 5055 HB light valve projectors, and thirty-six 27-inch (690 mm) Barco monitors. The production control system, which was operated by Dodds and a crew of 18 people, included ten Pioneer LDV8000 LaserDisc players, two Sony Betacam SP BVW-75 tape decks, two Sony 9800 3/4-inch SP tape decks, four Ikegami HL-55A CCD cameras, two Sony Video8 Handycams (nicknamed "Bonocams"), and one point-of-view camera. The video equipment cost more than US$3.5 million.

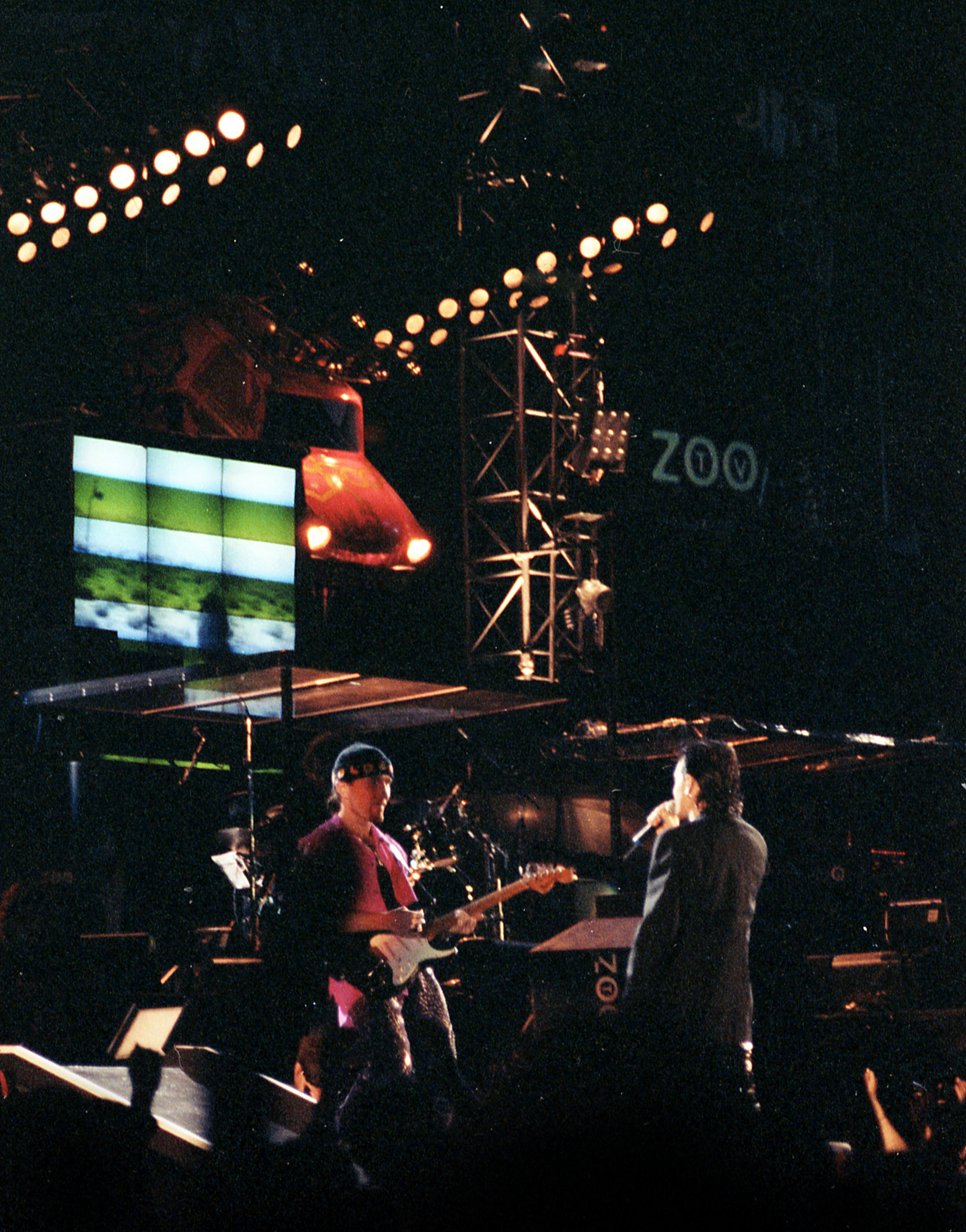
The Edge and Bono during an August 1992 show, with one of the Trabants from the lighting system visible behind them

Williams faced difficulties in designing the outdoor lighting system, as the stage did not have a roof. He settled on using the venues' house spotlights and strategically placing lights in the structure behind the band. About a third of the lighting equipment was lifted by a 100-foot (30 m) tower, requiring 25 short tons (23 t) of ballast. Lighting was also provided by 11 Trabants; two were suspended from cranes while the others were supported by a hydraulic system.

The audio system for the larger stage used 176 speaker enclosures containing 312 18-inch (46 cm) woofers, 592 10-inch (25 cm) mid-range drivers, and 604 high-frequency drivers. The system used about one million watts of power and weighed 60,000 pounds (27,000 kg). U2 were Clair Brothers' first client to use the company's nascent "flying" PA system, which designers were able to position behind the staging area. The front of house position featured three mixing stations, each with 40-channel capabilities. The stage monitor system used 60 speakers, which were mixed from two separate positions, each with two consoles providing 160-channel capacities. On stage, 26 microphones were used.

The North American stadium leg employed a 145-person production crew and 45-person staging crew that travelled on 12 buses and a 40-passenger chartered jet known as the Zoo Plane. Two separate steel sets were used during the tour; while one was in use for a concert, another was in transit to the next venue. The tour required 52 trucks to transport 2.4 million pounds (1.1 kt) of equipment—12 trucks for each of the two steel sets and 28 for the production equipment. The concerts were powered by four generators and 3 miles (4.8 km) of cabling. Stage construction required more than 200 local labourers, 12 forklifts, and a 120-foot-tall (37 m), 40-short-ton (36 t) crane. The million-dollar stage was built in 40 hours and disassembled in six.

=== European stadium leg ===
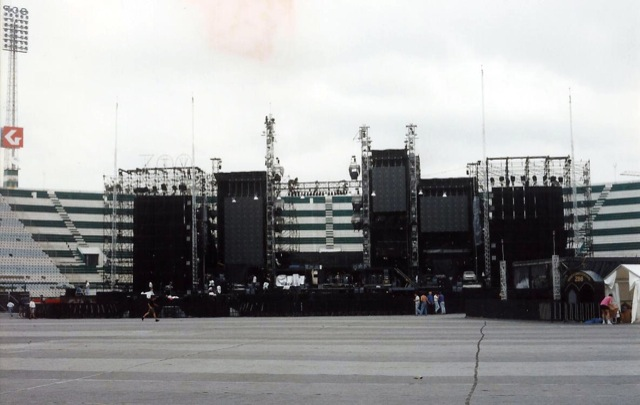
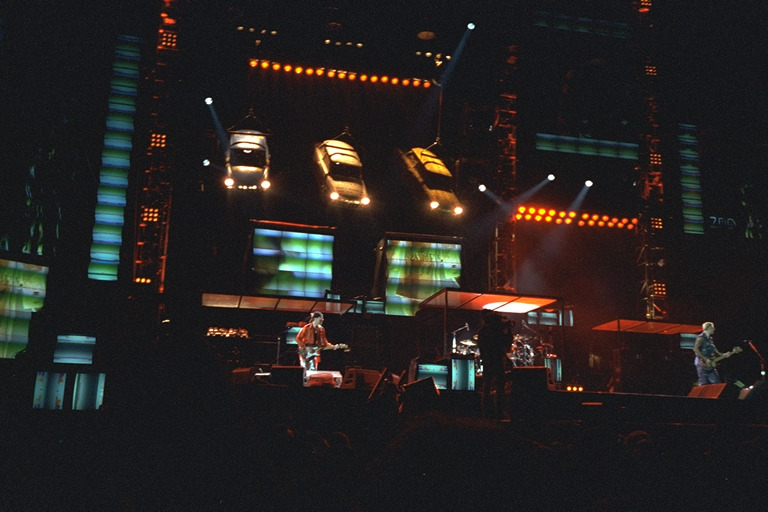
The "Zooropa" version of the stage, before and during a concert in May 1993

The outdoor stage used for the 1993 legs of the tour was smaller due to budget concerns, and it discarded the Trabants hung from cranes, instead featuring three cars hanging behind the drum kit. All of the projection screens were replaced with video cubes, as the projectors were not bright enough for the European summer nights when daylight lasted later. The resulting video system used three Digiwalls of 41-inch (1,000 mm) projection cubes, four Vidiwalls (each 4 cubes high by 3 cubes wide), and thirty-six 27-inch (690 mm) Barco monitors. Comprising 178 cubes, the three Digiwalls varied in orientation: 14 cubes high by 6 cubes wide, 9 high by 5 wide, and 7 high by 7 wide. Williams said the new video system was "vastly superior" and that the changes made Zoo TV "the largest touring video facility ever created".

The sound system utilised 144 Clair Brothers' S4 Series II cabinets positioned in "two curved wings". These speaker stacks were 38 feet behind the drum riser and 45 feet behind the primary vocal position. The layout allowed for sightlines of 250 degrees within stadiums. To help focus the sound, the engineers installed a semicircle of Clair Brothers' P4 cabinets, comprising four arrays of six cabinets each, around the perimeter of the stage. Additional P4 speakers were placed on their sides on the edge of the B-stage. Underneath Bono's position at the front of the main stage were 16 Servo Drive sub-bass units. The concert at Roundhay Park in Leeds was supplemented by time-delayed speaker towers from SSE Hire due to the venue's elongated shape, making it the only show on the tour to use delay speakers. For the "Zooropa" monitor speaker system, Radio Station in-ear monitors were provided by Garwood Communications. The monitors were mixed with four Ramsa WS-840 consoles, with Skaff serving as the monitor engineer for Mullen and Clayton, and Vish Wadi for Bono and the Edge.

The European leg featured confetti cannons, provided by Shell Shock Firework Co. and JEM, that shot "Zoo Ecu" banknotes; these were replaced by "Zooropa" condoms in Ireland.

== Planning, itinerary, and ticketing ==
The design of a 1993 "Zooropa" leg ticket reflects the tour's media oversaturation themes. The tour was co-sponsored by MTV, as shown in the ticket's bottom right corner.

Rehearsals for the tour began in December 1991 at The Factory in Dublin. The band found it challenging to recreate all the sounds from the new album. They considered using additional musicians, but their sentimental attachment to a four-piece prevailed.

The tour was announced on 11 February 1992, less than three weeks before opening night. The opening leg consisted of 32 arena shows in 31 North American cities, from 29 February to 23 April. Four days after the tour announcement, tickets for some concerts were first put on sale. Though the band had toured North America every year between 1980 and 1987, they had been absent from the region's tour circuit for over four years before Zoo TV. The US concert business was in a slump at the time, and the routing of the first tour's two legs generally afforded only one show per city. This was intended to announce the band's return to major cities, to gauge demand for ticket sales, and to re-introduce the notion of a "hot ticket" to concertgoers.

Ticket sale arrangements varied from city to city, but in each case, a ticket limit per purchase was enforced. The band minimized the amount of shows for which tickets were sold at physical box offices, preferring to sell over the telephone instead. In cities where scalping was rampant, only telephone sales were offered, allowing ticket brokers to cancel duplicate orders. Tickets for the opening show on 29 February in Lakeland, Florida, sold out over the phone in four minutes, with demand exceeding supply by a factor of ten to one. Several cities' telephone systems were overwhelmed when Zoo TV tickets went on sale; Los Angeles telephone company Pacific Bell reported 54 million calls in a four-hour period, while Boston's telephone system was temporarily shut down.

On 19 February, the band departed Dublin for the US to prepare for the tour. While rehearsing in Lakeland for opening night, Eno consulted U2 on the visual aspects of the show. Unlike many of the group's previous tours, which began ahead of or coincident with the release of a new album, Zoo TV started four months after Achtung Baby was released, giving fans more time to familiarise themselves with the new songs. By opening night, the album had already sold three million copies in the US and seven million worldwide.

Details of the second leg of the tour were first released on 30 April with the announcement of four UK arena shows. Ticketing details were kept secret until radio advertisements announced that tickets had gone on sale at box offices. In many cases, tickets were limited to two per person to deter scalping. Due to the production costs and relatively small arena crowds, the European arena leg lost money. McGuinness had planned larger outdoor concerts in Berlin, Turin, Poland, and Vienna to help the tour break even, but only the Vienna concert occurred.

Plans for stadium shows were first mentioned by Iredale in March 1992, but not confirmed until the 23 April announcement of the "Outside Broadcast" leg in North America. It was accompanied by details of two concerts, for which tickets went on sale two days later. While U2 were motivated to play stadiums by pragmatic concerns, they saw it as an artistic challenge as well, imagining what artists Salvador Dalí or Andy Warhol would have done with such spaces. Rehearsals for "Outside Broadcast" began in Hersheypark Stadium in Hershey, Pennsylvania, on 2 August 1992. To accommodate fans who had been camping outside the venue to listen, the band held a public dress rehearsal concert on 7 August, with half-price tickets benefiting five local charities. Technical problems and pacing issues forced refinement to the show. On 5 August, six days before the official leg-opening concert at Giants Stadium, the group delayed the show by a day, due to the difficulty of assembling the large outdoor production. By the time "Outside Broadcast" began, Achtung Baby had sold four million copies in the US.

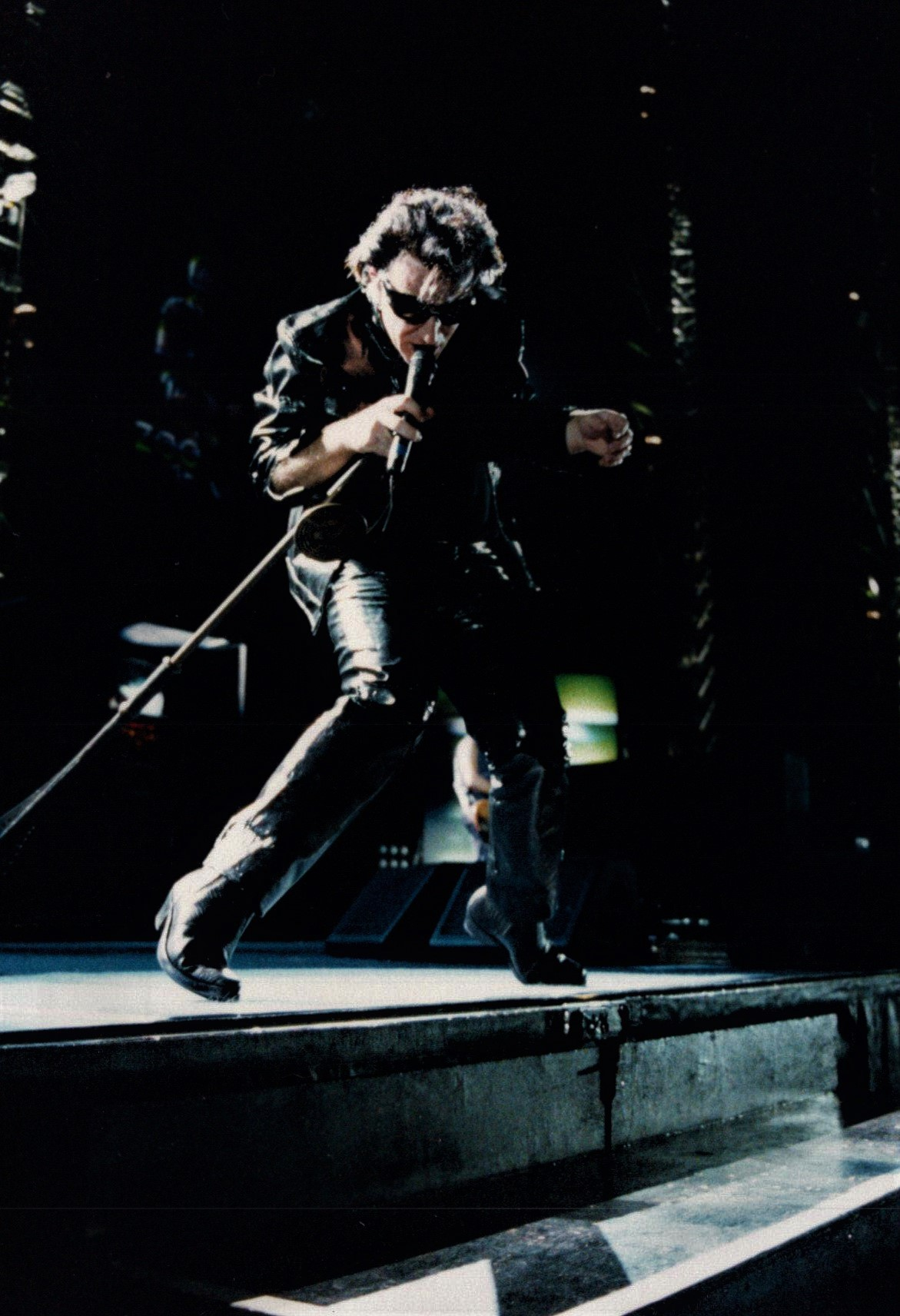
Bono during a performance on the Australian leg of the tour in 1993

The "Zooropa" leg was announced in late November 1992, and tickets for the British concerts were put on sale on 28 November. The leg, which began in May 1993, was U2's first full stadium tour of Europe and marked the first time they had visited certain areas. For the "Zoomerang" leg, the band faced difficulties with booking concerts in Sydney, Australia, where they wanted to stage a worldwide television broadcast to end the tour. In early August 1993, after the Sydney Cricket Ground Trust rejected the band's application to perform at the Sydney Football Stadium in November, Bono publicly questioned the city's viability as a candidate to host the 2000 Summer Olympics; the trust's decision was made despite allowing concerts by Madonna and Michael Jackson to be held at Sydney Cricket Ground in November. McGuinness faxed all 29 members of the Sydney Olympics 2000 Bid Committee to inform them of the situation. John Fahey, the Premier of New South Wales, personally intervened to allow the Sydney concerts to take place, and an announcement was made on 15 August confirming them. Tickets for the Sydney and Melbourne shows went on sale on 23 August. Scheduling for the "Zoomerang" leg afforded the band more off-days between shows than previous legs, but this amplified the exhaustion and restlessness that had set in by the tour's end.

Although Zoo TV was listed as co-sponsored by MTV, the group decided against explicit corporate sponsorship. The daily cost of producing the tour was US$125,000, regardless of whether a show was held on a given day. Band members, especially Mullen, were uncertain that the tour would be profitable. One of their chief concerns was how to procure Philips's costly Vidiwalls, which were priced at US$4–5 million. No rental company owned the video screens. McGuinness instead lobbied for Philips to provide the equipment at no cost; since U2 were signed to Island Records, which was owned by Philips subsidiary PolyGram, McGuinness and the band thought there was a natural corporate synergy to Philips providing the equipment for a PolyGram artist's tour. PolyGram CEO Alain Levy was unable to convince Philips to help, and the band had to pay for the Vidiwalls themselves; Levy did convince PolyGram to contribute about US$500,000 to the tour as a gesture of goodwill. In order to defray the heavy expenses of the Pacific shows, U2 asked for large guarantees from local promoters up front, rather than sharing the financial burden as they had in the past. This sometimes caused promoters to raise ticket prices above usual levels, which in turn sometimes resulted in less than full houses. Profit margin was a slim four to five per cent at most sold-out shows.

== Show overview ==
=== Pre-show ===
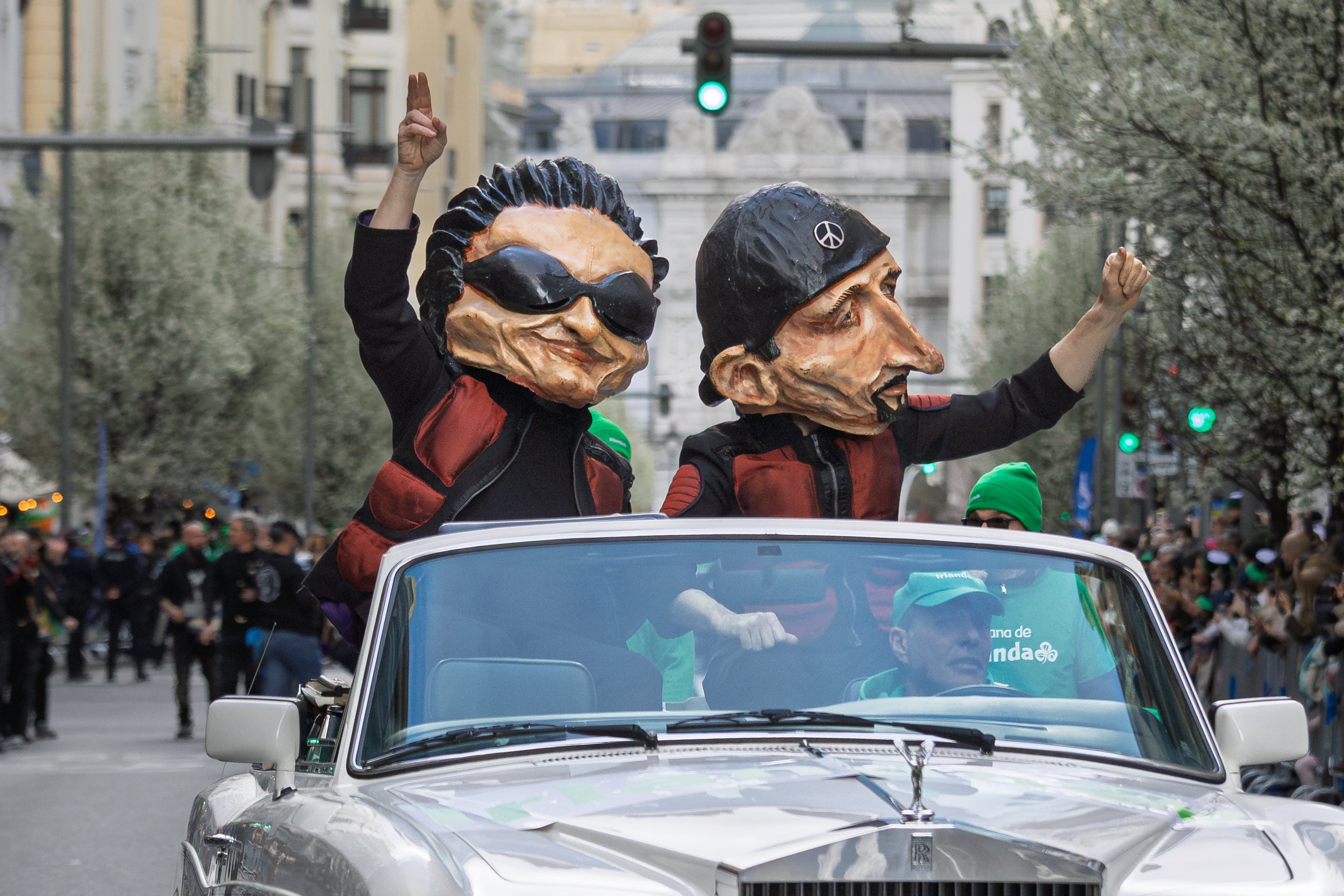
Oversized papier-mâché heads of Bono and the Edge. The theatre group Macnas wore these during pre-show performances in 1993.

During the time between the support acts and U2's performance, a disc jockey played records for the audience. For the 1992 legs, Irish rock journalist and radio presenter BP Fallon filled the role. Originally hired to write the Zoo TV tour programme, he played music inside a Trabant on the B-stage, while providing commentary and wearing a cape and top hat. His official title was "Guru, Viber and DJ". He hosted Zoo Radio, a November 1992 radio special that showcased live performances, audio oddities, and half-serious interviews with members of U2 and the opening acts. Two other DJs replaced him later on the tour: Paul Oakenfold, who became one of the world's most prominent club DJs by the decade's end; and Colin Hudd. For the 1993 concerts, U2 invited Irish theatre group Macnas to join the tour and perform between the support acts. The troupe wore oversized papier-mâché heads of the members of U2 and playacted a miming parody of them. Writer Bill Flanagan described the performances as "the jesters mocking the kings".

Zoo TV wasn't a set piece, it was a state of mind. It was constantly evolving and changing and taking on new ideas as it went ... We changed it consciously for each new area of the world.

— The Edge

Beginning with the 24 May 1992 show, Fallon played the song "Television, the Drug of the Nation" by hip-hop group the Disposable Heroes of Hiphoprisy just before the lights were turned off and U2 took the stage. The band believed that the song, a commentary on mass media culture, encapsulated some of the tour's principal themes. The Disposable Heroes of Hiphoprisy became one of the support acts for the "Outside Broadcast" leg, and after their stint, "Television" was retained for the remainder of the tour as the pre-show closing song.

After the lights were turned off, one of several video introductions was played on-screen to accompany the group taking the stage. During the "Outside Broadcast" leg, the piece was one by Emergency Broadcast Network that edited together various video clips of US President George H. W. Bush to give the impression of him singing Queen's song "We Will Rock You". A different introduction, created by Ned O'Hanlon and Maurice Linnane of Dreamchaser video productions, was used on the 1993 legs. This introduction reflected U2's growing concern with the volatile political situation in post-communist Europe and the resurgence of radical nationalism at the time. It featured footage from Leni Riefenstahl's Nazi propaganda films Triumph of the Will and Olympia, mixed with sounds from Lenin's Favourite Songs, Beethoven's Ninth Symphony, and voices asking "What do you want?" in different European languages. A visual of the flag of Europe was displayed, which then crumbled after one of the stars fell off.

=== Main set ===
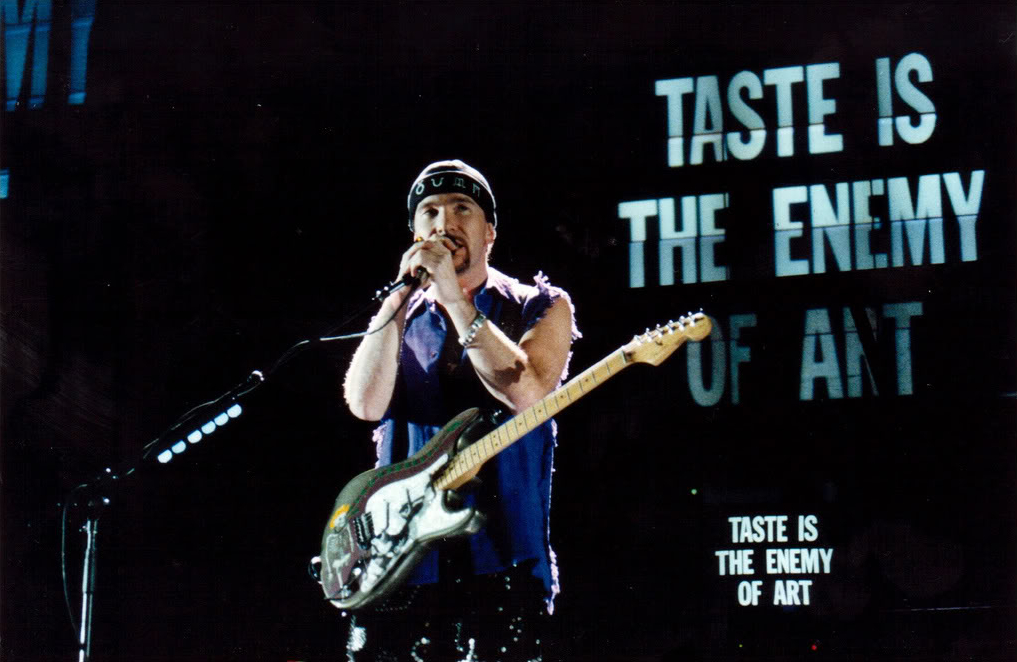
The Edge in 1993 during a performance of "The Fly", accompanied by the video screens rapidly flashing words and aphorisms

The concerts began with a fixed sequence of six to eight consecutive Achtung Baby songs, a further sign that the band were no longer the U2 of the 1980s. For the opening song, "Zoo Station", Bono entered as his primary stage persona, "The Fly", appearing silhouetted against a giant screen of blue and white video noise interwoven with glimpses of photo-copied animations of the band members. "The Fly" was usually performed next, with the video monitors flashing a rapidly changing array of words and aphorisms. Some of these included "Taste is the enemy of art", "Religion is a club", "Ignorance is bliss", "Watch more TV", "Believe" with letters fading out to leave "lie", and "Everything you know is wrong". During the first week of the tour, media outlets incorrectly reported that the words shown included "Bomb Japan Now", forcing the band to issue a statement denying the claim. Before performances of "Even Better Than the Real Thing", Bono channel surfed through live television programming, and during the song, as random images from television and pop culture flashed on screen, he filmed himself and the rest of the band with a camcorder.

In a Zoo Radio interview, the Edge described the visual material that accompanied the first three songs:

"'Zoo Station' is four minutes of a television that's not tuned into any station, but giving you interference and shash and almost a TV picture. 'The Fly' is information meltdown—text, sayings, truisms, untruisms, oxymorons, soothsayings, etc., all blasted at high speed, just fast enough so it's impossible to actually read what's being said. 'Even Better Than the Real Thing' is whatever happens to be flying around the stratosphere on that night. Satellite TV pictures, the weather, shopping channel, cubic zirconium diamond rings, religious channels, soap operas ..."

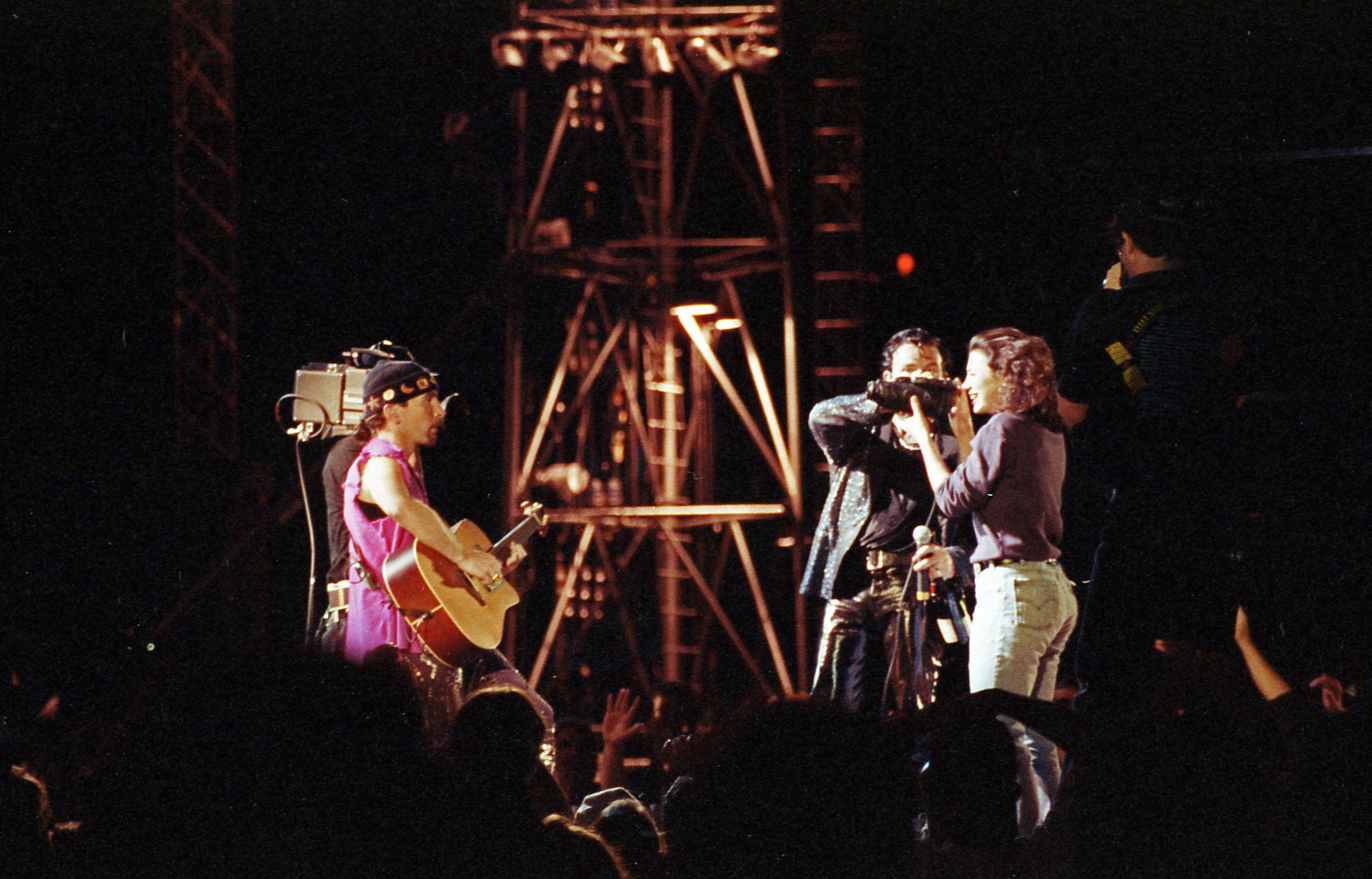
Bono helps a fan film the Edge with a video camera during an August 1992 concert

"Mysterious Ways" featured a belly dancer on-stage, tempting Bono and dancing just out of his reach. Initially, Floridian fan Christina Petro filled the role. After appearing outside the venue of the band's final dress rehearsal in a belly-dancing outfit, the crew invited her inside to dance with Bono to lighten the mood. The group liked their interaction and that it made reference to the belly dancer in the song's music video, and she accepted an invitation to join the tour. For the "Outside Broadcast" leg, tour choreographer Morleigh Steinberg took over the role. Performances of "One" were accompanied by the title word shown in many languages, as well as Mark Pellington-directed video clips of buffalos culminating with David Wojnarowicz's "Falling Buffalo" photograph. For "Until the End of the World", Bono often played with a camera, kissing the lens and thrusting it into his crotch, a stark contrast from his more earnest stage behaviour of the past. Beginning with "Outside Broadcast", the band began playing "New Year's Day" afterwards. During "Tryin' to Throw Your Arms Around the World", Bono danced with a young female fan from the crowd (a ritual he had done more solemnly on past tours), shared camcorder video filming duties with her, and sprayed champagne. At this point in the show, Mullen sometimes sang a solo performance of "Dirty Old Town".

The group played many Achtung Baby songs very similarly to the way they had appeared on record. Since this material was complex and layered, most numbers featuring pre-recorded or offstage percussion, keyboard, or guitar elements underlying the U2 members' live instrumentals and vocals. The band had used backing tracks in live performance before, but with the need to sync live performance to Zoo TV's high-tech visuals, almost the entire show was synced and sequenced. This practice has continued on their subsequent tours.

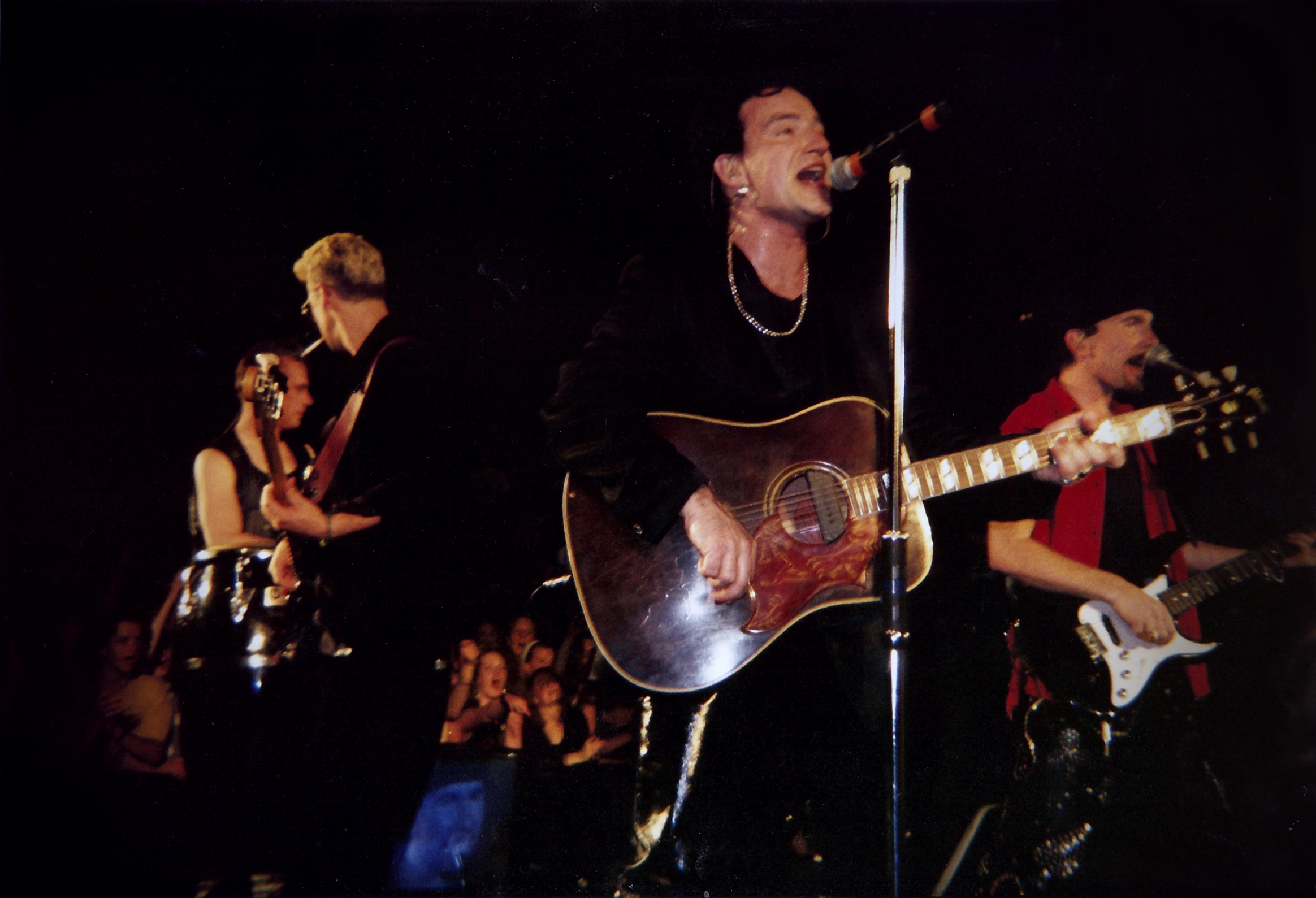
U2 during a B-stage performance in Kiel in June 1992

The middle segment of shows featured the band performing on the B-stage, which was intended "to be the antidote to Zoo TV". The idea had been inspired by the successful informality of the Elvis Presley '68 Comeback Special. From the B-stage, the band played quieter songs, such as acoustic arrangements of "Angel of Harlem", "When Love Comes to Town", "Stay (Faraway, So Close!)", and Lou Reed's "Satellite of Love". Many critics compared the B-stage performances to "busking" and singled them out as the shows' highlights.

After leaving the B-stage, U2 often played "Bad" or "Sunday Bloody Sunday", with performances of "Bullet the Blue Sky" and "Running to Stand Still" following. For "Bullet the Blue Sky", the video screens displayed burning crosses and swastikas. During "Running to Stand Still", Bono mimed the actions of a heroin addict from the B-stage, rolling up his sleeves and then pretending to spike his arm during the final lyric. Afterwards, red and yellow smoke flares ignited from opposite ends of the B-stage, before the band re-grouped on the main stage to play older songs with more sincerity. "Where the Streets Have No Name" was accompanied by sped-up video of the group in the desert from The Joshua Tree's photo shoot. U2 often finished their set with "Pride (In the Name of Love)" while a clip from Martin Luther King Jr.'s famed 3 April 1968 "I've Been to the Mountaintop" speech was played on the video screens. The group was initially unconvinced that the leap from the rest of the show's irony and artifice to something more sincere would be successful, but they thought that it was important to demonstrate that certain ideals were so strong and true that they could be held onto no matter the circumstance. The group alternated between performing "I Still Haven't Found What I'm Looking For" acoustically on the B-stage and using it to conclude the main set.

=== Encore ===
Beginning with the "Outside Broadcast" leg, footage from the tour's "video confessional booth" was displayed on the video screens during the intermission. Before each concert, fans were encouraged to visit the booth—a converted chemical toilet near the mix station—and record a 20-second confession. The video crew would then edit together the confessional footage to broadcast later that evening before the encore. The "confessions" varied from a woman flashing her breasts to a man revealing he had injured people in a drunk-driving incident. The inspiration for the video confessional came the day before the "Outside Broadcast" leg officially began.

For encores, Bono returned to the stage as a different alter ego—Mirror Ball Man in 1992, and MacPhisto in 1993. Performances of "Desire" were accompanied by images of Richard Nixon, Margaret Thatcher, Paul Gascoigne, and Jimmy Swaggart, and were meant as a criticism of greed; cash rained the stage and Bono portrayed Mirror Ball Man as an interpretation of the greedy preacher described in the song's lyrics. Bono often made a crank call from the stage as his persona of the time. Such calls included dialing a phone sex hotline, requesting a taxi cab, ordering 10,000 pizzas (the Detroit pizza parlor delivered 100 pizzas during the show), or contacting a local politician. Bono regularly called the White House in an attempt to contact President Bush. Though Bono never reached the President, Bush did acknowledge the calls during a press conference.

"Ultraviolet (Light My Way)" and "With or Without You" were frequently played afterwards. Concerts initially ended with Achtung Baby's slower "Love Is Blindness". Beginning with the "Outside Broadcast" shows, it was often followed by Bono's falsetto take on Elvis Presley's long-time show-closing ballad, "Can't Help Falling in Love", culminating in Bono softly stating that "Elvis is still in the building". Both songs presented a low-key, introspective conclusion to the show, in contrast to the dynamic, aggressive opening; the group also wanted to move away from its tradition of ending concerts with the fan sing-along favourite "40". The night finished with a single video message being displayed: "Thanks for shopping at Zoo TV".

=== Guest appearances ===
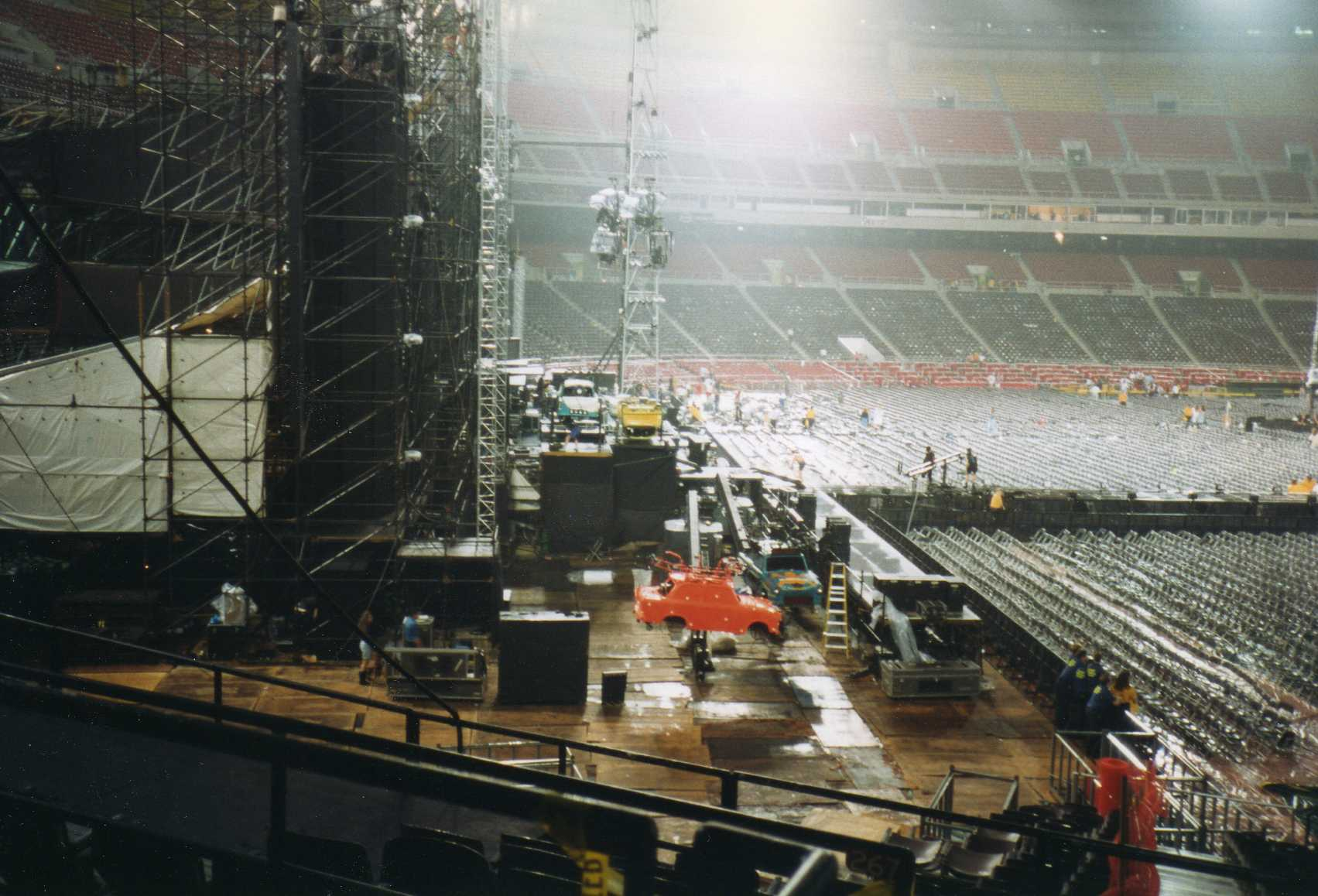
Side view of the stage at Veterans Stadium in Philadelphia after a September 1992 concert

On 11 June 1992, Benny Andersson and Björn Ulvaeus of ABBA appeared on-stage in Stockholm for the first time in years to perform "Dancing Queen" with U2; the song had been frequently covered on the tour up to that point. Other guest performers on the tour included Axl Rose, Jo Shankar, and Achtung Baby co-producer Daniel Lanois.

On 19 June 1992, during the European indoor leg, U2 played the "Stop Sellafield" concert in Manchester, alongside Kraftwerk, Public Enemy, and Big Audio Dynamite II, to protest the operation of a second nuclear fuel reprocessing plant at Sellafield. The following morning, U2 and other protesters participated in a demonstration against the facility organised by Greenpeace. Wearing white radiation suits, the band members landed on the beach at Sellafield in rubber dinghies and placed a 3-kilometre-long (1.9 mi) line of 700 placards on the shore spelling out "React – Stop Sellafield" for the waiting media.

At the first "Outside Broadcast" show on 12 August 1992 at Giants Stadium, Lou Reed performed "Satellite of Love" with the band; he and Bono dueted using their contrasting vocal styles. Bono re-confirmed the singer's influence on the band by announcing, "Every song we've ever written was a rip-off of a Lou Reed song." For the second show and the remainder of the tour, a taping of Reed singing the song was used for a virtual duet between him and Bono.

Novelist Salman Rushdie joined the band on stage in London's Wembley Stadium on 11 August 1993, despite the death fatwā against the author and the risk of violence arising from his controversial novel The Satanic Verses. In reference to the novel's satanic references, Rushdie, when confronted by Bono's MacPhisto character, observed that "real devils don't wear horns". In 2010, Clayton recalled that "Bono had been calling Salman Rushdie from the stage every night on the Zoo TV tour. When we played Wembley, Salman showed up in person and the stadium erupted. You [could] tell from Larry's face that we weren't expecting it. Salman was a regular visitor after that. He had a backstage pass and he used it as often as possible. For a man who was supposed to be in hiding, it was remarkably easy to see him around the place."

== Bono's stage personae ==
Bono assumed a number of costumed alter egos during Zoo TV performances. The three main personae that he used on stage were the Fly, Mirror Ball Man, and MacPhisto. During performances of "Bullet the Blue Sky" and "Running to Stand Still", he also appeared on stage wearing a military utility vest and cap, and a microphone headset. As this character, he ranted and raved in an act he said was set in the Vietnam War.

To escape their reputation for being overly serious and self-righteous, U2 decided to alter their image by being more facetious. Bono said, "All through the Eighties we tried to be ourselves and failed when the lights were on. Which is what set us up for Zoo TV. We decided to have some fun being other people, or at least other versions of ourselves." The Edge said, "We were quite thrilled at the prospect of smashing U2 and starting all over again." The group viewed humour as the appropriate response to their negative perception and that although their message would not change, they needed to change how they delivered it to their audience.

=== The Fly ===
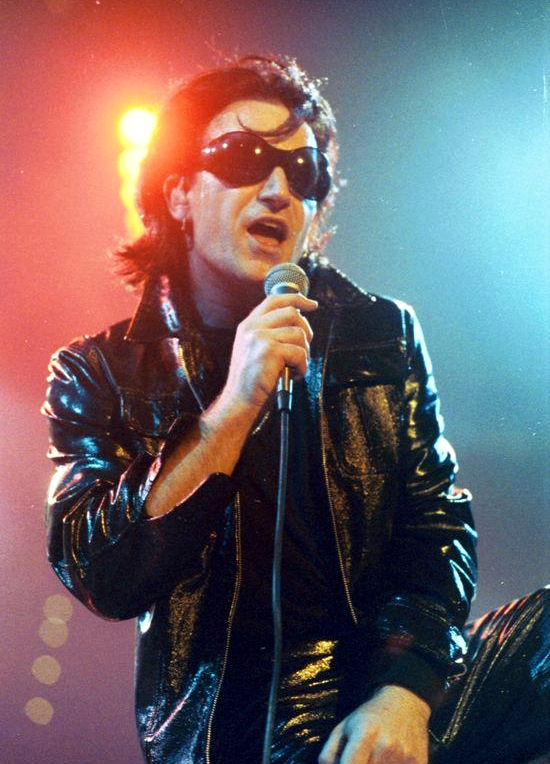
Bono in 1992 as his persona the Fly, a leather-clad egomaniac meant to parody rock stardom

Bono conceived his Fly persona during the writing of the song of the same name. The character began with Bono wearing an oversized pair of blaxploitation sunglasses, given to him by wardrobe manager Fintan Fitzgerald, to lighten the mood in the studio. Bono wrote the song's lyrics as this character, composing a sequence of "single-line aphorisms". He developed the persona into a leather-clad egomaniac, describing his outfit as having Lou Reed's glasses, Elvis Presley's jacket, and Jim Morrison's leather trousers. To match the character's dark fashion, Bono dyed his naturally-brown hair black.

Bono began each concert as the Fly and continued to play the character for most of the first half of the concert. In contrast to his earnest stage persona of the 1980s, as the Fly, Bono strutted around the stage with "swagger and style", exhibiting mannerisms of an egotistical rock star. He adopted the mindset that he was "licensed to be an egomaniac". He often stayed in character away from the tour stage, including for public appearances and when staying in hotels. He said, "That rather cracked character could say things that I couldn't", and that it offered him a greater freedom of speech.

=== Mirror Ball Man ===
As the Mirror Ball Man, Bono dressed in a shining silver lamé suit with matching shoes and cowboy hat. The character was meant to parody greedy American televangelists, showmen, and car salesman, and was inspired by Phil Ochs' Elvis persona from his 1970 tour. Bono said that the character represented "a kind of showman America. He had the confidence and charm to pick up a mirror and look at himself and give the glass a big kiss. He loved cash and in his mind success was God's blessing. If he's made money, he can't have made any mistakes." As the character, Bono spoke with an exaggerated Southern US accent. Mirror Ball Man appeared during the show's encore and made nightly prank calls, often to the White House. Bono portrayed this alter ego on the first three legs of the tour, but replaced him with MacPhisto for the 1993 legs.

=== MacPhisto ===
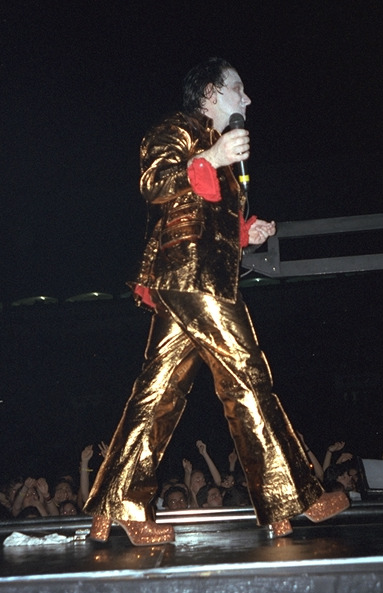
Bono as MacPhisto in Portugal in May 1993

MacPhisto was created to parody the devil and was named after Mephistopheles of the Faust legend. Initially called "Mr. Gold", MacPhisto wore a gold lamé suit with gold platform shoes, pale makeup, lipstick, and devil's horns on his head. As MacPhisto, Bono spoke with an exaggerated upper-class English accent, similar to that of a down-on-his-luck character actor. The character was created as a European replacement for the American-influenced Mirror Ball Man. The initial inspiration for MacPhisto came from a character in the stage musical The Black Rider, a performance of which Bono and the Edge attended in January 1993. The MacPhisto character was realised during rehearsal the night before U2's first 1993 show. According to Bono, "We came up with a sort of old English Devil, a pop star long past his prime returning regularly from sessions on The Strip in Vegas and regaling anyone who would listen to him at cocktail hour with stories from the good old, bad old days." MacPhisto sang the closing "Can't Help Falling in Love" in an oddly childlike manner that many reviewers found one of the most poignant moments of the show.

As MacPhisto, Bono continued his routine of making in-concert prank calls that had begun with Mirror Ball Man, and he changed his targets with the location of each show. Many of them were local politicians who Bono wished to mock by engaging them in character as the devil. Among his targets were the Archbishop of Canterbury, Helmut Kohl, Bénédict Hentsch, the Pope, Alessandra Mussolini, Hans Janmaat, Bernard Tapie, John Gummer, and Jan Henry T. Olsen. Bono enjoyed making these calls, saying, "When you're dressed as the Devil, your conversation is immediately loaded, so if you tell somebody you really like what they're doing, you know it's not a compliment." The band intended MacPhisto to add humour while making a point. The Edge said: "That character was a great device for saying the opposite of what you meant. It made the point so easily and with real humor." A female Cardiff fan who was pulled on-stage questioned Bono's motives for dressing as the devil, prompting the singer to compare his act to the plot of the C. S. Lewis novel The Screwtape Letters.

== Sarajevo satellite transmissions ==
Several European shows in 1993 featured live satellite link-ups with people living in Sarajevo as the city was sieged during the Bosnian War. The transmissions were arranged with help from American aid worker Bill Carter. Before their 3 July show in Verona, the band met with Carter to give an interview about Bosnia for Radio Televizija Bosne I Hercegovina. Carter described his experiences helping Sarajevans amidst the dangerous conditions. While in the city, Carter had seen a television interview on MTV in which Bono mentioned the theme of the "Zooropa" leg was a unified Europe. Carter felt such an aim was empty if Bosnia went overlooked, and so he sought Bono's help. He requested that U2 visit Sarajevo to bring attention to the war and break the "media fatigue" that had occurred from covering the conflict. Bono wanted the band to play a concert in the city, but their tour schedule prevented this, and McGuinness believed that a concert there would make them and their audience targets for the Serbian aggressors.

Instead, the group agreed to use the tour's satellite dish to conduct live video transmissions between their concerts and Carter in Sarajevo. Carter returned to the city and was able to assemble a video unit. The band had to purchase a satellite dish to be sent to Sarajevo and had to pay a £100,000 fee to join the European Broadcasting Union (EBU). Once set up, the band began satellite link-ups to Sarajevo on a near nightly basis, the first one airing on 17 July 1993 in Bologna. To connect with the EBU satellite feeds, Carter and two co-workers had to traverse "Sniper Alley" at night to reach the Sarajevo television station, and they had to film with as little light as possible to avoid the attention of snipers. This was done ten times over the course of a month. Carter discussed the deteriorating situation in the city, and Bosnians often spoke to U2 and their audience. These grim interviews deviated from the rest of the show, and they were completely unscripted, leaving the group unsure of who would be speaking or what they would say. U2 stopped the broadcasts in August 1993 after learning that the siege of Sarajevo was being reported on the front of many British newspapers. Though this trend had begun before the first link-up, Nathan Jackson suggested that U2's actions had brought awareness of the situation to their fans, and to the British public indirectly.

Reactions to the transmissions were mixed, triggering a media debate concerning the ethical implications of mixing rock entertainment with human tragedy. The Edge said: "A lot of nights it felt like quite an abrupt interruption that was probably not particularly welcomed by a lot of people in the audience. You were grabbed out of a rock concert and given a really strong dose of reality and it was quite hard sometimes to get back to something as frivolous as a show having watched five or ten minutes of real human suffering." Mullen worried that the band were exploiting the Bosnians' suffering for entertainment. In 2002, he said: "I can't remember anything more excruciating than those Sarajevo link-ups. It was like throwing a bucket of cold water over everybody. You could see your audience going, 'What the fuck are these guys doing?' But I'm proud to have been a part of a group who were trying to do something." During a transmission to the band's concert at Wembley Stadium, three women in Sarajevo told Bono via satellite: "We know you're not going to do anything for us. You're going to go back to a rock show. You're going to forget that we even exist. And we're all going to die." Some people close to the band joined the War Child charity project, including Brian Eno. Flanagan believed that the link-ups accomplished Bono's goal for Zoo TV of "illustrating onstage the obscenity of idly flipping from a war on CNN to rock videos on MTV". U2 vowed to perform in Sarajevo someday, and they ultimately fulfilled that commitment with a concert on 23 September 1997 during their PopMart Tour.

== Recording and release of Zooropa ==
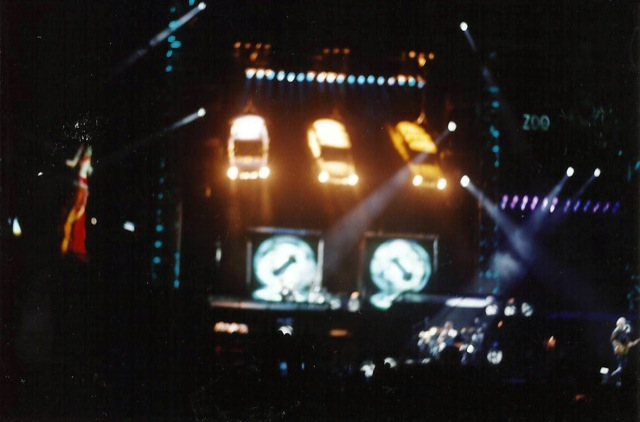
U2 performing during the "Zooropa" leg of the tour in May 1993, as the group completed the Zooropa album

U2 recorded their eighth studio album, Zooropa, from February to May 1993 during an extended break between the third and fourth legs of the tour. The album was originally intended as a companion EP to Achtung Baby, but quickly expanded into a full LP. Recording could not be completed before the tour restarted, and for the first month of the "Zooropa" leg, the band flew home after shows, recording until the early morning and working on their off-days, before travelling to their next destination. Clayton called the process "about the craziest thing you could do to yourself", while Mullen said of it, "It was mad, but it was mad good, as opposed to mad bad." McGuinness later said the band had nearly wrecked themselves in the process. The album was released on 5 July 1993. Influenced by the tour's themes of technology and mass media, Zooropa was an even greater departure in style from their earlier recordings than Achtung Baby was, incorporating further dance music influences and electronic effects. Songs from the album were incorporated into the setlists on the subsequent "Zooropa" and "Zoomerang" legs, most frequently "Numb" and "Stay (Faraway, So Close!)". For the "Zoomerang" leg, "Daddy's Gonna Pay for Your Crashed Car" and "Lemon" were added to the encore and "Dirty Day" to the main set.

== Broadcasts, recordings, and releases ==
On 9 September 1992, a portion of U2's performance at the Pontiac Silverdome was broadcast live to the 1992 MTV Video Music Awards. The band performed "Even Better Than the Real Thing" while VMA host Dana Carvey, dressed as his Garth persona from "Wayne's World", accompanied the band on drums in Los Angeles. A Zoo Radio special included live selections from 1992 shows from Toronto, Dallas, Tempe, and New York City. On 28 and 29 November 1992, a television special entitled Zoo TV Featuring U2 was aired, featuring portions of several "Outside Broadcast" leg shows as well as William S. Burroughs' reading of the sardonic poem "A Thanksgiving Prayer". Directed by Kevin Godley, the programme was broadcast in North America on Fox, and in Europe via Channel 4, Premiere, France 2, Rai Uno, RTVE, TV1000, and Veronica. Several 1992 shows, including the 11 June concert in Stockholm and 27 October concert in El Paso, were broadcast into the homes of fans who had won contests. In October 1992, U2 released Achtung Baby: The Videos, The Cameos, and a Whole Lot of Interference from Zoo TV, a VHS compilation of nine music videos from Achtung Baby. Interspersed between the music videos were clips of so-called "interference", comprising documentary footage, media clips, and other video similar to what was displayed on tour.

Two November 1993 "Zoomerang" shows in Sydney were filmed on consecutive nights as part of a worldwide television broadcast. The 26 November concert was staged as a rehearsal for the production crew in advance of the official filming the following night. However, Clayton, who began drinking excessively on the latter stages of the tour, was unable to perform on 26 November after experiencing an alcoholic blackout. The band ruled out canceling the show, since it was the only opportunity for the production crew to do a dry run of the filming. Bass guitar technician Stuart Morgan filled in for Clayton instead, marking the first time a member of U2 had missed a concert since their earliest days. Clayton recovered in time to play the 27 November show, which was broadcast in the United States on tape-delayed pay-per-view. U2 originally planned to produce the concert with MTV for a January 1994 "triplecast" that would have offered three different perspectives of the show on three separate television channels. After realising they had not fully developed the concept, the group cancelled the "triplecast", denying themselves income that was supposed to make the Pacific leg of the tour profitable. The show was subsequently released as the concert video Zoo TV: Live from Sydney in 1994, and the double CD Zoo TV Live in 2006 to subscribing members of U2's website. The video won the Grammy Award for Best Long Form Music Video at the 37th Annual Grammy Awards ceremony.

== Reception ==
=== Critical response ===
Reviews written during the initial arena legs reflected the dramatic change in U2's approach. Many critics published favourable reviews about the tour. The San Francisco Chronicle praised the special effects for supplementing the music. The reviewer wrote, "The often-surrealistic effects always served the songs, not the other way around." The review concluded, "this magnificent multimedia production will serve as a pinnacle in rock's onstage history for sometime [sic] to come". Edna Gundersen of USA Today said that U2 was dismantling its myth and wrote that the show was "a trippy and decadent concert of bedazzling visuals and adventurous music". Melody Maker's Jon Wiederhorn wrote that he expected to dislike the show based upon their past stage history, "But, alas, I cannot be negative about U2 tonight. Their Zoo TV show is visually stunning, musically unparalleled, downright moving and, dammit, truly entertaining." Hot Press' Bill Graham said of the show, "U2 don't so much use every trick in the book as invent a whole new style of rock performance art." For Graham, the tour resolved any doubts he had about the band—particularly about Bono—following their reinvention with Achtung Baby.

Other critics indicated befuddlement as to U2's purpose. The Asbury Park Press wrote that the long string of Achtung Baby song presentations that opened the show made one forget about the band's past, and that "almost everything you knew about U2 a couple years ago is, in fact, wrong now". The Star-Ledger said that the band shortchanged its music with its video presentations and that especially during the opening sequence, "one was only aware of the music as a soundtrack to the real 'show'". It concluded by saying that the group had lost the sense of mystery and yearning that made it great and that they had succumbed to the style of music videos. Jon Pareles of The New York Times acknowledged that U2 was trying to break its former earnest image and that they were a "vastly improved band" for being "trendy" and "funny"; yet, he commented, "U2 wants to have its artifice and its sincerity at the same time—no easy thing—and it hasn't yet made the breakthrough that will unite them."

The stadium legs of the tour received more consistent praise than the arena shows. Critics noted that while the show and its setlist were largely the same as before, the tour mostly benefited from the increased scale. The New York Daily News said that the stage "looked like a city made of television sets—an electronic Oz" and that "glitz was used not as a mere distraction (as it has been by so many video-age artists), but as a determined conceit". Gundersen also made the comparison to Oz, saying that even though the band was dwarfed by the setting, their adventurous musicianship still shone through. She concluded that the group had "deliver[ed] a brilliant high-wire act" between mocking and exploiting rock music clichés, a comparison also made by stage designer Willie Williams. Robert Hilburn of the Los Angeles Times said of the outdoor American leg, "Zoo TV is the yardstick by which all other stadium shows will be measured." David Fricke of Rolling Stone said that the band had "regained critical and commercial favor by negotiating an inspired balance between rock's cheap thrills and its own sense of moral burden". He praised the band for "retool[ing] themselves as wiseacres with heart and elephant bucks to burn". Fricke noted that the increased visual effects for the "Outside Broadcast" leg increased the shows' "mind-fuck" factor. Many critics described the tour as "post-modern". The writers of Rolling Stone, in a best-of-1992 issue, named U2 co-winners of "Best Band", while awarding the Zoo TV Tour honours for both "Best Tour" and "Worst Tour".

The Independent praised the "Zooropa" leg, with the reviewer stating, "I came as a sceptic, and left believing I had witnessed the most sophisticated meeting of technical wizardry and mojo priestcraft ever mounted." Dave Fanning of The Irish Times praised the "Zooropa" leg, stating, "If this is the show by which all other rock circuses must be measured, then God help the new music." Fanning observed that the group, particularly Bono, exhibited "style, sex and self-assurance". Billboard wrote, "No one is dancing on the edges of rock'n'roll's contradictions as effectively these days as U2." The stadium legs had their detractors, as NME called the shows a "two-hour post-modernist Pot Noodle advert made by politically naive, culturally unaware squares with the help of some cool, arty people". Graham thought that the scale of the stadium shows led to more predictability and less interaction with the audiences.

=== Fan reaction ===
The group and the music industry were unsure how fans would receive the tour beforehand. During the first week of shows, Bono said, "This show is a real roller coaster ride, and some people will want to get off, I'm sure." He remained optimistic that their devoted fans would continue following them, but cautioned he had no intention of resisting the glamour and fame: "Oh, but it's fun to be carried away by the hype. Where would you be without the hype? ... You can't pretend all the promotion and all the fanfare is not happening." Some hardcore fans, particularly in the US, objected to the tour as a blatant sellout to commercial values, while others misinterpreted the tour's mocking of excess, believing that, according to VH1's Legends, "U2 had 'lost it' and that Bono had become an egomaniac". Many Christian fans were offended by the band's antics and believed they had abandoned their religious faith.

By the outdoor legs, many fans knew what to expect, and Pareles observed that Bono's admonitions to never cheer a rock star were greeted with idolatrous applause; he concluded that the show's message of scepticism was somewhat lost on the audience and that, "No matter what Bono tells his fans, they seem likely to trust him anyway." By the end of the tour's first year, U2 had won over many fans. In a 1992 end-of-year poll, readers of Q voted U2 "The Best Act in the World Today". The band's almost clean sweep of Rolling Stone's end-of-year readers' poll—which included "Best Artist", "Best Tour", and Bono as "Sexiest Male Artist"—reconfirmed for the magazine they were the "world's biggest rock band".

=== Commercial performance ===
On the opening leg of the tour, U2 grossed US$13,215,414 and sold 528,763 tickets to 32 shows. Sources gave varying box office figures for the band's entire 1992 North American itinerary; Pollstar reported that they grossed US$67 million from 73 shows, while Billboard reported that they grossed US$72,427,148 and sold 2,482,802 tickets to 77 concerts. Pollstar's reported gross figure was the highest amount by any touring artist that year, and at the time was the third-highest gross for a North American tour, behind the Rolling Stones' 1989 Steel Wheels Tour and New Kids on the Block's 1990 Magic Summer Tour. U2's three sold-out shows in Foxborough, Massachusetts, grossed US$4,594,205, ranking fourth on Amusement Business's list of top boxscores for 1992. Zoo TV sold 2.9 million tickets that year for North America and Europe combined.

The "Zooropa" stadium leg in 1993 played to more than 2.1 million people over 43 dates between 9 May and 28 August. In total, the Zoo TV Tour sold about 5.3 million tickets, and reportedly grossed US$151 million. The band incurred heavy expenses to produce the tour, leading to only a small profit. On the tour's final stop in Japan, McGuinness confirmed that T-shirt sales, which had topped 600,000 in North America in 1992, drove Zoo TV's profitability: "We grossed $30 million in T-shirt sales. Without those we'd be fucked." Bono later said: "When we built Zoo TV, we were so close to bankruptcy that if 5% fewer people went, U2 was bankrupt. Even in our irresponsible, youthful and fatal disregard of such material matters, it was terrifying."

=== Accolades ===
At the 1992 Billboard Music Awards, U2 won for the No. 1 Boxscore Tour. For the Pollstar Concert Industry Awards of 1992, the band were honoured for the Most Creative Stage Production, and were nominated for Most Creative Tour Package and Major Tour of the Year. For their work on the Zoo TV Tour, Willie Williams and Carol Dodds won an award for Designer of the Year/Lighting at the 1992 Lighting Dimensions International Awards.

== Impact and aftermath ==
=== Effect on U2 ===
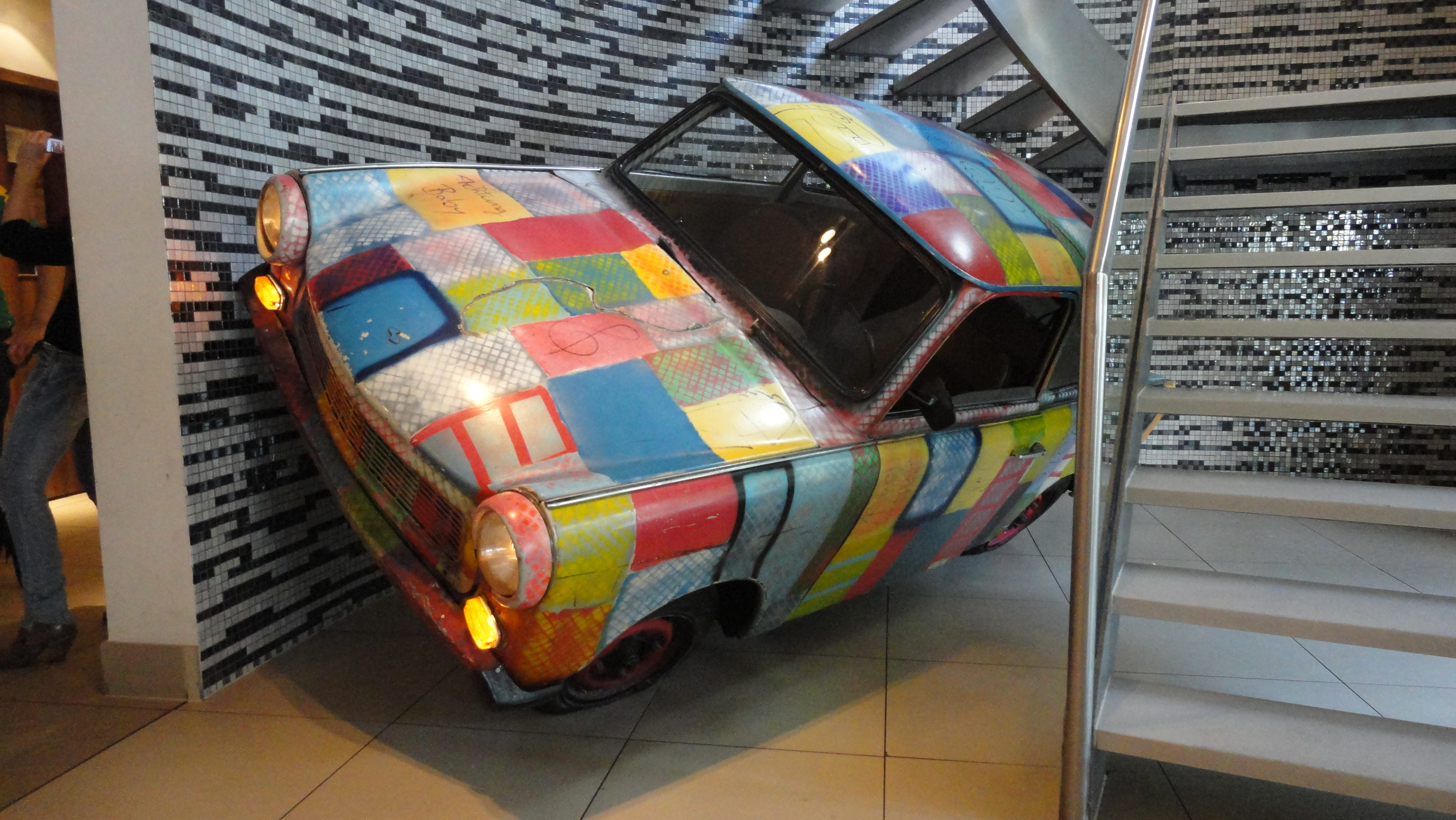
A Trabant from the tour's lighting system on display at a Hard Rock Cafe in Berlin

For the Zoo TV Tour, U2 embraced the "rock star" identity they had struggled with and were reluctant to accept throughout the 1980s. They drew the attention of celebrities, including American presidential candidate Bill Clinton, and they began partying more than they had in the past. During parts of the tour, the band attracted the fashion crowd; Clayton's romantic relationship with supermodel Naomi Campbell and Bono's friendship with supermodel Christy Turlington made them the subjects of unwanted tabloid attention. In May 1993, Campbell announced that she and Clayton were engaged, but by the "Zoomerang" leg, their relationship was fracturing and he was drinking frequently. After missing the group's 26 November 1993 show in Sydney from an alcoholic blackout, Clayton resolved to quit drinking altogether. The incident resulted in tensions within the group during the tour's final weeks as they contemplated whether to reallocate their revenues, which to that point had been split evenly five ways between the band members and McGuinness. Clayton's relationship with Campbell ended in 1994, but another member of U2 found love during the tour. The Edge became close with Morleigh Steinberg during her stint as the tour's choreographer and belly dancer. She moved to Dublin in 1994 to be with him, and they married in 2002.

The tour's two-year length, then U2's longest, exhausted the band as the final legs unfolded. Following the conclusion of Zoo TV, U2 took an extended break from recording as a group. Mullen and Clayton moved to Manhattan, where they sought out music lessons to become better musicians. The Edge and Bono spent most of 1994 living in newly renovated houses in the South of France. The Edge said, "as a band I think [the tour] stretched us all. We were a different band after that and touring was different." Producer Nellee Hooper later told Bono that Zoo TV "ruined irony for everyone".

The Fly and MacPhisto characters appeared in the animated music video to U2's 1995 song "Hold Me, Thrill Me, Kiss Me, Kill Me" from the soundtrack to Batman Forever. Author Višnja Cogan wrote that "the video crystallises and concludes the Zoo TV period and the changes that occurred" during that time. Director Joel Schumacher attempted to create a role for Bono as MacPhisto in Batman Forever, but both later agreed it was not suitable. In the years following the Zoo TV Tour, Bono continued to wear sunglasses in public, leading to it becoming one of his signature trademarks. In October 2014, Bono said that the reason he continued to wear sunglasses was because he suffers from glaucoma.

=== Effect on Pixies ===
The Pixies' stint as a support act caused a controversy that partially contributed to their breakup. In July 1992, Spin featured a cover story titled "U2 on Tour: The Story They Didn't Want You to Read", which detailed author Jim Greer's travels on the tour's first weeks with his unidentified girlfriend (who turned out to be Pixies' bassist Kim Deal). The article featured their criticisms of U2 for the supposed poor treatment the Pixies received. Both groups disagreed and were livid at Deal, particularly Pixies frontman Black Francis. In 1993, following tensions within the group, Francis announced the Pixies had dissolved.

== Legacy ==
=== Subsequent endeavours ===
As the tour drew to a close, U2 entered prolonged discussions about creating a Zoo TV television channel in partnership with MTV. This never materialised, but in 1997, MTV ran a brief miniseries called Zoo-TV, which featured Emergency Broadcast Network extending their tour role in creating contemporary surrealist satirical video. U2 endorsed the effort as a representation of what the tour would have been like as a news magazine, but their direct role was limited to providing half-financing and outtakes from the Zooropa album. Wired magazine said the series "pushe[d] the edge of commercial—even comprehensible—television".

U2's subsequent concert tour, 1997's PopMart Tour, followed in Zoo TV's footsteps by mocking another social trend, this time consumerism. Paul McGuinness said the group wanted "the production [of PopMart] to beat Zoo TV", and accordingly, the tour's spectacle was a further shift away from their austere stage shows of the 1980s; PopMart's stage featured a 150-foot-long (46 m) LED screen, a 100-foot-tall (30 m) golden arch containing the sound system, and a mirrorball lemon that served as a transport to the B-stage. Although critics were much less receptive to PopMart, in a 2009 interview, Bono said that he considers that tour to be their best: "Pop(Mart) is our finest hour. It's better than Zoo TV aesthetically, and as an art project it is a clearer thought."

In 2005, during their Vertigo Tour, the group often played a short set of songs as a homage to the Zoo TV Tour—"Zoo Station", "The Fly", and "Mysterious Ways"—as part of the first encore; performances of "Zoo Station" included the interference in the background visual effects, and "The Fly" used flashing text effects on the LED screens similar to the Zoo TV visuals.

Bono reprised the MacPhisto character during the band's 2018 Experience + Innocence Tour, using an augmented reality camera filter applied to his face. The band's creative team gave the character a new appearance after envisioning how 25 years of hard living would have changed him. As MacPhisto, Bono commented on sociopolitical events and movements of the time such as the Charlottesville rally. He punctuated these monologues by saying, "when you don't believe that I exist, that's when I do my best work".

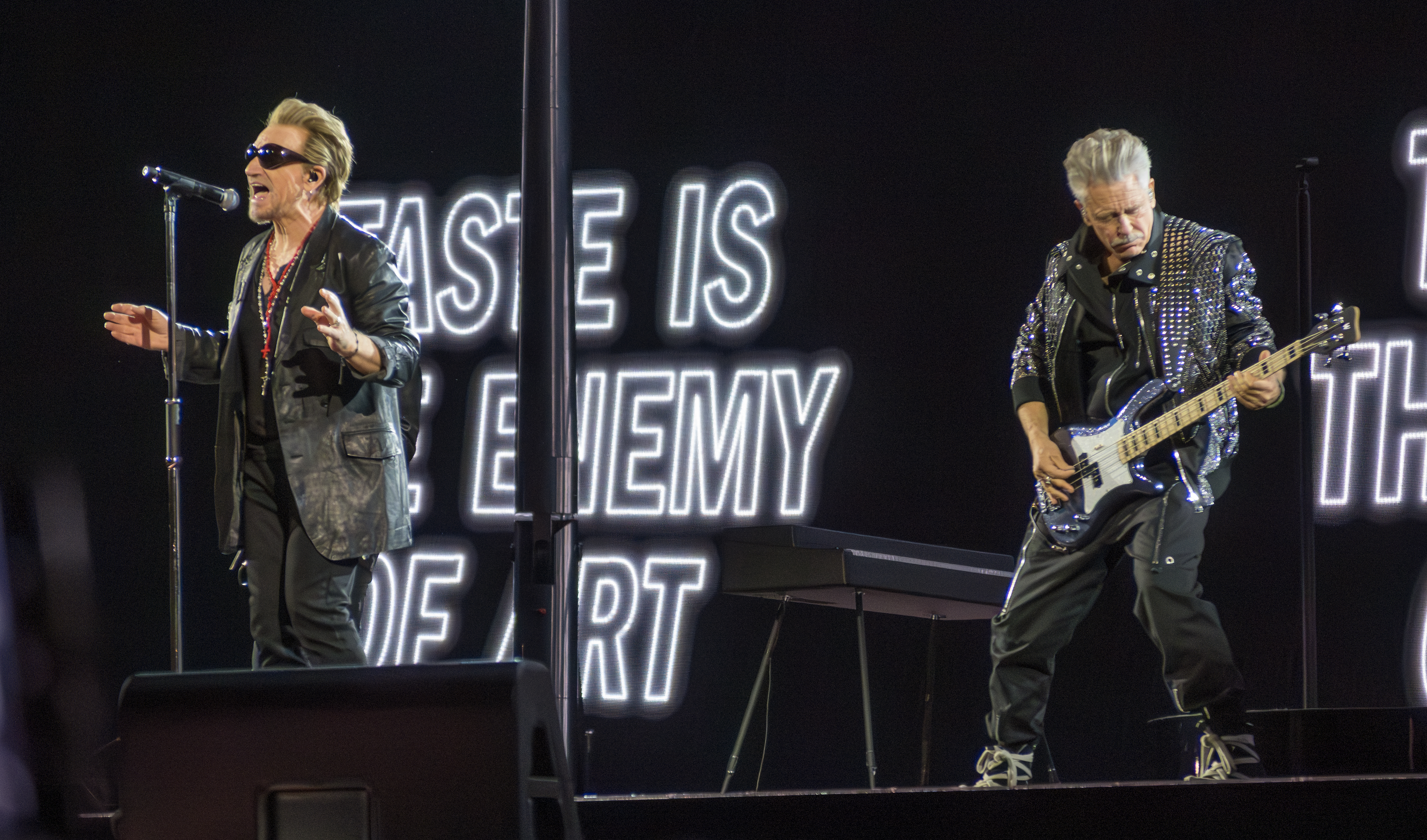
U2's 2023–2024 concert residency at Sphere, U2:UV Achtung Baby Live, referenced the Zoo TV Tour.

From September 2023 to March 2024, U2 staged a 40-date concert residency called U2:UV Achtung Baby Live to inaugurate the concert venue Sphere in the Las Vegas Valley. The shows featured a full performance of Achtung Baby and leveraged the venue's immersive video and sound capabilities. Willie Williams, who remained the band's production designer in the decades following the Zoo TV Tour, was initially uncertain about referencing it for the Sphere shows, believing that Zoo TV's multimedia spectacle had become ubiquitous since then. Ultimately, he decided to highlight certain visual elements from the tour that had not been as heavily replicated, with the aspiration of recreating the tour's overall atmosphere. The resulting show at Sphere referenced the Zoo TV visuals during several songs; performances of "Zoo Station" were accompanied by some of Mark Pellington's original footage from the tour, while the flashing text phrases that displayed during "The Fly" were reprised. Bono also revived his "Fly" stage character during the opening moments of the concerts.

=== Historical accounts and memorabilia ===
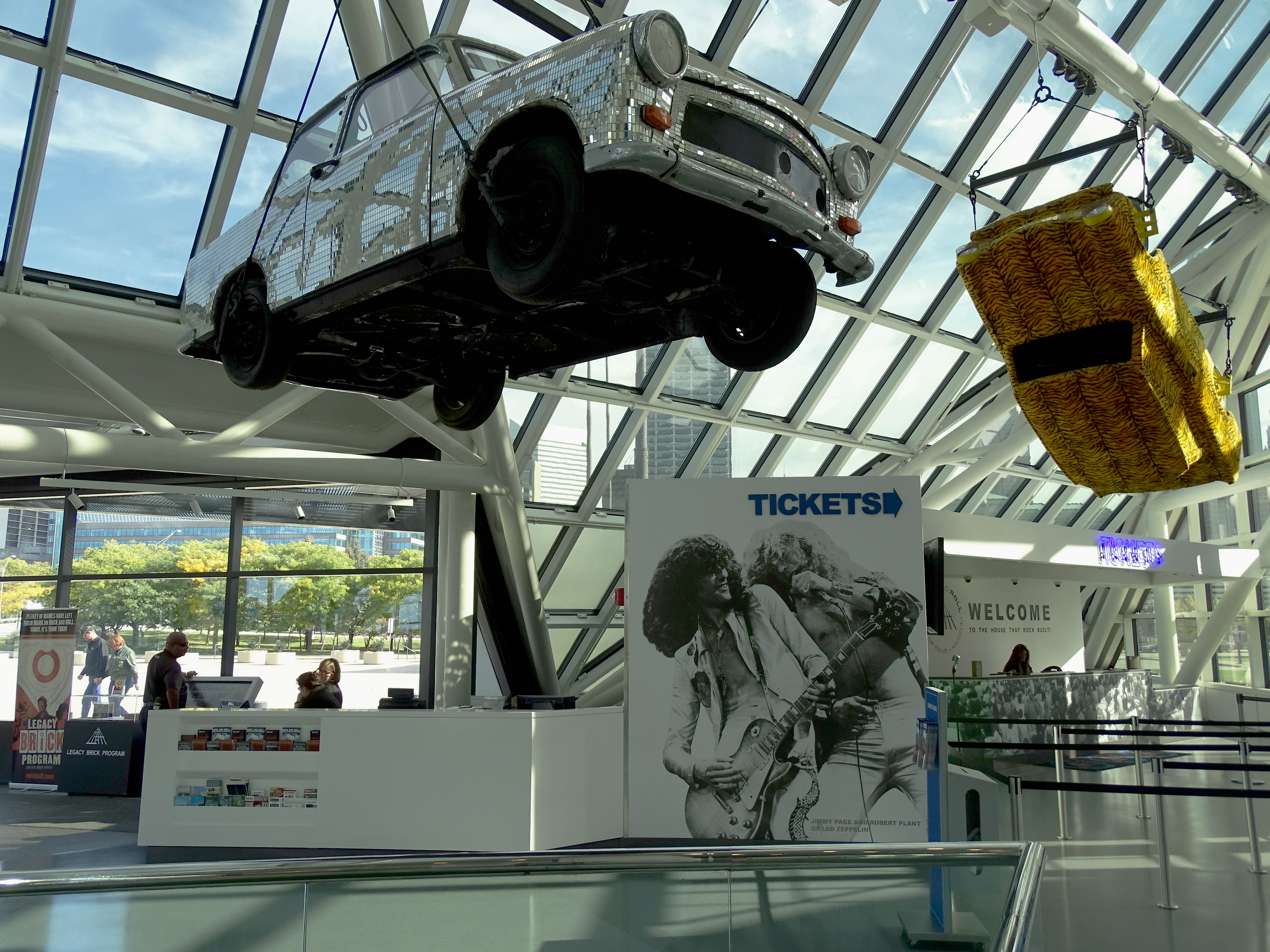
Trabants on display in the Rock and Roll Hall of Fame

In 1994, BP Fallon released the book U2: Faraway, So Close, documenting his experiences on the Zoo TV Tour while serving as a DJ. The following year, author Bill Flanagan released the book U2 at the End of the World, which similarly covers his time spent with the band during the tour.

When the Rock and Roll Hall of Fame opened in 1995, the lobby featured four Trabants suspended from the ceiling and a neon sign taken from the tour's set. A Trabant was on display in a Hard Rock Cafe location in Dublin from 2004 to 2018.

=== Critical analysis, retrospective appraisal, and influence ===
Critics regard the Zoo TV Tour as one of rock's most memorable and influential tours. During the "Zooropa" leg of the tour, Guy Garcia of Time called Zoo TV "one of the most electrifying rock shows ever staged". In 1997, Robert Hilburn wrote that "It's not unreasonable to think of it as the Sgt. Pepper's of rock tours." In 2002, Tom Doyle of Q called it "still the most spectacular rock tour staged by any band", and in 2013, the magazine listed it as one of the "ten greatest gigs of all time". In 2009, critic Greg Kot of the Chicago Tribune said, "Zoo TV remains the finest supersized tour mounted by any band in the last two decades." Ryan Dombal of Pitchfork wrote in a review of Achtung Baby's 20th anniversary reissue, "Even 20 years on, the tour looks like something to behold, a singularly inventive experience that no band—including U2 itself—has been able to really expound upon in a meaningful way." Rolling Stone included the tour on its 2017 list of "The 50 Greatest Concerts of the Last 50 Years"; writer Andy Greene said, "The wall-to-wall video screens also set the scene for every pop spectacle that followed, from Lady Gaga's Monster Ball to Kanye West's Glow in the Dark Tour." In 2025, Consequence ranked Zoo TV 26th on a list of the 100 best tours, writing that U2 "revolutionized the live touring experience with a multimedia extravaganza" and "cemented its status as one of the most exciting live acts of all time".

In comparing Zoo TV to the U2:UV Achtung Baby Live residency, Steven Hyden of Uproxx said, "The point back then for U2 was using technology to comment on (and condemn) the use of technology as a means of cutting humanity off from their most essential selves. The big screens fed the audience a steady stream of stimuli while always pointing out that gorging on visual stimuli will rot your brain." He added, "In the '90s, U2 [broke the fourth wall] by using artifice to smash through artifice, pointing out the invisible wall of omnipresent media immersion surrounding us all in order to make it visible and therefore capable of being transcended on the journey toward something deeper and truer." Bob Gendron, writing for the Chicago Tribune, said in 2023 that on the Zoo TV Tour "the band paired the visual spectacle with pointed and prophetic cultural commentary, exploring mass-media saturation, pervasive materialism and, particularly, the increasingly thinning lines between entertainment, news and commerce". He said that it "forever changed the live-music experience" and that it was "arguably the most groundbreaking tour of the last 35 years and marked the debut of now-ubiquitous video walls". Mikael Wood of the Los Angeles Times said that the tour "cemented video as a crucial component of the modern pop concert".

Bono claimed that with Zoo TV, U2 were the first act to develop the B-stage following the invention of in-ear monitors. In 2001, Willie Williams said that in the time since the tour, the B-stage had become "completely de rigueur in the industry; every band you see now has a B stage."

== Tour dates ==
List of 1992 concerts, showing date, city, country, venue, tickets sold, number of available tickets and amount of gross revenue
Date (1992)	City	Country	Venue	Opening act	Attendance	Revenue
29 February	Lakeland	United States	Lakeland Civic Center	Pixies	7,251 / 7,251	$181,275
1 March	Miami	United States	Miami Arena	Pixies	14,000 / 14,000	—N/a
3 March	Charlotte	United States	Charlotte Coliseum	Pixies	22,786 / 22,786	$569,650
5 March	Atlanta	United States	The Omni	Pixies	16,336 / 16,336	$408,400
7 March	Hampton	United States	Hampton Coliseum	Pixies	10,187 / 10,187	$254,675
9 March	Uniondale	United States	Nassau Coliseum	Pixies	17,397 / 17,397	$434,275
10 March	Philadelphia	United States	The Spectrum	Pixies	18,349 / 18,349	$458,725
12 March	Hartford	United States	Hartford Civic Center	Pixies	16,438 / 16,438	$385,662
13 March	Worcester	United States	Centrum in Worcester	Pixies	13,835 / 13,835	$345,875
15 March	Providence	United States	Providence Civic Center	Pixies	13,680 / 13,680	$324,900
17 March	Boston	United States	Boston Garden	Pixies	15,212 / 15,212	$380,300
18 March	East Rutherford	United States	Brendan Byrne Arena	Pixies	19,880 / 19,880	$497,000
20 March	New York City	United States	Madison Square Garden	Pixies	18,179 / 18,179	$454,475
21 March	Albany	United States	Knickerbocker Arena	Pixies	16,258 / 16,258	$398,218
23 March	Montreal	Canada	Montreal Forum	Pixies	—N/a	—N/a
24 March	Toronto	Canada	Maple Leaf Gardens	Pixies	16,015 / 16,015	$387,837
26 March	Richfield	United States	Richfield Coliseum	Pixies	18,083 / 18,083	$452,075
27 March	Auburn Hills	United States	The Palace of Auburn Hills	Pixies	21,064 / 21,064	$526,600
30 March	Minneapolis	United States	Target Center	Pixies	18,256 / 18,256	$447,272
31 March	Rosemont	United States	Rosemont Horizon	Pixies	17,329 / 17,329	$433,225
5 April	Dallas	United States	Reunion Arena	Pixies	17,999 / 17,999	$447,175
6 April	Houston	United States	The Summit	Pixies	16,342 / 16,342	$418,875
7 April	Austin	United States	Frank Erwin Center	Pixies	16,768 / 16,768	$416,950
10 April	Tempe	United States	ASU Activity Center	Pixies	13,302 / 13,302	$332,550
12 April	Los Angeles	United States	Los Angeles Memorial Sports Arena	Pixies	31,692 / 31,692	$792,300
13 April	Los Angeles	United States	Los Angeles Memorial Sports Arena	Pixies	31,692 / 31,692	$792,300
15 April	San Diego	United States	San Diego Sports Arena	Pixies	13,824 / 13,824	$345,600
17 April	Sacramento	United States	ARCO Arena	Pixies	15,893 / 15,893	$397,325
18 April	Oakland	United States	Oakland–Alameda County Coliseum Arena	Pixies	14,431 / 14,431	$360,775
20 April	Tacoma	United States	Tacoma Dome	Pixies	43,977 / 43,977	$1,099,425
21 April	Tacoma	United States	Tacoma Dome	Pixies	43,977 / 43,977	$1,099,425
23 April	Vancouver	Canada	Pacific Coliseum	Pixies	—N/a	—N/a
7 May	Paris	France	Palais Omnisports Bercy	The Fatima Mansions	—N/a	—N/a
9 May	Ghent	Belgium	Flanders Expo	The Fatima Mansions	—N/a	—N/a
11 May	Lyon	France	Halle Tony Garnier	The Fatima Mansions	—N/a	—N/a
12 May	Lausanne	Switzerland	CIG de Malley	The Fatima Mansions	—N/a	—N/a
14 May	San Sebastián	Spain	Velodrome Anoeta	The Fatima Mansions	—N/a	—N/a
16 May	Barcelona	Spain	Palau Sant Jordi	The Fatima Mansions	—N/a	—N/a
18 May	Barcelona	Spain	Palau Sant Jordi	The Fatima Mansions	—N/a	—N/a
21 May	Assago	Italy	Forum di Assago	The Fatima Mansions	—N/a	—N/a
22 May	Assago	Italy	Forum di Assago	The Fatima Mansions	—N/a	—N/a
24 May	Vienna	Austria	Donauinsel	The Fatima Mansions	—N/a	—N/a
25 May	Munich	Germany	Olympiahalle	The Fatima Mansions	—N/a	—N/a
27 May	Zürich	Switzerland	Hallenstadion	The Fatima Mansions	—N/a	—N/a
29 May	Frankfurt	Germany	Festhalle	The Fatima Mansions	—N/a	—N/a
31 May	London	England	Earls Court	The Fatima Mansions	—N/a	—N/a
1 June	Birmingham	England	National Exhibition Centre	The Fatima Mansions	—N/a	—N/a
4 June	Dortmund	Germany	Westfalenhalle	The Fatima Mansions	—N/a	—N/a
5 June	Dortmund	Germany	Westfalenhalle	The Fatima Mansions	—N/a	—N/a
8 June	Gothenburg	Sweden	Scandinavium	The Fatima Mansions	—N/a	—N/a
10 June	Stockholm	Sweden	Globen	The Fatima Mansions	—N/a	—N/a
11 June	Stockholm	Sweden	Globen	The Fatima Mansions	—N/a	—N/a
13 June	Kiel	Germany	Sparkassen-Arena	The Fatima Mansions	—N/a	—N/a
15 June	Rotterdam	Netherlands	Ahoy	The Fatima Mansions	—N/a	—N/a
17 June	Sheffield	England	Sheffield Arena	The Fatima Mansions	—N/a	—N/a
18 June	Glasgow	Scotland	SECC	The Fatima Mansions	—N/a	—N/a
19 June	Manchester	England	GMEX Centre	The Fatima Mansions	—N/a	—N/a
7 August	Hershey	United States	Hersheypark Stadium	WNOC	—N/a	—N/a
12 August	East Rutherford	United States	Giants Stadium	Primus; The Disposable Heroes of Hiphoprisy	109,000 / 109,000	$3,269,790
13 August	East Rutherford	United States	Giants Stadium	Primus; The Disposable Heroes of Hiphoprisy	109,000 / 109,000	$3,269,790
15 August	Washington, D.C.	United States	Robert F. Kennedy Memorial Stadium	Primus; The Disposable Heroes of Hiphoprisy	97,038 / 97,038	$2,765,583
16 August	Washington, D.C.	United States	Robert F. Kennedy Memorial Stadium	Primus; The Disposable Heroes of Hiphoprisy	97,038 / 97,038	$2,765,583
18 August	Saratoga Springs	United States	Saratoga Gaming and Raceway	Primus; The Disposable Heroes of Hiphoprisy	30,227 / 35,000	$906,810
20 August	Foxborough	United States	Foxboro Stadium	Primus; The Disposable Heroes of Hiphoprisy	148,736 / 148,736	$4,427,100
22 August	Foxborough	United States	Foxboro Stadium	Primus; The Disposable Heroes of Hiphoprisy	148,736 / 148,736	$4,427,100
23 August	Foxborough	United States	Foxboro Stadium	Primus; The Disposable Heroes of Hiphoprisy	148,736 / 148,736	$4,427,100
25 August	Pittsburgh	United States	Three Rivers Stadium	Primus; The Disposable Heroes of Hiphoprisy	39,586 / 39,586	$1,028,783
27 August	Montreal	Canada	Olympic Stadium	Primus; The Disposable Heroes of Hiphoprisy	42,210 / 43,000	$1,010,864
29 August	New York City	United States	Yankee Stadium	Primus; The Disposable Heroes of Hiphoprisy	104,100 / 104,100	$3,123,000
30 August	New York City	United States	Yankee Stadium	Primus; The Disposable Heroes of Hiphoprisy	104,100 / 104,100	$3,123,000
2 September	Philadelphia	United States	Veterans Stadium	Primus; The Disposable Heroes of Hiphoprisy	88,684 / 88,684	$2,691,880
3 September	Philadelphia	United States	Veterans Stadium	Primus; The Disposable Heroes of Hiphoprisy	88,684 / 88,684	$2,691,880
5 September	Toronto	Canada	Exhibition Stadium	Primus; The Disposable Heroes of Hiphoprisy	108,043 / 108,043	$3,021,488
6 September	Toronto	Canada	Exhibition Stadium	Primus; The Disposable Heroes of Hiphoprisy	108,043 / 108,043	$3,021,488
9 September	Pontiac	United States	Pontiac Silverdome	Primus; The Disposable Heroes of Hiphoprisy	36,740 / 40,680	$1,102,200
11 September	Ames	United States	Cyclone Stadium	Primus; The Disposable Heroes of Hiphoprisy	48,822 / 48,822	$1,452,630
13 September	Madison	United States	Camp Randall Stadium	Big Audio Dynamite II; Public Enemy	62,280 / 62,280	$1,868,400
15 September	Tinley Park	United States	World Music Theatre	Big Audio Dynamite II; Public Enemy	89,307 / 89,307	$2,457,690
16 September	Tinley Park	United States	World Music Theatre	Big Audio Dynamite II; Public Enemy	89,307 / 89,307	$2,457,690
18 September	Tinley Park	United States	World Music Theatre	Big Audio Dynamite II; Public Enemy	89,307 / 89,307	$2,457,690
20 September	St. Louis	United States	Busch Memorial Stadium	Big Audio Dynamite II; Public Enemy	48,054 / 48,054	$1,389,930
23 September	Columbia	United States	Williams–Brice Stadium	Big Audio Dynamite II; Public Enemy	28,305 / 40,136	$776,568
25 September	Atlanta	United States	Georgia Dome	Big Audio Dynamite II; Public Enemy	53,427 / 53,427	$1,602,810
3 October	Miami Gardens	United States	Joe Robbie Stadium	Big Audio Dynamite II; Public Enemy	45,244 / 46,000	$1,289,454
7 October	Birmingham	United States	Legion Field	Big Audio Dynamite II; Public Enemy	35,209 / 41,632	$1,021,061
10 October	Tampa	United States	Tampa Stadium	Big Audio Dynamite II; Public Enemy	41,090 / 42,500	$1,194,407
14 October	Houston	United States	Houston Astrodome	Big Audio Dynamite II; Public Enemy	31,884 / 35,000	$925,560
16 October	Irving	United States	Texas Stadium	The Sugarcubes; Public Enemy	39,514 / 39,514	$1,144,500
18 October	Kansas City	United States	Arrowhead Stadium	The Sugarcubes; The Disposable Heroes of Hiphoprisy	37,867 / 40,000	$1,154,944
21 October	Denver	United States	Mile High Stadium	The Sugarcubes; Public Enemy	54,450 / 54,450	$1,654,390
24 October	Tempe	United States	Sun Devil Stadium	The Sugarcubes; Public Enemy	35,177 / 40,000	$1,055,310
27 October	El Paso	United States	Sun Bowl Stadium	The Sugarcubes; Public Enemy	35,564 / 39,500	$1,066,920
30 October	Los Angeles	United States	Dodger Stadium	The Sugarcubes; Public Enemy	108,357 / 108,357	$3,250,710
31 October	Los Angeles	United States	Dodger Stadium	The Sugarcubes; Public Enemy	108,357 / 108,357	$3,250,710
3 November	Vancouver	Canada	BC Place Stadium	The Sugarcubes; Public Enemy	77,448 / 83,000	$2,143,567
4 November	Vancouver	Canada	BC Place Stadium	The Sugarcubes; Public Enemy	77,448 / 83,000	$2,143,567
7 November	Oakland	United States	Oakland-Alameda County Coliseum	The Sugarcubes; Public Enemy	59,800 / 59,800	$1,793,700
10 November	San Diego	United States	Jack Murphy Stadium	The Sugarcubes; Public Enemy	33,575 / 55,000	$999,765
12 November	Whitney	United States	Sam Boyd Stadium	The Sugarcubes; Public Enemy	27,774 / 37,011	$860,994
14 November	Anaheim	United States	Anaheim Stadium	The Sugarcubes; Public Enemy	48,640 / 48,640	$1,462,800
21 November	Mexico City	Mexico	Palacio de los Deportes	Big Audio Dynamite II	83,068 / 83,068	$4,148,756
22 November	Mexico City	Mexico	Palacio de los Deportes	Big Audio Dynamite II	83,068 / 83,068	$4,148,756
24 November	Mexico City	Mexico	Palacio de los Deportes	Big Audio Dynamite II	83,068 / 83,068	$4,148,756
25 November	Mexico City	Mexico	Palacio de los Deportes	Big Audio Dynamite II	83,068 / 83,068	$4,148,756

List of 1993 concerts, showing date, city, country, venue, tickets sold, number of available tickets and amount of gross revenue
Date (1993)	City	Country	Venue	Opening act	Attendance	Revenue
9 May	Rotterdam	Netherlands	Feijenoord Stadion	Utah Saints; Claw Boys Claw	—N/a	—N/a
10 May	Rotterdam	Netherlands	Feijenoord Stadion	Einstürzende Neubauten; Claw Boys Claw	—N/a	—N/a
11 May	Rotterdam	Netherlands	Feijenoord Stadion	Claw Boys Claw	—N/a	—N/a
15 May	Lisbon	Portugal	Estádio José Alvalade	Utah Saints	—N/a	—N/a
19 May	Oviedo	Spain	Estadio Carlos Tartiere	Utah Saints; The Ramones	—N/a	—N/a
22 May	Madrid	Spain	Estadio Vicente Calderón	Utah Saints; The Ramones	—N/a	—N/a
26 May	Nantes	France	Stade de la Beaujoire	Urban Dance Squad; Utah Saints	—N/a	—N/a
29 May	Werchter	Belgium	Werchter Festival Ground	Stereo MCs; Urban Dance Squad	—N/a	—N/a
2 June	Frankfurt	Germany	Waldstadion	Stereo MCs; Die Toten Hosen	—N/a	—N/a
4 June	Munich	Germany	Olympiastadion	Stereo MCs; Die Toten Hosen	—N/a	—N/a
6 June	Stuttgart	Germany	Cannstatter Wasen	Stereo MCs; Die Toten Hosen	—N/a	—N/a
9 June	Bremen	Germany	Weserstadion	Stereo MCs; Die Toten Hosen	—N/a	—N/a
12 June	Cologne	Germany	Müngersdorferstadion	Stereo MCs; Die Toten Hosen	—N/a	—N/a
15 June	Berlin	Germany	Olympiastadion	Stereo MCs; Die Toten Hosen	—N/a	—N/a
23 June	Strasbourg	France	Stade de la Meinau	Stereo MCs; The Velvet Underground	—N/a	—N/a
26 June	Paris	France	Hippodrome de Vincennes	Belly; The Velvet Underground	—N/a	—N/a
28 June	Lausanne	Switzerland	Stade Olympique de la Pontaise	The Velvet Underground	—N/a	—N/a
30 June	Basel	Switzerland	St. Jakob Stadium	Stereo MCs; The Velvet Underground	—N/a	—N/a
2 July	Verona	Italy	Stadio Marc'Antonio Bentegodi	An Emotional Fish; Pearl Jam	—N/a	—N/a
3 July	Verona	Italy	Stadio Marc'Antonio Bentegodi	An Emotional Fish; Pearl Jam	—N/a	—N/a
6 July	Rome	Italy	Stadio Flaminio	An Emotional Fish; Pearl Jam	—N/a	—N/a
7 July	Rome	Italy	Stadio Flaminio	An Emotional Fish; Pearl Jam	—N/a	—N/a
9 July	Naples	Italy	Stadio San Paolo	Ligabue; The Velvet Underground	—N/a	—N/a
12 July	Turin	Italy	Stadio Delle Alpi	An Emotional Fish; Ligabue	—N/a	—N/a
14 July	Marseille	France	Stade Vélodrome	An Emotional Fish	—N/a	—N/a
17 July	Bologna	Italy	Stadio Renato Dall'Ara	An Emotional Fish; Galliano	—N/a	—N/a
18 July	Bologna	Italy	Stadio Renato Dall'Ara	An Emotional Fish; Galliano	—N/a	—N/a
23 July	Budapest	Hungary	Népstadion	Ákos	—N/a	—N/a
27 July	Copenhagen	Denmark	Gentofte Stadion	PJ Harvey; Stereo MCs	—N/a	—N/a
29 July	Oslo	Norway	Valle Hovin Stadion	PJ Harvey; Stereo MCs	—N/a	—N/a
31 July	Stockholm	Sweden	Stockholm Olympic Stadium	PJ Harvey; Stereo MCs	—N/a	—N/a
3 August	Nijmegen	Netherlands	Goffertpark	PJ Harvey; Stereo MCs	—N/a	—N/a
7 August	Glasgow	Scotland	Celtic Park	Utah Saints; PJ Harvey	—N/a	—N/a
8 August	Glasgow	Scotland	Celtic Park	Utah Saints; Stereo MCs	—N/a	—N/a
11 August	London	England	Wembley Stadium	PJ Harvey; Big Audio Dynamite II	—N/a	—N/a
12 August	London	England	Wembley Stadium	PJ Harvey; Big Audio Dynamite II	—N/a	—N/a
14 August	Leeds	England	Roundhay Park	Marxman; Stereo MCs	—N/a	—N/a
18 August	Cardiff	Wales	Cardiff Arms Park	Utah Saints; Stereo MCs	—N/a	—N/a
20 August	London	England	Wembley Stadium	Utah Saints; Stereo MCs	—N/a	—N/a
21 August	London	England	Wembley Stadium	Björk; Stereo MCs	—N/a	—N/a
24 August	Cork	Ireland	Páirc Uí Chaoimh	Engine Alley; Utah Saints	—N/a	—N/a
27 August	Dublin	Ireland	RDS Arena	Marxman; The Golden Horde	72,000 / 72,000	$2,413,370
28 August	Dublin	Ireland	RDS Arena	Scary Éire; Stereo MCs	72,000 / 72,000	$2,413,370
12 November	Melbourne	Australia	Melbourne Cricket Ground	Big Audio Dynamite II; Kim Salmon and the Surrealists	—N/a	—N/a
13 November	Melbourne	Australia	Melbourne Cricket Ground	Big Audio Dynamite II; Kim Salmon and the Surrealists	—N/a	—N/a
16 November	Adelaide	Australia	Football Park	Big Audio Dynamite II; Kim Salmon and the Surrealists	—N/a	—N/a
20 November	Brisbane	Australia	Queensland Sport and Athletics Centre	Big Audio Dynamite II; Kim Salmon and the Surrealists	—N/a	—N/a
26 November	Sydney	Australia	Sydney Football Stadium	Big Audio Dynamite II; Kim Salmon and the Surrealists	—N/a	—N/a
27 November	Sydney	Australia	Sydney Football Stadium	Big Audio Dynamite II; Kim Salmon and the Surrealists	—N/a	—N/a
1 December	Christchurch	New Zealand	Lancaster Park	3Ds; Big Audio Dynamite II	—N/a	—N/a
4 December	Auckland	New Zealand	Western Springs Stadium	3Ds; Big Audio Dynamite II	—N/a	—N/a
9 December	Tokyo	Japan	Tokyo Dome	Big Audio Dynamite II	—N/a	—N/a
10 December	Tokyo	Japan	Tokyo Dome	Big Audio Dynamite II	—N/a	—N/a

== See also ==
- List of highest-grossing concert tours
- List of most-attended concert tours
- Timeline of U2
