= SJ =

SJ or S.J. may refer to:

== Arts and entertainment ==
- SJ (rapper), British rapper and member of the UK drill group OFB
- SJ (singer), American folk-pop singer
- Shankar–Jaikishan, Indian composer duo
- Super Junior, a famous South Korean boyband
- Samurai Jack, an American animated television series
- Superjail!, an American animated television series

== Government, law, and politics ==
- Solicitors Journal, a legal periodical published in the United Kingdom
- Summary judgment, a legal motion
- Social justice, a movement for equality
- Secretary for Justice, in case citations

== Military ==
- Sitara-e-Jurat, Pakistan's third highest military award
- SJ radar, a type of S band (10-cm) radar set used on American submarines during the Second World War

== Places ==
- Saint John, New Brunswick, a city in New Brunswick, Canada
- San Jose, California, a city in California, United States
- San Juan, Puerto Rico, the capital of and largest city in Puerto Rico
- South Jersey, the southern half of the state of New Jersey
- St. John's, Newfoundland and Labrador, the capital city in Newfoundland and Labrador, Canada
- Subang Jaya, a residential hub in Klang Valley, Malaysia
- Suure-Jaani, Estonia
- Svalbard and Jan Mayen (ISO 3166-1 country code: SJ), two northern territories of Norway

== Sports ==
- San Jose Sharks, a National Hockey League (NHL) team, based in San Jose, California
- Show Jumping, a sport on horseback
- Strafe-jumping, a trickjumping technique

== Transportation ==
- Jeep Cherokee (SJ), 1974-1983
- Jeep SJ platform
- Suzuki SJ 410 or 413, part of the Suzuki Jimny series
- SJ AB, the Swedish national railway passenger operator 2001—
  - Statens Järnvägar (Swedish State Railways), the government agency from which SJ AB was formed, 1887–2000
- Sriwijaya Air (IATA code: SJ), an Indonesia-based low-cost airline
- Freedom Air (IATA code: SJ), a defunct Air New Zealand Group low-cost airline
- The tail code for aircraft from Seymour Johnson Air Force Base
- SuperJet, a personal water craft produced by Yamaha Motors

== Other uses ==
- Sj-sound, a sound in northern Germanic languages with disputed articulation location
- Shijian, a series of satellites built and operated by China
- ScratchJr, a programming language for children ages 5–7
- A member of the Society of Jesus (the Jesuits)
- S.J., initials used by Samuel Johnson
