= SJ (singer) =

American singer-songwriter

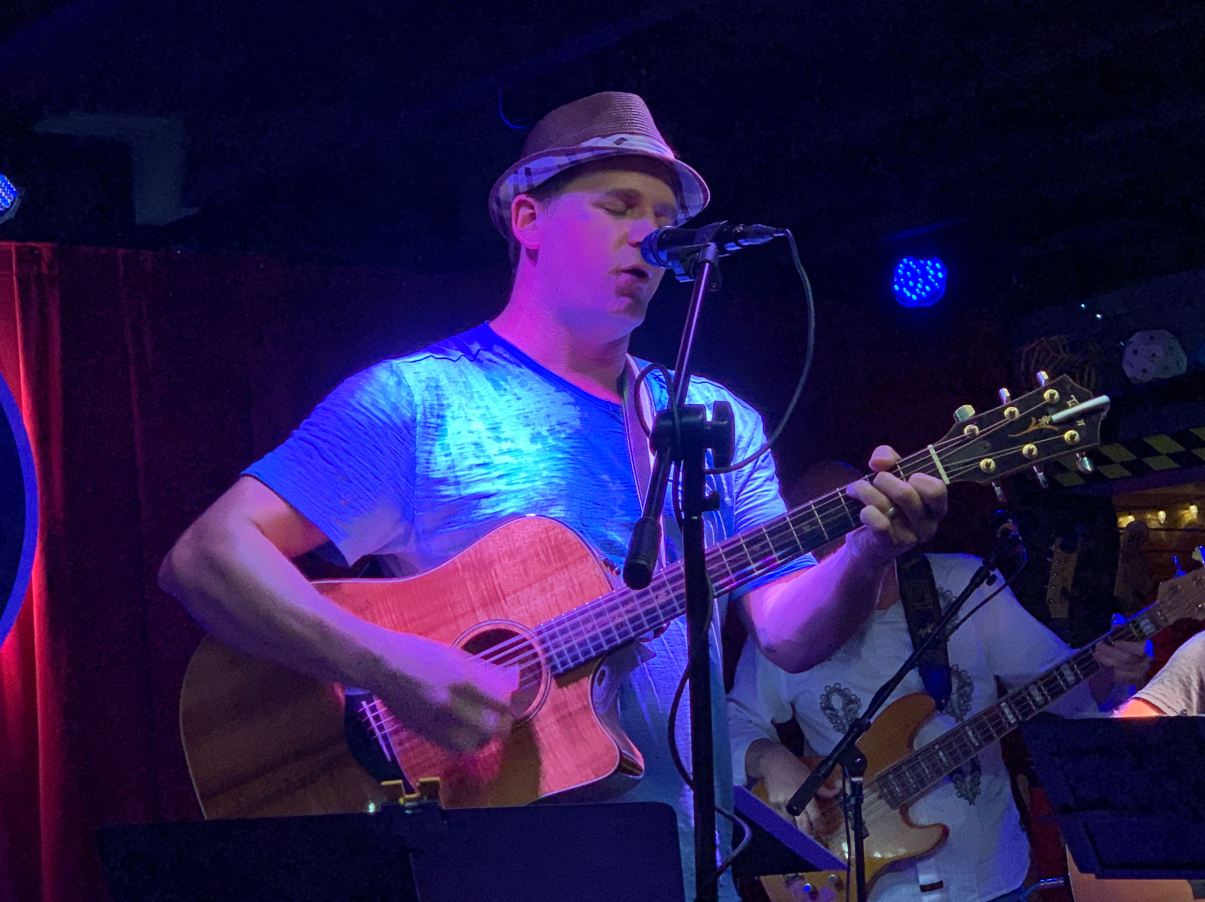
- SJ, folk-alternative and pop singer, performing at Open Mike's in Florida in 2018.

Background information
- Also known as: SJ
- Born: Scott Jablonski; 1977 (age 48–49); Cleveland, Ohio, US
- Origin: Melbourne, Florida
- Genres: Folk-alternative; folk pop; acoustic rock
- Occupations: Singer-songwriter; musician; performing artist; attorney
- Instruments: Vocals; acoustic guitar
- Years active: 2009–present
- Label: Acoustic Soul Records
- Website: www.acousticsoulgroup.com

Scott Jablonski (known by his stage name SJ) is an American singer-songwriter, performing artist, and attorney based in South Florida. As a recording artist, SJ has released two studio albums and one live album through his independent record label, Acoustic Soul Records. In 2011, the singer was nominated by SiriusXM's The Coffee House as "Discovery of the Year", and his song "I Like You" appeared on several airplay charts in the US in 2012. He has opened for acts like Ed Sheeran and Pentatonix.

== Early life and education ==
Jablonski was born in Cleveland, Ohio. He graduated from Gannon University in 1999 with a bachelor's degree in political science and foreign language studies. He also played varsity soccer while at the school. In 2004, he earned a master's degree at the University of Pittsburgh's Graduate School of Public and International Affairs. He also earned a JD degree from the school that year.

== Career ==
After graduating from the University of Pittsburgh, Jablonski embarked on a career in law. With Ronald A. Brand, he co-authored Forum Non Conveniens: Past, Present and Future which was published by Oxford University Press in 2008. His legal writings have also appeared in other publications like the Journal of International Law and Politics and the University of Miami Inter-American Law Review, among others.

In 2009, his friends and family heard a demo of a song he had made and urged him to pursue music as a career. He adopted the stage name, "SJ," for that endeavor. In 2010, he founded the Acoustic Soul Group, of which his Acoustic Soul Records is apart. He began releasing songs that year, including "I Like You" which was nominated for a Hollywood Music & Media Award. He was also named a grand finalist in the UK's Festival4TheStars for writing the song. A Spanish version of the song, "Lo Mejor De Mi," won first place in the International Songwriting Competition in the Latin category.

In March 2011, "I Like You" reached the top 10 of FMQB's adult contemporary chart alongside acts like Katy Perry, Bruno Mars, and Train. In May 2011, he released his first commercial studio-recorded EP, Coffee, featuring the songs "I Like You," "Let Me Be," "Coffee," and others. Later in 2011, Sirius XM's The Coffee House station nominated SJ for the "Discovery of the Year" award, and his song, "Coffee," won a Hollywood Music & Media Award. In July 2012, it was announced that Taylor Guitars, Sennheiser, Future Sonics, Gator Cases, Hercules Stands, and Elixir Strings had officially endorsed SJ.

In August 2012, he released his first full-length studio album entitled Coffee: Strong Brew Edition. The album featured all the songs from the 2011 EP, Coffee, with 7 new tracks. Other South Florida artists like Randy Singer, Erica Sommer, and Joshua Stedman were featured on some songs. The album was recorded at Outer Reach Music Studios in Miami. SJ also released an accompanying live album and DVD entitled Coffee: Unfiltered. The song, "Let Me Be," spent over 13 weeks on Mediabase's adult contemporary charts, peaking at number 32.

In September 2012, he was one of 25 finalists nominated for the American Songwriter Coffeehouse Tour competition. In October and November, SJ opened for Pentatonix on 6 dates, concluding his nationwide "Coffee Tour." Later in November, he went on a short Midwest tour. Throughout 2011 and 2012, SJ's songs were played on over 50 adult album alternative and americana radio stations across the country.

In May 2013, SJ opened for Ed Sheeran at SunFest in West Palm Beach, Florida. In September of that year, he opened for Robin Zander of Cheap Trick. In 2014, SJ was named one of 8 semi-finalists in 3 categories for the International Songwriting Competition. Later in 2014, he launched the Covers & Others video series in collaboration with Day's Edge Productions. The goal of the series was to bring awareness to organizations with social, scientific, or environmental initiatives by playing covers of songs over videos related to their work.

== Discography ==
=== Studio albums ===
List of studio albums with selected details
Title	Details
Coffee: Strong Brew Edition	Released: August 14, 2012 (US); Label: Acoustic Soul Records; Formats: CD, Digital download

=== EPs ===
List of EPs with selected album details
Title	Details
Coffee	Released: May 11, 2011 (US); Label: Acoustic Soul Records; Formats: CD, Digital download
Nikki	Released: December 1, 2018 (US); Label: Acoustic Soul Records; Formats: CD, Digital download

=== Live albums ===
List of live albums with selected details
Title	Details
Coffee: Unfiltered	Released: August 14, 2012 (US); Label: Acoustic Soul Records; Formats: CD, DVD, Digital download

=== Singles ===
List of singles, with selected chart positions, showing year released and album name
Title	Year	Peak chart positions		Album
Title	Year	US ACQB	US Mediabase A/C	Album
"I Like You"	2011	10	—	Coffee: Strong Brew Edition
"Let Me Be"	2012	—	32	Coffee: Strong Brew Edition
"—" denotes a single that did not chart or was not released in that territory.

== Recognition and awards ==
Year	Award	Category	Nominee(s)	Result
2010	Hollywood Music & Media Awards	Best Folk/Acoustic Song by Emerging Artist	"I Like You"	Nominated
2011	Hollywood Music & Media Awards	Best Folk/Acoustic Song by Emerging Artist	"Coffee"	Won
2011	Festival4TheStars	Best Singer-Songwriter	SJ and "I Like You"	Finalist
2011	Goodnight Kiss Song Competition	Best Song	"I Like You"	Sixth
2011	International Songwriting Competition	Latin Song	"Lo Mejor De Mi"	Won
2011	UK Songwriting Competition	Acoustic Folk	"Coffee"	Semi-finalist
2011	UK Songwriting Competition	Singer-Songwriter	"I Am"	Finalist
2011	SiriusXM's The Coffee House "Discovery of the Year"	Singer-Songwriter	"I Like You"	Nominated
2011	Music City Awards	Rock	"I Am"	Finalist
2012	International Acoustic Music Awards	Adult Album Alternative	"I Am"	Finalist
2012	USA Songwriting Competition	Pop	"I Am"	Runner-up
2012	Unsigned Only Awards	Adult Album Alternative	"I Am"	Semi-finalist
2012	Unsigned Only Awards	Folk/Singer-Songwriter	"Breathe"	Semi-finalist
2012	Unsigned Only Awards	Folk/Singer-Songwriter	"I Like You"	Finalist; Honorable mention
2012	Unsigned Only Awards	Adult Contemporary	"I Like You"	Semi-finalist
2012	Jango Radio Airplay Holiday Song Contest	Holiday Song	"One Christmas Wish"	Won
2012	American Songwriter Coffee Shop Tour Competition	Singer-Songwriter	SJ	Finalist
2013	International Songwriting Competition	Folk Singer-Songwriter	"Green as Snow"	Semi-finalist
2013	International Songwriting Competition	Adult Album Alternative	"It's Alright"	Semi-finalist
2013	International Songwriting Competition	Performance	"Let Me Be"	Semi-finalist
