= Future Sonics =

American audio equipment manufacturer

- Headquarters: Bristol, Pennsylvania
- Website: www.futuresonics.com

Future Sonics is an American professional audio and consumer earphones company which designs and manufactures its own proprietary MG line of full-range miniature loudspeakers, which are used in all of its products.

== History ==
In-ear personal monitor systems were pioneered in the early 1980s by Marty Garcia of Future Sonics as a solution for vocal fatigue and stress on musicians' ears from excessively loud stage volumes. His first custom-fit earphones were created for Todd Rundgren in 1982. In 1985 the Ear Monitors Brand was launched. Also, in 1985, Rundgren’s Utopia Tour was the first wedge-less stage, and all members were wearing FS Ear MonitorsBrand. The Grateful Dead and The Steve Miller Band were among the early bands to tour with this form of personal monitoring.

Future Sonics Ear Monitors Brand was awarded the TEC Award for Sound Reinforcement Product of the Year in 1992. In 2002, Future Sonics was the OEM (original equipment manufacturer) of the IE3 earphones for Sennheiser USA included with its original Evolution Wireless Systems. That same year, Future Sonics’ Ears EM3, universal earphones, was nominated for a TEC Award. In 2009, Future Sonics marked its 17th year working with the band U2 on their 360° Tour providing earpieces for the band, crew and security.

Future Sonics is an advocate for Hearing health awareness issues and a supporter of H.E.A.R., a non-profit organization dedicated to preventing hearing loss, mainly from loud rock music. Future Sonics' speaker technology is recognized by H.E.A.R. a product offering a full range of sound and performance at low volumes. In 2009 Future Sonics was awarded a Certificate of Excellence from H.E.A.R. for its contributions to Hearing Education and Awareness for Rockers.
