= Nicholas Wayman-Harris =

Nicholas Wayman-Harris (died October 2022) was a British film editor latterly based in Santa Monica, California.

Wayman-Harris worked on music videos with some of the biggest artists in the music world, including Radiohead, U2, Puff Daddy, The Spice Girls, Björk, Blur, Depeche Mode, George Michael, The Verve, Oasis, Kylie Minogue, Thirty Seconds to Mars and OK Go. His vast body of commercial work included major campaigns for Ford Motor Company, Bacardi, Toyota, Nike, AT&T, Audi and Compaq to name but a few.

Following on success from several short films including A Little Worm, Nicholas made his first foray into features on Event Horizon, editing its Visions of Hell sequence. His first full feature was The King is Alive directed by Kristian Levring. Levring was part of the Danish collective who created the influential Dogme movement. The King is Alive was Dogme IV, and featured Jennifer Jason Leigh who won best actress for her role in the film at the Tokyo Film Festival. Nicholas was nominated for the "Best Editing" award at 2002 The Robert Festival (The Danish "Oscars"). The King is Alive was picked as an official selection at the 2002 Cannes Film Festival. A second collaboration with Levring, The Intended, featuring Oscar winners Olympia Dukakis and Brenda Fricker and Oscar nominee Janet McTeer, premiered at the 2003 Toronto International Film Festival.

The film, Sinner directed by Marc Benardout, was awarded Best Feature Narrative at the 41st Brooklyn Arts Council International Film & Video Festival and Grand Jury Best Feature at the Buffalo Niagara Film Festival.

Nicholas worked with the Strause Brothers on the 2010 sci-fi film "Skyline", a fast-paced and visually stunning alien invasion film.

Highly respected by his peers and colleagues, Nicholas's tutelage and generosity at his company NWH Editing Ltd launched the careers of some of today's leading commercial and music video editors.

== Awards ==
- Nominated, Best Editing, Robert Festen (Denmark)

== Filmography ==
=== Film ===
- Aftermath (2017)
- Blood Is Blood (2016)
- Nightingale (2014)
- Snake and Mongoose (2013)
- Skyline (2010)
- Sinner (2007)
- The Rope (2005)
- 16mm Mystery (2004)
- The Intended (2002)
- The King Is Alive (2000)
- A Little Worm (1995)

=== Music video ===
- "Sound & Color" by Alabama Shakes (2015)
- "Kings and Queens" by Thirty Seconds to Mars (2009)
- "Song to Say Goodbye" by Placebo (2006)
- "Nothing Left to Lose" by Mat Kearney (2006)
- "At the Bottom of Everything" by Bright Eyes (2005)
- "Stars and Boulevards" by Augustana (2005)
- "Swing Life Away" by Rise Against (2005)
- "Happy?" by Mudvayne (2005)
- "Stronger" by Trust Company (2005)
- "Break Down the Doors" by Erick Morillo (2004)
- "Cry" by Alex Parks (2004)
- "Hysteria" by Muse (2004)
- "The Bitter End" by Placebo (2003)
- "Dinosaur Adventure 3D" by Underworld (2003)
- "Pagan Poetry" by Björk (2001)
- "Another Chance" by Roger Sanchez (2001)
- "Grounded" by My Vitriol (2001)
- "Dirge" by Death in Vegas (2000)
- "Joy!" by Gay Dad (1999)
- "Come with Me" by Puff Daddy featuring Jimmy Page (1998)
- "Furious Angels" by Rob Dougan (1998)
- "Please" by U2 (1997)
- "Bitter Sweet Symphony" by The Verve (1997)
- "Bruise Pristine" by Placebo (1997)
- "Where the Wild Roses Grow" by Nick Cave and Kylie Minogue (1995)
- "White Lines (Don't Do It)" by Duran Duran (1995)
- "Live Forever" by Oasis (1995)
