= David Kerr (cinematographer) =

English cinematographer

David Kerr is a British cinematographer based in England.

Kerr began his career ironically with an eye for much smaller details. His undergraduate studies in Microbiology at the University of Kent led him to work in Electron Microscopy and Specialized Photography at Oxford University, School of Botany. Leaving the micro behind for the macro world of cinema, he completed his graduate work at the National Film and Television School in Beaconsfield, England.

His commercial work has spanned clients from Grolsch to Sony PlayStation, Peugeot to Shell Gas, Shredded Wheat to Scottish tourism with leading advertising agencies such as Saatchi & Saatchi, J. Walter Thompson, TBWA, and BBDO. In 2002, a campaign he shot for John Smith’s Scottish Courage beer won a Silver Pencil at the prestigious D & AD Global Awards in the UK and was nominated for Best Campaign.

Amidst his work in commercials, Mr. Kerr has also shot several award-winning shorts including A Little Worm with Marc Benardout which won Best Cinematography at the Barcelona Film Festival. He also shot Waters Edge with director Suri Krishnamma which was nominated for Best Short in the 1988 British Academy of Film & Television Arts (BAFTA) and won top prizes at the Bilbao, Budapest, Angers and Chicago Film Festivals respectively. Mr. Kerr also shot other award winning short films including "Eric" 2011 which won Best Short at Marbella International Film Festival 2011 and was nominated Best Cinematography at the Maverick Movie Awards

His feature film debut, Sinner, directed by Marc Benardout, was shot in Los Angeles. It was awarded Best Feature Narrative and Cinematography at the 41st Brooklyn Arts Council International Film & Video Festival and Grand Jury Best Feature at the Buffalo Niagara Film Festival.

== Awards ==
- Best Cinematography, Sinner, 41st Brooklyn Arts Council International Film & Video Festival (2007)
- Best Cinematography, A Little Worm, Barcelona Film Festival (1995)

== Filmography ==
As Director of Photography:

- Sinner (2007)
- A Little Worm (short) (1995)
- In the Time of Angels (short) (1994)
- Waters Edge (short) (1988)
