= Higher Love (disambiguation) =

"Higher Love" is a 1986 song by Steve Winwood, covered by Whitney Houston in 1990, the later version being remade in 2019 by Kygo.

It may also refer to:

- "Higher Love", Alex Vargas song from his 2017 album Cohere
- "Higher Love", Depeche Mode song from their 1993 album Songs of Faith and Devotion
- Higher Love, original title At Sachem Farm, also known as 'Uncorked' and 'Trade Winds', a film
- "Higher Love", a song from the 2025 film Smurfs
- "Higher Love", title of episode 6 of season 2 of the series BoJack Horseman
