= Steven Sills =

American screenwriter and film producer

Steven Sills is an American screenwriter and film producer.

Born on Fort Bliss, an army base in El Paso, Texas, Sills grew up in Bedford, New Hampshire.

Sills attended film school at New York University Tisch School of the Arts. In 1991, he was chosen as a Lew Wasserman Fellow and interned at Universal Studios.

In 1995, Sills was selected as a Henry Luce Scholar and spent a year in Tokyo, Japan, working as a visiting writer/producer at NHK. He remained in Japan for 4 years and worked as a copy editor at The Japan Times, a freelance magazine writer and an expat stand-up comic.

His feature screenwriting debut, Sinner, was awarded Best Narrative Feature by the 41st Brooklyn Arts Council International Film and Video Festival and Best Feature Film Award at the 2007 Buffalo Niagara Film Festival. It was also accepted as an official selection in the 2007 Vail Film Festival, 2007 Newport Beach Film Festival, and 2007 Garden State Film Festival, and the 2007 Boston International Film Festival.

Sills is a distant relative of Sylvanus Bowser.

Sills resides in Newburyport, Massachusetts with his wife, Melissa.

== Awards ==
- Best Screenplay, 2007 Newport Beach Film Festival
- Best Screenplay, 41st Brooklyn Arts Council International Film & Video Festival

== Filmography ==
As writer:

- Sinner (2007)

As producer:

- Finding Fritztown (2020)
- Sironia (2010)
- Sinner (2007)
- A&E Biography of the Year (2004)
- Pink (2006) for adicolor, with director Charlie White
- Asia Live, NHK (1996–97)
