= Sinner (2007 film) =

- US Promotional Poster
- Directed by: Marc Benardout
- Written by: Steven Sills
- Produced by: Steven Sills; Marc Benardout
- Starring: Nick Chinlund; Georgina Cates; Michael E. Rodgers; Tom Wright; Brad Dourif
- Cinematography: David Kerr
- Edited by: Nicholas Wayman-Harris
- Music by: Pinar Toprak
- Distributed by: Matson Films
- Release dates: March 26, 2007 (Buffalo Niagara Film Festival); April 3, 2009 (United States)
- Running time: 88 minutes
- Country: United States
- Language: English

Sinner is a 2007 drama film directed by Marc Benardout and starring Nick Chinlund, Georgina Cates, Michael E. Rodgers, Tom Wright, and Brad Dourif.

The film debuted on Showtime on April 3, 2009, and was released on DVD in June 2009 in North America by Matson Films.

== Plot ==
A Catholic priest, Father Anthony Romano (Nick Chinlund), intervenes with the police when his colleague attacks a drifter named Lil (Georgina Cates). When Anthony reluctantly provides her asylum in his rectory, the brash hustler soon discovers a secret he has hidden from his diocese and parish. Through this unlikely muse, Anthony finds a path to regain his honor and calling in a post-scandal world where priests are guilty until proven innocent.

== Cast ==
- Nick Chinlund as Anthony
- Georgina Cates as Lil
- Michael E. Rodgers as Stephen
- Brad Dourif as Caddie
- Tom Wright as Officer Thomas

== Festivals ==
Sinner was chosen as an official selection in the 2007 Vail Film Festival, 2007 Newport Beach Film Festival, 41st Annual Brooklyn Arts Council Film and Video Festival, 2007 Palm Beach International Film Festival, 2007 Garden State Film Festival, 2007 Buffalo Niagara Film Festival, and the 2007 Boston International Film Festival.

== Awards ==
- Best Feature Film (Narrative), 41st Annual Brooklyn Arts Council International Film & Video Festival
- Best Feature Film, 2007 Buffalo Niagara Film Festival
- Best Director, 2007 Boston International Film Festival
- Best Screenplay, 2007 Newport Beach Film Festival
- Best Actor, 41st Annual Brooklyn Arts Council International Film & Video Festival
- Best Actress, 41st Annual Brooklyn Arts Council International Film & Video Festival
- Best Screenplay, 41st Annual Brooklyn Arts Council International Film & Video Festival
- Best Cinematography, 41st Annual Brooklyn Arts Council International Film & Video Festival
