= Staring at the Sun (U2 song) =

1997 single by U2

Single by U2

from the album Pop
- B-side: "North and South of the River"; "Your Blue Room"
- Released: 14 April 1997
- Genre: Alternative rock; Britpop
- Length: 4:37
- Label: Island
- Composer: U2
- Lyricists: Bono and The Edge
- Producer: Flood

U2 singles chronology
"Discothèque" (1997)	"Staring at the Sun" (1997)	"Last Night on Earth" (1997)

Music videos
- "Official Music Video" on YouTube; "Miami Version" on YouTube

"Staring at the Sun" is a song by Irish rock band U2. It is the fifth track on their 1997 album, Pop, and was released by Island Records as the album's second single on 14 April 1997. The song peaked at number three on the UK Singles Chart, number one in Canada and Iceland and number 26 on the US Billboard Hot 100. In the US, it topped the Billboard Modern Rock Tracks and Triple-A charts. It also reached the top 10 in Finland, Ireland, Italy, New Zealand and Norway.

== Background ==
The song was written with the line "Stuck together with God's glue", which was taken directly from the title of the album by the Irish band Something Happens, who are good friends with U2. The band felt the song was a potential "anthem to rival 'One'." A new mix of "Staring at the Sun" was released for the compilation, The Best of 1990–2000. During the mid-2002 recording sessions in which "Electrical Storm" and "The Hands That Built America" were recorded, parts for four U2 songs were re-recorded, including "Staring at the Sun". The song has been compared to the work of Oasis.

A kaleidoscope bearing the single's logo in gold was distributed to promote the single.

== Critical reception ==
Kevin Courtney from Irish Times commented, "Could this be U2's riposte to "Champagne Supernova", an overt attempt to steal some thunder back from Oasis and regain their rightful place as anthem makers supreme? "Staring at the Sun" has shades of psychedelia, lazy sunny afternoons watching a Waterloo sunset, and it's as big, bold and Beatlesque as anything Noel Gallagher has ever knocked out. The Edge picks out Pictures of Matchstick Men on his guitar, while Bono sings of "Summer stretching on the grass ... Summer dresses pass . .." A front runner for U2's big Summer 97 hit." British magazine Music Week gave it top score with five out of five and named it Single of the Week, writing, "Possibly the most obvious single on Pop, this track is awash with a melancholy that's amplified by The Edge's plangent, keening guitar signature. Big." David Sinclair from The Times said, "God is good, but will He listen? Bono asks in this solid return to traditional U2 territory. Does He have a choice?"

=== Live performances ===
"Staring at the Sun" was played at most of the PopMart Tour shows. However, during the first concert at Las Vegas, U2 failed to time the song correctly and had to start over. Bono singing at the wrong tempo was to blame for the mistake. The song was performed acoustically for most of the rest of that tour. It had several appearances on the Elevation Tour, being the only Pop song to be performed on all three legs of the Elevation Tour. Sometimes it also appeared as a snippet in "Discothèque". It was performed as a live staple of the North American leg of the 2018 Experience + Innocence Tour."

It appeared in the live videos/recordings Please: PopHeart Live EP, "Please" single, PopMart: Live from Mexico City, Hasta la Vista Baby! and U2 Go Home: Live from Slane Castle, Ireland.

== Formats and track listings ==
7-inch and cassette release
No.	Title	Length
1.	"Staring at the Sun"	4:37
2.	"North and South of the River"	4:38

CD release 1
No.	Title	Length
1.	"Staring at the Sun"	4:37
2.	"North and South of the River"	4:38
3.	"Your Blue Room"	5:28

CD release 2
No.	Title	Length
1.	"Staring at the Sun" (Monster Truck mix)	5:06
2.	"Staring at the Sun" (Sad Bastards mix)	6:19
3.	"North and South of the River"	4:38
4.	"Staring at the Sun" (Lab Rat mix)	5:05

== Charts ==
=== Weekly charts ===
Chart (1997)	Peak position
Australia (ARIA)	23
Austria (Ö3 Austria Top 40)	25
Belgium (Ultratop 50 Flanders)	46
Canada Top Singles (RPM)	1
Canada Adult Contemporary (RPM)	20
Canada Rock/Alternative (RPM)	1
Europe (Eurochart Hot 100)	21
Finland (Suomen virallinen lista)	4
France (SNEP)	49
Germany (GfK)	41
Iceland (Íslenski Listinn Topp 40)	1
Ireland (IRMA)	4
Italy (Musica e dischi)	9
Italy Airplay (Music & Media)	3
Netherlands (Dutch Top 40)	22
Netherlands (Single Top 100)	19
New Zealand (Recorded Music NZ)	4
Norway (VG-lista)	9
Scottish Singles Sales (Official Charts)	3
Sweden (Sverigetopplistan)	26
Switzerland (Schweizer Hitparade)	29
UK Singles (Official Charts)	3
US Billboard Hot 100	26
US Adult Alternative Airplay (Billboard)	1
US Adult Pop Airplay (Billboard)	13
US Alternative Airplay (Billboard)	1
US Dance Singles Sales (Billboard)	23
US Mainstream Rock Airplay (Billboard)	2
US Pop Airplay (Billboard)	22

=== Year-end charts ===
Chart (1997)	Position
Canada Top Singles (RPM)	5
Canada Rock/Alternative (RPM)	8
Iceland (Íslenski Listinn Topp 40)	4
UK Singles (OCC)	139
US Mainstream Rock Tracks (Billboard)	19
US Modern Rock Tracks (Billboard)	27
US Top 40/Mainstream (Billboard)	87
US Triple-A (Billboard)	16

== Release history ==
Region	Date	Format(s)	Label(s)	Ref.
United States	11 March 1997	Contemporary hit radio	Island	
United Kingdom	14 April 1997	CD; cassette	Island	
Canada	15 April 1997	CD	Island	
United States	15 April 1997	7-inch vinyl; CD; cassette	Island	
Japan	25 April 1997	CD	Island	

== See also ==
- List of covers of U2 songs – Staring at the Sun
- List of RPM number-one singles of 1997 (Canada)
- List of RPM Rock/Alternative number-one singles (Canada)
- Number one modern rock hits of 1997
