= Where the Streets Have No Name =

Single by U2

from the album The Joshua Tree
- B-side: "Race Against Time"; "Silver and Gold"; "Sweetest Thing"
- Released: 31 August 1987
- Recorded: 1986
- Studio: Windmill Lane (Dublin)
- Genre: Rock
- Length: 4:46 (single version); 5:36 (album version)
- Label: Island
- Composer: U2
- Lyricist: Bono
- Producers: Daniel Lanois; Brian Eno

U2 singles chronology
"I Still Haven't Found What I'm Looking For" (1987)	"Where the Streets Have No Name" (1987)	"In God's Country" (1987)

Music video
- "Where the Streets Have No Name" on YouTube

"Where the Streets Have No Name" is a song by Irish rock band U2. It is the opening track from their 1987 album The Joshua Tree and was released as the album's third single in August 1987. The song's hook is a repeating guitar arpeggio using a delay effect, played during the song's introduction and again at the end. Lead vocalist Bono wrote the lyrics in response to the notion that one can predict a person's religion and income based on the street where they live, particularly in Belfast. During the band's difficulties recording the song, producer Brian Eno considered erasing the song's tapes to have them start from scratch.

"Where the Streets Have No Name" was praised by critics and became a commercial success, peaking at number thirteen on the US Billboard Hot 100, number fourteen in Canada, number ten in the Netherlands, and number four on the UK Singles Chart. The song has remained a staple of their live act since the song debuted in 1987 on The Joshua Tree Tour. The song was performed on a Los Angeles rooftop for the filming of its music video, which won the Grammy Award for Best Performance Music Video at the 31st Annual Grammy Awards.

== Writing and recording ==
The music for "Where the Streets Have No Name" originated from a demo that guitarist The Edge composed the night before U2 resumed The Joshua Tree sessions. In an upstairs room at Melbeach House—his newly purchased home—he used a four-track tape machine to record an arrangement of keyboards, bass, guitar, and a drum machine. Realising that the album sessions were approaching the end and that the band were short on exceptional live songs, he wanted to "conjure up the ultimate U2 live-song", so he imagined what he would like to hear at a future U2 show if he were a fan. After finishing the rough mix, he felt he had come up with "the most amazing guitar part and song of [his] life". With no one in the house to share the demo with, he recalls dancing around and punching the air in celebration.

Although the band liked the demo, it was difficult for them to record the song. Bassist Adam Clayton said, "At the time it sounded like a foreign language, whereas now we understand how it works". The arrangement, with two time signature shifts and frequent chord changes, was rehearsed many times, but the group struggled to get a performance they liked. According to co-producer Daniel Lanois, "that was the science project song. I remember having this massive schoolhouse blackboard, as we call them. I was holding a pointer, like a college professor, walking the band through the chord changes like a fucking nerd. It was ridiculous." Co-producer Brian Eno estimates that half of the album sessions were spent trying to record a suitable version of "Where the Streets Have No Name". The band worked on a single take for weeks, but as Eno explained, that particular version had a lot of problems with it and the group continued trying to fix it up. Through all of their work, they had gradually replaced each instrument take until nothing remained from the original performance.

So much time had been spent on "screwdriver work" that Eno thought it would be best to start from scratch. His idea was to "stage an accident" and have the song's tapes erased. He said that this was not to force abandonment of the song, but rather that it would be more effective to start again with a fresh performance. At one point, Eno had the tapes cued up and ready to be recorded over, but this erasure never took place; according to engineer Flood, fellow engineer Pat McCarthy returned to the control room and upon seeing Eno ready to erase the tapes, dropped the tray of tea he was carrying and physically restrained Eno.

The studio version of the song was compiled from several different takes. It was one of several songs mixed by Steve Lillywhite in the final months of recording The Joshua Tree. Drummer Larry Mullen Jr. later said of the song, "It took so long to get that song right, it was difficult for us to make any sense of it. It only became a truly great song through playing live. On the record, musically, it's not half the song it is live."

== Composition ==
"Where the Streets Have No Name"
The opening riff, a repeating six-note arpeggio, is modulated with a delay effect.

"Where the Streets Have No Name" is played in the key of D major at a tempo of 126 beats per minute. The introduction and outro are played in a 3/4 time signature, while the remainder of the song is in a common 4/4 signature. The song opens with an instrumental section, starting with chorale-like sustained synthesiser notes. The guitar fades in after 40 seconds; this part consists of a repeated "chiming" six-note arpeggio. A "dotted eighth" delay effect is used to "play" each note in the arpeggio twice, thus creating a rich sound. The bass and drums enter at 1:10.

The introduction, following a I–IV–I–IV–vi–V–I chord progression, creates a "wall of sound", as described by Mark Butler, against which the vocals emerge after nearly two minutes. The guitar part played for the remainder of the song features The Edge strumming percussive sixteenth notes. The bass and drums continue in regular eighth and sixteenth notes, respectively, while Bono's vocal performance, in contrast, varies greatly in its timbre, ("he sighs; he moans; he grunts; he exhales audibly; he allows his voice to crack") as well as timing by his usage of rubato to slightly offset the notes he sings from the beat.

This development reaches a climax during the first chorus at the line "burning down love" (A–G–F♯–D); the melody progresses through a series of scale degrees that lead to the highest note in the song, the A4 at "burning". In later choruses, Bono sings "blown by the wind" with the same melody, stretching the same note even longer. After the third chorus, the song's outro is played, the instrumentation reverting to the same state as it was in the introduction, with a six-note guitar arpeggio played against sustained synthesiser notes.

"'[Where] the Streets Have No Name' was the perfect introduction. It is one of the most extraordinary ideas, only matched by The Doors' 'Break on Through (To the Other Side)' as a throw-down to an audience. Do you want to go there? Because if you do, I'm ready to go there with you, to that other place. Call it what you like, a place of imagination, where there are no limitations."

— Bono

=== Lyrics ===
The lyrics were inspired by a story that Bono heard about Belfast, Northern Ireland, where a person's religion and income were evident by the street on which they lived. He contrasted this with the anonymity he felt when visiting Ethiopia, saying: "the guy in the song recognizes this contrast and thinks about a world where there aren't such divisions, a place where the streets have no name. To me, that's the way a great rock 'n' roll concert should be: a place where everyone comes together... Maybe that's the dream of all art: to break down the barriers and the divisions between people and touch upon the things that matter the most to us all." Bono wrote the lyrics while on a humanitarian visit to Ethiopia with his wife, Ali Hewson; he first wrote them down on an airsickness bag while staying in a village.

According to him, the song is ostensibly about "Transcendence, elevation, whatever you want to call it." Bono, who compared many of his lyrics prior to The Joshua Tree to "sketches", said that "'Where the Streets Have No Name' is more like the U2 of old than any of the other songs on the LP, because it's a sketch—I was just trying to sketch a location, maybe a spiritual location, maybe a romantic location. I was trying to sketch a feeling."

The open-ended nature of the lyrics has led to many interpretations. Journalist Michael Campbell believed the lyrics send "a message of hope" and wish for a "world that is not divided by class, wealth, race, or any other arbitrary criterion". With regard to the place Bono was referring to in the song, he said, "I'm not sure, really, about that. I used to think it was Belfast..." Journalist Niall Stokes believes the title was influenced by Bono's and his wife Ali's visit to Ethiopia as volunteer aid-workers. Bono has expressed mixed opinions about the open-ended lyrics: "I can look at it now and recognize that [the song] has one of the most banal couplets in the history of pop music. But it also contains some of the biggest ideas. In a curious way, that seems to work. If you get any way heavy about these things, you don't communicate. But if you're flip or throwaway about it, then you do. That's one of the paradoxes I've come to terms with."

In a 2017 interview, Bono said he still felt that the song's lyrics were incomplete, stating "lyrically it's just a sketch and I was going to go back and write it out". He expressed regret for rhyming "hide" with "inside". However, the Edge disagreed with his comments, stating that he loves the song and that Bono is "very hard on himself". Eno responded by commending the "incomplete" lyrics because he feels "they allow the listener to finish them".

== Release ==
Originally, the third single from The Joshua Tree was meant to be the song "Red Hill Mining Town", but "Where the Streets Have No Name" was released instead, in August 1987. The single was released on 7-inch, 12-inch, cassette and CD single formats. Three B-sides were featured on the single, including "Race Against Time", "Silver and Gold", and "Sweetest Thing", except for the 7-inch release, which only featured the latter two tracks. The 12-inch single featured "Race Against Time" on side A of the record (despite being a "B-side"), and the cassette single featured all four tracks on both sides of the tape. Although not as successful as the album's first two singles, the song did chart well. In the U.S., the song peaked at number 13 on the Billboard Hot 100 and number 11 on the Album Rock Tracks charts. The song reached number four on the UK Singles Chart, and it topped the Irish Singles Chart.

=== Music video ===
The Grammy Award-winning music video, featuring the band's performance on a Los Angeles rooftop

The video opens with an aerial shot of a city block in Downtown Los Angeles, with voice-overs from radio DJs saying U2 will be filming a music video in public, and large crowds are expected to be in attendance. Police show up to the set and inform the band's crew of the security issue that the video shoot is causing. Two minutes into the video, U2 perform "Where the Streets Have No Name" atop the roof of a one-story building, with large crowds of people in the audience on the adjacent streets. Towards the end of the song, Bono informs the crowd that the video shoot is being shut down, which is met by booing from the crowd, while police officers approach the roof.

The video for "Where the Streets Have No Name" was directed by Meiert Avis and produced by Michael Hamlyn and Ben Dossett. The band attracted over 1,000 people during the video's filming, which took place on the rooftop of a liquor store at 7th Street and Main Street in Downtown Los Angeles on 27 March 1987. The band's performance on a rooftop in a public place was a reference to the Beatles' final concert, as depicted in the 1970 film Let It Be.

"The object was to close down the streets. If there's one thing people in LA hate, it's streets closing down, and we've always felt bands should shake things up. We achieved it because the police stopped us filming. Were we worried about being arrested? Not at the time..."

— Adam Clayton

During the shoot U2 played an eight-song set, which included four performances of "Where the Streets Have No Name". Prior to filming, a week was spent reinforcing the roof of the liquor store to ensure that it would not collapse if it were to be intruded by a group of fans. A backup generator was put on the roof so the shooting could continue in the event that the authorities shut off the power on the primary generator, which happened during filming.

The depiction of the police attempting to shut down the filming due to safety concerns actually happened during filming, just as seen in the video. Hamlyn was almost arrested following a confrontation with the police. According to Avis, the events depicted in the video show what actually happened that day "almost in real time", and that "getting busted was an integral part of the plan." Band manager Paul McGuinness revealed in 2007 that much of the confrontation with the police was exaggerated; the group were hoping to get shut down by the authorities in order to dramatise the music video, but the police continually gave them extensions for shooting the video. The Cecil Hotel is featured prominently in the background of the video. Although the video is of a live performance, the audio used is from the studio-recorded version of the song. The video won the Grammy Award for Best Performance Music Video at the 1989 Grammy Awards.

=== B-sides ===
"Race Against Time" was released on the 12-inch, cassette, and CD versions of the single. The song developed from the band's interest in urban funk, and was described by The Edge as "a kind of Afro-rhythmic piece" and "a study in rhythm." The bass riff in the song, inspired by the bodhrán, was played by The Edge, but stemmed from some of Clayton's unused bass parts. Mullen's drum part was recorded in a single take. The song is primarily an instrumental piece but does contain some lyrics inspired by Bono's trip to Ethiopia after Live Aid and his witnessing firsthand the famine in occurrence; these lyrical references include Bono singing in an Ethiopian language and following it with the phrase "Race against time". Bono said of the song, "It reminds me of the desert. The desert is so empty, but it aches with a strange kind of fullness." John Hutchinson of Musician magazine described the song as having an "African flavour" and as being reminiscent of Peter Gabriel. The track was used in the 1987 Miami Vice episode "Child's Play", and is the only one of the single's B-sides that was never played live.

"Silver and Gold" was written in support of the Artists United Against Apartheid project, which protested the South African apartheid. In 1985, Bono participated in Steven Van Zandt's anti-apartheid Sun City project and spent time with Keith Richards and Mick Jagger of The Rolling Stones. When Richards and Jagger played blues, Bono was embarrassed by his lack of familiarity with the genre, as most of U2's musical knowledge began with punk rock in their youth in the mid-1970s. Bono realised that U2 "had no tradition", and he felt as if they "were from outer space". This inspired him to write the blues-influenced song "Silver and Gold", which he recorded with Richards and Ronnie Wood. It was re-recorded by U2 for the "Where the Streets Have No Name" single while the band returned to Dublin in May 1987 during a break between the first and second legs of The Joshua Tree Tour. The song was described by Musician as "tough and raw, with Bono in husky and confident voice, underpinned by a sinuous bass line, and with The Edge demonstrating his newfound prowess in blues-based guitar". "Silver and Gold" was played live on The Joshua Tree Tour several times, one performance of which was featured on the band's 1988 album and rockumentary, Rattle and Hum. Both the studio recording and the Sun City versions were later featured on the bonus disc of the 20th anniversary edition of The Joshua Tree. The studio version was also included on the limited edition B-sides bonus disk of the band's first compilation album in 1998, The Best of 1980–1990.

"Sweetest Thing" was written by Bono as an apology to his wife Ali for forgetting her birthday. The song opens with a short piano piece before the rest of the band begins to play. Some of Bono's lyrics have been described as reminiscent of John Lennon. The Edge described it as "a beautiful song... which is pop as it should be—not produced out of existence, but pop produced with a real intimacy and purity", also noting that "It's very new for us." It was re-recorded with some lyrical alterations and released in 1998 as a single in its own right for The Best of 1980–1990. Hot Press editor Niall Stokes stated that this track, along with "Race Against Time", is "an indicator of what U2 might have made instead of The Joshua Tree."

== Reception ==
Upon the release of The Joshua Tree, critics praised "Where the Streets Have No Name". Steve Morse of The Boston Globe noted the "bell-like tones from the Edge fram[e] a search for heaven" and along with the subsequent track on the album, "I Still Haven't Found What I'm Looking For", these songs showed how the group were "pilgrims still on a quest; not preachers who claim to have found answers". The Bergen Record echoed these sentiments, saying the tracks demonstrated how the band was on a personal and spiritual quest. Rolling Stone called it "assertive rock" in their review of The Joshua Tree. The San Diego Union-Tribune said of "Where the Streets Have No Name", "the music charges, like someone fleeing for life". The Washington Post said the track is "a bit oblique lyrically, but the implications are clear in Bono's resolute delivery, Dave (the Edge) Evan's quavering guitar, Adam Clayton's cathedral bass and Larry Mullen's rolling thunder drums". Cash Box said that it's an "achingly beautiful rocker" with "incredible raw emotion and power."

NME lauded the song as the opening track by saying the album "starts by spitting furiously". The publication praised Bono's impassioned singing and The Edge's guitar playing, which transformed the instrument into "something more than an endlessly abused piece of wood". The review commented that the "last ten seconds are breathtakingly beautiful". The Rocket wrote that the song builds a "wall of sound" that Bono's vocals cut through with a "wail of desperation, as the lyrics agonize the need for personal spirituality". The reviewer compared the opening riff to Simple Minds' "Ghostdancing". Reviewing The Joshua Tree, Stephen Thomas Erlewine of AllMusic called the song an "epic opener". The service's Steve Huey, in a review of the song, praised its "insistent, propulsive rhythmic drive and anthemic chorus", qualities he singled out for making it a fan favorite. He called the song the "perfect album-opener", crediting the "slow build of its arrangement toward a climactic peak". Huey also called Bono's delivery "passionate and grandiose" and "his commitment to the material unshakable". He believed the combination of his vocals and the band's "sonic power" is what gave U2 its "tremendous force".

== Live performances ==
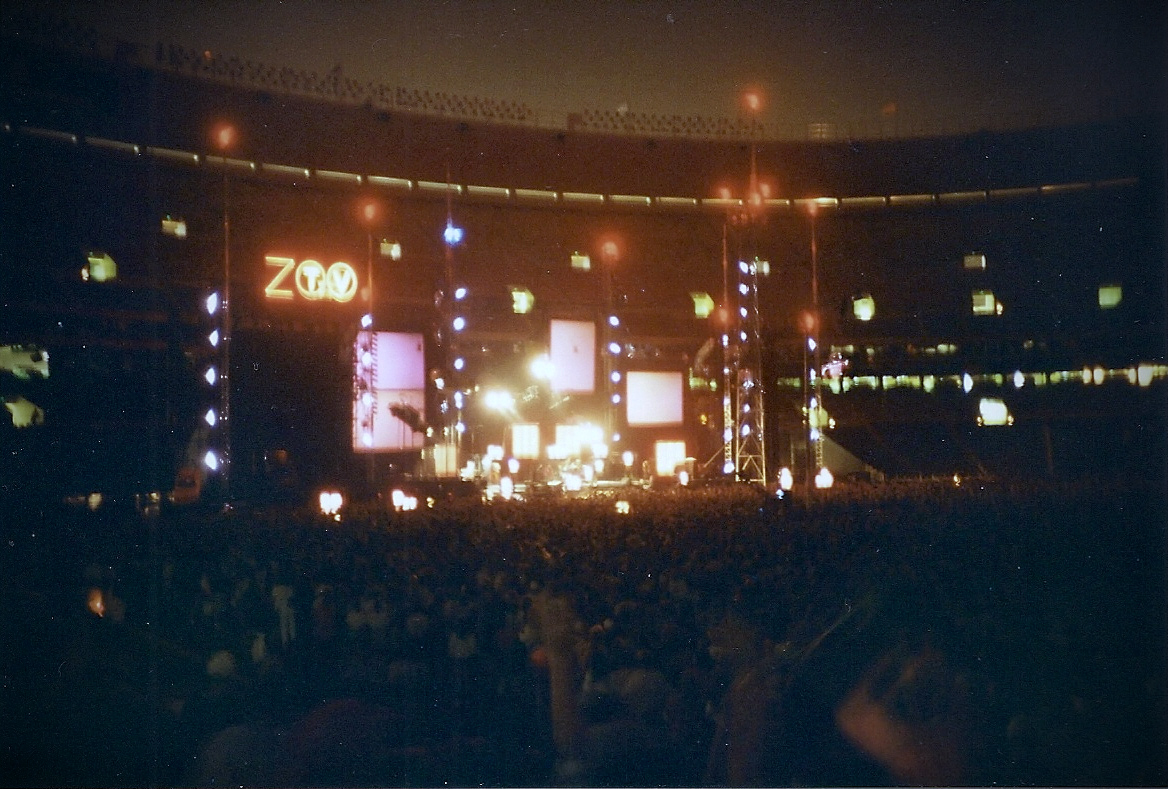
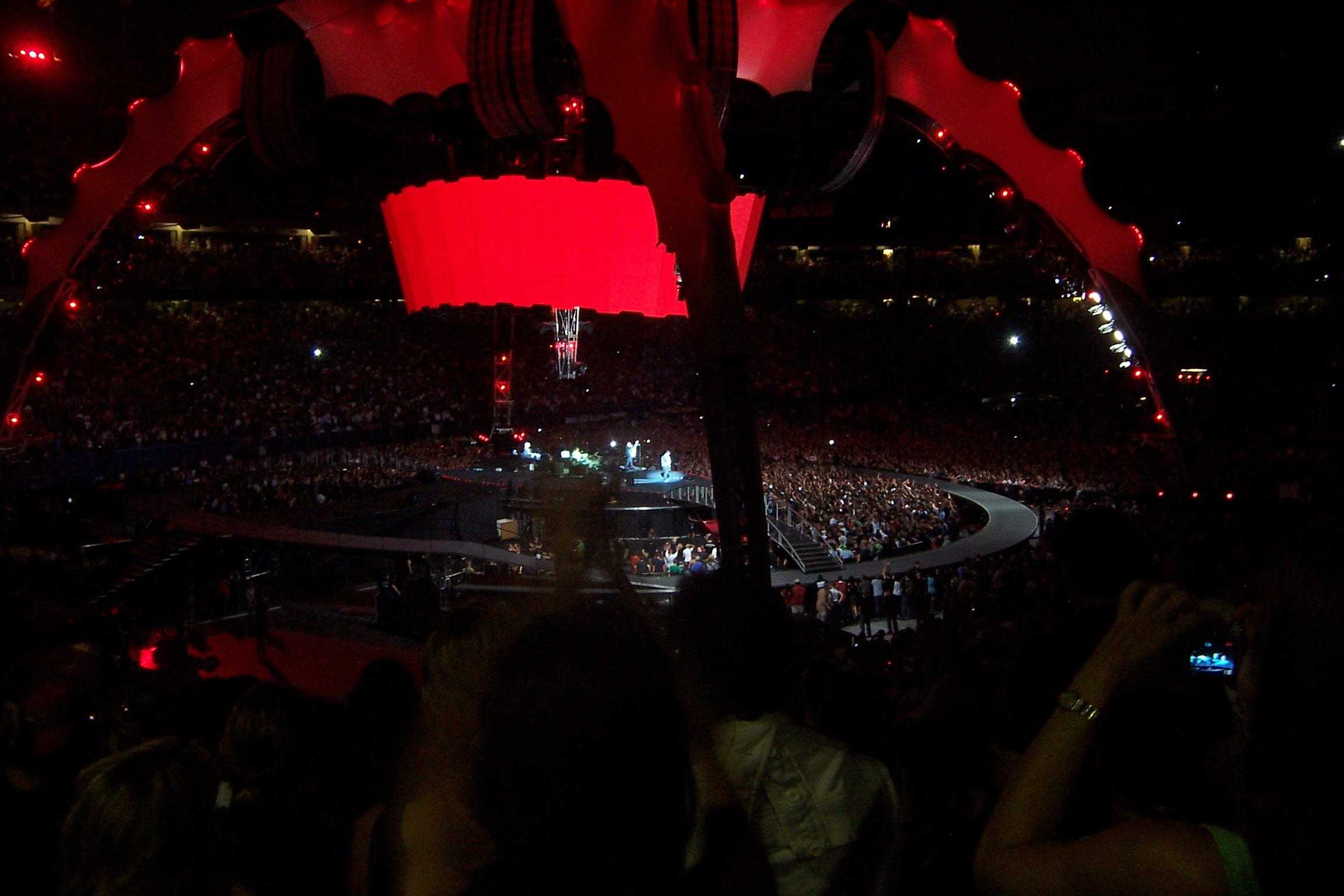
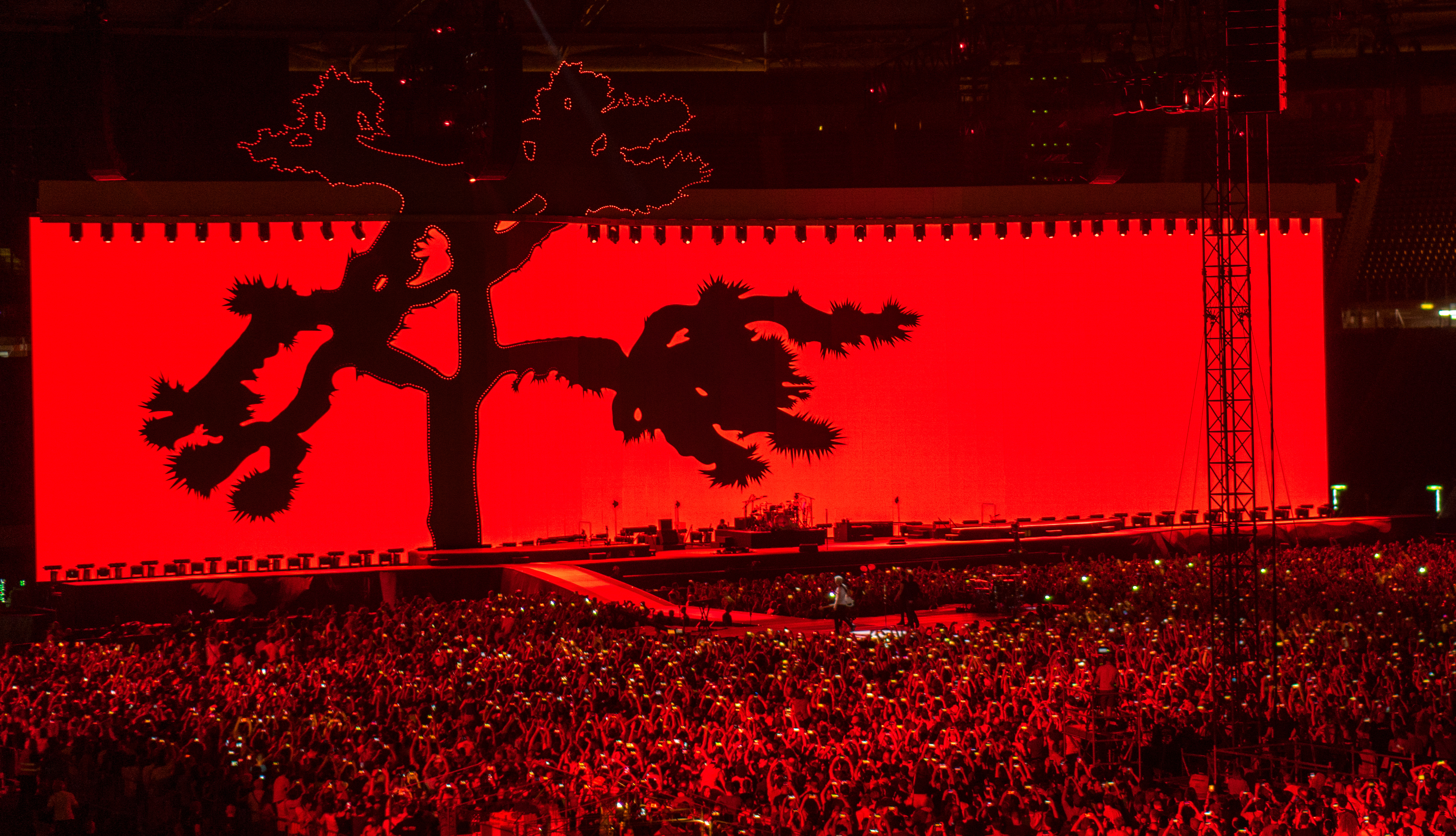
Red lighting across all the video screens has become a recurring feature of live performances of the song, shown here from a 1992 Zoo TV Tour show, a 2009 360° Tour show, and a Joshua Tree Tour 2017 show

The song has since been played at nearly every full-length concert that U2 has headlined, totaling upwards of 900 performances as of 2017. The song is widely regarded as one of the group's most popular live songs. Bono said of it, "We can be in the middle of the worst gig in our lives, but when we go into that song, everything changes. The audience is on its feet, singing along with every word. It's like God suddenly walks through the room."

"Where the Streets Have No Name" made its concert debut on 2 April 1987 at Arizona State University Activity Center in Tempe, Arizona, on the opening night of The Joshua Tree Tour. A version featuring an extended introduction was performed on the closing nights of the third leg of The Joshua Tree tour, again in Tempe, Arizona, on December 19 & 20, 1987, and footage from the performance was featured in the Rattle and Hum film. For the rest of The Joshua Tree Tour, "Where the Streets Have No Name" was most often used to open concerts. Fans and critics responded favourably to the song in a live setting. The San Diego Union-Tribune wrote that, "From the lofty sonic opening strains of [the song], this audience was up, ecstatic and inflamed." NME wrote that the song is one such occasion where "the power afforded their songs is scary", noting that during the song's opening, "the arena ERUPTS". In other reviews, the song was called: "uplifting", "exhilarating", and "powerful". Out of the 109 shows during The Joshua Tree Tour, "Streets" was played at all except 12 of the concerts. During the Lovetown Tour which took place in 1989 and the beginning of 1990, "Streets" was only left out of the set list at one of the 47 concerts.

The song was performed at every show on the 1992–1993 Zoo TV Tour. Concerts from this tour were elaborate multimedia spectacles that Bono performed as a variety of characters, but for the end of the main set, the group reverted to playing classics, including "Where the Streets Have No Name", straight. Some of these performances of the song were accompanied by footage of the group in the desert from The Joshua Tree's photo shoot. The video was speeded up for humorous effect—NME described the effect as giving it a "silly, Charlie Chaplin quality"—and Bono often acknowledged his younger self on the video screens. This video would make a return during performances on the 2010 and 2011 legs of the U2 360° Tour. Some of the Zoo TV performances of the song had a more electronic dance music arrangement that bore a resemblance to the Pet Shop Boys' synthpop cover of the song (titled "Where the Streets Have No Name (I Can't Take My Eyes off You)"). Bono parodied this by occasionally adopting the deadpan vocal style used in the Pet Shop Boys' interpretation. Critics welcomed the song in the group's set list: The Independent said the song "induces instant euphoria, as U2 do what they're best at, slipping into epic rock mode, playing music made for the arena". In two other local newspaper reviews, critics praised the song's inclusion in a sequence of greatest hits.

For the PopMart Tour of 1997–1998, U2 returned to the electronic dance arrangement they occasionally played on the Zoo TV Tour. The set's massive video screen displayed a video that Hot Press described as an "astonishing, 2001-style trip into the heart of a swirling, psychedelic tunnel that sucks the audience in towards a horizontal monolith". Near the end of the song, peace doves were shown on the screen and bright beams of light flanking the set's golden arch were projected upwards. Hot Press said the effect transformed the stadium into a "UFO landing site".

Shortly before the third leg of the Elevation Tour, the September 11 attacks occurred in New York City and Washington, D.C. During the band's first show in New York City following the attacks, the band performed "Where the Streets Have No Name", and when the stage lights illuminated the audience, the band saw tears streaming down the faces of many fans. The experience was one inspiration for the song "City of Blinding Lights". The band paid tribute to the 9/11 victims during their performance of the song at the Super Bowl XXXVI halftime show on 3 February 2002. The performance featured the names of the September 11 victims projected onto a large white banner behind the band, and concluded with Bono opening up his jacket to reveal the US flag sewn into the lining. U2's appearance was later ranked at the top of Sports Illustrated's list of "Top 10 Super Bowl Halftime Shows".

For the 2005-2006 Vertigo Tour, the group originally considered dropping the song from their set lists, but Mullen and Clayton successfully argued against this. All 131 of the Vertigo Tour concerts featured a performance of the song, which were accompanied by the stage's LED video curtains displaying African flags. On the tour's opening night, this reminded Bono that he had originally written the lyrics in an Ethiopian village. He thought this visual accompaniment made the song come full circle, saying, "And here it was, nearly twenty years later, coming back to Africa, all the stuff about parched lands and deserts making sense for the first time." The song was also played at the preview screening of the band's 2008 concert film U2 3D at the 2007 Cannes Film Festival. At the Glastonbury Festival 2010, The Edge accompanied rock band Muse for a live cover version of the track, later playing it with U2 while headlining Glastonbury in 2011.

During the Joshua Tree Tour 2017, "Where the Streets Have No Name" leads off the middle act of the show, the sequential playing of the Joshua Tree album. It is accompanied by the first of several short films depicting desert landscapes that were created by photographer Anton Corbijn.

Live performances of "Where the Streets Have No Name" appear in the concert video releases Rattle and Hum, Zoo TV: Live from Sydney (1994), and PopMart: Live from Mexico City (1998), as well as the respective audio releases of the latter two concerts, Zoo TV Live and Hasta la Vista Baby! U2 Live from Mexico City. A second version from the PopMart Tour was featured on Please: PopHeart Live EP in 1997, and later on the U.S. "Please" single. A live recording from Boston during the Elevation Tour was featured in the concert film Elevation 2001: Live from Boston, and on the "Walk On" and "Electrical Storm" singles. The 2003 concert video and album U2 Go Home: Live from Slane Castle, Ireland featured another performance from the Elevation Tour, and later performances were featured in the concert films Vertigo 2005: Live from Chicago and U2 3D (Vertigo Tour), and 2010's U2 360° at the Rose Bowl (U2 360° Tour). The 2004 digital album, Live from the Point Depot, contains a performance from the Lovetown Tour, only available as part of The Complete U2 digital box set.

== Legacy ==
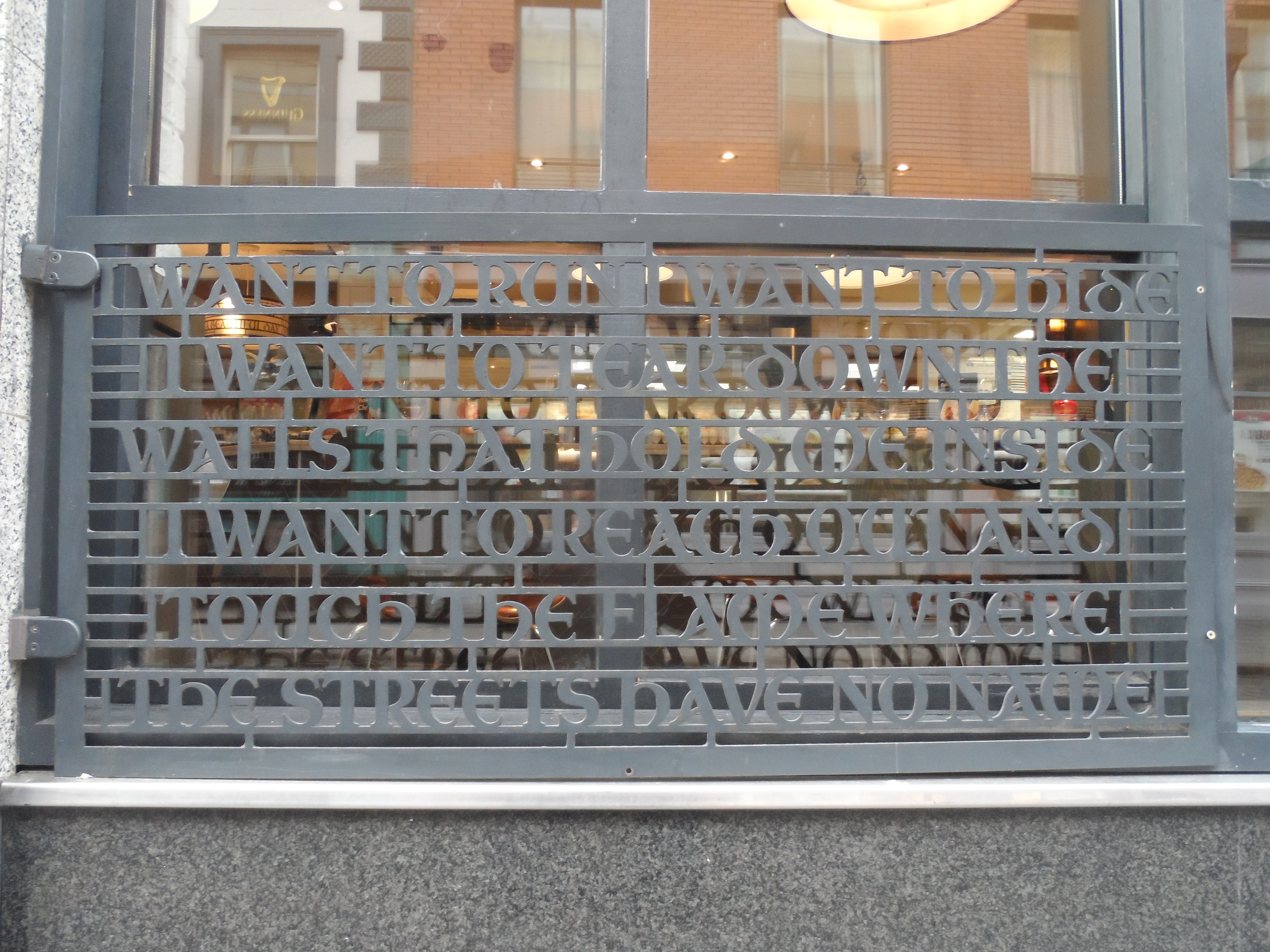
Ironwork displaying lyrics from "Where the Streets Have No Name" at a Dublin pub

In 2002, Q magazine named "Where the Streets Have No Name" the 16th-"most exciting tune ever". The following year, Q ranked the song at number 459 in a special issue of the "1001 Best Songs Ever". Three years later, the magazine's readers voted the track the 43rd-greatest song in history. Rolling Stone ranked the song at number 28 on its list of the "100 Greatest Guitar Songs of All Time". In a 2010 poll by fan site @U2, approximately 29% of 4,800 respondents named "Where the Streets Have No Name" as their favourite song from The Joshua Tree, ranking it as the most popular song from the album. Consequence of Sound ranked the song 63rd on its 2012 list of the "100 Greatest Songs of All Time". That same year, Slant Magazine published a list of its "100 Best Singles of the 1980s" and placed "Where the Streets Have No Name" 63rd. In 2014, NME ranked the song 404th on its list of the "500 Greatest Songs of All Time". In 2019, Rolling Stone ranked the song number six on their list of the 50 greatest U2 songs, and in 2020, The Guardian ranked the song number one on their list of the 40 greatest U2 songs. In 2022, New York Magazine's website Vulture ranked the song at number one in its list of all 234 U2 songs. This song was featured in Universal's 2021 computer animated film Sing 2, for which Bono voiced Clay Calloway, one of the main characters.

== Track listing ==
No.	Title	Writer(s)	Producer	Length
1.	"Where the Streets Have No Name" (single version)	U2	Daniel Lanois, Brian Eno	4:46
2.	"Race Against Time"	U2	U2, Daniel Lanois, Brian Eno	4:04
3.	"Silver and Gold"	Bono	U2	4:36
4.	"Sweetest Thing"	U2	U2, Daniel Lanois, Brian Eno	3:03

== Credits and personnel ==
U2

- Bono – lead vocals
- The Edge – guitar; backing vocals (single version only)
- Adam Clayton – bass guitar
- Larry Mullen Jr. – drums

Additional performers

- Brian Eno – Yamaha DX7 synthesizers

Technical

- Daniel Lanois and Brian Eno – producer
- Flood – recording
- Pat McCarthy – additional engineering
- Steve Lillywhite – mixing
- Mark Wallis – mix engineering

== Charts ==
=== Weekly charts ===
Weekly chart performance for "Where the Streets Have No Name"
Chart (1987–1988)	Peak Position
Australia (Kent Music Report)	27
Belgium (Ultratop 50 Flanders)	19
Canada RPM Top 100	11
Germany (GfK)	44
Ireland (IRMA)	1
Italy (Musica e dischi)	15
Italy Airplay (Music & Media)	10
Netherlands (Dutch Top 40)	10
Netherlands (Single Top 100)	7
New Zealand Singles Chart	1
UK Singles (Official Charts)	4
US Billboard Hot 100	13
US Billboard Album Rock Tracks	11
US Cash Box Top 100	16

=== Year-end charts ===
1987 year-end chart performance for "Where the Streets Have No Name"
Chart (1987)	Position
New Zealand (Recorded Music NZ)	38

== Certifications ==
Certifications for "Where the Streets Have No Name"
Region	Certification	Certified units/sales
Italy (FIMI) sales since 2009	Gold	35,000^{‡}
New Zealand (RMNZ)	Platinum	30,000^{‡}
Spain (Promusicae)	Gold	30,000^{‡}
United Kingdom (BPI)	Platinum	600,000^{‡}
^{‡} Sales+streaming figures based on certification alone.

== See also ==
- List of cover versions of U2 songs § Where the Streets Have No Name
