= Sweetest Thing =

1998 single by U2

Single by U2

from the album The Best of 1980–1990
- Released: 19 October 1998
- Genre: Pop rock
- Length: 3:03 (single mix); 3:06 (original version)
- Label: Island
- Songwriter: U2
- Producers: Steve Lillywhite, with Daniel Lanois and Brian Eno

U2 singles chronology
"Mofo" (1997)	"Sweetest Thing" (1998)	"Beautiful Day" (2000)

Music video
- "Sweetest Thing" on YouTube

"Sweetest Thing" is a song by Irish rock band U2. It was originally released as a B-side on the "Where the Streets Have No Name" single in 1987. The song was later re-recorded and re-released as a single in October 1998 for the band's compilation album The Best of 1980–1990.

"Sweetest Thing" became a number-one hit in Ireland, Canada, and Iceland and reached the top 10 in several countries, including Australia, New Zealand, Spain, Sweden, and the United Kingdom. In the United States, the song peaked at number 63 on the Billboard Hot 100 and number nine on the Billboard Modern Rock Tracks chart.

== Writing and recording ==
The song was written by Bono as an apology to his wife, Ali Hewson, for forgetting her birthday during The Joshua Tree sessions.

In 1998, a new version of the song was recorded for inclusion on the group's greatest hits compilation The Best of 1980–1990. Producer Steve Lillywhite spent five days with the band to re-record vocals and guitar parts.

At Ali's request, profits from the single went to her favoured charity, Chernobyl Children International.

== Release ==
A version by New York gospel choir, The New Voices of Freedom, appears on the soundtrack to the 1988 Bill Murray film Scrooged. It was recorded following U2's performance of "I Still Haven't Found What I'm Looking For" with the choir at Madison Square Garden, which appears on the band's 1988 album Rattle and Hum.

To promote the release of the single in 1998, Island Records distributed "Sweetest Thing" chocolate bars, wrapped to look like the single, throughout Europe. They have become a very valuable collector's item among U2 fans during the 2000s. The song reached number one in Canada, Iceland, and Ireland, number three in the United Kingdom, number six in Australia, number 63 on the US Billboard Hot 100, number nine on the Billboard Modern Rock Tracks chart, and number 31 on the Billboard Mainstream Rock Tracks chart.

== Live performances ==
The song made its live debut on the opening night of the 2001 Elevation Tour, and was played occasionally over the first and second legs. It was then not played again until the 2015 Innocence + Experience Tour, where once again it only made occasional appearances over the course of the tour. It also made a few appearances in the acoustic section of the 2023–2024 Las Vegas residency U2:UV Achtung Baby Live at Sphere.

Performances on the Elevation Tour featured Bono playing the piano parts while The Edge played electric guitar. On the Innocence + Experience Tour, it was played on the e-stage in a stripped-down version, with The Edge playing acoustic guitar and Bono joining in on the piano about halfway through the song. During the band's 2023–2024 concert residency U2:UV Achtung Baby Live at Sphere, it was played with The Edge on acoustic guitar while Bono joined in halfway through the song on piano.

== Music video ==
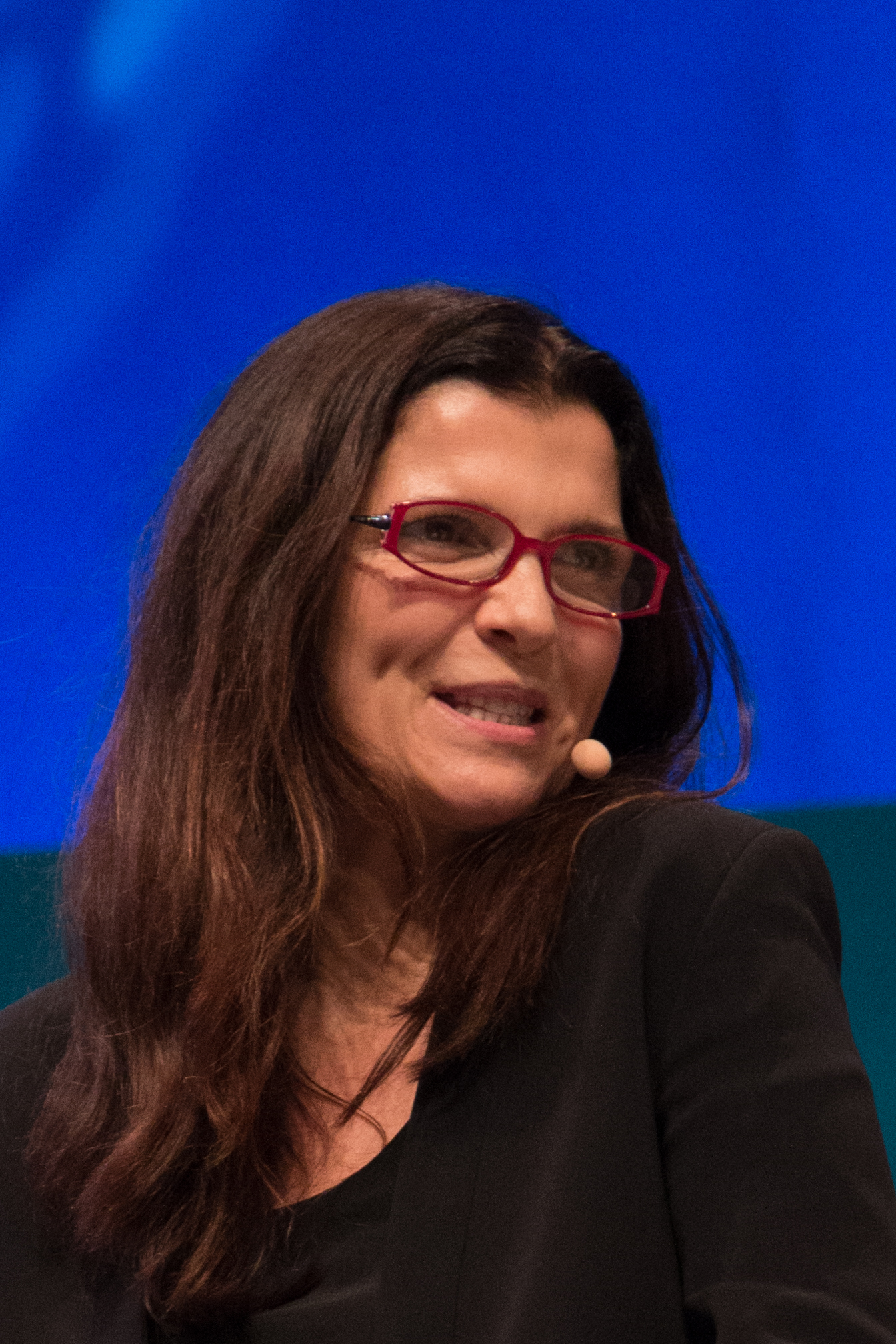
Bono's wife, Ali Hewson, appears in the music video

The video was directed by Kevin Godley. It features Bono taking Hewson on a carriage ride along the Georgian mile in Dublin, from Fitzwilliam Place onto Upper Fitzwilliam Street, enlisting various performers along the way in an effort to apologise to her. The performers featured include Riverdance, Boyzone, Steve Collins, the Artane Boys Band, Chippendales dancers, and the Celtic Knights. The other members of U2 — The Edge, Adam Clayton, and Larry Mullen Jr. — appear in the video, as do Norman Hewson (Bono's brother) and Dik Evans (The Edge's brother).

== Track listings ==
UK cassette single and European CD single
No.	Title	Length
1.	"Sweetest Thing" (single mix)	3:00
2.	"Stories for Boys" (live in Boston, Massachusetts, 6 March 1981)	3:02

UK and Australian CD1
No.	Title	Length
1.	"Sweetest Thing" (single mix)	3:00
2.	"Twilight" (live from Red Rocks Amphitheatre, Morrison, Colorado, 5 June 1983)	4:29
3.	"An Cat Dubh/Into the Heart" (live from Red Rocks Amphitheatre, Morrison, Colorado, 5 June 1983)	7:14

The back cover lists the third track simply as a live version of "An Cat Dubh".

UK and Australian CD2
No.	Title	Length
1.	"Sweetest Thing" (single mix)	3:00
2.	"Stories for Boys" (live in Boston, Massachusetts, 6 March 1981)	3:02
3.	"Out of Control" (live in Boston, 6 March 1981)	4:25

Japanese mini-CD single
No.	Title	Length
1.	"Sweetest Thing" (single mix)	3:00
2.	"With or Without You"	4:55

== Personnel ==
U2

- Bono – lead vocals
- The Edge – piano, guitar, backing vocals
- Adam Clayton – bass guitar
- Larry Mullen Jr. – drums

Additional personnel

- (Uncredited musicians) – strings

== Charts ==
=== Weekly charts ===
Weekly chart performance for "Sweetest Thing"
Chart (1998–1999)	Peak position
Australia (ARIA)	6
Austria (Ö3 Austria Top 40)	7
Belgium (Ultratop 50 Flanders)	23
Belgium (Ultratop 50 Wallonia)	33
Canada (Nielsen SoundScan)	1
Canada Top Singles (RPM)	1
Canada Adult Contemporary (RPM)	5
Denmark (IFPI)	6
Europe (Eurochart Hot 100)	3
Finland (Suomen virallinen lista)	6
France (SNEP)	18
Germany (GfK)	21
Greece (IFPI)	4
Hungary (Mahasz)	3
Iceland (Íslenski Listinn Topp 40)	1
Ireland (IRMA)	1
Italy (Musica e dischi)	2
Italy Airplay (Music & Media)	1
Netherlands (Dutch Top 40)	9
Netherlands (Single Top 100)	7
New Zealand (Recorded Music NZ)	3
Norway (VG-lista)	4
Scottish Singles Sales (Official Charts)	2
Spain (AFYVE)	2
Sweden (Sverigetopplistan)	6
Switzerland (Schweizer Hitparade)	28
UK Singles (Official Charts)	3
US Billboard Hot 100	63
US Adult Alternative Airplay (Billboard)	4
US Adult Pop Airplay (Billboard)	12
US Alternative Airplay (Billboard)	9
US Mainstream Rock Airplay (Billboard)	31

=== Year-end charts ===
1998 year-end chart performance for "Sweetest Thing"
Chart (1998)	Position
Australia (ARIA)	55
Canada Top Singles (RPM)	98
Canada Adult Contemporary (RPM)	60
Europe (Eurochart Hot 100)	47
Iceland (Íslenski Listinn Topp 40)	37
Sweden (Hitlistan)	79
UK Singles (OCC)	69
US Adult Top 40 (Billboard)	86
US Modern Rock Tracks (Billboard)	91

1999 year-end chart performance for "Sweetest Thing"
Chart (1999)	Position
Canada Top Singles (RPM)	65
Canada Adult Contemporary (RPM)	73
US Adult Top 40 (Billboard)	34
US Modern Rock Tracks (Billboard)	42
US Triple-A (Billboard)	14

2001 year-end chart performance for "Sweetest Thing"
Chart (2001)	Position
Canada (Nielsen SoundScan)	109

2002 year-end chart performance for "Sweetest Thing"
Chart (2002)	Position
Canada (Nielsen SoundScan)	172

=== Decade-end charts ===
Decade-end chart performance for "Sweetest Thing"
Chart (1990–1999)	Position
Canada (Nielsen SoundScan)	95

== Certifications ==
Certifications and sales for "Sweetest Thing"
Region	Certification	Certified units/sales
Australia (ARIA)	Gold	35,000^{^}
New Zealand (RMNZ)	Platinum	30,000^{‡}
Sweden (GLF)	Gold	15,000^{^}
United Kingdom (BPI)	Gold	400,000^{‡}
^{^} Shipments figures based on certification alone.^{‡} Sales+streaming figures based on certification alone.

== Release history ==
Release dates and formats for "Sweetest Thing"
Region	Date	Format(s)	Label(s)	Ref(s).
United States	29 September 1998	Contemporary hit radio	Island	
United Kingdom	19 October 1998	CD; cassette	Island	
Canada	20 October 1998	CD	Island	
Japan	28 October 1998	Mini-CD	Island	
