= Matson Films =

American film distributor

- Anywhere Road logo
- Industry: Film production and distribution
- Founded: 2004
- Headquarters: Oakland, California, United States
- Key people: Richard Matson

Matson Films is an American independent film distributor based in San Francisco. Founded in 2004, it specializes in the distribution, production and sales of independent feature films. Matson Films released the award-winning (Toronto Film Festival, Gen Art Film Festival, U.S. Comedy Arts Festival) comedy It's All Gone Pete Tong to 30 markets in April 2005, and in 2009 released the award-winning drama Sinner.

== Releases ==
- Gurukulam (2014)
- Sinner (2009)
- Towncraft (2007)
- Snowblind (2006)
- The World's Best Prom (2006)
- It's All Gone Pete Tong (2005)
