= Vincent Riotta =

British actor

Vincenzo Riotta
- Born: 14 October 1959 (age 66); Hertford, England
- Other name: Vincenzo Riotta
- Occupation: Actor
- Years active: 1984–present
- Spouse: Teresa Razzauti
- Children: 1

Vincenzo Ricotta (born 14 October 1959), professionally known as Vincent Riotta, is a British actor.

== Career ==
Riotta studied at the Royal Academy of Dramatic Art. He went on to perform in various stage plays, such as Shakespeare's Romeo, which was held at the Young Vic, Tennessee Williams' A Streetcar Named Desire, held at the Leicester Haymarket. Also, the twin roles of The Corsican Brothers at the Abbey in Dublin, and the lead role of Fridays at Seven at the Court Theatre in West Hollywood.

His more notable television appearances include UK soap Coronation Street, The Bill (1990, series 6 episode 52 Close to Home) for Thames Television, New Tricks (2013, series 10 episode Rock the Boat parts one & two) for the BBC, JAG for NBC, Monk for USA Network, and Alias for ABC. In 2016 Riotta appeared in British mystery series Endeavor.

Riotta's film credits include the independent mafia film Al Capone, for which he won the Best Actor award at the 1995 Barcelona Film Festival for his portrayal of the title character. In 2002, he played the lead role of Rico Morales in the drama Bella Bettien. He also holds many cameo appearances to his name in such high-profile films as Captain Corelli's Mandolin, starring Nicolas Cage and Penélope Cruz. However, universally he is probably best recognised as one of the lead male roles in the 2003 romantic-comedy Under The Tuscan Sun, starring Diane Lane and fellow Italian actor Raoul Bova. In the film, he plays Frances Mayes' (Diane Lane) first love interest upon arriving in Italy; a kind, well-reserved and married estate agent from whom she receives emotional support throughout the film. To the contrary, on the commentary of Under the Tuscan Sun, director Audrey Wells states that his character's persona was merely something he invented, as in reality he is boyishly energetic.

== Personal life ==
Riotta was born in Britain to Italian immigrants. He is fluent in Sicilian. He is separated from casting director Teresa Razzauti. He lives in London with his daughter, Emma Riotta.

== Selected filmography ==
- 1985 A.D. Anno Domini - The Trials and Triumphs of the Early Church (TV Mini-Series) as Saint Stephen
- 1985 Car Trouble as Kevin (as Vincenzo Ricotta)
- 1987 Body Contact as Tony Zulu (as Vincenzo Ricotta)
- 1988 Hanna's War as Yoel (as Vincenzo Ricotta)
- 1991 Chernobyl: The Final Warning as Valery Mashenko
- 1993 Leon the Pig Farmer as Elliot Cohen (as Vincenzo Ricotta)
- 1994 Il Quinto giorno as Robert (as Vincenzo Ricotta)
- 1994 La Chance as Nicola (as Vincenzo Ricotta)
- 1994 Ready to Kill as Robert (as Vincenzo Ricotta)
- 1995 A Little Worm (Short) as Al Capone
- 1996 In Love and War as Italian Officer (as Vincenzo Ricotta)
- 1998 Matter of Trust as Johnny (as Vincenzo Ricotta)
- 1998 Falling Sky as Mr. Hanes (as Vince Ricotta)
- 1999 Ballad of the Nightingale as Michael Wynn-Booth (as Vincenzo Ricotta)
- 2000 The Hook-Armed Man (Short) as Lou (as Vincenzo Ricotta)
- 2000 Dancing at the Blue Iguana as Customer (as Vincent Ricotta)
- 2001 Captain Corelli's Mandolin as Quartermaster (as Vincenzo Ricotta)
- 2002 The Good War as Italian POW
- 2002 Heaven as Chief Guard
- 2002 Bella Bettien as Rico Morales
- 2003 Under the Tuscan Sun as Martini
- 2003 Belly of the Beast as Fitch McQuad
- 2004 Nema problema as Anselmo Lorenzi
- 2004 Nel mio amore as Jacques
- 2004 Unstoppable as Detective Jay Miller
- 2005 Revolver as Benny
- 2006 The Listening as Vaughan
- 2007 Nuclear Secrets (TV Mini-Series) as Brugioni
- 2007 The Moon and the Stars as Tumiati
- 2007 Il Capo dei Capi (TV Mini-Series) as Tommaso Buscetta
- 2007 Clare and Francis (2007) as Favarone
- 2008 The Dark Knight as Cop At 250 52nd St.
- 2008 Einstein (TV Movie) as The NASA Operator
- 2009 Butterfly zone - Il senso della farfalla as Uomo (aldilà)
- 2009 Nine as Luigi
- 2009-2012 Squadra antimafia – Palermo oggi (TV Series) as Mickey Robson
- 2011 Zen (TV Mini-Series) as Giorgio de Angelis
- 2011 Hustle Series 7 (TV Series) as Carle Bachini
- 2012 Goltzius and the Pelican Company as Ricardo del Monte
- 2013 Rush as Lauda's Mechanic
- 2013 Third Person as Gerry
- 2013-2014 Da Vinci's Demons (TV Series) as Federico da Montefeltro, Duke of Urbino
- 2014 Romeo and Juliet (TV Series) as Capulet
- 2014 Tender Eyes as Henry
- 2016 Inferno as Death Mask Guard
- 2016 In guerra per amore as USA Army Major James Maone
- 2016 Natale a Londra – Dio salvi la regina as Mike "The Hammer"
- 2017 Black Butterfly as Lieutenant Carcano
- 2017 The Chinese Widow as James Doolittle
- 2017 An American Exorcism as Father Ryan Stone
- 2017 55 Steps as James Adams
- 2018 Entebbe as Dan Shomron
- 2019 Dolce Fine Giornata as Lodovici
- 2019 The Two Popes as Driver
- 2019 Entro Mezzanotte as Prison Guard
- 2020 Divorzio a Las Vegas as Judge Pistons
- 2021 Zack Snyder's Justice League as CID Chief Detective
- 2022 Rocketry: The Nambi Effect as Luigi Crocco
- 2023 The Book Club: The Next Chapter as Gianni
