= Gurukulam (film) =

2014 film

- Directed by: Jillian Elizabeth; Neil Dalal
- Produced by: Jillian Elizabeth
- Starring: Swami Dayananda Saraswati
- Cinematography: J.P. Sniadecki; Jillian Elizabeth
- Edited by: Mary Lampson
- Production companies: Advaita Films; Soma Productions
- Distributed by: Matson Films; 1091 Pictures; Amazon Prime Video
- Release date: February 2, 2014
- Running time: 108 minutes
- Countries: United States; Canada
- Languages: English, Tamil, Sanskrit
- Box office: Gross: $25,651

Gurukulam (Sanskrit: गुरुकुलम्) is a 2014 documentary, directed and produced independently by Jillian Elizabeth and Neil Dalal.

== Development ==
Principal photography took place in the Arsha Vidya Gurukulam of Tamil Nadu.

Anantanand Rambachan served as an advisor for the film.

The film came with support from the Hartley Film Foundation and the Alberta Foundation for the Arts.

== Release ==
Gurukulam premiered at the 2014 Santa Barbara International Film Festival to a limited audience.

In 2015, the movie premiered at small theaters in the United States and Canada. In June 2016, more screenings were shown in the United States. It is now available on multiple streaming platforms.

== Reception ==
Andrew Gow of the University of Alberta praised Gurukulum for providing the "erudite intellectual context" for the practice of yoga. Gow emphasized the film's teaching of Indian philosophy, from Vedanta to broader aspects of Indian culture. Sanjiv Chopra of the Harvard Medical School lauded the applicability of the film to modern humans both in the West and in remote Himalayan villages.

Others were critical of the fly on the wall style of filming and found the pacing difficult to engage with. Other reviewers lamented the absence of an explanation of the philosophy and its traditions, while praising the beauty of the setting.
