= Arsha Vidya Gurukulam =

Vedic teaching institutions

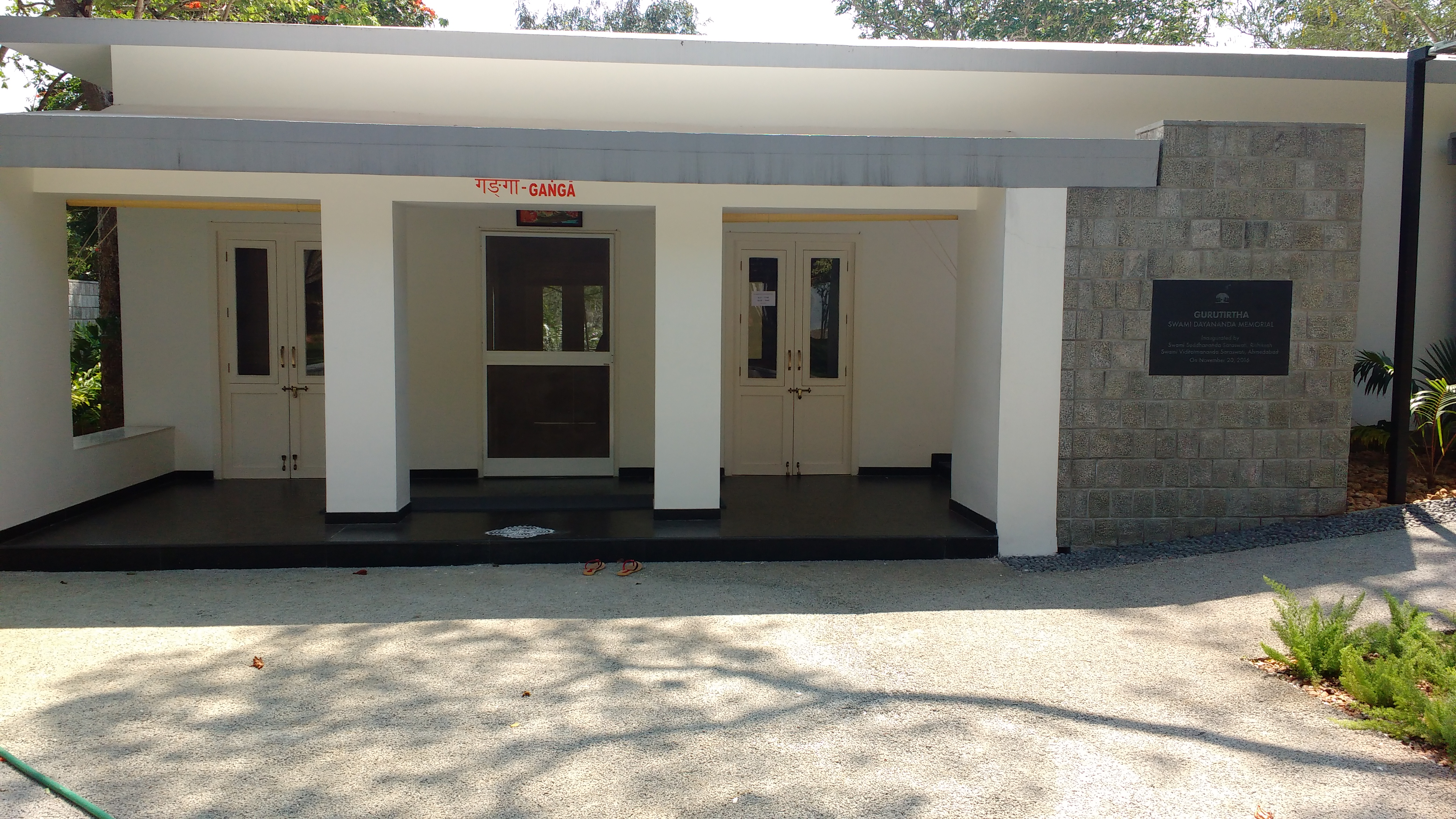
Arsha Vidya Gurukulam in Coimbatore, India

Arsha Vidya Gurukulam is a set of Vedic teaching institutions founded by Swami Dayananda Saraswati (1930 – 2015). A gurukulam is a center for residential learning that evolved from the Vedic tradition. Arsha Vidya translates to knowledge of rishis (sages).

Its current president is Swami Viditatmananda Saraswati (born 1940). Its three main centers in India are the Swami Dayananda Ashram in Rishikesh, the Adhyatma Vidya Mandir in Ahmedabad, and the Arsha Vidya Gurukulam in Coimbatore. In the United States, its main center is the Arsha Vidya Pitham in Saylorsburg, Pennsylvania, about ninety miles west of New York City. As of 2008, it had approximately sixty other centers worldwide.

== Study ==
Since its establishment in 1986, the Arsha Vidya Gurukulam has provided an academic-like environment to focus on study of Advaita Vedanta, Sanskrit, the Vedas and ancient Sanskrit texts. Over time, the institutes have broadened the scope of their libraries and curriculum to include a number of traditional Indian disciplines such as hatha yoga, meditation, ayurveda, and astrology.

== Institutions ==
Arsha Vidya Gurukulam has two main teaching centers: The Saylorsburg campus was established in 1986, and the Coimbatore center was founded in 1990 Another gurukulam is in Nagpur, India.

The word Arsha has also been used by many of Swami Dayananda's students in naming their facilities to mark their lineage. A 2012 estimate found there were at least sixty centers in India and abroad that carry on the tradition of Vedantic teaching under the banner of Arsha Vidya.

In 2017, the lineage of teachers convened at their annual Rishikesh meetup and discussed the need to create a hub to organise the sampradaya (i.e., tradition). To that end, they have created the Arsha Vidya Sampradaya, which provides access to information maintains a directory of Arsha Vidya teachers.

== Ashram ==
Arsha Vidya Pitham, also known as the Swami Dayananda Ashram, is situated in Rishikesh across multiple acres of land. The ashram facilities include a bookstore, modern facilities for dining, as well as a 250 person lecture hall. It also maintains a library with over 5,000 titles on grammar and philosophy and the personal collections of Swami Dayananda Saraswati himself.

The ashram exists on the grounds that have been around since as early as 1967. It was in 1982 that the ashram was expanded and officially named the Arsha Vidya Pitham.

It also runs a publication house, Sri Gangadhareswar Trust that produces books on Vedanta, Hinduism, Hindu philosophy and literature, Paninian grammar, Indian history and related subjects.

It houses the temple of Gangadhareswar, a shrine situated close to the Ganges dedicated to Lord Shiva.

After the Swami's mahāsamādhi (i.e., death) in 2015, a shrine was built at the ashram, containing Dayanandesvara, a consecrated lingam for devotees, as well as the form of the Swami rendered into a statue.

Several students and sanyassis (renunciates) who have studied at the centres, have gone on to spread Dayananda's teachings elsewhere and some have established ashrams of their own.

== Reception ==
In 2016, the Los Angeles Times published a critical review of Gurukulam: One Without a Second, a documentary featuring residents and teachers of the Arsha Vidya Gurukulam in Tamil Nadu, India.

== See also ==
- Gurukulam (film)
