= PopMart Tour =

1997–98 concert tour by U2

- World tour by U2
- Location: North America; Europe; South America; Oceania; Asia; Africa
- Associated album: Pop
- Start date: 25 April 1997
- End date: 21 March 1998
- Legs: 5
- No. of shows: 93
- Attendance: 3,982,657
- Box office: US$173,610,864

U2 concert chronology
- Zoo TV Tour (1992–1993); PopMart Tour (1997–1998); Elevation Tour (2001)

The PopMart Tour was a worldwide concert tour by the Irish rock band U2. Staged in support of the group's 1997 album Pop, the tour's concerts were performed in stadiums and parks in 1997 and 1998. Much like the band's previous Zoo TV Tour, PopMart was an elaborate production. Its lavish stage design had a 165-foot-wide (50 m) LED screen, a 100-foot-high (30 m) golden arch, and a large mirror-ball lemon. As with the Zoo TV Tour, the band delivered an image and performance that were ironic and self-mocking on PopMart, deviating from their earnest performances of the 1980s; the band performed in costumes that, along with the stage design, poked fun at the themes of consumerism and pop culture.

The PopMart Tour spanned five legs and 93 shows, and took U2 to South America, South Africa and Israel for the first time. The tour was booked while the band were still completing Pop, which was planned to be released during the 1996 holiday season. However, the recording sessions went long, delaying the release until March 1997 and cutting into rehearsal time for the tour. Although it was the second-highest-grossing tour of 1997, PopMart was marred by technical difficulties and mixed reviews from critics and fans, particularly in the United States. PopMart grossed US$173.6 million from 3.98 million tickets sold. The tour was depicted on the concert film PopMart: Live from Mexico City.

== Conception and planning ==
U2 stage designer Willie Williams and stage architect Mark Fisher began developing the PopMart Tour in late 1995. U2 re-entered their Dublin recording studio in October 1995, shortly before releasing an experimental/ambient album with Brian Eno, entitled Original Soundtracks 1, under the pseudonym "Passengers". The band started to work on their ninth studio album, which was set to be finished by mid-1996 and released later that year prior to the Christmas and holiday season. Around the same time, in late 1995, Williams began developing concepts for the band's next tour. Among the proposed themes for the tour was a concept based on the end of the millennium titled "U2000", and a discothèque concept involving a large mobile disco. Lead vocalist Bono became interested in one of Williams' designs that resembled a supermarket, which was inspired by facades of American post-war suburban outlet stores. Bono who believed that the symbol of a supermarket, with its large number of choices and temptations, could be used as a metaphor for U2's songs, which often deal with the struggle between desire and faith. With the help of Fisher, Williams designed a fantasy "entertainment outlet", and decided to create a tour with a consumerism theme.

While still in the recording studio, U2 began scheduling tour dates in early 1996, along with band manager Paul McGuinness. U2's stadium performances from the Zoo TV Tour received much positive reception, therefore McGuinness decided that the entire tour should take place in large stadiums, as opposed to beginning the tour in smaller arenas, despite the fact that the band did not feel another stadium tour was necessary. After risking bankruptcy by self-financing the Zoo TV Tour, U2 decided to seek outside sources to finance the cost of taking the PopMart Tour around the world. Initially, the band announced they were looking for sponsors to support the tour, but they later decided to instead use a single promoter for financial assistance. Bids were made with five separate parties, and eventually a deal was made with Toronto-based concert promoter Michael Cohl for $100 million. Cohl expected a total five to six million attendees at over 100 concerts, beginning in April 1997. He also expected the tour to gross $260 million, almost $20 million more than the Rolling Stones' Voodoo Lounge Tour, which was the highest-grossing tour in history at the time, and also organized by Cohl.

As the recording sessions on the new album progressed, U2 decided they would not be ready to finish their album for the mid-year production deadline, and pushed back the release date by several months. To get the album ready for its March 1997 release, the album's recording sessions had to be finished by the end of December. Within one month of the production deadline, the album was still untitled and had much work left before it could be completed. Because the dates for the tour had already been booked, the album's release could not be delayed any further. Eventually, the album was titled Pop, and Williams dubbed the title "PopMart" for the tour. The album's recording sessions were finished in time for the March 1997 release date, but the band felt they still needed another month to fully complete the album. Bono later stated that letting McGuinness book the tour before the album was finished was the worst decision that U2 ever made because it forced them to finish up the album sooner than they had wanted.

== Set design ==
PopMart Tour set
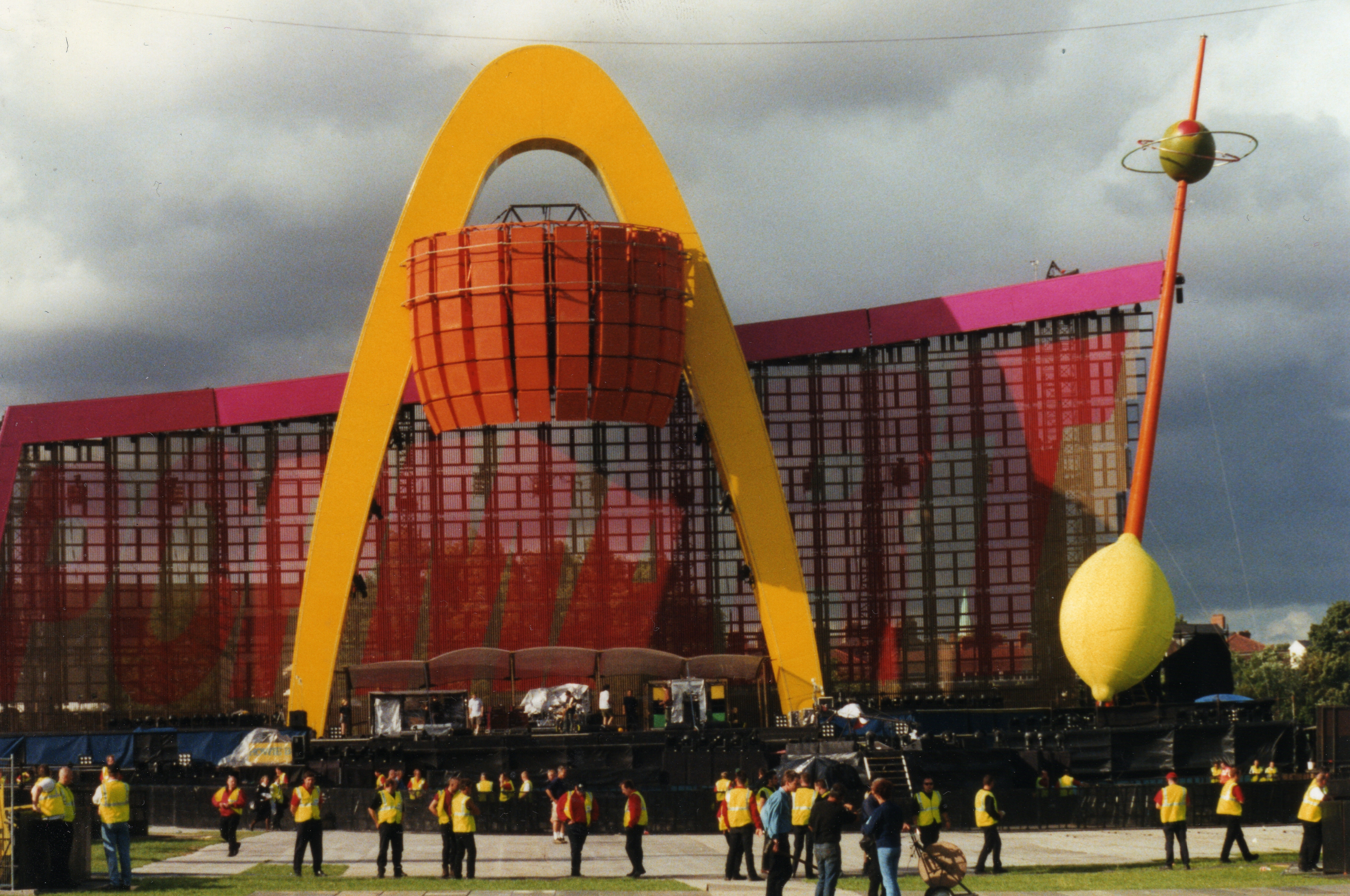

General information
- Type: Concert set
- Architectural style: Pop architecture
- Construction started: 28 March 1997
- Completed: 25 April 1997
- Client: U2

Height
- Height: 30 metres (98 ft)

Design and construction
- Architect: Mark Fisher
- Architecture firm: Mark Fisher Studio
- Structural engineer: Atelier One, MC McLaren PC
- Other designers: Willie Williams

After producing the band's previous tour, Zoo TV, which featured a complex setup involving 36 different video screens, Williams did not want to produce another video-based show unless it was going to be completely different from its predecessor. His initial proposals to U2 featured physical designs, including a center stage surrounded by a racetrack with circling trucks and motorbikes. Fisher researched one of the first LED screens to be imported into the United States. (It was built for the State Fair of Texas in 1995). Fisher proposed to make a much larger LED screen by spacing the pixels further apart, thus creating a lower resolution image. A prototype was built with LED pixels placed 75 mm (3 in) apart on a cargo net. It worked successfully and served as a basis for the proposal of the design. The idea for producing another video-based tour gained much interest when Fisher and Williams were determined to create the largest video screen in existence at that time. When the idea for the screen was proposed to U2, they decided to take the risk of creating a show based on an undeveloped technological experiment, and invested US$7 million to develop the screen.

Fisher proposed the idea of creating an LED screen on a flexible fabric sheet that could be draped over the stadium seats behind the stage. It was later decided that it would be easier to build the screen if it was hung in its own frame, so a sloped frame was added to the screen. Several months were spent experimenting with and demonstrating the capabilities of LED video. The screen designed for the show was ten times larger than all 36 Zoo TV screens put together, with a total size that ranged between 150 and 170 feet (46–52 metres) wide and 50–56 feet (15–17 metres) tall, approximately the same size as the backdrop used during the band's Lovetown Tour in 1989. The screen was created with the help of three separate companies, each of whom manufactured different components. The screen contained 150,000 pixels, each of which contained eight separate LEDs of various colors. The pixels were manufactured by SACO Technologies, a Montreal-based company, which specialized in manufacturing control systems and panels for nuclear and hydrogen power stations. U2 were SACO's first client, and prior to the PopMart Tour, the company had no experience with video technology. Each of the pixels were mounted onto 4,500 separate aluminium tubes, which were then broken down into 187 foldable panels, spread across 22 columns, which would easily fit into two trucks.

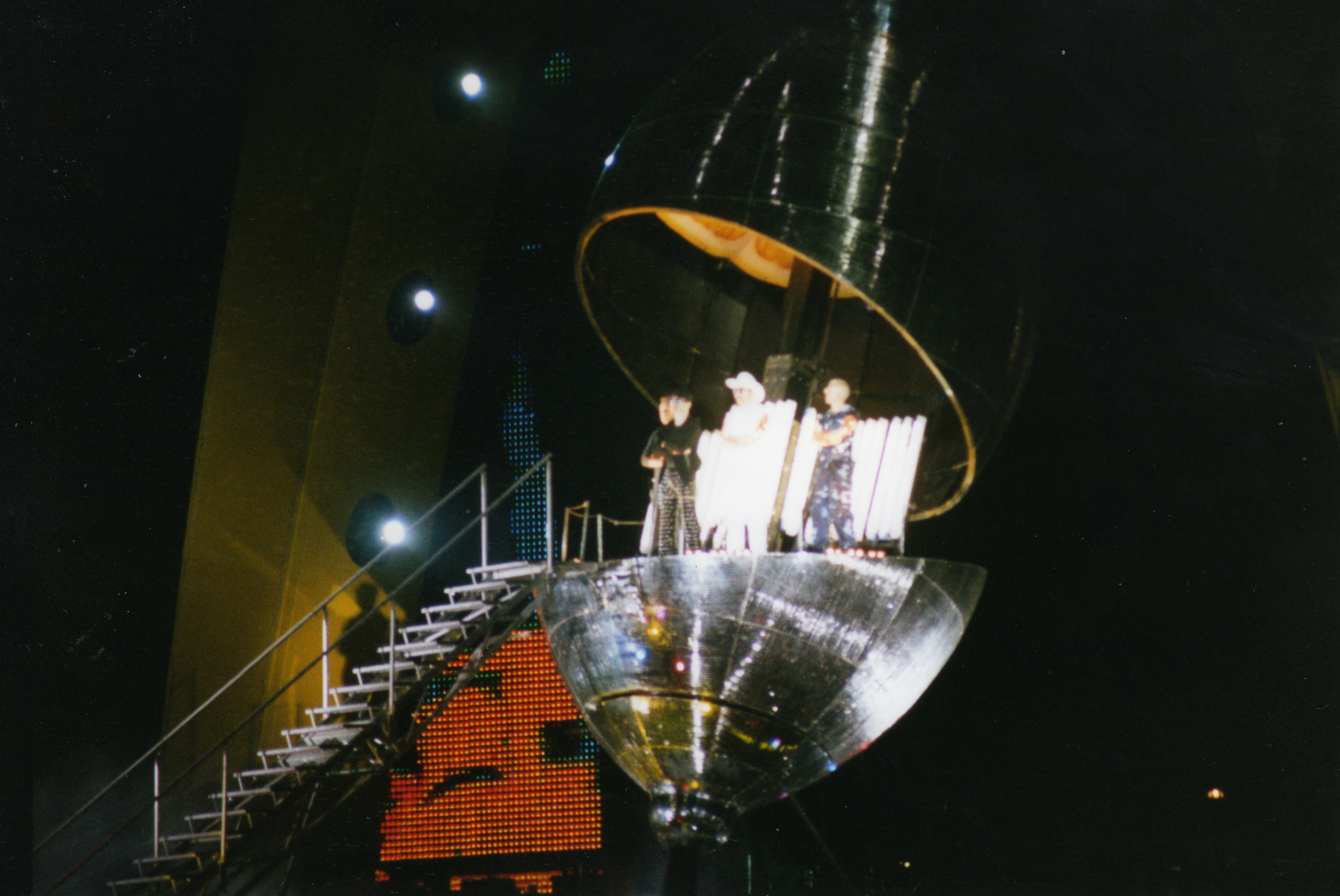
The mirrorball lemon that U2 emerged from for encores. The prop occasionally malfunctioned, trapping the band inside.

The set's public address (PA) system was initially designed by Fisher who proposed a monophonic system with speakers mounted on top of two large antler-like structures in front of the video screen. While discussing the structure to support the centralized PA system, Williams recalled a statement Bono made on the Zoo TV Tour about having a "secret fantasy to play a show underneath a set of gigantic golden arches". So the design was changed to feature a 100-foot (30-m) parabolic arch supporting the PA in the center of the stage. To further develop the concept, Fisher drew a version of the concert stage transformed into a supermarket, which later appeared in the Pop album artwork.

While the set's overall design consisted of simply an arch in front of a sloped video screen, Williams wanted to incorporate a mirrorball into the set, which had previously been featured on both The Joshua Tree and Zoo TV Tours. Bono proposed that the mirrorball should be used as a vehicle in which the band would travel over the audience and onto the B-stage during the show, while making reference to the Parliament-Funkadelic spaceship. Williams took Bono's idea seriously, and suggested that the mirrorball should be lemon-shaped, a reference to U2's song "Lemon" from their album Zooropa. Fisher designed a 40-foot (12 m) motorized lemon mirrorball, which was placed on the right side of the stage. The final additions to the set included a 12-foot-wide (3.8-m) olive mounted onto a 100-foot (30-m) cocktail stick.

== Promotion ==
Going along with the tour's satirical theme of consumerism, U2 announced their tour on 12 February 1997 by holding a news conference at a Kmart discount store at Astor Place, Manhattan, New York City. Hundreds of reporters from record companies, radio stations, television networks, newspapers, and magazines were in attendance at the conference, whose location was not revealed until the night before. Upon their arrival at the store, U2 got up on the stage assembled in the store's lingerie department and performed "Holy Joe," a B-side from the "Discothèque" single, which had been released nine days prior. The entire event was broadcast live through various sources on television, radio, and the Internet. Following the performance, the band answered questions for a half-hour. On why retail was the primary theme of the tour, Bono said, "I can’t quite recall how it got to the idea of taking a supermarket on the road...I remember it making a lot of sense at the time. As I’m sitting here, I’m trying to think what that [reason] is." It was announced that the beginning of the PopMart Tour was to feature stadium shows in 66 cities throughout North America and Europe, beginning in Whitney, Nevada, on 25 April, and ending in Seattle, Washington, on 12 December. They would tour an additional 12 cities in 1998 throughout Africa, Asia, Australia, and South America. Tickets went on sale for the announced dates several days after the tour's announcement, and were priced at an average of $50 worldwide. Due to the lack of sponsors for the tour, ticket prices were almost 50% higher for this tour than Zoo TV. In markets where the average income was low, tickets were sold for a lower price, which was enough for the band to break even and not lose any money in the process.

Before the tour, various markets distributed singles to promote ticket sales. A double 12-inch single of U2 remixes was distributed in Canada, and a CD single of various songs taken from U2's studio albums was released by a radio station in Mexico. In Europe, U2's remix of "Pop Muzik" used to open the PopMart shows, was released as a single on both 12-inch and CD formats. While the first single from Pop, "Discothèque", was released in January 1997, "Staring at the Sun" became the second single from the album, and was released in April 1997 to coincide with the beginning of the tour.

On 26 April 1997, American television network ABC aired a one-hour prime time special about Pop and the PopMart Tour, titled U2: A Year in Pop. Narrated by actor Dennis Hopper, the documentary featured footage from the Pop recording sessions, as well as live footage from the opening PopMart show in Whitney, which took place the night before. The program received poor reception, ranking at 101 out of 107 programs aired that week, according to Nielsen ratings, and became the lowest rated non-political documentary in the history of the ABC network. Despite the low ratings, McGuinness appreciated the opportunity for the band to appear on network television in the first place, stating that the small audience for the television special was still a large audience for the band, as it was much larger than any audience that could be obtained by MTV.

During the middle of the tour's first leg, MSN launched U2's first official website, U2popmart.MSN.com. The website was updated constantly throughout the tour, featuring images and audio clips from various concerts, as well as live webcasts during select performances.

== Concert overview ==
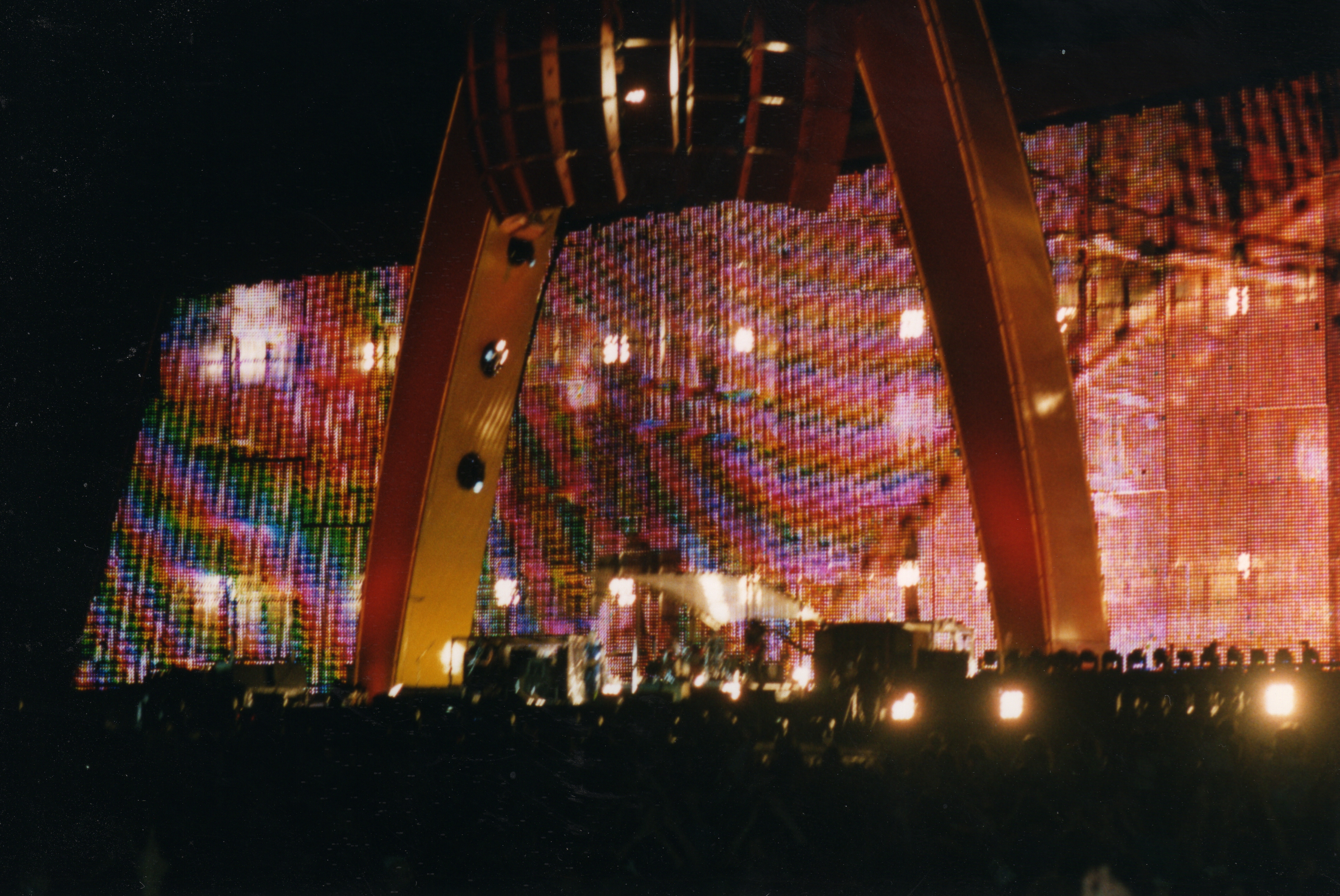
The stage during the performance at Botanic Gardens, Belfast, on August 26, 1997.

Out of the 93 concerts performed during the PopMart Tour, each show had a similar setlist, with 21–24 songs performed by the band at each show. The concerts began with U2's remix of M's "Pop Muzik" played through the PA system. During the song, the band members would walk through the crowd with bodyguards, similar to the beginning of a boxing match. The band would then walk onto the end of the B-stage, heading towards the main stage, where they would begin the show.

=== Main set ===
Each concert opened with a performance of "Mofo." Following "Mofo" at every show, the band performed "I Will Follow", "Even Better Than the Real Thing", "Gone", "Last Night on Earth", and "Until the End of the World". As the group performed, the audience was bombarded with images and colors, all designed towards the show's ironic embrace of tackiness and pop-ular culture.

Each show featured "Staring at the Sun" during the middle of the set, and many shows featured "New Year's Day" and "All I Want Is You". "I Still Haven't Found What I'm Looking For", "Pride (In the Name of Love)", and "Bullet the Blue Sky" (often preceded by "Miami") were also played at every show. Those songs were often followed by an "Edge Karaoke" slot, in which the Edge would sing the Monkees' "Daydream Believer" or a similar song against a cheap karaoke CD, complete with lyrics shown on the giant screen. The end of each main set featured "Please", which segued into "Where the Streets Have No Name".

=== Encores ===
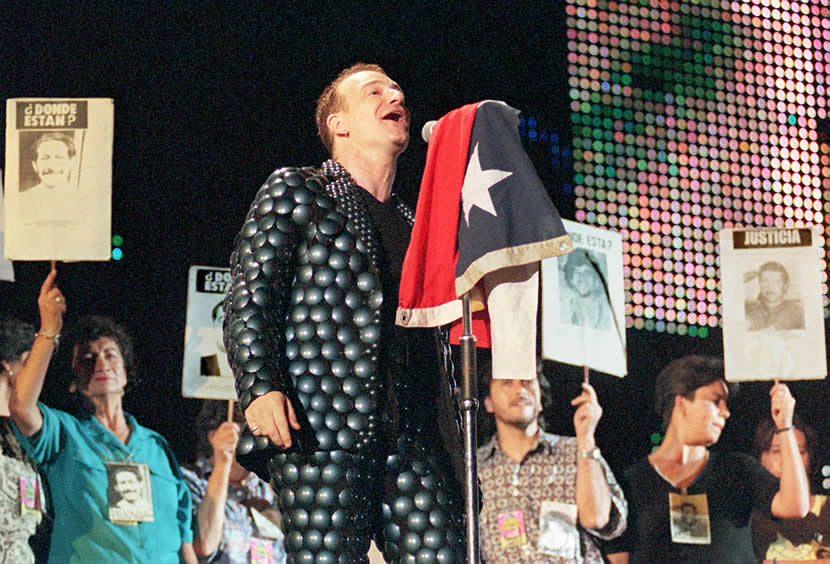
Mothers of disappeared detainees join U2 on stage during a performance at Estadio Nacional, Santiago, Chile, on February 11, 1998.

At the end of the main set, before the first encore, the giant lemon moved to the middle of the stage. There a sheet fell off exposing a huge disco ball that lit up the stadium in spinning lights while the Perfecto Mix of "Lemon" played over the PA. The band then would walk out of the giant lemon onto the B stage to perform "Discothèque".

The rest of the first encore typically consisted of "If You Wear That Velvet Dress" and "With or Without You". After another brief break, the band would return to perform "Hold Me, Thrill Me, Kiss Me, Kill Me", their single from 1995 for the Batman Forever soundtrack, followed by "Mysterious Ways". "One" always followed, ending a handful of shows, but otherwise it was followed by one more song. "Unchained Melody", "Wake Up Dead Man", and "MLK" were variously performed to close the show. On a handful of occasions, the show ended with another song, such as "Rain", "Hallelujah", "Mothers of the Disappeared" (during which the Mothers of the Plaza de Mayo were brought on stage in Buenos Aires), "40", or "Can't Help Falling in Love". "She's a Mystery to Me" and "Staring at the Sun" each ended a single show, as well.

=== Additional songs ===
A total of 55 different songs were played throughout the tour; 17 of the 55 songs were played at all PopMart shows. Out of the 12 songs on Pop, each song was played in full at least once, with the exception of "The Playboy Mansion", which was only featured as a snippet several times at the end of "Where the Streets Have No Name". "Do You Feel Loved" was only performed during the first six shows, and "If God Will Send His Angels" was performed once by the full band, plus about 20 other times solely by Bono and the Edge. "Bad" and "Desire" were also played at a handful of shows.

== Sarajevo concert ==
During the Zoo TV Tour, U2 aired controversial satellite link-ups to Sarajevo. The link-ups were arranged by aid worker Bill Carter, who interviewed ordinary people about their experiences of the ongoing War in Bosnia and Herzegovina. As a result of the satellite broadcasts, U2 promised to play in Sarajevo. The Sarajevo show had to wait until the PopMart Tour, when U2 became the first major band to perform in the city after the war had ended. The highly emotional concert was among the highlights of the PopMart Tour. 45,000 people attended and effort was made to make sure all the ethnic groups were present. Also in attendance were several hundred members of the international "Stabilisation Force" (SFOR) who were tasked at that time with upholding the Dayton Agreement. During the encore, Brian Eno got on stage for the band's first ever live performance of "Miss Sarajevo." Luciano Pavarotti, who was guest vocalist on the original recording was not in Sarajevo. However, his vocal was retained. An old style phonograph, complete with amplifying horn, was brought on stage for the song and its stylus was moved into position by Brian Eno to coincide with the tenor's vocal contribution. Unfortunately, the performance of this song did not go as well as planned as the band's timing was off and Bono was having difficulty with his voice. It was in this context that Bono chose to apologize to the audience for the band not being able to "fucking play it." After the Sarajevo show in 1997, "Miss Sarajevo" was not played again until the second leg of the Vertigo Tour in 2005.

This concert was also the first time the band had performed "Sunday Bloody Sunday" in more than four years. It was performed solo by the Edge who frequently introduced the song during the final legs of the tour by stating that the band had "rediscovered" it in Sarajevo. Larry Mullen Jr. also played the leading drumbeat from the song as part of the second half of "Please".

Despite the subpar performance, a news story said, "For two magical hours, the rock band U2 achieved what warriors, politicians and diplomats could not: They united Bosnia." Trains ran for the first time since the war to enable people to see the concert, though they were stopped again afterward. Bono later called the Sarajevo show "one of the toughest and one of the sweetest nights of my life." Mullen called it "an experience I will never forget for the rest of my life, and if I had to spend 20 years in the band just to play that show, and have done that, I think it would have been worthwhile."

== Reception ==
Although the extravagance of the tour was visually and technically impressive, the early dates of PopMart were, on occasion, marred by subpar performances. The band’s management had booked the tour before the album was finished, and with the planned November 1996 release pushed back until March 1997 to finish the album, valuable tour rehearsal time was lost. This lack of preparation manifested itself in the shows, particularly during the poorly received opening night in Las Vegas. There was intense pressure for the band, especially with several journalists and celebrities in attendance. The band lost their timing on the song "Staring at the Sun", stopped playing partway through, and then started over. During "Discotheque", the crew filled the stage with too much dry-ice; the Edge could not see his guitar pedal in the midst of the smoke and had to kneel down to find it by touch.

Nonetheless, the quality of the performances improved greatly as certain new songs were dropped or reworked, old crowd favourites re-introduced and the setlist evolved into a more coherent order during the first two months. At the Giants Stadium dates, "Staring at the Sun" was performed acoustically by Bono and the Edge. Becoming one of the show's highlights, it would be performed this way for the rest of the tour.

By the second leg in Europe, the performances had vastly improved as evidenced by the Popheart EP that featured three songs from the first European show in Rotterdam.

The band had some difficulty filling stadiums in the southern and Midwestern US, yet there were multiple night sellouts in Chicago, New York and Boston. It was however better received by Europeans and in particular, South American audiences. It was the first time U2 had toured South America and Bono remarked that the rapturous fan response they received there helped U2 regain their confidence and appreciation for playing together.

PopMart from seats at the far end of a venue.

Despite its cleverness and positive critical response, many fans felt alienated by the shows; certain material from the Pop album did not go down as well as U2 might have hoped and many people did not seem to have understood its satirical nature. U2 had dressed as the Village People in the "Discothèque" video, and this willingness to mock their serious image continued during PopMart. (At the Los Angeles Coliseum show on 21 June, tribute was paid to the original "Prefab Four" with a guest appearance by Davy Jones of The Monkees to perform his signature song, "Daydream Believer".) But U2's irony-drenched "big shtick" failed to satisfy many critics and fans seemingly confused by the band's new image and elaborate sets. One NME critic later recalled a "ludicrous hullabaloo" that was a departure from "Planet Reality."

Disrupting a few shows, technical problems also arose throughout the tour. As the band were about to walk out of the giant mechanical lemon for the encore of a show in Oslo, the lemon malfunctioned, trapping the band inside and forcing them to escape through a small hatch at the back. This incident was later listed as one of "Rock 'n' Roll's 15 Most Embarrassing Stage Antics" by AOL's Spinner.com. The lemon malfunctioned again at a show in Sydney, and was not used at all, and also malfunctioned in Osaka, Japan, where the band were again trapped inside but unable to escape through the back. In addition to the issues with the mechanical lemon, the large LED video screen became damaged in Washington, D.C. by a rain storm during a concert. The video screen required time for repairs which ended up causing an entire concert in Raleigh, North Carolina to be cancelled.

Like the band's previous Zoo TV Tour, PopMart was another huge success in terms of revenue, grossing US$173,610,864 from 3,982,657 tickets sold. On 20 September 1997, the band performed in front of over 150,000 people in Reggio Emilia, Italy, and set a new world record for having the most attendees at a concert for a single performer.

More than a decade after PopMart, despite the criticism and mishaps, Bono said that he considered the tour to be their best. "Pop(Mart) is our finest hour. It's better than Zoo TV aesthetically, and as an art project it is a clearer thought." He later added "When that show worked, it was mindblowing." The Edge said that he was "very proud of [Pop] by the end of the tour. We finally figured it out by the time we made the DVD. It was an amazing show that I'm really proud of."

== Post-tour ==
=== Appearance on The Simpsons ===
U2's PopMart show on The Simpsons

In April 1998, one month after the PopMart Tour had ended, U2 appeared as guest stars on the 200th episode of The Simpsons, "Trash of the Titans." The episode featured U2 performing a PopMart concert in Springfield Stadium where Homer Simpson disrupted the show during a performance of "Pride (In the Name of Love)." The four members of the band and entire PopMart stage were shown in animated form. Bono, the Edge, and Adam Clayton had voice appearances in the episodes, as well as the band's manager, Paul McGuinness, and McGuinness' assistant, Susie Smith. Mullen was not present for the studio recordings and therefore appeared in a non-speaking role. The band even had a small part in a musical number. U2's guest appearance was later featured on The Phoenix's list of "The Simpsons 20 Best Guest Voices of All Time."

=== Live releases ===
In December 1997, the two PopMart Tour concerts in Mexico City were filmed for various future video and audio releases. In November 1998, PolyGram and Island Records released the video PopMart: Live from Mexico City on VHS and Video CD. The video combined footage from the two concerts, and featured all 25 songs performed at both shows. The VHS and Video CD releases have since been out of print; however, a DVD version was released for the first time in September 2007. In 2000, the album Hasta la Vista Baby! was released exclusively to members of U2's fan club, which featured 14 of the 25 songs from Mexico City on one CD. Released around the same time were the various "Beautiful Day" singles, which featured the live versions of "Discothèque", "If You Wear That Velvet Dress", and "Last Night on Earth," the latter of which was also featured on the "Elevation" single. The live video of "Last Night on Earth" appeared on the Australian "Beautiful Day" single, and the live video of "Gone" appeared on The Best of 1990–2000 video releases.

In addition to the recordings from Mexico City, live versions of "Please", "Where the Streets Have No Name", and "Staring at the Sun" from Rotterdam, as well as "With or Without You" from Edmonton, were released internationally on the Please: PopHeart Live EP, and later on the "Please" single in the United States. A live video of "Please" filmed in Helsinki, known as the "Live Mural Cut", was featured on the bonus DVD of the special edition release of the album, The Best of 1990–2000.

== Tour dates ==
List of concerts, showing date, city, country, venue, opening act, tickets sold, number of available tickets and gross revenue
Date	City	Country	Venue	Opening Act(s)	Attendance	Revenue
Leg 1: North America
25 April 1997	Whitney	United States	Sam Boyd Stadium	Rage Against the Machine	36,742 / 36,742	$1,866,524
28 April 1997	San Diego	United States	Jack Murphy Stadium	Rage Against the Machine	30,572 / 55,000	$1,545,990
1 May 1997	Denver	United States	Mile High Stadium	Rage Against the Machine	28,540 / 50,000	$1,432,565
3 May 1997	Salt Lake City	United States	Robert Rice Stadium	Rage Against the Machine	33,277 / 33,277	$1,692,732
6 May 1997	Eugene	United States	Autzen Stadium	Rage Against the Machine	25,931 / 35,000	$1,293,540
9 May 1997	Tempe	United States	Sun Devil Stadium	Rage Against the Machine	33,539 / 45,000	$1,673,317
12 May 1997	Dallas	United States	Cotton Bowl	Rage Against the Machine	38,043 / 45,000	$1,908,637
14 May 1997	Memphis	United States	Liberty Bowl Memorial Stadium	Rage Against the Machine	22,734 / 35,000	$1,131,570
16 May 1997	Clemson	United States	Frank Howard Memorial Stadium	Rage Against the Machine	20,251 / 36,500	$1,043,349
19 May 1997	Kansas City	United States	Arrowhead Stadium	Fun Lovin' Criminals	23,709 / 55,000	$1,201,035
22 May 1997	Pittsburgh	United States	Three Rivers Stadium	Fun Lovin' Criminals	27,785 / 45,000	$1,376,317
24 May 1997	Columbus	United States	Ohio Stadium	Fun Lovin' Criminals	43,813 / 50,000	$2,246,977
26 May 1997	Washington, D.C.	United States	Robert F. Kennedy Memorial Stadium	Fun Lovin' Criminals	42,295 / 44,000	$2,149,432
31 May 1997	East Rutherford	United States	Giants Stadium	Fun Lovin' Criminals; Longpigs	129,644 / 140,000	$6,499,131
1 June 1997	East Rutherford	United States	Giants Stadium	Fun Lovin' Criminals; Longpigs	129,644 / 140,000	$6,499,131
3 June 1997	East Rutherford	United States	Giants Stadium	Fun Lovin' Criminals; Longpigs	129,644 / 140,000	$6,499,131
8 June 1997	Philadelphia	United States	Franklin Field	Fun Lovin' Criminals	49,944 / 49,944	$2,549,610
12 June 1997	Winnipeg	Canada	Winnipeg Stadium	Fun Lovin' Criminals	42,270 / 42,270	$1,653,884
14 June 1997	Edmonton	Canada	Commonwealth Stadium	Fun Lovin' Criminals	90,000 / 90,000	$3,493,456
15 June 1997	Edmonton	Canada	Commonwealth Stadium	Fun Lovin' Criminals	90,000 / 90,000	$3,493,456
18 June 1997	Oakland	United States	Oakland–Alameda County Coliseum	Oasis	66,990 / 85,000	$3,263,243
19 June 1997	Oakland	United States	Oakland–Alameda County Coliseum	Oasis	66,990 / 85,000	$3,263,243
21 June 1997	Los Angeles	United States	Los Angeles Memorial Coliseum	Rage Against the Machine	65,488 / 65,488	$3,329,775
25 June 1997	Madison	United States	Camp Randall Stadium	Fun Lovin' Criminals	34,002 / 40,000	$1,701,045
27 June 1997	Chicago	United States	Soldier Field	Fun Lovin' Criminals	116,912 / 127,500	$5,956,587
28 June 1997	Chicago	United States	Soldier Field	Fun Lovin' Criminals	116,912 / 127,500	$5,956,587
29 June 1997	Chicago	United States	Soldier Field	Fun Lovin' Criminals	116,912 / 127,500	$5,956,587
1 July 1997	Foxborough	United States	Foxboro Stadium	Fun Lovin' Criminals	93,946 / 93,946	$4,719,124
2 July 1997	Foxborough	United States	Foxboro Stadium	Fun Lovin' Criminals	93,946 / 93,946	$4,719,124
Leg 2: Europe and Asia
18 July 1997	Rotterdam	Netherlands	Feijenoord Stadion	Skunk Anansie	91,832 / 91,832	$3,214,484
19 July 1997	Rotterdam	Netherlands	Feijenoord Stadion	Skunk Anansie	91,832 / 91,832	$3,214,484
25 July 1997	Werchter	Belgium	Werchter festival ground	Skunk Anansie	37,498 / 37,498	$1,482,134
27 July 1997	Cologne	Germany	Butzweiler Hof Airfield	Die Fantastischen Vier	27,662 / 35,000	$1,059,067
29 July 1997	Leipzig	Germany	Festwiese	Die Fantastischen Vier	18,463 / 25,000	$702,396
31 July 1997	Mannheim	Germany	Maimarkt-Gelände	Die Fantastischen Vier	18,828 / 25,000	$716,281
2 August 1997	Gothenburg	Sweden	Ullevi Stadium	Audioweb	46,658 / 46,658	$1,920,178
4 August 1997	Copenhagen	Denmark	Parken Stadion	Audioweb	42,734 / 42,734	$2,079,137
6 August 1997	Oslo	Norway	Valle Hovin	Audioweb	40,000 / 40,000	$1,698,841
9 August 1997	Helsinki	Finland	Olympiastadion	Audioweb	50,943 / 50,943	$2,198,978
12 August 1997	Warsaw	Poland	Warsaw Horse Track	Audioweb	52,070 / 52,070	$1,042,066
14 August 1997	Prague	Czech Republic	Strahov Stadium	Audioweb	61,010 / 61,010	$1,254,201
16 August 1997	Wiener Neustadt	Austria	Wiener Neustadt Airfield	Paradise Now	62,592 / 62,592	$2,017,344
18 August 1997	Nuremberg	Germany	Zeppelinfeld	Die Fantastischen Vier	29,916 / 29,916	$1,153,149
20 August 1997	Hanover	Germany	Messegelände	Die Fantastischen Vier	40,183 / 40,183	$1,520,437
22 August 1997	London	England	Wembley Stadium	Audioweb, Longpigs	144,308 / 144,308	$6,753,356
23 August 1997	London	England	Wembley Stadium	Audioweb, Longpigs	144,308 / 144,308	$6,753,356
26 August 1997	Belfast	Northern Ireland	Botanic Gardens	Ash	39,362 / 39,362	$1,669,372
28 August 1997	Leeds	England	Roundhay Park	Cast	53,917 / 53,917	$2,458,615
30 August 1997	Dublin	Ireland	Lansdowne Road	Ash	85,046 / 85,046	$3,441,268
31 August 1997	Dublin	Ireland	Lansdowne Road	Ash	85,046 / 85,046	$3,441,268
2 September 1997	Edinburgh	Scotland	Murrayfield Stadium	The Seahorses	50,439 / 50,439	$2,318,566
6 September 1997	Paris	France	Parc des Princes	Placebo	53,519 / 53,519	$2,501,742
9 September 1997	Madrid	Spain	Estadio Vicente Calderón	Placebo	46,385 / 46,385	$1,776,728
11 September 1997	Lisbon	Portugal	Estádio José Alvalade	Placebo	62,114 / 62,114	$2,045,906
13 September 1997	Barcelona	Spain	Estadi Olímpic Lluís Companys	Placebo	60,096 / 60,096	$2,281,165
15 September 1997	Montpellier	France	Espace Grammont	Placebo	24,188 / 30,000	$1,033,643
18 September 1997	Rome	Italy	Urbe Airport	Prozac+ Casino Royale	56,392 / 56,392	$1,990,073
20 September 1997	Reggio Emilia	Italy	Campo Volo Airport/Festa dell'Unità	Prozac+ Casino Royale	150,000 / 150,000	$5,294,117
23 September 1997	Sarajevo	Bosnia and Herzegovina	Stadion Koševo	Gazi-Husref Beg choir Protest; Sikter	45,000 / 45,000	$540,000
26 September 1997	Thessaloniki	Greece	Harbour Yard	Echo Tattoo and Niko Portokalogou	50,000 / 50,000	$725,000
30 September 1997	Tel Aviv	Israel	Hayarkon Park	Apollo 440	31,566 / 35,000	$1,809,388
Leg 3: North America
26 October 1997	Toronto	Canada	SkyDome	Third Eye Blind	99,195 / 99,195	$3,875,335
27 October 1997	Toronto	Canada	SkyDome	Third Eye Blind	99,195 / 99,195	$3,875,335
29 October 1997	Minneapolis	United States	Hubert H. Humphrey Metrodome	Smash Mouth	28,724 / 52,000	$1,471,800
31 October 1997	Pontiac	United States	Pontiac Silverdome	Smash Mouth	35,463 / 40,000	$1,781,621
2 November 1997	Montreal	Canada	Olympic Stadium	Third Eye Blind	48,855 / 48,855	$1,905,108
8 November 1997	St. Louis	United States	Trans World Dome	Third Eye Blind	24,807 / 50,000	$1,282,160
10 November 1997	Tampa	United States	Houlihan's Stadium	Third Eye Blind	18,751 / 50,000	$893,865
12 November 1997	Jacksonville	United States	Alltel Stadium	Third Eye Blind	14,491 / 50,000	$1,282,160
14 November 1997	Miami Gardens	United States	Pro Player Stadium	Smash Mouth	42,778 / 44,500	$2,158,988
21 November 1997	New Orleans	United States	Louisiana Superdome	Third Eye Blind	21,465 / 25,000	$911,528
23 November 1997	San Antonio	United States	Alamodome	Third Eye Blind	26,022 / 30,000	$1,277,250
26 November 1997	Atlanta	United States	Georgia Dome	Smash Mouth	26,491 / 32,500	$1,325,288
28 November 1997	Houston	United States	Astrodome	Smash Mouth	22,981 / 30,000	$1,156,155
2 December 1997	Mexico City	Mexico	Foro Sol	Control Machete	106,966 / 106,966	$4,595,225
3 December 1997	Mexico City	Mexico	Foro Sol	Control Machete	106,966 / 106,966	$4,595,225
9 December 1997	Vancouver	Canada	BC Place Stadium	Smash Mouth	29,468 / 35,000	$1,136,592
12 December 1997	Seattle	United States	Kingdome	Smash Mouth	30,260 / 35,000	$1,539,105
Leg 4: South America
27 January 1998	Rio de Janeiro	Brazil	Autódromo Internacional Nelson Piquet	Bootnafat; Gabriel o Pensador	66,949 / 66,949	$2,654,715
30 January 1998	São Paulo	Brazil	Morumbi Stadium	Bootnafat; Gabriel o Pensador	154,056 / 154,056	$6,103,065
31 January 1998	São Paulo	Brazil	Morumbi Stadium	Bootnafat; Gabriel o Pensador	154,056 / 154,056	$6,103,065
5 February 1998	Buenos Aires	Argentina	Estadio Monumental	Babasónicos; Illya Kuryaki and the Valderramas	160,478 / 160,478	$8,668,840
6 February 1998	Buenos Aires	Argentina	Estadio Monumental	Babasónicos; Illya Kuryaki and the Valderramas	160,478 / 160,478	$8,668,840
7 February 1998	Buenos Aires	Argentina	Estadio Monumental	Babasónicos; Illya Kuryaki and the Valderramas	160,478 / 160,478	$8,668,840
11 February 1998	Santiago	Chile	Estadio Nacional	Santa Locura	67,633 / 67,633	$2,171,112
Leg 5: Oceania, Asia, and Africa
17 February 1998	Perth	Australia	Burswood Dome	Sidewinder	13,775 / 13,775	$1,273,178
21 February 1998	Melbourne	Australia	Waverley Park	Sidewinder	23,810 / 30,000	$1,366,510
25 February 1998	Brisbane	Australia	ANZ Stadium	Sidewinder	17,567 / 30,000	$1,019,744
27 February 1998	Sydney	Australia	Football Ground Sydney	Sidewinder	37,976 / 37,976	$2,236,123
5 March 1998	Tokyo	Japan	Tokyo Dome		34,265 / 38,000	$2,439,230
11 March 1998	Osaka	Japan	Osaka Dome		19,735 / 25,000	$1,404,722
16 March 1998	Cape Town	South Africa	Greenpoint Stadium	Just Jinger	30,362 / 30,362	$1,339,233
21 March 1998	Johannesburg	South Africa	Athletic Park	Bayete	64,320 / 64,320	$2,467,843

== See also ==
- List of highest-attended concerts
- List of most-attended concert tours
- List of highest-grossing concert tours
- Timeline of U2
