= Please: PopHeart Live EP =

EP (Live) by U2
- Released: 8 September 1997
- Recorded: 1997
- Genre: Rock
- Length: 23:55
- Label: Island

U2 chronology
Pop (1997)	Please: PopHeart Live EP (1997)	The Best of 1980–1990 (1998)

Please: PopHeart Live EP is a live EP by the Irish rock band U2. The EP features four live tracks from the band's PopMart Tour and was released towards end of the second leg of the tour on 8 and 9 September 1997. Two of four the songs on the release were from the band's most recent album at the time, Pop (1997) and the other two were from The Joshua Tree (1987). This release was U2's first EP since Wide Awake in America (1985).

Despite its title, this release was not the single to U2's song "Please", which was not released until two months later. The EP was released in most regions except in the United States, in which its four tracks were eventually included on the "Please" single, released two months later. The photograph on the cover of the album was taken by the band's set designer, Willie Williams. It features an image of the PopMart stage arch with images of artwork by the late pop artist Keith Haring on the LED video screen.

== Track listing ==
All lyrics are written by Bono and The Edge; all music is composed by U2

No.	Title	Length
1.	"Please" (Live from Rotterdam, 18 July 1997)	7:11
2.	"Where the Streets Have No Name" (Live from Rotterdam, 18 July 1997)	6:33
3.	"With or Without You" (Live from Edmonton, 14 June 1997)	4:38
4.	"Staring at the Sun" (Live from Rotterdam, 18 July 1997)	5:33
Total length:		23:55

== Song notes ==
The live version of "Please" features a drum beat similar to "Sunday Bloody Sunday" during the bridge. The end of "Please" segues directly into a performance of "Where the Streets Have No Name", with a faster guitar lead and an extended outro, as well as a snippet of several lyrics from "The Playboy Mansion", the only song from Pop which was not played live during the tour. "Staring at the Sun" is played acoustically by Bono and The Edge, which was the fashion in which the song was played for most of the PopMart Tour.

== Personnel ==
U2

- Bono – lead vocals, guitar
- The Edge – guitar, vocals
- Adam Clayton – bass guitar
- Larry Mullen Jr. – drums

Technical

- Recording – Andy Rose
- Mixing – Mark "Spike" Stent
- Editing – Andy VanDette
- Mastering – Howie Weinberg

== Charts ==
Chart (1997)	Peak position
Canadian Albums Chart	4
UK Albums Chart	7

=== Year-end charts ===
Chart (2001)	Position
Canada (Nielsen SoundScan)	110

== See also ==
- U2 discography
