= Michael E. Rodgers =

Scottish actor and acting coach (born 1969)

- Born: 8 May 1969 (age 57); Whitburn, West Lothian, Scotland
- Occupations: Actor, acting coach
- Years active: 1989–present
- Website: michaelrodgersstudio.com

Michael Ethan Rodgers (born 8 May 1969) is a Scottish actor and acting coach.

== Early life ==
Michael Ethan Rodgers was born in Whitburn, West Lothian, Scotland on 8 May 1969.

== Career ==
Rodgers moved to Los Angeles, California in 1989 to pursue his acting career.

He began his film career with a role in Gia with Angelina Jolie. Shortly thereafter, he went to work with Nigel Hawthorne and Minnie Driver in the feature film Uncorked and director Allison Anders in Sugar Town. He later played alongside Mel Gibson in The Patriot and with Alec Baldwin and Peter Fonda in Thomas and the Magic Railroad in which he played Mr C. Junior. He is best known for playing the acerbic Richard Dawson in the Bob Crane biopic, Auto Focus, directed by Paul Schrader. He runs Michael Rodgers Studio in Milan, Italy, an acting school.

He has appeared on various television series including NYPD Blue, Bones, CSI: Miami, Veronica Mars, American Dreams, Windfall, Will & Grace and the 2010 series Leverage and Mysterious Ways. He also provided the English voice of Judge Gabranth in Final Fantasy XII.

== Filmography ==
=== Film ===
Year	Title	Role	Notes
1996	The Dentist	Nervous Patient	
1998	At Sachem Farm	Paul	
1999	Sugar Town	Journalist	
2000	Escape Under Pressure	Rupp	
2000	Thomas and the Magic Railroad	Mr. C. Junior	
2001	Thank Heaven	Horace	
2002	Auto Focus	Richard Dawson	
2003	Klepto	Sandy Hauser	
2003	The Bone Hunter	Aedgar	
2004	Red Rose	Robert Burns	
2005	What's Up, Scarlet?	Bruno	
2006	Stranded	Mark	Short
2007	Sinner	Stephen	
2015	The Good Italian	William	Short
2019	Simple Women	Martin Donavan	

=== Television ===
Year	Title	Role	Notes
1997	Night Man	Charles Hilliard	Episode: "Whole Lotta Shakin'..."
1998	Gia	Red Dress Photographer	
1998	NYPD Blue	Eddie 'The Fly' Golota	Episode: "Twin Petes"
2000	Will & Grace	Charlie	Episode: "Advise and Resent"
2000	Metropolis	Nate	TV film
2001	Mysterious Ways	Everett Collins	Episode: "Dead Dog Walking"
2002	American Family	Cingean Flanigan	Episodes: "The Journey: Parts 1 & 2"
2003–04	American Dreams	Colin Blair	Recurring role (seasons 2–3)
2004	Charmed	First Mate Reznor	Episode: "Charrrmed!"
2005	Veronica Mars	Colin Nevin	Episode: "Green-Eyed Monster"
2005	The Triangle	Bruce Geller	TV miniseries
2006	CSI: Miami	Keith Gifford	Episode: "The Score"
2006	Killer Instinct	Mace / Edward Peterson	Episode: "Love Hurts"
2006	Bones	Jesse Kane	Episode: "The Man on the Fairway"
2006	Windfall	Pascal / Patrick	Episodes: "The Myth of More", "Urgent Care"
2008	As the World Turns	Neal Stokes	Guest role (3 episodes)
2010	Leverage	Chapman	Episode: "The Big Bang Job"
2018	Penny on M.A.R.S.	Bruce	Recurring role

=== Video games ===
Year	Title	Role	Notes
2005	The Matrix: Path of Neo	Doberman	
2006	Final Fantasy XII	Judge Magister Gabranth	
