= Snake & Mongoose =

- Theatrical release poster
- Directed by: Wayne Holloway
- Written by: Alan Paradise; Wayne Holloway
- Produced by: Robin Broidy; Stephen Nemeth
- Starring: Jesse Williams; Richard Blake; Ashley Hinshaw; Kim Shaw; Tim Blake Nelson; Fred Dryer; Noah Wyle
- Cinematography: John Bailey
- Edited by: Richard Halsey; Nicholas Wayman-Harris
- Music by: Gary Barlough
- Production companies: Entertainment Universe; Rhino Films
- Distributed by: Rocky Mountain Pictures
- Release date: September 6, 2013 (United States)
- Running time: 102 minutes
- Country: United States
- Language: English
- Box office: $152,200

Snake & Mongoose is a 2013 American sports drama film directed by Wayne Holloway, starring Jesse Williams and Richard Blake as drag racers Don "The Snake" Prudhomme and Tom "The Mongoose" McEwen, respectively.

The film received a limited theatrical release in 20 cities between August 9 and November 4, 2013. Anchor Bay Films acquired the home entertainment rights and the film was released through video on demand and digital download on March 4, 2014, and on DVD and Blu-ray on April 8, 2014.

== Premise ==
The film tells the story of the rivalry between drag racing drivers Don "The Snake" Prudhomme and Tom "The Mongoose" McEwen and their groundbreaking accomplishments in the world of drag racing.

The two help popularize the sport of drag racing when they team up in 1969 with Mattel's new Hot Wheels toy line, which had just hit the market the previous year. The partnership with Mattel helped revolutionize sports marketing.

== Cast ==
- Jesse Williams as Don "The Snake" Prudhomme
- Richard Blake as Tom "The Mongoose" McEwen
- Fred Dryer as Ed Donovan
- Noah Wyle as Arthur Spear
- Tim Blake Nelson as Mike McAllister
- Ashley Hinshaw as Lynn Prudhomme
- Kim Shaw as Judy McEwen
- John Heard as Wally Parks
- Ian Ziering as Keith Black
- Joshua Leonard as Thomas Greer
- Sean Brosnan as Kenny Youngblood
- Leonardo Nam as Roland Leong
