= At Sachem Farm =

1998 film

- Directed by: John Huddles
- Screenplay by: John Huddles
- Produced by: Robert Snukal; Daniel Grodnik
- Starring: Minnie Driver; Rufus Sewell
- Release date: 13 September 1998
- Running time: 106 minutes
- Country: United States
- Language: English

At Sachem Farm (also known as Higher Love, Trade Winds and Uncorked) is a 1998 American drama film directed by John Huddles and starring Minnie Driver and Rufus Sewell.

== Cast ==
- Minnie Driver
- Rufus Sewell
- Nigel Hawthorne
- Amelia Heinle
- Michael E. Rodgers
- Keone Young
- Gregory Sporleder
- Chalvay Srichoom
- Elizabeth Tsing
- Jim Beaver
- Greg Grunberg
- Minja Filipovic

== Production ==
This was the first film made by Minnie and Kate Driver's production company Two Drivers.

== Reception ==
The film received mixed responses from critics.

Variety did not rate the film, writing: "As the hippest movies around savage the touchy-feely personal growth thing, the California-shot, Brit-seeming At Satchem Farm pours on the New Age malarkey in earnest. Pic, which co-stars Minnie Driver and lists her as an exec producer, couldn't be more out of sync with current indie or commercial themes. At once schizoid in feel (is this Evelyn Waugh satire or snooty Masterpiece Theater?) and schmaltzy to a fault, this talky, gorgeous-looking indie is suited to specialty audiences predisposed to its look-within message".
