= A Little Worm =

- Directed by: Marc Benardout
- Written by: Marc Benardout; Christopher West
- Produced by: Pamela Asbury; Marc Benardout
- Starring: Vincent Ricotta; Issy Van Randwyck
- Cinematography: David Kerr
- Edited by: Nicholas Wayman-Harris
- Music by: Julian Maurice Moore
- Production companies: Marc Benardout Films; Will van der Vlugt Film Productions
- Distributed by: Buena Vista International
- Release date: 1 March 1995; (with Ed Wood)
- Running time: 10 minutes
- Country: United Kingdom
- Language: English

A Little Worm is a 1995 British short film directed by Marc Benardout. It stars Vincent Riotta and Issy Van Randwyck. The short film was distributed theatrically by Buena Vista with the feature film Ed Wood by director Tim Burton. It was shown on television by Channel 4 on their series "The Shooting Gallery".

== Plot ==
In 1929, in Chicago, 12-year-old Larry Adler was heralded as a prodigy of the harmonica. Having left home for a life on the road and stage, Adler tagged along with his musical buddies to a party thrown at the apartment of underworld leader Al Capone.

When Capone spies the Young upstart he chastises him for turning up uninvited in front of all of his guests. In a moment of raw nerves, young Larry is unfazed and as a result, Capone's temper is thwarted and he rewards the boy with a drink at his table and an anecdote of jury bribery that went south. Unfortunately, this was a little above young Larry's head but he lived to tell the tale and won kudos from his peers.

== Cast ==
- Vincent Ricotta as Al Capone
- Aloys Kawadri as Larry Adler
- Issy van Randwyck as Angel
- David Rogers as Johnny Torrio
- Timothy Roland as the Juror
- Ray Morgan as Capone's Bodyguard

== Festivals ==
Sinner was chosen as an official selection in the Barcelona Film Festival, Hamptons Film Festival, Houston Worldfest, New York Albany Film Festival, Cork Film Festival, British Short Film Festival, Wrexham Film Festival (Wales), Huy Film Festival (Belgium), and Kino Film Festival.

== Awards ==
- Best Film, 1995 Barcelona Film Festival
- Best Cinematography, 1995 Barcelona Film Festival
- Best Actor, 1995 Barcelona Film Festival
- 2nd Place, 1995 Huy Film Festival, Belgium
- 4th Place, 1995 Houston Worldfest
