= Please (U2 song) =

1997 single by U2

Single by U2

from the album Pop
- Released: 22 September 1997
- Genre: Alternative rock
- Length: 5:01 (album version); 5:36 (single version)
- Label: Island
- Composer: U2
- Lyricists: Bono and The Edge
- Producers: Flood (album version only); Howie B

U2 singles chronology
"Last Night on Earth" (1997)	"Please" (1997)	"If God Will Send His Angels" (1997)

Music video
- "Please" on YouTube

"Please" is a song by Irish rock band U2. It is the eleventh track on their ninth album, Pop (1997), and was released as its fourth single on 22 September 1997 by Island Records. As with "Sunday Bloody Sunday", the song is about The Troubles in Northern Ireland. The single cover for this song features pictures of four Northern Irish politicians – Gerry Adams, David Trimble, Ian Paisley, and John Hume (clockwise from top left). Two months before the release of the single, live versions of "Please" and three other songs from the PopMart Tour were released on the Please: PopHeart Live EP in September 1997.

== Live performances ==
This song was played live during every performance of the PopMart Tour, with an outro similar to the drumbeat of "Sunday Bloody Sunday". Each performance segued directly into "Where the Streets Have No Name". During the Elevation Tour, the song was initially played in electric form before being played acoustically by Bono and the Edge at about 20 different shows. The song has not been played in full since the final show of the Elevation Tour. However, it was frequently sampled along with "The Hands That Built America" during "Bullet the Blue Sky" on the Vertigo Tour. It was later sampled in the outro of "I'll Go Crazy If I Don't Go Crazy Tonight" on the U2 360° Tour to lead into the beginning of fellow Northern Ireland Troubles song "Sunday Bloody Sunday".

== Critical reception ==
Kevin Courtney from Irish Times commented, "Still in subdued mood, Bono remonstrates with an imaginary lover about imagined wrongs, begging her to 'Please, get up off your knees'. The song is steeped in an atmosphere of suppressed sexuality, and The Edge restrains his guitar lines, as though dying to break loose from the chains of repression." British magazine Music Week rated the song four out of five and Alan Jones wrote, "U2's 'Please' has attracted more attention for its sleeve — depicting Northern Ireland's political leaders in Warholian style — than it has for its musical merit, which is a shame, since it's vintage U2, eschewing the dance beat which they have pursued of late in favor of a more traditional style. It's helped on its way by some fine guitar licks, and some nicely judged percussion work." David Fricke from Rolling Stone noted Bono's "arcing anguish" on the track.

== Formats and track listings ==
Cassette release
No.	Title	Length
1.	"Please" (Single version)	5:36
2.	"Dirty Day" (Junk Day mix)	4:41

International CD release
No.	Title	Length
1.	"Please" (Single version)	5:36
2.	"Dirty Day" (Junk Day mix)	4:41
3.	"Dirty Day" (Bitter Kiss mix)	4:32
4.	"I'm Not Your Baby" (Skysplitter dub)	5:47

American CD release
No.	Title	Length
1.	"Please" (Single version)	5:36
2.	"Please" (Live in Rotterdam, South Holland, the Netherlands, 18 July 1997)	7:11
3.	"Where the Streets Have No Name" (Live in Rotterdam, South Holland, the Netherlands, 18 July 1997)	6:33
4.	"With or Without You" (Live in Edmonton, Alberta, Canada, 14 June 1997)	4:38
5.	"Staring at the Sun" (Live in Rotterdam, South Holland, the Netherlands, 18 July 1997)	5:33

All lyrics are written by Bono & The Edge.

To Love And Only Love digital version
No.	Title	Length
1.	"Please" (single version)	5:49
2.	"Dirty Day" ("Bitter Kiss" remix by Butch Vig and Duke Erikson)	4:34
3.	"Dirty Day" ("Junk Day" remix by Butch Vig and Duke Erikson)	4:42
4.	"I'm Not Your Baby" (Skysplitter Dub)	5:50
5.	"Please" (Live from Rotterdam, 1997)	7:11
6.	"Where the Streets Have No Name" (Live from Rotterdam, 1997)	6:35
7.	"Staring at the Sun" (Live from Rotterdam, 1997)	5:33
Total length:		40:14

Note

- The four live tracks were previously released in other countries on the Please: PopHeart Live EP.

== B-sides ==
The "Please" singles were backed with the following B-sides:

=== "Dirty Day" ===
Two remixes of "Dirty Day" from Zooropa were made for the single, both by Butch Vig and Duke Erikson of the alternative rock group Garbage.

=== "I'm Not Your Baby" (Skysplitter Dub) ===
This song was recorded for the soundtrack for Wim Wenders' The End of Violence, in collaboration with Sinéad O'Connor. The version featured here is an instrumental remix, with few differences from the original version.

=== "Please" and "Where the Streets Have No Name" (Live from Rotterdam) ===
This performance was taken from the European première of the PopMart Tour on 18 July 1997 at Feijenoord Stadium, in Rotterdam, Netherlands. The middle eight in "Please" featured the drumbeat from "Sunday Bloody Sunday", and the outro, with Bono's falsetto, segued into the opening chords of "Where the Streets Have No Name", which was updated to an almost techno sound. The end of the performance included some lyrics from another song from Pop, "The Playboy Mansion".

=== "With or Without You" (Live from Edmonton) ===
This performance of "With or Without You" was taken from the first leg of the PopMart Tour in June 1997, at Commonwealth Stadium in Edmonton, Canada.

=== "Staring at the Sun" (Live from Rotterdam) ===
This performance of "Staring at the Sun", played by Bono and the Edge as part of an acoustic set at the PopMart concerts, was a departure from the version on the Pop album. It was a more subtle, vocal-orientated version, with only the two guitars and some harmonies during the choruses.

== Alternative versions ==
There are five versions of this song available:

- The album version, featured on Pop.
- The single version, on the single and video. This version was more similar to the live performances, with an orchestrated intro and the "Sunday Bloody Sunday" drumbeat on the middle eight. This version was recorded at the Wisseloord Studios in Hilversum, Netherlands.
- The USA edit, a special edit included on the US versions of the "Please" CD single. It is a more stripped down and shortened version of the single version. Its running time is 3 minutes, 55 seconds.
- The live performance from the 18 July 1997 concert in Rotterdam, also from the single.
- Another live performance, from the 3 December 1997 concert in Mexico City. This version appears on the Hasta la Vista Baby! album.

== Music videos ==
The accompanying music video for "Please" is a black-and-white concept piece by Anton Corbijn. It takes place on a street called "No Name" (a reference to the song "Where the Streets Have No Name") where a beggar is standing, with a sign saying "please" hanging from his neck. Several people pass by on their knees, until a point where this situation is reversed. The band actually does not show up for much of the video, finally making an appearance during the Edge's guitar solo. This video appears on the DVD for The Best of 1990-2000, along with the director's commentary.

Two live videos from the PopMart Tour have been released as well – one video from the PopMart: Live from Mexico City release, and one known as the "Mural Mix", (filmed in Helsinki on 9 August 1997), which was released on "The History Mix" bonus disc from The Best of 1990-2000 & B-Sides.

== Charts ==
=== Weekly charts ===
Chart (1997)	Peak position
Australia (ARIA)	21
Belgium (Ultratop 50 Flanders)	31
Canada Top Singles (RPM)	47
Canada Rock/Alternative (RPM)	25
Europe (Eurochart Hot 100)	26
Finland (Suomen virallinen lista)	7
France (SNEP)	31
Germany (GfK)	26
Hungary (Mahasz)	8
Ireland (IRMA)	6
Italy (Musica e Dischi)	17
Netherlands (Dutch Top 40)	11
Netherlands (Single Top 100)	6
New Zealand (Recorded Music NZ)	32
Norway (VG-lista)	15
Scottish Singles Sales (Official Charts)	5
Spain (AFYVE)	3
Sweden (Sverigetopplistan)	33
Switzerland (Schweizer Hitparade)	35
UK Singles (Official Charts)	7
US Alternative Airplay (Billboard)	31
US Bubbling Under Hot 100 (Billboard)	3
US Dance Singles Sales (Billboard)	9

=== Year-end charts ===
Chart (1997)	Position
Netherlands (Single Top 100)	47

== Release history ==
Region	Version(s)	Date	Format(s)	Label(s)	Ref.
United Kingdom	"Please"; PopHeart	22 September 1997	CD; cassette	Island	
Europe	"Please"	22 September 1997	CD	Island	
United States	"Please"	22 September 1997	Alternative radio	Island	
Australia	"Please"	29 September 1997	CD	Island; Mercury	
Canada	PopHeart	7 October 1997	CD	Island	
Australia	PopHeart	13 October 1997	CD	Island; Mercury	
Canada	"Please"	21 October 1997	CD	Island	
Japan	"Please"	25 October 1997	CD	Island	
Japan	PopHeart	24 November 1997	CD	Island	
United States	"Please"	25 November 1997	CD	Island	
