= Marc Benardout =

British film director and film producer

Marc Benardout is a British film director and film producer. He is a distant relative of the American composer Irving Berlin and the French science fiction writer Jules Verne.

Benardout began his film career working for director Adrian Lyne (Fatal Attraction, 9½ Weeks) at his production company Jennie & Co where he managed productions for commercial directors including John Lloyd (Blackadder). After a few years, he made the jump to directing himself and shot over 200 commercials and music videos in London and Amsterdam.

In 1995, he directed a short film entitled A Little Worm about harmonica virtuoso Larry Adler which won the Best Cinematography and Best Film awards at the Barcelona Film Festival amongst other accolades. A Little Worm was distributed theatrically by Buena Vista International with the film Ed Wood and aired on BBC Four for the series The Shooting Gallery.

Benardout made his feature film directing debut in 2007 with the drama film Sinner starring Nick Chinlund and Georgina Cates. Sinner, won the Best Feature Film Award at the 2007 Buffalo Niagara Film Festival. It was accepted as an official selection in the 2007 Vail Film Festival, 2007 Newport Beach Film Festival, 2007 Garden State Film Festival, 2007 Brooklyn Arts Council Film and Video Festival, 2007 Buffalo Niagara Film Festival and the 2007 Boston International Film Festival

Currently the producer of a movie based on Neil Shusterman's book, "UNWIND"

He resides in Los Angeles, California.

== Awards ==
- Best Director, Sinner, 2007 Boston International Film Festival
- Grand Jury Best Feature Film, Sinner, 2007 Buffalo Niagara Film Festival
- Best Narrative Film, Sinner, 41st Annual Brooklyn Arts Council International Film & Video Festival

== Filmography ==
As director:

- Sinner (2007)
- A Little Worm (short) (1995)
- Unwind (Pre-Production)
