= Zooropa (song) =

1993 song by U2

- Mexico promotional release

Promotional single by U2

from the album Zooropa
- Released: 5 July 1993
- Recorded: March–May 1993
- Studio: Windmill Lane (Dublin); The Factory (Dublin)
- Genre: Alternative rock
- Length: 6:30; 4:42 (edit)
- Label: Island
- Composer: U2
- Lyricist: Bono
- Producers: Flood; Brian Eno; The Edge

Audio sample
- file; help

"Zooropa" is a song by Irish rock band U2, and is the opening track from their 1993 album of the same name. The song was the result of combining two pieces of music, the first of which was conceived in the studio, and the second of which was a soundcheck recording from one of the group's concert tours that was discovered by guitarist the Edge. The lyrics were written by lead vocalist Bono and describe two characters in a brightly lit city in a futuristic version of European society. Some lyrics in the song were taken directly from advertising slogans, and they also featured the phrase "dream out loud", which has appeared in other U2 media. The song touched on several themes, including moral confusion and the future of European society.

Promotional recordings of the song were released in the United States and Mexico, and the song appeared on two record charts shortly after its release in 1993. The song was briefly performed at three shows on U2's Zoo TV Tour in 1993. The band had difficulties performing it in 1993, and it was not played again until the U2 360° Tour in 2011.

The recording of the song received mostly positive reception from critics, who praised it as the album's opening track.

== Background and recording ==
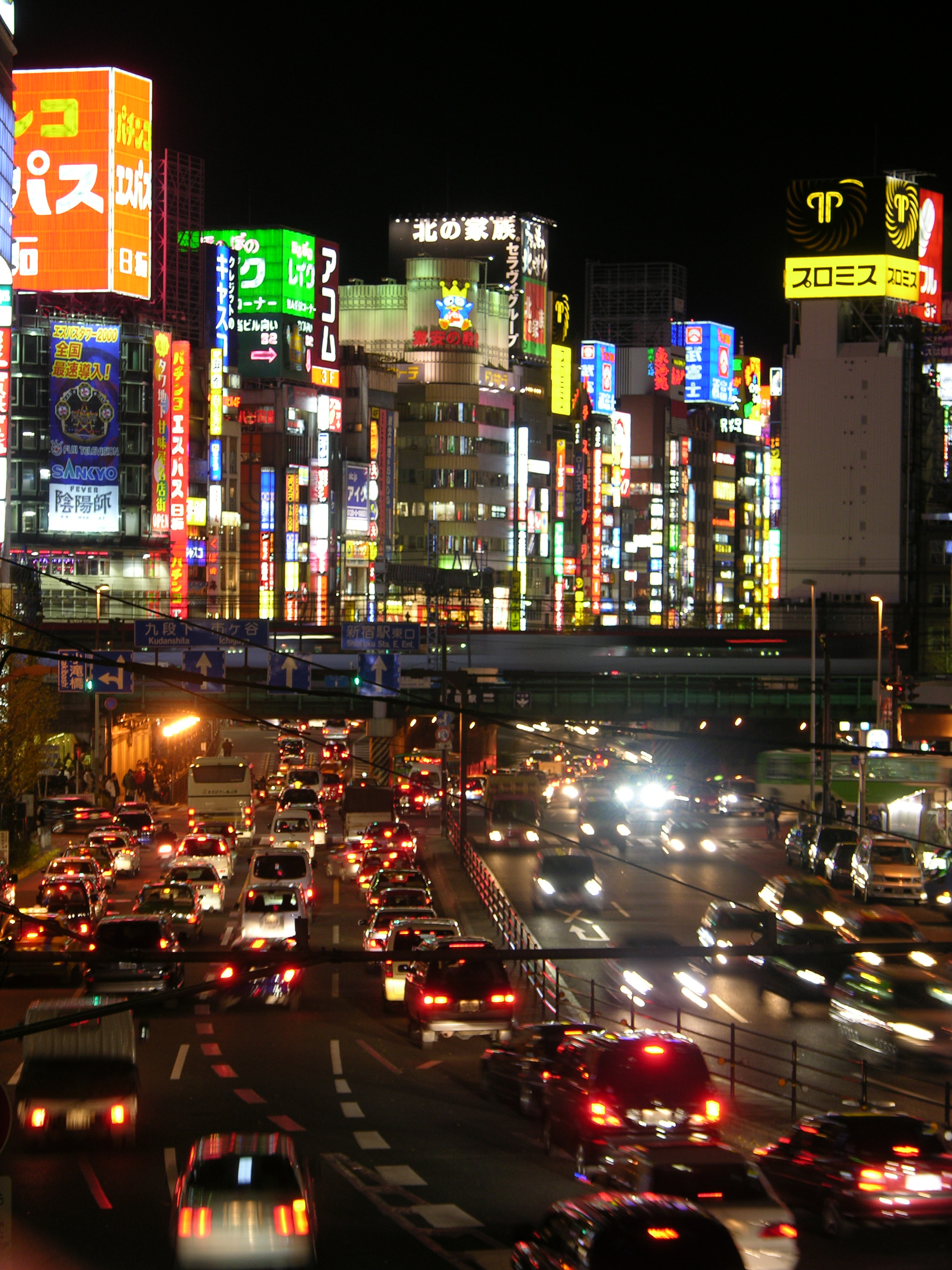
The song is set in a brightly lit city filled with advertisements, such as Tokyo.

During the Zoo TV Tour in 1992, U2 were trying to create a vision of an attractive future for Europe, as opposed to a negative, dystopian image that would be found in science fiction. With recent and ongoing events in Europe, such as the Revolutions of 1989, the enlargement of the European Union, and the Bosnian War, lead vocalist Bono created a surreal vision of a European location called "Zooropa". Bono has referred to Zooropa as being a concept album, with a main theme of the exploration of interpellation within the European Union.

"['Zooropa'] was our attempt to create a world rather than just songs and it's a beautiful world. The opening was our new manifesto [... and] the audio equivalent of Blade Runner's visuals. If you closed your eyes you could see the neon, the giant LED screens advertising all manner of ephemera."

— Bono

Bono and guitarist the Edge had been reading works by cyberpunk author William Gibson, who wrote about a futuristic urban environment known as "The Sprawl". Gibson was an influence in the texture of the song, which Bono described as "fucked up sci-fi". Bono wanted to use noise to create a visual setting for the song, similar to Gibson's futuristic world, filled with advertisements on LED displays and neon signs, as in the 1982 film Blade Runner. With "Zooropa" as the album's opening song, Bono stated that he wanted the album's music to be like "legal drugs" that would create a trip where "you come out of the other end and you feel like you've been on some kind of a journey". The closing song on the album, "The Wanderer", features Johnny Cash on vocals, and was intended on being the "antidote" to the futuristic-sounding opener.

"Zooropa" was written and recorded during the album's sessions at Windmill Lane Studios and The Factory Studios in Dublin, which took place from March to May 1993 between legs of the Zoo TV Tour. The song was created from two separate pieces of music. The first was a jam session recorded by the band in Dublin during the album's sessions. The second was a soundcheck the band had recorded a few years prior on tour in Australia or New Zealand that the Edge found while listening to cassette recordings of their soundchecks. Along with sound engineer Joe O'Herlihy, the Edge edited the best parts of the soundcheck using Sound Tools to create a song arrangement, which served as a backing track. The two-halves of the song were then edited into a stereo mix. Producer Flood created an atmospheric mix and then crossfaded it in with the song's "sombre, ethereal" introduction. The bass guitar in the intro was played by drummer Larry Mullen Jr. while the Edge was busy working on the album's guitar riffs.

Synthesizer sounds were added by producer Brian Eno on a Yamaha DX7 keyboard, including a "squishy, mad-synth sound" to create a "dovetail" connecting the different segments of the song. The Edge later added guitar tracks, as well as additional sounds to the song using an EMS Synthi A synthesiser. Once the song was almost finished, the band had doubts about the first half's backing track. Having established an arrangement for the song, they performed it again in the studio and used the new recording for the first half, while using portions of the new performance for the second half.

The band had originally intended on recording an EP during the sessions, but Zooropa eventually evolved into full-length album. "Zooropa" was one of five songs that were part of what would have become the band's EP, which also included "Babyface", "Numb", "Stay (Faraway, So Close!)", and "The Wanderer". Prior to the song's final title, it had the working title "Babble–Zooropa", as mentioned in a May 1993 issue of Hot Press, and was later titled "Zooropa I & II" in a June 1993 issue of Billboard.

== Composition and themes ==
"Zooropa" begins with a two-minute-long introduction. As the song fades in, sustained chords are played, and a noisy collage of mainly indecipherable human voices from radio signals fades in at 0:19. The background voices include a clip of George H. W. Bush saying "Peace talks", and are referenced in the album notes as "courtesy of the advertising world". A quiet piano and bass guitar are heard above the voices, which get louder with each beat. At 1:30, the volume of the voices rises suddenly and the bass part changes. The introduction then begins to fade out fifteen seconds later, while a guitar riff played with a delay and wah-wah effect joins the mix. The riff is briefly played on its own before the bass guitar and drums join in at 2:03. This is followed by background voices saying, "What do you want?" in both English and French ("Qu'est-ce que tu veux?"), and "De quoi as-tu peur?" ("What are you afraid of?"). In response to the questions, the lyrics in the first three verses of the song consist of various advertising slogans. At 3:45, following the first three verses, a break in the song's instrumentation occurs, except for guitar, and the song returns to a state similar to the introduction's end. A rapid rhythmic synthesiser fades in and at 4:03, the drums and bass re-enter and the song assumes an increased tempo. The theme of moral confusion and uncertainty becomes present in the remaining lyrics.

"There's this image of the 'overground'. It was a time when everyone was all indie and grey and dull—the 'underground'. The overground was like coming out into the bright light of a modern city. It's an amazing place to be, walking around these modern cities like Houston or Tokyo. And the idea was coming out into that, embracing it, going after it."

— Bono

The song describes two characters in a setting with a dull and grey appeal, who emerge from blinking neon signs into a brightly lit modern city. The radio sound effects in the introduction were intended to create a mood and setting for the song. DJ Carter Alan noted that the sounds seemed to draw a connection from Achtung Baby, but Bono stated that it was not intentional and that he didn't want it to have "anything to do with the past". The lyrics in "Zooropa" begin with the Audi advertising slogan "Vorsprung durch Technik" ("Advancement through technology") and the first three verses feature references to slogans for other brands, including Colgate, Daz, Fairy, and Zanussi.

Following the first three verses of advertising slogans, the song continues with the lyrics "I have no compass, and I have no map" and "No reason to get back", referring to the uncertainty of the new direction of U2's music at the time. The following verse begins with, "And I have no religion", which was included in the lyrics because Bono stated that he believes "religion is the enemy of God." A review of the album in Melody Maker compared the lyric "Uncertainty can be a guiding light" towards the end of the song to the line "If you walk away, [...] I will follow" from U2's 1980 single "I Will Follow". The reviewer stated "The man (Bono) that once had so many answers now sounds simply confused." The theme of moral confusion was first used in U2's song "Acrobat" from Achtung Baby. The coda in "Zooropa" features the lyric "dream out loud", which Bono included as a reference to "Acrobat". The phrase "dream out loud" was first used by Bono during the Lovetown Tour in 1989, and has appeared several times in U2's work since then. The phrase was also used in the song "Always" – a B-side to the "Beautiful Day" single released in 2000 — and was spoken by Bono in the PopMart: Live from Mexico City video.

== Release and chart performance ==
The cover art to the "Zooropa" promo released in Mexico features the circle of stars from the Flag of Europe.

"Zooropa" was the opening track from the eponymous album, and promotional recordings (promos) of the song were distributed by Island Records in the United States and Mexico. The U.S. promo features an edited version of the song that fades in at the first guitar riff (removing the intro), and the Mexico promo features the album version of the song, along with "Numb" as a second track. The cover art of the Mexico promo features the same logo from the Zooropa album cover—a sketch of the circle of stars from the Flag of Europe with an "astrobaby" figure in the middle, based on the "graffiti babyface" from the Achtung Baby album artwork. The logo represents an urban legend about a Soviet cosmonaut left floating in orbit for weeks after the collapse of the Soviet Union.

"Zooropa" was one of four songs from the album to be featured on the Billboard charts, and was the only song to chart that was not released as a single. On 24 July 1993, it appeared on the Album Rock Tracks chart at number 26, and remained on the chart for ten weeks, eventually peaking at number eight. "Zooropa" also appeared on the Modern Rock Tracks chart on 7 August 1993 at number 28, and peaked at number 13 during its eight weeks on the chart.

== Live performances ==
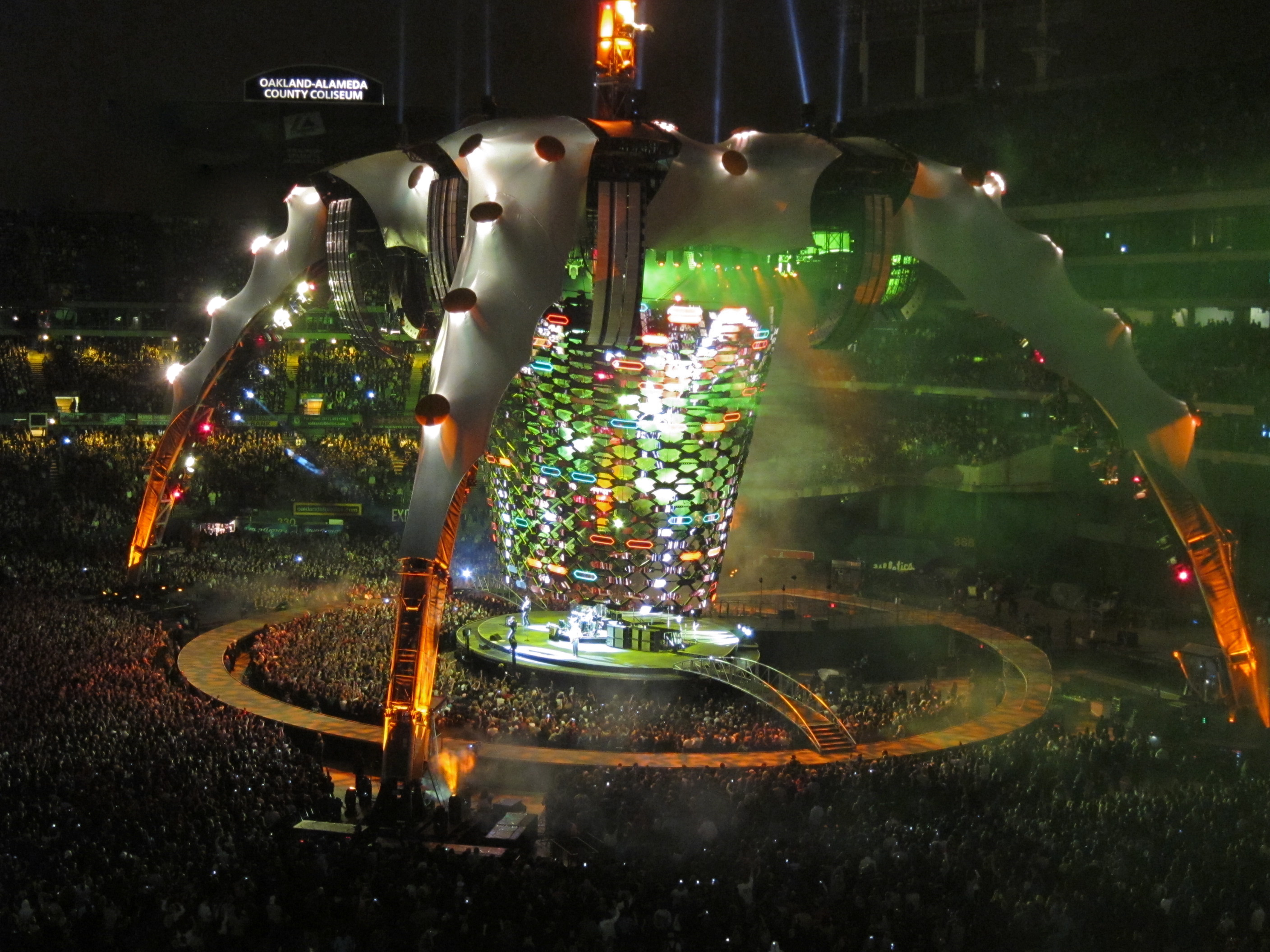
After an 18-year hiatus, U2 played "Zooropa" on the 360° Tour, where it was performed behind the stage's expanded video screen.

During the Zoo TV Tour, clips of "Zooropa" were played during the beginning of the show. The clips included the lyric "What do you want?" repeated twice, which was displayed on video screens in various languages, and interspersed with a voice saying "It's very simple". This part of the opening segment was intended to create confusion among the audience regarding the show's message, and eventually lead to information overload. U2 performed "Zooropa" live at three consecutive concerts during the fourth leg of the Zoo TV Tour in 1993. Bono originally discussed how the song would be played live during the album's recording sessions, saying that the Edge's guitar riffs may be extended in concert. The song debuted live at a concert in Glasgow in August 1993, and was performed in the middle of the set list following "Numb". The live version was much shorter than the album version, skipping the piano intro, as well as the first three verses, starting with the line "I have no compass, and I have no map". U2 had difficulty performing the song live, which Bono acknowledged to the audience following its debut. According to the book U2 Live: A Concert Documentary, the song's first performance sounded "shaky" and needed more rehearsal, although its subsequent Zoo TV performances "sound[ed] better". Bassist Adam Clayton suggested performing the song as the show opener during the rehearsals for the tour's fifth and final Zoomerang leg, but it was not performed again on the tour.

After Zoo TV, "Zooropa" was not performed live for 18 years until it was played towards the end of the U2 360° Tour in 2011. Clayton said that adding the song to the tour's set list was "very experimental" and that it was a "bit cheeky" to introduce to the tour as the band had little experience performing it. The song debuted on the tour on 10 April 2011 in São Paulo, and was rehearsed at soundchecks several days prior. The return of the song was so popular that the word "Zooropa" became a trending topic on Twitter during the evening of its tour debut. "Zooropa" was performed at the remaining 26 concerts on the tour, in addition to a private show in Denver. As of 2011, "Zooropa" has been performed live at 31 shows. During performances, the stage's 360° retractable video screen would expand its full length, and U2 would perform behind the screen as it took over the stage. The Edmonton Journal commented that by hiding themselves from the fans during the performance, the combination of advertising slogans and flickering lights "help portray this Blade Runner-type world that U2 wants us to escape." A live recording of "Zooropa" from the U2 360° Tour was featured on the U2.com member-exclusive album, U22, taken from the performance in Baltimore on 22 June 2011.

The song was not performed during the first leg of the Innocence + Experience Tour, but at the first show of the European leg in September 2015, a stripped-down version was performed during the second half of the concert. This interpretation of the song lacks the piano intro and first verses, serving as a segue from "Bullet the Blue Sky" into "Where the Streets Have No Name".

== Reception ==
=== Critical reception ===
David Sinclair of The Times and Anthony DeCurtis of Rolling Stone both felt that "Zooropa" set the album's tone from the start. DeCurtis described Bono's singing and lyrics as a "Mephistophelean seducer". Allmusic compared "Zooropa" to the anthems of U2's The Joshua Tree album, and Entertainment Weekly's David Browne described the song as "'Where the Streets Have No Name' transported into the land of cyberpunk", comparing parts of the song to the techno and metallic music genres. The Independent felt "Zooropa" was "a sprawling multi-sectioned piece that drifts from two minutes of gentle radio babble into a more familiar reverb-rock structure". Jon Pareles from The New York Times said that the track was reminiscent of old U2 songs, but added new elements such as distorted vocals and repeating guitar squealing. Daily Variety praised the title track over the rest of the songs on the album, stating how it was the only song that "explores the sort of melodic range usually associated with U2". In Vox, Max Bell wrote that the track "commences with bleeding channels of synthetic organ, a jabber of voices, treated piano, Arabic chants and a smattering of the Mullen/Clayton dub that underpins the band's increasingly rhythmical outlook." Commenting on the lyrics, Bell said its "resonances travel further and wider than doom-mongering."

=== Interpretations ===
"'Where the Streets Have No Name' is about the Kingdom of God. It is about eventual fulfilment and completion. It is about certainty, hope, and shalom. 'Zooropa,' on the other hand, offers no fulfilment, no certainty, no hope, no compass, no map, no religion. Zooropa is hell on earth."

— Robert Vagacs, author of Religious Nuts, Political Fanatics

Robert Vagacs, author of the book Religious Nuts, Political Fanatics: U2 in the Theological Perspective, describes the song as the antimatter of "Where the Streets Have No Name", in both musical and thematic aspects. Vagacs discusses the concept of Zooropa in detail throughout the book, and refers to Zooropa as a "wasteland" and a "dystopia", due to its lack of fulfilment and certainty. He also states how the Babylonian-like location uses its demigods to control its people through scientism, technicism, and economism. The final track from Achtung Baby, "Love Is Blindness", is described as "an interpretive bridge into the land of Zooropa", which Vagacs explains is the setting for the album, as well as the setting for songs on U2's following album, Pop. "Beautiful Day", the opening song from U2's 2000 album, All That You Can't Leave Behind, describes "a fresh start in Zooropa".

The use of consumer slogans as song lyrics was also commented on by various sources. Critic Perry Gettelman interpreted them as meaning to "signify the emptiness of modern, godless life". Kieran Keohane of York University stated that the slogans in "Zooropa" were to express an alienating form of interpellation, while J. D. Considine of The Baltimore Sun referred to the slogans as a parody of the economic hype used to pass the Maastricht Treaty, through the promising of impossibilities, such as "Be a winner" and "Eat to get slimmer". English professor Kurt Koenigsberger of Case Western Reserve University stated that the consumer advertisements constitute Zooropa as a "sardonically dystopic" location. In the book Reading Rock and Roll, Robyn Brothers said that the song conveys a "sense of confusion in the wake of a technology speeding beyond our control", while referencing the lyrics "I hear voices, ridiculous voices / I'm in the slipstream". Brothers also compared the song to "Acrobat", stating both songs reference a response to uncertainty and an unavoidable feeling of alienation.

=== Legacy ===
Zooropa producer Flood said that "Zooropa" was one of his favourite songs on the album, along with "Daddy's Gonna Pay for Your Crashed Car", "The First Time", and "Numb". Mullen felt that the song was "absolutely mesmerizing". Following the release of "Zooropa", references to the song have appeared in professional writings and in other media. On the day of the U2 concert in Sarajevo during the PopMart Tour in 1997, tour set designer Willie Williams wrote about waking up that day with "Zooropa" playing in his head and stated that Sarajevo "is the city of Zooropa, if there ever was one." José Manuel Barroso, president of the European Commission, quoted the song's lyrics at a 2005 press conference after enlisting Bono in an effort to get governments in the European Union to give more money to developing countries, and stated that the lyrics inspired an article he wrote about the future of Europe. Thomas Diez of the Copenhagen Peace Research Institute made references to "Zooropa"'s lyrics in a 1999 book review about the history of the European Union; lyrics also appeared in a 2005 German–English dictionary, under its listing for "Vorsprung durch Technik".

Kurt Koenigsberger's book The Novel and the Menagerie mentioned "Zooropa" in a section discussing Salman Rushdie and his appearance on the Zoo TV Tour. In 2008, the word "Zooropa" was used in an international finance textbook as the name of a fictional, generic city. The book Religious Nuts, Political Fanatics lists "Zooropa" as one of 22 U2 songs for "recommended listening". A 2009 review of U2's album No Line on the Horizon, MusicRadar described the song "Magnificent" as "'New Year's Day' meets 'Zooropa'".

== Formats and track listings ==
U.S. promo
| No. | Title | Lyrics | Music | Length |
|---|---|---|---|---|
| 1. | "Zooropa" (edit) | Bono | U2 | 4:42 |

Mexico promo
| No. | Title | Lyrics | Music | Length |
|---|---|---|---|---|
| 1. | "Zooropa" | Bono | U2 | 6:29 |
| 2. | "Numb" | The Edge | U2 | 4:17 |

== Personnel ==
U2

- Bono – vocals
- The Edge – guitar, piano, synthesisers, backing vocals
- Adam Clayton – bass guitar
- Larry Mullen Jr. – drums, percussion, bass guitar (Note: Larry Mullen, Jr.'s bass guitar performance was uncredited.)

Additional personnel

- Robbie Adams – engineering
- Brian Eno – synthesisers
- Flood – mixing, engineering
- Rob Kirwan – engineering assistance
- Willie Mannion – mixing assistance, engineering assistance
- Joe O'Herlihy – second half of backing track recording at soundcheck

== Charts ==
| Chart (1993) | Position |
|---|---|
| US Album Rock Tracks (Billboard) | 8 |
| US Modern Rock Tracks (Billboard) | 13 |
