= Dirty Day =

Song by U2

from the album Zooropa
- Released: 5 July 1993
- Genre: Alternative rock
- Length: 5:24
- Label: Island
- Composer(s): U2
- Lyricist(s): Bono; the Edge
- Producer(s): Flood; Brian Eno; the Edge

"Dirty Day" is a song by Irish alternative rock band U2. It is the ninth track on their 1993 studio album Zooropa. The music was written by the band as a whole, while the lyrics were written by Bono and the Edge. The song, along with "Numb", marks the Edge's first lyrical contributions to a U2 song since "Van Dieman's Land" on 1988's Rattle and Hum and indicated his growing presence as a second lyricist in the band; he would go on to contribute lyrics to every track on the band's next album, Pop.

Two alternate mixes of "Dirty Day" done by Butch Vig and Duke Erikson of the band Garbage, subtitled "Junk Day" and "Bitter Kiss" appeared on the "Please" single, with the former also appearing on the second disc of The Best of 1990-2000 & B-Sides. A re-recorded version of "Dirty Day" appeared on the band's album Songs of Surrender; it is one of two tracks from Zooropa, the other being "Stay (Faraway, So Close!)".

== Background ==
"Dirty Day" is in the key of D♭ and is played in common time at a tempo of 103 BPM. It is one of four songs on Zooropa mixed by Robbie Adams, alongside "Numb", "Some Days are Better than Others", and "The Wanderer". Bono alternates between his standard vocal range and a falsetto range during the verses and bridge. Layers of synthesizer play a sustained high A♭ note throughout the song, alongside a repeating unison guitar/bass riff by the Edge and Adam Clayton underpinning the song. The song was born out of jam sessions occurring during the album's creation.

Described by Bono as a "father and son song", the lyrics depict a father returning home to his abandoned son only to find that he is not recognized. The title of the song was inspired by a phrase commonly used by Bono's father, who was known to refer to bad days as a "dirty day". Other phrases appearing in the song, including "I don't know you and you don't know the half of it" and "no blood is thicker than ink" were also phrases commonly used by his father. The lyric "these days, days, days, run away like horses over the hill", repeated during the fade out, is a reference to The Days Run Away Like Wild Horses Over the Hill, a collection of poetry by writer Charles Bukowski.

== Reception ==
"Dirty Day" has garnered a generally positive reception from critics. Caryn Rose of Vulture placed the song at number 83 in her ranking of all 234 U2 songs, praising its "mix of contrasts", including the changes in dynamics between the intro and climax of the song and Bono's vocal performance. In their review of Zooropa, The Austin Chronicle felt the song, along with "Numb", saw the band "strik[e] an almost perfect balance between the avant-garde and tried and true."

== Live performances ==
After being performed during the 1993 "Zoomerang/New Zooland" leg of the Zoo TV Tour, "Dirty Day" remained absent from setlists for 25 years before returning for three shows on the Experience + Innocence Tour in 2018. During the performance, Bono spoke to the crowd about the band members' relationships with their fathers while growing up in Dublin; he then called out their names as they were shown on the stage's screen.

A performance of the song from Sydney, Australia appears on the video Zoo TV: Live from Sydney (1994).
