= Zoo TV: Live from Sydney =

1994 concert video by U2

- Cover to the standard edition DVD

Video by U2
- Released: 17 May 1994
- Recorded: 27 November 1993
- Venues: Sydney Football Stadium (Sydney, Australia)
- Genre: Rock
- Length: 118 minutes
- Labels: Island; PolyGram; UMG
- Director: David Mallet
- Producers: Ned O'Hanlon; Rocky Oldham

U2 chronology
Zooropa (1993)	Zoo TV: Live from Sydney (1994)	Melon: Remixes for Propaganda (1995)

Zoo TV: Live from Sydney is a concert film by Irish rock band U2. It was shot on 27 November 1993 at Sydney Football Stadium in Sydney, Australia, during the "Zoomerang" leg of the group's Zoo TV Tour. Directed by David Mallet, the concert was televised worldwide via pay-per-view, and was released on home video in May 1994 on VHS and Laserdisc.

U2 faced difficulties with booking their November 1993 concerts in Sydney, as the Sydney Cricket Ground Trust originally rejected the band's application to book Sydney Football Stadium. John Fahey, the Premier of New South Wales, personally intervened to allow the shows to take place. U2 and the production crew used the 26 November concert as a dress rehearsal for the official filming the following day. Matters were complicated when bassist Adam Clayton was unable to perform on 26 November due to an alcoholic blackout, forcing his bass guitar technician Stuart Morgan to fill in. It was the first time a member of U2 had missed one of their concerts since their earliest days; Clayton recovered in time for filming of the 27 November show. The group initially planned to produce a January 1994 "triplecast" of the concert with MTV to offer it from different perspectives on three different channels, but they ultimately cancelled it.

Zoo TV: Live from Sydney received favourable reviews from critics and won the Grammy Award for Best Music Video, Long Form in 1995. It received sales certifications of double platinum in Australia, and platinum in the United States, the United Kingdom, Argentina, and Brazil. In 2006, it was re-released on DVD, while also being issued as a live album entitled Zoo TV Live to subscribers of U2.com.

== Planning and filming ==
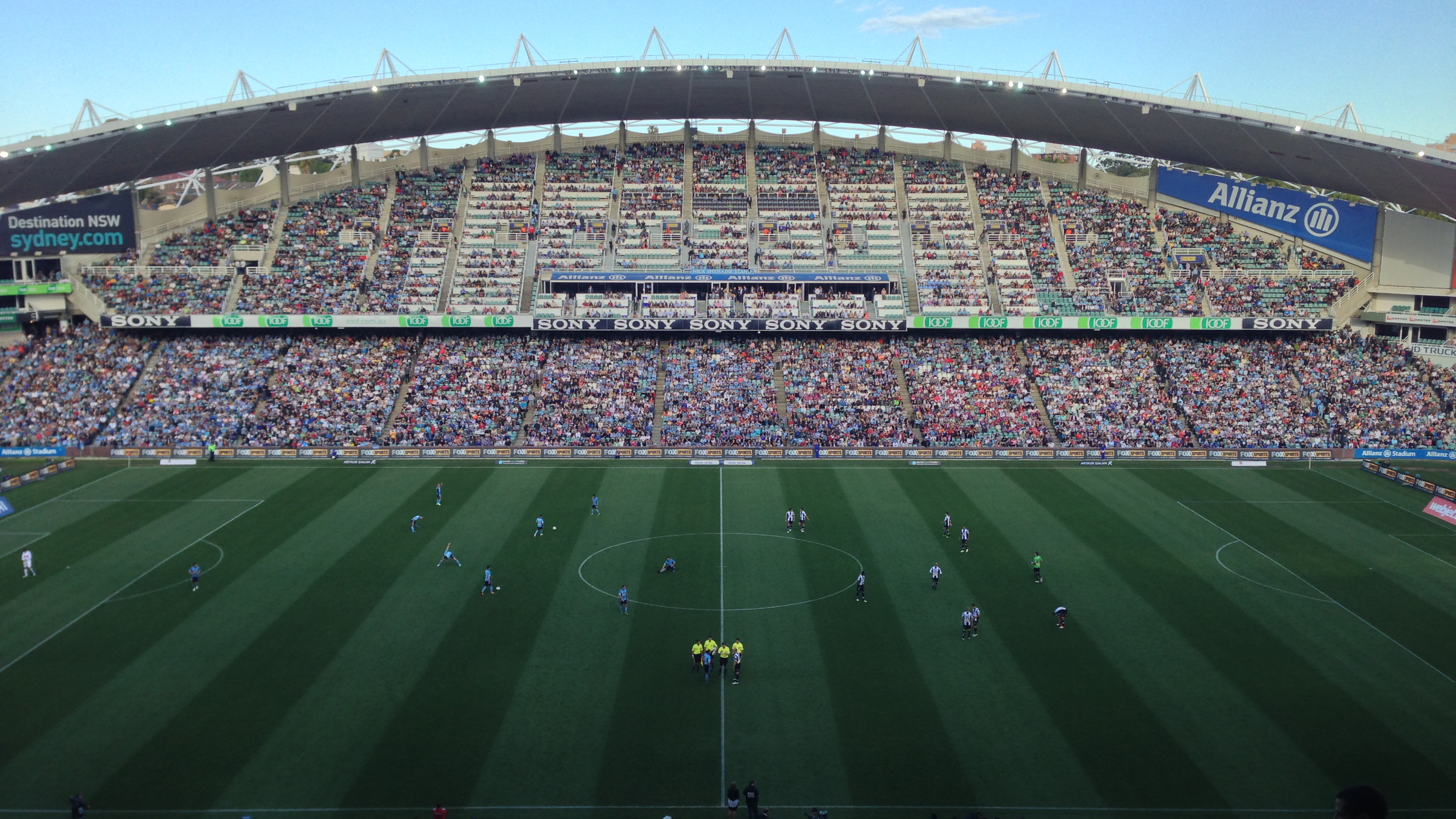
Sydney Football Stadium, the venue for the filmed performance

U2 faced difficulties with booking their November 1993 concerts in Sydney, Australia, where they wanted to stage a worldwide television broadcast to end the Zoo TV Tour. In early August 1993, after the Sydney Cricket Ground Trust rejected the band's application to perform at the Sydney Football Stadium in November, lead vocalist Bono publicly questioned the city's viability as a candidate to host the 2000 Summer Olympics; the trust's decision was made despite allowing concerts by Madonna and Michael Jackson to be held at Sydney Cricket Ground in November. U2 manager Paul McGuinness faxed all 29 members of the Sydney Olympics 2000 Bid Committee to inform them of the situation. John Fahey, the Premier of New South Wales, personally intervened to allow the Sydney concerts to take place, and an announcement was made on 15 August confirming them. Tickets went on sale on 23 August.

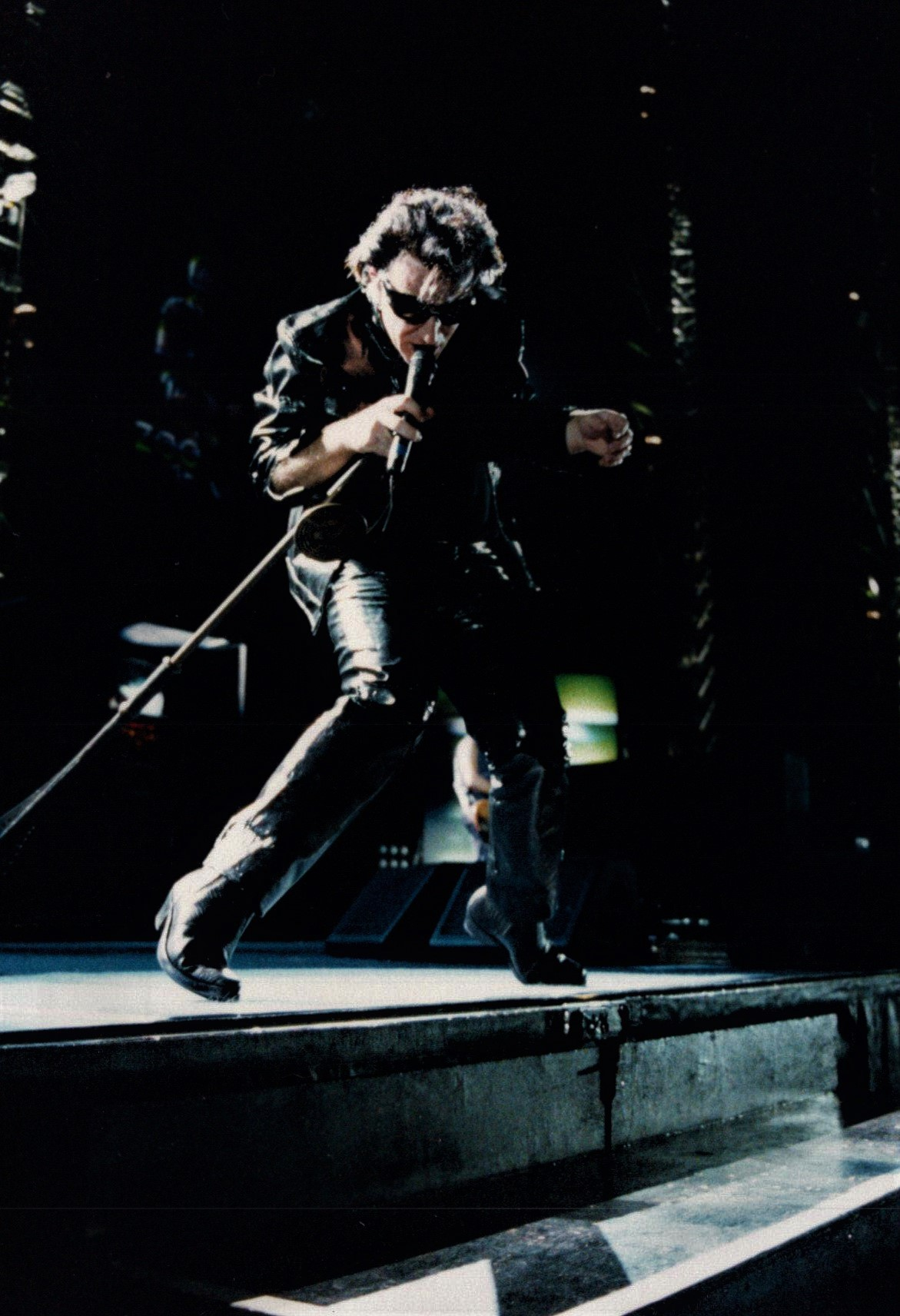
Bono during a performance in Melbourne on 13 November 1993, two weeks before filming of Zoo TV: Live from Sydney

The band's two November 1993 concerts in Sydney were filmed on consecutive nights as part of the television broadcast. The 26 November concert was staged as a rehearsal for the production crew in advance of the official filming the following night. However, bassist Adam Clayton, who began drinking excessively on the latter stages of the tour, was unable to perform on 26 November after experiencing an alcoholic blackout. The band ruled out canceling the show, since it was the only opportunity for the production crew to do a dry run of the filming. Bass guitar technician Stuart Morgan filled in for Clayton instead, marking the first time a member of U2 had missed a concert since their earliest days. Clayton recovered in time to play the 27 November show, which was broadcast in the United States on tape-delayed pay-per-view. U2 originally planned to produce the concert with MTV for a January 1994 "triplecast" that would have offered three different perspectives of the show on three separate television channels. After realising they had not fully developed the concept, the group cancelled the "triplecast", denying themselves income that was supposed to make the Pacific leg of the tour profitable.

Years later in a Rolling Stone interview, Bono discussed the concert and its significance to the band. Clayton's absence the previous night had caused a real issue within the band, and they were all wondering what the long-term impact would be. Bono said he was unsure that they would ever play live again – he realized during the show that it could be the band's last live performance.

== Release ==
All tracks played on that night appeared on the video, with the exception of "Tryin' to Throw Your Arms Around the World", which was played between "Numb" and "Angel of Harlem". Many speculate it was omitted because of a controversy about Bono sharing a glass of champagne with an underage girl on-stage, while others believe that the band was unsatisfied with their performance. However, producer Ned O'Hanlon stated in an online chat in 1996 that the concert was too long and needed to be cut for the video release.

There was controversy in Japan after the video aired on television; in August 2007, Zoo TV set designer Willie Williams confirmed that no offensive phrase towards Japan was ever part of the Zoo TV show, and that it was simply a figment of a reporter's imagination after viewing the hundreds of random words displayed during the song. In reality, the words displayed were shown in the following sequence — BOMB / WHORE / ULTIMATELY / JAPAN / CHAOS / I / WANT / IT / NOW — which caused the reporter to mistakenly "see" the reported offensive phrase.

After being broadcast on TV, the show was first released in May 1994 on VHS and Laserdisc.

Zoo TV: Live from Sydney was one of the first titles slated for release in the DVD format in 1997/1998, and previews for it appeared on PolyGram DVDs of the time. But the PolyGram release was canceled. It was released on 18 September 2006 under the Island Records label. The DVD was released in a one- and two-disc edition, similar to the DVD release of Vertigo 2005: Live from Chicago. Both editions featured the concert in its original 4:3 aspect ratio, remixed with Dolby Digital 5.1, DTS 5.1, and PCM Stereo audio.

The "super deluxe edition" and "Uber edition" of the Achtung Baby 20th anniversary reissue, which were released in November 2011, contain Zoo TV: Live from Sydney as one of four bonus DVDs.

To commemorate the 30th anniversary of the band's 1993 album Zooropa, on 12 July 2023 the Zoo TV: Live from Sydney concert was live streamed globally.

== Critical reception ==
Professional ratings
Review scores
Source	Rating
AllMusic	4.5/5 stars
CMJ New Music Monthly (2006)	Rent
Entertainment Weekly	B−
IGN (2006)	9.0/10
PopMatters (2006)	8/10
The Province (2006)	B
Rolling Stone (2006)	4/4 stars
St. Louis Post-Dispatch (2006)	3.5/4 stars
The Sun-Herald	3.5/4 stars
Video Librarian (2006)	4/4 stars

Zoo TV: Live from Sydney received favourable reviews from critics. Reviewing the VHS release, Richard Harrington of The Washington Post said, "Though not better than the real thing, this is a solid approximation of U2's long-running, state-of-several arts world tour, the one that set technological standards that Pink Floyd and the Rolling Stones will be hard-pressed to match." He judged that "Occasionally, frenetic editing undermines U2's intentions, which are both entertainment and challenge", but thought that overall "this film captures a great band in great, definitive performance". Brett Thomas of The Sun-Herald said, "The sheet vastness and technological gadgetry of the Zoo TV tour presents an obvious problem when transferring it to the small screen, so this video may be less effective for those who didn't see the production first hand. But as far as producing an engrossing, stirring rock concert, U2 show they have few peers." Mark Brown of the Orange County Register called it "the real thing — more than two hours of glorious, uninterrupted U2 concert footage". Brown said, "throughout you get the front-row spectacle of the stunning Zoo tour. Most music videos are hard to watch more than once; this one demands repeated viewing." Catherine Applefeld of Billboard said, "The 28 cameras that were employed... at first blush might seem a bit excessive, but just minutes into this video masterpiece, viewers will be praising the merits of each and every one." Applefeld described the show as "A veritable blizzard of hi-tech artistry" and thought the set list covered the band's repertoire well. Amy Linden of Entertainment Weekly said, "Although U2 is in fine musical form... the emphasis... isn't on the band's chops, but rather on their chips (as in computers)". She thought that the tour's "high-tech hoopla slowly eats away at what is actually a powerful performance" and that the group used video clichés with a "pretentious smugness".

Reviewing the DVD re-release, Andrew Perry of The Daily Telegraph said, "U2's Zoo TV extravaganza is widely regarded as the greatest rock tour ever staged. This full concert... should amaze anyone who missed it." Perry praised the group's performances, saying, "U2 deal out their early stadium classics and Achtung Baby-era novelties with equal majesty". Bernard Zuel of The Sydney Morning Herald called the Zoo TV Tour "the most spectacular show the Irish band (or any act, for that matter) had staged". He added, "Perhaps appropriately, seeing this concert on TV may be a better way of taking it in than seeing it in the flesh." Daniel Durchholz of the St. Louis Post-Dispatch said, "On DVD at last, 'Zoo TV' chronicles... one of the most ambitious tours ever", adding that it "can't really capture how overwhelming the 1992 show was in person, but it's still pretty mind-blowing". Randy Pitman of Video Librarian called the concert a "tour de force performance" and said "this landmark concert from one of the premier rock bands of the past quarter century is highly recommended". Stuart Derdeyn of The Province said, "They don't make tours like this anymore", praising performances of songs such as "Mysterious Ways" as well as the DVD's bonus materials. He concluded, "If the point the band was trying to make was that we should watch less TV, it failed. If it was trying to predict the even more image-heavy assault on the future, bang-on, lads." Neal Hayes of PopMatters called the DVD a "must-purchase for U2 fans" and said that even non-U2 fans "will find much to appreciate, and maybe even love, on this disc". He praised the audio and video quality as well as the bonus materials, and said that the concert "shows a band at the absolute height of its power" musically. Brent Simon of IGN said that the concert "serves as ample, extravagant evidence of [U2's] overwhelming talent", calling it "an undeniably great show, superbly captured", despite "stylistic directorial flourishes that sometimes come off as too affected". Andy Greene of Rolling Stone said of their Zoo TV performance, "The resulting sensory overload remains a high point in the band's history."

== Track listing ==
1. Show Opening
2. "Zoo Station"
3. "The Fly"
4. "Even Better Than the Real Thing"
5. "Mysterious Ways"
6. "One"
7. "Unchained Melody"
8. "Until the End of the World"
9. "New Year's Day"
10. "Numb"
11. "Angel of Harlem"
12. "Stay (Faraway, So Close!)"
13. "Satellite of Love"
14. "Dirty Day"
15. "Bullet the Blue Sky"
16. "Running to Stand Still"
17. "Where the Streets Have No Name"
18. "Pride (In the Name of Love)"
19. "Daddy's Gonna Pay for Your Crashed Car"
20. "Lemon"
21. "With or Without You"
22. "Love Is Blindness"
23. "Can't Help Falling in Love"

== DVD bonus materials ==
The two-disc DVD release featured the following bonus features on disc two:

- Bonus Tracks
  - "Tryin' to Throw Your Arms Around the World" and "Desire" — taken live from the Zoo TV Special, Yankee Stadium, New York, 29 and 30 August 1992
  - "The Fly" and "Even Better Than the Real Thing" — taken live from the "Stop Sellafield" Concert, G-Mex Centre, Manchester, 19 June 1992
- Documentaries
  - A Fistful of ZooTV
  - ZooTV – The Inside Story
  - Trabantland
- Extras
  - Video Confessional
  - "Numb" karaoke video remix
  - DVD-ROM features
    - 4 Wallpapers
    - 2 Screensavers
  - Easter eggs

There are three easter eggs. These are: all three parts of the Interference documentary from the 1992 Achtung Baby video release; a 75-second video of war-themed warning drills; and a time lapse video of the Zoo TV stage being constructed and disassembled, set to the band's song "Some Days Are Better Than Others".

== Audio release ==
Zoo TV Live

Live album by U2
- Released: 18 November 2006
- Recorded: 27 November 1993
- Venues: Sydney Football Stadium (Sydney, Australia)
- Genre: Rock
- Length: 118:31
- Label: U2.com

U2 chronology
Vertigo 2005: Live from Chicago (2005)	Zoo TV Live (2006)	U218 Videos (2006)

The music from Zoo TV: Live from Sydney was released on a two-disc album titled Zoo TV Live, also known as Zoo2Live. It was released exclusively to subscribing members of U2.com on 18 November 2006. The album features 25 tracks, including all 22 songs performed in the video, plus a track for the show opening audio, the Macphisto speech, and a bonus track of "Tryin' to Throw Your Arms Around the World", recorded in New York for the Zoo TV Special in August 1992.

== Charts and certifications ==
=== Weekly charts ===
Chart (1994)	Peak position
UK Music Videos (Official Charts)	1
UK Official Video Chart Top 100	2
US Top Video Sales (Billboard)	4

Chart (2006)	Peak position
Austrian Music DVD (Ö3 Austria)	1
Belgian Music DVD (Ultratop Wallonia)	1
Belgian Music DVD (Ultratop Flanders)	1
Danish Music DVD (Hitlisten)	1
Dutch Music DVD (MegaCharts)	1
Finnish Music DVD (Suomen virallinen lista)	2
German Albums (Offizielle Top 100)	32
Hungarian DVDs (MAHASZ)	1
Italian Music DVD (FIMI)	2
Japanese DVDs Chart (Oricon)	48
Spanish Music DVD (Promusicae)	1
Swedish Music DVD (Sverigetopplistan)	1
Swiss Albums (Schweizer Hitparade)	77
US Top Music Videos (Billboard)	1

Chart (2009)	Peak position
French Music DVD (SNEP)	34

=== Year-end charts ===
Chart (2006)	Position
Australian Music DVD (ARIA)	18
Belgian Music DVD (Ultratop Flanders)	6
Belgian Music DVD (Ultratop Wallonia)	15
Dutch Music DVD (MegaCharts)	11
Swedish Music DVD (Sverigetopplistan)	33

Chart (2009)	Position
Swedish Music DVD (Sverigetopplistan)	100

=== Certifications and sales ===
Region	Certification	Certified units/sales
Argentina (CAPIF)	Platinum	8,000^{^}
Australia (ARIA)	2× Platinum	30,000^{^}
Brazil (Pro-Música Brasil)	Platinum	50,000^{*}
Italy	—	13,000
Mexico (AMPROFON)	Gold	10,000^{^}
Spain (Promusicae)	Gold	10,000^{^}
United Kingdom (BPI)	Platinum	50,000^{*}
United States (RIAA)	Platinum	100,000^{^}
^{*} Sales figures based on certification alone.^{^} Shipments figures based on certification alone.
