= Daddy's Gonna Pay for Your Crashed Car =

Song by U2

from the album Zooropa
- Released: 5 July 1993
- Recorded: March–May 1993
- Genre: Alternative rock, industrial rock, alternative dance
- Length: 5:20
- Label: Island
- Composer: U2
- Lyricist: Bono
- Producers: Flood; Brian Eno; The Edge

"Daddy's Gonna Pay for Your Crashed Car" is a song by Irish rock band U2 and the sixth track from their 1993 studio album Zooropa.

== Composition ==
"Daddy's Gonna Pay for Your Crashed Car" was conceived during the band's Zooropa sessions in early 1993. At the time, U2 intended to make Zooropa as an EP, but it quickly evolved into a full album. Bono described writing the song as an "industrial blues" type. The song begins with an introduction of brass instrumentation samples from the introduction to a Russian folk song, "Есть на Волге Утес" ("There's a Rock on the Volga"), performed by the Alexandrov Ensemble and included in a 1976 Melodiya LP box-set titled Любимые песни Ильича (Lenin's Favourite Songs), and MC 900 Ft. Jesus' "The City Sleeps" from the 1991 album Welcome to My Dream. After the introduction ends, The Edge and Larry Mullen Jr. start playing guitar and drums, respectively. There are moments of distortion and feedback throughout the song, particularly on Adam Clayton's bassline.

"Being involved in it, I always felt it was going to be a better song. Whereas, what it is is, it's a great feeling. I love the whole introduction: it's total experiment. And it sort of seems to lead you into a place that for me, personally, I was never quite sure it achieved where it was going to go to. I know for some people they absolutely love that, because it's not a "song" song, per se. But for other reasons there are so many sonic things on that track that if I detailed what was doing what, you wouldn't believe what was going on."

—Flood, on the production and reaction to the song.

Regarding the song's theme, Bono described it as being about dependence and heroin addiction. The Edge, however, said the meaning was not intended to be heroin but rather a commentary on dependency itself. In an interview with Pulse!, he explained, "It doesn't have to be illegal substances. You can be addicted to applause, you can be addicted to being on the road. I mean, being in U2 can be its own addiction. We have to recognize that. And there's a part of that in the lyrics. The image of Daddy is one of benevolence and in this song it's twisted around and become the thing that you're dependent on and that you look for support from".

== Reception ==
"Daddy's Gonna Pay for Your Crashed Car" received mostly positive reviews from critics. Parry Gettelman of the Orlando Sentinel felt it was among the better songs on Zooropa. The Independent's Andy Gill praised the song as one of the best album tracks, noting its resemblance to David Bowie's "Always Crashing in the Same Car". Allmusic's Stephen Thomas Erlewine cited the song's "quiet menace" as one of the album's highlights. Likewise, Annie Zaleski of The A.V. Club praised the song as "seductive" with "dank beats reminiscent of Beck's chaotic sound collages". David Fricke of Rolling Stone described the song as "a highly studio-processed piece of metallic dance rock grounded by a corrosive backward bass loop".

In retrospect, Flood admits the song could have been better, saying "I sort of wish it could have been more, but as an entity, it was brilliant."

== Live performances ==
After the release of Zooropa, "Daddy's Gonna Pay for Your Crashed Car" was one of five songs incorporated into the Zoomerang and New Zooland legs of the Zoo TV Tour. The 27 November 1993 performance can be seen on the 1994 concert film Zoo TV: Live From Sydney. During both legs, the song was performed in full for a total of ten times and snippeted at another five shows . As of 2019, it has not been played live since. However, a brief snippet of the song appeared at the 20 September 2005 Vertigo Tour concert, at some shows of the Experience + Innocence Tour and some ones of the Joshua Tree Tour 2019.

== In other media ==
The song was used in the soundtrack of Peter Greenaway's 1996 film The Pillow Book, but it was not included on the official soundtrack CD itself.
