= Zooropa =

1993 studio album by U2

Studio album by U2
- Released: 5 July 1993
- Recorded: February–May 1993 (Note: "Numb" basic tracks were recorded in 1990–1991 during Achtung Baby sessions)
- Studios: The Factory (Dublin); Windmill Lane (Dublin); Westland (Dublin)
- Genre: Alternative rock
- Length: 51:15
- Label: Island
- Producers: Flood; Brian Eno; The Edge

U2 chronology
Achtung Baby (1991)	Zooropa (1993)	Zoo TV: Live from Sydney (1994)

Singles from Zooropa
- 1. "Numb" Released: June 1993; 2. "Lemon" Released: 8 November 1993; 3. "Stay (Faraway, So Close!)" Released: 22 November 1993

Zooropa is the eighth studio album by the Irish rock band U2. Produced by Flood, Brian Eno, and the Edge, it was released on 5 July 1993 on Island Records. Inspired by the band's experiences on the Zoo TV Tour, Zooropa expanded on many of the tour's themes of technology and media oversaturation. The record was a continuation of the group's experimentation with alternative rock, electronic dance music, and electronic sound effects that began with their previous album, Achtung Baby, in 1991.

U2 began writing and recording Zooropa in Dublin in February 1993, during a six-month break between legs of the Zoo TV Tour. The record was originally intended as an EP to promote the "Zooropa" leg of the tour that was to begin in May 1993, but during the sessions, the group decided to extend the record to a full-length album. Pressed for time, U2 wrote and recorded at a rapid pace, with songs originating from many sources, including leftover material from the Achtung Baby sessions. The album was not completed in time for the tour's resumption, forcing the band to travel between Dublin and their tour destinations in May to complete mixing and recording.

Zooropa received generally favourable reviews from critics. Despite none of its three singles—"Numb", "Lemon", and "Stay (Faraway, So Close!)"—being hits consistently across regions, the record sold well upon release, charting in the top ten of 26 countries. The album's charting duration and lifetime sales of 7 million copies, however, were less than those of Achtung Baby. In 1994, Zooropa won the Grammy Award for Best Alternative Music Album. Although the record was a success and music journalists view it as one of the group's most creative works, the band regard it with mixed feelings.

== Background ==
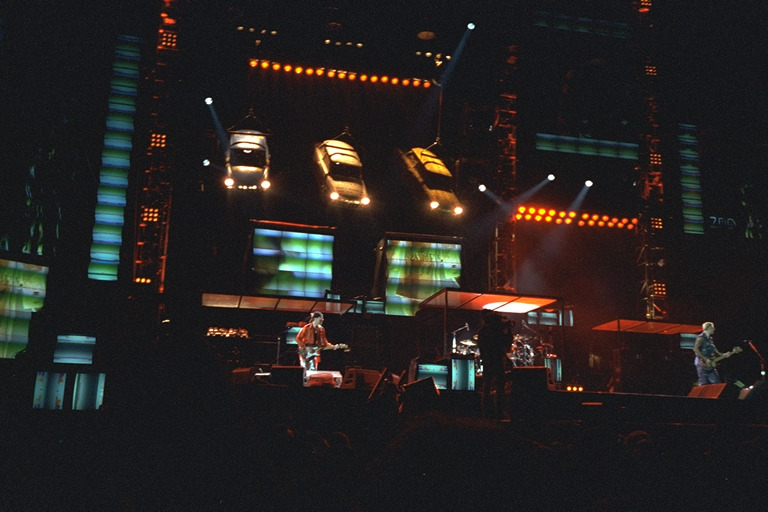
Zooropa was inspired by life on the multimedia-intensive Zoo TV Tour.

U2 regained critical favour with their commercially successful 1991 album Achtung Baby and the supporting Zoo TV Tour in 1992. The record was a musical reinvention for the group, incorporating influences from alternative rock, industrial music, and electronic dance music into their sound. The tour was an elaborately staged multimedia event that satirised television and the viewing public's overstimulation by attempting to instill "sensory overload" in its audience. The band finished 1992 with one of their most successful years, selling 2.9 million concert tickets and reaching 10 million copies sold for Achtung Baby. Their 73 North American concerts from the year grossed US$67 million, easily the highest amount for any touring artist in 1992.

The group concluded the North American "Outside Broadcast" leg of the tour on 25 November 1992, leaving them with a six-month break before the tour resumed in Europe in May 1993 with the "Zooropa" leg. Rather than use the time to rest, lead vocalist Bono and guitarist the Edge were keen to record new material. Following a hectic year of touring, the two did not want to settle back into domestic life. Bono said, "We thought we could live a normal life and then go back on the road [in May 1993]. But it turns out that your whole way of thinking, your whole body has been geared toward the madness of Zoo TV... So we decided to put the madness on a record. Everybody's head was spinning, so we thought, why not keep that momentum going...?" The Edge also wished to distract himself from the emotions he was feeling after separating from his wife during the Achtung Baby sessions in 1991. The other members, bassist Adam Clayton and drummer Larry Mullen, Jr., ultimately agreed to join them for recording.

== Recording and production ==
After handling audio engineering for the recording of Achtung Baby, Robbie Adams was invited by U2 to manage sound mixing on the Zoo TV Tour. Adams also recorded the group's tour soundchecks. In January 1993, the band asked him to compile these recordings and create loops of interesting parts that they could play to in the studio. After Adams spent a few weeks assembling loops, the group entered The Factory in Dublin that February to begin composing rough demos. Bono and the Edge were most involved during this initial demoing process, which lasted six weeks. Audio services company Audio Engineering installed recording equipment at the Factory that included a Soundcraft 6000 mixing console, an Otari MTR100 multi-track recorder, and four Neve console modules. The company also provided outboard gear such as a UREI 1176 Peak Limiter, a dbx 120X-DS subharmonic synthesizer, two Summit and two LA compressors, a Focusrite 115HD equaliser, a Yamaha SPX1000 multi-effects unit, Lexicon PCM-70 and AMS RMX-16 reverb units, and Yamaha NS-10 and EGV monitor speakers.

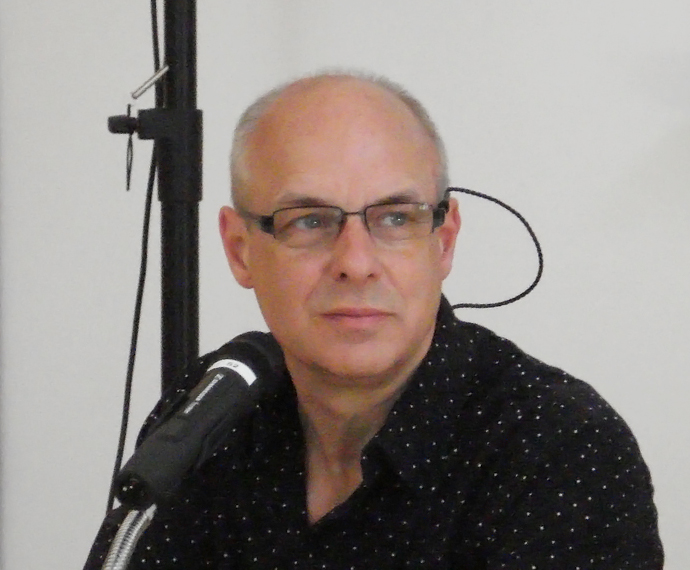
Zooropa was co-produced by Brian Eno (pictured in 2008), producer of 3 previous U2 albums.

The group employed Brian Eno and his assisting partner Mark "Flood" Ellis—both of whom worked on Achtung Baby—to produce the sessions; long-time Eno collaborator Daniel Lanois was busy promoting his solo album and was unavailable. Similar to the Achtung Baby sessions, Eno worked two-week shifts. The group often gave him in-progress songs to adjust and to which he could add his own personality. Initially, the band did not have a clear plan for how they would release the material being written. At the time, Clayton said, "I don't know if what we're doing here is the next U2 album or a bunch of rough sketches that in two years will turn into the demos for the next U2 album." The Edge was a proponent of making an EP of new material to promote the upcoming leg of the tour, describing his mentality as thus: "We've got a bit of time off. We've got some ideas hanging around from the last record, let's do an EP, maybe four new songs to spice the next phase of the tour up a bit. It'll be a fan thing. It'll be cool."

Soon after the sessions commenced, Bono pushed for the band to work towards a full-length album. The Edge was initially hesitant, but saw the opportunity as a challenge to quickly record an album before returning to tour and prove the band had not become spoiled by the luxury of ample recording time. Additionally, Bono and the band's manager Paul McGuinness had discussed the possibility of releasing a "one-two punch" of records since the beginning of the Achtung Baby sessions. In early March, U2 reached a consensus to work towards a full-length album. Much like they had for the Achtung Baby sessions, the band split work between two studios at once; Adams operated a Soundtracs mixing console at The Factory, while Flood used an SSL console at the newly relocated Windmill Lane Studios.

Due to the time limit, U2 were forced to write and record songs at a more rapid pace. They continued their long-time practice of jamming in the studio. Eno used an eraseable whiteboard to give instructions and cues to the band while they jammed; he pointed at chords and various commands, such as "hold", "stop", "change", and "change back", to direct their performances. Flood recorded the material, while Eno alternated between performing with U2 and joining Flood in the control room. At the end of a given week, Eno and Flood compared their notes and compiled the week's best jams onto a cassette for the band to listen to. The producers edited together their favourite sections of the jams and then discussed the arrangements with the group. U2 suggested alterations and added lyrics and melodies, before performing to the edited arrangements. To record all of the band's material and test different arrangements, the engineers utilised a technique they called "fatting", which allowed them to achieve more than 48 tracks of audio by using a 24-track analogue recording, a Fostex D20 timecode-capable DAT recorder, and an Adams Smith Zeta Three synchroniser; Adams went through 180 two-hour DAT tapes during the recording sessions. The production crew faced issues with audio spill at The Factory, as all group members recorded in the same room as the mixing desk and Bono frequently sang in-progress lyrics that would need to be replaced. Gobos and wood booths were built to separate the performers' sounds as much as possible.

"Some of the ideas we started out with on Achtung Baby started to come into focus on the tour as we played around with the new stage set, the TV screens, the whole concept of a TV station on the road. We found out what it could do and then we started playing around with the imagery and the ideas that were in the airstream, gleaned from the world of advertising, CNN, MTV and so on. It struck a chord in us and the music that came out on Zooropa was very influenced by the tour. Normally it's the other way around; you put an album together and then you go off on the road and you're drawing from the album for your inspiration."

— The Edge

Songs originated from and were inspired by a variety of sources. "Zooropa" was the result of combining two separate pieces of music together, one of which the band discovered while reviewing recordings of tour soundchecks. The verse melody to "Stay (Faraway, So Close!)" and an instrumental backing track that became "Numb" were originally from the Achtung Baby sessions. "Babyface", "Dirty Day", "Lemon", and "The Wanderer" were written during the Zooropa sessions. Country singer Johnny Cash recorded vocals for "The Wanderer" during a visit to Dublin, and although Bono recorded his own vocals for the song, he preferred Cash's version. The production crew and the band debated which version to include on the record. Throughout the sessions, U2 were undecided on a unifying musical style for the release, and as a result, they maintained three potential track listings—one for the best songs, one for "vibes", and one for a soundtrack album. Bono suggested editing the best segments of songs together to create a montage.

As May's "Zooropa" tour leg approached, U2 continued to record while simultaneously rehearsing for the tour. Their time limit prevented them from working on live arrangements for any of the new songs. Despite the sessions' rapid pace, the album was not completed by the time they had to resume touring. Moreover, Flood and Eno had to begin work on other projects. The Edge remembers everyone was telling the group, "Well, it's an EP. You did good but there's a lot more work needed to finish some of these songs." However, the band did not want to shelve the project, as they believed they were on a "creative roll" and that they would be in a completely different frame of mind if they revisited the material six months later.

The group's solution was to fly back and forth between Dublin and their concert destinations for about ten days to finish recording and mixing at night and during their off-days. Clayton called the process "about the craziest thing you could do to yourself", while Mullen said of it, "It was mad, but it was mad good, as opposed to mad bad." McGuinness later said the band had nearly wrecked themselves in the process. The group simultaneously used three separate rooms at Windmill Lane to mix, overdub, and edit. Adams said the hectic approach meant "there was never anybody sitting around waiting or doing nothing". Flood called the period one of "absolute lunacy". Eschewing console automation, the engineers adopted a "live performance" attitude to mixing, based on past experiences with Lanois. The band and production crew sat in on the mixing and offered encouragement, creating, as Adams put it, "a kind of cheerleader thing. It all induces a nervous energy in you and creates a lot of pressure, and gives the whole thing a performance feel." Flood had to depart about a week prior to the completion of mixing due to prior obligations to produce Nine Inch Nails in Los Angeles. The recording of Zooropa concluded on 14 May 1993.

In the final weeks, the band decided to exclude the traditional rock songs and guitar-driven tracks they had written in favour of an "album of disjointed, experimental pop". The Edge received a production credit—his first on a U2 record—for the extra level of responsibility he assumed for the album. Twenty songs were recorded during the sessions, but ultimately 10 were chosen for the final track listing. One piece that was left off the record was "In Cold Blood", which featured somber lyrics written by Bono in response to the Bosnian War and was previewed prior to the album's release. Other tracks that were left off the album included "Hold Me, Thrill Me, Kiss Me, Kill Me", "If God Will Send His Angels", "If You Wear That Velvet Dress", and "Wake Up Dead Man". The first was later released as a single from the Batman Forever soundtrack in 1995, and the latter three were included on the band's following studio album, Pop, in 1997.

== Composition ==
=== Music ===
"Zooropa"
The first half of "Zooropa" is set amongst the neon signs of a brightly lit futuristic city, with advertising slogans for lyrics. In the second half, the characters in the song express moral confusion.

"Lemon"
"Lemon" features an electronic sound and gated guitar effect, with lyrics about using technology to preserve time.

"Daddy's Gonna Pay For Your Crashed Car"
The noisy "Daddy's Gonna Pay For Your Crashed Car" was described by Bono as "industrial blues". The lyrical theme of the song is dependence.

With an even more "European" musical aesthetic than Achtung Baby, Zooropa is a further departure from the group's "rootsy" sound of the late 1980s. Much like how the group embraced technology for the Zoo TV Tour, they utilized technology as a musical resource to a greater extent on Zooropa. The record exhibits additional influences from alternative rock, electronic dance music, and industrial music—it is more synthesized than U2's past work, featuring various sound effects, audio loops, and use of synthesizers. In addition to the Edge playing synthesizer, Eno received credit for the instrument on six tracks.

The Edge's guitar playing on Zooropa marks a further shift away from his trademark style, highlighted by a heavier reliance on guitar effects and the songs' reduced emphasis on his guitar parts. The danceable "Lemon", called a "space-age German disco" by Stephen Thomas Erlewine, features a gated guitar part. The distorted "Daddy's Gonna Pay For Your Crashed Car" was described by Bono as "industrial blues". The instrumentation of the closing song, "The Wanderer", consists primarily of a synthesized bassline and was described by the group as resembling the "ultimate Holiday Inn band from hell". The song was sequenced as the final track because U2 wanted to end the album on a "musical joke".

Similar to how the Zoo TV Tour display screens sampled video footage from television programming, a number of songs from Zooropa sample audio. The introduction to the title track, "Zooropa", contains a noisy collage of indecipherable human voices from radio signals—credited to the "advertising world"—played over sustained synthesiser chords. The industrial-influenced "Numb" features a noisy backdrop of sampled, rhythmic noises, including "arcade sounds", a Walkman rewinding, and a Hitler Youth boy banging a bass drum in the 1935 propaganda film Triumph of the Will. "Daddy's Gonna Pay For Your Crashed Car" begins with a snippet of fanfare from Lenin's Favourite Songs and samples MC 900 Ft. Jesus' song "The City Sleeps".

The vocals on Zooropa are a further departure from U2's previous style. As Jon Pareles described, Bono "underplays his lung power" throughout the record, in contrast to his impassioned, belting vocals from past work. Additionally, in songs such as "Lemon" and "Numb", Bono sings in an operatic falsetto he calls the "Fat Lady" voice. Two tracks feature other people on lead vocals: for "Numb", the Edge provides lead vocals in the form of a droning, monotonous list of "don't" commands; for "The Wanderer", country musician Johnny Cash sings lead vocals, juxtaposing the electronic nature of the song with his haggard voice.

=== Lyrics ===
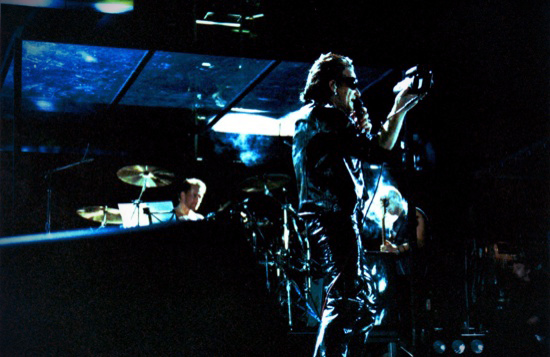
Bono filming himself with a video camera during a Melbourne concert in November 1993. For Zooropa, his lyrics drew from the mass media and technology themes of the Zoo TV Tour.

Bono is credited as the sole lyricist for eight of the ten songs, while the Edge received sole credit for "Numb". The duo share credits for the lyrics to "Dirty Day". Technology is a common theme on Zooropa, inspired by the group's experiences on the Zoo TV Tour. Jon Pareles wrote that the songs are about how "media messages infect characters' souls", while music journalist David Browne said the songs are concerned with "emotional fracturing in the techno-tronic age". Critic Robert Hilburn interpreted the album as U2 probing into what they saw as the "disillusionment of the modern age".

"Zooropa" is set amongst neon signs of a brightly lit futuristic city. In the song's introduction, background voices ask, "What do you want?" In response to the question, the lyrics in the first three verses consist of various advertising slogans, including, "Better by design", "Be all that you can be", and "Vorsprung durch technik". Critic Parry Gettelman interpreted these lines as meaning to "signify the emptiness of modern, godless life". In the song's second half, the theme of moral confusion and uncertainty is introduced, particularly in the lines "I have no compass / And I have no map".

"Babyface" is about a man practicing his obsessive love for a celebrity by manipulating her image on a TV recording. "Lemon", inspired by an old video of Bono's late mother in a lemon-coloured dress, describes man's attempts to preserve time through technology. This is reflected in lines such as, "A man makes a picture / A moving picture / Through the light projected he can see himself up close". The lyrics to "Numb" are a series of "don't" commands, amidst a noisy backdrop of sounds. The Edge notes that the song was inspired by one of the themes of Zoo TV, "that sense that you were getting bombarded with so much that you actually were finding yourself shutting down and unable to respond because there was so much imagery and information being thrown at you".

In contrast to the technology-inspired lyrics of many songs, others had more domestic themes. "The First Time" was Bono's interpretation of the story of the Prodigal son, but in his version, the son decides not to return home. Similarly, "Dirty Day" was written about a character who abandons his family and returns years later to meet his son. Many of the track's lyrics are taken from phrases that Bono's father commonly used, such as "No blood is thicker than ink" and "It won't last kissing time". "Stay (Faraway, So Close!)" is a love song written for an abused woman.

Bono based his lyrics to "The Wanderer" on the Old Testament's Book of Ecclesiastes, and he modeled the song's character after the book's narrator, "The Preacher". In the song, the narrator wanders through a post-apocalyptic world "in search of experience", sampling all facets of human culture and hoping to find meaning in life. Bono described the song as an "antidote to the Zooropa manifesto of uncertainty", and he believes it presents a possible solution to the uncertainty expressed earlier on the album.

== Packaging and title ==
The sleeve was designed by Works Associates of Dublin under the direction of Steve Averill, who had created the majority of U2's album covers. Brian Williams was the graphic designer and created the digital images and layout. Inspired by the Zoo TV Tour's "highly charged electronic TV images in all of their saturated colours and fizz", Works Associates conceived a "kind of electronic flag" for Zooropa. The cover features a sketch of the circle of stars from the Flag of Europe with an "astrobaby" drawing in the center. The illustration, created by Shaughn McGrath, was an alteration of the "graffiti babyface" by Charlie Whisker that was originally on the face of the Achtung Baby compact disc/vinyl record. The cover's drawing was meant to represent an urban legend of a Soviet cosmonaut supposedly left floating in orbit for weeks after the collapse of the Soviet Union. In the background is a montage of blurred images, similar to the arrangement of images on Achtung Baby's sleeve. The images include shots of a woman's face and mouth, as well as photographs of European leaders, including Vladimir Lenin, Benito Mussolini, and Nicolae Ceauşescu. These images are obscured by distorted purple text comprising the names of songs planned for the record that were provided to Works Associates during the sleeve design process. However, the album's track listing was eventually changed and the titles of several songs withheld from the album were accidentally left in the cover image; the songs include "Wake Up Dead Man", "Hold Me, Thrill Me, Kiss Me, Kill Me", and "If You Wear That Velvet Dress". Author Višnja Cogan described this text as giving the impression of a "torn veil".

Zooropa was named for the "Zooropa" leg of the Zoo TV Tour, which began in May 1993 while the band completed the record. The name is a portmanteau of "zoo" (from Zoo TV Tour and "Zoo Station") and "Europa". During the album's production, one of the proposed titles was Squeaky.

== Release ==
Zooropa completed U2's contractual obligation to Island Records, and to PolyGram, the multinational that purchased Island in 1989. Although the group were free to sign a new contract elsewhere, their strong relationship with the label and its founder Chris Blackwell prompted the band to remain with Island/Polygram by signing a long-term, six-album deal in June 1993. The Los Angeles Times estimated that the deal was worth $60 million to U2, making them the highest-paid rock group ever. At the time, the group were cognizant of several emerging technologies that would potentially impact the delivery and transmission of music to consumers in the following years. Author Bill Flanagan speculated, "Record stores could become obsolete as music is delivered over cable, telephone wires, or satellite transmissions directly into consumers' homes." With uncertainty over the future of these technologies and the implications of entertainment and telecommunications companies merging, the band negotiated with Island that the division of their earnings from future transmission systems would be flexible and decided upon at a relevant time. U2 toyed with the idea of releasing Zooropa as an interactive audio-video presentation in lieu of conventional physical formats, but the deadline imposed by the Zoo TV Tour prevented the band from realising this idea.

U2's delivery of Zooropa in late May caught PolyGram off-guard, because they were not expecting a new U2 album for several years. With Achtung Baby, PolyGram had approximately six months to market the record and plan its release strategy, but the sudden completion of Zooropa necessitated a more hurried promotional plan. PolyGram president/CEO Rick Dobbis said: "For the last one, we prepared for six months. It was like a marathon. But this is like a sprint, and that is the spirit it was made in. The band was so excited about it, they sprinted to complete the album before the ... tour. We want to bring it to the street with that same spirit." Island/PolyGram's and U2's marketing for Zooropa was intended to focus less on singles and more on the record as a whole, and ultimately, only three singles were released, compared to Achtung Baby's five singles. The first single "Numb" was released in June 1993 exclusively on VHS as a "video single". The music video was directed by Kevin Godley. The song peaked at number seven in Australia and number nine in Canada, while reaching number two on the US Billboard Modern Rock Tracks chart. However, it failed to chart on the singles charts in the UK or US.

Zooropa was released on 5 July 1993, during the Zooropa leg of the Zoo TV Tour. An initial shipment of 1.6 million copies was made available in stores at the time of release. Two additional commercial singles were released from the album. "Lemon" received a limited commercial release in North America, Australia, and Japan in September 1993. The single peaked at number six in Australia and number three on the Modern Rock Tracks chart. The final commercial single was "Stay (Faraway, So Close!)", released worldwide on 22 November 1993. It was the album's most successful single, topping the Irish Singles Chart and peaking at number five in Australia, number six in New Zealand, number four in the UK, and number 61 in the US—making it the record's only single to chart on the UK Singles Chart and Hot 100. "Zooropa" was released as a promotional single in Mexico and the United States.

=== Reissues ===
In October 2011, Achtung Baby was reissued to commemorate its 20th anniversary; CD copies of Zooropa were included in the "Super Deluxe" and "Über Deluxe" editions of the release. Continuing a campaign by U2 to reissue all of their records on vinyl, Zooropa was re-released on two 180-gram vinyl records on 27 July 2018. Remastered under the Edge's direction, the reissue included two remixes to commemorate the album's 25th anniversary: "Lemon (The Perfecto Mix)" and "Numb (Gimme Some More Dignity Mix)". Each copy includes a download card that can be used to redeem a digital copy of the album. To commemorate the album's 30th anniversary, in October 2023 the group released a limited-edition yellow vinyl pressing of the album containing a new photo from 1993 on the inner gatefold.

== Reception ==
Contemporaneous professional reviews
Review scores
Source	Rating
Chicago Sun-Times	3.5/4 stars
Entertainment Weekly	A
Los Angeles Times	4/4 stars
Music Week	5/5 stars
The New Zealand Herald	3/5 stars
Orlando Sentinel	3/5 stars
Q	4/5 stars
Rolling Stone	4/5 stars
Select	4/5 medals
The Village Voice	B−
Vox	9/10

Zooropa received generally favourable reviews. Anthony DeCurtis of Rolling Stone wrote in his four-star review that the album was "a daring, imaginative coda to Achtung Baby" and that "it is varied and vigorously experimental, but its charged mood of giddy anarchy suffused with barely suppressed dread provides a compelling, unifying thread". Spin wrote a positive review, commenting that the record "sounds mostly like a band shedding its skin, trying on different selves for size". The review said the album "has the feel of real collectivity", praising the cohesiveness of the individual band members' playing. The review concluded by saying Zooropa "indicates U2 might be worthy of whatever absurd mutations the '90s throw our way". Jon Pareles of The New York Times praised the group for transforming themselves and becoming "raucous, playful and ready to kick its old habits". Pareles enjoyed the sonics and electronic effects that made the "sound of a straightforward four-man band ... hard to find", and he commented that "The new songs seem destined not for stadiums ... but for late-night radio shows and private listenings through earphones." The Orlando Sentinel gave the record a rating of three-out-of-five stars, commenting, "Although U2 leans heavily on the electronic sound of contemporary dance music, the rhythm tracks on Zooropa are less than propulsive." The review said that Eno's production and the electronic flourishes made the album interesting, but that ultimately, "there's nothing especially hummable" and "the songs are not very memorable".

David Browne of Entertainment Weekly gave Zooropa an "A", calling it "harried, spontaneous-sounding, and ultimately exhilarating album". Browne judged it to sound "messy" and "disconnected", but clarified "that sense of incoherence is the point" in the context of the record's technology themes. He concluded, "For an album that wasn't meant to be an album, it's quite an album." Robert Hilburn of the Los Angeles Times gave the record a maximum score of four stars. In two separate articles, he said that it "captured the anxious, even paranoid tone of the Zoo TV Tour" so much so that "it stands as the first tour album that doesn't include any of the songs from the tour" and yet sounds like a "souvenir" of Zoo TV. In a positive review, Jim Sullivan of The Boston Globe called the album a "creative stretch", noting that the band experimented more yet retained their recognizable sound. He commented that the group's "yearning anthemic reach" and "obvious, slinky pop charm" were replaced with "darker corners, more disruptive interjections, more moodiness". Paul Du Noyer of Q gave Zooropa a score of four-out-of-five stars, finding a "freewheeling feel of going with the flow" throughout the album and calling it "rootless and loose, restless and unsettled". For Du Noyer, U2 sounded "monstrously tight as a performing unit and fluidly inventive as composers, so the results transcend the merely experimental".

A review from The New Zealand Herald was more critical, saying that the album started as an EP and "just got longer but not necessarily better". The publication called it "more perplexing than challenging" and commented that it "sounds like the biggest band in the world having one of the biggest, strangest mid-life crises". Jim DeRogatis of the Chicago Sun Times gave the record a three-and-a-half star review, calling it "inconsistent", but admitting "it's satisfying and surprising to hear a band of U2's status being so playful, experimental, and downright weird". Robert Christgau gave the album a B−, calling it "half an Eno album" in the same manner that David Bowie's Eno-produced albums Low and "Heroes" were, but saying, "The difference is that Bowie and Eno were fresher in 1977 than Bono and Eno are today." The Irish media were more critical; George Byrne of the Irish Independent said, "The songs sound like they were knocked up in double-quick time and with about as much thought put into the lyrics as goes into a DJ's timecheck." Byrne said the record resembles "a lot of mickey-taking over a variety of drum patterns". In a retrospective four-star review, Stephen Thomas Erlewine of AllMusic wrote that "most of the record is far more daring than its predecessor". For him, although there were moments that the album was "unfocused and meandering ... the best moments of Zooropa rank among U2's most inspired and rewarding music".

=== Accolades ===
Zooropa finished in 9th place on the "Best Albums" list from The Village Voice's 1993 Pazz & Jop critics' poll. At the 36th Annual Grammy Awards, it won the award for Best Alternative Music Album. In his acceptance speech, Bono sarcastically mocked the "alternative" characterisation the album received and used a profanity on live television: "I think I'd like to give a message to the young people of America. And that is: We shall continue to abuse our position and fuck up the mainstream." Zooropa was also nominated for Album of the Year at the 1993 GAFFA Awards in Denmark.

== Commercial performance ==
The album performed well commercially, debuting at number one in the United States, United Kingdom, Canada, Australia, New Zealand, France, Germany, Austria, Sweden, and Switzerland. It also reached number one in the Netherlands, Italy, Japan, Norway, Denmark, Ireland, and Iceland. In the US, the album spent its first two weeks on the Billboard 200 at the top spot, staying in the top 10 for seven weeks. In its first week on sale, Zooropa sold 377,000 copies in the US, the group's best debut in the country to that point. The album reached the top 10 in 26 countries.

Despite reaching impressive peak positions, Zooropa had a shorter stay on the music charts than Achtung Baby did. In total, Zooropa spent 40 weeks on the Billboard 200, 61 fewer weeks than Achtung Baby. Zooropa spent 34 weeks on the UK Albums Chart, nine of which were in the top ten, but it charted in the UK for 59 fewer weeks than Achtung Baby.

According to Nielsen Soundscan, Zooropa sold 1.8 million copies in the US in 1993, the 22nd-highest total in the country that year, and by February 1997 sales in the US had reached 2.1 million copies. The album is certified 2× platinum in the US, 3× platinum in Australia, platinum in the UK, and 4× platinum in both New Zealand and Canada. It has sold more than 7 million copies.

== Zoo TV Tour ==
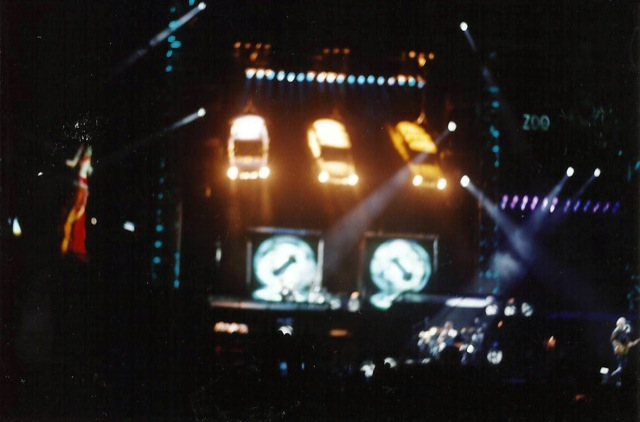
The band finished the album during the Zooropa leg of the Zoo TV Tour, and began playing the new songs later on the tour.

The band began the Zoo TV Tour in February 1992 in support of Achtung Baby. In contrast to the austere stage setups of previous U2 tours, Zoo TV was an elaborate multimedia event. It satirised television and the viewing public's overstimulation by attempting to instill "sensory overload" in its audience. The stage featured large video screens that showed visual effects, random video clips from pop culture, and flashing text phrases. Live satellite link-ups, channel surfing, crank calls, and video confessionals were incorporated into the shows.

The Zooropa album was released in July 1993, halfway through the Zooropa leg of the tour. Of the 157 shows the band played during the Zoo TV Tour, approximately 30 of them were after the release of Zooropa. Many of the album's songs found permanent places in the shows' set lists. "Lemon" and "Daddy's Gonna Pay for Your Crashed Car" were performed with Bono in his MacPhisto persona, during encores of the Zoomerang Leg of the tour. "Dirty Day" was also played on this leg after the acoustic set. "Numb" was performed with the Edge playing guitar and on lead vocals, with Mullen performing backing vocals while drumming. "Zooropa" was played only three times and "Babyface" twice more at the same shows on the Zooropa leg, but they were cut out of the set list after the band were displeased with how they sounded live. "Stay (Faraway, So Close!)" was performed acoustically for the Zooropa and Zoomerang legs.

== Legacy ==
"The songs are not classics but they are more experimental and interesting than classic pop songs. This is something we don't necessarily care to do anymore. We don't go down the road with a piece of music just because it's unusual. That's not enough for us now. We want something that's potent and some of these songs are not particularly potent."

— The Edge

Although the record was a success, in the years following its release, the group have regarded it with mixed feelings and rarely play its material in live performances. Bono said, "I thought of Zooropa at the time as a work of genius. I really thought our pop discipline was matching our experimentation and this was our Sgt. Pepper. I was a little wrong about that. The truth is our pop disciplines were letting us down. We didn't create hits. We didn't quite deliver the songs. And what would Sgt. Pepper be without the pop songs?" The Edge said that he did not think the songs were "potent", further stating, "I never thought of Zooropa as anything more than an interlude... but a great one, as interludes go. By far our most interesting." Clayton said, "It's an odd record and a favourite of mine." In 2005, Bono claimed that the album's track "Stay (Faraway, So Close!)" is "perhaps the greatest U2 song".

Retrospective professional reviews
Review scores
Source	Rating
AllMusic	4/5 stars
Pitchfork	8.4/10

After the release of Zooropa, David Bowie praised the band, writing, "[U2] might be all shamrocks and deutsche marks to some, but I feel that they are one of the few rock bands even attempting to hint at a world which will continue past the next great wall—the year 2000." In 2023, Steven Hyden of Uproxx echoed Bowie's sentiments in a 30th anniversary retrospective on Zooropa: "U2 dared to imagine something that in the present moment seems to be of little common interest: the future... I mean the future as it stood in the '90s, when people looked beyond the 20th century and envisioned a radically different world emerging from a period of political and cultural uncertainty." Hyden felt that U2 had been guided by uncertainty for the record, calling it "artistically successful in that it set out to evoke an increasingly incoherent world by making anyone who heard it also feel incoherent". He believed that unlike other alternative rock albums from 1993, Zooropa was even more relevant in 2023 than when first released, and that it had not become dated: "And that's because the world U2 thought they were commenting on in 1993 was in reality just coming into existence, and it's the world we're living in now." He added, "Above all, Zooropa summons the modern desire to unplug from the grid and reconnect with something 'real' or 'authentic.'"

Edna Gundersen of USA Today said in 2002, "the alien territory of Achtung Baby and Zooropa cemented U2's relevance and enhanced its cachet as intrepid explorers". Neil McCormick wrote about Zooropa, "It feels like a minor work, and generally U2 don't do minor. But if you're not going to make the Big Statement, you're maybe going to come up with something that has the oxygen of pop music." In 1997, Ann Powers of Spin wrote, "Zooropa took U2 as far from the monastic mysticism of The Joshua Tree as they could go. It freed U2 from itself." In 2013, the magazine published an article by Rob Harvilla that called Zooropa the album that almost killed U2's career. Harvilla referred to the album as "a weird blip best understood as a portent of the burps that followed, a mega-band dipping a big toe into murky art-rock waters before belly-flopping completely with Pop and its subsequent crass, costly, cred-depleting tour misadventures." While lamenting the band's latter-career creative output, he added: "Mark this record, then, as a celebration of a time when U2 was still musically daring; give 'Lemon' credit at least for successfully trolling you. It is the maddening, befuddling, discomfiting, somewhat ill-advised, occasionally inspired sound of very famous, very difficult men trying on some ill-fitting clothes." In 2011, Rolling Stone ranked the record at number 61 on its list of "100 Best Albums of the Nineties".

== Track listing ==
All lyrics are written by Bono, except where noted; all music is composed by U2.

Zooropa track listing
No.	Title	Lyrics	Length
1.	"Zooropa"		6:31
2.	"Babyface"		4:01
3.	"Numb"	The Edge	4:20
4.	"Lemon"		6:58
5.	"Stay (Faraway, So Close!)"		4:58
6.	"Daddy's Gonna Pay for Your Crashed Car"		5:20
7.	"Some Days Are Better Than Others"		4:17
8.	"The First Time"		3:45
9.	"Dirty Day"	Bono and The Edge	5:24
10.	"The Wanderer" (starring Johnny Cash)		5:41
Total length:			51:15

2018 vinyl remaster bonus tracks
No.	Title	Lyrics	Remixed by	Length
11.	"Lemon" (The Perfecto Mix)		Paul Oakenfold, Steve Osborne	8:57
12.	"Numb" (Gimme Some More Dignity Mix)	The Edge	Rollo, Rob D	8:51
Total length:				69:03

Notes

- "Daddy's Gonna Pay for Your Crashed Car" takes the fanfare from the album Lenin's Favourite Songs. The song also contains a sample from the song "The City Sleeps" by MC 900 Ft. Jesus.
- After "The Wanderer" fades out at 4:41, a "hidden track", consisting of a ringing alarm used to alert disc jockeys of "dead air", starts at 5:13 and plays for 30 seconds.
- The 2018 vinyl reissue splits the original album's ten tracks over sides 1–3, with the bonus tracks appearing on side 4.

== Personnel ==
Adapted from the liner notes.

U2

- Bono – vocals, guitar
- The Edge – guitar, piano, synthesizers, vocals
- Adam Clayton – bass guitar
- Larry Mullen Jr. – drums, percussion, backing vocals

Additional musicians

- Brian Eno – synthesizers (track 1, 3, 4, 7, 9, 10), loops (track 7, 10), arcade sounds (track 3), backing vocals (track 4), strings (track 4), piano and harmonium (track 8)
- Des Broadbery – loops (tracks 2, 6, 7)
- Flood – loops (tracks 6, 10)
- Johnny Cash – lead vocals (track 10)

Production

- Flood – production (all tracks), mixing (track 1, 2, 4–6, 8, 10), engineering (track 1–7, 9, 10)
- Brian Eno – production (all tracks)
- The Edge – production (all tracks)
- Anne-Louise Kelly – album production manager
- Robbie Adams – engineering (all tracks), mixing (track 3, 7, 9, 10)
- Willie Mannion – engineering assistance (track 1–7, 9, 10), mixing assistance (track 1, 4, 8–10)
- Rob Kirwan – engineering assistance (track 1, 3, 4, 5, 7, 9), mixing assistance (track 2, 5–7)
- Mary McShane – mixing assistance (track 3)
- Suzanne Doyle – studio production manager
- Arnie Acosta – mastering
- Stewart Whitmore – digital editing
- Cheryl Engels – post production coordinator
- Terry Cromer – additional recording facilities (Audio Engineering)
- Julian Douglas – additional recording facilities (Audio Engineering)
- Steve Averill – art direction
- Brian Williams – design, computer treatments
- Shaughn McGrath – baby illustration

== Charts ==
Album charts (weekly)
Chart (1993)	Peak position
Australian Albums (ARIA)	1
Austrian Albums (Ö3 Austria)	1
Canada Top Albums/CDs (RPM)	1
Dutch Albums (Album Top 100)	1
French Albums (SNEP)	1
German Albums (Offizielle Top 100)	1
Hungarian Albums (MAHASZ)	7
Japanese Albums (Oricon)	5
New Zealand Albums (RMNZ)	1
Norwegian Albums (VG-lista)	3
Spanish Albums (AFYPE)	2
Swedish Albums (Sverigetopplistan)	1
Swiss Albums (Schweizer Hitparade)	1
UK Albums (Official Charts)	1
US Billboard 200	1

Chart (2025)	Peak position
Greek Albums (IFPI)	78

Album charts (end of year)
Chart (1993)	Position
Australian Albums (ARIA)	9
Austrian Albums (Ö3 Austria)	9
Canadian Albums (RPM)	8
Dutch Albums (Album Top 100)	24
European Hot 100 Albums (Music & Media)	8
German Albums (Offizielle Top 100)	32
New Zealand Albums (RMNZ)	8
Spanish Albums (AFYVE)	24
Swiss Albums (Schweizer Hitparade)	36
UK Albums (OCC)	9
US Billboard 200	29

Chart (1994)	Position
Australian Albums (ARIA)	28
New Zealand Albums (RMNZ)	27

Song charts
Year	Title	Chart peak positions							Certifications
Year	Title	IRE	AUS	CAN	NZ	UK	US Mod Rock	US Hot 100	Certifications
1993	"Numb"	–	7	9	13	–	2	–	
1993	"Lemon"	–	6	20	4	–	3	–	
1993	"Zooropa"	–	–	–	–	–	13	–	
1993	"Stay (Faraway, So Close!)"	1	5	–	6	4	15	–	UK: Silver
1994	"Stay (Faraway, So Close!)"	–	–	14	–	–	–	61	UK: Silver
"–" denotes a release that did not chart.

== Certifications and sales ==
Album certifications
Region	Certification	Certified units/sales
Argentina (CAPIF)	Platinum	60,000^{^}
Australia (ARIA)	3× Platinum	210,000^{^}
Austria (IFPI Austria)	Gold	25,000^{*}
Brazil (Pro-Música Brasil)	Gold	100,000^{*}
Canada (Music Canada)	4× Platinum	400,000^{^}
France (SNEP)	Platinum	300,000^{*}
Germany (BVMI)	Gold	250,000^{^}
Japan (RIAJ)	Gold	100,000^{^}
New Zealand (RMNZ)	4× Platinum	60,000^{^}
Norway (IFPI Norway)	Gold	25,000^{*}
Spain (Promusicae)	Platinum	100,000^{^}
Sweden (GLF)	Gold	50,000^{^}
United Kingdom (BPI)	Platinum	300,000^{^}
United States (RIAA)	2× Platinum	2,000,000^{^}
Summaries
Worldwide	—	7,000,000
^{*} Sales figures based on certification alone.^{^} Shipments figures based on certification alone.
