= Lemon (U2 song) =

1993 single by U2

Single by U2

from the album Zooropa
- Released: 8 November 1993
- Recorded: March–May 1993
- Genre: Disco; alternative rock; funk; pop soul
- Length: 6:58 (album version); 4:39 (edit)
- Label: Island
- Composer: U2
- Lyricist: Bono
- Producers: Flood; Brian Eno; The Edge

U2 singles chronology
"Numb" (1993)	"Lemon" (1993)	"Stay (Faraway, So Close!)" (1993)

Music video
- "Lemon" on YouTube

"Lemon" is a song by Irish rock band U2. It is the fourth track on their eighth album, Zooropa (1993), and was released as its second single on 8 November 1993 by Island Records. Inspired by old video footage of lead vocalist Bono's late mother, the lyrics describe an attempt to preserve memory through film. More than any previous U2 song, "Lemon" showcases Bono's falsetto vocal range, aided by atmospheric backing vocals from the Edge and Brian Eno. Mark Neale directed the accompanying music video. At almost seven minutes, it is among the band's longest songs.

The single and promo releases were complete with different dance remixes, as well as a shortened edit of the title track. The "Perfecto Mix" by Paul Oakenfold and Steve Osborne was used on the PopMart Tour, being played as the band walked out of their Spinal Tap-like rock prop, a 40-foot mirrorball lemon, onto the B-stage for an encore, and was later reworked into "Skin on Skin" by Oakenfold's band Grace.

== Recording and composition ==
"Lemon" was written late during the Zooropa sessions between March–May 1993 during the band's break in the Zoo TV Tour. Guitarist the Edge said the song originated from something he "worked up with a drum machine and bass, very rhythmic." He explained that he found it difficult to compose a guitar part to the song until he utilized an "unusual gated guitar effect which worked with the rhythm."

Lead vocalist Bono wrote the lyrics with his late mother in mind. He explains that it was a "strange experience to receive, in the post, from a very distant relative, early Super 8 footage of my mother, aged 24, younger than me, playing a game of rounders in slow motion." The footage showed Bono's mother at a wedding as the maid of honour, wearing a lemon-coloured dress. The film footage inspired Bono to write lyrics about using film to recreate and preserve memory.

== Critical reception ==
Stephen Thomas Erlewine from AllMusic named the song a wonderful moment from the album, describing it as "space-age German disco". Larry Flick from Billboard magazine wrote, "Jittery, danceable moment from the yummy Zooropa collection is yet another step away from standard U2 fare. This time, Bono dabbles in sunny pop/soul, wrapping a luscious falsetto around an infectious hook and funk-fortified rhythm base. In its original form, track will be a joy for top 40 programmers. Inspired remixes by Robbie Adams and David Morales will open doors at crossover radio and in clubs." Troy J. Augusto from Cash Box named "Lemon" Pick of the Week, stating that here, the band "continues to push the envelope, adding yet another style twist to its catalog." He added, "Bouncy and quite danceable cut, which follows the desensitizing 'Numb' single, starts with a funky groove and augments with powerful and fun vocals from Bono and one of the strongest hooks the band has unleashed in quite some time." Peter Paphides from Melody Maker wrote, "Similar in sentiment to 'Mysterious Ways', yet as otherwordly as U2 have ever dared to be, 'Lemon' sounds like it was recorded in a padded cell, saturating the senses like some abstract European road movie. When Bono sings, "Midnight is where the day begins", over a harsh electronic funk groove, you're struck by images of a semi-mythical Europe, of speeding past neon-lit landscapes on deserted Autobahns."

Alan Jones from Music Week noted that it finds the singer "adopting a Jagger-like falsetto over a bouncy but sparse track that could lend itself to a dance remix." Stephen Dalton from NME felt Bono's falsetto croon on the "sleek disco cruiser" slips "from Bowie parody into understated New Order melancholy." Parry Gettelman from Orlando Sentinel viewed it as a "fast number" and "strictly for the polite Eurodisco crowd." David Cavanagh from Select wrote, "No way is this U2. It could be the Tom Tom Club, with 'Miss You'-era Mick Jagger slurping his way over the top. It could be a fab outtake from Talking Heads' journey into Africa Remain in Light. (Eno co-produced that as well, of course.) Either way, it's sinewy and vibrant and the groove is remarkable." Max Bell of Vox described "Lemon" as "two songs rolled into one; a dub and a Lovers' Rock then a cool Eno-style reflection on Nietzschean overachievement — where 'a man melts the sand so he can see the world outside' recalling the producer's work with Talking Heads (circa Fear of Music and Remain in Light)."

== Music video ==
The music video for "Lemon", directed by British documentarian and film director Mark Neale, was filmed in black and white with a grid-like background as a tribute to Eadweard Muybridge. Muybridge was a photographer who was the first person to successfully capture fast motion on film, using his device, coincidentally named the Zoopraxiscope, a reference to the lyrics ("A man makes a picture – a moving picture/Through light projected he can see himself up close"). The video primarily features a sequence of clips of the band members playing their instruments and performing a series of distinct actions, with captions for each one (e.g. "man walking up incline", "man running", "man playing pool"). A series of color images appear behind the grid, such as a swinging pendulum, falling dollar bills, a ticking clock, satellite video imagery, and a cross. All of these symbols seem to be representing man's attempt to preserve time, via money ("He turns his money into light to look for her"), religion, or technology. At different times, Bono adopts the "Fly" and "MacPhisto" personas he used during the Zoo TV Tour.

== Live performances ==
The song was played live at 10 different Zoo TV Tour shows in Australia, New Zealand, and Japan, during the show's encore. During each performance, Bono would perform the song dressed as Zoo TV character "MacPhisto," a former cabaret performer with devilish horns. Each performance was immediately followed by the band's "With or Without You". As with most of Zooropa’s material, "Lemon" has never been performed live by U2 since the close of the Zoo TV tour.

== Track listing ==
- CD and cassette single
1. "Lemon" (edit) – 4:42
2. "Lemon" (Oakenfold Jeep mix) – 5:32
3. "Lemon" (album version) – 6:58
4. "Lemon" (Morales BYC version dub) – 6:36

== Remixes ==
David Morales mixes

- "Lemon" (Bad Yard club mix) – 10:16 / 8:47*
- "Lemon" (Bad Yard club edit) – 5:20
- "Lemon" (Version dub) – 6:46*
- "Lemon" (Serious Def dub) – 6:42
- "Lemon" (Momo's Reprise) – 4:08
- "Lemon" (Momo Beats) – 4:34

Paul Oakenfold & Steve Osborne mixes

- "Lemon" (Perfecto mix) – 8:57
- "Lemon" (Trance mix) – 8:57
- "Lemon" (Jeep mix) – 5:30

Flood & Robbie Adams mixes

- "Lemon" (Lemonade mix) – 6:40
- "Lemon" (Lemonade mix edit) – 4:15

Note: The "Bad Yard Club Mix" has differing durations depending on the release. The original version is over 10 minutes long, and an edited version that fades out around the eight-minute mark exists on some releases. Additionally, the "Version Dub" remix is titled differently on certain releases, such as "BYC Version Dub" or "Morales BYC Version Dub", but these are all the same.

== Charts ==
=== Weekly charts ===
Chart (1993–1994)	Peak position
Australia (ARIA)	6
Belgium (Ultratop 50 Flanders)	39
Canada Top Singles (RPM)	20
Canada Dance/Urban (RPM)	3
Europe (Eurochart Hot 100)	73
Europe (European Hit Radio)	14
Iceland (Íslenski Listinn Topp 40)	1
Israel (Israeli Singles Chart)	8
Italy (Musica e dischi)	24
New Zealand (Recorded Music NZ)	4
UK Airplay (Music Week)	35
UK Dance (Music Week)	40
UK Club Chart (Music Week)	1
US Bubbling Under Hot 100 (Billboard)	3
US Alternative Airplay (Billboard)	3
US Dance Club Songs (Billboard)	1
US Dance Singles Sales (Billboard)	16

=== Year-end charts ===
Chart (1993)	Position
Australia (ARIA)	53
Iceland (Íslenski Listinn Topp 40)	8
UK Club Chart (Music Week)	5

== Certifications ==
Region	Certification	Certified units/sales
Australia (ARIA)	Gold	35,000^{^}
New Zealand (RMNZ)	Platinum	10,000^{*}
^{*} Sales figures based on certification alone.^{^} Shipments figures based on certification alone.
