= Stay (Faraway, So Close!) =

1993 single by U2

Single by U2

from the album Zooropa
- B-side: "I've Got You Under My Skin" (Frank Sinatra w/Bono)
- Released: 22 November 1993
- Genre: Alternative rock
- Length: 4:58
- Label: Island
- Composer: U2
- Lyricist: Bono
- Producers: Flood; Brian Eno; The Edge

U2 singles chronology
"Lemon" (1993)	"Stay (Faraway, So Close!)" (1993)	"Hold Me, Thrill Me, Kiss Me, Kill Me" (1995)

Music video
- "Stay (Faraway, So Close!)" on YouTube

"Stay (Faraway, So Close!)" is a song by Irish rock band U2. It is the fifth track on their eighth album, Zooropa (1993), and it was released as the album's third single on 22 November 1993 by Island Records. The song reached number one on the Irish Singles Chart and reached the top 10 in Australia, Iceland, in the UK Singles Chart, and several other countries. The accompanying music video, directed by Wim Wenders, was shot in Berlin, Germany. The earliest incarnation of the song developed during sessions for the group's 1991 album Achtung Baby. It was written for and inspired by Frank Sinatra and bore his surname as the original working title. An alternative recording was used in the 1993 film Faraway, So Close!, also by Wim Wenders.

"Stay (Faraway, So Close!)" was well received by critics and nominated for a Golden Globe for Best Original Song at the 51st Golden Globe Awards. The song made its live debut on the Zoo TV Tour but has only been performed intermittently in an acoustic version over subsequent tours. Members of U2 consider it to be one of their favourite songs; guitarist The Edge named it the best track on the album, while lead singer Bono stated that it was one of their best creations.

== Writing and inspiration ==
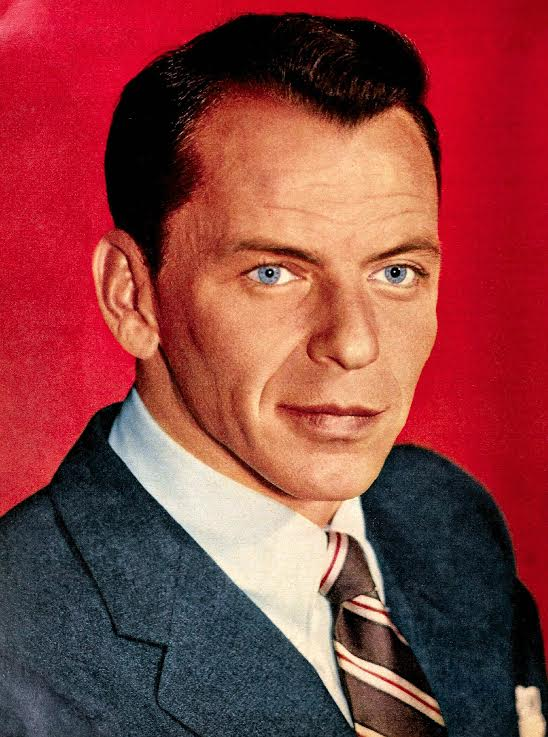
"Stay (Faraway, So Close!)" was inspired by the music of Frank Sinatra

The earliest incarnation of "Stay (Faraway, So Close!)" was developed during the recording sessions for the 1991 album Achtung Baby. While working in Hansa Ton Studios in Berlin, lead singer Bono and guitarist the Edge created the verse. The track was given the working title "Sinatra" in reference to Frank Sinatra, the artist whose music inspired it. The group reworked it in preparation of the 1993 album Zooropa. The Edge noted "it came to us in installments". Bassist Adam Clayton said "it was hard to figure out how we would do it. I mean, no one is going to mistake us for Frank Sinatra's backing band. A very humble little combo sound is what we ended up with and that really worked." The Edge added "I was playing around on piano with some old-school chord progressions trying to summon up the spirit of Frank Sinatra. It's definitely not from a rock and roll tradition." He worked out a chord progression based on old Tin Pan Alley songs.

"Bono used to say it was for Frank Sinatra but we needed songs for Zooropa so we thought we would have a go."

— Adam Clayton

As the recording sessions progressed, Wim Wenders approached the band and asked them for a song for his next film, Faraway, So Close!. The Edge said "we heard Wim Wenders was looking for a song... so I had a go at finishing it." U2 watched the film, Faraway, So Close!, for inspiration on how to craft the song. Bono said "the film was about angels who want to be human and who want to be on Earth. But to do so they have to become mortal. That was a great image to play with - the impossibility of wanting something like this, and then the cost of having it." Two versions of the song were crafted; the first was released on Zooropa, and the second, almost two minutes longer and featuring "an edgier guitar and drum performance", was included on the Faraway, So Close! soundtrack. Close to the completion of the recording Bono renamed the song "Stay". Wanting to further reference the Wenders film he then changed it once more, to "Stay (Faraway, So Close!)".

== Composition and theme ==
"Stay (Faraway, So Close!)" runs for 4 minutes and 58 seconds. According to Universal Music Publishing Group's sheet music published at Musicnotes.com, it is played in common time at a tempo of 86 beats per minute in the key of E♭ major. The vocals extend from a low note of Bb_{2} to a high of Bb_{4}, which is one of the highest notes Bono has ever recorded on studio.

"The action happens in a curious dreamscape in which nothing seems certain except uncertainty itself."

— Niall Stokes

Third Way contributor Graham Cray wrote that the song "[describes] more directly a culture which consists of a cacophony of voices and images but which has neither soul nor direction." Hot Press editor Niall Stokes noted that the lyrics were ambiguous in whether they took place in reality or fantasy, which he likened to the overarching theme of the album. Author David Kootnikoff believed that "the pop melody conceals the lyric's dark theme about a victim of physical abuse who reasons her pain away with the line 'When he hurts you, you feel alive.'" Mark Brown of the Orange County Register described it as "the desperate tale of an abused woman with nowhere to go but back to her home." He compared it to U2's 1987 song "Running to Stand Still", saying "That same sort of descriptive but distanced narrative is what made [it] so powerful."

== Release ==
"Stay (Faraway, So Close!)" was released internationally as the third single from Zooropa on 22 November 1993, following the releases of "Numb" and "Lemon" earlier in the year. It was available in 7-inch vinyl, cassette, and CD formats in four versions. Various promotional singles were also released to industry figures, including a 12-inch vinyl version. All formats included a cover of "I've Got You Under My Skin". "Stay (Faraway, So Close!)" was included on U2's 2002 compilation album The Best of 1990–2000, and its accompanying video release. The alternate recording of the song was released on the soundtrack to Faraway, So Close!. Craig Armstrong covered it on his 2002 album As If to Nothing; Bono recorded a new vocal take for the track. The song also features in the 1993 Only Fools and Horses episode "Fatal Extraction".

=== B-sides ===
Six B-sides were included across the four versions. "I've Got You Under My Skin" was the sole B-side on the 7-inch and cassette formats. It was also available on the version dubbed "The Swing Format", which contained two remixes of "Lemon". "I've Got You Under My Skin" is a cover of the 1936 Cole Porter song, recorded as a duet by Bono and Frank Sinatra. It was also released on Sinatra's 1993 album Duets. "Lemon (Perfecto Mix)" was remixed by Paul Oakenfold and Steve Osborne. "Lemon (Bad Yard Club Edit)" was mixed by David Morales, who added his own percussion to the track.

"The Live Format" included the first studio release of "Slow Dancing" and live versions of "Bullet the Blue Sky" and "Love Is Blindness" from the Zoo TV Tour. "Slow Dancing" is an acoustic song by Bono and was written for Willie Nelson. It debuted in concert on 1 December 1989 in Osaka, Japan, on the Lovetown Tour, almost four years before it was released, and has been performed infrequently since then. While recording elements of "Stay (Faraway, So Close!)", Bono picked up a guitar and began to play the song. When finished he asked producer Flood if he wanted to record it; unbeknownst to him, the microphone was on and the take had been recorded. A second take was then done. It was considered for inclusion on Zooropa; although producer Brian Eno liked it, the song was not selected for the album. A second version, recorded with Nelson, was later released as a B-side on U2's 1997 single "If God Will Send His Angels". "Bullet the Blue Sky" was recorded on 28 August 1993 in Dublin. "Love Is Blindness" was taken from U2's concert on 30 August 1992 in New York City.

=== Music video ===
"I love the interplay between Bono and Meret. It's very hard for Meret to pretend to be singing all alone, and Bono really teased her... he tried to distract her but she just continued singing as if he wasn't there."

— Wim Wenders

The music video for "Stay (Faraway, So Close!)" was directed by German filmmaker Wim Wenders, produced by Debbie Mason, and edited by Jerry Chater. The video was filmed in Berlin over the course of three days, primarily in black-and-white but with some sequences in colour. It contains cameos of some of the actors who appeared in Faraway, So Close!, including Otto Sander, as well as Wenders's nephew. Several scenes are taken directly from Faraway, So Close! and Wenders's 1987 film Wings of Desire, which also served as the principal inspiration for the video's premise. Wenders noted that "making a video is really a very different ballgame. You have the script, so to speak, because you have the song, and everything you do is in order to help the song shine... You want to make that song look as good as possible and sound as good as possible and as interesting as possible." Several shots depict the band members standing on the statue of Victoria, a monument at the top of the Berlin Victory Column; a model of the angel was created for those scenes. Leftover military equipment from the Cold War, including the Soviet MiG, were included in the background.

The video depicts a band playing "Stay (Faraway, So Close!)". U2 were cast in the role of the band's guardian angels, watching over the position that corresponds to their instrument in U2. Meret Becker is the lead actress of the video, cast as the band's lead singer. Wenders stated that they "liked the idea that Bono's voice would be sung by a girl in this video." Throughout the video U2 help the musicians play the track; drummer Larry Mullen Jr. is shown assisting in the beat, while The Edge tunes the guitar, which Wenders noted is "what you'd do if you were guardian angel to a lead guitarist." The video alternates between the band playing, the members of U2 standing on Victoria, and scenes from both Wenders films. At the conclusion of the video, Bono leaves the band on their own. The final shot shows him falling to earth, personifying the final lyric "Just the bang and the clatter as an angel hits the ground."

== Live performances ==
"Stay (Faraway, So Close!)" debuted on 31 July 1993 in Stockholm, Sweden, on the fourth leg of the Zoo TV Tour. It was performed at all remaining concerts on the tour. It was not played on the 1997-1998 PopMart Tour. "Stay (Faraway, So Close!)" returned to the live setting on 20 April 2001 in San Jose, California, on the first leg of the Elevation Tour, making it the first song from Zooropa to be played in North America. It was performed as an acoustic duet by Bono and The Edge. The rendition was impromptu and not on the set list, with Bono reading the lyrics from a sheet. The song continued to be performed sporadically through the rest of the tour, appearing at 48 of 113 concerts. One particular concert of note during the Elevation tour, was the band's performance at The Palais in Paris on July 17, 2001. Bono announced from the stage "Wim Wenders in the house!" He then dedicated the song to Wim and his wife Donata, both in attendance. It was an acoustic version with just Bono and Edge performing. "Stay (Faraway, So Close!)" was not played during the 2005-2006 Vertigo Tour, but U2 revived it on the 2009-2011 U2 360° Tour. It was played sporadically on the first and second leg of the tour, and was a mainstay feature of the fifth leg. It was the only song from Zooropa performed by U2 at the Glastonbury Festival 2011. After being absent from the setlists for the entirety of the 2015 Innocence + Experience and The Joshua Tree 2017 tours, it returned for the last 20 concerts of the 2018 Experience + Innocence Tour, when it was performed by the full band and electrically for the first time since the Zoo TV Tour. Bono introduced the song by speaking about how divided the band was in Berlin at the start of the 1990s and how music helped them reconnect.

Live performances of the song appear on Zoo TV: Live from Sydney (1994), Elevation 2001: Live from Boston (2001), the "Walk On" and "Stuck in a Moment You Can't Get Out Of" singles (2001), Zoo TV Live (2006), and the live album U22 (2012). The Zoo TV Live performance is an audio rip of the performance from Zoo TV: Live from Sydney. The version on the "Walk On" and "Stuck in a Moment You Can't Get Out Of" singles was recorded in Toronto on 25 May 2001.

== Reception ==
"Stay (Faraway, So Close!)" was critically acclaimed. Music journalist Sam Richards rated the song four stars out of five, calling it "a twinkling '90s alt. rock ballad - a cousin of Radiohead's "High and Dry" and Smashing Pumpkins' "1979" - that just about manages to keep a lid on its impulse to seek out the nearest clifftop." Hot Press editor Niall Stokes said "the performance is full of languorous beauty, a gentle understated kind of emotion that seems at odds with the disorientation in the lyrics." Billboard contributor Fred Bronson joked that it was an example of how songs named "Stay" reach the Billboard Hot 100, following similarly named hits by Lisa Loeb & Nine Stories ("Stay (I Missed You)"), The Four Seasons ("Stay"), Shakespears Sister ("Stay"), Jodeci ("Stay") and Eternal ("Stay"). Robert Levine of Spin called it one of their best songs, saying "They're still obsessed with transcendence, whether it's the kind you find on a Joshua Tree bluff or a "Miami" dance floor. And ["Stay (Faraway, So Close!)"] framed that search in the most intimate of terms, even when they were too jaded to crawl out from under their "lemon" and look us in the eye."

Writing for Time, Josh Tyrangiel compared it to U2's earlier hits "Where the Streets Have No Name" and "One", saying "'Stay (Faraway, So Close!)'... [achieves] the impossible — becoming meaningful to millions of people — precisely because [it is] beautifully vague." David Bauder of the Associated Press called it "the album's most beautiful song." Peter Howell of the Toronto Star said that it was "the most conventional U2 song on the album." The Orange County Register's Mark Brown noted "The casual guitar lines on 'Stay' infuse the song with a tension that perfectly suits the subject". The Bergen Record reviewer Barbara Jaeger called it an "achingly beautiful ballad". Writing for The Dallas Morning News, Manuel Mendoza said it was "absolutely gorgeous, with Bono's husky moaning evoking a warm yearning". Alan Jones from Music Week stated that "slow-burning, intense and not overtly commercial, this is not a natural for the chart". David Cavanagh from Select named it "another Bowie-esque song of alienation and boredom." He added, "The narrator appears to have given up all human contact in exchange for TV. With satellite television you can go anywhere, sings Bono with great sadness as the song wells up from a tentative Velvets-type guitar figure into a big lonely forlorn ballad. It could be set in any city in the world."

"Stay (Faraway, So Close!)" was nominated in the category Best Original Song at the 51st Golden Globe Awards. In 2005, Bono said "Stay (Faraway, So Close!)" was "perhaps the greatest U2 song", saying it has the "most extraordinary contour of a melody. It's really quite sophisticated. The lyric never misses," and noting that they had "never turned 'Stay' into the single it deserved to be." He named it as one of his two favourite U2 songs, along with "Please". The Edge called it "the stand-out track on the record". Wenders described it as one of his favourite U2 songs.

== Formats and track listings ==
All tracks are written by U2 and performed by U2 except "I've Got You Under My Skin", written by Cole Porter and performed by Frank Sinatra with Bono.

7-inch, cassette, CD 1
No.	Title	Length
1.	"Stay (Faraway, So Close!)"	4:58
2.	"I've Got You Under My Skin"	3:32
Total length:		8:30

CD 2 (The Swing Format)
No.	Title	Length
1.	"Stay (Faraway, So Close!)"	4:58
2.	"I've Got You Under My Skin"	3:32
3.	"Lemon" (Bad Yard Club edit)	5:19
4.	"Lemon" (Perfecto mix)	8:57
Total length:		22:46

CD 3 (The Live Format)
No.	Title	Length
1.	"Stay (Faraway, So Close!)"	4:58
2.	"Slow Dancing"	3:20
3.	"Bullet the Blue Sky" (Live)	5:32
4.	"Love Is Blindness" (Live)	5:58
Total length:		19:48

CD 4
No.	Title	Length
1.	"Stay (Faraway, So Close!)"	4:58
2.	"I've Got You Under My Skin"	3:32
3.	"Slow Dancing"	3:20
4.	"Bullet the Blue Sky" (Live)	5:32
5.	"Love Is Blindness" (Live)	5:58
6.	"Lemon" (Bad Yard club edit)	5:19
Total length:		25:07

== Credits and personnel ==
U2

- Bono – vocals, guitar
- The Edge – guitar, backing vocals
- Adam Clayton – bass guitar
- Larry Mullen Jr. – drums, percussion

Technical

- Production – Flood
- Production assistance – Rob Kirwan
- Engineering – Flood and Robbie Adams
- Engineering assistance – Willie Mannion and Rob Kirwan

== Charts ==
=== Weekly charts ===
Weekly chart performance for "Stay (Faraway, So Close!)"
Chart (1993–1994)	Peak position
Australia (ARIA)	5
Austria (Ö3 Austria Top 40)	22
Belgium (Ultratop 50 Flanders)	13
Canada Retail Singles (The Record)	5
Canada Top Singles (RPM)	14
Denmark (IFPI)	6
Europe (Eurochart Hot 100)	10
Europe (European Hit Radio)	9
Finland (Suomen virallinen lista)	5
France (SNEP)	18
Germany (GfK)	88
Iceland (Íslenski Listinn Topp 40)	3
Ireland (IRMA)	1
Italy (Musica e dischi)	3
Netherlands (Dutch Top 40)	10
Netherlands (Single Top 100)	10
New Zealand (Recorded Music NZ)	6
Spain (AFYVE)	15
Sweden (Sverigetopplistan)	13
Switzerland (Schweizer Hitparade)	20
UK Singles (Official Charts)	4
UK Airplay (Music Week)	7
US Billboard Hot 100	61
US Alternative Airplay (Billboard)	15
US Mainstream Rock (Billboard)	12

=== Year-end charts ===
1993 year-end chart performance for "Stay (Faraway, So Close!)"
Chart (1993)	Position
Iceland (Íslenski Listinn Topp 40)	39
Sweden (Topplistan)	93
UK Singles (OCC)	83

1994 year-end chart performance for "Stay (Faraway, So Close!)"
Chart (1994)	Position
Belgium (Ultratop)	93
Europe (Eurochart Hot 100)	75

== Sales and certifications ==
Certifications and sales for "Stay (Faraway, So Close!)"
Region	Certification	Certified units/sales
United Kingdom (BPI)	Silver	200,000^{^}
^{^} Shipments figures based on certification alone.

== Release history ==
Release dates and formats for "Stay (Faraway, So Close!)"
Region	Date	Format(s)	Label(s)	Ref.
United Kingdom	22 November 1993	7-inch vinyl; CD1; cassette	Island	
United Kingdom	29 November 1993	CD2	Island	
Japan	20 December 1993	CD	Island	
Australia	31 January 1994	7-inch vinyl; CD	Island	

== See also ==
- List of covers of U2 songs – Stay (Faraway, So Close!)
