= Love Is Blindness =

Song by U2

from the album Achtung Baby
- Released: 18 November 1991
- Recorded: October 1990 – September 1991
- Studio: Hansa Ton Studios (Berlin); Elsinore (Dublin); Windmill Lane Studios (Dublin)
- Genre: Alternative rock
- Length: 4:23
- Label: Island
- Composer: U2
- Lyricist: Bono
- Producer: Daniel Lanois

Audio sample
- "Love Is Blindness": file; help

"Love Is Blindness" is a song by the Irish rock band U2, and the twelfth and final track on their 1991 album Achtung Baby. The song was written on piano by lead singer Bono during the recording sessions for U2's 1988 album Rattle and Hum. Originally intending to give the song to singer Nina Simone, the band decided to keep it for Achtung Baby after playing it together. Thematically, the song describes a failing romance, mixing personal themes with imagery of metaphorical acts of terrorism. During the recording sessions for Achtung Baby, guitarist the Edge separated from his wife, Aislinn O'Sullivan. The separation had a major effect on the development of the song; Bono said that the ending guitar solo was a cathartic experience for the Edge, as he snapped several guitar strings during the recording.

"Love Is Blindness" made its live debut on the group's 1992–1993 Zoo TV Tour and was performed regularly during the tour, appearing in 154 of its 157 concerts. It was commonly played as either the penultimate or closing song; as the penultimate song, it was usually followed by a rendition of the Elvis Presley song "Can't Help Falling in Love". The track was favourably received by critics and has been covered by multiple artists.

== Writing, recording, and inspiration ==
"I was pushing him and pushing him and pushing him, and he played until the strings fell off. Actually, you'll hear strings snapping during the solo towards the end. He was, I think, in tears on the inside, and the outside was just raging."

—Bono on the Edge's solo

"Love Is Blindness" was developed by lead singer Bono during the recording sessions for U2's 1988 album Rattle and Hum. He wrote the song on a piano, which guitarist the Edge said is "not an instrument he is noted for playing." The torch songs of Jacques Brel influenced Bono's songwriting. His initial plan was to send it to Nina Simone, one of his favourite singers, although after playing the song together, the band decided to keep it for themselves. They did not include the song on Rattle and Hum because they believed it was not "U2 enough".

During the recording sessions for Achtung Baby, the Edge separated from his wife, Aislinn O'Sullivan. Reflecting on the impact it had on U2, Bono said, "We're a really tight community. This is not like somebody's, you know, girlfriend's left. We've grown up with these people, this our family, our community. This was really hard for us... It was like the first cracks on the beautiful porcelain jug with those beautiful flowers in it that was our music and our community, starting to go 'crack'." The Edge explained that travelling to Berlin to write and record provided him with an escape from his failing marriage: "I was disappearing into the music for a different reason. It was a refuge in a way. That approach didn't completely work. You know, I wasn't really... in a good positive headspace. I was running away, I suppose." While recording the guitar solo that concludes the song, the Edge "put everything into it, all the feeling, all the hurt, all the angst, everything went into that solo." Bono said, "his whole life came out of him when he played... when we went for the take, one string broke and he just kept playing harder and harder. Another string broke. And he has such a light touch, ordinarily, he's so gentle. All that left him for a kind of rage. And yet there's not one bum note in there." Audio engineer Flood said the "bold, unadulterated, naked [guitar solo] sound was a combination of the part, the moment, a good guitar, a small amp, a simple mic. Edge just got an idea, tried it, and it worked straightaway."

== Composition and theme ==
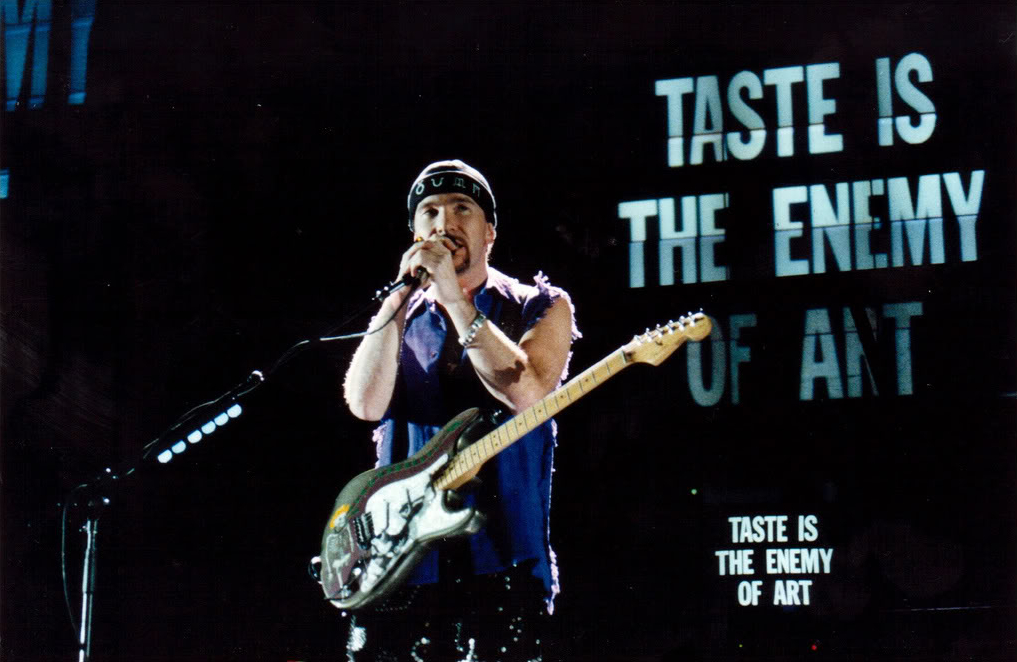
The Edge (pictured in 1993) separated from his wife during the recording of Achtung Baby. He channeled his painful emotions from that time into his guitar playing on the song.

"Love Is Blindness" runs for four minutes, 23 seconds. According to Hal Leonard Corporation's sheet music published at Musicnotes.com, it is played in a 6/4 time signature at a tempo of 48 beats per minute in a key of B-flat minor.

The production team gave bassist Adam Clayton's bass a "low end bass throbbing effect", which the Edge described as "a real stroke of genius from the production team." Drummer Larry Mullen, Jr.'s drum pattern was taken from U2's 1987 single "I Still Haven't Found What I'm Looking For" and slowed down. The lyrics "[mix] up the personal and the political." Bono noted that "There was some reference to the little death, which can be taken to mean a faint during orgasm but also works as an image of terrorism." Quoting the lyric "A little death without mourning / No call and no warning / Baby, a dangerous idea / That almost makes sense", he said, "There's nothing more deadly than an idea – or a person – that's almost right. You know, it took the 20th century a hundred years to get over communism. There's another dangerous idea that almost made sense."

"The song has images of terrorism, bomb-building, clockworks and cold steel, parked car. In a personal sense, I have observed the phenomenon of a person planting a kind of landmine that years later they will accidentally tread on and blow their lives to pieces. You can watch people doing it, wilfully getting involved in actions they will pay a very heavy price for later. Trajectory is everything."

—Bono

U2 biographer Bill Flanagan credits Bono's habit of keeping his lyrics "in flux until the last minute" with providing a narrative coherence to the album. Flanagan interpreted Achtung Baby as using the moon as a metaphor for a dark woman seducing the singer away from his virtuous love, the sun; he is tempted away from domestic life by an exciting nightlife and tests how far he can go before returning home. For Flanagan, the final three songs on Achtung Baby—"Ultraviolet (Light My Way)", "Acrobat", and "Love Is Blindness"—are about how the couple deal with the suffering they have forced on each other. Uncut contributor Gavin Martin believed the song contained "images of love, debased or abandoned." He wrote, "With its stark, churchlike organ intro, pulsating bass synth and guitar reverb stretched into a hallucinatory squall, it brilliantly describes the discord and dread that provide a constant undertow to Achtung Baby. And yet, through its alluring sonic palette and wounded but sensual vocal, 'Love Is Blindness' also maps out a search for harmony and salvation".

Author Atara Stein wrote that the song "suggests that love can operate only through a willful self-deception, a voluntary surrender to what one knows is an illusion. The singer begs his lover to 'wrap the night' around him because, as he proclaims, 'I don't want to see.' The singer knows that the image he creates of his loved one is false, but it is the only image that can satisfy him. He must perceive his beloved in idealized terms, so she can reflect back to him the image of himself that he desires to see." Journalist Bill Graham believed the song was a bleak account of a failing romance. Hot Press editor Niall Stokes wrote that the song "takes us back – again – to the shadowy world of deceit, infidelity, and betrayal. It depicts love at the end, the very end, of its tether. It is as bleak and as despairing a view of the world as you're likely to get, reflecting the emotional climate in which the entire album had been made." He noted, "In terms of its mood, 'Love Is Blindness' had the dark, sensual and decadent feel of pre-war Berlin", adding that the lyric "Love is blindness / I don't want to see" was "a desolate acknowledgement of the terrible reality that it is sometimes better not to know."

== Reception ==
"Love Is Blindness" was favourably received by critics. Uncut contributor Gavin Martin rated the song five stars, calling it "rapturous and unsettling." Hot Press editor Niall Stokes said, "its sentiments made it the perfect conclusion to Achtung Baby, describing the Edge's playing as "a mournful, ejaculatory guitar solo, stabbing out thick emotional blues notes that linger and then fall away like tears." Third Way reviewer Roland Howard described it as "haunting and melodic", believing it to be about the loss of virginity. Music journalist Bill Wyman said the Edge's guitar playing on the song sounded like a "dentist's drill". Jon Pareles of The New York Times described it as "a kind of summation", calling it "an elegy that compares love to 'drowning in a deep well' and wishes for it anyway." Geoffrey Himes of The Washington Post wrote that it has "a gospel quality, as swooning synth parts are set against block piano chords, and Bono acknowledges that mismatched lovers will suffer their inevitable fate."

Greg Potter of The Vancouver Sun believed it to be a "dour closer" that was "riddled with images of self-doubt and uncertainty". A critic for the Waterloo Region Record said it was "hardly great U2, but U2 closers have always been anti- climactic." Writing for the Boston Herald, Romandetta called it a "broken-hearted [lament]" that was "gentle" and "subdued". George Varga of The San Diego Union-Tribune said it was one of the most interesting tracks on the albums, calling it a "spare, David Bowie-like [ode] to tormented love". Michael Ross of The Sunday Times and James Healy of The San Diego Union-Tribune lamented that U2 did not include it on the compilation album The Best of 1990–2000. The Edge called it "a great end to the album and probably one of Bono's finest lyrics." Bono said, "The bass sounds like liquid at the centre of the earth, a kind of molten lava bass sound." Describing the Edge's guitar playing, he said, "It's incredible."

== Live performances ==
"Love Is Blindness" debuted on 29 February 1992 in Lakeland, Florida, on the opening night of the Zoo TV Tour, where it closed the concert. It remained in this position throughout the first and second leg of the tour, with only two concerts concluding with an alternate song – "With or Without You". "Love Is Blindness" was not performed on either of those two occasions. Beginning on the third leg of the tour it was followed by a cover of the Elvis Presley song "Can't Help Falling in Love" and, on one occasion, "Are You Lonesome Tonight?". The song was performed at 154 of 157 concerts on the tour, closing 67 of them. On multiple occasions Bono brought a girl from the audience on to the stage to dance with during the song.

U2 concert historian Pimm Jal de la Parra called the live rendition "sultry, as the screens show a constellation map, giving the crowd a feeling of floating across the universe by the way it moves, transmitting a mood of distance and loneliness that corresponds with the nature of the song." Mark Lepage of The Gazette described the dance at the conclusion as "an appropriate moment of human contact after almost two hours of uproar." Julie Romandetta of the Boston Herald believed it to be an anticlimactic finish to the concert, calling the song "low-key" and saying "U2 soared for more than 90 minutes, but left with a whimper, instead of a bang." Gary Graff of the Houston Chronicle believed it to be a "moody show-closer". Writing for The Arizona Daily Star, Gene Armstrong called it an "achingly romantic closing tune", describing the Edge's solo as "especially tender".

A live performance of the song appears on Zoo TV: Live from Sydney (1994), and Zoo TV Live (2006). The Zoo TV Live performance is an audio rip of the performance from Zoo TV: Live from Sydney. One performance, recorded on 30 August 1992 in New York City, was included as a B-side on some versions of U2's 1994 single "Stay (Faraway, So Close!)". A video for the song, directed by Matt Mahurin, was included on the 1994 VHS single "Numb". It featured the studio recording set to footage of the Zoo TV Tour. An acoustic performance by the Edge appears in the 2011 documentary From the Sky Down.

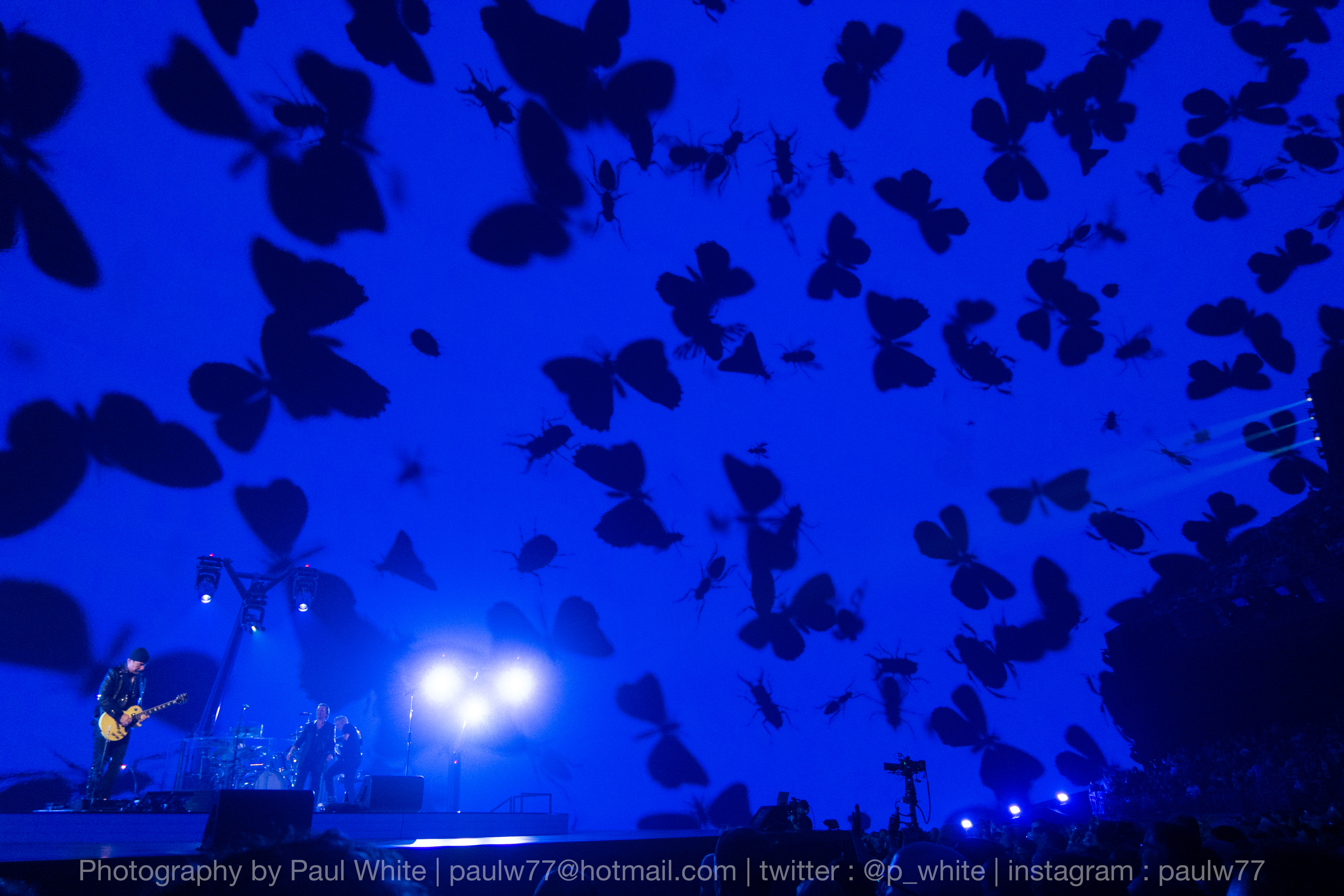
U2 performs the song at Sphere, on 29 September 2023, as insects appear to cover the screen.

Following the conclusion of the Zoo TV Tour, "Love Is Blindness" went on almost total hiatus from live concerts for many years, only being performed twice over nearly three decades. The first reappearance was on the Elevation Tour; while performing in Calgary, Alberta, on 10 April 2001, Bono sang a few lines from the song at the conclusion of "One". The second reappearance was during a Vertigo Tour concert in Buenos Aires, Argentina, on 1 March 2006, when U2 performed the song spontaneously to conclude the concert. The song made its live return during the band's 2023–2024 concert residency U2:UV Achtung Baby Live, which inaugurated the concert venue Sphere in the Las Vegas Valley. The song concluded the main set of the concerts, and during performances the venue LED's screen was mostly a solid blue hue before it began to fill up with the silhouettes of insects until it was nearly blacked out completely.

== Cover versions ==
"Love Is Blindness" has been covered several times. Cassandra Wilson included it on her 1995 album New Moon Daughter. Dutch band Kane recorded a version for their 2000 album With or Without You. Trespassers William covered it on the 2001 tribute album Even Better Than the Real Thing, and on their 2002 self-released album Different Stars. Sixpence None the Richer recorded a cover for the 2004 benefit album In the Name of Love: Artists United for Africa. The Devlins featuring Sharon Corr included a version on the 2005 tsunami relief album Even Better Than the Real Thing Vol. 3. Angolan musician Waldemar Bastos recorded a cover for the 2008 album In the Name of Love: Africa Celebrates U2.

A rendition by Jack White appears on the 2011 tribute album AHK-toong BAY-bi Covered, and as the B-side of his own single, "Sixteen Saltines". It was later released as a bonus track on the Japanese edition of White's Blunderbuss album. This cover is also featured on the album The Great Gatsby: Music from Baz Luhrmann's Film. In March 2015, video director DirectorBrazil and choreographer Zach Venegas released a music video using the Jack White rendition's audio track and starring 13-year-old American dancer Chloe Lukasiak (formerly of Dance Moms reality show), as well as brief appearances by other teenage dancers. The video was filmed in Nov. 2014 in Los Angeles and released as part of the Team Chloe Dance Project on Lukasiak's YouTube channel. In November 2024, the song was used as the theme song for the spy thriller TV series The Agency.

In 2013, Jacquie Lee covered the song on the fifth season of The Voice. Madi Davis subsequently covered it on the show's ninth season.

In 2016, the Canadian band The Damn Truth covered the song for a television commercial for Yves Saint Laurent's Mon Paris.

== Personnel ==
U2

- Bono – vocals
- The Edge – guitar, keyboards
- Adam Clayton – bass guitar
- Larry Mullen, Jr. – drums, percussion

Additional performers

- Brian Eno – additional keyboards

Technical

- Production – Daniel Lanois
- Engineering – Flood
- Engineering assistance – Robbie Adams and Shannon Strong
- Mixing – Lanois and Flood
- Mixing assistance – Strong
