= Numb (U2 song) =

1993 song by U2

- VHS single cover

Single by U2

from the album Zooropa
- Released: June 1993
- Recorded: 1990–1993
- Genre: Alternative rock; industrial rock
- Length: 4:22
- Label: Island; PolyGram
- Composer: U2
- Lyricist: The Edge
- Producers: Flood; Brian Eno; The Edge

U2 singles chronology
"Who's Gonna Ride Your Wild Horses" (1992)	"Numb" (1993)	"Lemon" (1993)

Alternative cover
- Promo CD version of "Numb"

Music videos
- "Numb" on YouTube
- "Numb (Remix)" on YouTube

"Numb" is a song by Irish rock band U2. It is the third track from their eighth album, Zooropa (1993), and was released in June 1993 by Island Records and PolyGram as the album's first single. The song features a monotonous mantra of "don't" commands spoken by guitarist the Edge amidst a backdrop of various sound effects and samples. The noisy composition and lyrical concept for "Numb" were inspired by the theme of sensory overload, which had prominently been incorporated into the Zoo TV Tour. Lead singer Bono and drummer Larry Mullen Jr. provided backing vocals on the track.

"Numb" originated as a discarded song from the Achtung Baby recording sessions called "Down All the Days". While recording Zooropa, the band transformed the song with mixing assistance from co-producer Flood, the addition of keyboards and samples by co-producer Brian Eno, and the addition of the Edge's monotone vocals. The song was released as a VHS single, featuring music videos directed by Kevin Godley and Emergency Broadcast Network, respectively, but it did not attain widespread commercial success. U2 added "Numb" to their live set lists after resuming their Zoo TV Tour in May 1993, but like most songs on Zooropa it has never been performed live since the end of that tour.

== Recording and production ==
"Numb" originated as a discarded song from the Achtung Baby sessions called "Down All the Days" (later released in the premium editions of Achtung Baby's 20th anniversary reissue) that was recorded with producer Daniel Lanois at Berlin's Hansa Studios. The band was not fond of the track—Robbie Adams, who was an engineer for the Achtung Baby sessions, said it was "quite a ballady song and in the end it was decided that it didn't fit" on that record. Guitarist the Edge said, "It almost worked," calling it a "quite unhinged electronic backing track with a very traditional melody and lyrics" sung by lead vocalist Bono.

During the Zooropa sessions, U2 revisited the song. At Windmill Lane Studios, producer Brian Eno began working with a stereo submix of the Berlin version, containing guitar, bass, bass pedals and drums, that Flood had created. Eno added about six or seven tracks of keyboards to the submix, mostly samples and strings from a Yamaha DX7 synthesiser. Some of the samples included Arabic voices and congas. According to Adams, "The idea of his overdubs was to make up music out of non-musical noises, like loops of pieces of dialogue and video samples." The Edge called Eno's additions "fantastic".

The song's biggest contribution came while the band were organizing the final running order for Zooropa. The Edge spent several hours in another studio with the mix, experimenting with ideas; eventually adding vocals in a monotone, almost rapped delivery. He said that writing the lyrics "came very quickly", and that he wrote so many lyrics that two verses had to be cut from the song. His vocals were recorded at Westland Studios in Dublin, where the band spent one day for the album sessions. Adams subtly added gating to his voice "to turn the level down when he wasn't singing." The addition of the Edge's vocals, for the most part, completed "Numb".

Bono and drummer Larry Mullen Jr. provided backing vocals. Adams treated Bono's vocals with heavy reverb to complement his "falsetto soul voice", while Mullen provided two tracks of backing vocals, one with a falsetto and one with his natural singing voice. After the vocals were overdubbed, Adams and the Edge mixed the track at Westland Studios. The Edge described it as "a few hours' work and a lot of editing", but said the mixing was "the easiest thing in the world" Flood concurred, calling the mixing "very straightforward". A sample of a Walkman cassette player rewinding was accidentally recorded onto the audio tapes, but the group liked the sound and looped it throughout the song. The final mix comprised about 15 or 16 audio tracks.

== Composition ==
"Numb" runs for 4:20 (4 minutes, 20 seconds). According to Hal Leonard Corporation’s sheet music published at Musicnotes.com, it is played in common time at a tempo of 91 beats per minute. It is an industrial rock-influenced song featuring a noisy backdrop of sampled, rhythmic noises, including "arcade sounds", and a Walkman rewinding. One of the samples is from Leni Riefenstahl's 1935 propaganda film Triumph of the Will of a Hitler Youth boy playing a bass drum; a video clip of the sample was used as on-screen imagery during future concerts on the band's Zoo TV Tour. The Edge sings lead vocals, providing a monotone list of "don't" commands: "Don't move / Don't talk out of time / Don't think / Don't worry / Everything's just fine." Mullen's backing vocals were the first occasion that he sang on a U2 song. Bono contributed "Fat Lady" falsetto vocals, which he provided on other Zooropa songs, as well. The various sounds in "Numb" were meant to "recreate that feeling of sensory overload", a theme prevalent on the Zoo TV Tour. Similarly, the Edge's lyrics "tapped into many of the ideas behind Zoo TV, the sense that we were being bombarded by so much information that you find yourself shutting down and unable to respond."

== Release ==
"Numb" was an unlikely choice for a first single, and was released in an even more unlikely format, a video single. Though Madonna had already released "Justify My Love" as a video single in 1990 following the blacklisting of that video by MTV, and had existed a decade before with the Human League's 1983 video single, it was an unusual release mode for the early 1990s; DVD singles became commonplace by the latter part of the decade.

A remix of "Numb" appeared in the 1995 movie Showgirls. This song was also remixed by producer Mike Hedges for U2's compilation release for the 1990s, The Best of 1990-2000.

The main guitar riff was extensively sampled by the band Haim on their 2025 song "Now It's Time."

== Critical reception ==
Stephen Thomas Erlewine from AllMusic called the song a wonderful moment from the album, noting the Edge's "droning mantra". Larry Flick from Billboard magazine wrote, "Don't be startled ... that's the Edge's lead vocal on this first cut lifted from the chameleon-like band's new Zooropa album. A dense, Euro-pop groove percolates underneath understated, but slicing guitar riffs and a carnival-style keyboard line. Bono's falsetto musings can be caught swirling in the background, while the Edge's delivery is more akin to synth chords than proper singing. Wonderfully adventurous as a splash of cold, refreshing water on blahblah album-rock and alternative formats. Aaah!" Alan Jones from Music Week noted the "rare starring vocal" by the vocalist on the "appositely named" song. A reviewer from People Magazine said songs like "Numb" "are too minimal for their own good". David Cavanagh from Select named it "a stripped-down stylistic tour de force." He added, "Over great distorted bursts of his own guitar, The Edge intones a seemingly endless litany of short instructions in a strange detached monotone, all of them commencing with the word don't."

== Music video ==
Music video showing Adam Clayton tying down the Edge, whilst Mullen sings the line "I feel numb", followed by Bono singing "Too much it's not enough".

The main music video for "Numb" was directed by British singer, songwriter, musician and music video director Kevin Godley. It features the Edge staring straight into the camera sitting under a dripping tap, while strange things happen to him, such as having feet put on his face, being tied down by the other group members, and belly dancer Morleigh Steinberg (later his wife) performing in front of him.

The video remix was produced by the performance group Emergency Broadcast Network and features, apart from a different performance from the Edge, a number of television and film clips making up much of the industrial beat of the song. The video and sound segments from the video remix were eventually incorporated into the band's live performances of the song on the Zoo TV Tour. The video remix was performed live at the 1993 MTV Video Music Awards in Los Angeles, with only the Edge and multiple video screens on stage.

The commercial single itself was released in video format only on VHS, echoing the television theme from their Zoo TV Tour although limited copies of promotional vinyl and CDs do exist. The video was placed at #16 on NME’s list of "50 Worst Music Videos Ever", but was also described by Stylus Magazine as "sublimely bizarre".

== Track listing ==
VHS release
No.	Title	Length
1.	"Numb" (Video)	4:18
2.	"Numb" (Video remix)	4:52
3.	"Love Is Blindness" (Video)	4:23

== Personnel ==
- Bono – backing vocals
- The Edge – guitars, synthesizers, lead vocals
- Adam Clayton – bass guitar
- Larry Mullen Jr. – drums, percussion, backing vocals

Additional personnel

- Brian Eno – synthesizers, arcade sounds

== Charts ==
=== Weekly charts ===
Chart (1993)	Peak position
Australia (ARIA)	7
Canada Top Singles (RPM)	9
Europe (European Hit Radio)	12
Iceland (Íslenski Listinn Topp 40)	2
Netherlands (Single Top 100 Tipparade)	15
New Zealand (Recorded Music NZ)	13
UK Airplay (Music Week)	23
US Radio Songs (Billboard)	61
US Alternative Airplay (Billboard)	2
US Mainstream Rock (Billboard)	18
US Pop Airplay (Billboard)	39

=== Year-end charts ===
Chart (1993)	Position
Canada Top Singles (RPM)	74
Iceland (Íslenski Listinn Topp 40)	59

== See also ==
- List of covers of U2 songs – Numb
