= U2 =

Irish rock band

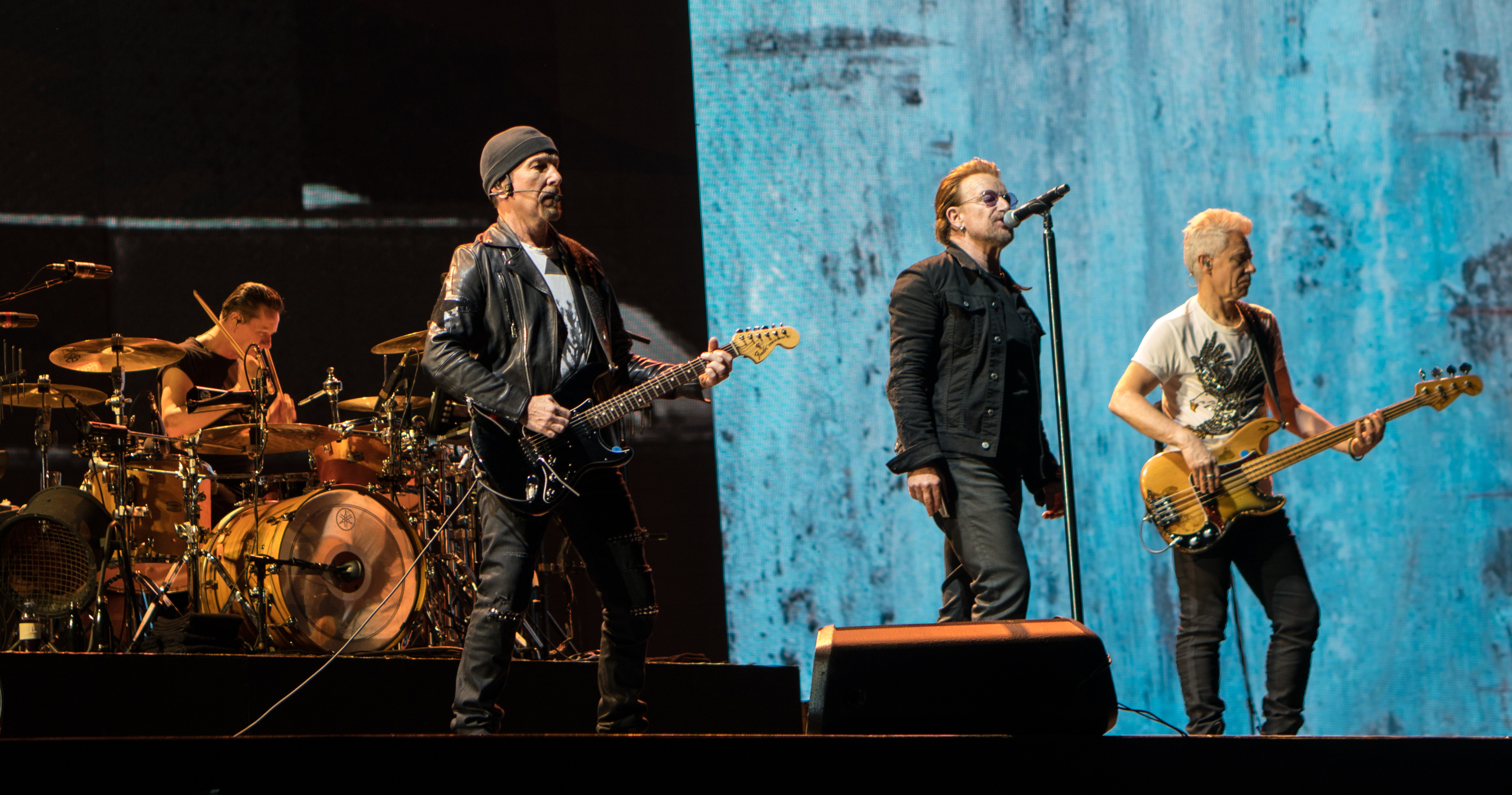
- U2 performing in Brussels, Belgium, August 2017. From left: Larry Mullen Jr.; the Edge; Bono; Adam Clayton

Background information
- Also known as: Feedback (1976–1977); The Hype (1977–1978)
- Origin: Dublin, Ireland
- Genres: Rock; alternative rock; pop rock; post-punk
- Works: Discography; songs
- Years active: 1976–present
- Labels: Island; Interscope; Mercury; CBS Ireland
- Awards: Full list
- Members: Bono; The Edge; Adam Clayton; Larry Mullen Jr.
- Past members: Dik Evans; Ivan McCormick
- Website: u2.com

U2 are an Irish rock band formed in Dublin in 1976. They comprise Bono (lead vocals), the Edge (lead guitar, keyboards, and vocals), Adam Clayton (bass guitar), and Larry Mullen Jr. (drums and percussion). Initially rooted in post-punk, U2's musical style has evolved throughout their career, yet has maintained an anthemic quality built on Bono's expressive vocals and the Edge's chiming, effects-based guitar sounds. Bono's lyrics, often embellished with spiritual imagery, focus on personal and sociopolitical themes. Popular for their live performances, the group have staged several elaborate tours.

The band formed when the members were teenaged pupils of Mount Temple Comprehensive School and had limited musical proficiency. Within four years, they signed with Island Records and released their debut album, Boy (1980). Works such as their first UK number-one album, War (1983), and singles "Sunday Bloody Sunday" and "Pride (In the Name of Love)" helped establish U2's reputation as a politically and socially conscious group. Their fourth album, The Unforgettable Fire (1984), was their first collaboration with producers Brian Eno and Daniel Lanois, whose influence resulted in a more abstract, ambient sound for the band. By the mid-1980s, U2 had become renowned globally for their live act, highlighted by their performance at Live Aid in 1985. Their fifth album, The Joshua Tree (1987), made them international stars and was their greatest critical and commercial success. One of the world's best-selling albums with 25 million copies sold, it yielded the group's only number-one singles in the US: "With or Without You" and "I Still Haven't Found What I'm Looking For".

Facing creative stagnation and a backlash to their documentary and double album Rattle and Hum (1988), U2 reinvented themselves in the 1990s. Beginning with their acclaimed seventh album, Achtung Baby (1991), and the multimedia spectacle of the Zoo TV Tour, the band pursued a new musical direction influenced by alternative, industrial, and electronic dance music, and they embraced a more ironic, flippant image. This experimentation continued on Zooropa (1993) and concluded after Pop (1997) and the PopMart Tour, which polarized audiences and critics. The group re-established a more conventional, mainstream sound on All That You Can't Leave Behind (2000) and How to Dismantle an Atomic Bomb (2004), which were critical and commercial successes. Sales of subsequent albums declined, but the group remained a popular live act. The U2 360° Tour of 2009–2011 held records for the most-attended and highest-grossing concert tour until 2019. Songs of Innocence (2014), the first of two companion albums in the 2010s, was criticised for its pervasive release through the iTunes Store. In 2023, U2 released Songs of Surrender, an album of re-recorded songs, and began the U2:UV Achtung Baby Live concert residency to inaugurate Sphere in the Las Vegas Valley. The band commemorated its 50th anniversary in 2026 with the release of two companion EPs and their 16th studio album, Carnaval de Luz.

U2 have released 15 studio albums and are one of the world's best-selling music artists, having sold an estimated 170 million records worldwide. Their accolades include 22 Grammy Awards, eight Brit Awards, four Ivor Novello Awards, and two Golden Globe Awards. They were inducted into the UK Music Hall of Fame in 2004 and the Rock and Roll Hall of Fame in 2005. According to Pollstar, they were the second-highest-grossing live music artist from 1980 to 2022, earning US$2.13 billion. Rolling Stone ranked U2 at number 22 on its list of the "100 Greatest Artists of All Time". Throughout their career, as a band and as individuals, they have campaigned for human rights and social justice causes, working with organisations and coalitions that include Amnesty International, Jubilee 2000, DATA/the ONE Campaign, Product Red, War Child, and Music Rising.

== History ==
=== Formation and early years (1976–1980) ===
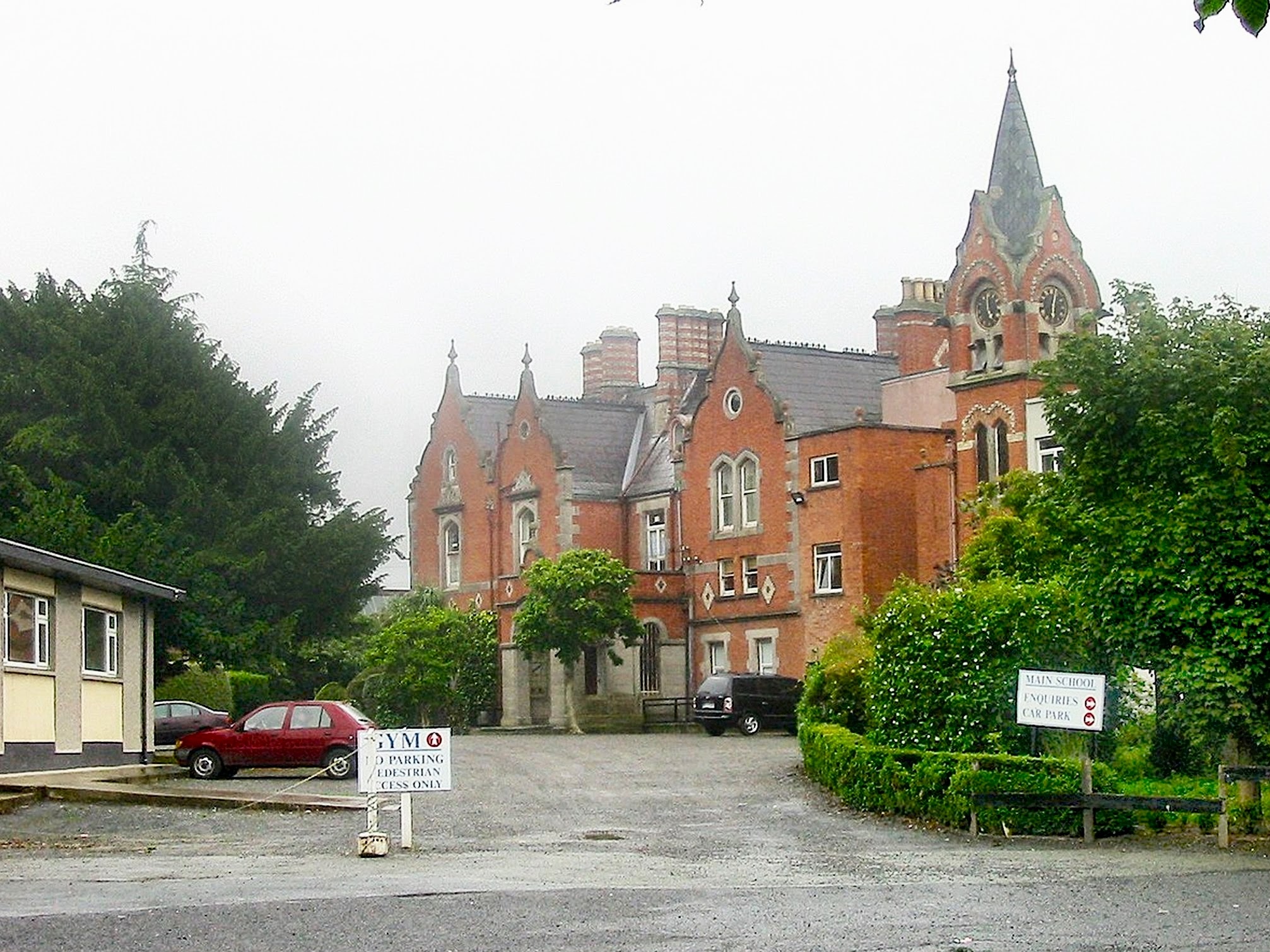
The band formed in 1976 while attending Mount Temple Comprehensive School (pictured in 2007) in Dublin.

In 1976, Larry Mullen Jr., then a 14-year-old pupil of Mount Temple Comprehensive School in Dublin, Ireland, posted a note on the school's notice board in search of musicians for a new band. For the first practice, which was held on 25 September in Mullen's kitchen, Mullen played drums and was joined by at least five other people: Paul Hewson ("Bono Vox") on lead vocals; David Evans ("the Edge") and his older brother Dik Evans on guitar; Adam Clayton, a friend of the Evans brothers, on bass guitar; and Ivan McCormick. Mullen later described it as "'The Larry Mullen Band' for about ten minutes, then Bono walked in and blew any chance I had of being in charge." Peter Martin, a friend of Mullen and McCormick, loaned his guitar and amplifier for the first practice, but he could not play and was quickly phased out; sources differ on whether he was in attendance at the first meeting or not. Within a few weeks, McCormick was also dropped from the group. The remaining five members settled on the name "Feedback" for the group because it was one of the few technical terms they knew. Early rehearsals took place in their music teacher's classroom at Mount Temple. Most of their initial material consisted of cover songs, which they admitted was not their forte. The emergence of punk rock, in particular the influence of acts such as the Stranglers, the Jam, the Clash, Buzzcocks, and Sex Pistols, convinced them that musical proficiency was not a prerequisite to success.

We couldn't believe it. I was completely shocked. We weren't of an age to go out partying as such but I don't think anyone slept that night ... Really, it was just a great affirmation to win that competition, even though I've no idea how good we were or what the competition was really like. But to win at that point was incredibly important for morale and everyone's belief in the whole project.

— The Edge, on the band's winning a 1978 talent contest in Limerick

In April 1977, Feedback played their first gig for a paying audience at St. Fintan's High School. Shortly thereafter, the band changed their name to "The Hype". Dik Evans, who was older and by that time attending college, was becoming the odd man out of the group. The other members were leaning towards the idea of a four-piece ensemble. In March 1978, the group changed their name to "U2", selecting it from a list of six options suggested by Steve Averill, a punk rock musician with the Radiators from Space and a family friend of Clayton. The band chose U2 for its open-ended interpretations, visual strength on posters, and because it was the name that they disliked the least. Dik Evans officially left the band with a farewell concert at the Presbyterian Hall in Sutton on 4 March. During the show, which featured the group playing cover songs as the Hype, Dik ceremonially walked offstage. The remaining four members returned later in the concert to play original material as U2. Dik joined the Virgin Prunes, a band made up of mutual friends of U2; early on, the Prunes served as U2's default opening act, and the two groups often shared members for live performances to fill in for occasional absences. On 18 March, the four-piece U2 won the "Pop Group '78" talent contest sponsored by the Evening Press and Guinness's Harp Lager as part of Limerick Civic Week. The win was an important milestone and affirmation for the fledgling act. The contest prize consisted of £500 (equivalent to £2,732 in 2025) and a recording session for a demo that would be heard by the record label CBS Ireland. U2's demo tape was recorded at Keystone Studios in Dublin in April 1978, but the results were largely unsuccessful due to their inexperience.

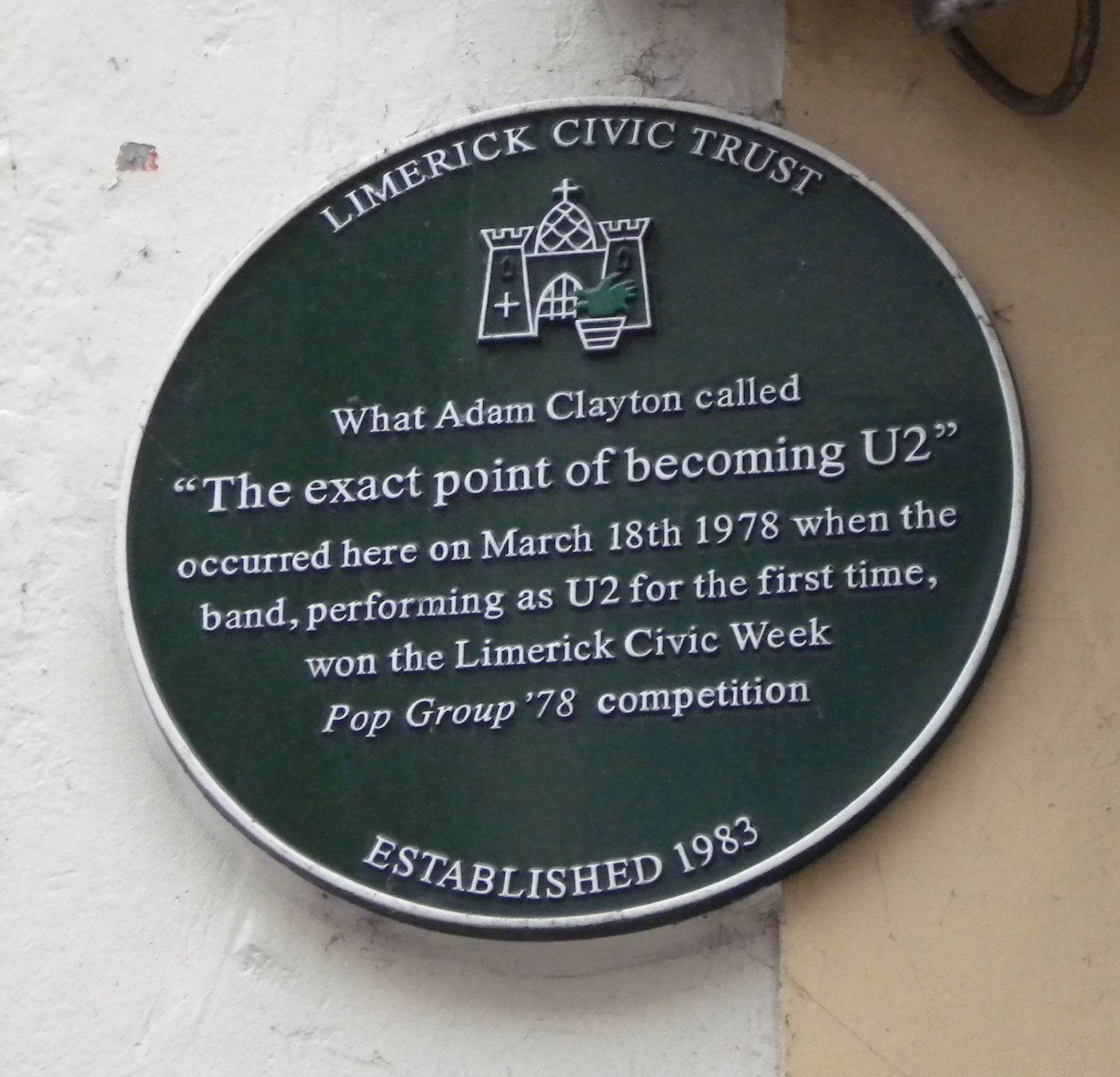
A plaque commemorating U2's victory in the 1978 Limerick Civic Week "Pop Group" music talent contest

Irish magazine Hot Press was influential in shaping U2's future; in addition to being one of their earliest allies, the publication's journalist Bill Graham introduced the band to Paul McGuinness, who agreed to be their manager in mid-1978. With the connections he was making within the music industry, McGuinness booked demo sessions for the group and sought to garner them a record deal. The band continued to build their fanbase with performances across Ireland, the most famous of which were a series of weekend afternoon shows at Dublin's Dandelion Market in mid-1979.

In August 1979, U2 recorded demos at Windmill Lane Studios with CBS talent scout Chas de Whalley as producer, marking the first of the band's many recordings at the studio during their career. The following month, three songs from the session were released by CBS in Ireland as the EP Three. It was the group's first chart success, selling all 1,000 copies of its limited edition 12-inch vinyl almost immediately. In December 1979, the band performed in London for their first shows outside Ireland, although they were unable to gain much attention from audiences or critics. On 26 February 1980, their second single, "Another Day", was released on the CBS label, again only for the Irish market. The same day, U2 performed at the 2,000-seat National Stadium in Dublin as part of an Irish tour. Despite their gamble of booking a concert in such a large venue, the move paid off. Bill Stewart, an A&R representative for Island Records, was in attendance and offered to sign them to the label. The following month, the band signed a four-year, four-album contract with Island, which included a £50,000 advance (equivalent to £214,545 in 2025) and £50,000 in tour support.

=== Boy and October (1980–1982) ===
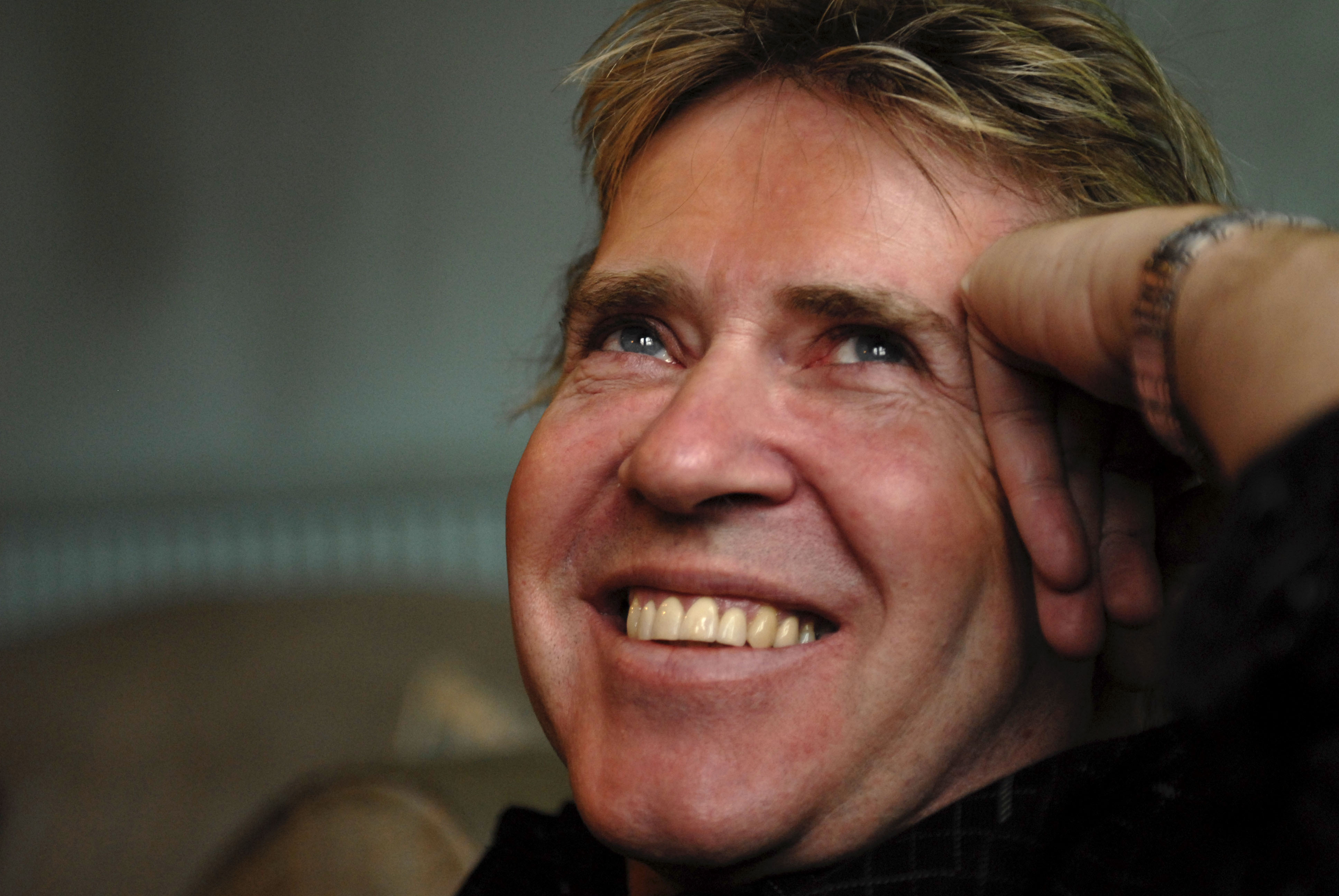
Steve Lillywhite produced the band's first three studio albums: Boy, October, and War.

In May 1980, U2 released "11 O'Clock Tick Tock", their first international single and their debut on Island, but it failed to chart. Martin Hannett, who produced the single, was in consideration to produce the band's debut album, Boy, but was replaced with Steve Lillywhite. From July to September 1980, U2 recorded the album at Windmill Lane Studios, drawing from their nearly 40-song repertoire at the time. Lillywhite employed an experimental approach as producer, setting up Mullen's drums in a stairwell and recording overdubs such as smashed bottles and cutlery skimmed against a spinning bicycle wheel. The band found Lillywhite very encouraging and creative; Bono called him "such a breath of fresh air", and the Edge said he "had a great way of pulling the best out of everybody". The album's lead single, "A Day Without Me", was released in August. Although it did not chart, the song was the impetus for the Edge's purchase of a delay effect unit, the Electro-Harmonix Memory Man, which came to define his guitar playing style.

Released in October 1980, Boy received generally positive reviews. Paul Morley of NME called it "touching, precocious, full of archaic and modernist conviction", while Declan Lynch of Hot Press said he found it "almost impossible to react negatively to U2's music". Bono's lyrics reflected on adolescence, innocence, and the passage into adulthood, themes represented on the album cover by a closeup of an adolescent Peter Rowen, the younger brother of Bono's friend Guggi. Boy peaked at number 52 in the United Kingdom and number 63 in the United States. The album included the band's first songs to receive airplay on US radio, including the single "I Will Follow", which reached number 20 on Billboard's Top Tracks rock chart. Boy's release was followed by the Boy Tour, U2's first tour of continental Europe and the US. Reviewing the band's early live performances, critics complimented their ambition and Bono's exuberance, and found the shows to be illustrative of U2's potential despite lacking polish.

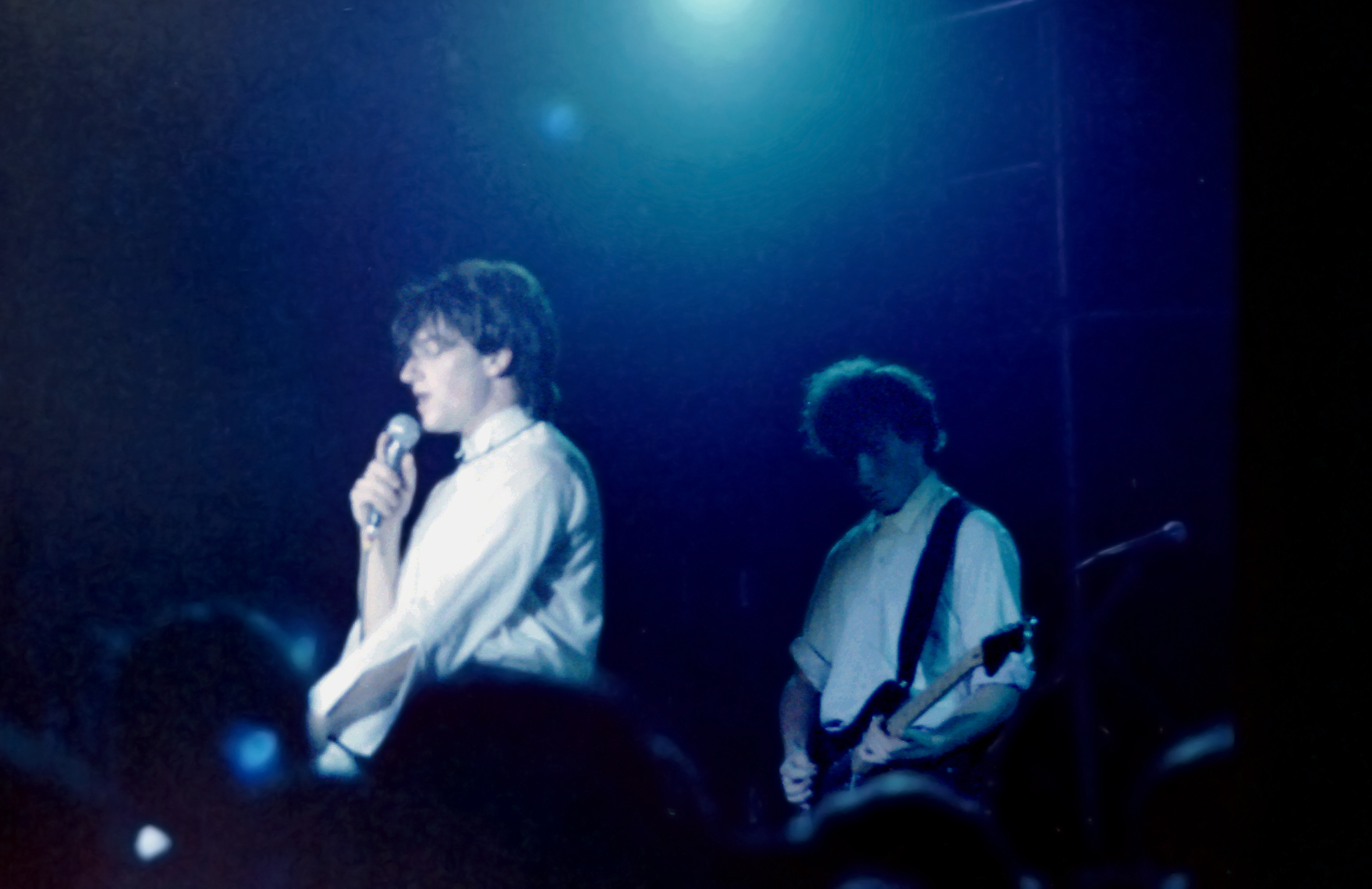
Bono and the Edge performing on the Boy Tour in May 1981

The band faced several challenges in writing their second album, October. On an American leg of the Boy Tour, Bono's briefcase containing in-progress lyrics and musical ideas was lost backstage during a March 1981 performance at a nightclub in Portland, Oregon. The band had limited time to write new music on tour and in July began a two-month recording session at Windmill Lane Studios largely unprepared, forcing Bono to quickly improvise lyrics. Lillywhite, reprising his role as producer, called the sessions "completely chaotic and mad". October's lead single, "Fire", was released in July and was U2's first song to chart in the UK. Despite earning the band an appearance on UK television programme Top of the Pops, the single fell in the charts afterwards. On 16 August 1981, the group opened for Thin Lizzy at the inaugural Slane Concert; the Edge called it one of U2's worst shows. Adding to this period of self-doubt, Bono's, the Edge's, and Mullen's involvement in a Charismatic Christian group in Dublin called the "Shalom Fellowship" led them to question the relationship between their religious faith and the lifestyle of a rock band. Bono and the Edge considered quitting U2 due to their perceived spiritual conflicts before deciding to leave Shalom instead.

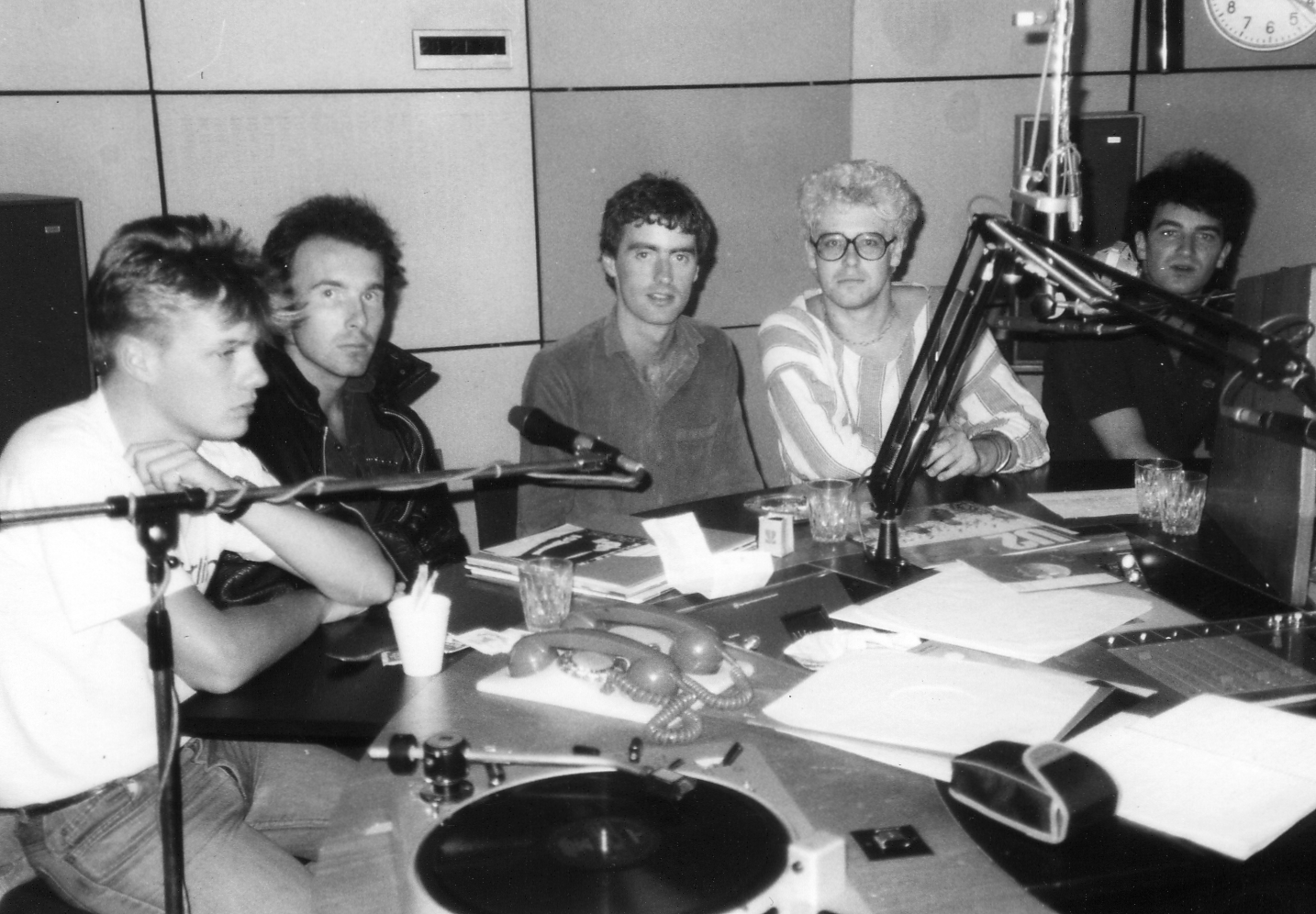
U2 with radio host Dave Fanning (centre) in February 1982

October was released in October 1981 and contained overtly spiritual themes. The album received mixed reviews and limited radio play. It debuted at number 11 in the UK, but sold poorly elsewhere. The single "Gloria" was U2's first song to have its music video played on MTV, generating excitement for the band during the October Tour of 1981–1982 in markets where the television channel was available. During the tour, U2 met Dutch photographer Anton Corbijn, who became their principal photographer and has had a major influence on their public image. In March 1982, the band played 14 dates as the opening act for the J. Geils Band. U2 were disappointed by their lack of progress by the end of the October Tour. Having run out of money and feeling unsupported by their record label, the group committed to improving; Clayton recalled that "there was a firm resolve to come out of the box fighting with the next record".

=== War and Under a Blood Red Sky (1982–1983) ===
After the October Tour, U2 decamped to a rented cottage in Howth, where they lived, wrote new songs, and rehearsed for their third album, War. Significant musical breakthroughs were achieved by the Edge in August 1982 during a two-week period of independent songwriting, while the other band members holidayed and Bono honeymooned with his wife, Ali. From September to November, the group recorded War at Windmill Lane Studios. Lillywhite, who had a policy of not working with an artist more than twice, was convinced by the group to return as producer for a third time. The recording sessions featured contributions from violinist Steve Wickham and the female singers of Kid Creole and the Coconuts. For the first time, Mullen played drums to a click track to keep time. After completing the album, U2 played a short tour of Western Europe in December.

"Sunday Bloody Sunday" (1983)
"Sunday Bloody Sunday" features a martial drumbeat, raw guitar, and lyrically, a bleak emotionally charged response to violence.

War's lead single, "New Year's Day", was released in January 1983. It reached number 10 in the UK and became the group's first hit outside Europe; in the US, it received extensive radio coverage and peaked at number 53. Resolving their doubts of the October period, U2 released War in February. Critically, the album received favourable reviews, although a few UK reviewers were critical of it. It was the band's first commercial success, debuting at number one in the UK, while reaching number 12 in the US. War's sincerity and "rugged" guitar were intentionally at odds with the trendier synthpop of the time. Described as a record on which the band "turned pacifism itself into a crusade", War was lyrically more political than their first two records, focusing on the physical and emotional effects of warfare. The album included the protest song "Sunday Bloody Sunday", in which Bono lyrically contrasted the events of the 1972 Bloody Sunday shooting with Easter Sunday. Other songs addressed nuclear proliferation ("Seconds") and the Polish Solidarity movement ("New Year's Day"). War was U2's first record to feature Corbijn's photography. An adolescent Rowen was again featured on the album cover, with his previously innocent expression replaced by a fearful one.

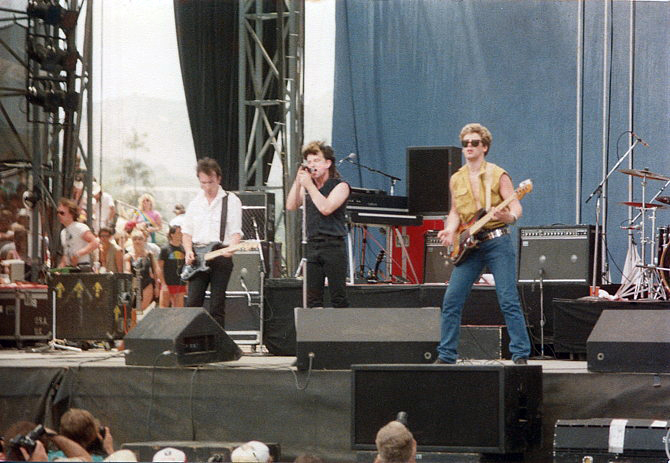
U2 performing at the US Festival in May 1983

On the subsequent 1983 War Tour of Europe, the US and Japan, the band played progressively larger venues, moving from clubs to halls to arenas. Bono attempted to engage the growing audiences with theatrical, often dangerous antics, climbing scaffolding and lighting rigs and jumping into the audience. The sight of Bono waving a white flag during performances of "Sunday Bloody Sunday" became the tour's iconic image. The band played several dates at large European and American music festivals, including a performance at the US Festival on Memorial Day weekend for an audience of 125,000 people. Nearly rained out, the group's 5 June 1983 concert at Red Rocks Amphitheatre was singled out by Rolling Stone as one of "50 Moments that Changed the History of Rock and Roll". The show was recorded for the concert video Live at Red Rocks, and was one of several concerts from the tour captured on their live album Under a Blood Red Sky. The releases received extensive play on MTV and the radio, expanding the band's audience and showcasing their prowess as a live act. During the tour, the group established a new tradition by closing concerts with the War track "40", during which the Edge and Clayton would exchange instruments and the band members would leave the stage one by one as the crowd continued to sing the refrain "How long to sing this song?". The War Tour was U2's first profitable tour, grossing about US$2 million.

=== The Unforgettable Fire and Live Aid (1984–1985) ===
With their record deal with Island Records coming to an end, U2 signed a more lucrative extension in 1984. They negotiated the return of the copyrights of their songs, an increase in their royalty rate, and a general improvement in terms, at the expense of a larger initial payment.

Following the War album and tour, U2 feared that they were in danger of becoming another "shrill", "sloganeering arena-rock band". While they were confident that fans would embrace them as successors to groups like the Who and Led Zeppelin, according to Bono: "something just didn't feel right. We felt we had more dimension than just the next big anything, we had something unique to offer." They sought experimentation for their fourth studio album, The Unforgettable Fire. Clayton said, "We were looking for something that was a bit more serious, more arty." The Edge admired the ambient and "weird works" of Brian Eno, who, along with his engineer Daniel Lanois, eventually agreed to produce the record. The decision to hire them was against the wishes of Island Records founder Chris Blackwell, who believed that just when the band were about to achieve the highest levels of success, Eno would "bury them under a layer of avant-garde nonsense".

"The Unforgettable Fire" (1984)
"The Unforgettable Fire" has a rich, symphonic sound built from ambient instrumentation, a driving rhythm, and a lyrical "sketch".

Partly recorded in Slane Castle, The Unforgettable Fire was released in October 1984 and marked a major change of style. It was ambient and abstract, and featured a rich, orchestrated sound. Under Lanois' direction, Mullen's drumming became looser, funkier, and more subtle, and Clayton's bass became more subtle. Complementing the album's atmospheric sound, the lyrics were left open to interpretation, providing what the band called a "very visual feel". Due to a tight recording schedule, Bono felt songs like "Bad" and "Pride (In the Name of Love)" were incomplete "sketches". The album reached number one in the UK, and was successful in the US. The lead single "Pride (In the Name of Love)", written about civil rights movement leader Martin Luther King Jr., was their first song to chart in the US top 40.

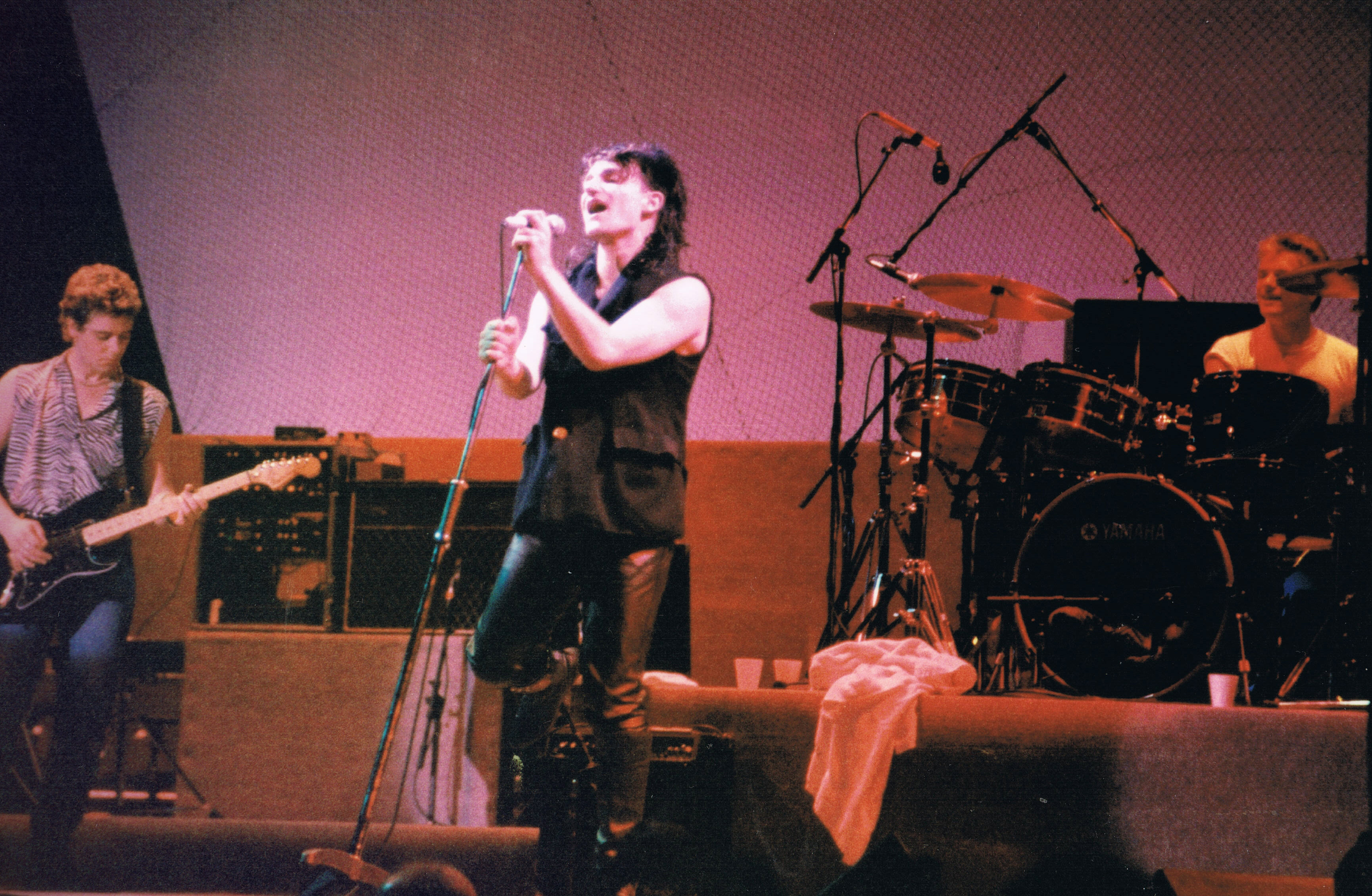
U2 performing in Sydney in September 1984 on the Unforgettable Fire Tour

Much of the Unforgettable Fire Tour moved into indoor arenas as U2 built their audience. The complex textures of the new studio-recorded tracks, such as "The Unforgettable Fire" and "Bad", was hard to translate to live performances. One solution was programming music sequencers, which the band had previously been reluctant to use but now incorporate into the majority of their performances. Songs on the album had been criticised as being "unfinished", "fuzzy", and "unfocused", but were better received by critics when played on stage. Rolling Stone, which was critical of the album version of "Bad", described its live performance as a "show stopper".

In March 1985, a Rolling Stone cover story called U2 the "Band of the '80s", saying that "for a growing number of rock & roll fans, U2 ... has become the band that matters most, maybe even the only band that matters". On 13 July 1985, the group performed at the Live Aid concert at Wembley Stadium for Ethiopian famine relief, before a crowd of 72,000 fans and a worldwide television audience of 1.5 billion people. During a 12-minute performance of "Bad", Bono climbed down from the stage to embrace and dance with a female fan he had picked out of the crowd, showing a global audience the personal connection that he could make with fans. The performance was a pivotal event in the band's career; The Guardian cited Live Aid as the moment that made stars of U2, and it included their performance on a list of 50 key events in rock history.

=== The Joshua Tree and Rattle and Hum (1986–1990) ===
The wild beauty, cultural richness, spiritual vacancy and ferocious violence of America are explored to compelling effect in virtually every aspect of The Joshua Tree—in the title and the cover art, the blues and country borrowings evident in the music ... Indeed, Bono says that 'dismantling the mythology of America' is an important part of The Joshua Tree's artistic objective.

— Anthony DeCurtis

For their fifth album, The Joshua Tree, the band wanted to build on The Unforgettable Fire's textures, but instead of experimentation, sought a harder-hitting sound within the limitation of conventional song structures. Realising that "U2 had no tradition" and that their knowledge of music from before their childhood was limited, the group delved into American and Irish roots music. Friendships with Bob Dylan, Van Morrison, and Keith Richards motivated Bono to explore blues, folk, and gospel music and to focus on his skills as a songwriter and lyricist. U2 halted the album sessions in June 1986 to play as a headline act on the Conspiracy of Hope benefit concert tour for Amnesty International. Rather than distract the band, the tour invigourated their new material. The following month, Bono travelled to Nicaragua and El Salvador and saw first-hand the distress of peasants affected by political conflicts and US military intervention. The experience became a central influence on their new music.

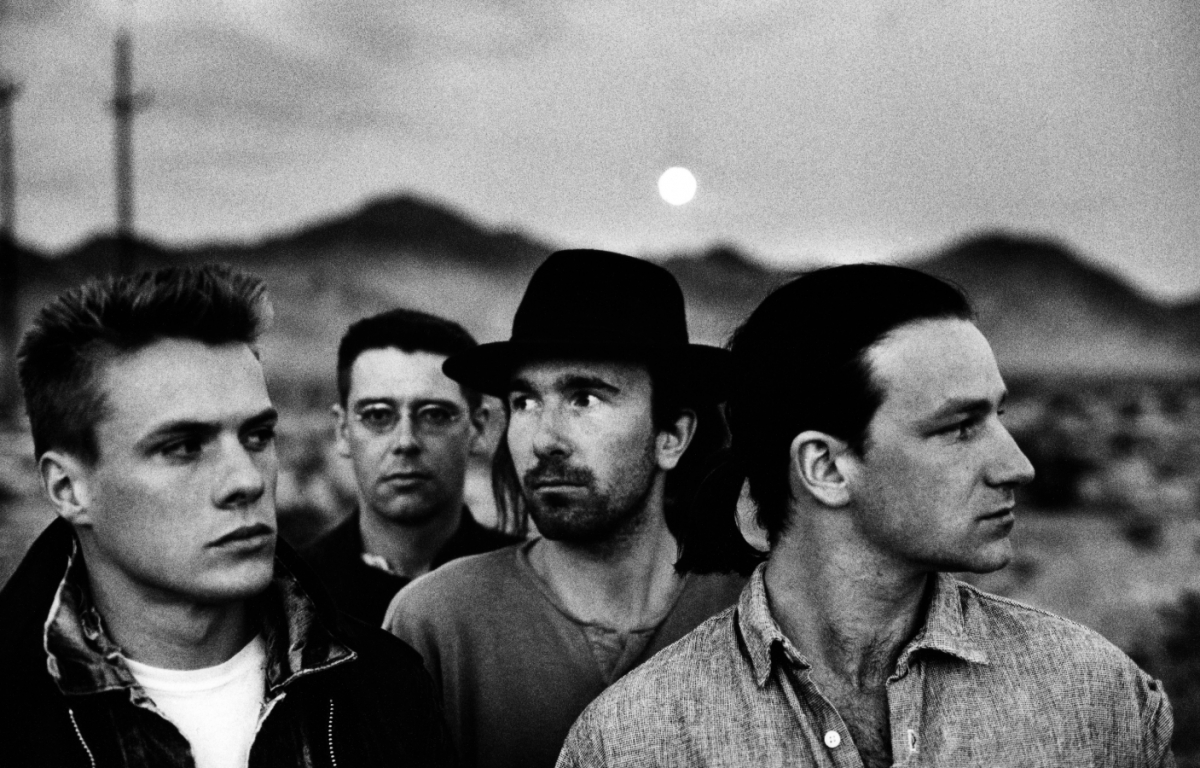
A promotional image of U2 for their 1987 album The Joshua Tree

The Joshua Tree was released in March 1987. The album juxtaposes antipathy towards US foreign policy against the group's deep fascination with the country, its open spaces, freedom, and ideals. The band wanted music with a sense of location and a "cinematic" quality, and the record draws on imagery created by American writers whose works the band had been reading. The Joshua Tree was critically acclaimed; Robert Hilburn of the Los Angeles Times said the album "confirms on record what this band has been slowly asserting for three years now on stage: U2 is what the Rolling Stones ceased being years ago—the greatest rock and roll band in the world". The record went to number one in over 20 countries, including the UK where it received a platinum certification in 48 hours and sold 235,000 copies in its first week, making it the fastest seller in British chart history at the time. In the US, it spent nine consecutive weeks at number one. The album included the hit singles "With or Without You", "I Still Haven't Found What I'm Looking For", and "Where the Streets Have No Name", the first two of which became the group's only number-one hits in the US. U2 became the fourth rock band to be featured on the cover of Time magazine, which called them "Rock's Hottest Ticket". The album and its songs received four Grammy Award nominations, winning Album of the Year and Best Rock Performance by a Duo or Group with Vocal. Rolling Stone cited The Joshua Tree as one of rock's greatest albums. The Joshua Tree Tour was the first tour on which the band played shows in stadiums alongside smaller arena shows. It was the highest-grossing North American tour of the year with US$35.1 million earned at the box office, and globally it grossed US$56 million from 3.17 million tickets sold.

In October 1988, U2 released Rattle and Hum, a double album and theatrically released documentary film that captured the band's experiences with American roots music on the Joshua Tree Tour. The record featured nine studio tracks and six live U2 performances, including recordings at Sun Studio in Memphis and collaborations with Dylan and B.B. King. Intended as a tribute to American music, one Rolling Stone editor spoke of the album's "excitement" and another described it as "misguided and bombastic". The film's director, Phil Joanou, described it as "an overly pretentious look at U2". The film underperformed at the box office and was withdrawn from theatres after three weeks, having grossed only US$8.6 million. Despite the criticism, the album sold 14 million copies and reached number one worldwide. Lead single "Desire" became the band's first number-one song in the UK while reaching number three in the US. Most of the album's new material was played on 1989–1990's Lovetown Tour, which visited Oceania, Japan, and Europe. They had grown dissatisfied with their live performances; Mullen recalled, "We were the biggest, but we weren't the best." With a sense of musical stagnation, Bono hinted at changes to come during a 30 December 1989 concert near the end of the tour; before a hometown crowd in Dublin, he said on stage that it was "the end of something for U2" and that they had to "go away and ... just dream it all up again".

=== Achtung Baby, Zoo TV, and Zooropa (1990–1993) ===
Buzzwords on this record were trashy, throwaway, dark, sexy, and industrial (all good) and earnest, polite, sweet, righteous, rockist and linear (all bad). It was good if a song took you on a journey or made you think your hifi was broken, bad if it reminded you of recording studios or U2 ...

— Brian Eno, on the recording of Achtung Baby

Stung by the criticism of Rattle and Hum, U2 sought to transform themselves musically. Seeking inspiration from German reunification, they began work on their seventh studio album, Achtung Baby, at Berlin's Hansa Studios in October 1990 with Lanois and Eno. The sessions were fraught, as the band argued over their musical direction and the quality of their material. Clayton and Mullen preferred a sound similar to U2's previous work; Bono and the Edge were inspired by European industrial music and electronic dance music and advocated a change. Weeks of tension and slow progress nearly prompted the group to break up until they made a breakthrough with the improvised writing of the song "One". They returned to Dublin in 1991, where morale improved and the majority of the album was completed.

"The Fly" (1991)
"The Fly" features hip-hop beats, distorted vocals, and a hard industrial edge that differed from U2's typical sound.

Achtung Baby was released in November 1991. The album represented a calculated change in musical and thematic style, their most dramatic since The Unforgettable Fire. Sonically, the record incorporated influences from alternative rock, dance, and industrial music, and Bono referred to it as "four men chopping down the Joshua Tree". Thematically, it was a more introspective and personal record; it was darker, yet more flippant than the band's previous work. Commercially and critically, it has been one of the band's most successful albums. It produced five hit singles, including "The Fly", "Mysterious Ways", and "One", and was a crucial part of the band's early 1990s reinvention. In 1993, Achtung Baby won the Grammy Award for Best Rock Performance by a Duo or Group with Vocal. Like The Joshua Tree, Rolling Stone cited it as one of rock's greatest.

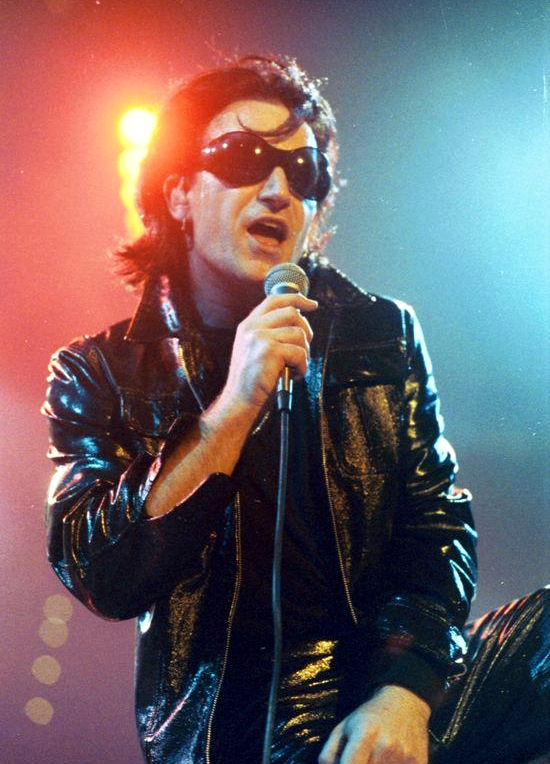
Bono in March 1992 on the Zoo TV Tour as his persona the Fly, a leather-clad egomaniac meant to parody rock stardom

Like Achtung Baby, the 1992–1993 Zoo TV Tour was a break with the band's past. In contrast to the austere stage setups of previous U2 tours, Zoo TV was an elaborate multimedia event. It satirised the pervasive nature of television and its blurring of news, entertainment, and home shopping by attempting to instill "sensory overload" in its audience. The stage featured large video screens that showed visual effects, random video clips from pop culture, and flashing text phrases, along with a lighting system partially made of Trabant cars. U2 were known for their earnest performances in the 1980s, but the Zoo TV performances were ironic and self-deprecating. Bono performed as several over-the-top characters, including the leather-clad egomaniac the Fly, the greedy televangelist Mirror Ball Man, and the devilish MacPhisto. Prank phone calls were made to US President George H. W. Bush, the United Nations, and others. Live satellite link-ups to war-torn Sarajevo caused controversy. Zoo TV was the highest-grossing North American tour of 1992, earning US$67 million.

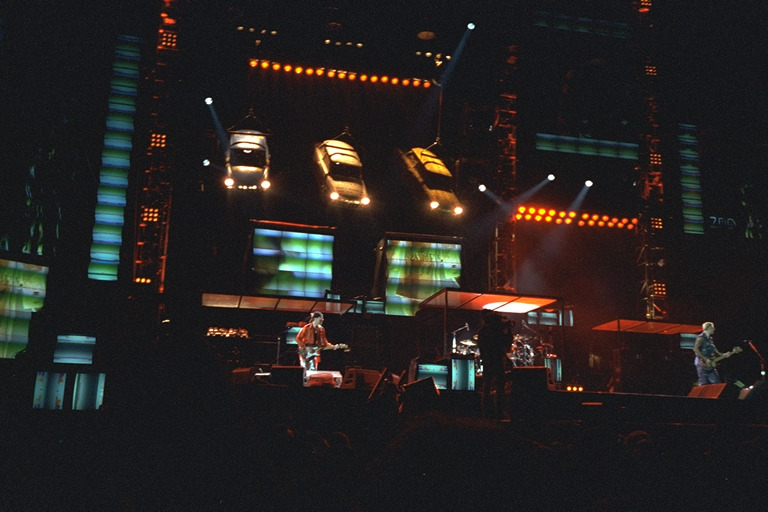
The Zoo TV Tour (pictured in May 1993) was a multimedia spectacle, featuring a stage that used dozens of video screens and a lighting system with Trabant cars.

In June 1993, U2 signed a six-album deal to remain with Island Records/PolyGram. The Los Angeles Times estimated that the deal was worth US$60 million to the band, making them the highest-paid rock group ever. The following month, U2 released a new album, Zooropa. Quickly recorded during a break in the Zoo TV Tour in early 1993, it expanded on many of the themes from Achtung Baby and the tour. Initially intended to be an EP, Zooropa evolved into a full-length LP album. It delved further into electronic, industrial, and dance music. Country musician Johnny Cash sang the lead vocals on the closing track "The Wanderer". Most of the songs were played at least once during the 1993 legs of the tour, which visited Europe, Australia, New Zealand, and Japan; half the album's tracks became long-term fixtures in the setlist. Zooropa reached the top ten in 26 countries, sold 7 million copies, and won the 1994 Grammy Award for Best Alternative Music Album, but the band regard it with mixed feelings; the Edge called it "an interlude".

Clayton's issues with alcohol came to a head on the final leg of the Zoo TV Tour. After experiencing a blackout, Clayton was unable to perform for the group's 26 November 1993 show in Sydney, which served as the dress rehearsal for a worldwide television broadcast the following night. Bass guitar technician Stuart Morgan filled in for him, the first time a member of U2 had missed a concert since their earliest days. After the incident, Clayton resolved to stop drinking alcohol. The tour concluded the following month in Japan. It earned 5.3 million in ticket sales and US$151 million in gross revenues. Q's Tom Doyle said in 2002 that Zoo TV was "the most spectacular rock tour staged by any band".

=== Passengers, Pop, and PopMart (1994–1998) ===
In 1995, following a long break, U2 contributed "Hold Me, Thrill Me, Kiss Me, Kill Me" to the soundtrack album of the film Batman Forever. The song reached number one in Australia and Ireland, number two in the UK, and number 16 in the US. In November, the band released an experimental album called Original Soundtracks 1, a collaboration with Brian Eno, who contributed as a full songwriting partner and performer. Due to his participation and the record's experimental nature, the band released it under the moniker "Passengers" to distinguish it from U2's conventional albums. Mullen said of the release: "There's a thin line between interesting music and self-indulgence. We crossed it on the Passengers record." It was commercially unnoticed by U2 standards and it received mixed reviews. The single "Miss Sarajevo" (featuring Luciano Pavarotti) was among Bono's favourite U2 songs.

U2 began work on their next studio album, Pop, in mid-1995, holding recording sessions with Nellee Hooper, Flood, and Howie B. The band mixed the contrasting influences of each producer into their music, in particular Howie B's experiences with electronica and dance music. Mullen was sidelined due to back surgery in November, prompting the other band members to take different approaches to songwriting, such as programming drum loops and playing to samples provided by Howie B. Upon Mullen's return in February 1996, the group began reworking their material but struggled to complete songs, causing them to miss their mid-year deadline to complete the record. The band allowed manager Paul McGuinness to book their 1997–1998 PopMart Tour with the album still in progress; Bono called it "the worst decision U2 ever made". Rushed to complete the album, the band delayed its release date a second time from late 1996 to March 1997, cutting into tour rehearsal time. Even with the additional recording time, U2 worked up to the last minute to complete songs.

In February 1997, the group released Pop's lead single, "Discothèque", a dance-heavy song with a music video in which the band wore Village People costumes. The song reached number one in the UK, Japan, and Canada, but did not chart for long in the US despite debuting at number 10. Within days of the single's release, the group announced the PopMart Tour with a press conference in the lingerie section of a Kmart department store. Tickets went on sale shortly after, but Pop would not be released until March. The album represented U2's further exploration of nightclub culture, featuring heavy, funky dance rhythms. The record drew favourable reviews. Rolling Stone stated that U2 had "defied the odds and made some of the greatest music of their lives". Other critics felt that the album was a major disappointment. Despite debuting at number one in over 30 countries, Pop dropped off the charts quickly. Bono admitted that the album "didn't communicate the way it was intended to", while the Edge called it a "compromise project by the end".

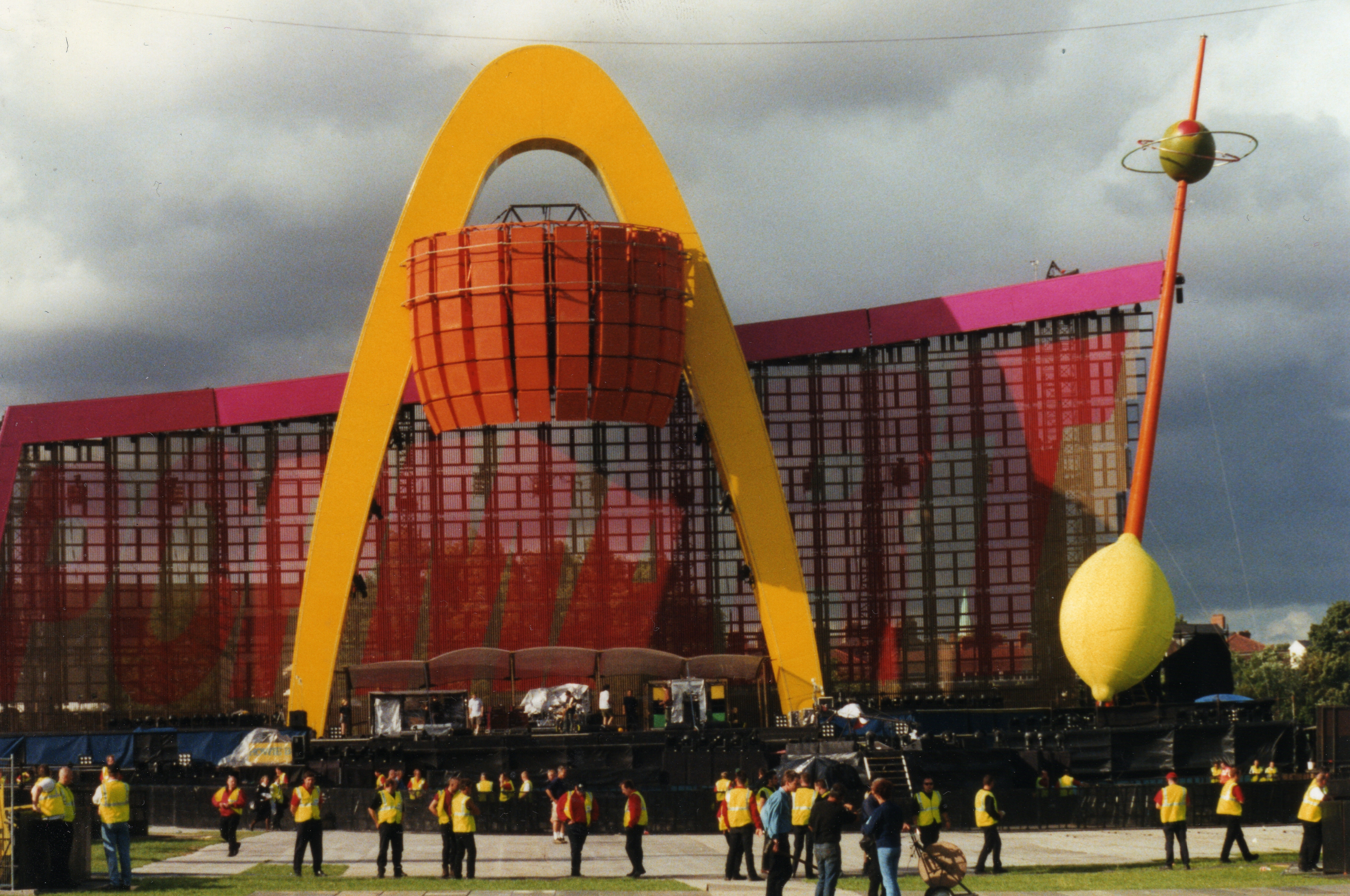

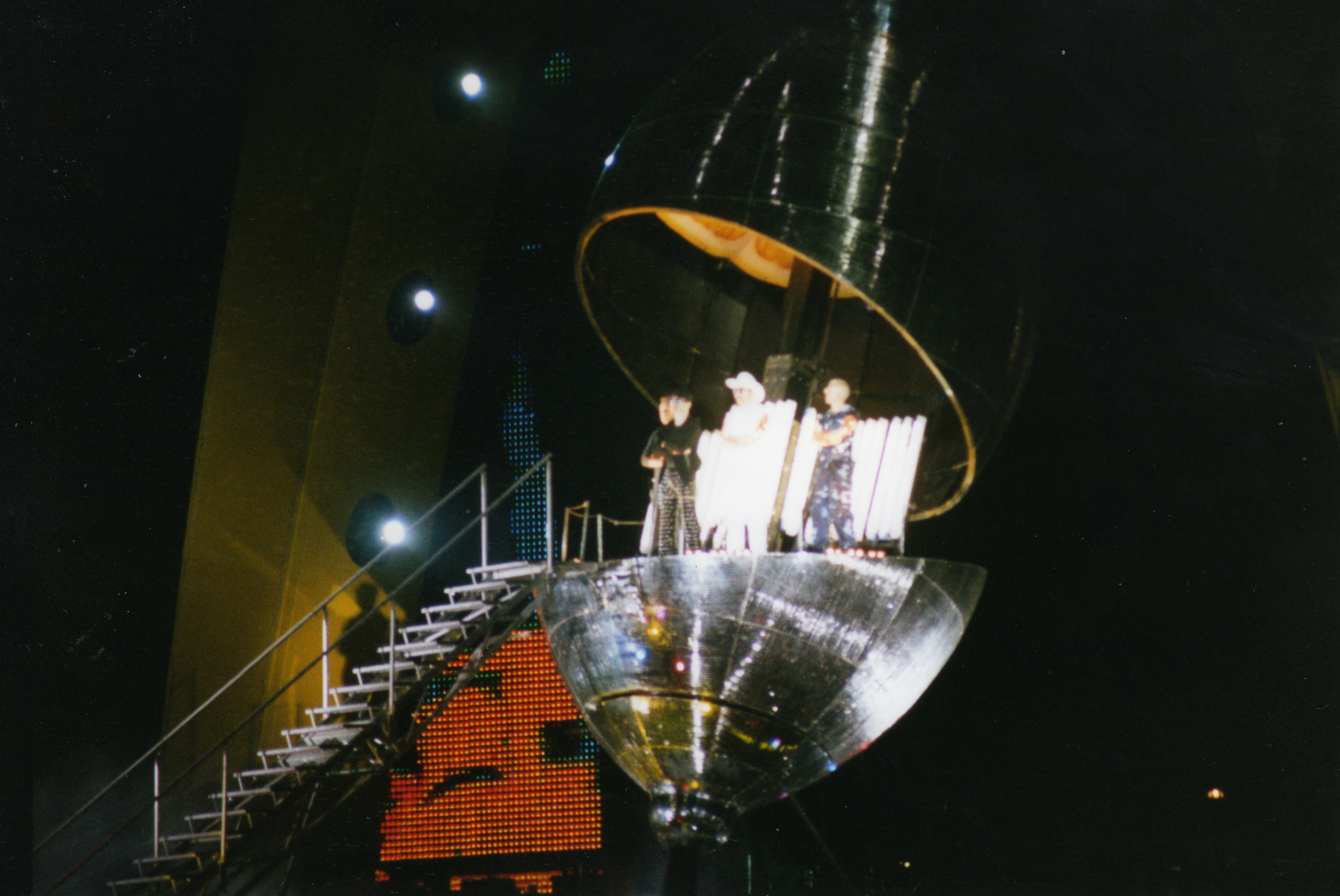
The PopMart Tour stage featured a golden arch, mirrorball lemon, and 150-foot-long LED screen. The band emerged from the lemon during encores, although it occasionally malfunctioned.

The PopMart Tour began in April 1997 and was intended as a satire of consumerism. The stage included a 100-foot-tall (30 m) golden yellow arch reminiscent of the McDonald's logo, a 40-foot-tall (12 m) mirrorball lemon, and a 150-foot-long (46 m) LED video screen, at the time the world's largest. U2's "big shtick" failed to satisfy many who were seemingly confused by the band's new kitsch image and the tour's elaborate set. The reduced rehearsal time for the tour affected the quality of early shows, and in some US markets, the band played to half-empty stadiums. On several occasions, the mirrorball lemon from which the band emerged for the encores malfunctioned, trapping them inside. Despite the mixed reviews and difficulties of the tour, Bono considered PopMart to be "better than Zoo TV aesthetically, and as an art project it is a clearer thought." He later explained, "When that show worked, it was mindblowing."

The group's 20 September 1997 show in Reggio Emilia was attended by over 150,000 people, which was reported to have set a world record for the largest paying audience for a one-act show. U2 also performed in Sarajevo on 23 September, making them the first major group to stage a concert there following the Bosnian War. Mullen described the show as "an experience I will never forget for the rest of my life, and if I had to spend 20 years in the band just to play that show, and have done that, I think it would have been worthwhile." Bono called the show "one of the toughest and one of the sweetest nights of my life." The tour concluded in March 1998 with gross revenues of US$173.6 million and 3.98 million tickets sold. The following month, U2 appeared on the 200th episode of the animated sitcom The Simpsons, in which Homer Simpson disrupts the band on stage during a PopMart concert. In November 1998, U2 released their first compilation album, The Best of 1980–1990, which featured a re-recording of a 1987 B-side, "Sweetest Thing", as its single. The album broke a first-week sales record in the US for a greatest hits collection by a group, and "Sweetest Thing" topped the singles charts in Ireland and Canada.

=== All That You Can't Leave Behind and Elevation Tour (1998–2002) ===
Following their musical pursuits in the 1990s, U2 sought to simplify their sound; the Edge said that with Pop, the group had "taken the deconstruction of the rock 'n' roll band format to its absolute 'nth degree". For their tenth album, All That You Can't Leave Behind, the group wanted to return to their old recording ethos of "the band in a room playing together". Reuniting with Eno and Lanois, U2 began working on the album in late 1998. After their experiences with being pressured to complete Pop, the band were content to work without deadlines. With Bono's schedule limited by his commitments to debt relief for Jubilee 2000 and the other band members spending time with their families, the recording sessions lasted until August 2000.

Released that October, All That You Can't Leave Behind was seen by critics as a "back to basics" album, on which the group returned to a more mainstream, conventional rock sound. For many of those not won over by the band's forays into dance music, it was considered a return to grace; Rolling Stone called it U2's "third masterpiece" alongside The Joshua Tree and Achtung Baby. The album debuted at number one in 32 countries and sold 12 million copies. Its lead single, "Beautiful Day", reached number one in Ireland, the UK, Australia, and Canada, and number 21 in the US. The song won Grammy Awards for Best Rock Performance by a Duo or Group with Vocal, Song of the Year, and Record of the Year. At the awards ceremony, Bono declared that U2 were "reapplying for the job ... [of] the best band in the world". The album's other singles, "Stuck in a Moment You Can't Get Out Of", "Elevation", and "Walk On", reached number one in Canada, and charted in the top five in the UK and top ten in Australia.

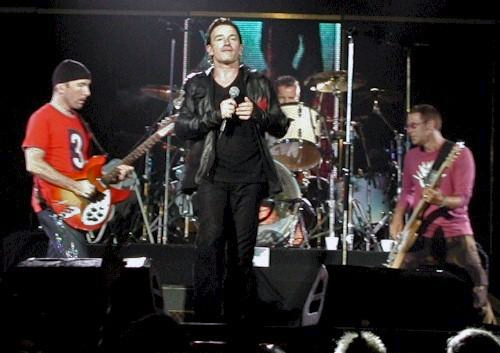

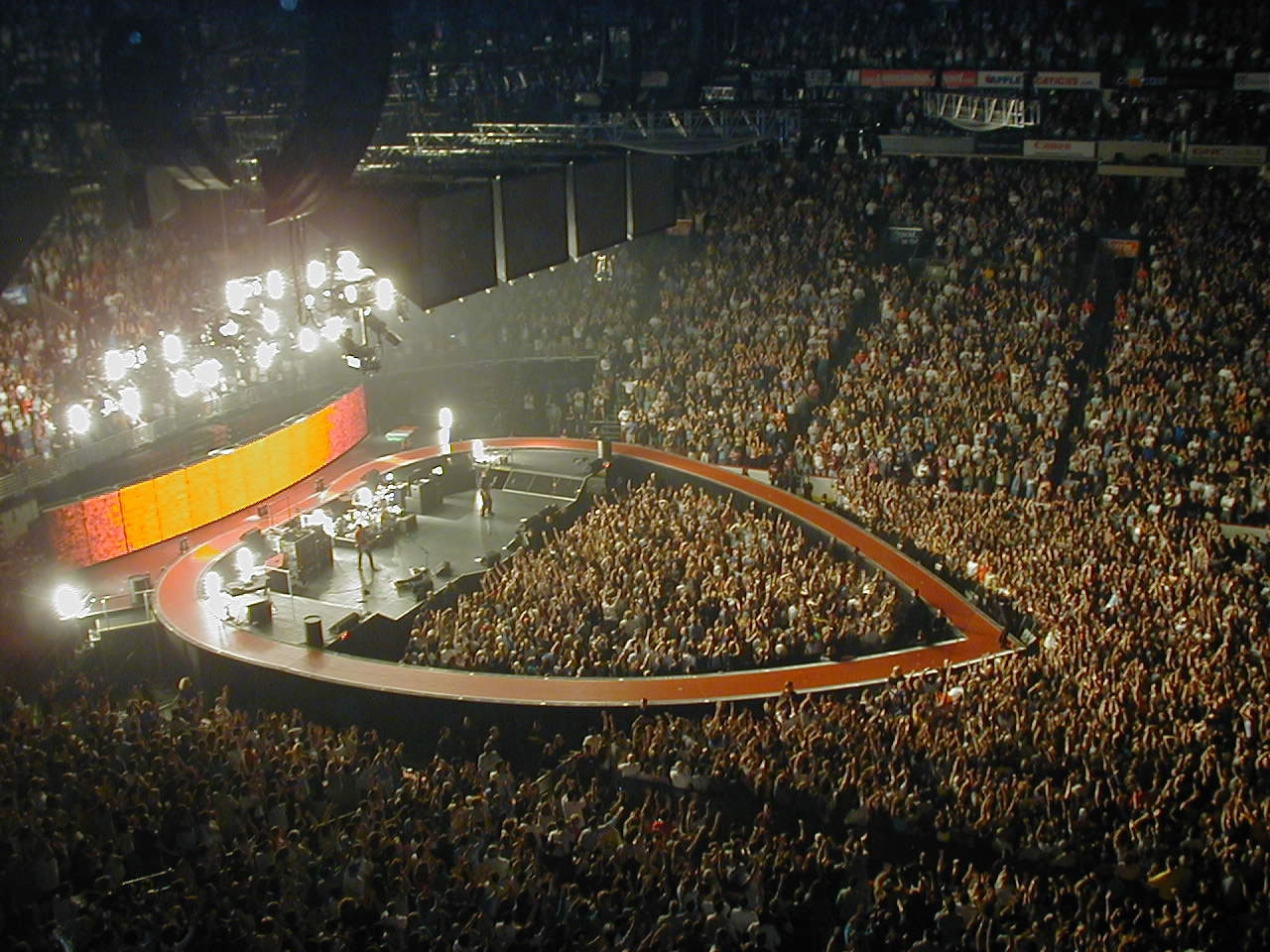
After the elaborate stadium productions of their previous two tours, U2's 2001 Elevation Tour was a scaled-down affair that featured a heart-shaped stage.

The band's 2001 Elevation Tour started in March, visiting North America and Europe across three legs. For the tour, U2 performed on a scaled-down stage, returning to arenas after nearly a decade of stadium productions. Mirroring the album's themes of "emotional contact, connection, and communication", the tour's set was designed to bring the group closer to their fans; a heart-shaped catwalk around the stage encircled many audience members, and festival seating was offered in the US for the first time in the group's history. During the tour, U2 headlined two Slane Concerts in Ireland, playing to crowds of 80,000. Following the September 11 attacks in the US, All That You Can't Leave Behind found added resonance with American audiences, as the album climbed in the charts and songs such as "Walk On" and "Peace on Earth" received radio airplay. In October, U2 performed at Madison Square Garden in New York City for the first time since the attacks. Bono and the Edge said these shows were among their most memorable and emotional performances. The Elevation Tour was the top-earning North American tour of 2001 with a gross of US$109.7 million, the second-highest amount ever at the time for a North American tour. Globally, it grossed US$143.5 million from 2.18 million tickets sold, making it the year's highest-grossing tour overall. Spin named U2 the "Band of the Year" for 2001, saying they had "schooled bands half their age about what a rock show could really accomplish".

On 3 February 2002, U2 performed during the Super Bowl XXXVI halftime show. In a tribute to those who died in the 11 September attacks, the victims' names were projected onto a backdrop, and at the end, Bono opened his jacket to reveal an American flag in the lining. Sports Illustrated, Rolling Stone, and USA Today ranked the band's performance as the best halftime show in Super Bowl history. Later that month, U2 received four additional Grammy Awards; All That You Can't Leave Behind won Best Rock Album, while "Walk On" was named Record of the Year, the first time an artist had won the award in consecutive years for songs from the same album. In November 2002, the band released their second compilation, The Best of 1990–2000, which featured several remixed 1990s songs and two new tracks, including the single "Electrical Storm".

=== How to Dismantle an Atomic Bomb and Vertigo Tour (2003–2006) ===
Looking for a harder-hitting rock sound than that of All That You Can't Leave Behind, U2 began recording their eleventh studio album, How to Dismantle an Atomic Bomb, in February 2003 with producer Chris Thomas. After nine months of work, the band had an album's worth of material ready for release, but they were not satisfied with the results; Mullen said that the songs "had no magic". The group subsequently enlisted Steve Lillywhite to take over as producer in Dublin in January 2004. Lillywhite, along with his assistant Jacknife Lee, spent six months with the band reworking songs and encouraging better performances. Several other producers received credits on the album, including Lanois, Eno, Flood, Carl Glanville, and Nellee Hooper; Bono acknowledged that the involvement of multiple producers affected the record's "sonic cohesion".

"Vertigo" (2004)
"Vertigo", which the Edge described as "visceral rock 'n' roll", became a hit worldwide and was used in a cross-promotion with Apple.

Released in November 2004, How to Dismantle an Atomic Bomb received favourable reviews from critics. The album featured lyrics touching on life, death, love, war, faith, and family. It reached number one in 30 countries, including the US, where first-week sales of 840,000 copies nearly doubled those of All That You Can't Leave Behind, setting a personal best for the band. Overall, it sold 9 million copies globally. For the album's release, U2 partnered with Apple for several cross-promotions: the first single, "Vertigo", was featured in a television advertisement for the company's iPod music player, while a U2-branded iPod and digital box set exclusive to the iTunes Store were released. "Vertigo" was an international hit, topping the charts in Ireland and the UK, and reaching number two in Canada and number five in Australia. The song won three Grammy Awards, including one for Best Rock Song. Other singles from the album were also hits; "Sometimes You Can't Make It on Your Own", written as a tribute to Bono's late father, went to number one in the UK and Canada, while "City of Blinding Lights" reached number two in both regions. In March 2005, U2 were inducted into the Rock and Roll Hall of Fame by Bruce Springsteen in their first year of eligibility. During his speech, Springsteen said the band had "beaten [the odds] by continuing to do their finest work and remaining at the top of their game and the charts for 25 years".

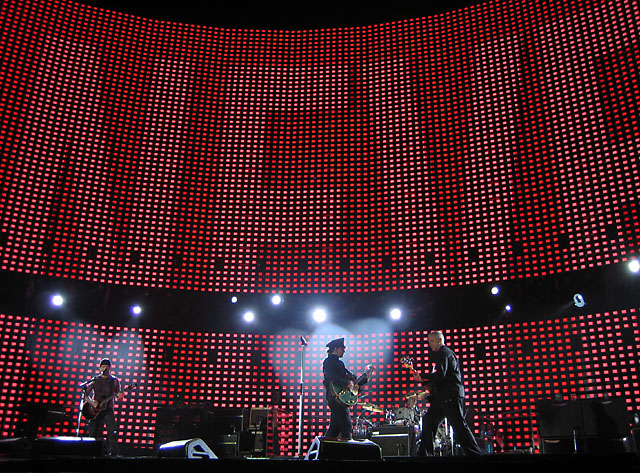
The outdoor stage of the Vertigo Tour, pictured in June 2005, featured a massive LED screen.

U2's 2005–2006 Vertigo Tour was preceded by several complications. A sudden illness afflicting the Edge's daughter nearly resulted in the tour's cancellation, before the group decided to adjust the tour schedule to accommodate her treatment. Additionally, ticket presales on the band's website were plagued with issues, as subscribing members encountered technical glitches and limited ticket availability, partially due to scalpers exploiting the system. Commencing in March 2005, the Vertigo Tour consisted of arena shows in North America and stadium shows internationally across five legs. The indoor stage replaced the heart-shaped ramp of the Elevation Tour with an elliptical one and featured retractable video curtains around the stage, while the stadium stage used a massive LED video screen. Setlists on tour varied more than in the group's past and included songs they had not played in decades. Like its predecessor, the Vertigo Tour was a commercial success, ranking as the top-earning tour of 2005 with US$260 million grossed.

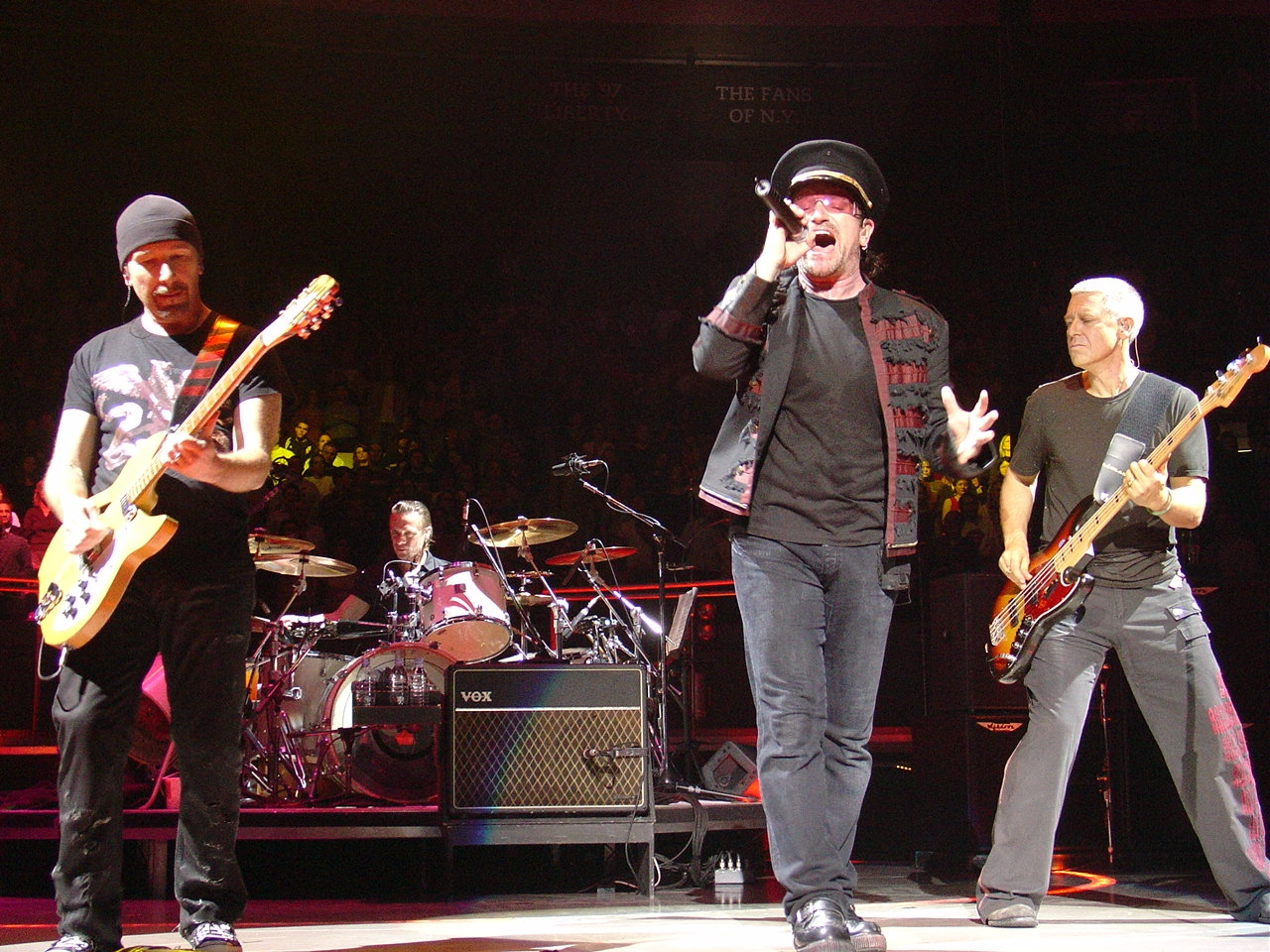
U2 performing at Madison Square Garden on 21 October 2005

In February 2006, U2 received five additional Grammy Awards, including Song of the Year for "Sometimes You Can't Make It on Your Own", and Best Rock Album and Album of the Year for How to Dismantle an Atomic Bomb; the awards made the album and its singles winners in all eight categories in which U2 were nominated, spanning two separate Grammy ceremonies. The group resumed the Vertigo Tour that month with a Latin American leg, on which several shows were filmed for the concert film U2 3D. It was released in theatres nearly two years later, and was the world's first live-action digital 3D film. In March, the band postponed the tour's remaining shows until the end of the year due to the health of the Edge's daughter. On 25 September 2006, U2 and Green Day performed at the Louisiana Superdome prior to an NFL football game, the New Orleans Saints' first home game in the city since Hurricane Katrina. The two bands covered the Skids' song "The Saints Are Coming" during the performance and for a benefit single, which reached number one in Australia and throughout Europe. U2 issued an official autobiography, U2 by U2, that month, followed in November by their third compilation album, U218 Singles. The Vertigo Tour concluded in December, having sold 4.6 million tickets and having earned US$389 million, the second-highest gross ever at the time.

In August 2006, the band incorporated its publishing business in the Netherlands following the capping of Irish artists' tax exemption at €250,000. The Edge stated that businesses often seek to minimise their tax burdens. The move was criticised in the Irish parliament. The band defended themselves, saying approximately 95% of their business took place outside Ireland, that they were taxed globally because of this, and that they were all "personal investors and employers in the country". Bono later said, "I think U2's tax business is our own business and I think it is not just to the letter of the law but to the spirit of the law."

=== No Line on the Horizon and U2 360° Tour (2006–2011) ===
Recording for U2's twelfth album, No Line on the Horizon, began with producer Rick Rubin in 2006, but the sessions were short-lived and the material was shelved. In May 2007, the group began new sessions with Brian Eno and Daniel Lanois in Fez, Morocco, involving the producers as full songwriting partners. Intending to write "future hymns"—songs that would be played forever—the group spent two weeks recording in a riad and exploring local music. The Edge called it "a very freeing experience" that "reminded [him] in many ways of early on and why [they] got into a band in the first place. Just that joy of playing." As recording on the album continued in New York, London, and Dublin, the band scaled back their experimental pursuits, which Eno said "sounded kind of synthetic" and were not easily married with the group's sound.

No Line on the Horizon was released in February 2009, more than four years after How to Dismantle an Atomic Bomb, the longest gap between albums of the band's career to that point. It received generally positive reviews, including their first five-star Rolling Stone review, but critics found it was not as experimental as originally billed. The album debuted at number one in over 30 countries, but its sales of 5 million were seen as a disappointment by U2 standards and it did not contain a hit single. Following the album's release, the band discussed tentative plans for a follow-up record entitled Songs of Ascent. Bono described the project as "a more meditative album on the theme of pilgrimage".

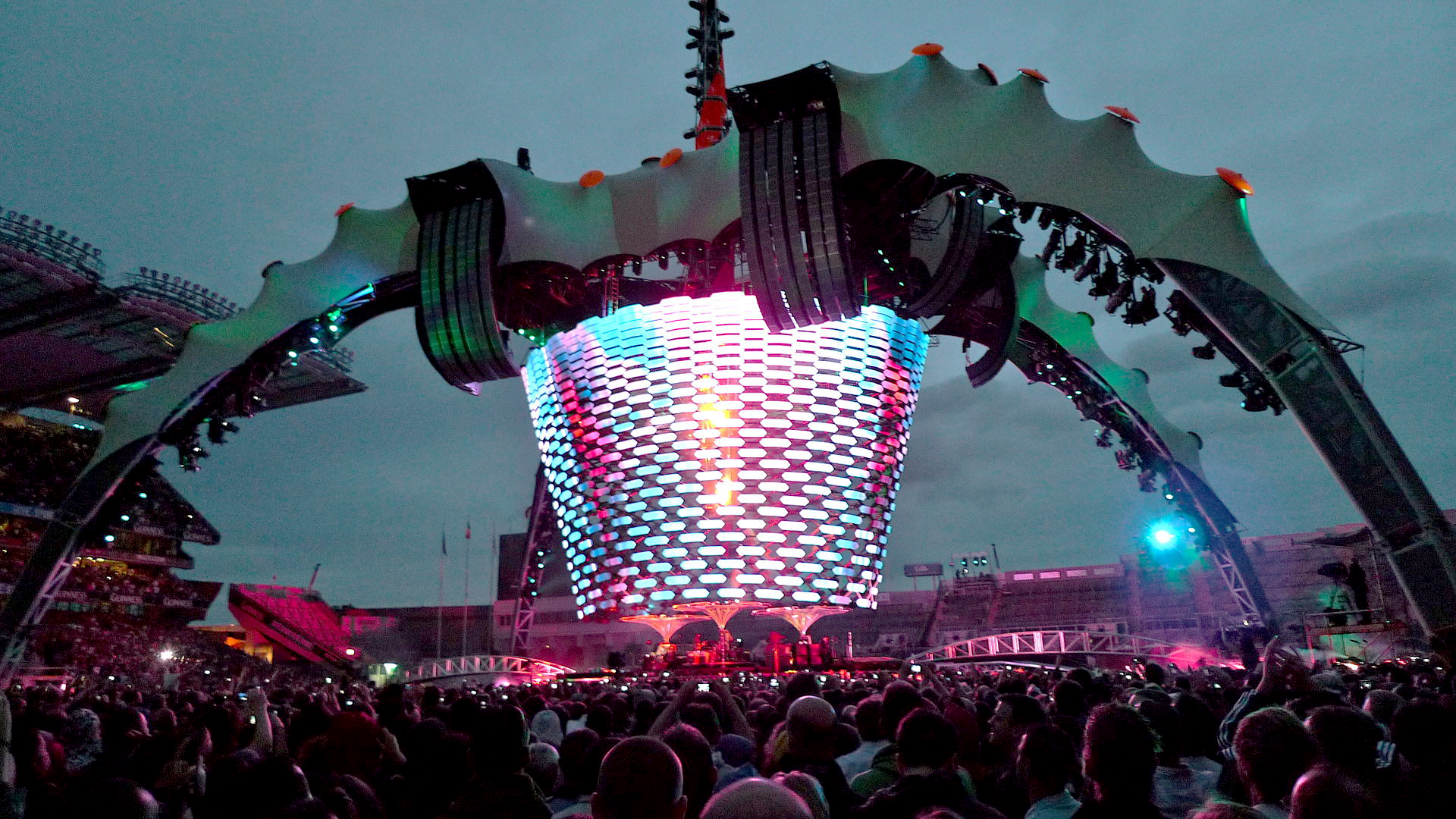
At 164 feet tall, the stage structure from the U2 360° Tour was the largest ever constructed. The tour became the highest-grossing in history, having earned US$736 million.

The group embarked on the U2 360° Tour in June 2009. It was their first live venture for Live Nation under a 12-year, US$100 million (£50 million) contract signed the year prior. As part of the deal, the company assumed control over U2's touring, merchandising, and official website. The 360° Tour concerts featured the band playing stadiums "in the round", allowing the audience to surround them on all sides. To accommodate the stage configuration, a large four-legged structure nicknamed "The Claw" was built above the stage, with the sound system and a cylindrical, expanding video screen on top of it. At 164 feet (50 m) tall, it was the largest stage ever constructed. The tour visited Europe and North America in 2009. On 25 October 2009, U2 set a new US record for single concert attendance for one headline act, performing to 97,014 people at the Rose Bowl in Pasadena. In May 2010, while rehearsing for the next leg of the tour, Bono suffered a herniated disk and severe compression of the sciatic nerve, requiring emergency back surgery. The band were forced to postpone the North American leg of the tour and a headlining performance at the Glastonbury Festival 2010 until the following year. After Bono's recovery, U2 resumed the 360° Tour in August 2010 with legs in Europe, Australia, and New Zealand, during which they began to play new, unreleased songs live. By its conclusion in July 2011, U2 360° had set records for the highest-grossing concert tour (US$736 million) and most tickets sold for a tour (7.3 million).

=== Songs of Innocence and Innocence + Experience Tour (2011–2015) ===
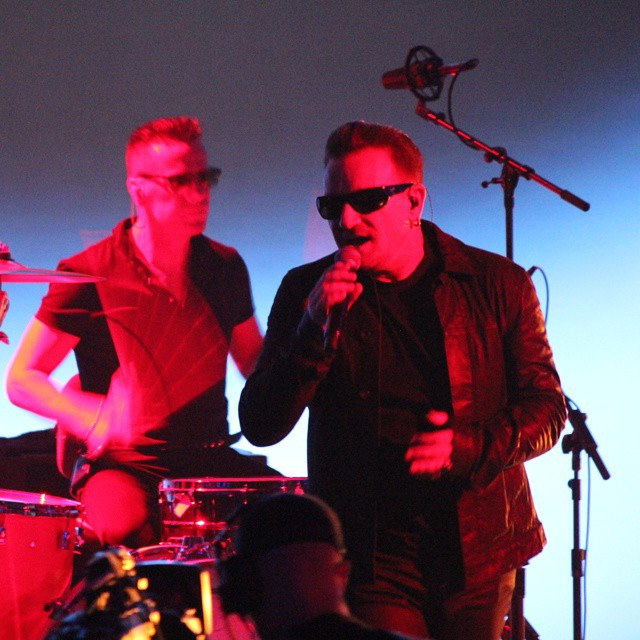
U2 performing at the Apple product launch at which Songs of Innocence was announced in September 2014

Throughout the 360° Tour, the band worked on multiple projects, including a rock album produced by Danger Mouse, a dance record produced by RedOne and will.i.am, and Songs of Ascent. The latter was not completed to their satisfaction, and by December 2011, Clayton admitted it would not come to fruition. The sessions with Danger Mouse formed the foundation of U2's next album, and they worked with him until May 2013 before enlisting the help of producers Paul Epworth, Ryan Tedder, Declan Gaffney, and Flood. The band suspended work on the album late in 2013 to contribute a new song, "Ordinary Love", to the film Mandela: Long Walk to Freedom. The track, written in honour of Nelson Mandela, won the 2014 Golden Globe Award for Best Original Song. In November 2013, U2's manager Paul McGuinness stepped down as part of a deal with Live Nation to acquire his management firm, Principle Management. McGuinness, who had managed the group for over 30 years, was succeeded by Guy Oseary. In February 2014, the single "Invisible", debuted in a Super Bowl television advertisement and was made available in the iTunes Store at no cost to launch a partnership with Product Red and Bank of America to fight AIDS. Bono called the track a "sneak preview" of their pending record.

On 9 September 2014, U2 appeared at an Apple product launch event to make a surprise announcement of their thirteenth studio album, Songs of Innocence. They released it digitally the same day to all iTunes Store customers at no cost, making it available to over 500 million people in what Apple CEO Tim Cook called "the largest album release of all time". Apple reportedly paid Universal Music Group and U2 a lump sum for a five-week exclusivity period in which to distribute the album and spent US$100 million on a promotional campaign. Songs of Innocence recalls the group members' youth in Ireland, touching on childhood experiences, loves and losses, while paying tribute to their musical inspirations. Bono described it as "the most personal album we've written". The record received mixed reviews and was criticised for its digital release strategy; it was automatically added to users' iTunes accounts, which for many, triggered an unprompted download to their electronic devices that was difficult to delete. Chris Richards of The Washington Post called the release "rock-and-roll as dystopian junk mail". The group's press tour for the album was interrupted after Bono was seriously injured in a bicycle accident in Central Park on 16 November 2014. He suffered fractures of his shoulder blade, humerus, orbit, and pinky finger, leading to uncertainty that he would ever be able to play guitar again.

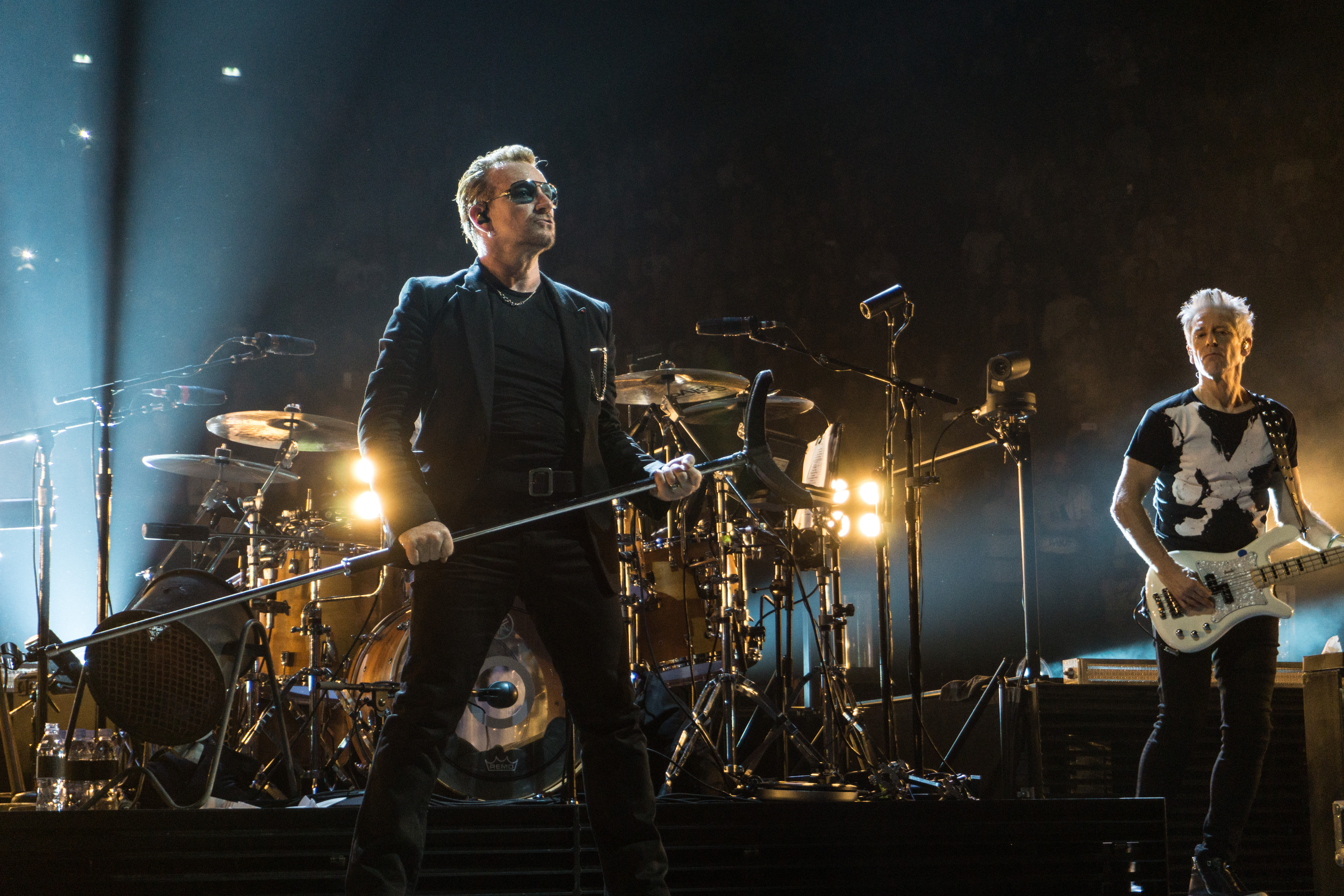
U2 performing in Paris on 7 December 2015, the final date of the Innocence + Experience Tour. It was filmed for an HBO-broadcast concert video.

Following Bono's recuperation, U2 embarked on the Innocence + Experience Tour in May 2015, visiting arenas in North America and Europe from May to December. The group structured their concerts around a loose autobiographical narrative of "innocence" passing into "experience", with a fixed set of songs for the first half of each show and a varying second half, separated by an intermission—a first for U2 concerts. The stage spanned the length of the venue floor and had three sections: a rectangular main stage, a smaller circular B-stage, and a connecting walkway. The centrepiece of the set was a 96-foot-long (29 m) double-sided video screen that featured an interior catwalk, allowing the band members to perform amidst the video projections. U2's sound system was moved to the venue ceilings and arranged in an oval array to improve the sound. The tour grossed US$152.2 million from 1.29 million tickets sold. The final date of the tour, one of two Paris shows rescheduled due to the 13 November 2015 attacks in the city, was filmed for the video Innocence + Experience: Live in Paris and broadcast on the American television network HBO.

=== The Joshua Tree anniversary tours and Songs of Experience (2016–2019) ===
In 2016, U2 worked on their next studio album, Songs of Experience, a companion piece to Songs of Innocence. The group had mostly completed the album and planned to release it that year, but after the shift of global politics in a conservative direction, highlighted by the UK's Brexit referendum and the 2016 US presidential election, they put the record on hold to reassess its tone. The group spent the extra time rewriting lyrics, rearranging and remixing songs, and pursuing different production styles. Further impacting the lyrical direction of the album was a "brush with mortality" that Bono experienced; in December 2016, he underwent open-heart surgery due to an aortic aneurysm that formed over time as a result of having a bicuspid aortic valve.

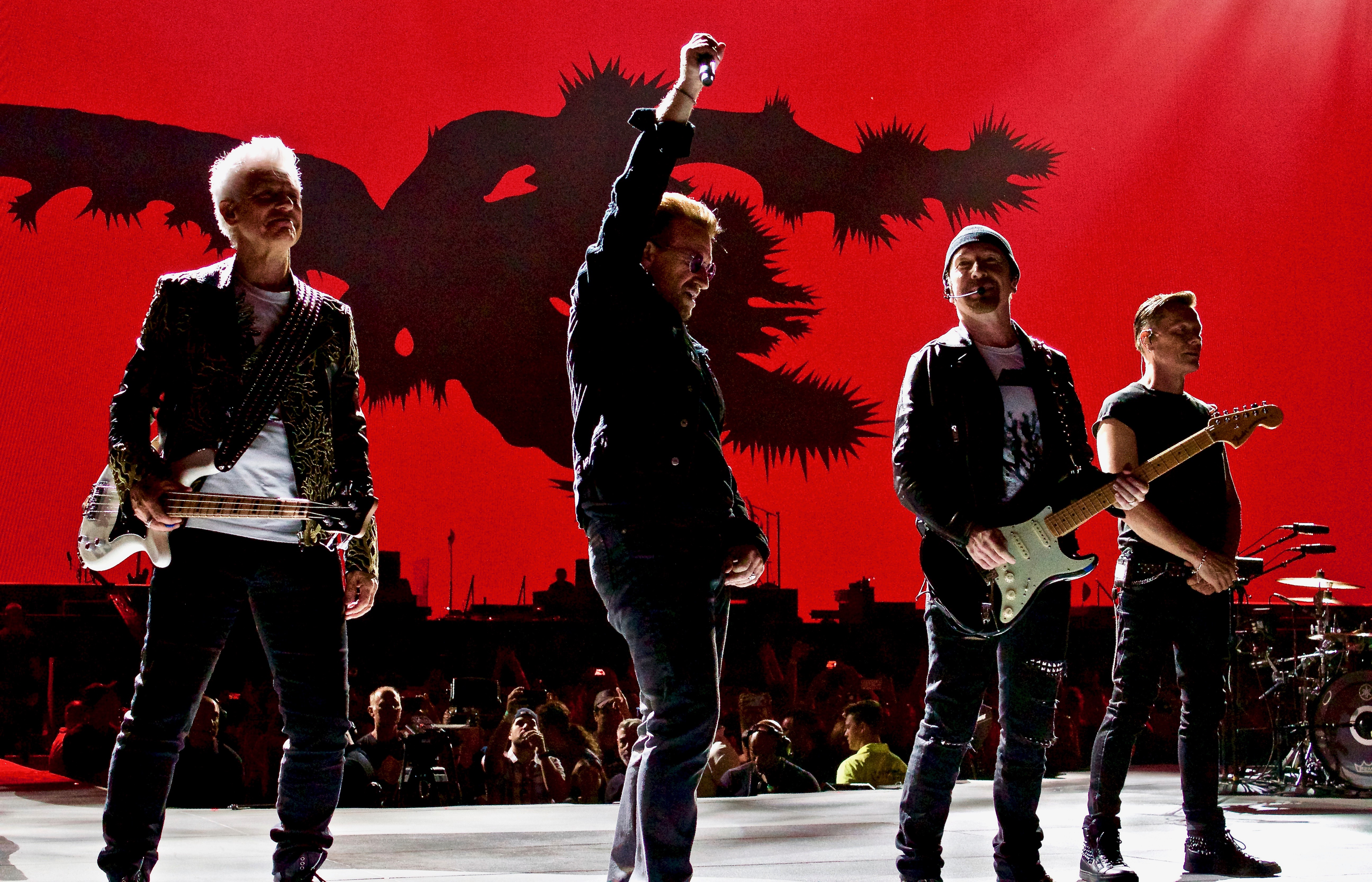
The Joshua Tree Tour 2017 commemorated the 30th anniversary of the eponymous record. It was the highest-grossing tour of the year, earning US$316 million.

U2 toured in 2017 to commemorate the 30th anniversary of The Joshua Tree, with each show featuring a performance of the entire album. It was the first time the group toured in promotion of an album from their back catalogue. The Edge cited the same world events that caused the group to delay Songs of Experience for what he judged to be renewed resonance of The Joshua Tree's subject matter and a reason to revisit it. The tour's stage featured a 7.6K video screen measuring 200 ft × 45 ft (61 m × 14 m) that was, according to The Guardian, the largest and highest resolution screen used on a concert tour. The tour included a headlining appearance at the Bonnaroo Music Festival in June. The tour grossed more than US$316 million from over 2.7 million tickets sold, making it the highest-grossing tour of the year.

Songs of Experience was released on 1 December 2017. Lyrically, the album reflects the "political and personal apocalypse" that Bono felt in 2016. The first single, "You're the Best Thing About Me", is one of several songs from the record for which Bono wrote the lyrics as letters addressed to people and places closest to his heart. Songs of Experience received mixed reviews from critics; it was the sixth-best-selling album globally in 2017 with 1.3 million copies sold.

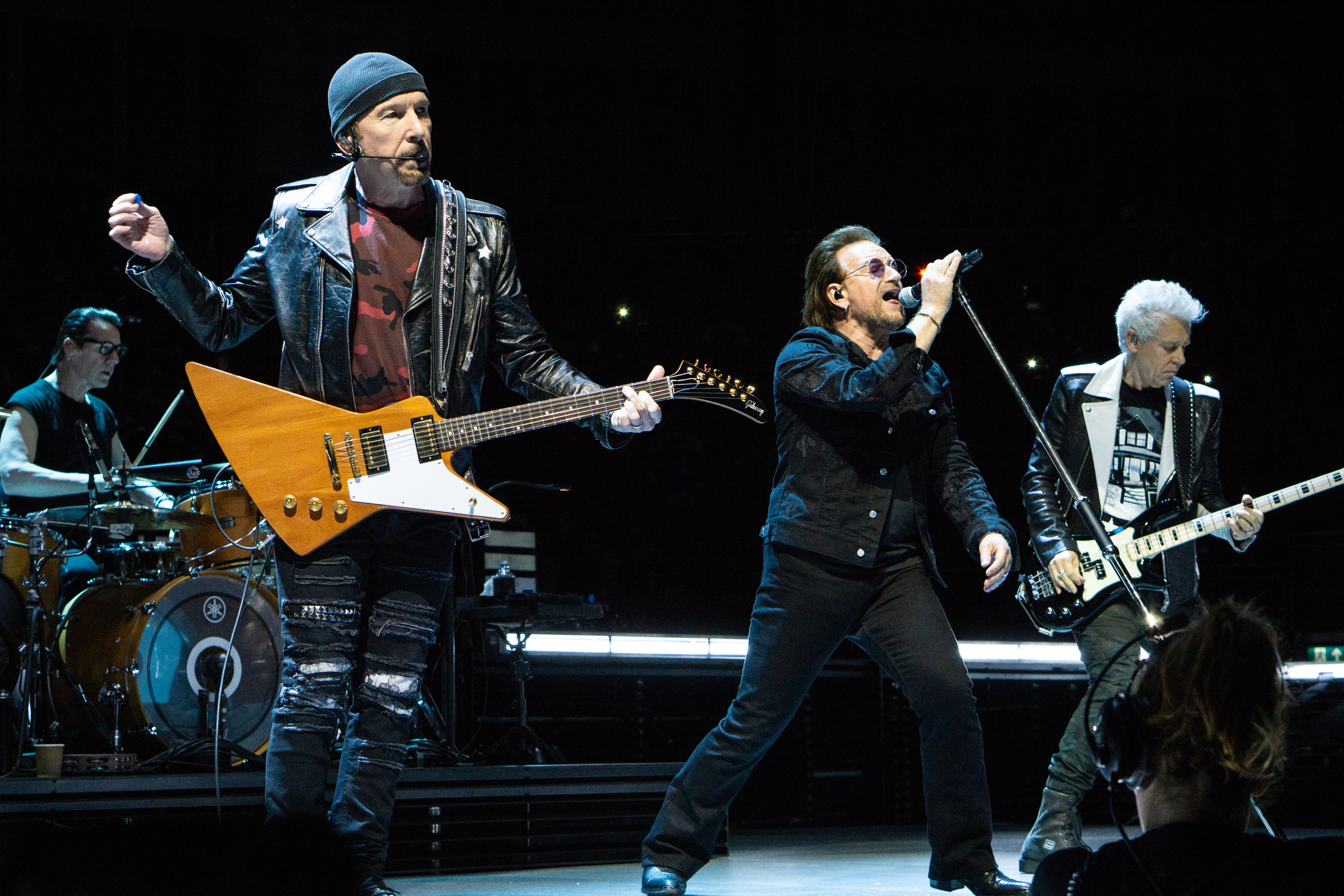
U2 performing in London in October 2018 during the Experience + Innocence Tour, a sequel to their 2015 tour

In May 2018, the band embarked on the Experience + Innocence Tour, which consisted of arena shows across North America and Europe. It was a sequel to their 2015 Innocence + Experience Tour, reprising its loose narrative and using a similar stage set. Several enhancements were made, such as a higher resolution and more transparent video screen and the addition of LED panels to the B-stage floor. The band incorporated augmented reality into the shows, releasing a mobile app for concertgoers to use and reviving Bono's demonic stage character MacPhisto from the 1993 Zoo TV Tour with the help of a camera filter. The tour concluded in Berlin in November with total revenues of US$126.2 million from 924,000 tickets sold, according to Billboard.

U2's Joshua Tree anniversary concert tour visited Oceania and Asia in 2019, their first time playing Australia and New Zealand since the 360° Tour in 2010, and their first time performing in South Korea, Singapore, India, and the Philippines. The band released the single "Ahimsa" with Indian musician A.R. Rahman to promote their December concert in India. The group's 2019 shows grossed US$73.8 million and sold 567,000 tickets, bringing the cumulative totals for their Joshua Tree anniversary tours to US$390.8 million grossed and 3.3 million tickets sold.

=== Songs of Surrender and concert residency at Sphere (2020–2025) ===
Over a two-year period during lockdowns for the COVID-19 pandemic, the group worked on Songs of Surrender, an album of re-recorded and reinterpreted versions of 40 songs from their back catalogue. Largely the effort of the Edge and Bono, the album was recorded with collaborators that included Bob Ezrin, Duncan Stewart, Declan Gaffney, and Stjepan Hauser. The reimagined songs feature stripped-down and acoustic arrangements, in different keys and tempos and often with re-written lyrics. The project was conceived as a companion to Bono's memoir Surrender: 40 Songs, One Story.

In October 2022, several media outlets reported that U2 were in discussions to sign with Irving Azoff and his son Jeffrey of Full Stop Management, following the end of Guy Oseary's nine-year tenure as the band's manager.

After releasing his memoir in November 2022, Bono embarked on a book tour that month called "Stories of Surrender", initially consisting of 14 dates across North America and Europe. During the shows, Bono performed U2 songs in stripped-down arrangements mirroring those from Songs of Surrender. The record was released in March 2023. It was the group's first number-one album in the UK since 2009, but sales quickly tapered off; it charted in the UK for three weeks, and in the US for one week after reaching number five. The album's release coincided with a television documentary film, Bono & The Edge: A Sort of Homecoming, With Dave Letterman, that premiered on Disney+. In April, Bono resumed his "Stories of Surrender" book tour with an 11-show residency at the Beacon Theatre in New York City.

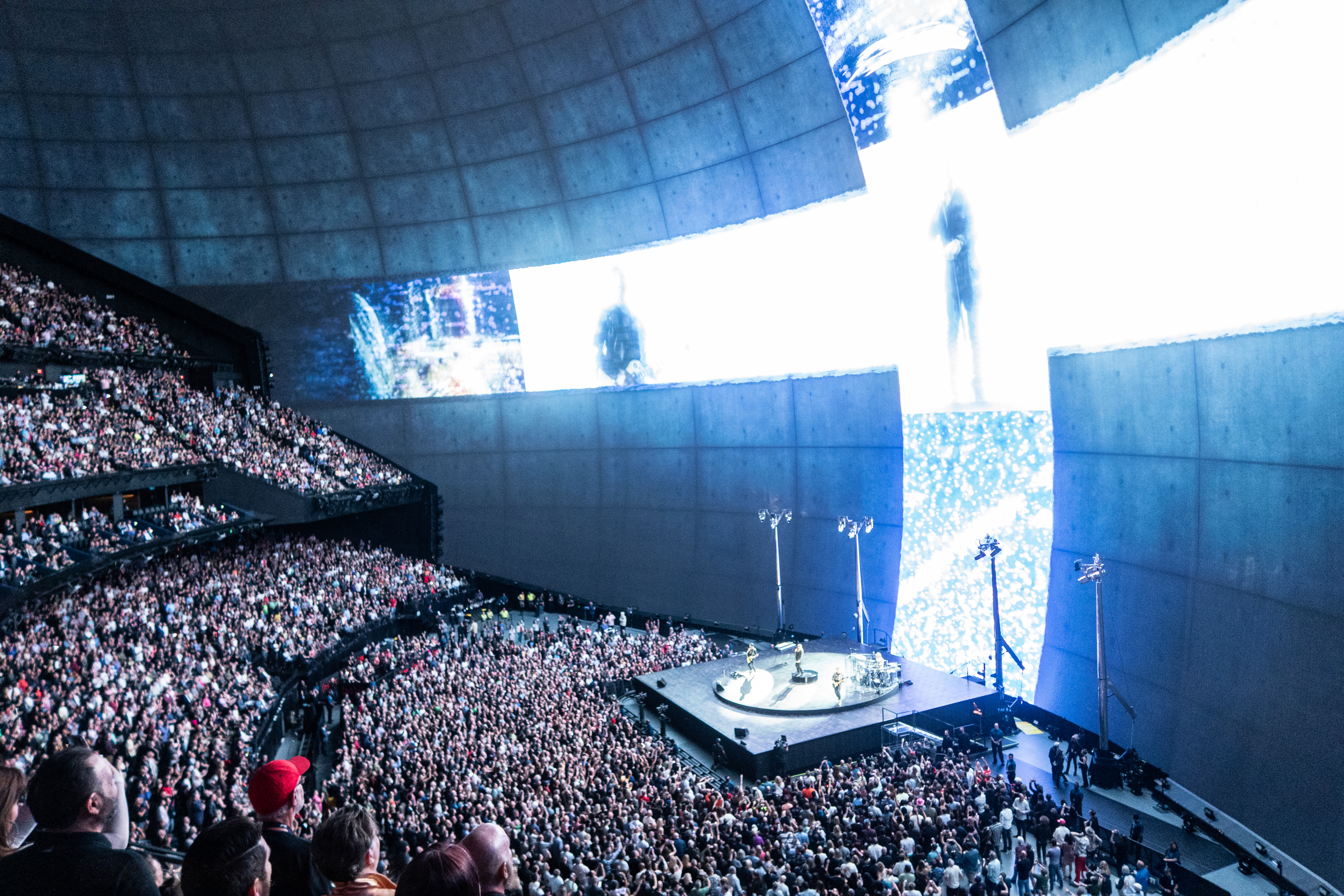
U2 during a September 2023 show at Sphere, as part of a 40-date concert residency to inaugurate the venue

From September 2023 to March 2024, U2 staged a 40-date concert residency called U2:UV Achtung Baby Live to inaugurate Sphere in the Las Vegas Valley. The residency was announced during a Super Bowl LVII television advertisement. Performances were focused on the group's 1991 album Achtung Baby and leveraged the venue's immersive video and sound capabilities, which include a 16K resolution wraparound LED screen and speakers with beamforming and wave field synthesis technologies. Mullen did not participate in the concerts in order to recuperate from surgery, marking the first time since 1978 that U2 performed without him; Dutch drummer Bram van den Berg from the band Krezip filled in. Coinciding with the beginning of the residency, the group released the Las Vegas-inspired single "Atomic City".

U2:UV Achtung Baby Live was highly acclaimed by critics; Rolling Stone's Andy Greene called it "a quantum leap forward for concerts", and Neil McCormick of The Telegraph said it would "change live entertainment forever". The residency grossed US$244.5 million from 663,000 tickets sold, making it the fourth-highest-grossing concert residency of all time. It was filmed for the immersive concert film V-U2, which began screening exclusively at Sphere in September 2024.

=== Days of Ash and Easter Lily EPs and Carnaval de Luz (2026–present) ===
In early 2026, U2 surprise released a pair of six-track EPs to bookend the Lent season: Days of Ash in February on Ash Wednesday, and Easter Lily in April on Good Friday. They were the group's first collections of newly written songs since Songs of Experience in 2017, and they marked Mullen's return to the band after his absence from their Sphere residency. Days of Ash included protest songs addressing the killings of Minneapolis woman Renée Good, Iranian teenager Sarina Esmailzadeh, and Palestinian activist Awdah Hathaleen, while by contrast, Easter Lily featured lyrical themes of friendship, loss, faith, and renewal.

In the lead-up to their 16th album Carnaval de Luz, the group released four singles: the album tracks "Street of Dreams", "Silencio", and "The Greatest Show on Earth", and the Martin Garrix collaboration "Fireflies". On 25 September, the day after announcing the album, U2 commemorated the 50th anniversary of their first practice with performances at their alma mater Mount Temple Comprehensive School and from the balcony of Bewley's Cafe on Grafton Street.

In February 2027, U2 are scheduled to commence the Greatest Show on Earth World Tour, which will visit Latin America and Europe.

== Musical style ==
Bono's songwriting exhibits a penchant for social, political, and personal subject matter, while maintaining a grandiosity. The Edge has described U2 as a fundamentally live band. U2's early sound was punk-influenced alternative rock, and the group were associated with the post-punk movement. Their influences included acts such as Television, Siouxsie and the Banshees, and Joy Division, and their resulting sound was described as containing a "sense of exhilaration" that resulted from the Edge's "radiant chords" and Bono's "ardent vocals". According to Bob Stanley, "U2 rejected post-punk's own rejection of pop as lingua franca, its hunkering down in regional particularity, and its raised finger to populist communication." U2 were initially labelled by some critics as neo-psychedelia or psychedelic rock, receiving comparisons to groups such as the Teardrop Explodes, the Psychedelic Furs, and Echo & the Bunnymen from Newsday, The Boston Globe, and the Chicago Tribune.

U2 developed a melodic sound under the early influence of record producer Steve Lillywhite at a time when they were not known for musical proficiency. Their songs began as minimalistic and uncomplicated instrumentals heard on Boy and October, before evolving with War to include aspects of rock anthem, funk, and dance rhythms to become more versatile and aggressive. Boy and War were labelled "muscular and assertive" by Rolling Stone, influenced in large part by Lillywhite's production. The Unforgettable Fire, which began with the Edge playing more keyboards than guitars, as well as follow-up The Joshua Tree, were produced by Brian Eno and Daniel Lanois. With their influence, both albums achieved a "diverse texture". The songs from The Joshua Tree and Rattle and Hum placed more emphasis on Lanois-inspired rhythm as they mixed distinct and varied styles of gospel and blues music, which stemmed from the band's fascination with America.

In the 1990s, U2 began using synthesisers, distortion, and electronic beats derived from noise music, dance, and hip-hop on Achtung Baby, Zooropa, and Pop. According to Stephen Thomas Erlewine, "U2 was able to sustain their popularity in the '90s by reinventing themselves as a post-modern, self-consciously ironic dance-inflected pop rock act, owing equally to the experimentalism of late '70s Bowie and '90s electronic dance and techno". They have also been called a pop-rock band by biographer Michael Heatley and musicologist Gerry Smyth. The band's 1990s output has been regarded as an art rock phase in commentaries by biographer John Jobling, Salon journalist Nico Lang, and music critic Jim DeRogatis, as well as in an interview by Bono. Time magazine's Josh Tyrangiel went further in saying that, "In the towering period that spanned The Joshua Tree to Zooropa, U2 made stadium-size art rock with huge melodies that allowed Bono to throw his arms around the world while bending its ear about social justice."

In the 2000s, U2 returned to more stripped-down rock and pop sounds, with more conventional rhythms and reduced usage of synthesisers and effects, "reinvent[ing] themselves as a quality pop band", according to music journalist Chris Charlesworth. U2's music has been regarded as pop in analyses by writers David Hawke, Robert Christgau, and Niall Stokes. In an interview with Stokes for Hot Press, Bono explained the band's struggles in the 1980s among highbrow circles who patronised them for being a successful pop group, leading to their embrace of the term "pop" by the 1990s. Reviewing their 2000 album All That You Can't Leave Behind, Christgau remarked that, "since they'd been calling themselves pop for half of their two-decade run, maybe they'd better sit down and write some catchy songs. So they did." Summing up U2's stylistic evolution since Boy, Guitar journalist Owen Bailey said that they "have gone on to conquer the world's airwaves and arenas in a number of different incarnations, ranging from earnest, politically charged new-wave flagbearers to wide-eyed art-rock musicologists to purveyors of irony-laden alt-rock and ever onward", with the Edge remaining "at the heart of their sound".

=== Vocals ===
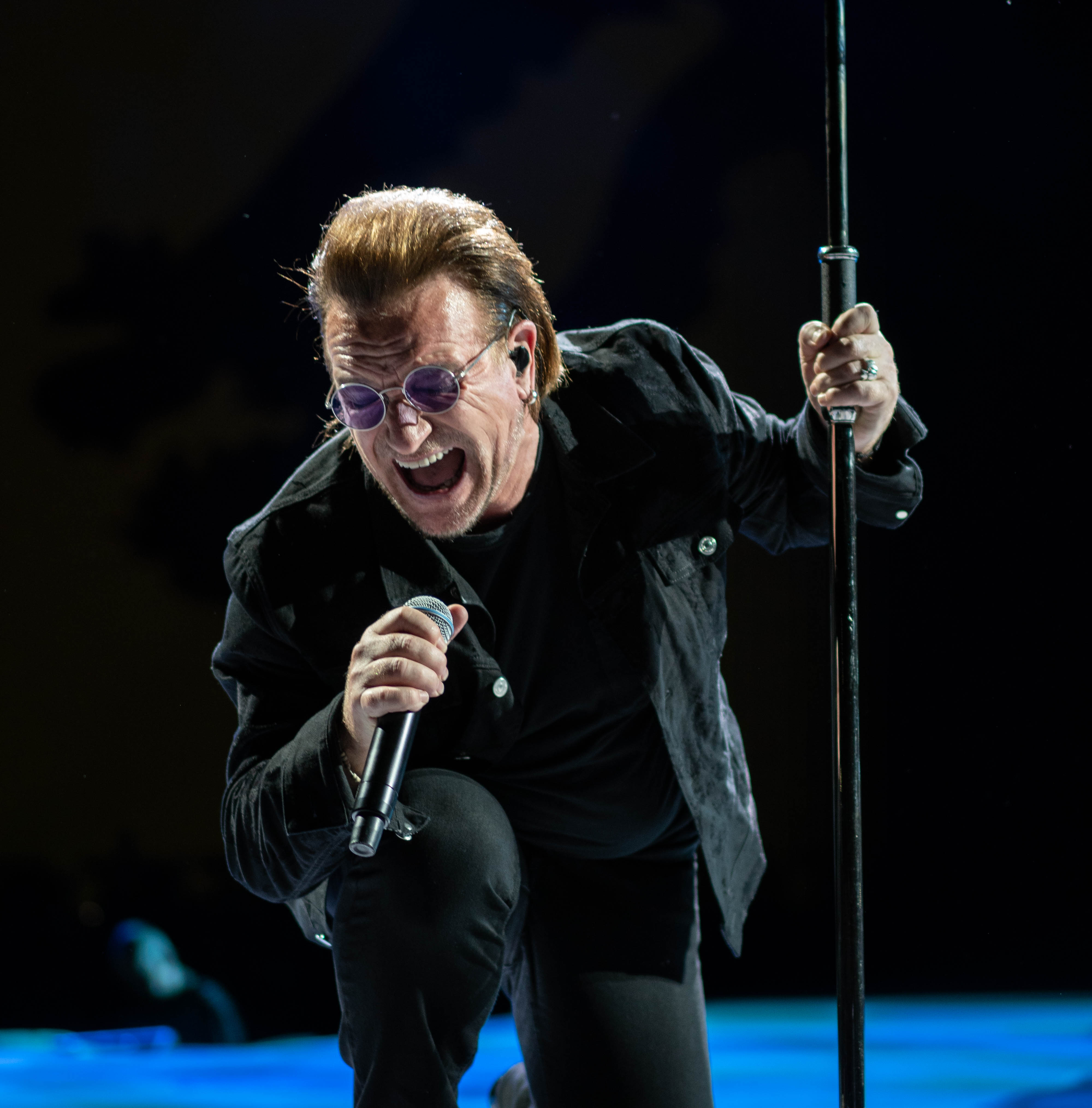
Bono performing in Amsterdam in July 2017

Bono is known for his impassioned vocal style, often delivered in a high register through open-throated belting. He has been classified as a tenor, and according to him has a three-octave vocal range; one analysis found it to span from C♯_{2} to G♯_{5} on studio recordings over the course of his career. He frequently employs "whoa-oh-oh" vocalisations in his singing. Rock musician Billie Joe Armstrong of Green Day said: "He's a physical singer, like the leader of a gospel choir, and he gets lost in the melodic moment. He goes to a place outside himself, especially in front of an audience, when he hits those high notes." He added that Bono is "not afraid to go beyond what he's capable of".

In the early years of U2, Bono unintentionally developed an English vocal accent as a result of him mimicking his musical influences such as Siouxsie and the Banshees. "I still think that I sing like Siouxsie from The Banshees on the first two U2 albums. But I found my voice through Joey Ramone at that gig in Dublin. I... heard him singing. He sang a bit like a girl too... That was my way in." Bono's vocal style evolved during the band's exploration of roots music for The Joshua Tree; Spin said that he learned to command "the full whisper-to-shout range of blues mannerisms". Bono attributed this maturation to "loosening up", "discover[ing] other voices", and employing more restraint in his singing. For "Where the Streets Have No Name", he varied the timbre of his voice extensively and used rubato to vary its timing, while author Susan Fast found "With or Without You" to be the first track on which he "extended his vocal range downward in an appreciable way".

Bono continued to explore a lower range in the 1990s, using what Fast described as "breathy and subdued colors" for Achtung Baby. One technique used on the album is octave doubling, in which his vocals are sung in two different octaves, either simultaneously or alternating between verses and choruses. According to Fast, this technique introduces "a contrasting lyrical idea and vocal character to deliver it", leading to both literal and ironic interpretations of Bono's vocals. On tracks such as "Zoo Station" and "The Fly", his vocals were highly processed, giving them a different emotional feel from his previous work. Bono said that lowering his voice helped him find a new vocal vocabulary, which he felt was limited to "certain words and tones" by his tenor voice. His singing on Zooropa was an even further departure from U2's previous style; throughout the record, Bono "underplay[ed] his lung power", according to Jon Pareles, and he also used an operatic falsetto he calls the "Fat Lady" voice on the tracks "Lemon" and "Numb". As he has aged, Bono has continued to evolve his singing, relying more on "the croon than the belt", according to Rolling Stone's Joe Gross.

=== Guitar ===
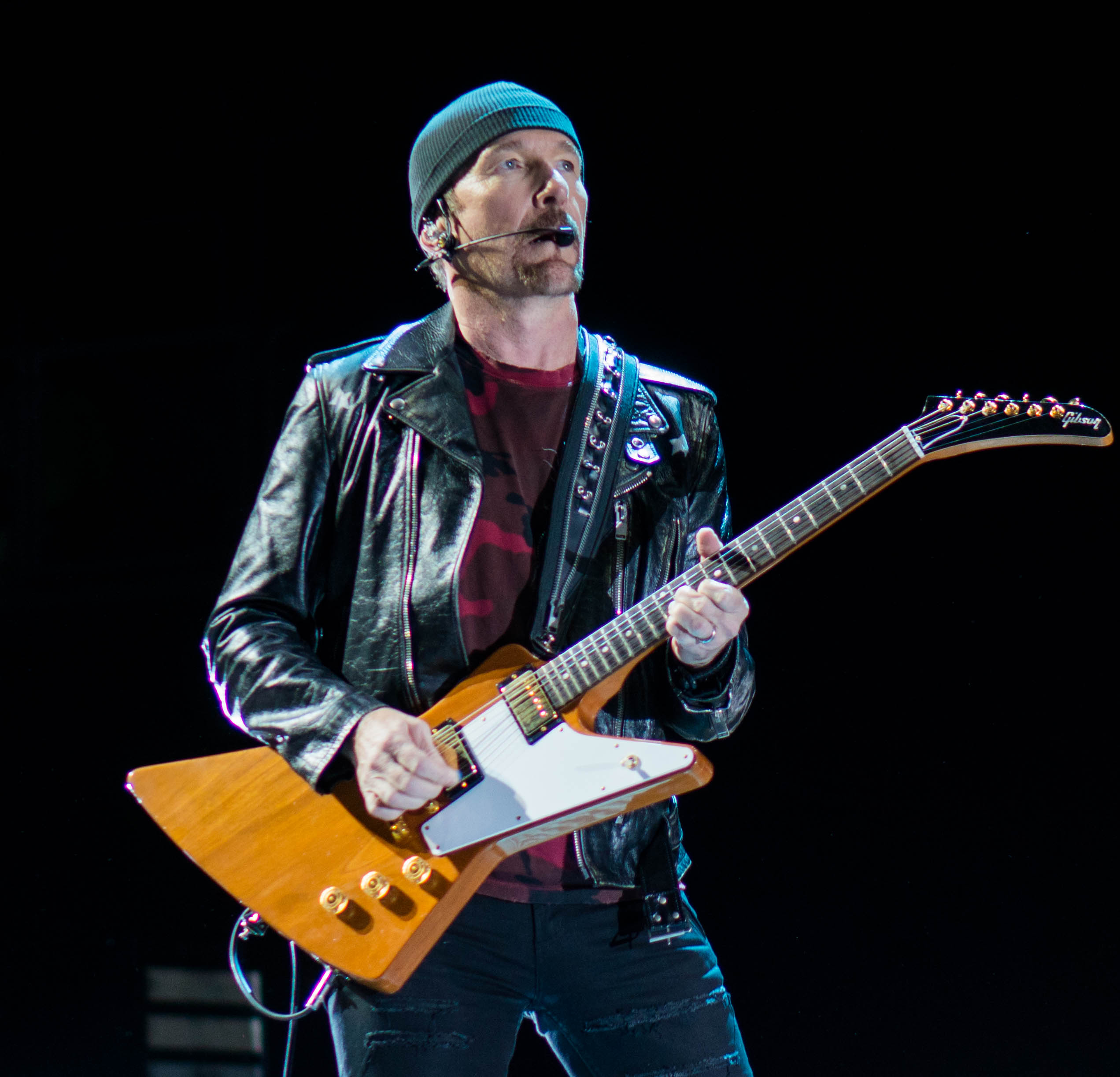
The Edge playing his signature guitar, the Gibson Explorer

The Edge's style of playing guitar is distinguished by his chiming timbres, echoing notes, sparse voicings, and extensive use of effects units. He favours the perfect fifth interval and often plays power chords, which are chords consisting of just the fifth and root notes without the third. This style is not explicitly in a minor or major key, but implies both, creating a musical ambiguity. For these chords, he often plays the same notes on multiple strings, some of which are left open, creating an Irish-influenced drone. Against this drone, he changes other notes to imply a harmony. Among the Edge's signature techniques are playing arpeggios, sixteenth note percussive strumming, and harmonics, the latter of which he described as "so pure and finely-focused that [they have] the incredible ability to pierce through [their] environment of sound, just like lightning". His approach to guitar playing is relatively understated and eschews virtuosity in favour of "atmospherics, subtlety, minimalism, and clever signal processing". Rather than emulate common playing styles, the Edge is interested in "tearing up the rule book" and finding new ways to approach the instrument. He cited guitarists such as Tom Verlaine of Television, John McKay of Siouxsie and the Banshees, John McGeoch, Rory Gallagher, and Patti Smith as some of his strongest influences.

The Edge's guitar sound is frequently modulated with a delay set to a dotted eighth note for rhythmic effect. After acquiring his first delay pedal, the Electro-Harmonix Memory Man, he became fascinated with how to use its return echo to "fill in notes that [he's] not playing, like two guitar players rather than one". The effect unit became a mainstay in his guitar rig and had a significant impact on the band's creative output. The Edge became known for his extensive use of effects units, and for his meticulous nature in crafting specific sounds and guitar tones from his equipment choices. Led Zeppelin guitarist Jimmy Page called him a "sonic architect", while Neil McCormick described him as an "effects maestro". Critics have variously referred to the Edge's guitar sounds as evoking the image of fighter planes on "Bullet the Blue Sky", resembling a "dentist's drill" on "Love Is Blindness", and resembling an "airplane turbine" on "Mofo". The Edge said that rather than using effects merely to modify his sound, he uses them to spark ideas during his songwriting process.

The Edge developed his playing style during his teenage years, partially as a result of him and Mullen trying to accommodate the "eccentric" bass playing of Clayton by being the timekeepers of the band. In their early days, the Edge's only guitar was his 1976 Gibson Explorer Limited Edition, which became a signature of the group. He found the sound of the Explorer's bass strings unsatisfactory and avoided them in his playing early on, resulting in a trebly sound. He said by focusing "on one area of the fretboard [he] was developing a very stylized way of doing something that someone else would play in a normal way". His 1964 Vox AC30 "Top Boost" amplifier (housed in a 1970s cabinet) is favoured for its "sparkle" tone, and is the basis for his sound both in the studio and live. Rather than hold his plectrum with a standard grip, the Edge turns it sideways or upside down to use the dimpled edge against the strings, producing a "rasping top end" to his tone.

=== Rhythm section ===
As a rhythm section, Mullen and Clayton often play the same patterns, giving U2's music a driving, pulsating beat that serves as a foundation for the Edge's guitar work. For his drumming, Mullen locks into the Edge's guitar playing, while Clayton locks his bass playing into Mullen's drumming. Author Bill Flanagan said that their playing styles perfectly reflected their personalities: "Larry is right on top of the beat, a bit ahead—as you'd expect from a man who's so ordered and punctual in his life. Adam plays a little behind the beat, waiting till the last moment to slip in, which fits Adam's casual, don't-sweat-it personality."

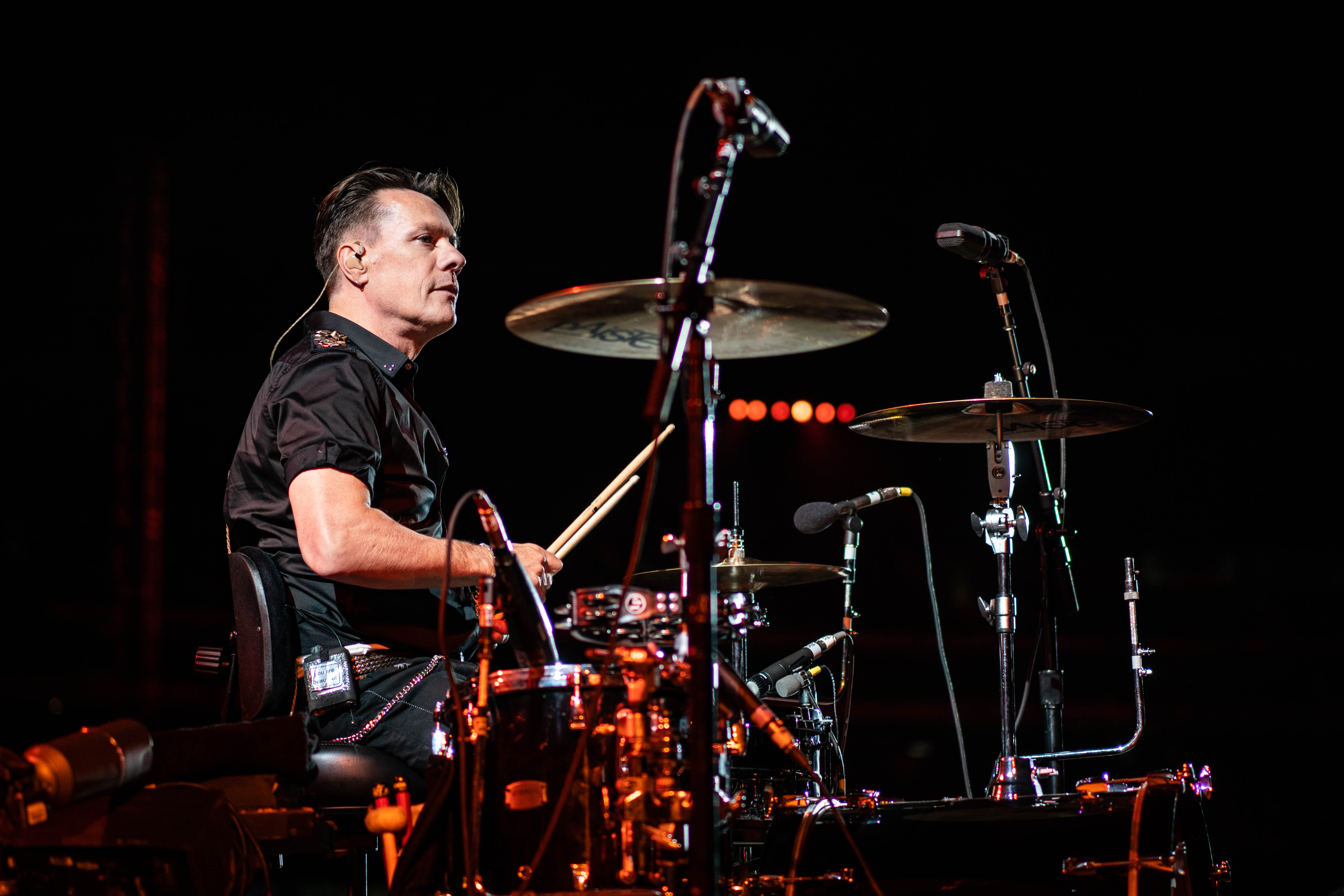
Mullen in November 2019

Mullen's drumming style is influenced by his experience in marching bands during his adolescence, which helped contribute to the militaristic beats of songs such as "Sunday Bloody Sunday". Flanagan said that he plays "with a martial rigidity but uses his kit in a way a properly trained drummer would not"; he tends to transition from the snare drum onto tom-toms positioned on either side of him, contrasting with how they are traditionally used. Mullen occasionally rides a tom-tom the way other drummers would play a cymbal, or rides the hi-hat how others would play a snare. He admitted his bass drum technique is not a strength, as he mostly played the snare in marching bands and did not learn to properly combine the separate drumming elements together on a full kit. As a result, he uses a floor tom to his left to create the effect of a bass drum. He said, "I couldn't do what most people would consider a normal beat for the song, so I chose alternatives." He was heavily influenced by glam rock acts of the 1970s when first learning to play. In the early days of U2, Mullen had what Bono called a "florid" drumming style, before he pared down his rhythms. His drumming leaves open space, owing to what Modern Drummer described as his understanding of "when to hit and when not to hit". As he matured as a timekeeper, he developed an excellent sense of rhythm; Eno recounted one occasion when Mullen noticed that his click track had been set incorrectly by six milliseconds. Under the tutelage of Lanois, Mullen learned more about his musical role as the drummer in filling out the band's sound, while Flood helped him learn to play along with electronic elements such as drum machines and samples. His kit has a tambourine mounted on a cymbal stand, which he uses as an accent on certain beats for songs such as "With or Without You".

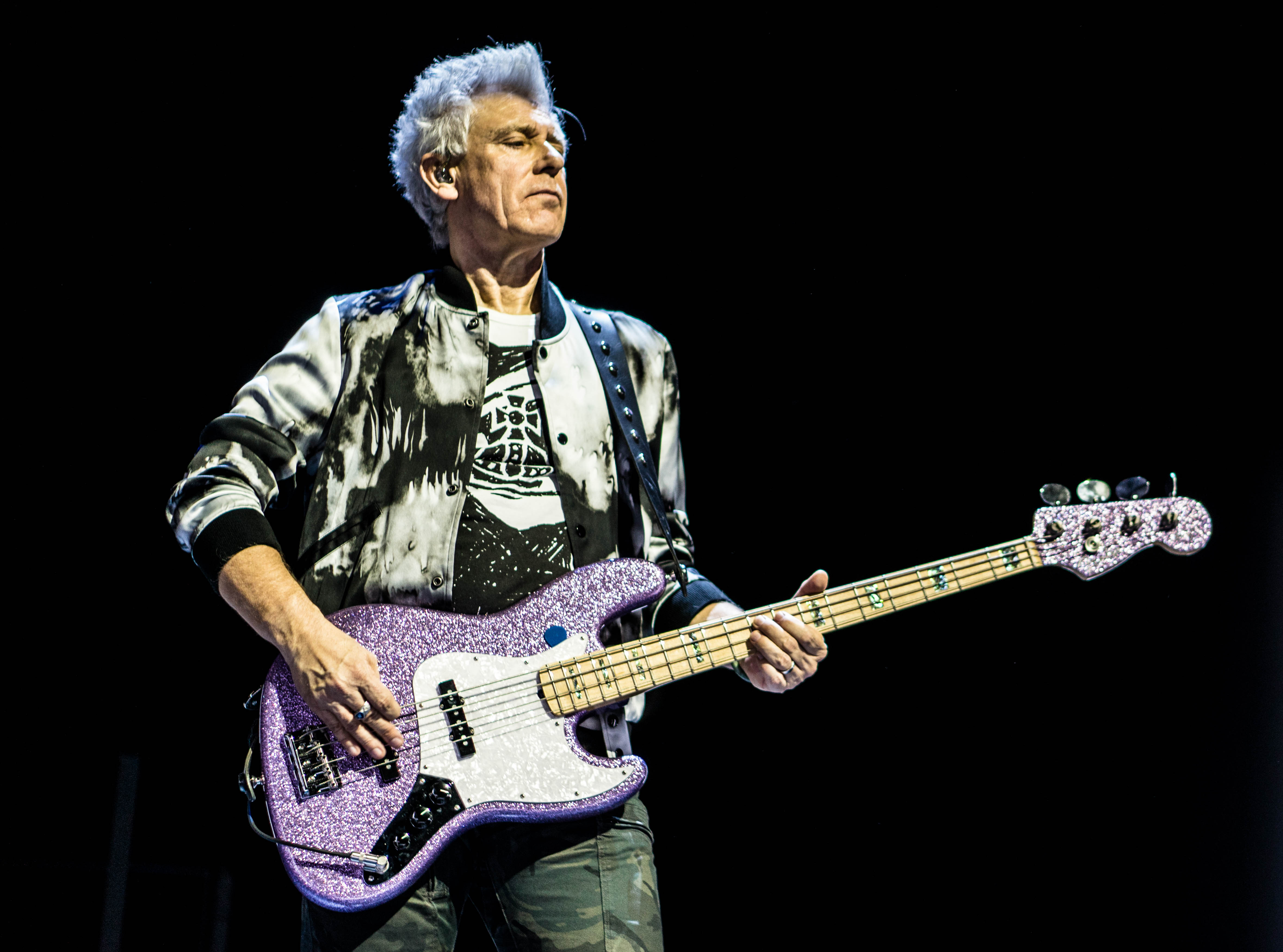
Clayton in October 2018

Clayton's style of bass guitar playing is noted for what instructor Patrick Pfeiffer called "harmonic syncopation". With this technique, Clayton plays a consistent rhythm that stresses the eighth note of each bar, but he "anticipates the harmony by shifting the tonality" before the guitar chords do. This gives the music a feeling of "forward motion". In the band's early years, Clayton had no formal musical training, and he generally played simple bass parts in 4/4 time consisting of steady eighth notes emphasising the roots of chords. Over time, he incorporated influences from Motown and reggae into his playing style, and as he became a better timekeeper, his playing became more melodic. Flanagan said that he "often plays with the swollen, vibrating bottom sound of a Jamaican dub bassist, covering the most sonic space with the smallest number of notes". Clayton relies on his own instincts when developing basslines, deciding whether to follow the chord progressions of the guitars or play a counter-melody, and when to play an octave higher or lower. He cites bassists such as Paul Simonon, Bruce Foxton, Peter Hook, Jean-Jacques Burnel, and James Jamerson as major influences on him. Describing his role in the rhythm section, Clayton said, "Larry's drums have always told me what to play, and then the chords tell me where to go".

=== Lyrics and themes ===
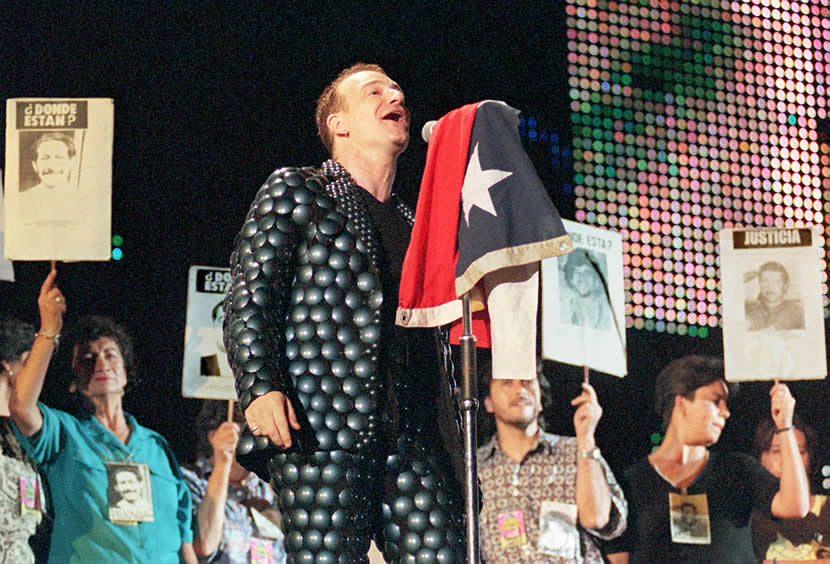
U2 performing "Mothers of the Disappeared" in Chile in 1998 with the families of Detenidos Desaparecidos. The song was written as a tribute to the women whose children were killed or forcibly disappeared at the hands of the Pinochet dictatorship.

U2's lyrics are known for their social and political themes, and often contain Christian and spiritual imagery. Songs such as "Sunday Bloody Sunday", "Silver and Gold", and "Mothers of the Disappeared" were motivated by current events. The first was written about the Troubles in Northern Ireland, while the last was a tribute to COMADRES, the women whose children were killed or forcibly disappeared at the hands of the Salvadoran government during the country's civil war. The song "Running to Stand Still" from The Joshua Tree was inspired by the heroin addiction that was sweeping through Dublin—the lyric "I see seven towers, but I only see one way out" references the Ballymun Towers of Dublin's Northside and the imagery throughout the song personifies the struggles of addiction.

Bono's personal conflicts and turmoil inspired songs like "Mofo", "Tomorrow" and "Kite". An emotional yearning or pleading frequently appears as a lyrical theme, in tracks such as "Yahweh", "Peace on Earth", and "Please". Much of U2's songwriting and music is motivated by contemplations of loss and anguish, along with hopefulness and resilience, themes that are central to The Joshua Tree. Some of these lyrical ideas have been amplified by Bono and the band's personal experiences during their youth in Ireland, as well as Bono's campaigning and activism later in his life. U2 have used tours such as Zoo TV and PopMart to caricature social trends, such as media overload and consumerism, respectively.

While the band and its fans often affirm the political nature of their songs, U2's lyrics and music were criticised as apolitical by Slate in 2002 for their perceived vagueness and "fuzzy imagery", and a lack of any specific references to people.

=== Influences ===
The band cite the Who, the Clash, Television, Ramones, the Beatles, Joy Division, Siouxsie and the Banshees, Elvis Presley, Patti Smith, Kraftwerk, and the Associates as influences. Van Morrison has been cited by Bono as an influence, and the Rock and Roll Hall of Fame mentioned his influence on U2. U2 have also worked with or had influential relationships with artists including Johnny Cash, Green Day, Leonard Cohen, Bruce Springsteen, B.B. King, Lou Reed, Bob Dylan and Luciano Pavarotti. Bono said that David Bowie helped him discover the works of Bertolt Brecht, William Burroughs, Springsteen, and Brian Eno.

== Activism and philanthropy ==
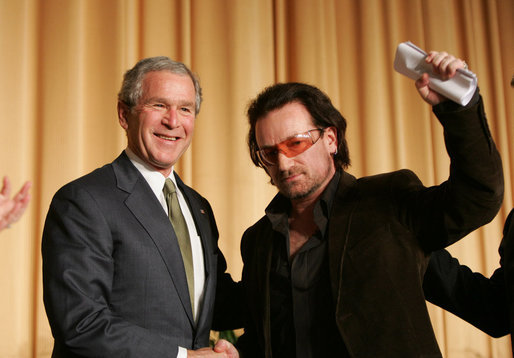
Bono with then-US President George W. Bush in 2006

Since the early 1980s, the members of U2—as a band and individually—have collaborated with other musicians, artists, celebrities, and politicians to address issues concerning poverty, disease, and social injustice.

In 1984, Bono and Clayton participated in Band Aid to raise money for the 1983–1985 famine in Ethiopia. This initiative produced the hit charity single "Do They Know It's Christmas?", the first of several collaborations between U2 and Bob Geldof. In July 1985, U2 performed at Live Aid, a follow-up to Band Aid's efforts. Bono and his wife Ali, invited by World Vision, visited Ethiopia that year where they witnessed the famine first-hand. Bono later said that this laid the groundwork for his Africa campaigning and some of his songwriting. In 1986, U2 participated in the Self Aid benefit concert for unemployment in Ireland and the Conspiracy of Hope benefit concert tour in support of Amnesty International. The same year, Bono and Ali also visited Nicaragua and El Salvador at the invitation of the Sanctuary movement and saw the effects of the Salvadoran Civil War. These 1986 events greatly influenced The Joshua Tree album, which was being recorded at the time.

During their Zoo TV Tour in 1992, U2 participated in the "Stop Sellafield" concert with Greenpeace to protest a nuclear fuel reprocessing plant. Events in Sarajevo during the Bosnian War inspired their song with Brian Eno called "Miss Sarajevo", which they debuted at a September 1995 Pavarotti & Friends concert to benefit the War Child charity. U2 fulfilled a 1993 promise to play in Sarajevo during the PopMart Tour in 1997. In May 1998, they performed in Belfast to promote Northern Ireland's referendum over the Good Friday Agreement, which ended the Troubles. During the show, Bono brought Northern Irish political leaders David Trimble and John Hume on stage to shake hands; the referendum ultimately was passed. Later that year, all proceeds from the release of the "Sweetest Thing" single went towards supporting the Chernobyl Children's Project.

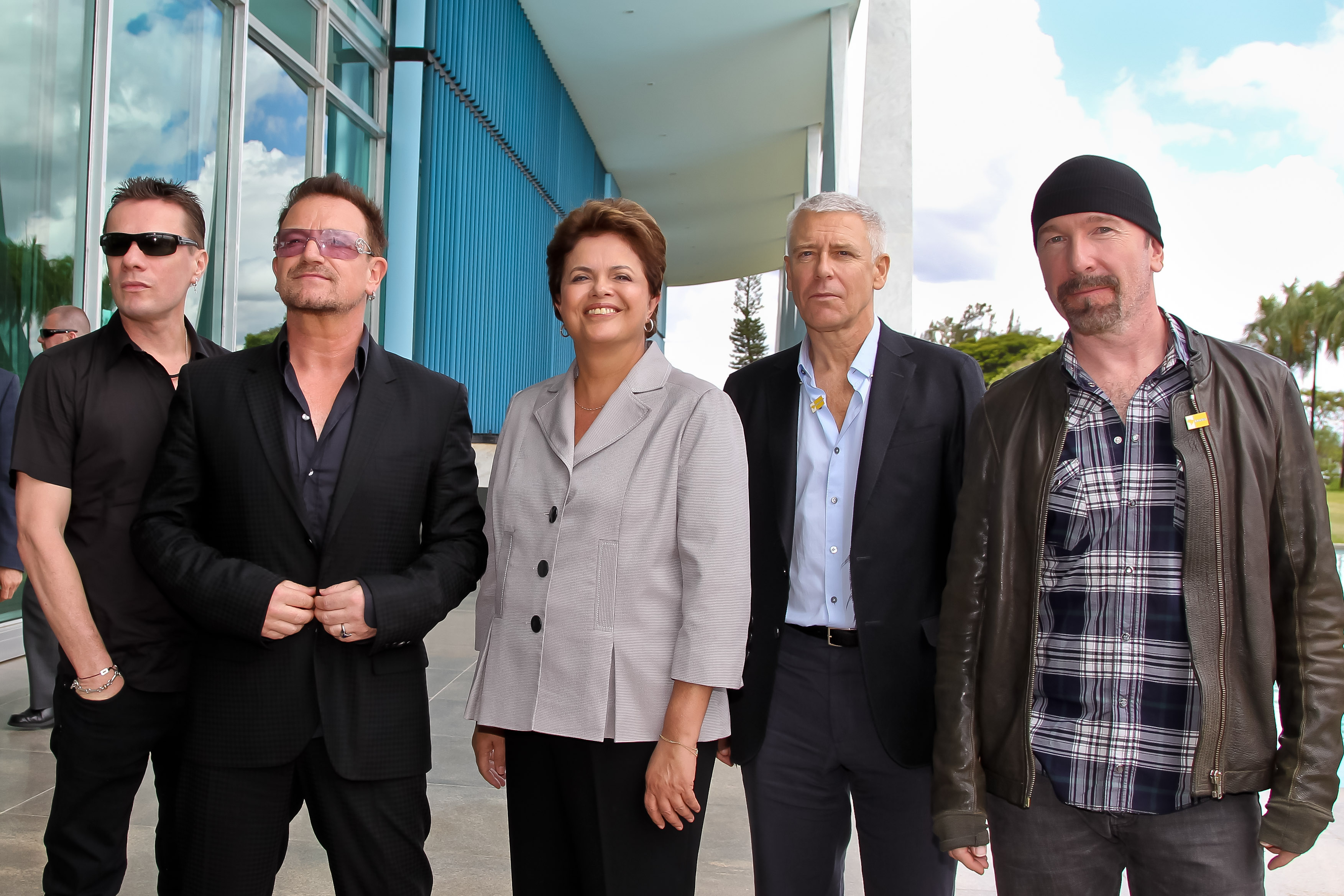
U2 with Brazilian president Dilma Rousseff in 2011 (from left to right): Mullen, Bono, Rousseff, Clayton, and the Edge

The band dedicated their 2000 song "Walk On" to Burma's pro-democracy leader Aung San Suu Kyi, who had been under house arrest since 1989. In late 2003, Bono and the Edge participated in the South Africa HIV/AIDS awareness 46664 series of concerts hosted by Nelson Mandela. In 2005, the band played the Live 8 concert in London, which Geldof helped stage on the 20th anniversary of Live Aid to support the Make Poverty History campaign. The band and manager Paul McGuinness were awarded Amnesty International's Ambassador of Conscience Award for their work in promoting human rights.

Since 2000, Bono's campaigning has included Jubilee 2000 with Geldof, Muhammad Ali, and others to promote the cancellation of third-world debt during the Great Jubilee. In January 2002, Bono co-founded the multinational NGO DATA, with the aim of improving the social, political, and financial state of Africa. He continued his campaigns for debt and HIV/AIDS relief into June 2002 by making high-profile visits to Africa. Product Red, a for-profit licensed brand seeking to raise money for the Global Fund, was co-founded by Bono in 2006. The ONE Campaign, originally the US counterpart of Make Poverty History, was shaped by his efforts and vision.

In November 2005, the Edge and producer Bob Ezrin helped introduce Music Rising, an initiative to replace instruments for musicians in the New Orleans area impacted by Hurricane Katrina and Hurricane Rita. In 2006, U2 collaborated with Green Day to record a remake of the song "The Saints Are Coming" by the Skids to benefit Music Rising. A live version of the song recorded at the Louisiana Superdome was released on the single.

U2 have provided funding for music education on several occasions. In 2010, an education programme for children called Music Generation was established from funds provided by U2 and the Ireland Funds. The band initially gave €5 million for the programme's creation, followed by donations of €2 million in 2015, some of their earnings from their Joshua Tree Tour 2017, and €5 million in 2026. The programme provided tuition to 116,000 children in 2023. Following U2's residency at Sphere in the Las Vegas Valley, the University of Nevada, Las Vegas's College of Fine Arts announced in January 2025 that the band had made a donation of $300,000 to the U2:UV Music Scholarship and Experiential Fund for music education.

In April 2020, the group donated €10 million to purchase personal protective equipment for Irish healthcare workers working during the COVID-19 pandemic. The band also donated US$1.5 million to ease the impact of the pandemic on the music industry, including a €200,000 donation to the Songs from an Empty Room fundraiser. In January 2025, U2 donated $1 million to FireAid to benefit those affected by the Southern California wildfires.

U2 were honoured with the Innovator Award at the 3rd iHeartRadio Music Awards in April 2016 for their "impact on popular culture and commitment to social causes". Bono has received many awards for his music and activism, including the Legion of Honour from the French Government in 2003, Time's Person of the Year for 2005 (along with Bill Gates and Melinda Gates), and an honorary British knighthood in 2007. Some news sources have questioned the efficacy of Bono's campaign to relieve debt and provide assistance to Africa.

== Other projects and collaborations ==
The members of U2 have undertaken side projects, sometimes in collaboration with some of their bandmates. In 1985, Bono recorded the song "In a Lifetime" with the Irish band Clannad. The Edge recorded a solo soundtrack album for the film Captive, which was released in 1986 and included a vocal performance by Sinéad O'Connor on the song "Heroine" that predates her own debut album by a year. For Robbie Robertson's 1987 self-titled solo album, U2 performed on the songs "Sweet Fire of Love" and "Testimony". Bono and the Edge wrote the song "She's a Mystery to Me" for Roy Orbison, which was featured on his 1989 album Mystery Girl. In 1990, Bono and the Edge provided the original score to the Royal Shakespeare Company London's stage adaptation of A Clockwork Orange. One track, "Alex Descends into Hell for a Bottle of Milk/Korova 1", was on the B-side to "The Fly" single. That same year, Mullen produced and played drums on "Put 'Em Under Pressure", a song for the Ireland national team for the 1990 FIFA World Cup; the song topped the Irish charts for 13 weeks. For the 1995 James Bond film GoldenEye, Bono and the Edge wrote the title song "GoldenEye", which was performed by Tina Turner. Clayton and Mullen reworked Lalo Schifrin's "Theme from Mission: Impossible" for the franchise's 1996 film. Bono and the Edge ventured into theatre again by writing the music and lyrics for the Broadway musical Spider-Man: Turn Off the Dark, which opened in June 2011. Bono and the Edge collaborated with Dutch DJ Martin Garrix on the 2021 track "We Are the People", which served as the official song of the UEFA Euro 2020 tournament.

In addition to collaborating with fellow musicians, U2 have worked with several authors. American author William S. Burroughs had a guest appearance in U2's video for "Last Night on Earth" shortly before he died. Video footage of him reading his poem "Thanksgiving Prayer" was used during a Zoo TV Tour television special. Other collaborators include Allen Ginsberg and Salman Rushdie. Lyrics from Rushdie's 1999 book The Ground Beneath Her Feet were adapted by U2 into the song "The Ground Beneath Her Feet", which was one of three tracks the group contributed to The Million Dollar Hotel movie soundtrack in 2000.

In April 2017, U2 were featured on a Kendrick Lamar song, "XXX", from his album Damn.

== Legacy ==
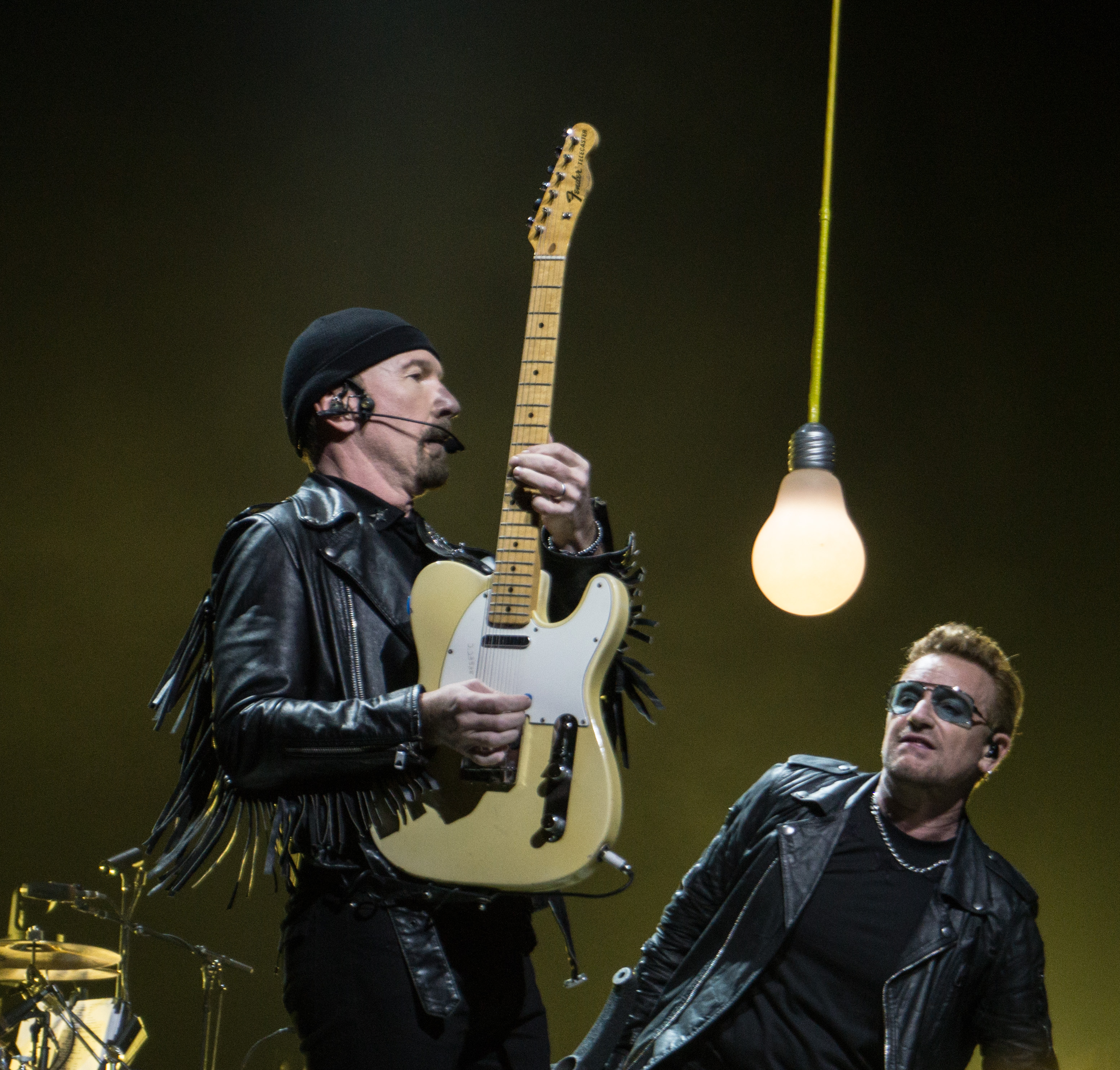
Rolling Stone ranked the Edge and Bono among the greatest guitarists and singers, respectively.

U2 have sold an estimated 170 million records worldwide, placing them among the best-selling music artists in history. The group's fifth studio album, The Joshua Tree, is one of the best-selling albums in the US (10 million copies shipped) and worldwide (25 million copies sold). With 52 million certified units by the RIAA, U2 rank as the 24th-highest-selling music artist in the US. U2 have eight albums that have reached number one in the US, the third-most of any group. They were the first group to attain number-one albums in the US in the 1980s, 1990s, 2000s, and 2010s. In the UK, the group have had seven number-one singles, tied for the 17th-most of any artist, and eleven number-one albums, tied for the 8th-most of any artist. The band's 1,468 weeks spent on the UK music charts ranks 18th all-time. In their native Ireland, U2 hold the record for most number-one singles with 21, and they have 10 number-one albums.

In the 1980s, U2 "dominated the alternative rock scene", according to cultural critic Kevin J. H. Dettmar. Similarly, in the next decade, they were one of the most famous alternative rock bands worldwide and among the highest-selling rock bands. In the 35-year history of Billboard's Alternative Airplay chart, U2 holds records for most songs charted (42), most number ones in the 1980s (2, tied), and most number ones in the 1990s (6). Record sales declined in the 2000s and the music industry entered an age of often illegal digital downloading, but according to author Mat Snow, U2 prospered more than younger acts because of a loyal following that held an attachment to the album format. Snow said, "Children of the album era as they were, U2 would never stop regarding the album as the core statement of their creativity", despite progressively decreasing sales, while he noted that live shows consequently became the group's greatest source of revenue.

Based on data from Pollstar, U2 were the second-highest-grossing musical act from 1980 to 2022, earning US$2.127 billion in revenue from 26.178 million tickets sold. According to Billboard Boxscore, the band grossed US$1.67 billion in ticket sales from 1990 to 2016, second only to the Rolling Stones. U2 were the only group in the top 25 touring acts from 2000 to 2009 to sell out every show they played. According to Pollstar, the band grossed US$1.038 billion and sold 9,300,500 tickets from 255 shows played between 2010 and November 2019, earning the publication's title of touring artist of the 2010s decade; U2 were the only artist to surpass US$1 billion grossed during that span. U2 ranked as the second-best-selling live artist from 2001 to 2025 based on Pollstar's data, with 20.216 million tickets sold from 594 shows for gross revenues of US$2.187 billion. Forbes has named U2 the world's annual highest-earning music artist a record five times. The Sunday Times' 2020 Irish Rich List estimated the group's collective wealth at €670 million.

U2 are regarded as one of the greatest pop-rock acts of all time. U2 was ranked 22nd on "Rolling Stone's 100 Greatest Artists of All Time", while ranking Bono the 32nd-greatest singer, the Edge the 38th-greatest guitarist, and Mullen the 96th-greatest drummer. The magazine placed Bono and the Edge at number 35 on its list of the "100 Greatest Songwriters of All Time". In 2004, Q ranked U2 as the fourth-biggest band in a list compiled based on album sales, time spent on the UK charts, and largest audience for a headlining show. VH1 placed U2 at number 19 on its 2010 list of "The 100 Greatest Artists of All Time". In 2010, eight of U2's songs appeared on Rolling Stone's list of the "500 Greatest Songs of All Time", with "One" ranking the highest at number 36. Five of the group's twelve studio albums were ranked on the 2012 edition of Rolling Stone's list of the "500 Greatest Albums of All Time"—The Joshua Tree placed the highest at number 27. Reflecting on the band's popularity and worldwide impact, Jeff Pollack for HuffPost wrote, "like the Who before them, U2 wrote songs about things that were important and resonated with their audience". Houston Press journalist John Seaborn Gray attributed U2's pioneering impact on pop-rock music largely to the Edge's unique guitar style.

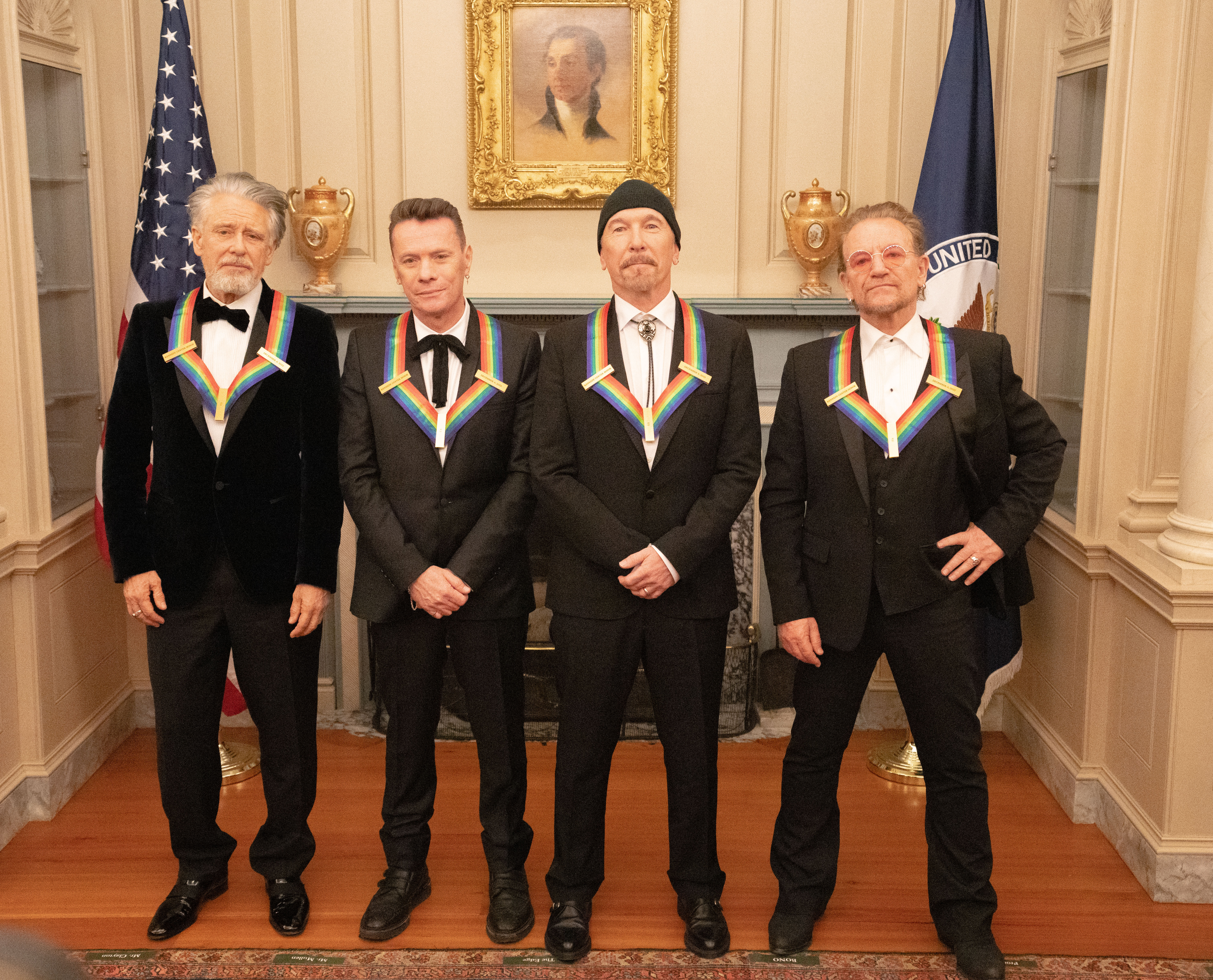
U2 were recipients of Kennedy Center Honors in 2022.

U2 received their first Grammy Award in 1988 for The Joshua Tree, and they have won 22 in total out of 46 nominations, more than any other group. These include Best Rock Performance by a Duo or Group, Album of the Year, Record of the Year, Song of the Year, and Best Rock Album. In the UK, U2 have received 8 Brit Awards out of 20 nominations from the British Phonographic Industry, including five wins for International Group of the Year. They were the first international group to win the Brit Award for Outstanding Contribution to Music. In Ireland, U2 have won 14 Meteor Music Awards since they began in 2001. Other awards won by the band and their members include one American Music Award, four Ivor Novello Awards, six MTV Video Music Awards, eleven Q Awards, two Juno Awards, five NME Awards, and two Golden Globe Awards. The band were inducted into the Rock and Roll Hall of Fame in March 2005. In 2006, all four members of the band received ASCAP awards for writing the songs "I Still Haven't Found What I'm Looking For" and "Vertigo". In 2022, the group received Kennedy Center Honors for their contributions in the performing arts, making them only the fifth musical group to be so honoured. In May 2025, the members of U2 received the Ivors Academy Fellowship for their songwriting, making them the first Irish songwriters to be so honoured.

In September 2026, the Central Bank of Ireland issued a €2 commemorative coin celebrating the band´s 50th anniversary. Although the coin holds legal tender status across the Eurozone, it was not produced for general circulation. Instead, the release was limited to 150,000 pieces in coin cards and 5,000 proof editions in blisters. Shaughn McGrath designed the coin.

== Band members ==
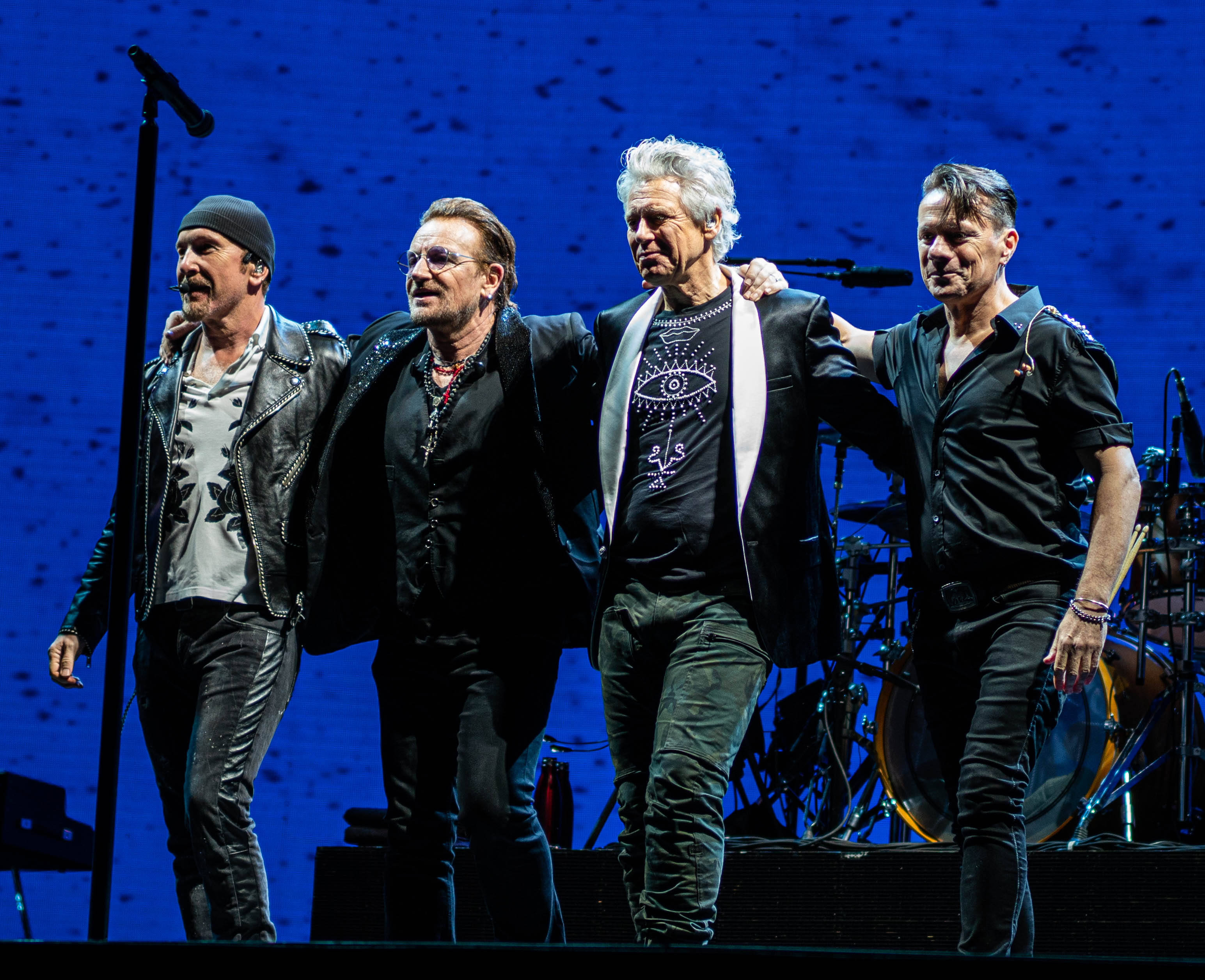
U2 in November 2019 (from left to right): The Edge, Bono, Clayton, Mullen

=== Current members ===
- Bono (Paul Hewson) – lead vocals, harmonica (1976–present); guitar (1978–2014)
- The Edge (David Evans) – guitar, keyboards, backing vocals (1976–present)
- Adam Clayton – bass guitar (1976–present)
- Larry Mullen Jr. – drums, percussion (1976–present; not touring 2023–2024)

=== Live musicians ===
- Terry Lawless – keyboards (2001–present)
- Bram van den Berg – drums, percussion (2023–2024)
- Stuart Morgan – bass guitar (November 27, 1993 only)

=== Former members ===
- Dik Evans – guitar (1976–1978)
- Ivan McCormick – guitar (1976)

== Discography ==
- Boy (1980)
- October (1981)
- War (1983)
- The Unforgettable Fire (1984)
- The Joshua Tree (1987)
- Rattle and Hum (1988)
- Achtung Baby (1991)
- Zooropa (1993)
- Pop (1997)
- All That You Can't Leave Behind (2000)
- How to Dismantle an Atomic Bomb (2004)
- No Line on the Horizon (2009)
- Songs of Innocence (2014)
- Songs of Experience (2017)
- Songs of Surrender (2023)
- Carnaval de Luz (2026)

== Live performances ==
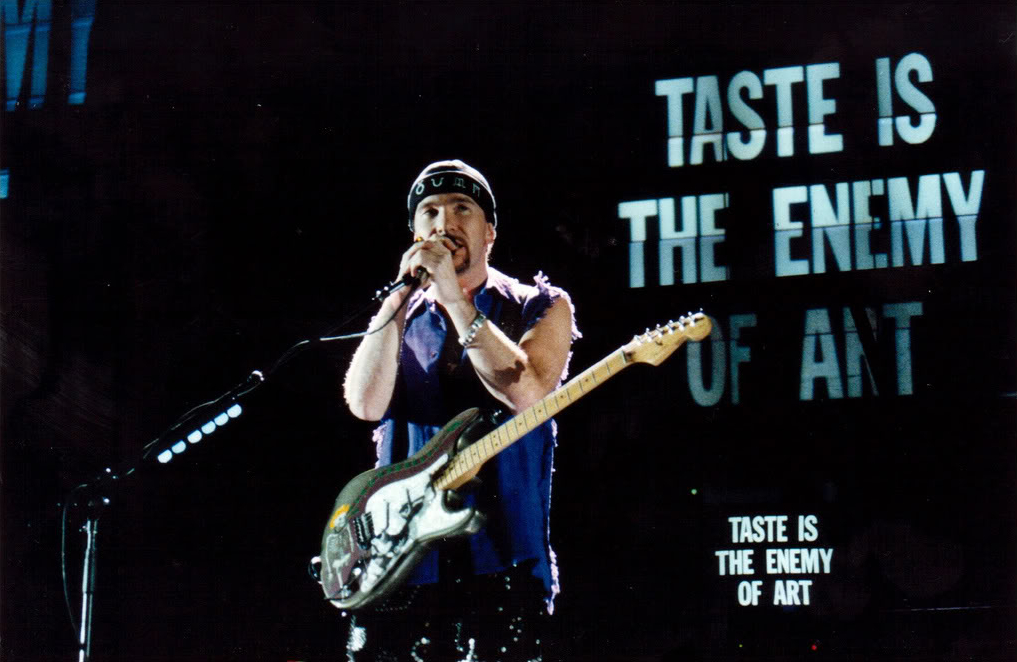
The Edge during the band's Zoo TV Tour in November 1993

=== Concert tours ===
- U2-3 Tour (1979–1980)
- 11 O'Clock Tick Tock Tour (1980)
- Boy Tour (1980–1981)
- October Tour (1981–1982)
- War Tour (1982–1983)
- The Unforgettable Fire Tour (1984–1985)
- A Conspiracy of Hope (1986)
- The Joshua Tree Tour (1987)
- Lovetown Tour (1989–1990)
- Zoo TV Tour (1992–1993)
- PopMart Tour (1997–1998)
- Elevation Tour (2001)
- Vertigo Tour (2005–2006)
- U2 360° Tour (2009–2011)
- Innocence + Experience Tour (2015)
- The Joshua Tree Tour 2017 (2017)
- Experience + Innocence Tour (2018)
- The Joshua Tree Tour 2019 (2019)
- The Greatest Show on Earth World Tour (2027)

=== Concert residencies ===
- U2:UV Achtung Baby Live at Sphere (2023–2024)

== See also ==
- List of Irish Grammy Award winners and nominees
