= Live from the Point Depot =

Love: Live from the Point Depot

Live album from The Complete U2 box set by U2
- Released: 23 November 2004
- Recorded: 31 December 1989
- Venues: Point Depot, Dublin, Ireland
- Genre: Rock
- Length: 99:38
- Label: Island / Interscope

The Complete U2 chronology
Early Demos (2004)	Love: Live from the Point Depot (2004)	Live from Under the Brooklyn Bridge (2004)

Love: Live from the Point Depot is a digital live album by U2 released through the iTunes Music Store on 23 November 2004 as part of the digital box set The Complete U2. The show was recorded during U2's Lovetown Tour on New Year's Eve 1989 at the Point Depot in Dublin.

The show had an international live radio broadcast and became one of the most heavily bootlegged U2 shows of all time. Fans were encouraged to tape a recording of the show, and issue #12 of U2's fan magazine Propaganda included a special cassette cover for those who taped the broadcast.

Along with the digital live album Live from Boston 1981, the album's tracks could not be purchased individually and were only available to those who purchase the entire digital box set. This release marks the show's first official release, and is no longer available for download from iTunes.

== Track listing ==
No.	Title	Length
1.	"Auld Lang Syne" / "Where the Streets Have No Name"	6:55
2.	"I Will Follow"	4:20
3.	"I Still Haven't Found What I'm Looking For" (Features a snippet of Bob Marley's "Exodus")	5:09
4.	"MLK"	1:53
5.	"One Tree Hill"	4:52
6.	"Gloria"	4:34
7.	"God Part II"	3:35
8.	"Desire"	3:10
9.	"All Along the Watchtower"	4:07
10.	"All I Want Is You"	1:03
11.	"Bad"	7:31
12.	"Van Diemen's Land" (The Edge on lead vocals)	2:59
13.	"The Star-Spangled Banner" / "Bullet the Blue Sky/ snippet of 11 O'Clock Tick Tock"	6:23
14.	"Running to Stand Still" / "Dirty Old Town"	5:16
15.	"New Year's Day" (Features a snippet of "The Times They Are a-Changin' at the beginning of track")	4:44
16.	"Pride (In the Name of Love)"	6:03 encore(s):
17.	"Party Girl"	3:41
18.	"Angel of Harlem/ snippet of Suspicious Minds"	4:14
19.	"When Love Comes to Town"	5:02
20.	"Love Rescue Me"	6:42
21.	"40"	7:25
Total length:		99:38

== Personnel ==
U2

- Bono – lead vocals, guitar, harmonica
- The Edge – guitar, keyboards, vocals; bass guitar on "40"
- Adam Clayton – bass guitar, guitar on "40"
- Larry Mullen Jr. – drums

With guest:

- B. B. King – guitar, vocals (featured on "Angel of Harlem," "When Love Comes to Town," and "Love Rescue Me")
