= The Best of 1980–1990 =

1998 greatest hits album by U2

Greatest hits album by U2
- Released: 2 November 1998
- Recorded: 1980–1989, 1998
- Genres: Rock; post-punk
- Length: 65:35
- Label: Island
- Producers: Brian Eno; Daniel Lanois; Steve Lillywhite; Jimmy Iovine; U2; St. Francis Xavier

U2 chronology
Please: PopHeart Live EP (1997)	The Best of 1980–1990 (1998)	PopMart: Live from Mexico City (1998)

Singles from The Best of 1980–1990
- 1. "Sweetest Thing" Released: 19 October 1998

The Best of 1980–1990 is the first greatest hits compilation by Irish rock band U2, released on 2 November 1998. It mostly contains the group's hit singles from the 1980s, but also mixes in some live staples, as well as a re-recording of the 1987 B-side "Sweetest Thing". In April 1999, a companion video (featuring music videos and live footage) was released. The album was followed by another compilation, The Best of 1990–2000, in 2002.

A limited-edition version of the album that included a second disc of B-sides was released a week earlier than the standard single-disc version. At the time of release, the official word was that the two-disc album would be available the first week the album went on sale, then pulled from stores. While this edict never materialized, it did result in the two-disc version being in very high demand. Both versions charted in the Billboard 200, with the two-disc version debuting at number two and setting a new first-week sales record in the United States for a greatest hits album by a group, with 237,500 copies sold.

The boy on the album's cover is Peter Rowen, brother of Bono's friend Guggi (real name Derek Rowen) of the Virgin Prunes. Peter also appears on the covers of U2's early EP Three, two of their first three albums (Boy and War), and Early Demos.

== Commercial performance ==
Professional ratings
Review scores
Source	Rating
AllMusic (Standard edition)	4.5/5 stars
AllMusic (The B sides)	4/5 stars
Christgau's Consumer Guide	(1-star Honorable Mention)
Entertainment Weekly	B
The Rolling Stone Album Guide	4/5 stars

In the United States, the double-disc version of the album (The Best of 1980-1990/The B-Sides) debuted and peaked at number two on the Billboard 200 during the week of 21 November 1998, with 237,500 copies sold. This set a new record for the best-selling opening week for a greatest hits collection by a group in the SoundScan era. The next week, it fell to number five, while the single-disc version of the album entered the chart at number 57. The single-disc version of the compilation later peaked at number 45 on the Billboard 200. The Best of 1980-1990/The B-Sides remained on the chart for 17 weeks, while the single-disc version was present on the chart for 44 weeks. The double-disc version was certified double platinum by the Recording Industry Association of America, denoting shipments of two million, on 4 December 1998; the standard edition was certified double platinum on 6 March 2002.

In the United Kingdom, the limited double-disc version debuted at number one on the UK Albums Chart on 14 November 1998, before dropping the following week to number two. It remained on the chart for 20 weeks. The single-disc edition entered at number eight on 21 November 1998, and two weeks later it reached its peak of number four. It charted for 126 weeks in the UK. The single-disc edition was certified quintuple platinum by the British Phonographic Industry, denoting shipments of 1.5 million units, on 8 November 2002.

In Canada, the double-disc version release had a numbered, limited edition of 175,000 units pressed. The double-disc version of the album debuted at the top of the Billboard Canadian Albums Chart for the week of 21 November 1998; this version stayed on the chart for four weeks. The next week, the standard edition debuted and peaked at number five on the chart, before falling to number eight the following week. The single-disc version remained on the chart for 15 weeks.

In Ireland, the album debuted with the highest single-week sales since 1993, when IRMA started keeping records. The album reached number one on Ireland's album chart and remained on the chart for 76 weeks.

== Track listing ==
=== Disc one ===
All music is composed by U2, with lyrics by Bono.

No.	Title	Album	Length
1.	"Pride (In the Name of Love)"	The Unforgettable Fire (1984)	3:48
2.	"New Year's Day" (Japanese single version)	War (1983)	4:17
3.	"With or Without You"	The Joshua Tree (1987)	4:55
4.	"I Still Haven't Found What I'm Looking For"	The Joshua Tree	4:38
5.	"Sunday Bloody Sunday"	War	4:40
6.	"Bad" (Edited version)	The Unforgettable Fire	5:50
7.	"Where the Streets Have No Name" (Edited version)	The Joshua Tree	4:35
8.	"I Will Follow"	Boy (1980)	3:36
9.	"The Unforgettable Fire"	The Unforgettable Fire	4:53
10.	"Sweetest Thing" (Single mix)	Newly recorded version	3:00
11.	"Desire"	Rattle and Hum (1988)	2:59
12.	"When Love Comes to Town"	Rattle and Hum	4:17
13.	"Angel of Harlem"	Rattle and Hum	3:49
14.	"All I Want Is You" / "October" (Hidden track)	Rattle and Hum; October (1981)	6:30; 2:21
Total length:			65:35

Japan bonus track
No.	Title	Album	Length
15.	"One Tree Hill" / "October" (Hidden track)	The Joshua Tree; October	5:24; 2:21
Total length:			69:32

=== Disc two (Limited Edition B-Sides) ===
All tracks are written by U2, except where noted.

No.	Title	Originally Released on	Length
1.	"The Three Sunrises"	"The Unforgettable Fire" single	3:52
2.	"Spanish Eyes"	"I Still Haven't Found What I'm Looking For" single	3:14
3.	"Sweetest Thing"	"Where the Streets Have No Name" single	3:03
4.	"Love Comes Tumbling" (Best Of edit)	"The Unforgettable Fire" single	4:40
5.	"Bass Trap" (Best Of edit)	"The Unforgettable Fire" single	3:31
6.	"Dancing Barefoot" (Patti Smith, Ivan Kral)	"When Love Comes to Town" single	4:45
7.	"Everlasting Love" (Buzz Cason, Mac Gayden)	"All I Want Is You" single	3:20
8.	"Unchained Melody" (Alex North, Hy Zaret)	"All I Want Is You" single	4:52
9.	"Walk to the Water"	"With or Without You" single	4:49
10.	"Luminous Times (Hold on to Love)"	"With or Without You" single	4:35
11.	"Hallelujah Here She Comes" (Best Of edit)	"Desire" single	4:00
12.	"Silver and Gold"	"Where the Streets Have No Name" single	4:37
13.	"Endless Deep"	"Two Hearts Beat as One" single	2:57
14.	"A Room at the Heartbreak Hotel" (Best Of edit)	"Angel of Harlem" single	4:32
15.	"Trash, Trampoline and the Party Girl"	"A Celebration" single	2:33
Total length:			59:53

- Note: The version of "Bass Trap" found on this compilation is a shortened edit from the original 5:14 version found on "The Unforgettable Fire" 12" single EP from 1985. The same goes for the version of "A Room at the Heartbreak Hotel", which is an edit from the original version (5:29) on the "Angel of Harlem" single from 1989.

== Charts ==
=== Weekly charts ===
Weekly chart performance for The Best of 1980–1990
Chart (1998–2014)	Peak position
Australian Albums (ARIA)	1
Austrian Albums (Ö3 Austria)	1
Belgian Albums (Ultratop Flanders)	1
Belgian Albums (Ultratop Wallonia)	1
Canadian Albums (Billboard)	1
Danish Albums (Hitlisten)	8
Dutch Albums (Album Top 100)	1
Finnish Albums (Suomen virallinen lista)	3
French Compilations (SNEP)	1
German Albums (Offizielle Top 100)	1
Hungarian Albums (MAHASZ)	3
Irish Albums (IRMA)	1
Italian Albums (FIMI)	1
Mexican Albums (Top 100 Mexico)	80
New Zealand Albums (RMNZ)	1
Norwegian Albums (VG-lista)	2
Portuguese Albums (AFP)	1
Scottish Albums (Official Charts)	1
Spanish Albums (AFYVE)	1
Swedish Albums (Sverigetopplistan)	1
Swiss Albums (Schweizer Hitparade)	1
UK Albums (Official Charts)	1
US Billboard 200	45
US Billboard 200 The B-Sides	2

=== Year-end charts ===
Year-end chart performance for The Best of 1980–1990
Chart (1998)	Position
Australian Albums (ARIA)	6
Austrian Albums (Ö3 Austria)	16
Belgian Albums (Ultratop Flanders)	2
Belgian Albums (Ultratop Wallonia)	3
Canadian Albums (RPM)	45
Danish Albums (Hitlisten)	30
Dutch Albums (Album Top 100)	5
European Top 100 Albums (Music & Media)	23
German Albums (Offizielle Top 100)	41
New Zealand Albums (RMNZ)	11
Spanish Albums (AFYPE)	17
Swedish Albums & Compilations (Sverigetopplistan)	42
Swiss Albums (Schweizer Hitparade)	19
UK Albums (OCC)	21
Chart (1999)	Position
Australian Albums (ARIA)	28
Austrian Albums (Ö3 Austria)	6
Belgian Albums (Ultratop Flanders)	15
Belgian Albums (Ultratop Wallonia)	17
Canadian Albums (RPM)	32
Danish Albums (Hitlisten)	50
Dutch Albums (MegaCharts)	7
European Albums (Music & Media)	20
German Albums (Offizielle Top 100)	27
New Zealand Albums (RMNZ)	38
Swiss Albums (Schweizer Hitparade)	34
UK Albums (OCC)	55
US Billboard 200	110
US Billboard 200 The B-Sides	134
Chart (2000)	Position
Belgian Albums (Ultratop Flanders)	91
Canadian Albums (Nielsen SoundScan)	161
French Compilations (SNEP)	25
UK Albums (OCC)	136
Chart (2001)	Position
Australian Albums (ARIA)	70
Belgian Albums (Ultratop Flanders)	94
Canadian Albums (Nielsen SoundScan)	161
Dutch Albums (MegaCharts)	76
Chart (2002)	Position
Australian Albums (ARIA)	64
Canadian Albums (Nielsen SoundScan)	144
Canadian Alternative Albums (Nielsen SoundScan)	34
UK Albums (OCC)	166
Chart (2005)	Position
UK Albums (OCC)	177

== Certifications and sales ==
Region	Certification	Certified units/sales
Argentina (CAPIF) Standard edition	3× Platinum	180,000^{^}
Argentina (CAPIF) + B-Sides	Platinum	60,000^{^}
Australia (ARIA)	8× Platinum	560,000^{^}
Austria (IFPI Austria)	2× Platinum	100,000^{*}
Belgium (BRMA)	6× Platinum	300,000^{*}
Brazil	—	200,000
Canada (Music Canada)	6× Platinum	600,000^{^}
Denmark (IFPI Danmark)	Platinum	50,000^{^}
Finland (Musiikkituottajat)	Gold	29,864
France (SNEP)	2× Platinum	600,000^{*}
Germany (BVMI)	Platinum	500,000^{^}
Greece (IFPI Greece)	2× Platinum	60,000^{^}
Hungary (MAHASZ)	Gold	
Iceland	—	10,620
Italy (FIMI) sales since 2009	Gold	25,000^{*}
Japan (RIAJ)	2× Platinum	400,000^{^}
Mexico (AMPROFON)	Gold	100,000^{^}
Netherlands (NVPI)	Platinum	100,000^{^}
New Zealand (RMNZ)	9× Platinum	135,000^{^}
Norway (IFPI Norway)	Platinum	50,000^{*}
Poland (ZPAV)	Platinum	100,000^{*}
Portugal (AFP)	5× Platinum	200,000^{^}
Spain (Promusicae)	4× Platinum	400,000^{^}
Sweden (GLF)	Gold	40,000^{^}
Switzerland (IFPI Switzerland)	3× Platinum	150,000^{^}
United Kingdom (BPI)	5× Platinum	1,500,000^{^}
United States (RIAA) Standard edition	2× Platinum	2,000,000^{^}
United States (RIAA) + B-Sides	2× Platinum	1,000,000^{^}
Summaries
Europe (IFPI)	7× Platinum	7,000,000^{*}
^{*} Sales figures based on certification alone.^{^} Shipments figures based on certification alone.

== Video ==
The Best of 1980–1990

Video by U2
- Released: April 1999
- Recorded: 1980–1989, 1998
- Genres: Rock, post-punk, roots rock
- Length: 78 mins
- Label: Island / PolyGram
- Directors: Donald Cammell, Meiert Avis, Barry Devlin, Gavin Taylor, Phil Joanou, et al.

U2 chronology
PopMart: Live from Mexico City (1998)	The Best of 1980–1990 (1999)	Elevation 2001: Live from Boston (2001)

Music and words by U2. All tracks have been remastered for this release.

1. "Pride (In the Name of Love)"
2. "New Year's Day"
3. "With or Without You"
4. "I Still Haven't Found What I'm Looking For"
5. "Sunday Bloody Sunday" (from U2 Live at Red Rocks: Under a Blood Red Sky)
6. "Bad" (from Rattle and Hum)
7. "Where the Streets Have No Name"
8. "I Will Follow"
9. "The Unforgettable Fire"
10. "Sweetest Thing"
11. "Desire"
12. "When Love Comes to Town"
13. "Angel of Harlem"
14. "All I Want Is You"
15. "One Tree Hill" (Live - from a previously unreleased cut of Rattle and Hum)

=== Certifications ===
Region	Certification	Certified units/sales
Argentina (CAPIF)	5× Platinum	40,000^{^}
^{^} Shipments figures based on certification alone.

== Personnel ==
Personnel adapted from The Best of 1980–1990 CD booklet.

U2

- Bono – lead vocals, guitar, harmonica
- The Edge – guitar, keyboards, vocals
- Adam Clayton – bass guitar
- Larry Mullen Jr. – drums, percussion

Additional musicians

- Daragh O'Toole – string arrangement (10)
- Una O'Kane, Nicola Cleary, Aengus O'Connor, Nicholas Milne – strings (10)
- B. B. King – vocals and guitar (12)
- Bobbye Hall – percussion (12)
- Rebecca Evans Russell, Phyllis Duncan, Helen Duncan – backing vocals (12)
- Joey Miskulin – organ (13)
- The Memphis Horns – horns (13)
- Van Dyke Parks – string arrangement (14)
- Benmont Tench – keyboards (14)

Production

- Brian Eno – production (1, 3, 4, 6, 7, 9), additional production (10) engineering (6)
- Daniel Lanois – production (1, 3, 4, 6, 7, 9), additional production (10), mixing (4), engineering (6)
- Steve Lillywhite – production (2, 5, 8, 10), mixing (3)
- Jimmy Iovine – production (11–14)
- Paul Thomas – engineering (2, 5, 8)
- Flood – engineering (3, 4, 7)
- Joe O'Herlihy – recording (10)
- Pat McCarthy – recording (10), additional engineering (7)
- Paul Barrett – recording (11)
- Dave Ferguson, "Cowboy" Jack Clement – recording (12, 13)
- David Tickle – recording and mixing (14)
- Kevin Kilen – additional engineering (1, 6, 9)
- Steve Harris – additional recording and mixing (10)
- Shelly Yakus – mixing (11, 13), remixing (12)
- Rob Jacobs – mixing (13), mix assistance (11), remix assistance (12)

== See also ==
- U2 discography
- The Best of 1990–2000
- List of best-selling albums in Argentina
