= October (song) =

Song by U2

from the album October
- Released: 20 October 1981
- Recorded: July–August 1981
- Studio: Windmill Lane Studios (Dublin)
- Genre: Soft rock
- Length: 2:21
- Label: Island
- Songwriter: U2
- Producer: Steve Lillywhite

"October" is the seventh and title track from U2's 1981 album, October. It was included as a hidden track on The Best of 1980–1990 compilation. It is the only track from the October album included in the compilation.

== Lyrics and music ==
"October" reflects the spiritual turmoil of the band at the time it was written, during which three of the band's members were wrestling with whether being members of a rock band was consistent with their Christian beliefs. Lead singer Bono has said of "October":

"'October'...it's an image. We've been through the 60s, a time when things were in full bloom. We had fridges and cars, we sent people to the moon and everyone thought how great mankind was. And now, as we go through the 70s and 80s, it's a colder time of the year. It's after the harvest. Trees are stripped bare. You can see things and we finally realize that maybe we aren't so smart after all, now that there's millions of unemployed people, now that we used the technology we've been blessed with to build bombs for war machines, to build rockets, whatever. So 'October' is an ominous word, but it's also quite lyrical."

U2 guitarist the Edge plays piano on the track despite having stopped playing piano as a teenager. Author John D. Luerssen describes the piano part as "one of U2's most enduring and meditative keyboard-steered melodies" and considers its somber mood as a reflection of the Edge's recent experience on tour playing in Europe under grey skies.

== Live performances ==
"October" made its live debut on 16 August 1981 and this performance featured extended, rambling lyrics from Bono that were never used again live. It was a set list staple for much of the October Tour and followed "I Fall Down", another song from the October album that the Edge played on piano. However, it was omitted from the set list at all 1982 dates where U2 supported the J. Geils Band.

At the first show of the War Tour's "Pre-Tour", "October" preceded "New Year's Day", a pairing that would later become a famous segue at U2 concerts in the 1980s. The pairing was utilised for all "Pre-Tour" concerts with known set lists, but for the first proper leg and the first two weeks of the second leg, U2 reverted to a pairing initially tried at two October Tour dates, where "October" segued into "Tomorrow".

In May 1983, "New Year's Day" returned to its position after "October" and the pairing was filmed for the Live at Red Rocks: Under a Blood Red Sky concert film. This pairing was played at almost every show on the Unforgettable Fire Tour and Joshua Tree Tour, typically as part of a greater combination that closed most main sets: "Bad", then "October", "New Year's Day", and finally "Pride (In the Name of Love)". At a few early Joshua Tree Tour shows, "With or Without You" was played between "October" and "New Year's Day". It is one of only three songs from October to be played live after the Unforgettable Fire Tour; the others are "Gloria" and "Scarlet".

The demise of "October" as a live song came on the Lovetown Tour. It was played at most of the tour's early shows in the position it had held on the Unforgettable Fire and Joshua Tree Tours, but on 9 October 1989 in Melbourne, its replacement, "Van Diemen's Land", debuted. The 9 October show was the only one where both were played; subsequently, the band played one or the other, and they demonstrated a strong preference for "Van Diemen's Land", as it was from the band's most recent album, Rattle and Hum. "October" was played just three more times. On 18 July 2015, U2 played "October" at its first New York show on the Innocence + Experience Tour, having not played the song since 11 November 1989 in Auckland. After one other performance on the first leg, it then became a mainstay on the second leg in Europe, segueing directly into "Bullet the Blue Sky".

== Versions ==
Two alternate versions of "October" were released on the 1982 soundtrack to They Call it an Accident. The first is an instrumental, with a duration of about 1:25, which is basically just the first part of the album version. The second is a remix and re-edit of the song, with a duration of about 2:35, which fades in near the end of the piano intro and adds a synthesizer interlude before the vocal part.

== See also ==
- List of covers of U2 songs – October
