= Refugee (disambiguation) =

A refugee is a person who has left their home country under threat of their life, and cannot or will not return there.

Refugee or Refugees may also refer to:

== Literature and art ==
- The Refugee, alternative pirated 1865 publication title of the novel Israel Potter by Herman Melville
- The Refugee (play) Der Flüchtling, by Fritz Hochwälder 1945
- Refugee (Gratz novel), a 2017 young adult novel by Alan Gratz
- Refugee (Anthony novel), a 1983 novel by Piers Anthony
- Refugees (drama), a 1999 play by Zlatko Topčić
- Refugees (Kazaks), a 1917 painting by Jēkabs Kazaks

== Film and television ==
- The Refugee (film), a 1918 film directed by Cecil Hepworth
- Refugee (2000 film), an Indian Hindi-language film
- Refugee (2006 film), an Indian Bengali-language film
- Refugees (1933 film), a German film directed by Gustav Ucicky
- Refugees (film) (逃亡), a 1935 Chinese film directed by Yueh Feng
- Refugees (Shameless), an episode of the American TV series Shameless
- "Refugees" (The Wire), an episode of The Wire

== Music ==
- "The Refugee", by composer Karl Weigl Mary Hoxie Jones
- Refugee (band), a British progressive rock band

=== Albums ===
- Refugee (Refugee album), 1974
- Refugee (Samson album), 1990
- Refugee (Bad4Good album), 1992
- Refugees (EP), an EP by Embrace
- Refugee (Various Artists), collaborative charity album

=== Songs ===
- "Refugee", by Skip Marley, 2017
- "Refugees" (Embrace song), 2014
- "Refugee" (Jim Kerr song), 2010
- "Refugees" (The Tears song), 2005
- "The Refugee" (U2 song), 1983
- "Refugee" (Tom Petty and the Heartbreakers song), 1980
- "Refugees" (Van der Graaf Generator song), 1970

== See also ==
- Refuge (disambiguation)
- The Refugees (disambiguation)
- Fugees, an American hip-hop group whose name is derived from "refugees"
- Digital refugee
