= Refuge =

Refuge is a place or state of safety. It may also refer to a more specific meaning:

== Safety ==
- Area of refuge, a location in a building that may be used by occupants in the event of a fire
- Bunker, a defensive fortification designed to protect people from bombs or other attacks
- Mountain hut, a shelter for travelers in mountainous areas, often remote
- Women's refuge, another term for women's shelter
- Refuge (United Kingdom charity), a British charity for female victims of domestic violence
- A place intended to shelter cultural property, in the context of the Hague Convention for the Protection of Cultural Property in the Event of Armed Conflict
- Refuge island, pedestrian safety feature at a road crossing point
- Right of asylum, protection of a person persecuted for political or religious beliefs by another sovereign authority

== Nature and biology ==
- Wildlife refuge, a sanctuary or protected area for wildlife
- Refuge (ecology), a place where an organism can escape from predation
- Refugium (population biology), a location of an isolated or relict population of a previously more widespread species
- Refuge crop, a non-genetically modified food crop planted alongside a genetically modified one to prevent or slow the development of predators resistant to its modified properties by purposely encouraging the mating of species across said crops

== Film and television ==
- Refuge (1923 film), an American silent drama film
- Refuge (1928 film) or Escape, a German silent film
- The Refuge (film), a 2009 French drama directed by François Ozon
- Refuge (2012 film), an American drama directed by Jessica Goldberg
- Refuge (2023 film), an American horror film
- Refuge: Stories of the Selfhelp Home, a 2012 American documentary by Ethan Bensinger
- "Refuge" (Law & Order), a television episode
- "The Refuge" (The Outer Limits), a television episode

== Literature ==
- The Refuge (novel), a 1954 novel by Kenneth Mackenzie
- Refuge: An Unnatural History of Family and Place, a 1991 book by Terry Tempest Williams
- Isaac Asimov's Robot City: Refuge, a 1988 novel by Rob Chilson

== Music ==
- Refuge (band), a side project of the German band Rage
- Refuge Records, a 1980s American record label
- Refuge (EP) or the title song, by Rage, 1994
- Refuge, an album by Sons of Korah, 2014
- Refuge, a soundtrack album by Carbon Based Lifeforms, 2013
- "Refuge", a song by Psy from 4×2=8, 2017
- "Refuge", a song by Steve Wilson from To the Bone, 2017

== Other uses ==
- Refuge, Mississippi
- Refuge, Texas, an unincorporated community in Houston County, Texas
- Eustache de Refuge (1564–1617), Early Modern French courtier, statesman and author
- A controversial evangelical Christian, "ex-gay" conversion therapy program for homosexual teenagers run by Love In Action
- Refuge (Buddhism), the basis of being a Buddhist

== See also ==
- Refugium (disambiguation)
- Refugee (disambiguation)
- City of Refuge (disambiguation)
