= The Complete U2 =

2004 digital box set by U2

Box set by U2
- Released: 23 November 2004
- Recorded: 1978–2004
- Genre: Rock
- Labels: Island, Interscope
- Producers: U2; Martin Hannett; Steve Lillywhite; Brian Eno; Daniel Lanois; Jimmy Iovine; Chris Thomas; Jacknife Lee

U2 chronology
How to Dismantle an Atomic Bomb (2004)	The Complete U2 (2004)	Early Demos (2004)

The Complete U2 is a digital box set by Irish rock band U2. It was released on 23 November 2004 exclusively through the iTunes Store by Apple Inc. in partnership with Island and Interscope Records. The collection has been described as the first major digital-only box set by a recording artist, comprising 446 tracks spanning 1978–2004, including albums, singles, live recordings, rarities and previously unreleased material.

== Background and release ==
Announced alongside the iPod U2 Special Edition, the set was positioned by Apple as the online music industry’s first “Digital Box Set.” At launch it contained 446 tracks organized in 67 digital “groupings” corresponding to U2’s albums, singles and EPs; in iTunes each grouping was labelled The Complete U2. Four titles were exclusive to the set: Unreleased & Rare, Live from Boston 1981, Live from the Point Depot and the Early Demos EP.

A 48-page digital booklet (PDF) accompanied the set, featuring artwork, track listings and liner notes—essays by Bill Flanagan for previously released albums and notes by the Edge for the exclusive content. Design was handled by Dublin firm Four5One Creative, long-time U2 collaborators. (The booklet credits Four5One and Flanagan.)

At release the U.S. price was US$149.99; purchasers of the U2 iPod received a US$50 coupon toward the set. Files were delivered as 128 kbps AAC (.m4a). When Apple expanded its iTunes Plus offering, prior purchasers could upgrade their copies to 256 kbps for a fee, although the box set itself was no longer sold by that time.

== Content ==
Although marketed as “complete,” the package necessarily repeated many tracks across albums, singles and compilations (for example, “One” appears in its album, single and compilation groupings). Several items in U2’s wider discography were not included.

== Errors and issues ==
Contemporary documentation and fan reports noted a number of metadata and audio issues at launch, some later corrected in store updates, others persisting:

- Version discrepancies (e.g., “Stories for Boys” sourced from a compilation rather than the Three EP; “Even Better Than the Real Thing” and “Mysterious Ways” not matching the album edits).
- Truncated audio on certain regional listings (e.g., the opening drum hit of “Sunday Bloody Sunday” in the U.S.).
- Faulty or mislabelled files at launch (e.g., “Who’s Gonna Ride Your Wild Horses (Temple Bar Remix)” resolving to “Paint It, Black”; “A Sort of Homecoming (Live from Wembley)” uploading initially as a 0:12 clip).

Subsequent 256 kbps iTunes Plus upgrades in 2009 introduced further mismatches in some territories (for example, substitution of mixes and mislabelled tracks), with corrections varying by region.

== Withdrawal ==
On 20 December 2007 the set was removed from the iTunes Store worldwide and has not been reissued as a complete package since; existing owners later gained access to iTunes Plus upgrades.

== Disc list ==
Disc	Title	Type	Length	Tracks
1	"Another Day"	single	7:57	2
2	Three	EP	9:24	3
3	"11 O'Clock Tick Tock"	single	7:11	2
4	"A Day Without Me"	single	5:31	2
5	"I Will Follow"	single	7:01	2
6	Boy	studio album	42:13	11
7	"Fire"	single	18:11	4
8	"Gloria"	single	8:04	2
9	October	studio album	41:08	11
10	"A Celebration"	single	5:31	2
11	"New Year's Day"	single	18:10	4
12	War	studio album	43:08	10
13	"Two Hearts Beat as One"	single	18:05	5
14	Under a Blood Red Sky	live album	33:25	8
15	"Pride (In the Name of Love)"	single	19:12	5
16	The Unforgettable Fire	studio album	42:19	10
17	"The Unforgettable Fire" & B-Sides	single	17:27	4
18	Wide Awake in America	EP	20:43	4
19	"With or Without You"	single	14:18	3
20	The Joshua Tree	studio album	50:11	11
21	"I Still Haven't Found What I'm Looking For"	single	12:21	3
22	"Where the Streets Have No Name"	single	16:20	4
23	"Desire"	single	12:39	3
24	Rattle and Hum	double album	1:12:23	17
25	"Angel of Harlem"	single	14:32	3
26	"When Love Comes to Town"	single	15:46	3
27	"All I Want Is You"	single	10:43	2
28	"The Fly"	single	14:33	3
29	Achtung Baby	studio album	55:29	12
30	"Mysterious Ways" & Remixes	single	13:22	7
31	"One"	single	15:27	3
32	"Even Better Than the Real Thing"	single	18:19	4
33	"Even Better Than the Real Thing" Remixes	single	37:15	6
34	"Who's Gonna Ride Your Wild Horses"	single	21:27	4
35	Zooropa	studio album	51:21	10
36	"Lemon" Remixes	single	59:45	9
37	"Stay (Faraway, So Close!)"	single	19:50	4
38	Melon	remix album	47:01	7
39	Original Soundtracks 1	studio album	58:08	14
40	"Miss Sarajevo"	single	19:30	4
41	"Discothèque"	single	14:42	3
42	"Discothèque" Remixes	single	1:05:08	10
43	Pop	studio album	1:00:13	12
44	"Staring at the Sun"	single	14:42	3
45	"Staring at the Sun" Remixes	single	16:34	3
46	"Last Night on Earth"	single	14:01	3
47	"Please"	single	48:48	9
48	"If God Will Send His Angels"	single	22:29	5
49	"Mofo" Remixes	single	37:40	5
50	"Sweetest Thing"	single	22:25	5
51	The Best of 1980–1990	greatest hits	1:04:28	15
52	"Beautiful Day"	single	20:07	5
53	All That You Can't Leave Behind	studio album	53:09	12
54	Hasta la Vista Baby!	live album	1:09:19	14
55	"Stuck in a Moment You Can't Get Out Of"	single	36:06	7
56	"Elevation"	single	19:42	4
57	"Elevation" Remixes	single	31:15	5
58	"Walk On"	single	20:59	4
59	"Electrical Storm"	single	32:05	5
60	The Best of 1990–2000	greatest hits	1:16:20	17
61	"Vertigo"	single	7:01	2
62	"Vertigo" Remixes	single	18:36	4
63	How to Dismantle an Atomic Bomb	studio album	52:58	12
64	Unreleased & Rare	compilation	1:17:12	18
65	Live from Boston 1981	live album	54:34	13
66	Live from the Point Depot	live album	1:39:44	21
67	Early Demos	EP	13:14	3
Total:	20 albums 3 EPs		28:00:00 (approx.)	446

=== Digital box set-exclusive albums ===
The following albums are only officially available as part of this set:

==== Unreleased & Rare ====
Unreleased & Rare compiles previously unreleased and hard-to-find tracks, many originating from the All That You Can't Leave Behind and How to Dismantle an Atomic Bomb sessions; some edits and remixes from singles and compilations are also included.

No.	Title	From	Length
1.	"Levitate"	All That You Can't Leave Behind sessions	5:09
2.	"Love You Like Mad"	All That You Can't Leave Behind sessions	4:17
3.	"Smile"	How to Dismantle an Atomic Bomb sessions	3:17
4.	"Flower Child"	All That You Can't Leave Behind sessions	4:54
5.	"Beautiful Ghost / Introduction to Songs of Experience"	The Joshua Tree sessions	3:52
6.	"Jesus Christ"	Rattle and Hum sessions	3:12
7.	"Xanax and Wine"	How to Dismantle an Atomic Bomb sessions	4:39
8.	"All Because of You" (Alternate version)	How to Dismantle an Atomic Bomb sessions	3:35
9.	"Native Son"	How to Dismantle an Atomic Bomb sessions	3:08
10.	"Yahweh" (Alternate version)	How to Dismantle an Atomic Bomb sessions	4:31
11.	"Sometimes You Can't Make It on Your Own" (Alternate version)	How to Dismantle an Atomic Bomb sessions	5:30
12.	"Numb" (Radio edit)	"Numb" promotional single	3:57
13.	"Bass Trap" (Edit)	The Best of 1980–1990 B-sides	3:33
14.	"Night and Day" (Twilight Remix)	"Night and Day" promotional single	5:20
15.	"Numb" (Gimme Some More Dignity Mix edit)	The Best of 1990–2000 B-sides	5:50
16.	"Salomé" (Zooromancer Remix edit)	The Best of 1990–2000 B-sides	5:51
17.	"Christmas (Baby Please Come Home)"	A Very Special Christmas (1987)	2:19
18.	"Stateless"	The Million Dollar Hotel: Music from the Motion Picture	4:05

==== Live from Boston 1981 ====
Live from Boston 1981 was recorded at the Paradise Rock Club on 6 March 1981 during the Boy Tour. Several performances had previously appeared as B-sides or bonus tracks on various singles.

No.	Title	Originally released on	Length
1.	"The Ocean"		2:22
2.	"11 O'Clock Tick Tock"		5:02
3.	"Touch"		3:01
4.	"An Cat Dubh / Into the Heart"		7:54
5.	"Another Time, Another Place"		4:33
6.	"The Cry/The Electric Co."	"Fire" single	4:53
7.	"Things to Make and Do"		3:05
8.	"Stories for Boys"	"Sweetest Thing" single	3:03
9.	"Twilight"		4:27
10.	"I Will Follow"	"Gloria" single	3:58
11.	"Out of Control"	"I Will Follow" single	5:18
12.	"11 O'Clock Tick Tock" (encore)	"Fire" single	5:01
13.	"The Ocean" (encore)	"Fire" single	2:11

==== Live from the Point Depot ====
Live from the Point Depot documented U2’s New Year's Eve performance at Dublin’s Point Depot in 1989, officially released here after years of circulation as a bootleg recording.

==== Early Demos ====
Early Demos

EP from The Complete U2 box set by U2
- Released: 23 November 2004
- Recorded: November 1978
- Length: 13:14
- Producer: Barry Devlin

U2 chronology
The Complete U2 (2004)	Early Demos (2004)	Love: Live from the Point Depot (2004)

Early Demos contains three studio demos produced by Barry Devlin and recorded at Keystone Studios in November 1978. Two tracks (“Street Mission” and “The Fool”) are otherwise unavailable on U2 studio albums; “Shadows and Tall Trees” later appeared on Boy (1980).

No.	Title	Length
1.	"Street Mission"	4:17
2.	"Shadows and Tall Trees" (Demo)	4:40
3.	"The Fool"	4:15

== See also ==
- U2 discography
- List of U2 songs
