= A Celebration =

1982 single by U2

Single by U2
- B-side: "Trash, Trampoline and the Party Girl"
- Released: 22 March 1982
- Recorded: 1982
- Genre: Rock, post-punk
- Length: 2:57
- Label: CBS Ireland; Island; Polystar
- Songwriter: U2
- Producer: Steve Lillywhite

U2 singles chronology
"Gloria" (1981)	"A Celebration" (1982)	"New Year's Day" (1983)

Music video
- "A Celebration" on YouTube

Alternative cover
- Japan cover

"A Celebration" is a song by Irish rock band U2. It was released as a non-album single in March 1982, between the records October (1981) and War (1983). The song's music video was filmed at the Kilmainham Gaol former prison in Dublin. The single reached number 47 on the UK Singles Chart and number 15 on the Irish Singles Chart. "Trash, Trampoline and the Party Girl", commonly shortened to "Party Girl", was released on the single's B-side. It later became a live favourite with fans.

U2 have re-released "A Celebration" on a few occasions: in 2004 with the digital box set The Complete U2; in 2008 on a bonus disc with the remastered edition of October; and in 2022 on vinyl for Record Store Day.

== Composition and theme ==
"A Celebration" runs for 2:57. According to Universal Music Publishing Group's sheet music published at Musicnotes.com, it is played in common time at a tempo of 157 beats per minute in the key of B minor. The vocals extend from a low note of A_{4} to a high of B_{5}.

In a 1983 interview, lead vocalist Bono indicated that the song was the source of controversy due to misinterpretation of the verse "I believe in a third World War / I believe in the atomic bomb / I believe in the powers that be / But they won't overpower me" by fans who questioned his motives. Bono explained, "all I was saying was that the realities of the bomb must be faced."

== Release ==
"A Celebration" was released on 22 March 1982 as a non-album single. The song "Trash, Trampoline and the Party Girl" was featured on the B-side of the single, except in Japan, where the song "Fire" was included on the B-side instead.

"A Celebration" was absent from any of the group's compilations until the digital box set The Complete U2 in 2004. The song was also included on the remastered release of October in 2008.

"A Celebration" was reissued on Record Store Day on 22 April 2022 to commemorate the 40th anniversary of its original release. It was pressed on 12-inch, 180-gram vinyl and contained four tracks: two versions of "A Celebration" on the A-side (the original version and a studio outtake), and two versions of "Trash, Trampoline and the Party Girl" on the B-side (the studio version and a live performance from 2015).

=== "Trash, Trampoline and the Party Girl" ===
"Trash, Trampoline and the Party Girl", commonly known as "Party Girl", was the B-side to "A Celebration". The song runs for 2:32 (2 minutes, 32 seconds). According to Universal Music Publishing Group's sheet music published at Musicnotes.com, it is played in common time at a tempo of 152 beats per minute in the key of D major. The vocals extend from a low note of A_{4} to a high of E_{6}.

In contrast to the A-side, after its live debut on February 26, 1983 at the first War Tour concert, "Party Girl" became a regular during the encores. This happened despite the fact that after the initial performance, Bono stated "that is the first and probably last time we play that song." It continued to be a regular for the next couple of tours (earning an inclusion on the live album Under a Blood Red Sky and the concert film U2 Live at Red Rocks: Under a Blood Red Sky) and has appeared sporadically at U2 concerts since then, usually for special occasions such as the birthday of a band member. The only tours on which it was never played were the PopMart Tour in 1997–1998, The Joshua Tree Tour 2017 and 2019, and the Experience + Innocence Tour in 2018 and it is the most frequently performed b-side in U2's live history, and the only b-side to be played more than a hundred times. Only one non-album song has been played more times, the 1980 single "11 O'Clock Tick Tock". On numerous occasions in the band's live history, U2 have invited fans on-stage to perform the song by playing the acoustic guitar part.

"Party Girl" can also be found on the 2008 deluxe edition bonus CD of October, the live albums Live from the Point Depot and Live from Paris and the compilation albums The Best of 1980–1990 and Medium, Rare & Remastered.

== Music video ==
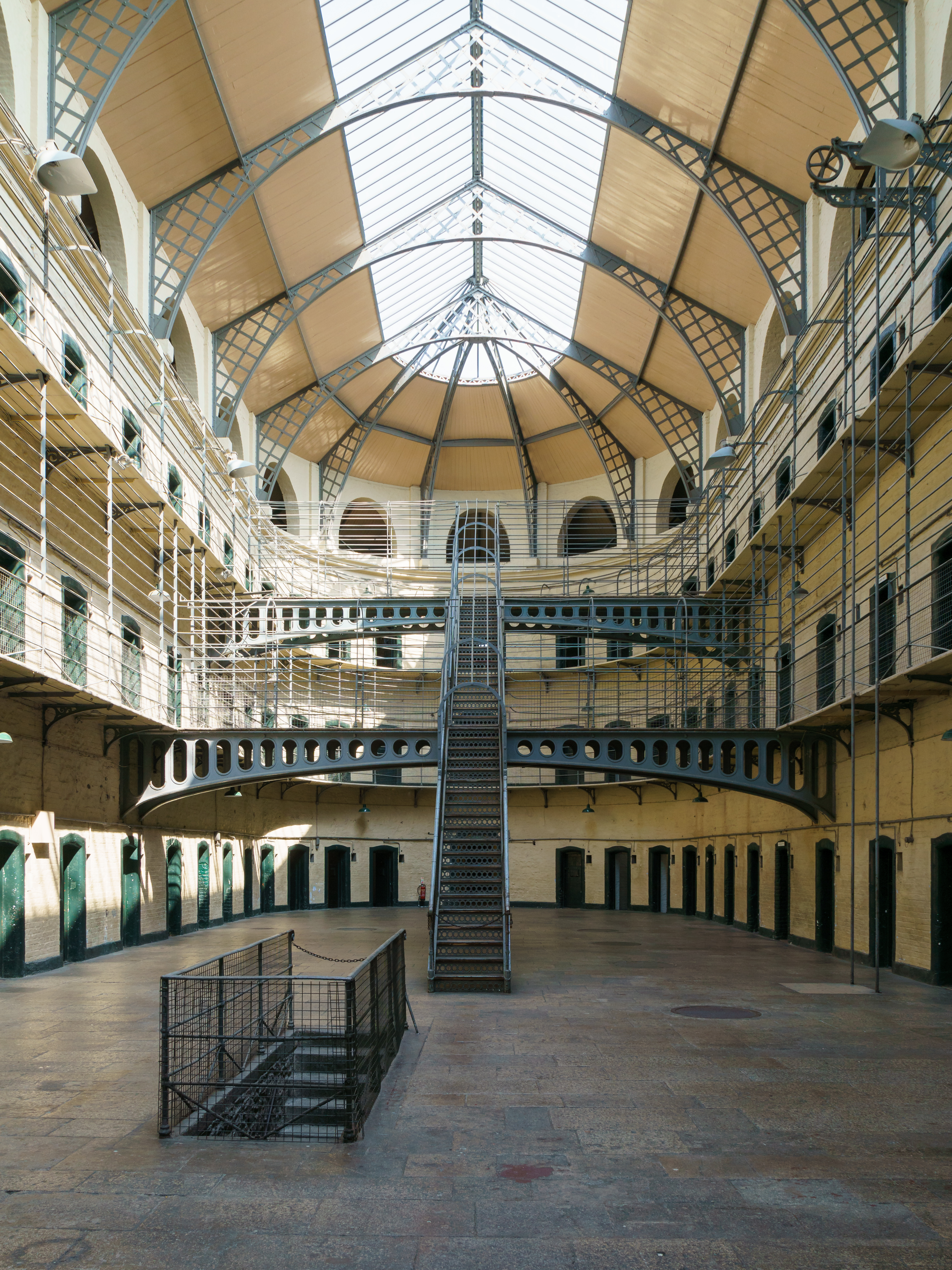
The song's music video was filmed at Kilmainham Gaol.

The song's music video was filmed at Dublin's Kilmainham Gaol, a former prison, in April 1982, and it was directed by Meiert Avis. Drummer Larry Mullen, Jr. said of the music video in 1983: "We did a video of it. We went to this prison in Dublin, where the 1916 uprising took place, called Kilmainham Jail, and filmed it with the idea of breaking out. It was very much a look at ourselves. Like when we were in school and everyone was telling us 'you're crap' and we couldn't get a record deal, it was the triumph of breaking through."

== Live performances ==
"A Celebration" made its live debut in late February 1982 and sporadically appeared at concerts throughout that year until it became a regular of the Pre-War Tour during the month of December. It then appeared at some early dates of the War Tour in February and March 1983. Its last live appearance was on November 30, 1983, in Tokyo.

== Formats and track listings ==
7": Ireland / WIP6770
No.	Title	Length
1.	"A Celebration"	2:57
2.	"Trash, Trampoline and the Party Girl"	2:32

7": Polystar / 7S-69
No.	Title	Length
1.	"A Celebration"	2:56
2.	"Fire"	3:50

== Charts ==
Chart (1982)	Peak position
Irish Singles Chart	15
UK Singles Chart	47

== See also ==
- List of covers of U2 songs – Party Girl
