= Red Light (U2 song) =

1983 song by U2

Song by U2

from the album War
- Released: 28 February 1983
- Recorded: September–November 1982
- Studio: Windmill Lane (Dublin)
- Genre: Rock
- Length: 3:46
- Label: Island
- Composer: U2
- Producer: Steve Lillywhite

"Red Light" is a song by rock band U2. It is the eighth track from their 1983 album War.

== Writing and recording ==
Taking advantage of American musical group Kid Creole and the Coconuts being in Dublin, U2 invited the trumpet player to work on "Red Light", thinking that it would freshen up the sound of the band. Three singers joined as well. Bono said, "We had the studio lit red for effect, and one Coconut took her top off and sang in what looked like a ballerina's bra. The boys from Ireland had difficulty breathing."

== Reception ==
Sid Smith of the BBC wrote of the song, "U2's palette broadens on 'Red Light' with backing vocals from Kid Creole's Coconuts no less, and some equally superfluous trumpet – the latter making a tokenistic jazz noise atop the impervious surface of the band's default setting, that only loosens up enough to work effectively by the time the track is fading-out." Sputnikmusic contributor, John Cruz, felt the song indicated a change of tone on the album, saying: "The album's mood becomes looser, with Bono chasing hopeless love in Red Light".
