= Under a Blood Red Sky =

1983 live mini-album by U2

Live album (mini) by U2
- Released: 21 November 1983
- Recorded: 6 May – 20 August 1983
- Venues: Red Rocks Amphitheatre (Morrison, Colorado); Freilichtbühne Loreley (St. Goarshausen, Germany); Orpheum Theatre (Boston, Massachusetts)
- Genre: Post-punk
- Length: 35:29
- Label: Island
- Producer: Jimmy Iovine

U2 chronology
War (1983)	Under a Blood Red Sky (1983)	U2 Live at Red Rocks: Under a Blood Red Sky (1984)

Singles from Under a Blood Red Sky
- 1. "I Will Follow" Released: 20 August 1983

Professional ratings
Review scores
Source	Rating
AllMusic	3.5/5 stars
Chicago Tribune	3.5/4 stars
Entertainment Weekly	A−
Mojo	4/5 stars
The New Zealand Herald	8/10
Pitchfork	9.0/10
Record Collector	4/5 stars
Rolling Stone	4/5 stars
The Rolling Stone Album Guide	3/5 stars
The Village Voice	A−

Under a Blood Red Sky is a live mini-album by Irish rock band U2, produced by Jimmy Iovine and released on 21 November 1983. The record's eight tracks were compiled from three concerts during the group's 1983 War Tour, including two songs from their 5 June performance at Red Rocks Amphitheatre. The concert film U2 Live at Red Rocks: Under a Blood Red Sky, recorded at the same Red Rocks show, was released as a companion to the live album. Both releases helped establish U2's reputation globally as a renowned live act.

== History ==
The album consists of live recordings from three shows on the band's War Tour, from Colorado and Boston in the US and from Germany.

An accompanying concert video entitled Live at Red Rocks: Under a Blood Red Sky was released the following year. The film was recorded entirely at the outdoor Red Rocks Amphitheatre on 5 June 1983, while two songs from that show are included on the album.

The title is taken from the lyrics of the song "New Year's Day", originally released on U2's War album.

The album was re-released on 29 September 2008 as a remastered CD with a DVD of the Red Rocks concert.

In November 2023, the band celebrated the 40th anniversary of the album with a newly remastered release on Record Store Day Black Friday.

== Track listing ==
All tracks are written by U2, with lyrics by Bono.

Side one
No.	Title	Recording location/date	Length
1.	"Gloria" (from October)	Red Rocks Amphitheatre on 5 June 1983	4:32
2.	"11 O'Clock Tick Tock" (single)	Orpheum Theatre, Boston, Massachusetts, on 6 May 1983	4:34
3.	"I Will Follow" (from Boy)	Freilichtbühne Loreley, Sankt Goarshausen, Germany, on 20 August 1983	3:36
4.	"Party Girl" (B-side of "A Celebration" single)	Red Rocks Amphitheatre on 5 June 1983	2:52

Side two
No.	Title	Recording location/date	Length
1.	"Sunday Bloody Sunday" (from War)	Sankt Goarshausen, Germany, on 20 August 1983	4:55
2.	"The Electric Co." (from Boy)	Sankt Goarshausen, Germany, on 20 August 1983	5:18
3.	"New Year's Day" (from War)	Sankt Goarshausen, Germany, on 20 August 1983	4:29
4.	"40" (from War)	Sankt Goarshausen, Germany, on 20 August 1983	3:36

Notes
During the performance of "The Electric Co.", Bono included a 27-second snippet of Stephen Sondheim's "Send in the Clowns". When Under a Blood Red Sky was released, U2 failed to get permission and pay the appropriate licensing and royalty fees to include Sondheim's tune on the album. When Sondheim objected, U2 agreed to pay a $50,000 (US) penalty for the unauthorized use and to press all future releases with a new version that did not include the snippet.

Essentially, there are now two versions of the vinyl album: the original with the full "The Electric Co." running 5:18 and the edited version which runs 4:51. However, the various CDs pressed around the world all vary in the versions of the song that are included.

- The trifold digipack CD pressed in the U.S. correctly lists "The Electric Co." at 4:51 and contains the edited version of the song.
- Later U.S. CD pressings in the standard jewel box format incorrectly list "The Electric Co." at 5:18, but have the edited version of the song.
- Some, and perhaps all, European pressings of the CD correctly list "The Electric Co." at 5:18 and have the unedited version of the song (the same is likely true of other worldwide CD pressings).
- An Australian pressing of the CD lists the track at 4:57, but the song actually runs the full 5:18.
- The remastered editions all contain the edited version of the song.

On the streaming platforms YouTube Music, Spotify, and Apple Music the album contains the edited version of the song.

== Personnel ==
- Bono – lead vocals
- The Edge – guitar, piano on "New Year's Day", backing vocals, bass guitar on "40"
- Adam Clayton – bass guitar, guitar on "40"
- Larry Mullen Jr. – drums

== Charts ==
=== Weekly charts ===
Chart	Peak position
Australia (Kent Music Report)	2
Belgian Albums (Ultratop Flanders)	39
Belgian Albums (Ultratop Wallonia)	51
Canada Top Albums/CDs (RPM)	22
Dutch Albums (Album Top 100)	5
German Albums (Offizielle Top 100)	20
Irish Albums (IRMA)	43
Italian Albums (FIMI)	24
New Zealand Albums (RMNZ)	1
Portuguese Albums (AFP)	20
Spanish Albums (Promusicae)	36
Swedish Albums (Sverigetopplistan)	22
UK Albums (OCC)	2
US Billboard Top LPs & Tape	28

Chart (2025–2026)	Peak position
Greek Albums (IFPI)	80

=== Year-end charts ===
Chart (1984)	Position
New Zealand Albums (RMNZ)	3

== Certifications ==
Region	Certification	Certified units/sales
Australia (ARIA)	4× Platinum	280,000^{^}
Belgium (BRMA)	Gold	25,000^{*}
Canada (Music Canada)	2× Platinum	200,000^{^}
France (SNEP)	Platinum	300,000^{*}
Germany (BVMI)	Platinum	500,000^{^}
New Zealand (RMNZ)	Gold	7,500^{^}
Spain (Promusicae)	Gold	50,000^{^}
United Kingdom (BPI)	3× Platinum	900,000^{^}
United States (RIAA)	3× Platinum	3,000,000^{^}
^{*} Sales figures based on certification alone.^{^} Shipments figures based on certification alone.

== See also ==
- U2 discography
