= War (U2 album) =

Studio album by U2
- Released: 28 February 1983
- Recorded: September–November 1982
- Studios: Windmill Lane (Dublin, Ireland)
- Genre: Post-punk
- Length: 42:03
- Label: Island
- Producer: Steve Lillywhite

U2 chronology
October (1981)	War (1983)	Under a Blood Red Sky (1983)

Singles from War
- 1. "New Year's Day" Released: 10 January 1983; 2. "Two Hearts Beat as One" Released: 21 March 1983; 3. "Sunday Bloody Sunday" Released: 21 March 1983; 4. "40" Released: 20 August 1983 (Germany only)

War is the third studio album by Irish rock band U2. It was produced by Steve Lillywhite, and was released on 28 February 1983 on Island Records. The album is regarded as U2's first overtly political album, in part because of songs like "Sunday Bloody Sunday" and "New Year's Day", as well as the title, which stems from the band's perception of the world at the time; lead vocalist Bono stated that "war seemed to be the motif for 1982."

Recorded from September to November 1982 at Windmill Lane Studios, it was produced by Lillywhite and is the group's third consecutive album developed at the studio with the producer. While the central themes of U2's previous albums Boy and October were adolescence and spirituality, respectively, War focused on both the physical aspects of warfare, and the emotional after-effects. Musically, it is also harsher than the band's previous releases.

War was a commercial success, knocking Michael Jackson's Thriller from the top of the UK charts to become U2's first number-one album there. In the United States, it reached number 12 and became the band's first album certified gold. War received generally favourable reviews, although some British journalists criticised it. The band supported the album with the War Tour through the end of 1983. In 2008, a remastered edition of War was released. In 2012, the album was ranked 223rd on Rolling Stone's list of "The 500 Greatest Albums of All Time".

== Recording ==
In August 1982, Bono and his wife Alison Hewson honeymooned in Jamaica. It has been noted that it was not a typical honeymoon, as Bono reportedly worked on the lyrics for the upcoming album. The lyrics to "New Year's Day" had its origins in a love song Bono wrote for his wife, but the song was reshaped and inspired by the Polish Solidarity movement. The band began recording the album in September 1982 at Windmill Lane Studios in Dublin with producer Steve Lillywhite, their third consecutive record at the studio with the producer.

The album's opener, "Sunday Bloody Sunday", an ardent protest song, stems from a guitar riff and lyric written by the Edge in 1982. Following an argument with his girlfriend, and a period of doubt in his own song-writing abilities, the Edge – "feeling depressed... channeled [his] fear and frustration and self-loathing into a piece of music." Early versions of the song opened with the line, "Don't talk to me about the rights of the IRA, UDA". After Bono had reworked the lyrics, the band recorded the song. The opening drum pattern soon developed into the song's hook. A local violinist, Steve Wickham, approached the Edge one morning at a bus stop and asked if U2 had any need for a violin on their next album. In the studio for only half a day, Wickham's electric violin became the final instrumental contribution to the song.

During the sessions for "Sunday Bloody Sunday", Lillywhite encouraged drummer Larry Mullen, Jr. to use a click track, but Mullen was firmly against the idea. A chance meeting with Andy Newmark (of Sly & the Family Stone) – a drummer who used a click track religiously – changed Mullen's mind. Mullen used the click track to stay in time for other songs on the album. Mullen said of the album in a 1983 interview, "I think the drumming has always been pretty simple, I don't think it needs to be flashy. For War I use a click track, something I haven't used before, it's a way of keeping time in my headphones. When I listened to the music in time with the click track I knew I had to bring it down to the real basics. Hopefully for the next LP it will be more complicated, I'll move on. I think of it as a musical progression for myself because I learned a lot recording this album, just about my own style and that's what I wanted to do. I think there is a definite style on War where there isn't on the previous albums."

Three of the tracks featured backing vocals by the Coconuts, of Kid Creole and the Coconuts. In the words of Steve Lillywhite, "they just happened to be in Dublin on tour, so we hung out with them and they came in and sang on 'Surrender'. So it was sort of random – this serious Irish rock band having the Coconuts on their album."

The studio version of "40" was recorded during the final hours of the recording sessions in November 1982. Bassist Adam Clayton had already left the studio, and the three remaining band members decided they did not have a good song to end the album. Bono, the Edge, and Mullen Jr. quickly recorded the song with the Edge playing both the guitar and bass parts. Bono called the song "40" as he based the lyrics on Psalm 40. In live versions of the song, the Edge and Clayton switch roles, as Clayton plays guitar and Edge plays the bass.

== Composition ==
The sound of War is arguably harsher than that of the band's other albums. A major reason for this is that the Edge uses far less delay and echo than in previous and subsequent works.

"Sunday Bloody Sunday" (1983)
The opening 28 seconds of "Sunday Bloody Sunday", featuring the martial drumbeat, raw guitar, and bleak lyrics.

War opens with the protest song "Sunday Bloody Sunday". The song describes the horror felt by an observer of The Troubles in Northern Ireland, specifically Bloody Sunday. Already a departure from the themes of innocence and spirituality displayed on the group's first two albums, "Sunday Bloody Sunday" introduces the album with a startling, military-esque drum beat by Larry Mullen, Jr., a fuming solo by the Edge that segues into staccato bursts reminiscent of machine gun fire, and pointed lyrical couplets such as: "And today the millions cry / We eat and drink while tomorrow they die." The album as a whole is more direct than the ambient October. Bono said in 1983,

A lot of the songs on our last album were quite abstract, but War is intentionally more direct, more specific. But you can still take the title on a lot of different levels. We're not only interested in the physical aspects of war. The emotional effects are just as important, 'the trenches dug within our hearts'. People have become numb to violence. Watching the television, it's hard to tell the difference between fact and fiction. One minute you see something being shot on The Professionals, and the next you see someone falling through a window after being shot on the news. One is fiction and one is real life, but we're becoming so used to the fiction that we become numb to the real thing. War could be the story of a broken home, a family at war.

"Sunday Bloody Sunday" is considered to be among the greatest political protest songs, and has remained a staple of U2's live concerts in the years since.

"Seconds" is a song about nuclear proliferation, and the possibility that Armageddon could occur by an accident. The track contains a sample from the 1982 documentary Soldier Girls. The Edge sings the first two stanzas, making it one of the rare occasions on which he sings lead vocals.

In continuing the political motif of the album, "New Year's Day" is about the Polish solidarity movement. In 2004, Rolling Stone placed it as the 435th greatest song of all time. The song remains a staple of the band's live set, and is their third-most frequently performed song behind "I Will Follow" and "Pride (In the Name of Love)".

"Like a Song..." was intended as a message to those who believed that the band was too worthy, sincere and not "punk" enough. Bono speculated that the song's punk attitude would have made more sense in the 1950s and 1960s, as opposed to the "dressing up" of the genre in the early 1980s. "Like a Song..." was only played live once.

"Drowning Man" is the fifth track on the album. It was never performed live, although there are also unconfirmed reports that it was performed at a concert in 1983.

Other songs concern topics such as prostitution ("Red Light") and love ("Two Hearts Beat as One").

== Release ==
The album was first released on 28 February 1983. The original cassette release contains the entire album on each side.

=== Packaging and title ===
The album was titled War for several reasons; in 1982, Bono said, "War seemed to be the motif for 1982," adding that "Everywhere you looked, from the Falklands to the Middle East and South Africa, there was war. By calling the album War we're giving people a slap in the face and at the same time getting away from the cosy image a lot of people have of U2." The Edge said that "It's a heavy title. It's blunt. It's not something that's safe, so it could backfire. It's the sort of subject matter that people can really take a dislike to. But we wanted to take a more dangerous course, fly a bit closer to the wind, so I think the title is appropriate." The boy on the cover is Peter Rowen (brother of Bono's friend, Guggi). He also appears on the covers of Boy, Three, The Best of 1980–1990, Early Demos and many singles. Bono described the reasoning behind the cover: "Instead of putting tanks and guns on the cover, we've put a child's face. War can also be a mental thing, an emotional thing between loves. It doesn't have to be a physical thing." The Italian Communist Party used a modified version of the cover design on a 1984 electoral campaign poster.

=== Singles ===
In January 1983, "New Year's Day" was released internationally as the album's lead single. The single reached the top ten in the UK, and was the first release by the band to chart on the Billboard Hot 100. In March 1983, "Two Hearts Beat as One" and "Sunday Bloody Sunday" were released as singles in different regions. "Two Hearts Beat as One", a single in the US, UK, and Australia, reached number 18 on the UK Singles Chart; "Sunday Bloody Sunday", released in Germany and the Netherlands, reached number 3 on the Netherlands' charts. "40" was not released as a commercial single, but rather as a promotional single in Germany.

== Reception ==
Contemporary professional ratings
Review scores
Source	Rating
Albuquerque Journal	7/10
The Houston Chronicle	4/5 stars
Miami Herald	Pick
Orlando Sentinel	5/5 stars
Philadelphia Daily News	4/5 stars
Record Mirror	3/5 stars
Rolling Stone	4/5 stars
Sounds	2.5/5 stars
The Village Voice	B+
Windsor Star	A−

In a favourable review in Rolling Stone, J. D. Considine said, "the album's musical strengths are largely the product of well-honed arrangements and carefully balanced dynamics". He added, "the songs here stand up against anything on the Clash's London Calling in terms of sheer impact, and the fact that U2 can sweep the listener up in the same sort of enthusiastic romanticism that fuels the band's grand gestures is an impressive feat. For once, not having all the answers seems a bonus." Critic Dave Marsh said that despite not "match[ing] the pure chilling intensity" of Boy and Lillywhite's production not giving the guitars enough prominence, War was a "solid set". He complimented War for its "passion and commitment" and potent songs, calling it "as good as any post-new wave rock around". He concluded, "It's rare to see a band sustain such courageous behavior through three albums and still wind up on the brink of stardom."

Robert Christgau of The Village Voice wrote that "the deadly European virus that's always tainted this band turns out to be their characteristic melodic device", adding, "The Edge becomes a tuneful guitarist by the simple expedient of not soloing, and if Bono has too many Gregorian moments his conviction still carries the music." Dan Kennedy of the Orlando Sentinel said that on War the group "more clearly define its philosophical stance" and that below the sense of despair on the surface is a "voice of hope that flies in the face of most rock postures". Brett Milano of The Boston Globe called War an "album of tension and conflict", with a "riveting opening" in "Sunday Bloody Sunday" and "one of the year's most affecting love songs" in "Two Hearts Beat as One". He said the "arrangements are models of invention" and that the Edge's "expressive guitar is still the heart of U2's sound". Milano found the only weakness to be the "anti-climactic acoustic songs" that close each side. In a review published in the Albuquerque Journal, Rick Shefchik said, "The arrangements on this precocious young band's third album are brighter than before", giving their politically motivated songs a "pop sound they once seemed to be avoiding".

Bill Ashton of the Miami Herald called War one the year's best records and said it was the band's "most consistent album yet, full of plaintive lyrics and fiery guitar work" and a rhythm section that "sharpened noticeably" since October. He complimented the lyrics for never being heavy-handed despite touching on "revolution, life in the age of The Bomb, love and faith". Philip Smith of The New Zealand Herald commended the band's maturing sound and labeled the album "a classic". He concluded his review, "So U2 have set out to make a big statement on a subject close to the Irishmen's hearts – and they have succeeded." Terry Atkinson of the Los Angeles Times was disappointed by the "gradual dissolution of [U2's] sound" and found that only the two songs that "hold to the group's established style" ("Sunday Bloody Sunday" and "New Year's Day") were "thoroughly satisfying". The review concluded, "In trying to escape formula, U-2 too often loses the battle, but this willingness to try the new, added to its still-bracing basic thrust, indicates how distinctive the band is even in failure."

Several reviews were negative in the United Kingdom. Gavin Martin of NME compared the album to U2's debut, stating that "where Boy shone and flowed War is dull and static", and "where Boy propelled lucid pellets of fire and imagination War cranks out blank liberal awareness"; he felt that after the single "New Year's Day", which he considered to be "their finest single since 'I Will Follow'", War "declines quite dramatically", ultimately calling the album "another example of rock music's impotence and decay". Dave McCullough of Sounds shared a similar point of view, recognising that the two singles were "by far the strongest tracks" on War, but that "for the remainder, they are a (dejected sounding) mixture of the incomplete, the experimental (in the simplest sense) and the plain sub-standard." By contrast, Liam Mackey of Hot Press in the band's native Ireland said that War "totally eclipses" the group's first two albums and called it a "major leap forward, conceptually and technically". He praised the "resourcefulness and imagination" of the Edge's guitar playing and said the album "offers watertight evidence of the band's standing as a genuinely original force in contemporary music".

The album placed sixth on The Village Voice's 1983 year-end Pazz & Jop critics' poll.

== Commercial performance ==
War was a commercial success. In its opening week, the record debuted at number one in the UK, supplanting Michael Jackson's Thriller to become the group's first number-one album in the UK. In April, it was certified gold in the UK by the British Phonographic Industry. The album charted on the UK Albums Chart for 148 weeks. In the United States, the album entered the Billboard Top LPs & Tape chart at number 91, and eventually peaked at number 12. In total, the album sold 11 million copies.

== War Tour ==
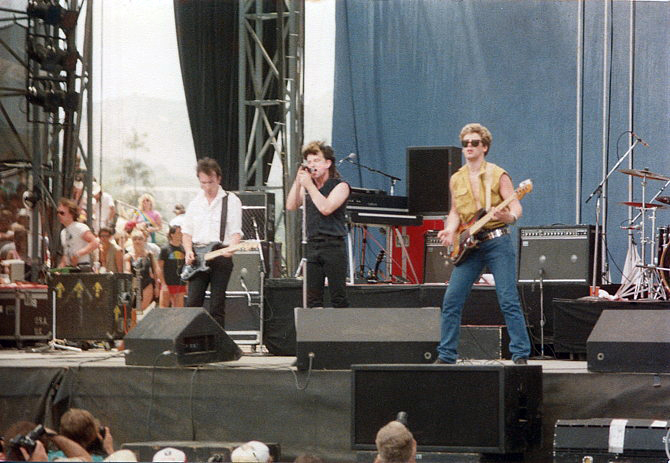
U2 performing at the US Festival in May 1983

In support of the album, the band began touring on 1 December 1982. The first month of shows, referred to as the "Pre-War Tour", preceded the album's release and the bulk of the tour, and was meant to showcase and test the new songs in a live setting. The War Tour proper began on 26 February 1983 and lasted until 30 November of that year. In total, the band played 110 gigs in Europe, the US, and Japan to promote War. Over the course of the tour, the band began to play progressively larger venues, moving from clubs to halls to arenas. Bono attempted to engage the growing audiences with theatrical, often dangerous antics, climbing scaffoldings and lighting rigs and jumping into the audience. The sight of Bono waving a white flag during performances of "Sunday Bloody Sunday" became the tour's iconic image. The band played several dates at large European and American music festivals, including a performance at the US Festival on Memorial Day weekend for an audience of 125,000 people. The group's 5 June 1983 concert at Red Rocks Amphitheatre on a rain-soaked evening was singled out by Rolling Stone as one "50 Moments that Changed the History of Rock and Roll". The show was recorded for the concert video Live at Red Rocks and was one of several concerts from the tour captured on their live album Under a Blood Red Sky. Both releases received extensive play on the radio and MTV, expanding the band's audience and showcasing their prowess as a live act. During the tour, the group established a new tradition by closing concerts with "40", during which the Edge and Clayton would switch instruments and the band members would leave the stage one-by-one as the crowd continued to sing the refrain "How long to sing this song?". The War Tour was U2's first profitable tour, grossing about $2 million.

== Legacy ==
Retrospective professional ratings
Review scores
Source	Rating
AllMusic	5/5 stars
The Austin Chronicle	5/5 stars
The A.V. Club	A−
Blender	5/5 stars
Chicago Tribune	3.5/4 stars
Entertainment Weekly	B+
Pitchfork	8.9/10
Rolling Stone	4.5/5 stars
The Rolling Stone Album Guide	4.5/5 stars
Select	5/5

In 1989, War was ranked number 40 on Rolling Stone's list of "The 100 Greatest Albums of the '80s". In 2003, the magazine ranked War 221st on its list of "The 500 Greatest Albums of All Time", describing it as "the band's most overtly political album... charged with explosive, passionate guitar rock". An updated version of the list in 2012 re-ranked the album at number 223. Slant Magazine ranked War 94th on its list of the "Best Albums of the 1980s."

Chicago Tribune critic Greg Kot deemed War a "breakthrough" for U2 in which "the band's passion comes through with gripping clarity." Stephen Thomas Erlewine of AllMusic viewed it as U2's first album to achieve "greatness", finding that their lyrics – which he said "came across as grandstanding" in U2's earlier work – cohered into a "remarkably clear" vision on War and, complemented by the band's "muscular, forceful performances", succeed at "making the universal sound personal". J. D. Considine and Nathan Brackett's overview of U2's discography in the 2004 edition of The Rolling Stone Album Guide states that with War, the band brought more focus to their songwriting and effectively balanced personal and political subject matter, while also creating a musically "richer and more varied" album than October.

Reviewing War upon its 2008 reissue, Blender's Jon Dolan opined that it marked a tonal shift from U2's more "inwardly focused" previous albums and demonstrated the band's newfound "titanic moral and sonic force", while Rolling Stone's David Fricke commented that on War, "U2 sound like stars, not aspirants, ready for their money shot". Steven Hyden, writing for The A.V. Club, said that the album showed Bono's mastery of "the art of the grand symbolic gesture" through "his inspirational iconography on anthems like 'Sunday Bloody Sunday' and 'New Year's Day'". Pitchfork reviewer Joe Tangari concluded, "The U2 we've known ever since had arrived on War, and even today it sounds vital."

The album was described by Simon Reynolds as the record where the band "turned pacifism itself into a crusade". According to Treble writer Jeff Terich, War served as "a triumphant close to [U2's] post-punk trilogy" and "the dividing line between U2, the young Dublin new wave act and U2, the heroic stadium rock band". In a dissenting analysis, Bob Stanley believed the band had actually deviated from post-punk's regionalism and rejection of pop music universality by achieving progressively higher levels of international success. He wrote that, beginning with War, "it became increasingly hard to tell what U2 stood for, or what their purpose was – their vastness and their complete avoidance of detail made them hard to read, let alone love. One day someone will explain to Bono that pop is always more expressive when it is trying to mend a broken heart than when it's trying to save the world."

== Track listing ==
All tracks are written by U2.

Side one
No.	Title	Length
1.	"Sunday Bloody Sunday"	4:38
2.	"Seconds"	3:09
3.	"New Year's Day"	5:37
4.	"Like a Song..."	4:48
5.	"Drowning Man"	4:12

Side two
No.	Title	Length
1.	"The Refugee"	3:40
2.	"Two Hearts Beat as One"	4:00
3.	"Red Light"	3:46
4.	"Surrender"	5:34
5.	"40"	2:36
Total length:		42:03

In 1993, Mobile Fidelity Sound Lab remastered the album from the original analog master tapes and released it on a 24kt gold plated CD. The original master recording has slightly different running times:

- "Seconds" runs 3:22, adding 11.5 seconds in the break section (beginning at approx. 2:01)
- "New Year's Day" runs 5:38, leaving in the one measure before the guitar break (beginning at approx. 3:27)
- "Like a Song..." runs 5:00, extending the playout section (beginning at approx. 4:45)
- "Surrender" runs 5:34, but is erroneously identified on the back of the album as being 6:01 in length

== 2008 remastered edition ==
Following the remastered re-release of The Joshua Tree in 2007, it was rumoured that the band would also remaster and re-release War, along with the albums Boy and October. The remastered album was released on 21 July 2008 in the UK, with the US version following it the next day. It was released in three different formats:

1. Standard format: A single CD with re-mastered audio and restored packaging. Includes a 16-page booklet featuring previously unseen photos, full lyrics and new liner notes by Niall Stokes. The 10 tracks match the previous release of the album.
2. Deluxe format: A standard CD (as above) and a bonus CD. Bonus CD includes B-sides, live tracks and rarities. Also includes a 32-page booklet with previously unseen photos, full lyrics, new liner notes by Niall Stokes, and explanatory notes on the bonus material by the Edge.
3. Vinyl format: A single remastered album version on 180-gram vinyl with restored packaging.

=== Bonus CD ===
All tracks are written by U2.

No.	Title	Original release	Length
1.	"Endless Deep" (Wordless vocal provided by Adam Clayton)	"Sunday Bloody Sunday" and "Two Hearts Beat as One" singles	2:58
2.	"Angels Too Tied to the Ground"	Previously unreleased outtake from "War" sessions	3:34
3.	"New Year's Day" (7" single edit)	"New Year's Day" single	3:56
4.	"New Year's Day" (USA remix)	"Two Hearts Beat as One" single	4:31
5.	"New Year's Day" (Ferry Corsten extended vocal mix)	Previously unreleased	9:42
6.	"New Year's Day" (Ferry Corsten vocal radio mix)	Previously unreleased	4:37
7.	"Two Hearts Beat as One" (Long mix)	"Two Hearts Beat as One" promotional single	5:56
8.	"Two Hearts Beat as One" (USA remix)	"Two Hearts Beat as One" single	4:24
9.	"Two Hearts Beat as One" (Club version)	"Two Hearts Beat as One" single	5:43
10.	"Treasure (Whatever Happened to Pete the Chop)"	"New Year's Day" single	3:24
11.	"I Threw a Brick Through a Window / A Day Without Me" (Live from Werchter, 4 July 1982)	"New Year's Day" single	6:58
12.	"Fire" (Live from Werchter, 4 July 1982)	"New Year's Day" single	3:46
Total length:			59:28

== Personnel ==
U2

- Bono – lead vocals, guitar
- The Edge – guitar, piano, lap steel, backing vocals, co-lead vocals on "Seconds", bass on "40"
- Adam Clayton – bass (except "40")
- Larry Mullen Jr. – drums, percussion

Additional personnel

- Steve Wickham – electric violin on "Sunday Bloody Sunday" and "Drowning Man"
- Kenny Fradley – trumpet on "Red Light"
- The Coconuts: Cheryl Poirier, Adriana Kaegi, Taryn Hagey, Jessica Felton – backing vocals on "Red Light" and "Surrender"

Technical personnel

- Steve Lillywhite – production (except "The Refugee"), mixing
- Bill Whelan – production on "The Refugee"
- Paul Thomas – engineering
- Kevin Killen – engineering assistance
- Gordon Vicary – mastering
- Ian Finlay – photography ("Boy Photograph")
- Anton Corbijn – photography ("Band Photograph")

== Charts ==
Weekly album charts

Chart (1983)	Peak position
Australia (Kent Music Report)	9
Belgian Albums (Ultratop Flanders)	51
Belgian Albums (Ultratop Wallonia)	41
Canada Top Albums/CDs (RPM)	4
Dutch Albums (Album Top 100)	3
French Albums (SNEP)	30
German Albums (Offizielle Top 100)	59
Irish Albums (IRMA)	16
Italian Albums (FIMI)	31
New Zealand Albums (RMNZ)	5
Norwegian Albums (VG-lista)	15
Portuguese Albums (AFP)	26
Spanish Albums (Promusicae)	38
Swedish Albums (Sverigetopplistan)	2
UK Albums (OCC)	1
US Billboard 200	12

Chart (2025–2026)	Peak position
Greek Albums (IFPI)	51

Weekly song charts

Song	Peak (1983)					
Song	IRE	CAN	NL	UK	US Hot 100	US Main Rock
"New Year's Day"	2	41	4	10	53	2
"Sunday Bloody Sunday"	—	—	3	—	—	7
"Two Hearts Beat As One"	2	—	—	18	—	12
"Surrender"	—	—	—	—	—	27
"—" denotes a release that did not chart.

== Certifications ==
Region	Certification	Certified units/sales
Australia (ARIA)	2× Platinum	140,000^{^}
Belgium (BRMA)	Platinum	50,000^{*}
Brazil (Pro-Música Brasil)	Gold	100,000^{*}
Canada (Music Canada)	3× Platinum	300,000^{^}
France (SNEP)	2× Platinum	600,000^{*}
Germany (BVMI)	Gold	250,000^{^}
Italy	—	400,000
Netherlands (NVPI)	Gold	50,000^{^}
New Zealand (RMNZ)	Platinum	15,000^{^}
Spain (Promusicae)	Gold	50,000^{^}
Switzerland (IFPI Switzerland)	Gold	25,000^{^}
United Kingdom (BPI)	2× Platinum	600,000^{^}
United States (RIAA)	4× Platinum	4,000,000^{^}
Summaries
Worldwide	—	11,000,000
^{*} Sales figures based on certification alone.^{^} Shipments figures based on certification alone.

== See also ==
- List of covers of U2 songs – Drowning Man
- List of covers of U2 songs – Like a Song...
- U2 discography
