= The Refugees =

The Refugees may refer to:

- The Refugees (novel), an 1893 novel by British writer Sir Arthur Conan Doyle
- The Refugees (TV series), a 2015 drama about time travellers
- The Refugees (band), an American folk trio
- The Refugees (short story collection), a 2017 short story collection by Viet Thanh Nguyen

== See also ==
- Refugee (disambiguation)
