= Seconds (song) =

Song by U2

from the album War
- Released: 28 February 1983
- Recorded: September–November 1982
- Studio: Windmill Lane Studios (Dublin)
- Genre: Rock, post-punk
- Length: 3:10
- Label: Island
- Songwriter: U2
- Producer: Steve Lillywhite

"Seconds" is the second track on U2's 1983 album, War. The track, with its recurring lyric of "it takes a second to say goodbye", refers to nuclear proliferation. It is the first song in the band's history not sung solely by Bono, as the Edge sings the first two stanzas.

There is a break of approximately 11 seconds in the song at 2:10 featuring a sample of a 1981 documentary film titled Soldier Girls. Bono said that he was watching this documentary while he was waiting in the green room in Windmill Lane Studios and he recorded it. The band felt it would fit well into the song as unsettling evidence of soldiers training for an atomic bomb explosion.

== Writing and inspiration ==
"'Seconds' is particularly pertinent today because it's about the idea that at some point someone, somewhere, would get their hands on nuclear material and build a suitcase bomb in an apartment in western capital. It was twenty years early but I wouldn't call it prophetic, I'd just call it obvious."

— Bono, on the meaning of the song

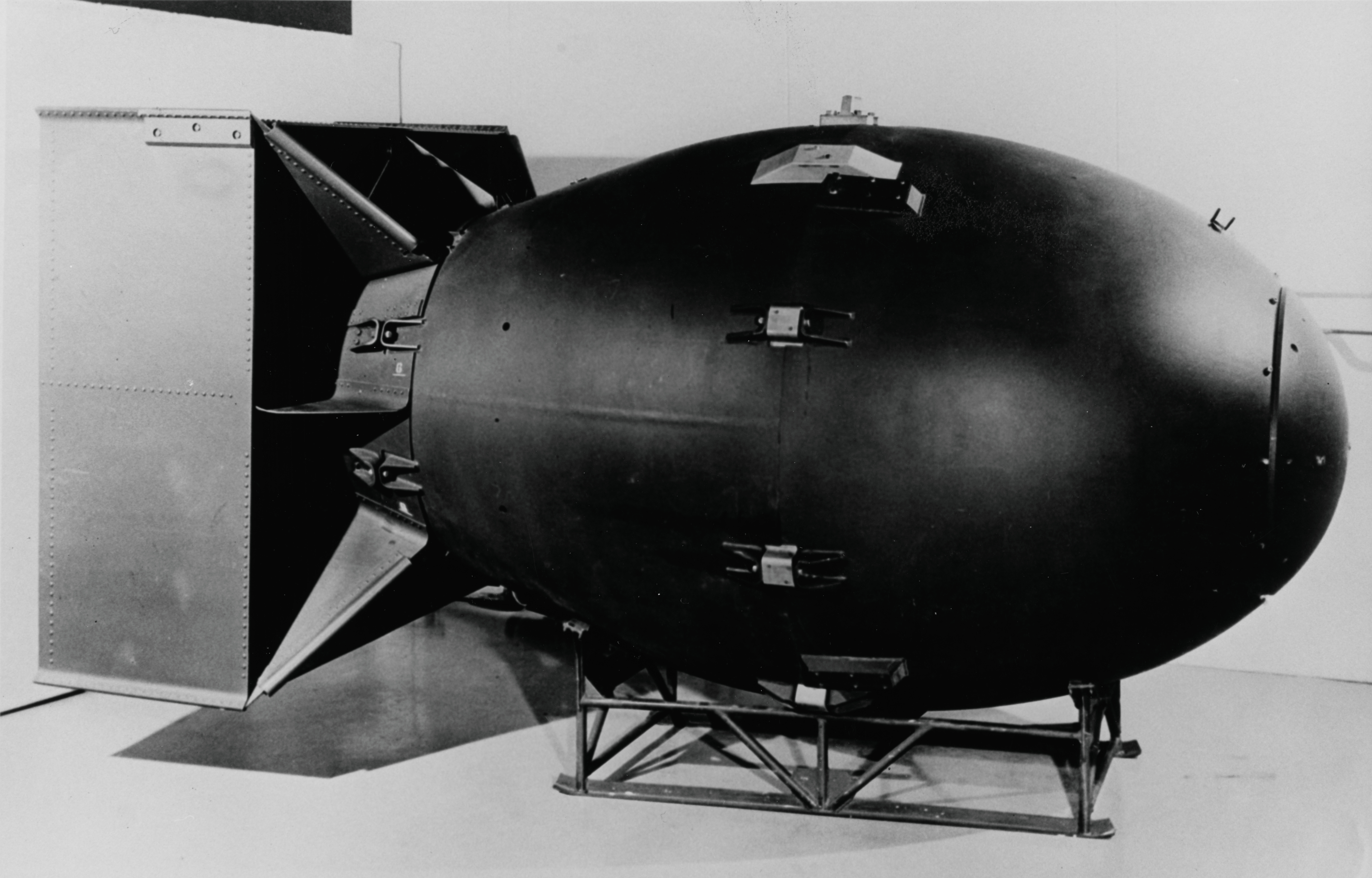
Some of the lyrics refer to nuclear proliferation

During his writer's block period in 1982, Bono felt it was lonely writing lyrics, so he asked the Edge to assist in writing, but the guitarist wasn't interested in such a goal. The Edge finally wrote the line "It takes a second to say goodbye". Bono wrote the remainder of the lyrics. On the recording, the Edge sings the first verse of the song. Lyrics in the song about dancing to the atomic bomb is a reference to "Drop the Bomb," a song by Go-go group Trouble Funk, who were U2's labelmates on Island Records.

== Reception ==
In a Rolling Stone review of the album itself, editor J.D. Considine wrote, "'Seconds,' ... opens with a sleepy funk riff driven by a cheerful toy bass drum. It's a pleasant juxtaposition, but as the song's subject matter becomes clear – the insanity of nuclear blackmail, where, as Bono Vox puts it, 'the puppets pull the strings'—you realize that this jolly noisemaker is no more an innocent plaything than is the one in Günter Grass' The Tin Drum."

In 2008, for a review of new reissues of the band's first three albums, Pitchfork editor Joe Tangari wrote "'Seconds' rides a hypnotic bass line to a final verse that conflates nuclear standoff with a dance craze".

== Live performances ==
"Seconds" accordingly became the first song to feature the Edge on lead vocals live when it debuted at the first concert of the War Tour on 26 February 1983. It was a regular inclusion in the first half of the band's main sets for the War Tour during 1983 and during the Unforgettable Fire Tour during 1984 and 1985. A live performance of the song at Red Rocks Amphitheatre is featured on the concert film U2 Live at Red Rocks: Under a Blood Red Sky, recorded on 5 June 1983. On 3 November 2023, they played the song again during a concert during their U2:UV Ultraviolet Achtung Baby Live at Sphere residency, marking the first performance of the song since 7 July 1985.

== Other versions ==
- Mundy contributed a cover version to Even Better Than the Real Thing Vol. 3, a charity album composed entirely of U2 songs and released in 2005.
- Rogue Wave released an iTunes Store-exclusive cover of this song in 2005.
- Sierra Leone's Refugee All Stars released a cover of the song in 2007, featuring Aerosmith's guitarist Joe Perry.
