= Gavin Taylor =

British film and television director

- Born: 1942
- Died: 12 June 2013 (aged 70–71); St Oswald’s Hospice, Gosforth, Newcastle, England
- Occupation: film and television director

Gavin Taylor (c. 1942 – 12 June 2013) was a British film and television director. He was known for directing the broadcasts of major concerts and other televised events. Taylor's credits included The Tube television series, U2 Live at Red Rocks: Under a Blood Red Sky in 1983, and Queen at Wembley in 1986.

Taylor lived at Darras Hall in Northumberland. He had two children and three grandchildren.

Taylor worked for Tyne Tees Television (now called ITV Tyne Tees) from 1960 until 1996. He left Tyne Tees in 1996 in order to film The Royal Concert, a performance by Michael Jackson for the Royal Family of Brunei held in July 1996 in Bandar Seri Begawan. He had been offered the Jackson concert job by contacts he had made while directing The Tube during the 1980s.

Taylor died from a short illness at St Oswald's Hospice in Gosforth, Newcastle, on 12 June 2013, at the age of 71.
