= Refugium =

Refugium, plural refugia, the Latin for "refuge" or "hideaway", may refer to:

- Refugium (fishkeeping), an appendage to a marine, brackish, or freshwater fish tank that shares the same water supply
- Refugium (population biology), a location of an isolated or relict population of a once widespread animal or plant species
  - Last Glacial Maximum refugia specifically, in anthropology
- Refugium Range, a mountain range on Vancouver Island, British Columbia, Canada

== See also ==
- Refuge (Buddhism)
- Refugium Peccatorum
