= Fire (U2 song) =

- UK/Irish cover

Single by U2

from the album October
- B-side: "J. Swallo"
- Released: 27 July 1981
- Recorded: April 1981
- Studio: Compass Point (Nassau, Bahamas)
- Genre: Rock; post-punk
- Length: 3:48
- Label: CBS Ireland; Island
- Songwriter: U2
- Producer: Steve Lillywhite

U2 singles chronology
"I Will Follow" (1980)	"Fire" (1981)	"Gloria" (1981)

"Fire" is a song by Irish rock band U2. It is the fifth track on the band's 1981 album, October, and it was released in July 1981 as the album's first single.

== History ==
The October album version of "Fire" was recorded at Compass Point Studios in the Bahamas while U2 took a break from the Boy Tour in April 1981. After its initial release, "Fire" was U2's first song to chart in the UK, where it managed to break the top 40, peaking at No. 35.

Some vinyl and cassette versions of U2's debut album Boy included a 30-second instrumental hidden track after the album's closer, "Shadows and Tall Trees". This track featured the same guitar riff as the one from "Fire". It was not until the release of the 2008 Deluxe Edition of Boy and its bonus CD that this track was shown to be "Saturday Night", a previously unreleased song that featured the same guitar riff from "Fire" and almost the same instrumentation, but with different lyrics. "Saturday Night" was eventually rewritten into what became "Fire".

== Live performances ==
"Fire" was played in concert for the first time on 27 May 1981, a month after the album version was recorded. It was the second of two songs from the October album played on the Boy Tour with the first being "I Fall Down". "Fire" was a set list regular for much of the October Tour, although it was not played at any of the tour's shows where U2 acted as support for the J. Geils Band. It then appeared on the War Tour's "Pre-Tour", and its last live performance was at the first proper date of the War Tour on 26 February 1983. Most of its live appearances were in the encore, often as the first encore song. "Fire" was also the song U2 played for their first appearance on Top of the Pops.

== Releases ==
The July 1981 single release came in three versions – a two-track 7-inch vinyl, a double 7-inch vinyl pack, and a 12-inch vinyl single titled "U2 R.O.K.", a pun on the word "rock" and on the phrase "U2 are OK". A fourth version was released ten years later on CD in 1991, also under the title "U2 R.O.K."

The song was later included as a B-side on the Japanese version of the "A Celebration" single in 1982, and as a live version on several versions of the "New Year's Day" single in 1983.

The single was not released in North America.

"Fire" was reissued on Record Store Day in 2021 to commemorate the 40th anniversary of its original release. It was pressed on vinyl picture disc, with "Fire" and "J. Swallo" on the A-side and two live versions of "Fire" on the B-side.

== Formats and track listings ==
7": Island / WIP6679 United Kingdom
No.	Title	Length
1.	"Fire"	3:48
2.	"J. Swallo"	2:18

2x7": Island / UWIP6679 United Kingdom
No.	Title	Length
1.	"Fire"	3:48
2.	"J. Swallo"	2:18
3.	"11 O'Clock Tick Tock/The Ocean" (Live at Paradise Rock Club, Boston, Massachusetts, 6 March 1981)	7:03
4.	"Cry/The Electric Co." (Live at Paradise Rock Club, Boston, Massachusetts, 6 March 1981)	4:53

12": Island / 600.417 Germany (U2 R.O.K.)
No.	Title	Length
1.	"Fire"	3:50
2.	"J. Swallo" (Listed as "Johnny Swallow" on record)	2:20
3.	"11 O'Clock Tick Tock" (Live at Paradise Rock Club, Boston, Massachusetts, 6 March 1981)	4:52
4.	"The Ocean" (Live at Paradise Rock Club, Boston, Massachusetts, 6 March 1981)	2:14

1991 CD: Island / 664 972 Germany (U2 R.O.K.)
No.	Title	Length
1.	"Fire"	3:48
2.	"J. Swallo"	2:18
3.	"11 O'Clock Tick Tock" (Live at Paradise Rock Club, Boston, Massachusetts, 6 March 1981)	4:52
4.	"The Ocean" (Live at Paradise Rock Club, Boston, Massachusetts, 6 March 1981)	2:14

== Charts ==
Chart (1981)	Peak position
Irish Singles Chart	4
UK Singles Chart	35
