= U2 Live at Red Rocks: Under a Blood Red Sky =

1984 concert film by U2

- Original videocassette release cover

Video by U2
- Released: 1984
- Recorded: 5 June 1983
- Venue: Red Rocks Amphitheatre (Morrison, Colorado)
- Genre: Post-punk
- Length: 55 minutes (1984 release); 82 minutes (2008 release)
- Label: Island
- Director: Gavin Taylor
- Producers: Rick Wurpel; Doug Stewart

U2 chronology
Under a Blood Red Sky (1983)	U2 Live at Red Rocks: Under a Blood Red Sky (1984)	The Unforgettable Fire (1984)

U2 Live at Red Rocks: Under a Blood Red Sky is a concert film by Irish rock band U2. It was recorded on 5 June 1983 at Red Rocks Amphitheatre in Colorado, United States, on the group's War Tour. Originally released in 1984 on videocassette, U2 Live at Red Rocks was the band's first video release. It accompanied a 1983 live album entitled Under a Blood Red Sky, on which two tracks from the film appear. The video was directed by Gavin Taylor and produced by Rick Wurpel and Doug Stewart.

The film was arranged by U2 management to showcase the band's live act and to promote them to American audiences. It depicts the band's performance at Red Rocks on a rain-soaked evening. The concert was almost cancelled because of the inclement weather, but the band had invested in the filming with Island Records and concert promoter Barry Fey and wished to proceed with the gig. The rain and the torch-lit atmosphere of the surroundings made U2's performance dramatic. Segments of U2 Live at Red Rocks were shown in regular rotation on MTV, and were also broadcast on other television networks.

Critics praised the concert and the video, and it subsequently became a best-seller. The video, along with Under a Blood Red Sky, helped establish U2's reputation as remarkable live performers and boosted Red Rocks' stature as a live venue. A remastered edition of U2 Live at Red Rocks was released on DVD in September 2008 with previously unreleased tracks, coinciding with a remastered edition of Under a Blood Red Sky. Rolling Stone selected the film's performance of "Sunday Bloody Sunday" as one of the "50 Moments that Changed the History of Rock and Roll".

== Production ==
=== Planning and organization ===
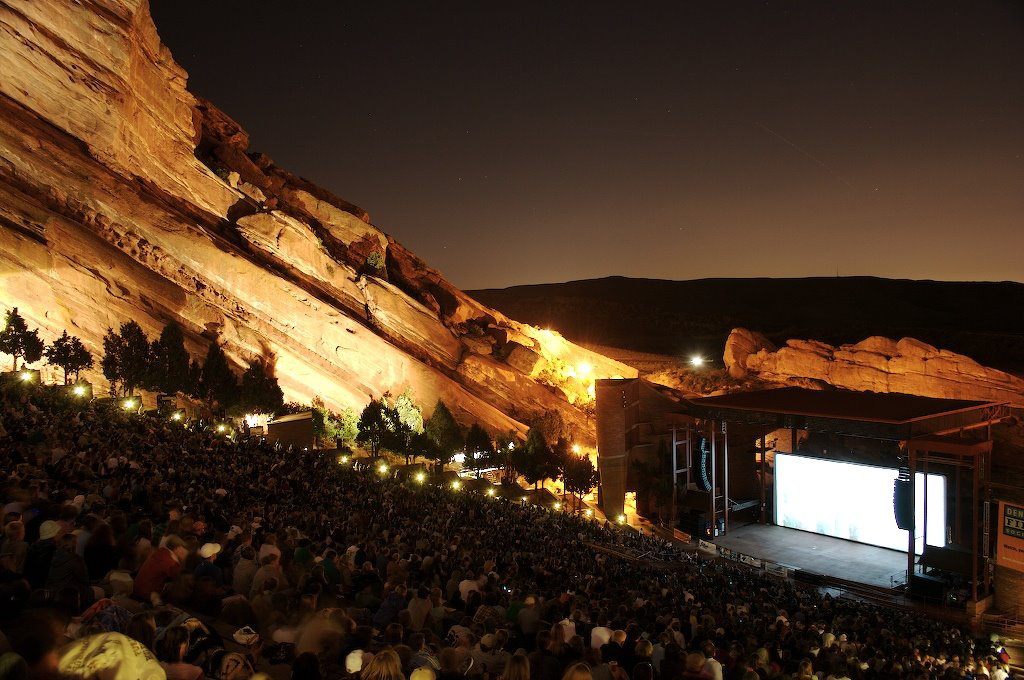
Red Rocks Amphitheatre, the site of the concert, pictured in 2006.

In 1981, U2 were on their Boy Tour to promote their debut album, Boy. Following their 11 May concert at Rainbow Music Hall in Denver, concert promoter Chuck Morris took the band to the nearby Red Rocks Amphitheatre—a natural amphitheatre located between sandstone cliffs in the Rocky Mountains. Bassist Adam Clayton said, "From the moment we saw it, we were thinking, 'Some day we will play here'. It was very photogenic." U2's manager Paul McGuinness had long wanted to film the group for a concert video to highlight their success as a live act and to promote them to American audiences still unfamiliar with the Irish band. Concert promoter Barry Fey, who presented U2's shows in the southwestern United States, saw the group's potential and successfully lobbied for them to perform at Red Rocks.

In early 1983, McGuinness contacted Malcolm Gerrie, producer of the British television series The Tube, about shooting a video of U2 at Red Rocks and possibly featuring it on The Tube. Gerrie initially assumed McGuinness was interested in creating a video of a single song; however, McGuinness was hoping to create an hour-long special. Because The Tube was not a "one-band show", Gerrie said he would have to sell the idea to Channel 4 television, but McGuinness insisted on giving Gerrie the rights to the video and letting Channel 4 broadcast the video without payment.

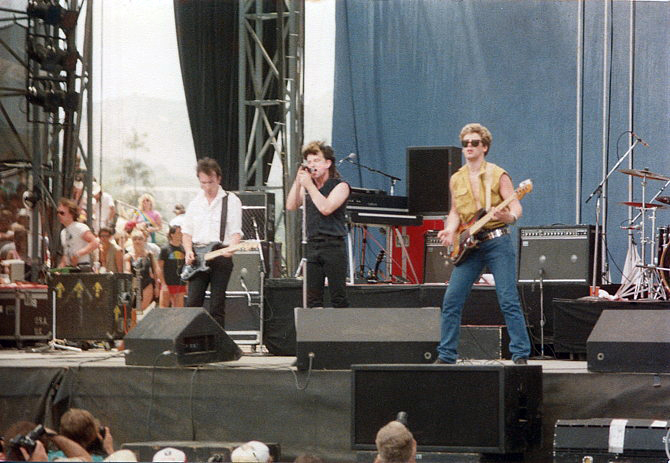
U2 performing at the US Festival in May 1983, six days before the Red Rocks show.

Filming costs were estimated at US$250,000, which included the illumination of the cliffs, a mobile sound recording unit, and a helicopter to film aerial footage. With U2 only able to invest $30,000, Fey agreed to help finance the project, along with Island Records. A joint production company called "U2 at Red Rocks Associates" was subsequently established to fund the filming; the three parties split costs and shared profits from television rights and video sales. The radio rights were sold to American radio network NBC for inclusion in its concert series The Source. Throughout the United States leg of their War Tour, U2 filled venues with capacities similar to that of Red Rocks, leading the band to anticipate that the filming would take place before a sold-out audience and that the concert's revenues would help to offset production costs.

Fey's corporation, Feyline Productions, coordinated with his production company, TTS, to manage the videotaping. Director Gavin Taylor and Gerrie were selected as director and production associate, respectively. It was Taylor's first visit to the United States, and it was the first time he filmed a major outdoor rock concert. Local producers Rick Wurpel and Doug Stewart were also on the staff. Taylor's and McGuinness' original plans were to feature the video on The Tube, but trade unions objected to their limited representation on the concert crew. However, a compromise was reached, allowing 15 minutes of the concert to be broadcast on The Tube.

=== Weather challenges and preparations ===
"There was a lot of money riding on this; everything that was in the bank, basically. We were well organised, camera crews all over the gig. We brought extra lighting, searchlights, all kinds of stuff. And then it started to rain. Those were nail-biting times. Many of the crew were advising us to pull out, but in true U2 style, we carried on regardless."

— Larry Mullen Jr.

The group's Red Rocks concert was scheduled for 5 June 1983, but poor weather that day threatened to cancel the show. Torrential rain soaked the area, and flash flood warnings were issued. The weather made it difficult for the crew members to transport the band's gear and video equipment through the mountains to the amphitheatre. The conditions also caused many technical problems for the filming and concert crews, hampering stage construction and endangering the safety of those setting up lighting and sound equipment. Crew members used squeegees to keep rain away from the wires, although the assistant of recording engineer Randy Ezratty still received an electrical shock while setting up a lighting truss. Between 15 and 20 fans were already camped out in the venue's front rows early in the morning, and lead singer Bono accommodated them by serving coffee and tea. The Alarm and Divinyls cancelled their opening sets for safety reasons, and many fans thought the entire concert had been cancelled. The show was scheduled for 6:00 p.m., and the band had until 1:00 p.m. to decide whether to move the concert elsewhere or risk the weather worsening, which could have necessitated a cancellation.

U2 and McGuinness thought that too much money had been invested to abort the concert, and they sympathised with the fans who had travelled to the venue in the poor weather. Accordingly, they decided to proceed with the concert as planned. Many of the crew were not in agreement and wanted to walk off the set. Ezratty said: "The guys from the American sound company were not at all enamored with being out with this band. I can remember them saying, 'Oh, we could be out with Asia right now!' So they decided to pull the plug on it. They said, 'It's a matter of safety. We're going to pull the system down and we're not going to do it.'" McGuinness dissuaded the crew with an impromptu speech, a moment on which Ezratty recollected: "Paul called everybody down into the bowels of Red Rocks where they fed everybody. It was cold and raining and everybody was shivering, and Paul made a speech, saying in no uncertain terms that we were going to proceed as one, that the band's entire livelihood was riding on this, and that this was one of the most pivotal moments in their career. He said that if it were deemed that this show was in any way possible to happen, it was going to happen, and it was not going to be tolerated that anybody would do anything but add their effort to a successful and positive outcome. I just stood there and went, 'This is so cool. This is like a general rallying the troops.'"

Bono informed the fans waiting outside the venue that the show would be general admission, and told everyone to get as close to the stage as possible, regardless of the seating assignment on their tickets. Fey wanted to cancel the show but was flying to Denver from the US Festival in California with Morris when the decision to continue was made. After arriving in Denver, Fey called the amphitheatre asking to where the concert was being moved, unaware that the band had decided to proceed with the show. Guitarist the Edge said that when Fey learned of the group's decision, he could not believe it. The Edge said, "I don't think he'd ever heard anything quite so crazy in his life, going on with an outdoor show in the worst kind of weather, rain and wind in the mountains. He thought we'd lost our minds completely." Bono went on the radio that day to confirm that the Red Rocks concert was still taking place, and to promote a concert that the band planned for the following night at the CU Events Center to accommodate fans who were unable to attend the Red Rocks show. Clayton said during the band's radio interviews, "We know it's raining now but we're sure it won't be when the show starts, so please come." Two hours before the concert, the downpour subsided and settled into a misty drizzle. The 9,000-person venue had sold out, but because of the inclement weather, only about 4,400 fans attended.

=== Filming and post-production ===
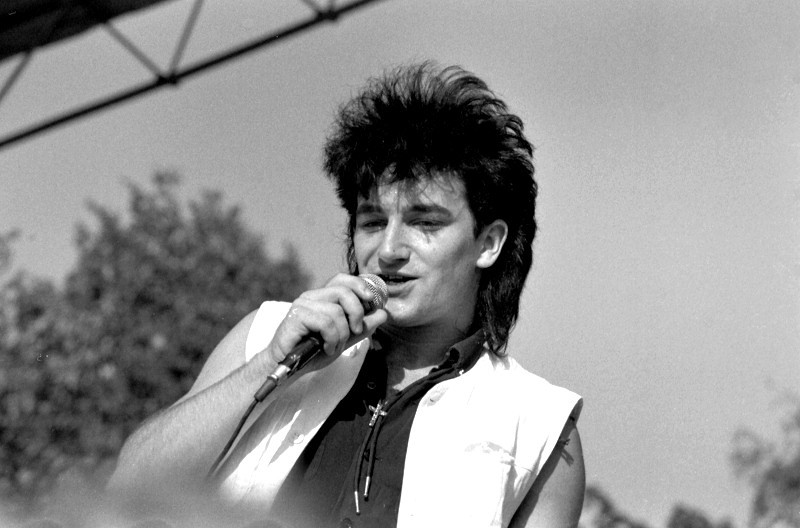
Bono, pictured in August 1983, used a thrust built at the edge of the Red Rocks stage to perform closer to the audience.

Taylor had a crew of six camera operators, comprising three Denver cinematographers and three others that he brought. Due to the thick fog and heavy rain on the night of the concert, very little aerial footage was suitable for the final edit. Although two "master angle" cameras on tripods provided wide and overview shots, most of the camera operators filmed with hand-held cameras. Much of the concert footage contains red streaks, which was caused by the cameras' tube sensors when they were pointed directly at light sources. This prompted a notice on the future home video release informing viewers that the coloured lines in the footage "are a result of special lighting effects, and are not caused by a tape defect or your equipment". The weather was cold enough that steam was coming out of the band members' mouths, and the Edge had difficulty playing guitar because his hands felt "frozen stiff". Drummer Larry Mullen Jr. believes the weather contributed a dramatic atmosphere to the concert. Reduced attendance at the event was largely obscured in the concert footage by the thick mist that filled the air that evening, as well as strategic shots of the crowd. Having seen Bono's interactions with an audience at a show in Gateshead years earlier, Taylor decided to have a thrust built at the front of the Red Rocks stage to reduce the gap between the audience and Bono, and to allow him to be surrounded by fans on three sides. Sound mixing was managed by Steve Lillywhite, who produced U2's first three studio albums. Ezratty's recording company, Effanel Music, was hired to provide their portable multitrack recording system.

Before U2 took the stage, Fey introduced the concert, making a reference to Bob Dylan's live album Hard Rain. The concert itself featured 18 songs, with a set list identical to that of several previous shows on the tour. "Out of Control" opened the 14-song main set, which concluded with "Gloria". A four-song encore followed, with "40" being the final song performed. The band played songs from the tour's supporting album War (1983), as well as material from their first two albums, Boy (1980) and October (1981). "Party Girl"—a B-side from the single "A Celebration" (1982), and the non-album single "11 O'Clock Tick Tock" (1980) were played during the encore.

During the song "The Electric Co.", Bono left the stage and climbed up a lighting rig to display a white flag. In a 2004 interview, the Edge said that Bono "scared the shit out of [him]" by climbing onto the rig and risking electrocution by the live wires in close proximity. Bono said "good night" to the crowd on nearly a half a dozen occasions so that the post-production crew would have several choices of songs with which to end the film. Backstage, the band members were disappointed that the crowd did not initially chant "how long to sing this song?" after the band had left the stage following the final song, "40", which had become a tradition. However, tour manager Dennis Sheehan hid underneath the crowd barrier and began singing the refrain into a microphone without being asked. Eventually, the crowd joined in; the film was edited to disguise the fact that the singing was organised.

The day after the concert, Taylor went into the video editing suite to prepare a promotional video and a rough edit of the concert, while Lillywhite mixed the sound at Caribou Ranch. Ultimately, Taylor completed two separate edits of the concert: the first was an hour-long version for a planned but cancelled UK television broadcast that was instead released on VHS; the second version was the full concert.

== Release ==
=== Broadcasts and initial home video ===
The concert was first broadcast on 8, 9 and 10 July 1983 on NBC's radio network The Source under the title War Is Declared. The broadcast was sponsored by Budweiser and the United States Army, and was distributed to radio stations on two LP records, which included the full concert minus "I Threw A Brick Through A Window" and "A Day Without Me". Twelve of the concert's songs were later broadcast on American television network Showtime, and nine songs were broadcast on MTV. The film's performance of "Sunday Bloody Sunday" became the song's music video; Malcolm Gerrie, Rick Wurpel and Paul McGuinness were credited as producers. In June 1986, the video was one of 10 concert films aired on television stations throughout the US as part of a series of music specials presented by the Coors Brewing Company and Radio Vision International. The concert has also been broadcast on VH1 and affiliates of the Public Broadcasting Service.

The Red Rocks film was screened at the CMJ Music Marathon in October 1983 to promote U2's companion live mini-LP Under a Blood Red Sky, which was released the following month. The mini-LP, whose name was later used as a subtitle for the concert film, features eight live songs from the War Tour, two of which ("Gloria" and "Party Girl") were taken from the Red Rocks concert; the other tracks were taken from performances in Boston and West Germany, as U2 thought they were "more developed performances".

U2 Live at Red Rocks: Under a Blood Red Sky was U2's first home video release, and it was initially issued on VHS and Betamax by MCA Home Video in July 1984, followed by a LaserDisc release from Pony Video for Japan. The video recording was re-released in August 1986 by RCA/Columbia Pictures Home Video, followed by a LaserDisc release from RCA/Columbia and Image Entertainment in 1988, and two additional VHS re-releases by Virgin Video in 1987 and PolyGram in 1991.

The image of Bono atop the lighting rig during his performance of "The Electric Co." was used as the cover of the video with the text Under a Blood Red Sky. The film begins with a brief montage that includes an interview with U2, preparations being made by the concert crew and reactions by anxious fans. The Clannad song "Theme from Harry's Game", which was played after many of U2's shows at the time, is heard in the film's opening montage and during the end credits. The film's subtitle "Under a Blood Red Sky", also the title of the companion live album, originates from a lyric in "New Year's Day". This lyric is not sung in the film; instead Bono sang "under a thundercloud and rain", in reference to the weather conditions.

During the band's performance of "Cry / The Electric Co.", Bono sang excerpts of Stephen Sondheim's "Send in the Clowns". The band failed to get permission or to pay the appropriate licensing and royalty fees to use the song. Initial pressings of U2 Live at Red Rocks, and the accompanying live album—which contains a different performance of the song from August 1983—featured "Send in the Clowns". U2 were forced to pay US$50,000 in an out-of-court settlement. The initial release of the video was 55 minutes long and featured 13 songs from the film, including "Cry / The Electric Co.", which was omitted from the track listing for legal reasons related to the excerpt of "Send in the Clowns".

Recordings of "Twilight" and "An Cat Dubh" from the concert were featured on U2's single "Sweetest Thing" in 1998. In 2004, the concert recording of "Sunday Bloody Sunday" appeared on the compilation album Carved in Stone Vol. 2: Live at Red Rocks, a charity record to raise funds for the "Preserve the Rocks Fund", which aimed to renovate and preserve Red Rocks Park.

Following the release of the official concert recordings, video and audio bootleg recordings circulated that featured the entirety of the band's performance.

=== DVD re-release and streaming ===
In 2005, after Rick Wurpel re-opened his production business, he realised that neither he nor TTS had the master tapes in their inventory and feared that they had been lost. He discovered the Denver City Council possessed the tapes among an inventory of 164 recordings. A former employee of Wurpel had been storing the tapes and intended to dispose of them unless the city was interested. The city had paid her $3,000 for the storage costs and took possession of the tapes. Legal proceedings subsequently ensued to return the tapes to Wurpel and U2.

Barry Fey later signed paperwork for a future DVD release at U2's request. U2 Live at Red Rocks was re-released on 30 September 2008 on DVD by Interscope Records, Island Records, and Universal Music Enterprises. The "2008 Edition" of the film was remastered, and the audio remastering was directed by the Edge. The DVD features several tracks that were previously unreleased, extending the film from 55 to 82 minutes. "Cry / The Electric Co." was included on the video's track listing; the performance was edited to remove the excerpt of "Send in the Clowns" that was present on the previous videocassette and LaserDisc releases. The editing-out of the song created a continuity error in the video; the previous versions showed Bono climbing the lighting rig and singing. The new edition removes that sequence, resulting in Bono leaving the stage and appearing on top of the lighting rig in the following shot.

The remastered DVD also features a version of "Two Hearts Beat as One" that was edited to remove an excerpt of "Let's Twist Again". The only song performed at the concert that does not appear in the remastered film is "I Fall Down"—played between "Cry / The Electric Co." and "October"—which was omitted because of a camera malfunction. The DVD features a PCM stereo soundtrack, 5.1 surround sound mixes in Dolby Digital and DTS sound, and an audio commentary by director Gavin Taylor. The re-release of the film coincided with the release of a remastered version of its companion live album, Under a Blood Red Sky. These re-releases were available separately or bundled together in a CD/DVD deluxe package. The liner notes for the film re-release were written by music critic Anthony DeCurtis. Remastered versions of U2's first three albums—Boy, October, and War—had been released earlier in 2008, and a box set with the three albums and an open slot for the deluxe version of Under a Blood Red Sky was sold exclusively by Amazon.com.

On 15 March 2021, U2 announced a concert broadcast series called "The Virtual Road" in partnership with YouTube, by which four of the group's past concert films were remastered and streamed on the band's official YouTube channel for 48 hours each. Live at Red Rocks began streaming on 25 March, with a pre-recorded performance by Irish rock band Fontaines D.C. serving as an "opening act". To coincide with the broadcast event, a four-track EP of songs from Live at Red Rocks was released to streaming services and digital stores.

== Reception ==
=== Critical reaction ===
Professional ratings
Review scores
Source	Rating
The Advertiser (2008)	2.5/5 stars
Allmovie	4.5/5 stars
The Irish Times (2008)	4/5 stars
The New York Times	favourable
PopMatters (2008)	8/10
Record Collector (2008)	4/5 stars
Rocky Mountain News (2008)	A+
Rolling Stone (2008)	5/5 stars
The Sunday Telegraph / Sunday Herald Sun (2008)	5/5 stars
Video Librarian (2008)	3.5/4 stars

Both the concert and the U2 Live at Red Rocks video received positive reviews from critics. In a review of the show, G. Brown of The Denver Post wrote, "A lot of things had to go so wrong for U2's show at Red Rocks Amphitheater ... to come off so right." Jon Pareles of The New York Times praised the film, saying, "The setting lent even more urgency to U2's hypercharged songs about apocalypse, pacifism and existential terror". Pareles said, "Although there are a few too many exaggerated camera angles, the tape captures U2's earnest intensity." A review in the Philadelphia Daily News described the camerawork as "artful" and praised the visuals of the concert and the natural surroundings. Louis Meredith of Stereo Review said that the video captured the group in "absolutely splendid form" and that "Musically, it's about as impressive as they come" with "inventive and passionately felt" instrumental performances. He said that Bono "accomplishes the nearly impossible—turning a typical Nuremberg Rally-scaled outdoor concert into something that seems almost intimate." Meredith criticised the cinematography as "unimaginative, made-for-MTV camera work" and judged that the soundtrack was not as good as the EP. Neal Hall of The Sun said the band "prove[d] why it was named by Record magazine as the top live act of 1983" and that they performed with a "vigor and vitality that is entrancing to witness, even on a small screen". He found the sound "surprisingly clean and crisp" but noted the red trails were a visual problem. Perry Seibert of Allmovie gave the film four-and-a-half stars, praising the band's performance and the venue's role in the concert, saying, "the historic Red Rocks venue provides a stirring backdrop for the band's sweeping sound".

Following the release of the DVD in 2008, Record Collector stated that "25 years on, [U2 Live at Red Rocks has] lost none of its power". Brian Boyd of The Irish Times was impressed by the band's performance considering they were drawing from just three albums of material and lacked the "computerised wizardry that makes U2 shows now such extravaganzas", adding, "what most impresses here is how full-on the concert is as the band give it socks during a rain-lashed evening". Bernard Zuel of The Sydney Morning Herald called the concert one of the moments in U2's history that showed their "ability to connect with and move an audience at a time when artifice and pomposity were rampant". He was fascinated that the "rain and fog that marks the Red Rocks show, and made the mythology even more potent, almost led to its cancellation". Mark Brown of the Rocky Mountain News recalled that the video is "still a thrilling performance, raw but polished, passionate and sincere". Andrew Gilstrap of PopMatters gave the remastered version of the film a rating of 8 out of 10, stating, "It's rare that a band can totally transform a scene—especially one with a stage show that boasts charisma as its only special effect—but it's not hyperbole to say that U2 put on a dominating, flawless-despite-mistakes performance. This is the one that put U2 on the map." In its review of the remastered version of Under a Blood Red Sky, online magazine Pitchfork said, "when the group performed at Red Rocks on a rainy June night, with lit torches above a panoramic skyline, the venue provided an ideal backdrop for U2's literally flag-waving music, with everything—earth, wind, fire—in place to maximise and heighten the drama of the moment and the songs." Christina Sursky of the McClatchy-Tribune News Service said, "The DVD glows with the energy of U2's performances", and she called the rendition of "Sunday Bloody Sunday" the film's highlight. Randy Pitman of Video Librarian called the performance a "blistering 17-song set full of early material now rarely played aside from the hits 'Sunday Bloody Sunday' and 'New Year's Day'". He added that although casual fans may only recognise the aforementioned hits, "the faithful will be thrilled with this classic concert". James Wigney of The Sunday Telegraph and the Sunday Herald Sun gave the DVD a score of 5 out of 5, praising the film's concert, but stated that the "footage is still on the fuzzy side". Sam Kelton of The Advertiser said the DVD's audio commentary was very informative, but criticised the picture quality, stating, "even the remastered version looks like it was shot on a mobile phone".

=== Commercial performance ===
In November 1984, the video was nominated for the Best Long Form award at Billboard magazine's Video Music Conference and the performance of "Sunday Bloody Sunday" was nominated for the Best Concert Performance award. When Billboard debuted the Top Music Videocassettes chart (later renamed Top Music Videos) in the 30 March 1985 issue, U2 Live at Red Rocks ranked at number seven. The video was included in the year-end Top Music Videocassettes charts for 1985 and 1987. Following the 2008 DVD release, the video re-entered the chart for the first time since 1989, reaching number 3. Overall, U2 Live at Red Rocks spent 152 weeks on the Top Music Videocassettes/Top Music Videos chart. In April 1985, the video appeared on Billboard's Top Videocassette Sales chart at number 29, and remained on the chart for 14 weeks. Billboard attributed the late increase in the video's sales to U2's sold-out Unforgettable Fire Tour, and called it "a textbook example of a group's current status having a direct influence on video sales".

== Legacy ==
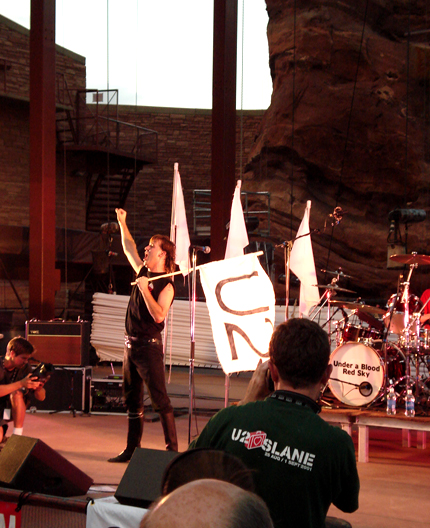
In 2007, the U2 tribute act "Under a Blood Red Sky" reenacted U2's Red Rocks show.

U2's Red Rocks concert is often cited as a watershed moment in their history that established their reputation as an exceptional live act. In the liner notes of the remastered version of the film, music journalist Anthony DeCurtis wrote, "this concert set goals for U2 that might have daunted any other young band. But in the shadow of their wild ambitions at Red Rocks, these four boys met, once again, the men of their future, and became who they would become." In 1999, Entertainment Weekly ranked the show 40th on its list of "The 100 Greatest Moments in Rock Music", saying that "the mystic, against-all-odds performance... was a spiritual and commercial breakthrough" that "transformed U2 from college-radio underdogs into A-list rock heroes". In 2004, Rolling Stone called the band's performance of "Sunday Bloody Sunday" from the film one of the "50 Moments that Changed the History of Rock and Roll". The magazine said, "[t]he sight of Bono singing the anti-violence anthem 'Sunday Bloody Sunday' while waving a white flag through crimson mist (created by a combination of wet weather, hot lights and the illumination of those crags) became the defining image of U2's warrior-rock spirit and—shown in heavy rotation on MTV—broke the band nationwide." Director Gavin Taylor said that the video "kick-started their career" and "fired them like a rocket into the sky". A 2005 industry poll of "The World's Greatest Gigs" ranked U2's Red Rocks show the 8th-greatest in rock history. In 2009, Relix named it the 24th-best concert since 1959.

The Denver Post said the concert affirmed Red Rocks Amphitheatre's status as a premier outdoor venue. Rocky Mountain News said that the concert was "[e]asily one of the most famous, acclaimed concerts of the 1980s (if not all time)", and that people who have visited the Amphitheatre ever since have been disappointed to learn that the pyres are not part of the venue and were only used for the U2 concert. Music biographer Dave Thompson said the concert "transformed U2 ... into a very successful rock band", and that without U2, "Red Rocks would be just another smartly lit amphitheater". In 2003, U2 were inducted into the Red Rocks Hall of Fame, which is on display in the venue's visitor center; the amphitheatre's official website states that U2's performance "paved the way for other great artists such as Stevie Nicks, the Moody Blues, John Tesh and Neil Young to record live concert videos at Red Rocks, and helped the Amphitheatre gain its reputation as one of the premier venues in the world".

In June 2007, a U2 tribute band named Under a Blood Red Sky performed a note-for-note recreation of U2's performance at Red Rocks. That same week, the City of Denver unsuccessfully tried to persuade U2 to return to Red Rocks. During the PopMart Tour in 1997, Bono stated that because of low ticket sales for their Denver concert at Mile High Stadium, a return to the more intimate Red Rocks setting held appeal. However, in a 2008 interview, Barry Fey said that he had questioned U2 about performing at Red Rocks again, to which they replied, "Absolutely not". On both occasions, Fey said that U2 could never top their original performance and that returning to Red Rocks would be "foolish" and "a no-win situation" for the group.

== Track listing ==
Original release (Note: "Cry / The Electric Co." was included in the release, but excluded from the track listing for legal reasons. "Sunday Bloody Sunday" and "I Threw a Brick Through a Window" were listed as "Sunday, Bloody Sunday" [sic] and "I Threw a Brick", respectively.)

1. "Surrender"
2. "Seconds"
3. "Sunday, Bloody Sunday" [sic]
4. "Cry" / "The Electric Co."
5. "October"
6. "New Year's Day"
7. "I Threw a Brick" [sic]
8. "A Day Without Me"
9. "Gloria"
10. "Party Girl"
11. "11 O'Clock Tick Tock"
12. "I Will Follow"
13. "40"

2008 edition (DVD)

1. "Out of Control"
2. "Twilight"
3. "An Cat Dubh" / "Into the Heart"
4. "Surrender"
5. "Two Hearts Beat as One"
6. "Seconds"
7. "Sunday Bloody Sunday"
8. "Cry" / "The Electric Co."
9. "October"
10. "New Year's Day"
11. "I Threw a Brick Through a Window"
12. "A Day Without Me"
13. "Gloria"
14. "Party Girl"
15. "11 O'Clock Tick Tock"
16. "I Will Follow"
17. "40"

== Personnel ==
U2

- Bono – lead vocals, guitar on "A Day Without Me"
- The Edge – guitar, piano, backing vocals, lap steel guitar on "Surrender", bass guitar on "40", co-lead vocals on "Seconds"
- Adam Clayton – bass guitar, guitar on "40", backing vocals on "I Will Follow", "Twilight" and "Out of Control"
- Larry Mullen Jr. – drums, backing vocals

Film crew

- Malcolm Gerrie – production associate
- Paul McGuinness for U2 at Red Rocks Associates – executive producer
- Doug Stewart – producer
- Gavin Taylor – director
- Rick Wurpel – producer

== Charts ==
=== Weekly charts ===
Chart (1986)	Peak position
US Cash Box Top Music Videocassettes	10

Chart (1987)	Peak position
US Top Music Videocassettes (Billboard)	3

Chart (2008–2009)	Peak position
Belgian Music DVD (Ultratop Wallonia)	3
Belgian Music DVD (Ultratop Flanders)	2
Dutch Music DVD (MegaCharts)	5
French Music DVD (SNEP)	9
Italian Music DVD (FIMI)	13
Spanish Music DVD (Promusicae)	10
Swiss Albums (Schweizer Hitparade)	3
UK Music Videos (Official Charts)	8

=== Year-end charts ===
Chart (1985)	Position
US Top Music Videocassettes (Billboard)	8

Chart (1987)	Position
US Top Music Videocassettes (Billboard)	7

Chart (2008)	Position
Dutch Music DVD (MegaCharts)	24
