= 40 (U2 song) =

Single by U2

from the album War
- B-side: "Two Hearts Beat as One"
- Released: August 1983
- Recorded: September–November 1982
- Studio: Windmill Lane (Dublin)
- Genre: Rock; post-punk
- Length: 2:35
- Label: Island
- Songwriter: U2
- Producer: Steve Lillywhite

U2 singles chronology
"Sunday Bloody Sunday" (1983)	"40" (1983)	"Pride (In the Name of Love)" (1984)

"40", also known as "40 (How Long)", is a song by Irish rock band U2. It is the tenth and final track on their 1983 album, War. The song is noted for its live performances; guitarist the Edge and bassist Adam Clayton trade instruments during performances of it, and as it was commonly played to end their concerts, the band would leave the stage one-by-one as the audience continued to sing the refrain "How long to sing this song?". The lyrics are a modification of the Bible's Psalm 40.

The song was released as a commercial single only in Germany, simply to promote U2's appearance at the Loreley Festival in 1983. The single was released on a 7-inch gramophone record with a B-side of the album version of "Two Hearts Beat as One". Since its live debut on 26 February 1983, in Dundee during the War Tour, "40" has been a staple of U2's live concerts, having been performed almost 400 times.

== Recording ==
When we were making our third record, the War LP, we were being thrown out of the studio by the studio manager because we had overrun or something and we had one more song to do. We wrote this song in about ten minutes, we recorded it in about ten minutes, we mixed it in about ten minutes and we played it, then, for another ten minutes and that's nothing to do with why it's called "40".

— Bono, Concert April 29, 1987

The song was completed within the last few hours of the recording sessions for War. After working all night on the album in Windmill Lane Studios, U2 found themselves at 6 a.m. feeling that they were still one song short. Another band, Minor Detail, were scheduled to start their recording session at 8 a.m. and had arrived early, and U2 bassist Adam Clayton had already gone home. In a moment of inspiration, the remaining members—Bono, the Edge, and Larry Mullen Jr.—decided to revive an abandoned song that the Edge described as having "a great bass hook but a slightly unwieldy arrangement with lots of strange sections and time changes" that they had been unable to translate into a "coherent song". Producer Steve Lillywhite quickly did a multi-track edit of the song, removing any parts that seemed disconnected from the main musical idea. With Clayton absent, the Edge switched between guitar and bass guitar. In search of lyrical inspiration, Bono opened the Bible and found Psalm 40, on which he based his words. As soon as his vocals were recorded and the song mixed, the band immediately exited the studio, completing the sessions for War.

== Live performances ==
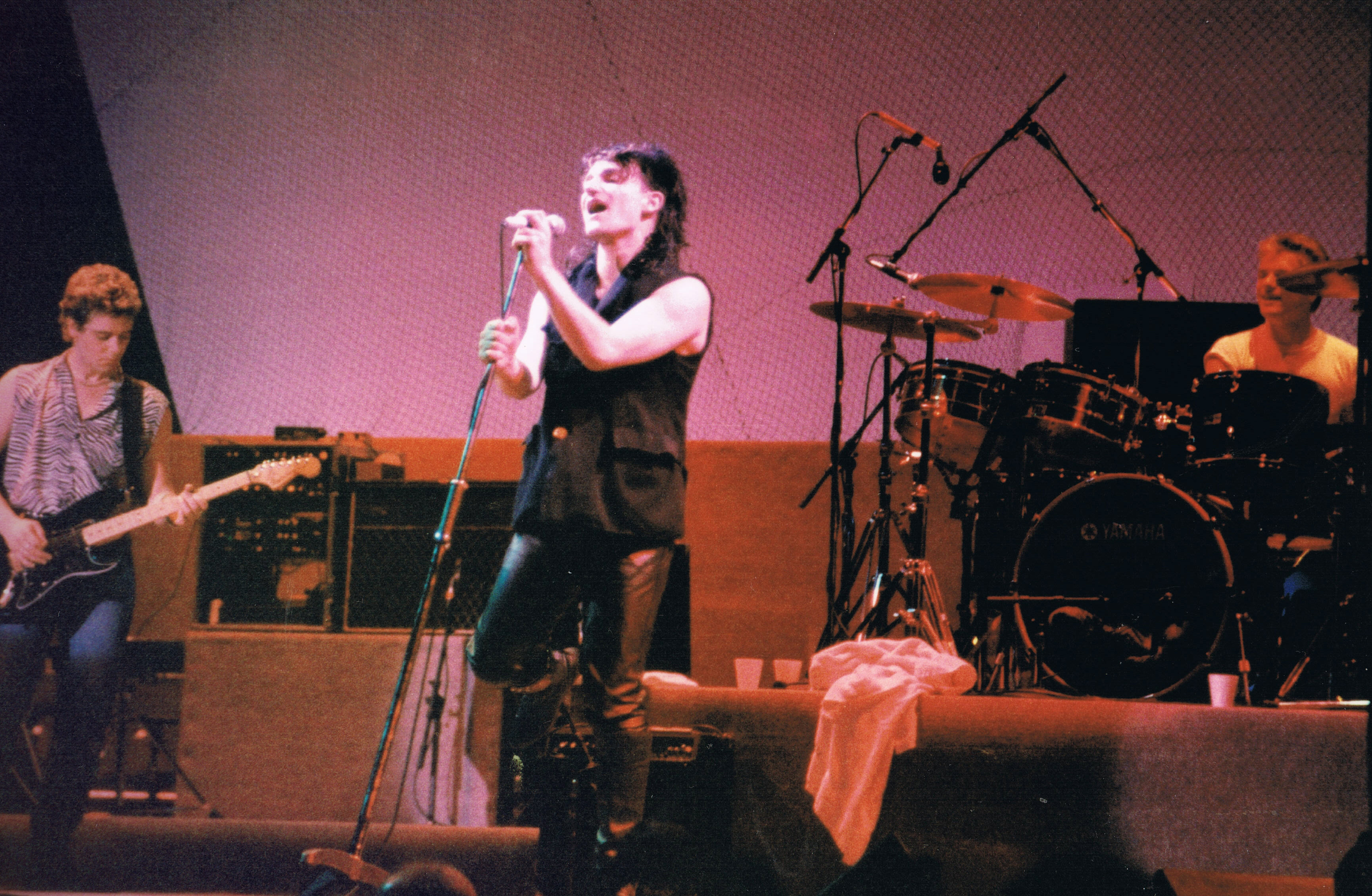
U2 performing "40" in Sydney in September 1984. Bassist Adam Clayton can be seen playing guitar on the left.

"40" debuted live on 26 February 1983 in Dundee as the final song of the show, and closed every single concert on 1983's War Tour. It became very popular as a concert closer, and between its debut and 10 January 1990, there were roughly only 24 concerts that did not feature "40" as the closing song. During live performances, Clayton and the Edge would swap instruments so that Clayton played guitar and Edge played bass, and the band members would progressively leave stage, with Bono the first to depart, then Clayton, then Edge, and finally Mullen. The crowd would often continue to chant the refrain of "How long...to sing this song?" even after the band had left the stage. Live performances of the song are included on the 1983 live album Under a Blood Red Sky and the 1984 concert film U2 Live at Red Rocks: Under a Blood Red Sky.

Between January 1990 and March 2005, full performances of "40" were extremely rare, though on 2001's Elevation Tour, it was regularly snippeted at the end of "Bad" before the song segued into "Where the Streets Have No Name". "40" made a return to the regular set list in March 2005 on the Vertigo Tour and subsequently closed many of the tour's shows: it closed most on the first leg, three on the second, rotated with other songs (mainly "Bad") for closing duties on the third leg, made only a few appearances on the fourth leg, and was snippeted a few times rather than being played in full on the fifth leg. During the U2 360° Tour in 2011, it was snippeted in Pittsburgh (the final American tour date) and was revived on the last night of that tour in Moncton, New Brunswick, as the tour's final song. It is U2's 15th-most performed live song, or 12-most performed if snippets are included in its total. The song made its Innocence + Experience Tour debut on 27 May 2015 in Inglewood, and was dedicated to the memory of their recently deceased tour manager Dennis Sheehan, before going on to close many of the subsequent shows on that tour. "40" was also played as the closing song at the final show of U2's 2023–2024 concert residency, U2:UV Achtung Baby Live, at Sphere in the Las Vegas Valley.

== Track listing ==
1. "40 (How Long)" (Album Version) – 2:35
2. "Two Hearts Beat as One" (Album Version) – 4:02

This is the only known single release, distributed only in Germany. The song was titled "40 (How Long)" for this release.

== See also ==
- List of covers of U2 songs - "40"
