= Refugee (charity album) =

Charity compilation album

Compilation album
- Released: 2016
- Compiler: Robin Adams

Refugee is a charity album curated by Scottish singer-songwriter Robin Adams. The album includes original song contributions from Bonnie Prince Billy, Linda Thompson, Ricky Ross, Alasdair Roberts, Richard Dawson, BMX Bandits, Kathryn Joseph, Robin Adams, and others.

The album was recorded to raise funds for the refugee crisis in its many forms, from Syria and beyond. All proceeds raised by the album continue to go to MOAS (Migrant Offshore Aid Station).

== Reception ==
As well as raising funds for MOAS, the record was successful in raising awareness for the refugee crises, with multiple news and music publications covering the charity release.

== Track listing ==
No.	Artist	Title
1.	BMX Bandits	How Not to Care
2.	Mike and Solveig	Ravioli
3.	Alasdair Roberts	Scarce of Fishing
4.	Robin Adams	The Devils War and God's Blue Sea
5.	Piers Faccini	This Morning the Birds
6.	Jenny Lysander	The Horn Stills Blows
7.	Ricky Ross	Baby What's to Know
8.	Linda Thompson	Witchseason
9.	Bonnie Prince Billy	Most People
10.	Rick Redbeard	Postcards
11.	Rachel Sermanni	Innocent Journey
12.	Kathryn Joseph	The Lines
13.	Roddy Hart	West
14.	Dana Falconberry	The Dusk
15.	Richard Dawson	To the Sea
