= City of Refuge =

City of Refuge may refer to:

== Places ==
- Cities of Refuge, the six biblical places referred to by that title
- Ararat, City of Refuge, planned Jewish settlement in New York, United States
- City of Refuge (Atlanta), a homeless ministry in Atlanta, Georgia
- Puuhonua o Honaunau, the Hawaiian location known as "City of Refuge"
- City of Refuge Church in Gardena, California, US, led by Noel Jones

== Music ==
- "City of Refuge", another name for the song "I'm Gonna Run to the City of Refuge"
- City of Refuge (Abigail Washburn album), 2011, or the title song
- City of Refuge (John Fahey album), 1997
- City of Refuge, 2008 album by John French, onetime drummer for Captain Beefheart's Magic Band

== See also ==
- Sanctuary city
