= I Will Follow =

- UK/Irish cover

Single by U2

from the album Boy
- Released: 24 October 1980
- Recorded: July–September 1980
- Studio: Windmill Lane (Dublin)
- Genre: Post-punk
- Length: 3:37
- Label: CBS Ireland; Island
- Songwriter: U2
- Producer: Steve Lillywhite

U2 1980s singles chronology
"A Day Without Me" (1980)	"I Will Follow" (1980)	"Fire" (1981)

U2 2000s singles chronology
"I'll Go Crazy If I Don't Go Crazy Tonight" (2009)	"I Will Follow (live from Glastonbury)" (2011)	"Blow Your House Down" (2011)

Music video
- "I Will Follow" on YouTube

"I Will Follow" is a song by the Irish rock band U2. It is the opening track from their debut album, Boy, and it was released as the album's second single in October 1980. Lead singer Bono wrote the lyrics to "I Will Follow" in tribute to his mother Iris Hewson, who died when he was 14 years old.

"I Will Follow" is the only song that U2 have performed on every tour since they released their first album. The song was U2's first music video, directed by Meiert Avis in Dublin, Ireland. The song was issued five times, first in 1981 on a 7" vinyl in Ireland, the United Kingdom, Australia, and New Zealand, second on the same format in the United States and Canada, third in the Netherlands in 1982 with a track from 1981's October, in 1983 with a live version of the song, and finally in 2011 with a live version of the song recorded at the 2011 Glastonbury Festival.

== Composition ==
"I Will Follow" was written three weeks before U2 began recording Boy. During early rehearsals of the song, the group frequently had loud arguments, as lead vocalist Bono was struggling to convey the aggression for the guitar riff that he was envisioning. Frustrated, he took the Edge's guitar from him and "hammer[ed] away" on the two-stringed chord the Edge had created to show his bandmates the urgency he wanted. Bono said, "It was literally coming out of a kind of rage, the sound of a nail being hammered into your frontal lobe". Producer Steve Lillywhite stated that Siouxsie and the Banshees guitarist John McKay's playing on the song "Jigsaw Feeling" (1978) was a point of reference for the Edge on "I Will Follow", calling the beginning of both songs "almost identical".

Bono has said that he wrote the lyrics from the perspective of his mother Iris Hewson, who died in 1974 when he was 14 years old, and that they were about the unconditional love a mother has for her child. The song features a glockenspiel to provide what Bono called "underlying instrumental colouring"; it was added at his suggestion, and was played during the Boy recording sessions by him and the Edge. For the middle eight section of the song, Lillywhite recorded the sounds of cutlery rubbing against the spokes of a spinning wheel on an upturned bicycle, as well as Bono smashing bottles.

== Release ==
Record World reviewed the original single release in 1980, describing the song as an "electronic rocker" in which the "urgent vocals match the intense keyboard pulse."

"I Will Follow" had a second single release as a live version in the Netherlands and Germany in 1982, and a third release in the United States in 1983, taken from the Under a Blood Red Sky album. It appeared on both the 1998 compilation album and video collection The Best of 1980–1990, and in some countries, on the 2006 U218 Singles compilation.

The song is included in the 2015 music video game Rock Band 4 as a playable track.

== Live performances ==
It is the band's second most frequently performed song with over 1000 performances, only behind "Pride (In the Name of Love)". It has been performed at every concert of The Joshua Tree Tour (1987), PopMart Tour (1997-1998), Innocence + Experience Tour (2015), and Experience + Innocence Tour (2018). It has been played extensively on every tour; exceptions to this are the 1992–1993 Zoo TV Tour (where it was performed infrequently as part of the acoustic set), the U2 360° Tour (where it was not played until the third leg in 2010) and The Joshua Tree Tour 2017 (where it was sporadically performed as the concert closer). For The Joshua Tree Tour 2019 however, it was again played regularly as the second song of the show.

The song appears on the live recordings/films Under a Blood Red Sky (1983), U2 Live at Red Rocks: Under a Blood Red Sky (1984), Live from the Point Depot (2004), PopMart: Live from Mexico City (1998), Elevation 2001: Live from Boston (2001), Live from Boston 1981 (2004), Live from Paris, (2007) and U22 (2012). It also appears on Vertigo 05: Live from Milan, the bonus DVD that is included with the U218 Singles compilation and as a bonus track for UK/Australia releases of the CD.

U2 performed the song on the BBC2 television show The Old Grey Whistle Test in 1981. The performance was later released on DVD on a compilation of performances from the show.

== Reception and legacy ==
In 2005, Blender ranked the song at number 214 on its list "The 500 Greatest Songs Since You Were Born". The magazine wrote, "The first song on U2's first album introduced the guitar sound that would define their work. [...] The arena-ready clarion call also established Bono's trademark lyrical earnestness, one of the reasons the song remains a fan favorite and a staple of the band's recent tours." In 2023, "I Will Follow" was selected and re-recorded for the band's album Songs of Surrender.

== Formats and track listings ==
7" Ireland, UK, Australia, and New Zealand release
No.	Title	Length
1.	"I Will Follow"	3:37
2.	"Boy-Girl" (Live from the Marquee Club, London, England, September 22, 1980)	3:24

7" Canada and US release
No.	Title	Length
1.	"I Will Follow"	3:37
2.	"Out of Control" (Live at Paradise Rock Club, Boston, Massachusetts, March 6, 1981)	4:25

The Netherlands release
No.	Title	Length
1.	"I Will Follow" (Live at 't Heem, Hattem, the Netherlands, May 14, 1982)	3:51
2.	"Gloria"	4:12

1983 release
No.	Title	Length
1.	"I Will Follow" (Live from West Germany, August 20, 1983)	3:40
2.	"Two Hearts Beat as One" (Import mix)	3:42

2011 Glastonbury release
No.	Title	Length
1.	"I Will Follow" (Live at Glastonbury Festival 2011, Somerset, England, June 24, 2011)	4:01

Note

- The Netherlands release was recorded for the Veronica TV concert series Countdown, and was reissued in Germany in 1983. The cover of the Canadian and U.S. releases feature the same image as the North American release of Boy. The 1983 release was in a generic red sleeve with no cover artwork.

== Personnel ==
U2

- Bono – vocals, glockenspiel
- The Edge – guitar, glockenspiel
- Adam Clayton – bass guitar
- Larry Mullen Jr. – drums

Additional personnel

- Steve Lillywhite – producer, sound effects

== Charts ==
=== 1981 release ===
Chart (1981)	Position
Australia (Kent Music Report)	71
New Zealand (Recorded Music NZ)	34
US Billboard Top Tracks	20
US Dance Club Songs (Billboard)	34

=== 1982 release ===
Chart (1982)	Position
Netherlands (Dutch Top 40)	12

=== 1983 release ===
Chart (1984)	Position
US Billboard Hot 100	81

== See also ==
- List of covers of U2 songs (A-M) § I Will Follow
