= Gloria (U2 song) =

- UK/Irish cover, also used for the Australian limited edition release

Single by U2

from the album October
- Released: 5 October 1981
- Recorded: July–August 1981
- Studio: Windmill Lane (Dublin)
- Genre: Rock, post-punk
- Length: 4:12
- Label: CBS Ireland; Island
- Songwriter: U2
- Producer: Steve Lillywhite

U2 singles chronology
"Fire" (1981)	"Gloria" (1981)	"A Celebration" (1982)

Alternative cover
- 2021 Record Store Day edition of Gloria

Music video
- "Gloria" on YouTube

"Gloria" is a song by rock band U2. It is the opening track and second single from the band's 1981 album, October.

It features a chorus sung in Latin, from the liturgical "Gloria in Excelsis Deo". It was one of their lowest-charting singles on the UK singles chart, peaking at number 55 but was more successful in Ireland and New Zealand, reaching the Top 20.

AllMusic cited the song as an example of "when U2 marry the message, melody, and sound together... the results are thoroughly impressive", while Pitchfork said the song "displays some musical dynamism, but its Latin-language chorus tempers its anthemic qualities."

== Composition ==
"Gloria" highlights bassist Adam Clayton as it features him utilizing three styles of playing in four minutes: using a pick for most of the song, switching to fingerstyle during the Edge's slide guitar part, and then a "slap & pop" solo towards the end.

The chorus "Gloria in te Domine / Gloria exultate" translates to "Glory in You, Lord / Glory, exalt [Him]" with "exalt" in the imperative mood, a reference to Psalm 30:2 (in te Domine, speravi). The song also contains references to Colossians 2:9-10 ("Only in You I'm complete") and James 5:7-9 ("The door is open / You're standing there").

The song also references Van Morrison's 1964 love song "Gloria". Bono is quoted in the 1994 book Race of Angels:

I actually really like that lyric. It was written really quickly. I think it expresses the thing of language again, this thing of speaking in tongues, looking for a way out of language. "I try to sing this song... I try to stand up but I can't find my feet." And taking this Latin thing, this hymn thing. It's so outrageous at the end going to the full Latin whack. That still makes me smile. It's so wonderfully mad and epic and operatic. And of course Gloria is about a woman in the Van Morrison sense. Being an Irish band, you're conscious of that. And I think that what happened at that moment was very interesting: people saw that you could actually write about a woman in the spiritual sense and that you could write about God in the sexual sense. And that was a moment. Because before that there had been a line. That you can actually sing to God, but it might be a woman? Now, you can pretend it's about God, but not a woman!

== Live performances ==
"Gloria" has been played in concert more than 370 times. It was debuted on the October Tour prior to the release of the album, and was introduced as "Gloria and Gloria" by Bono. It was played on every tour up to and including the Lovetown Tour, after which it was not played for fifteen years until the Vertigo Tour where it made several appearances. It was once again revived on U2's 2015 Innocence + Experience Tour where it was played second in the set list. It often rotated with other early U2 hits such as "The Electric Co.", and "Out of Control". The song was played again on the Experience + Innocence Tour, where it often rotated with "All Because of You" and "Red Flag Day". It was played twice on The Joshua Tree Tour 2019, taking the place of "I Will Follow" both times.

Live recordings of the song appear on Under a Blood Red Sky and the Live at Red Rocks: Under a Blood Red Sky DVD. A live version from the Hammersmith Palais is also available on the October (Special Edition) CD.

== Music video ==
The "Gloria" video, written and directed by Meiert Avis, was filmed in October 1981 in Grand Canal Dock in Dublin, near Windmill Lane, and featured U2 performing on a barge while a crowd of onlookers dance. "Gloria" was the first U2 music video that received heavy airplay on MTV, but neither the song nor the video have been included in any of the band's compilations.

== Track listing ==
No.	Title	Length
1.	"Gloria"	4:12
2.	"I Will Follow" (Live at Paradise Rock Club, Boston, Massachusetts, 6 March 1981)	3:48

2021 Record Store Day 40th Anniversary Edition
No.	Title	Length
1.	"Gloria"
2.	"Gloria (Live From The LoveTown Tour, The Point Depot, Dublin, 31 December 1989)"
3.	"Gloria (Live From The Vertigo Tour, Boston, 26 May 2005)"
4.	"Gloria (Live From The Innocence + Experience Tour, London, 29 October 2015)"

== Charts ==
Chart (1981–82)	Peak position
Australia (Kent Music Report)	32
Irish Singles Chart	10
New Zealand (Recorded Music NZ)	15
UK Singles Chart	55

== See also ==
- List of covers of U2 songs – Gloria
