= New Year's Day (U2 song) =

1983 single by U2

- Standard European artwork (pictured variant used for 12-inch maxi-single and later CD editions)

Single by U2

from the album War
- B-side: "Treasure (Whatever Happened to Pete the Chop)"
- Released: 10 January 1983
- Recorded: September–November 1982
- Studio: Windmill Lane (Dublin)
- Genre: Post-punk; new wave
- Length: 5:36 (album version); 5:40 (original 12-inch long version); 4:17 (video version); 3:53 (7-inch edit)
- Label: CBS Ireland; Island
- Songwriter: U2
- Producer: Steve Lillywhite

U2 singles chronology
"A Celebration" (1982)	"New Year's Day" (1983)	"Two Hearts Beat as One" (1983)

Music video
- "New Year's Day" on YouTube

Audio sample
- file; help

"New Year's Day" is a song by Irish rock band U2. It is the third track on their 1983 album War and was released as the album's lead single in January 1983. With lyrics written about the Polish Solidarity movement, "New Year's Day" is driven by Adam Clayton's distinctive bassline and the Edge's piano and guitar playing. It was U2's first UK hit single, peaking at number 10, and also their first international hit, reaching number 9 in Norway, number 11 on the Dutch Top 40, number 17 in Sweden, and number 53 on the Billboard Hot 100 in the United States, becoming the band's first single to chart in the US.

In 2004, the song was ranked 427th on Rolling Stone's list of "The 500 Greatest Songs of All Time". It was also included in the Pitchfork 500.

The UK cover has a photograph of Peter Rowen, who grew up near the group's lead vocalist Bono in Ireland.

== Writing and composition ==
The lyric had its origins in a love song from Bono to his wife, but was subsequently reshaped and inspired by the Polish Solidarity movement. The bassline stemmed from bassist Adam Clayton trying to figure out the chords to the Visage song "Fade to Grey" during a soundcheck.

In 1983, Bono said of the song, "It would be stupid to start drawing up battle lines, but I think the fact that 'New Year's Day' made the Top Ten indicated a disillusionment among record buyers. I don't think 'New Year's Day' was a pop single, certainly not in the way that Mickie Most might define a pop single as something that lasts three minutes and three weeks in the chart. I don't think we could have written that kind of song."

== Music video ==
The video was one of their first to be played frequently on MTV. It was filmed in December 1982 in Sälen and Mora, Sweden, and directed by Meiert Avis. The band only appeared in the performance scenes of the video, for it was filmed in the depth of the Swedish winter. U2 guitarist Edge said in the band's official biography that the four people riding on horseback in the video who appeared to be the members of U2 were in fact four Swedish teenage girls with masks over their faces as disguises – employed because the band were frozen from shooting the video in sub-freezing temperatures on the previous day. The biography says Bono refused to wear any headgear despite the cold weather, and had a lot of trouble mouthing the lyrics. The video featured footage of Soviet Red Army troops advancing in winter during World War II in attacks with T-34 tanks.

U2 allowed free-of-charge use of this song in a spot prepared by the European Commission. This clip, published on YouTube, shows a transformation of Poland in the last 20 years, mixed with short scenes from today's Warsaw seen from a perspective of a 20-year-old woman.

== Live performances ==
"New Year's Day", U2's seventh-most frequently performed live song, has been a standard on every U2 tour since its debut on 1 December 1982 at the first show of the War Tour's Pre-Tour. However, the Innocence + Experience Tour only featured three performances of the song.

In concert, the Edge switches between piano and guitar during the song. In 1980s performances he used a Fender Stratocaster and a Yamaha CP70 electric grand piano. During the 1990s and 2000s he alternated between a Gibson Les Paul Custom and Les Paul Standard. The Les Paul that the Edge used during the writing of "New Year's Day" was sold for charity. Until the Elevation Tour, Clayton normally used a chorus effect on his bass guitar when performing this song live.

"New Year's Day" has appeared on many of U2's concert video releases including 1983's U2 Live at Red Rocks: Under a Blood Red Sky, Zoo TV: Live from Sydney, PopMart: Live from Mexico City, U2 Go Home: Live from Slane Castle, Vertigo 2005: Live from Chicago, Live from Paris, and U2 3D.

U2 have never performed in concert the B-side of "New Year's Day", "Treasure (Whatever Happened to Pete the Chop?)", although they played an early version known simply as "Pete the Chop" at some concerts in 1980.

When the band played "New Year's Day" during the Vertigo Tour performance at Silesian Stadium in Poland, the crowd surprised the band when the lower sections waved red-coloured items while other sections waved white, creating the Polish flag. This was repeated during the U2 360° Tour at the same venue.

== Reception ==
In 2004, Rolling Stone placed the song at number 427 on its list of "The 500 Greatest Songs of All Time"; the song was re-ranked to 435th on the magazine's 2010 version of the list. The song was also included in the Pitchfork 500.

Cash Box said in its contemporary review of the single that "an agitated yet steady rhythm lays the foundation for this stark, AOR-slanted single by a thinking man's rock 'n' roll band."

== Formats and track listings ==
7-inch - Island / WIP 6848 (UK)
No.	Title	Length
1.	"New Year's Day" (Short version)	3:53
2.	"Treasure (Whatever Happened to Pete the Chop)"	3:24

7-inch - Island / 811 323-7 (France)
No.	Title	Length
1.	"New Year's Day" (Edit)	3:40
2.	"Treasure (Whatever Happened to Pete the Chop)"	3:24

7-inch - Island / 7S-86 (Japan)
No.	Title	Length
1.	"New Year's Day" (Special version)	4:16
2.	"Treasure (Whatever Happened to Pete the Chop)"	3:24

2x7-inch - Island / UWIP6848 (UK)
No.	Title	Length
1.	"New Year's Day" (Short version)	3:53
2.	"Treasure (Whatever Happened to Pete the Chop)"	3:24
3.	"Fire" (Live from Werchter, 4 July 1982)	3:45
4.	"I Threw a Brick Through a Window"/"A Day Without Me" (Live from Werchter, 4 July 1982)	6:58

12-inch - Island / 12 WIP 6848 (UK)
No.	Title	Length
1.	"New Year's Day" (Album version)	5:35
2.	"Treasure (Whatever Happened to Pete the Chop)"	3:24
3.	"Fire" (Live from Werchter, 4 July 1982)	3:45
4.	"I Threw a Brick Through a Window"/"A Day Without Me" (Live from Werchter, 4 July 1982)	6:58

12-inch - Island / 814 948-1 (France)
No.	Title	Length
1.	"New Year's Day" (U.S. remix)	4:30
2.	"Two Hearts Beat as One" (U.S. remix)	5:40

CD - Island / 664 973 (Austria)
No.	Title	Length
1.	"New Year's Day" (Album version)	5:35
2.	"Treasure (Whatever Happened to Pete the Chop)"	3:24
3.	"Fire" (Live from Werchter, 4 July 1982)	3:45
4.	"I Threw a Brick Through a Window"/"A Day Without Me" (Live from Werchter, 4 July 1982)	6:58

== Charts ==
=== Weekly charts ===
Weekly chart performance for "New Year's Day" by U2
Chart (1983)	Peak position
Australia (Kent Music Report)	36
Belgium (Ultratop 50 Flanders)	17
Canada Top Singles (RPM)	41
France (IFOP)	17
Ireland (IRMA)	2
Netherlands (Dutch Top 40)	11
Netherlands (Single Top 100)	9
New Zealand (Recorded Music NZ)	32
Norway (VG-lista)	9
Sweden (Sverigetopplistan)	17
UK Singles (Official Charts)	10
US Cash Box Top 100	50
US Billboard Hot 100	53
US Billboard Top Tracks	2
US Dance Club Songs (Billboard)	38

Chart (2010)	Peak position
Belgium (Ultratop 50 Back Catalogue Singles Flanders)	14

=== Year-end charts ===
Year-end chart performance for "New Year's Day" by U2
Chart (1983)	Position
Netherlands (Single Top 100)	97

== Certifications ==
Certifications for "New Year's Day"
Region	Certification	Certified units/sales
New Zealand (RMNZ) Live version	Gold	15,000^{‡}
^{‡} Sales+streaming figures based on certification alone.

== Musique remix ==
"New Year's Dub"

Single by Musique vs. U2
- Released: 21 May 2001
- Length: 2:57 (radio edit)
- Label: Serious
- Songwriters: U2; Moussa Clarke; Nick Hanson
- Producers: Nick Hanson; Moose

In May 2001, dance act Musique released a remix of the song, "New Year's Dub". The remix charted in some European countries, including in the UK and in Ireland, where it peaked at number 15 and number 13, respectively. It also charted in Australia, where it peaked at number 74.

=== Track listings ===
CD-Maxi Serious 572 922-2
No.	Title	Length
1.	"New Year's Dub" (7-inch Radio Edit)	2:57
2.	"New Year's Dub" (Mauro Picotto Club Mix)	8:38
3.	"New Year's Dub" (Hybrid Remix)	6:59

=== Weekly charts ===
Weekly chart performance for "New Year's Day" by Musique vs. U2
Chart (2001)	Peak position
Australia (ARIA)	74
Ireland (IRMA)	13
Netherlands (Single Top 100)	55
Switzerland (Schweizer Hitparade)	93
UK Singles (Official Charts)	15

=== Year-end charts ===
2001 year-end chart performance for "New Year's Day" by Musique vs. U2
Chart (2001)	Position
Canada (Nielsen SoundScan)	64

2002 year-end chart performance for "New Year's Day" by Musique vs. U2
Chart (2002)	Position
Canada (Nielsen SoundScan)	131

== See also ==
- List of cover versions of U2 songs – New Year's Day
