= Three (U2 EP) =

EP by U2
- Released: 2 September 1979
- Recorded: 4–5 August 1979
- Studios: Windmill Lane (Dublin, Ireland)
- Genre: Post-punk
- Length: 9:58
- Label: CBS Ireland
- Producers: U2; Chas de Whalley

U2 chronology
Three (1979)	Boy (1980)

Three, also known as U2 3, is the debut extended play by Irish rock band U2. It was released in Ireland on 2 September 1979 through the CBS Ireland record label.

Three comprises three songs recorded at Windmill Lane Studios in August 1979, with the label's A&R representative Chas de Whalley serving as producer. "Out of Control" appears on the A-side, with "Stories for Boys" and "Boy/Girl" on the B-side, the result of a listener poll on Dave Fanning's radio programme; the release is variously referred to as a single and an EP. It was the group's first chart success, selling all 1,000 copies of its limited-edition 12-inch vinyl almost immediately. The 7-inch vinyl release of Three reached number 19 on the Irish Singles Chart.

"Out of Control" and "Stories for Boys" were re-recorded the following year and included on the band's debut album, Boy. Three was reissued for Record Store Day Black Friday in November 2019 to commemorate the 40th anniversary of its original release.

== Background ==
=== Involvement of Jackie Hayden ===
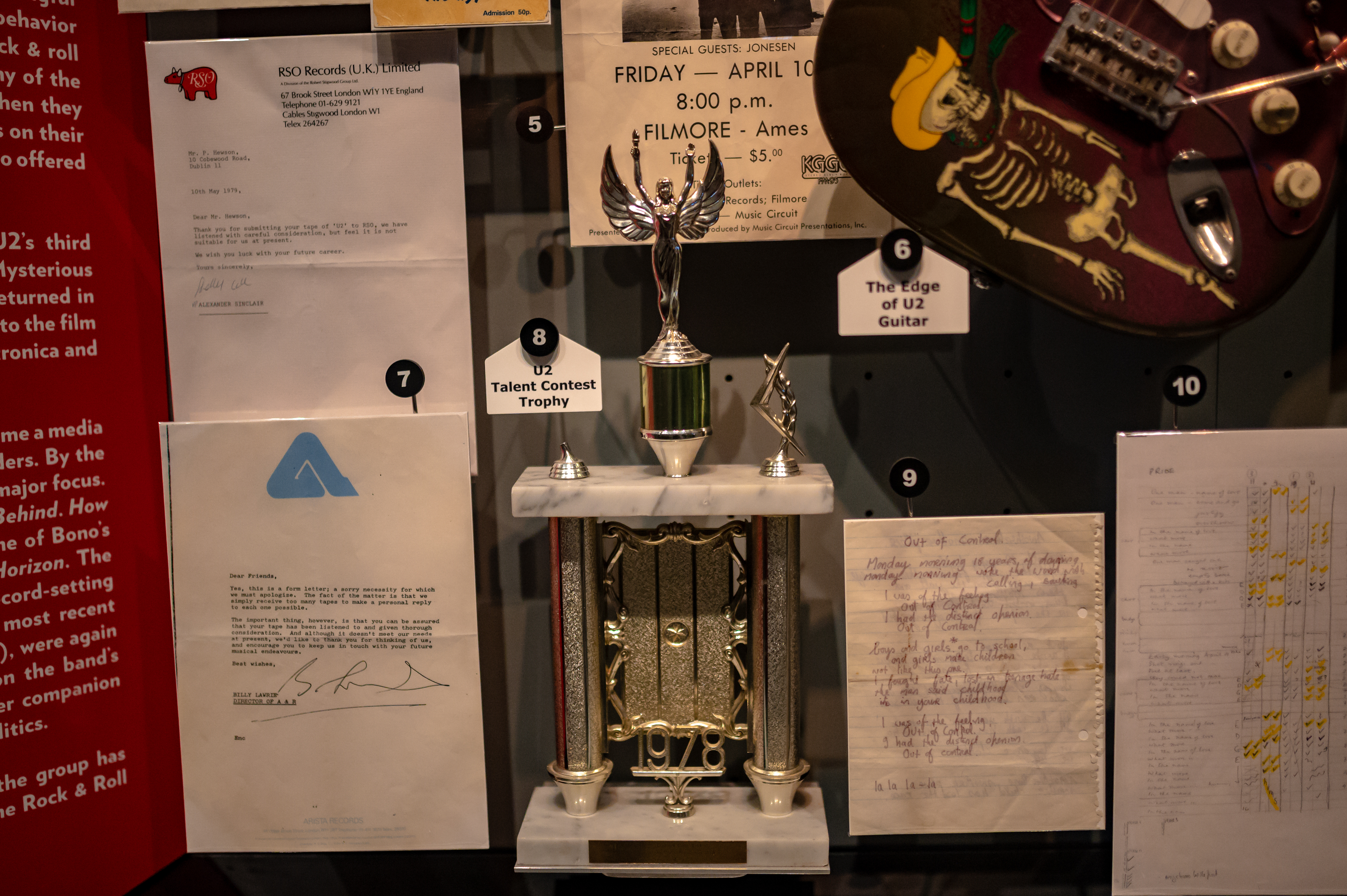
The trophy given to U2 for winning the 1978 Limerick Civic Week music talent contest. To the right are handwritten lyrics for the song "Out of Control", which is featured on Three.

U2 first came to the attention of Jackie Hayden, a representative for the CBS Records label, through their participation in a music talent contest as part of Limerick Civic Week on St. Patrick's Day in March 1978. Hayden was on the judging panel that selected U2 as the winning act, and their prize consisted of £500 and a chance to audition for the label. Watching U2 perform, Hayden "liked them instantly", as he was drawn to lead singer Bono's "supremely confident stage presence" and the "workmanlike fashion" in which the other band members played.

A few weeks later in April, the group were booked for a recording session at Keystone Studios in Dublin to fulfil CBS's commitment to the Limerick Civic Week Committee. Hayden oversaw the session but was not an experienced producer. The session was largely unsuccessful, as the band were "extremely nervous" about their first recording session. Bassist Adam Clayton said, "It was horrible, because nobody told us anything." The group were accustomed to playing together live, in a room or on stage, and they found it difficult to communicate with each other while spread out in the studio and separated by baffles.

Hayden said that the intent of the session was to record eight to ten songs to allow the label to better judge the band's repertoire, rather than spend the entire time refining a few tracks. However, he did not think the band understood that, as they were only able to complete one song, "Inside Out" (by Clayton's recollection). The session was supposed to last late into the night but ended abruptly at 11 p.m. after the father of drummer Larry Mullen Jr. arrived and demanded he take his 15-year-old son home, believing that school the following morning took priority. Hayden was unimpressed by the recordings from the session but liked the band's material and work ethic. The group asked if he was interested in managing them, but he declined.

Several weeks later, Bono and Clayton visited Hayden at his office to discuss a recording contract, with Clayton acting as U2's de facto manager at the time. Though no one at CBS Ireland other than Hayden was interested in the band, he wanted to remain involved in their career. He gave them a copy of a standard CBS Ireland contract to review, which would have included a commitment of two or three singles while giving CBS Ireland international rights to the material for five years. The group had concerns with the contract, but Hayden said the terms were non-negotiable and that CBS UK did not think CBS Ireland should be signing new acts at all. U2 amicably declined to sign the contract, believing it to be the wrong deal at the wrong time. They remained in contact with Hayden, who continued to attend their concerts and include them in his reports to CBS UK.

Hayden later met Paul McGuinness, who had agreed to manage U2 in mid-1978, and the two shared an enthusiasm for the group. Hayden expressed to McGuinness that the band would need a "very sympathetic producer" to translate the excitement of their live performances to studio recordings. McGuinness shared with him a second demo the group had recorded with producer Barry Devlin in November 1978, consisting of the songs "Street Missions", "Shadows and Tall Trees", and "The Fool". Hayden said it was "infinitely better" than the audition demo he had produced, but still thought "there was a major gap to be bridged" between the quality of the band live and in the studio. Excitement for U2 continued to build after their performance on 17–18 February 1979 at the Project Arts Centre during a 24-hour marathon festival called "Dark Space", which featured several British and Northern Irish acts. However, Hayden's continued advocacy for U2 was not currying him favour with CBS, which wanted him to focus on supporting their existing roster. Hayden did not want the label to miss out on an Irish band with potential international appeal, or for CBS UK to be seen as anti-Irish.

=== Involvement of Chas de Whalley ===
During a visit to London in February 1979, McGuinness met Chas de Whalley, an A&R representative for CBS UK. McGuinness played for him U2's latest demo, which was recorded at Eamonn Andrews Studios earlier that month. De Whalley said that they "sounded like a thousand other wannabe new wave acts and made no real impression on [his] jaded ears". However, his interest was piqued after talking to McGuinness and learning that U2 had won a CBS-sponsored contest. Word had circulated in the label's London office that Hayden was raving about them from Ireland. De Whalley convinced his bosses, Muff Winwood and assistant A&R director Nicky Graham, that U2 were worth a speculative visit. Winwood was still disappointed that his team had missed out on signing the Undertones and thus approved the trip, provided that de Whalley be accompanied by another A&R representative, Howard Thompson, who had successfully scouted Eddie and the Hot Rods and Motörhead.

De Whalley and Thompson arrived in Dublin in June 1979. McGuinness gave them VIP treatment, personally picking them up from the airport and taking them to a party hosted by a prominent Dublin advertising agency in a garden as part of "Strawberry Time". Afterwards, they attended a U2 concert at McGonagles, which was the first in a series of four "Jingle Balls – Christmas in June" shows. By this point, U2 had become rising stars in the Dublin scene, but de Whalley was still not overly impressed by the band, recalling: "They were a pretty damn average post-punk band. They weren't particularly good – a lot of sound and fury signifying not a great amount. Except that [Bono] was absolutely mesmerizing even then". De Whalley remarked to Thompson that he thought Bono would either be the next Alex Harvey and burn out after a few hits or become the next David Bowie and "be a major force in pop music".

De Whalley thought enough of U2 that upon returning to London, he pitched to Winwood the idea of recording them. CBS regularly gave aspiring bands a day's worth of recording time in the smallest of the label's three studios at Whitfield Street in London, at a cost of £100 to the A&R department, before the label made any decisions on whether to sign the act. McGuinness told de Whalley that he could secure a two-day session at Windmill Lane Studios, Dublin's most prestigious studio, at the same cost. De Whalley proposed to his boss that they record U2 in Dublin while the business affairs department worked out a deal to sign them to CBS Ireland. Winwood agreed to the idea, with the provision that "if it was a complete disaster", they could release the demo as a single in Ireland to capitalize on the band's popularity there and recoup the label's travel expenses without making a commitment to the band. De Whalley was appointed to produce the session.

U2 ultimately signed a five-year deal with CBS Ireland for their native country only; De Whalley suspected it was for a very small royalty rate, but by then McGuinness's priority was to secure a record release to jumpstart the band's career. News of the recording session made Hayden feel like they "were getting somewhere at last". After attending another one of the group's concerts at the Community Centre in Howth, de Whalley gained "a much better handle on what U2 were all about". He met with the band members at the Clayton family house to discuss which songs they would record, after which they decided on three: the new track "Boy/Girl", and fan favourites from the group's live set, "Stories for Boys" and "Out of Control".

== Recording ==
Three was recorded and mixed from 4–5 August 1979, during the weekend before Ireland's August Bank Holiday. De Whalley returned to Dublin that weekend and attended one of the band's now legendary Saturday afternoon concerts at Dandelion Market on 4 August, before heading to Windmill Lane Studios with them that evening for the recording session; it was the first of what would be many recordings there by the band during their career. The sessions lasted from 6 p.m. to midnight each day. The equipment for Clayton, Mullen, and guitarist the Edge was set up in the main studio room, while Bono's microphone was set up in the control room. This was done so Bono could record a guide vocal part that his bandmates could hear in their headphones that would not spill into their respective backing tracks. De Whalley said, "you wouldn't have known they were guide vocals by the way Bono went for them – giving it the full monty, arms flailing, legs pumping, willing his mates on the other side of the big plate glass window to pull out all the stops".

Although de Whalley had sat in on recording sessions before, he said that he was "no producer" and lacked the necessary technical and diplomatic skills. One of the toughest challenges he faced in the session with U2 was recording a suitable take of each song, as Mullen and Clayton were struggling to keep time. He said, "without the fuss and fury of a live show to hide behind, their tempos were not to be trusted". While adequate takes of "Stories for Boys" and "Boy/Girl" were eventually captured, the band had particular difficulty with "Out of Control". During a 24-bar section nearly two-thirds of the way into the song, the instrumentation was supposed to drop out for a "simple bass-drum figure" before building back up again. Mullen repeatedly lost his timing during this section, causing his bandmates to re-enter the song improperly. De Whalley insisted that the band record take after take until they got it right, as he thought it was their best song and needed to be coherent on record. This caused friction in the studio, particularly with Mullen. Bono was in disbelief that there was any issue with the rhythm section, telling de Whalley: "But Larry has lessons from one of the best drummers in Dublin! How can he be out of time?" Eventually, they completed a usable take of "Out of Control". De Whalley realised in retrospect that Clayton "operates on a slightly different sense of timing from virtually any other musician", which combined with Mullen's over-ambition, contributed to the band's rhythm issues.

The group reconvened at the studio on Sunday, 5 August, to mix the tracks. De Whalley recalled McGuinness passing him joints throughout the mixing: "Whether his plan was to help me pull down great ideas out of the ether or to get me so out of it I'd let him and the rest of the band call the shots, I don't know." The team agreed that the songs should sound "as tough as possible". De Whalley and the engineer, Bill, were aiming to emulate the musical style of the Ruts, a popular band at the time who had released "very rhythmically coherent post-punk records with a very tightly controlled driving guitar sound". In an attempt to copy their song, "Babylon's Burning", de Whalley and the staff applied extensive flanging to the Edge's guitar tracks.

Upon completion, de Whalley felt that the demos U2 had recorded with him were subpar. Sitting with Bono and the master tapes in the airport the following day, he felt that the flanger effect had not helped and that he had failed not only the band but also himself in his audition as a producer. He sensed that his bosses in London would not be excited by the recordings. McGuinness subsequently enlisted Robbie McGrath, the soundman for the Boomtown Rats, to remix the tracks.

== Release and promotion ==
Hayden "was astounded" by what he heard from de Whalley's demos and grew more excited about U2 after attending another performance of theirs at Dandelion Market. Hayden spoke to his colleagues at CBS the following week and attempted to convince them that the buzz around the band was legitimate. However, certain representatives in the London office felt that the group would only be successful if they replaced Mullen as their drummer. Hayden then received a call from a CBS UK executive telling him to stand down and that the label's A&R department could "take care of U-2 and Paul McGuinness". Shortly thereafter, the label's London office decided to pass on the band. According to Hayden, CBS UK Chairman Maurice Oberstein had allegedly enquired if U2 could be profitable for the label within a year, but after an A&R representative told him the band would need two to three years to develop, he declined to sign them.

Hayden met with McGuinness to inform him of the news and discuss the role the Irish market could play in garnering the band attention internationally. Hayden thought the group would need a distinctive release in their native country for it to be seen as "anything but another Irish single by another Irish rock band destined for the bargain bins". Hayden proposed releasing a three-track, 12-inch vinyl record in a limited edition of 1,000 copies, while McGuinness suggested a simultaneous 7-inch vinyl single of the same tracks. A meeting was subsequently arranged with CBS Ireland general manager David Duke to sign U2 to a record deal for Ireland only. Hayden traveled to London to meet with Graham, where he successfully lobbied for CBS UK to give the tapes of de Whalley's U2 demos to CBS Ireland, since the UK office was no longer interested in the band.

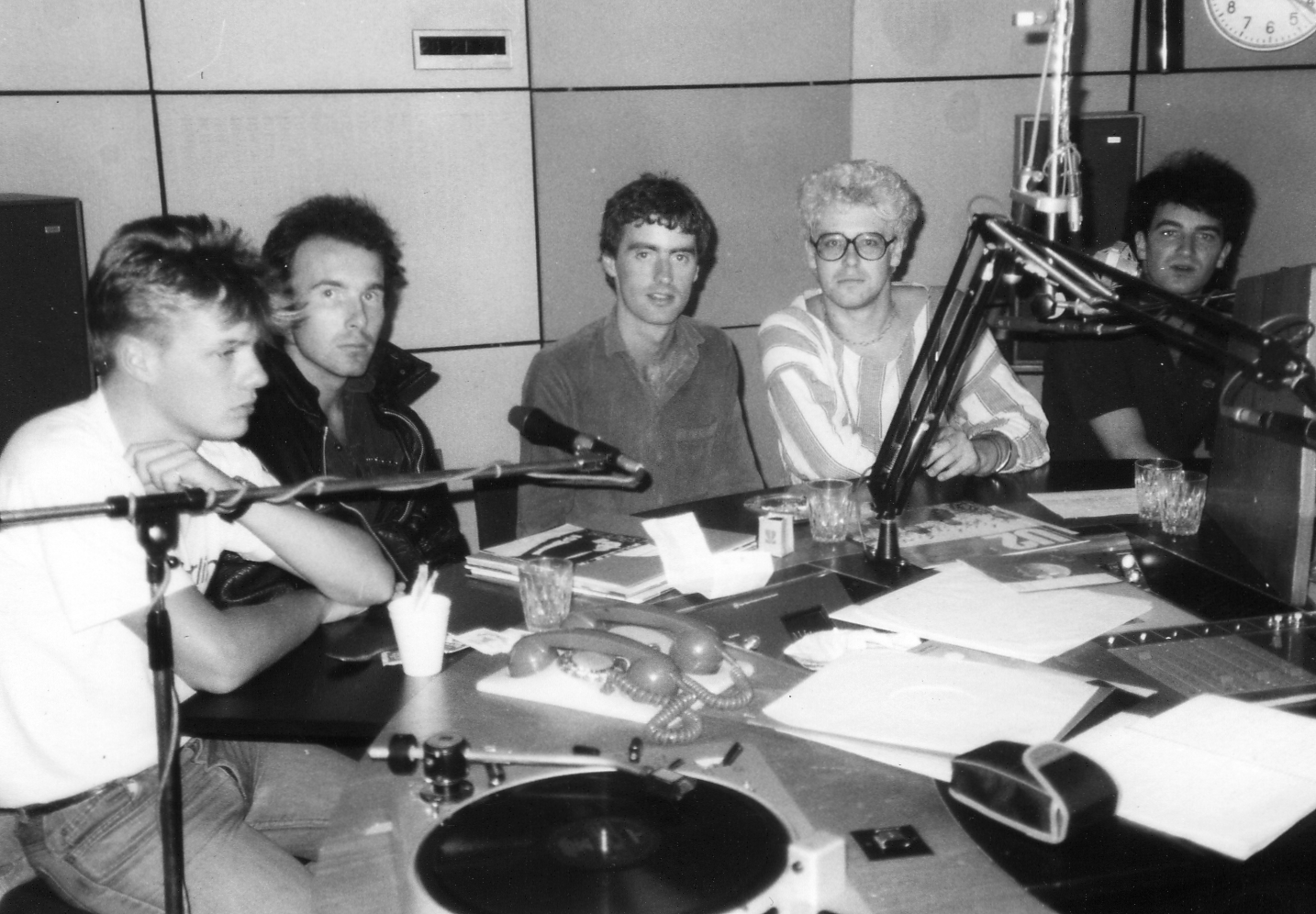
U2 with radio host Dave Fanning (center) in 1982. The record's A-side was chosen in a listener poll after Fanning played the three tracks on his programme.

McGuinness and Hayden devised a promotional strategy for the release that hinged on the Irish music magazine Hot Press and radio DJ Dave Fanning. Hayden used his rapport with the magazine's editor Niall Stokes to pitch the idea for a cover story about U2. Hot Press had never featured a group that had no recording history on their cover, but the magazine had been critically supportive of U2 to that point. Hayden and McGuinness argued that since "some people were prepared to lay their necks on the line" for the band, they deserved the magazine's support; Hot Press accepted the proposal. Hayden and McGuinness were also successful in asking Fanning to play the record's three songs on his radio programme on RTÉ and poll listeners on which one should appear on the A-side. A different member of U2 appeared on the show each night to play a different track. As a result of the listener poll, "Out of Control" was voted to be the A-side of the record, while the runners-up, "Boy/Girl" and "Stories for Boys", became the B-side.

A listening session was held at Windmill Lane Studios for the CBS staff to meet the members of U2 and hear the songs from Three for the first time. According to Hayden, since sales and store staff were traditionally ignored within the record industry, the listening session made them feel more enthusiastic and invested in the promotional plan for Three. After receiving the record shipment from a local pressing factory, Hayden personally numbered each 12-inch copy from 1 to 1,000. He contacted record stores that specialised in rock music and secured orders by promising them certain numbered copies, such as 1–25, 500, or 999.

Professional ratings
Review scores
Source	Rating
AllMusic	2.5/5 stars

Three was released by CBS Ireland in the Irish market on 26 September 1979. The 12-inch vinyl sold out almost immediately, becoming the highest-selling 12-inch record in Irish history. The 7-inch single spent two weeks on the Irish Singles Chart, peaking at number 19. After Geoff Travis of the record label Rough Trade Records imported copies of Three into the UK, the British music press took notice of U2.

Following Three, the band released the singles "Another Day", "11 O'Clock Tick Tock", and "A Day Without Me" before releasing their debut studio album, Boy, in 1980. "Out of Control" and "Stories for Boys" were re-recorded for Boy. Live versions of the two songs were also later featured on various releases, such as the "Sweetest Thing" single and the Live from Boston 1981 digital album. "Out of Control" also made an appearance on U2 Go Home: Live from Slane Castle, Ireland. A live version of "Boy/Girl" was later featured on the "I Will Follow" single. The original EP made its CD debut in 2008 as bonus tracks on the Boy reissue. It has been reissued six times, but it remains a rarity and was first released on compact disc in 2008 as part of the bonus disc with that year's reissue of Boy.

=== 40th anniversary reissue ===
Three was reissued for Record Store Day Black Friday in November 2019 to commemorate the 40th anniversary of its original release. It was pressed on a 12-inch vinyl single weighing 180 grams and cut at 45 RPM, and was made available in a limited edition of 17,000 copies. All three songs were remastered for the reissue.

== Performance history ==
U2 performed all songs from Three live regularly in the band's formative years. The earliest known performances of "Out of Control" and "Stories for Boys" took place in August 1979. "Out of Control" was written on Bono's eighteenth birthday. "Boy/Girl" may have also been played at this stage: a song named "In Your Hand" may have been related in some way to "Boy/Girl" but no recordings of it exist. The first confirmed performance of "Boy/Girl" took place in October 1979. All three songs were regularly performed on the Boy Tour in 1980–1981, although "Boy/Girl" appeared less than the others. "Stories for Boys", which premiered at an unknown date in August 1979, was used as a concert opener a few times before being moved to late in the main setlist, nearer to "Out of Control", which was typically the last song of the main set. In mid-March 1981, the Three songs were united to close the main set. "Stories for Boys" was first, followed by "Boy/Girl", which segued into "Out of Control". This trilogy lasted until the end of the tour.

"Boy/Girl" and "Stories for Boys" did not remain in the band's live repertoire long after the end of the Boy Tour. "Boy/Girl" was played three times afterwards, while "Stories for Boys" was initially frequently performed on the October Tour before it was removed from the setlist in late March 1982. "Out of Control", however, remained in the band's live show for longer, rotating with "Gloria" as the concert opener on the War Tour and the first leg of the Unforgettable Fire Tour. It then appeared twice late in the Unforgettable Fire Tour before returning sporadically to the setlist on the third leg of the Joshua Tree Tour and three performances on the Lovetown Tour. "Out of Control" then had an absence from live shows of over eleven years. It was played again on 15 May 2001 on the Elevation Tour. After initial infrequent performances proved popular with fans, it became more regular in the setlist as the tour progressed. It was retained on the Vertigo Tour for special occasions; it was played a total of nine times, including instances in Toronto and Los Angeles where U2 performed it with local bands. "Out of Control" made its U2 360° Tour debut in São Paulo. It made 5 other U2 360° appearances. The song was also the closer to the Glastonbury 2011 set. The Vertigo Tour also saw part of "Stories for Boys" return to the setlist – Bono acknowledged its lyrical relationship with "Vertigo" by snippeting some lyrics from "Stories for Boys" at the end of "Vertigo". This snippet was a regular feature of shows on the Vertigo Tour's first leg but was done only sporadically on the second leg and never on subsequent legs. On the Innocence + Experience Tour, "Out of Control" was played second on the setlist, rotating with "The Electric Co." amongst other early U2 songs.

== Track listing ==
All lyrics are written by Bono; all music is composed by U2.

Side 1
No.	Title	Length
1.	"Out of Control"	3:58

Side 2
No.	Title	Length
1.	"Stories for Boys"	2:39
2.	"Boy/Girl"	3:21

== Personnel ==
U2

- Bono – vocals
- The Edge – guitar
- Adam Clayton – bass
- Larry Mullen Jr. – drums

Additional personnel

- U2, Chas de Whalley – production
- Robbie McGrath – remixing
- Hugo – photography

== See also ==
- U2 discography
