= Out of Control (U2 song) =

1979 song by U2

Single by U2

from the EP Three
- B-side: "Stories for Boys"; "Boy/Girl"
- Released: 26 September 1979
- Recorded: 4–5 August 1979
- Studio: Windmill Lane (Dublin)
- Genre: Post-punk
- Length: 3:52
- Label: CBS Ireland
- Composers: Bono; The Edge; Adam Clayton; Larry Mullen Jr.
- Lyricist: Bono
- Producers: U2; Chas de Whalley

U2 singles chronology
"Out of Control" (1979)	"Another Day" (1980)

"Out of Control"

Song by U2

from the album Boy
- Released: 20 October 1980
- Recorded: July–September 1980
- Studio: Windmill Lane (Dublin)
- Genre: Post-punk
- Length: 4:12
- Label: Island, CBS Ireland
- Songwriter: U2
- Producer: Steve Lillywhite

"Out of Control" is a song by Irish rock band U2. It was the A-side of the group's debut release, the EP Three. It was released in September 1979 and charted at number 19 on the Irish Singles Chart. A re-recorded version of the song was included on the band's debut album, Boy, in 1980. The song was reinterpreted in an acoustic arrangement for the band's 2023 album Songs of Surrender.

== Recording ==
Unlike the other two songs on the Three EP, "Out of Control" was a song the band had difficulty recording. During a 24-bar section nearly two-thirds of the way into the song, the instrumentation was supposed to drop out for a "simple bass-drum figure" before building back up again. Drummer Mullen repeatedly lost his timing during this section, causing his bandmates to re-enter the song improperly. De Whalley insisted that the band record take after take until they got it right, as he thought it was their best song and needed to be coherent on record. This caused friction in the studio, particularly with Mullen who Bono said should have been keeping good time, as he had been taking drumming lessons. Eventually, they completed a usable take of "Out of Control". Producer Chas de Whalley realised and stated, in retrospect, that the bass and drums were constantly out of time with each other. He said Clayton had "a slightly different sense of timing from virtually any other musician".

== Release and promotion ==
U2 manager Paul McGuinness and CBS Records representative Jackie Hayden devised a promotional strategy for the release of Three that partially hinged on radio DJ Dave Fanning. Hayden and McGuinness were successful in asking Fanning to play the record's three songs on his radio programme on RTÉ and poll listeners on which one should appear on the A-side. A different member of U2 appeared on the show each night to play a different track. As a result of the listener poll, "Out of Control" was voted to be the A-side of the record, while the runners-up, "Boy/Girl" and "Stories for Boys", became the B-side.

== Live performances ==
The earliest known performances of "Out of Control" took place in August 1979. The songs was regularly performed on the Boy Tour in 1980–1981, when it was typically the last song of the main set. "Out of Control" remained in the band's live show, rotating with "Gloria" as the concert opener on the War Tour and the first leg of the Unforgettable Fire Tour. It then appeared twice late in the Unforgettable Fire Tour before returning sporadically to the setlist on the third leg of the Joshua Tree Tour and three performances on the Lovetown Tour. "Out of Control" then had an absence from live shows of over eleven years. It was played again on 15 May 2001 on the Elevation Tour. After initial infrequent performances proved popular with fans, it became more regular in the setlist as the tour progressed. It was retained on the Vertigo Tour for special occasions; it was played a total of nine times, including instances in Toronto and Los Angeles where U2 performed it with local bands. "Out of Control" made its U2 360° Tour debut in São Paulo. It made 5 other U2 360° appearances. The song was also the closer to the main set of the band's performance at Glastonbury Festival 2011. On the Innocence + Experience Tour, "Out of Control" was played second on the setlist, rotating with "The Electric Co." amongst other early U2 songs.

== Chart ==
Chart (1979)	Peak position
Irish Singles Chart (IRMA)	19
