= A Day Without Me =

Single by U2

from the album Boy
- B-side: "Things to Make and Do"
- Released: 18 August 1980
- Recorded: 1980
- Studio: Windmill Lane (Dublin)
- Genre: Post-punk
- Length: 3:12
- Label: CBS Ireland; Island
- Songwriter: U2
- Producer: Steve Lillywhite

U2 singles chronology
| "11 O'Clock Tick Tock" (1980) | "A Day Without Me" (1980) | "I Will Follow" (1980) |

Professional ratings
Review scores
| Source | Rating |
|---|---|
| AllMusic | 2/5 |

"A Day Without Me" is a song by Irish rock band U2, and the eighth track on their debut album Boy. It was released as the album's lead single in August 1980, and was their first release to be produced by Steve Lillywhite.

== Theme ==
The song's lyrics refer to the removal of someone from their habitual social circle, and reflecting on what the world would be like without their presence.

At the time of the single's release, an Island Records press officer was notifying enquirers who were corresponding with the record label about the band that the song's lyrics were written about the death of Ian Curtis, the frontman/vocalist of the band Joy Division. However, this information was erroneous as the band performed the song in Dublin in February 1980, musically and lyrically unaltered from its release format, a few months before Curtis's death.

== Production ==
The single release was produced by Steve Lillywhite, and was the first time that he recorded with U2.

The B-side is an instrumental song called "Things to Make and Do".

== Critical reception ==
Hot Press wrote: "'A Day Without Me' doesn't have the spectral majesty of '11 O'Clock Tick Tock' but it is the closest portrayal yet of their giddy live rush."

== Cover art ==
The image on the single's cover, photographed by Susan Byrne, is of a footbridge at Booterstown railway station in South Dublin. The image echoes the Joy Division photoshoot on the Epping Walk Bridge in Hulme, Manchester, that featured in an article of New Musical Express in January 1979.

== Live performances ==
"A Day Without Me" was played live during the first half of the 1980s. On the Boy Tour, it did not have a firmly defined set list position, initially appearing in the main set before moving to the encore. It did not appear on the October Tour until November 1981, when it was paired with "I Threw a Brick Through a Window", a song from the newly released October album. The two songs were linked by a drum segue leading from the end of "I Threw a Brick Through a Window" into "A Day Without Me", and this pairing lasted until April 1985. Since then, neither song has been played live, although snippets of "A Day Without Me" have been played on rare occasions. A live performance of the song from Red Rocks Amphitheatre appears on the concert film U2 Live at Red Rocks: Under a Blood Red Sky.

"Things to Make and Do" was the only instrumental played live by U2 until the U2 360° Tour ("Return of the Stingray Guitar"), and it regularly followed "The Electric Co." on the Boy Tour. It has only been played once since the end of that tour, at an early date of the October Tour on 31 August 1981.

== Track listing ==
| No. | Title | Length |
|---|---|---|
| 1. | "A Day Without Me" | 3:12 |
| 2. | "Things to Make and Do" (instrumental) | 2:14 |
