= An Cat Dubh and Into the Heart =

"An Cat Dubh / Into the Heart"

Song by U2

from the album Boy
- Released: 20 October 1980
- Recorded: July–September 1980
- Studio: Windmill Lane (Dublin)
- Genre: Rock, post-punk
- Length: 8:14
- Label: Island
- Songwriter: U2
- Producer: Steve Lillywhite

"An Cat Dubh" (Irish: "The Black Cat") and "Into the Heart" are two songs by Irish rock band U2. They are the third and fourth tracks, respectively, on the band's debut album, Boy. The two tracks are played together as one song, both on the album and during live performances.

== Track lengths ==
On European pressings of Boy, "An Cat Dubh" runs at a track length of 4:47, and "Into the Heart" runs at 3:28. On North American pressings of the album, "An Cat Dubh" runs at 6:21, and "Into the Heart" runs at 1:58. This can be easily noted by the visible difference between the two records. However, the tracks together sound identical on both pressings, and also both have a total run time of 8:14. Early compact disc releases combined the two songs into a single track. Due to the track time differences, it is difficult to make an official determination of where one song begins and where one ends (although the band's digital box set The Complete U2 and the 2008 remastered version of Boy standardized the original European pressings' running times). Because of this, the songs are usually considered to be one track.

The 1998 single "Sweetest Thing" features a live performance of both songs from the War Tour, but only "An Cat Dubh" is listed.

== Composition ==
The title "An Cat Dubh" means "The Black Cat" in Irish, although its lyrics are in English. The song was written about a short relationship that lead vocalist Bono had with a woman while split from his girlfriend (now wife) Ali Hewson.

Gavin Friday, a very close friend of Bono, claims that the song is undoubtedly about sex. Bono agreed it is about sex and says that the song conjures the image of a cat and a bird, where the cat kills the bird and then plays with it before sleeping next to it.

"Into the Heart" focuses on the theme of childhood and maturity and the loss of innocence. The beginning of the song is instrumental until Bono starts to sing with the melody. It is always played after "An Cat Dubh".

The songs are layered with several guitar parts and a glockenspiel. Additionally, there is a sustained sound heard during the two tracks that was achieved by guitarist the Edge playing his guitar tuner and producer Steve Lillywhite adding several effects. The group took this approach because they did not have a synthesiser at the recording studio.

== Live performances ==
The songs were played at most shows on the Boy, October, and War Tours, as well as the first leg of The Unforgettable Fire Tour. Following that, neither song was played until the Vertigo Tour in 2005, where it appeared at just over half of the concerts on the first leg of the tour. It was played on one occasion on the second leg, but was subsequently dropped.

"An Cat Dubh" made an appearance in the War Tour as a snippet in "I Fall Down". "Into the Heart" was snippeted in three Elevation Tour shows, twice in "I Will Follow" and once in "Out of Control".

Live performances of "An Cat Dubh"/"Into the Heart" have been released on "Sweetest Thing", digital album Live from Boston 1981, Vertigo 2005: Live from Chicago, and the remastered DVD release of Live at Red Rocks: Under a Blood Red Sky.

In 2010, U2 manager Paul McGuinness said that "An Cat Dubh" remained one of his favourite live tracks, describing it as "symphonic", adding that it had "very big musical ambitions." He stated that the later compositions "Bad" and "One" were "the songs in line of descent from [An Cat Dubh]" because of their ability to continually grow in the live setting.

== See also ==
- List of covers of U2 songs - An Cat Dubh
