= Another Day (U2 song) =

Single by U2
- B-side: "Twilight"
- Released: 26 February 1980
- Recorded: December 1979
- Studio: Whitfield Street (London)
- Genre: Post-punk
- Length: 3:24
- Label: CBS Ireland
- Songwriter: U2
- Producer: Chas de Whalley

U2 singles chronology
"Out of Control" (1979)	"Another Day" (1980)	"11 O'Clock Tick Tock" (1980)

Professional ratings
Review scores
Source	Rating
AllMusic	2.5/5

"Another Day" is a song by Irish rock band U2. It was commercially released as a single on 26 February 1980 by CBS Ireland as a follow-up to the band's first release, the EP U2-3.

== Recording ==
"Another Day" was recorded by U2 at CBS Studios in London at No. 31-37 Whitfield Street, W1, (Note: The studio closed and the building was converted into an office block in 2005. http://www.devonshireproperty.co.uk/projects/whitfield_street.php) in December 1979 during a mini-tour of the city, which comprised their first live performances outside of Ireland. It was produced by the CBS talent scout Chas de Whalley. and engineered by Walter Samuel.

The B-side is an early version of the song "Twilight", recorded by the band with the sound engineer Dave Freely at the Eamonn Andrews Studios in Dublin in a 15-minute demo session in February 1979, which would later be re-recorded for inclusion on its first album Boy (1980).

== Release ==
The single was released on 26 February 1980 exclusively in Ireland in a small scale pressing but failed to enter the Irish Singles Chart. In 2008, the song was included in the deluxe editions of the reissue of Boy.

== Live performances ==
The song is known to have been played at six concerts (twice on 11 May 1980, for a total of 7 occasions). Its last known performance was on 27 July 1980 at Leixlip Castle, County Kildare in Ireland.

== Critical reception ==
Reviewing the single, Hot Press wrote: "'Another Day' is champing, bright and blowing and overflowing with harmonic strength. There's a lot of love on this record - repay it." Reviewing The Sense of Ireland festival performance, they wrote: "I still think there's something wrong with the internal dynamics of some of the songs; 'Another Day', for instance, definitely loses pace in the middle."

== Track listing ==
No.	Title	Length
1.	"Another Day"	3:24
2.	"Twilight"	4:35
