= October (U2 album) =

Studio album by U2
- Released: 12 October 1981
- Recorded: April and July–August 1981
- Studios: Compass Point (Nassau, The Bahamas); Windmill Lane (Dublin)
- Genre: Post-punk
- Length: 41:05
- Label: Island
- Producer: Steve Lillywhite

U2 chronology
Boy (1980)	October (1981)	War (1983)

Singles from October
- 1. "Fire" Released: 27 July 1981; 2. "Gloria" Released: 5 October 1981

October is the second studio album by Irish rock band U2. It was released on 12 October 1981 by Island Records, and was produced by Steve Lillywhite. The album was lyrically inspired by the memberships of Bono, the Edge, and Larry Mullen Jr. in a Christian group called the Shalom Fellowship, and consequently it contains spiritual and religious themes. Their involvement with Shalom Fellowship led them to question the relationship between the Christian faith and the "rock and roll" lifestyle, and threatened to break up the band.

After completing the third leg of the Boy Tour in February 1981, U2 began to write new material for October, entering the recording studio in July 1981. Just as they did for their 1980 debut, Boy, the band recorded at Windmill Lane Studios with Lillywhite producing. The recording sessions were complicated by Bono's loss of a briefcase containing in-progress lyrics for the new songs, forcing a hurried, improvisational approach to completing the album on time.

October was preceded by the lead single "Fire" in July 1981, while its second single, "Gloria", coincided with its release. The album received mixed reviews and limited radio play. In 2008, a remastered edition of October was released.

== Recording ==
In February 1981 during their Boy Tour, U2 began to write new material. ("Fire" had already been recorded at Compass Point Studios in the Bahamas while U2 took a break from the Boy Tour.) They wrote part of October during an extended sound check at First Avenue in Minneapolis. In March, on an otherwise successful American leg of the tour, the briefcase of lead vocalist Bono containing in-progress lyrics and musical ideas was lost backstage during a performance at a nightclub in Portland, Oregon. The band had limited time to write new music on tour and in July began a two-month recording session at Windmill Lane Studios largely unprepared, forcing Bono to quickly improvise lyrics. Steve Lillywhite, reprising his role as producer from U2's debut album, Boy, called the sessions "completely chaotic and mad".

Bono said of the recording process of October, "I remember the pressure it was made under, I remember writing lyrics on the microphone, and at £50 an hour, that's quite a pressure. Lillywhite was pacing up and down the studio... he coped really well. And the ironic thing about October is that there's a sort of peace about the album, even though it was recorded under that pressure. A lot of people found October hard to accept at first, I mean, I used the word 'rejoice' precisely because I knew people have a mental block against it. It's a powerful word, it's lovely to say. It's implying more than 'get up and dance, baby.' I think October goes into areas that most rock 'n' roll bands ignore. When I listen to the album, something like 'Tomorrow,' it actually moves me." The briefcase was eventually recovered in October 2004, and Bono greeted its return as "an act of grace". Whereas Lillywhite recorded Larry Mullen Jr.'s drums in the stairway of the reception area of Windmill Lane Studios for Boy, the producer moved the recording of the drums into the studio for October; Lillywhite later called it "one of the things that didn't work so well".

=== Near breakup ===
Dating back to the late 1970s, Bono, guitarist the Edge, and Mullen were involved with a Charismatic Christian group in Dublin called the "Shalom Fellowship" that led them to question the relationship between their religious faith and the lifestyle of a rock band. During the Boy Tour, the trio did not drink or smoke, rarely socialised with their crew members, and regularly read the Bible and prayed together on the tour bus. Bassist Adam Clayton was not part of Shalom and instead "rarely passed on an opportunity to go wild", according to biographer John Jobling. Clayton felt alienated from his bandmates, associating more closely with their manager Paul McGuinness, and he was concerned that U2 were becoming a Christian rock band. As Shalom continued, the organisation became more intense and pressured its members to attend all of their prayer meetings. Mullen frequently argued with his father about his involvement, straining their relationship.

Mullen said that Shalom was pressuring the band to give up music and "do something more spiritually edifying". He elaborated: "It was a bit like the bigger the commitment you made, the closer you were to heaven. It was a really screwed-up view of the world and nothing to do with what I now understand a Christian faith to be." According to the Edge, the trio of U2 members were "reconciling two things that seemed for [them] at that moment to be mutually exclusive". They also prioritised Shalom meetings over the recording sessions for October. Kevin Moloney, a sound engineer at Windmill Lane Studios, said, "They used to have those Christian meetings in the studio... and we'd be told to shag off." According to Jobling, one day Bono stormed into the control room of the studio where Lillywhite and the crew were working and shouted, "the Second Coming is going to happen and it's going to happen within the next ten years!", before leaving; Lillywhite responded, "That idiot thinks he is the Second Coming!"

Mullen decided to leave Shalom, saying: "I got out before anybody else. I'd just had enough, it was bullshit. It was like joining the Moonies." The Edge informed Bono privately that he wanted to leave U2, believing that he could not serve both God and man. Bono responded that he was not interested in being in a band without the Edge and decided he wanted to leave as well. The two informed the rest of the group of their decision, much to the surprise of McGuinness, Lillywhite, and Clayton. In a band meeting, Clayton said that McGuinness questioned if leaving U2 was really what they wanted and if they would be more effective returning to their normal lives than they would being in a "great rock 'n' roll band". In response to Bono and the Edge telling him they intended to do God's work and that the impending October Tour would need to be cancelled, McGuinness replied, "if God had something to say about this tour he should have raised his hand a little earlier because, in the meantime we've booked a big crew and made commitments to people and, in my view, you're obliged to follow through on them." Ultimately, Bono and the Edge decided to continue with U2. The Edge considered the contradictions he was feeling to be ones he could live with, saying, "it was completely bogus to suggest that you couldn't have a legitimate spiritual life and be in the rock 'n' roll business". He clarified that he never officially left U2 but rather put his commitments to them on hold for a two-week period while reassessing his future. He and Bono later withdrew from Shalom.

== Composition ==
"Influences, primarily Joy Division, Invisible Girls. A great example of how you can write a song and not know what you're writing about. A song called 'Tomorrow' is a detailed account of my mother's funeral. But I had no idea when I was writing it."

— Bono

The record placed an emphasis on religion and spirituality, particularly in the songs "Gloria" (featuring a Latin chorus of "Gloria, in te domine"), "With a Shout (Jerusalem)", and "Tomorrow". About the album, Bono declared in 2005: "Can you imagine your second album—the difficult second album—it's about God?"

The songs mainly refine U2's formula of riff-rockers with songs such as "Gloria" and "Rejoice", but the band also expanded its musical palette in a few ways. In particular, guitarist The Edge incorporates piano in songs such as "I Fall Down", "Stranger in a Strange Land", "Scarlet", and "October". "Tomorrow", a lament to Bono's mother, who died when he was young, features Uilleann pipes played by Vinnie Kilduff later of In Tua Nua. "I Threw a Brick Through a Window" was one of the band's first songs to highlight drummer Larry Mullen, Jr., while "Gloria" highlights bassist Adam Clayton as it features three styles of playing in one song (using a pick for the most part, playing with fingers during the slide guitar by The Edge, then a "slap & pop" solo towards the end).

"Is That All?" borrows the riff from "Cry", an older song the band has used as an introduction to "The Electric Co." live.

== Packaging and title ==
Bono conceived the album title October, before the song of the same name was written. He called it "an ominous album title" and said it reflected a disillusionment he was feeling at the time: "It was the idea that we were born in the Sixties, a time when materialism was in full bloom. We had fridges and cars, we sent people to the moon and everybody thought how great mankind was. But the Eighties was a colder time, materialism without any idealism, the sun without any heat, winter. It was after the fall, after the harvest... Here I am, aged 22, with a head full of gothic dread, looking around at a world where there's millions of unemployed or hungry people, and all we've used the technology we've been blessed with is to build bigger bombs so no one can challenge our empty ideas. Christendom is telling us that God is dead, but I'm thinking Christendom is dead and our little combo has been hired to play at the funeral."

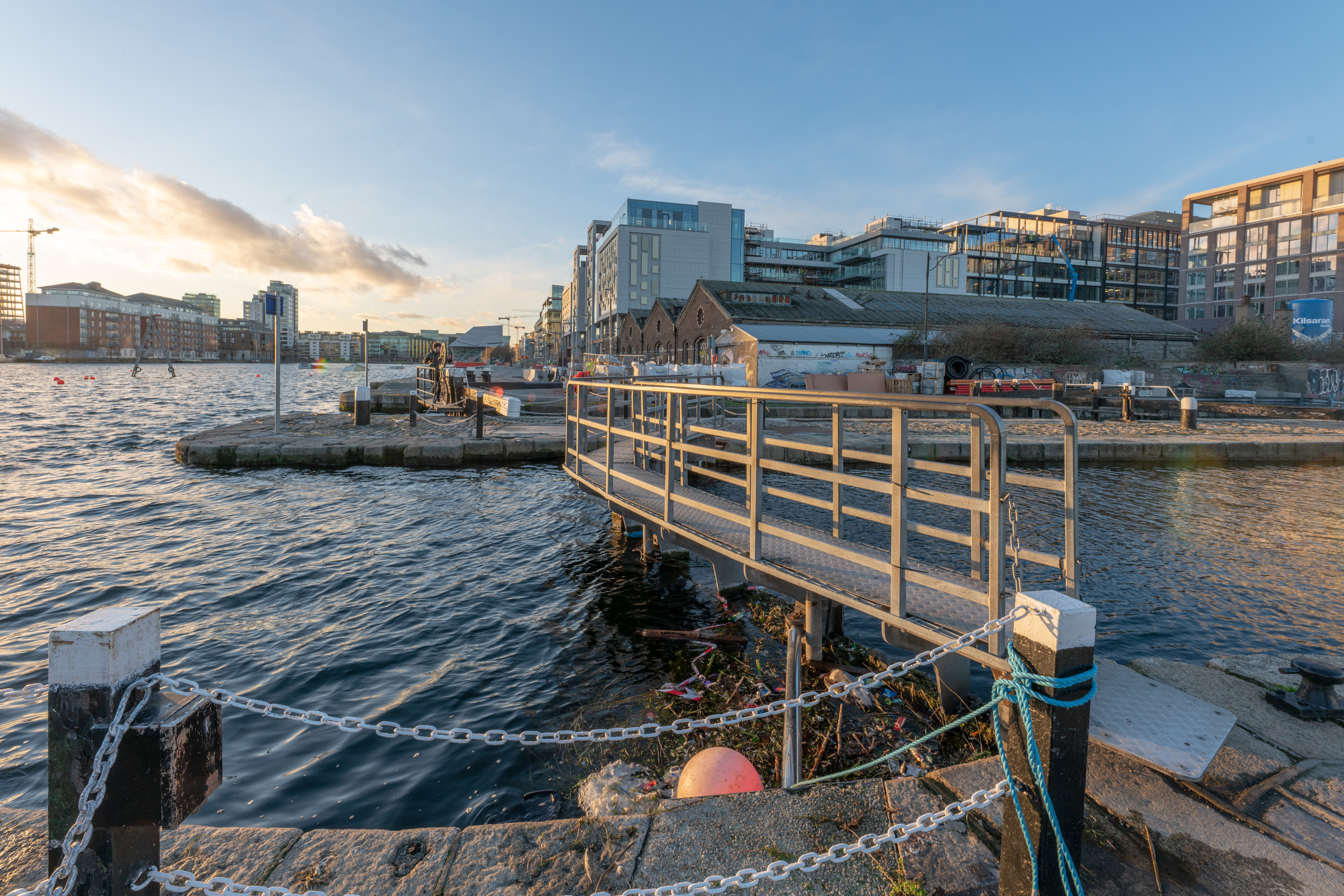
A lock at the Grand Canal Dock in Dublin, where the cover image was photographed

The cover photograph of the four band members was shot by Ian Finlay at the Grand Canal Dock near Hanover Quay in Dublin, not far from Windmill Lane Studios. The photoshoot was done spontaneously with the band's cover designer Steve Averill on an overcast day during the recording sessions, without any prior planning or discussion. The idea for the location came from Bono, who walked through the area each morning during the recording sessions and felt the industrial aesthetic of the area was special. He wanted the album to have a 1960s-style visual presentation, with a thick white border around the cover image and the track listing on the front; Averill believed Bono was directly inspired by the artwork of The Freewheelin' Bob Dylan. Visually, Averill took inspiration from Russia's October Revolution, with one image from the album's photoshoot of the band in a coalyard suggesting to him the angular work of Russian Revolutionary posters. Averill wanted the typeface to suggest Russian typography but he faced limited means of researching typefaces and ultimately was unhappy with his choice. His original idea for the vinyl album sleeve was to have a gatefold, with a shot of the band in front of a dock on the front cover, and a similar shot from a further vantage point – featuring a local man named George and his dog Skipper – on the back cover. When presented with the idea, Island Records was dismissive of it.

For the final cover, a widescreen photo was selected, wrapping across the front and back; Averill believed that their cinematic, widescreen view of Dublin did not come across as intended when the image was folded in half. Recognising that the band's first album had sold only modestly, Island relented to requests from their team to invest more in the packaging and allowed them to have colour photographs on the interior packaging. Still, the label was displeased with the final cover after it was submitted and tried to dissuade the group from proceeding with it. Island sent a representative from their art department in London to talk to the band and advocate for the label to handle album sleeves in house. U2 and McGuinness refused, pointing out that their contract allowed them to choose the final artwork. The Edge said the group were trying to prevent an artistic takeover from the label. Years later, the band members expressed regret over October's cover. Bono faulted himself, while Clayton said, "we were so much up our own arses that we didn't have the sense to listen to what was being said". The Edge said that while Island's representative from the art department was "absolutely right and [U2] would have been much better off listening to him", he wondered if the band's decision to exert artistic control was the right one in the long term. The cover artwork was adapted by Island without Averill's involvement for October's release on other formats, such as the cassette tape.

== Release ==
October was released on 12 October 1981. Both of the album's two singles preceded the album's release; "Fire" and "Gloria" were released as singles in July and October 1981, respectively.

October was the start of U2's vision of the music video as an integral part of the band's creative work, as it was released during a time that MTV was first becoming as popular as radio. The video for "Gloria" was directed by Meiert Avis and shot in the Canal Basin in Dublin.

In 2008, a remastered edition of the album was released, featuring remastered tracks, along with B-sides and rarities. Three different formats of the remaster were made available.

== Critical reception ==
Professional ratings
Review scores
Source	Rating
The Houston Chronicle	5/5 stars
Record Mirror	3/5 stars
Rolling Stone	3/5 stars
Smash Hits	9/10
Sounds	5/5 stars
Windsor Star	A

Retrospective professional ratings
Review scores
Source	Rating
AllMusic	3/5 stars
The Austin Chronicle	3/5 stars
The A.V. Club	B+
Chicago Tribune	2.5/4 stars
Christgau's Record Guide	B−
Entertainment Weekly	B
Pitchfork	7.1/10
The Rolling Stone Album Guide	3/5 stars

Upon its release, October received more mixed reviews than its predecessor. Dave McCullough of Sounds praised the album and said: "A kind of zenith pop then, no half measures. It all breathes fire, recovering too from the pair of standouts appearing at the start of each side – 'Gloria' being possibly Their Finest Moment and 'Tomorrow', low and muted, gently oozing emotion". McCullough concluded, "This October will last forever". Adam Sweeting of Melody Maker also wrote a favourable review, saying: "Their whole musical sensibility is shaped by a strong emotional bond to their homeland and its traditions. It gives them a completely different frame of reference from most groups, and on 'October' it's given them the strength to assimilate a barrage of disorientation and to turn that into a cohesive body of music." Neil McCormick of Hot Press judged October to be "a musical and spiritual growth" for U2, calling it "an LP of exciting, emotional, spiritually inclined rock: the most uplifting rock LP of the year, a modern dance that studies no trends, relies on no false aura of cool". Bill Flanagan of The Boston Globe called the album "brilliant", praising it for being "intensely spiritual without being remotely preachy or containing any of the embarrassing lunk-headedness of much born-again rock; an album that combines beauty and melancholy without ever being pathetic". Trevor Dann of The Sunday Telegraph praised October for being greater than the sum of its individual songs, calling it "a musical journey through an extraordinary range of styles and textures". Dann concluded, "In the bygone age of guitar heroes, The Edge... alone would have been enough to ensure U2 legendary status."

In contrast, NME published a negative review, in which reviewer Barney Hoskyns noted the "excessive plaintiveness of Bono's voice and the forced power of U2's sound". He concluded: "Obviously rock doesn't expire just because groups run out of ways to change it... U2, I guess, will continue to 'move' in live performance, but they will only move on the lightest surface. Their music does 'soar'... But then 'God' knows, there are other religions". Jon Pareles of Rolling Stone praised the Edge for his powerful guitar playing, "drenched in echo and glory", but said Bono's vocals were negatively impacted by him taking himself too seriously and that his lyrics were silly and clichéd. Pareles acknowledged the band's attempts to vary their sound, but said "none of the strategies works as well yet as their basic power-trio dynamics". J. D. Considine said in Musician that like its predecessor, the album was a joy to hear but "Where Boy waxed poetic on the boisterous mythologies of youth, October tends to wallow in the poetic excesses of adolescence." He judged that "U2 is in the rather dangerous position of having a lot to listeners and nothing to say" and concluded, "What a shame if a band so musically eloquent turned out to be lyric imbeciles." Mark Cooper of Record Mirror said that the album "develops the autumnal side of U2 but it fails to vary or transform their already characteristic sound". Richard Cromelin of the Los Angeles Times believed the band had not progressed themselves since Boy and that Lillywhite erred by treating Bono's vocals as "another floating element" instead of an anchor, saying: "Lillywhite is guilty in general of over-producing; U2's lavish, booming music soon begins to sound simply evasive, and the whole thing begins to stall a bit by the middle of Side 2." Robin Denselow of The Guardian called "Tomorrow" the most surprising track and said songs like "Gloria" and "Stranger in a Strange Land" were "both atmospheric and powerful, though might be improved if U2 developed even more distinctive melodies to go with their distinctive style".

In a retrospective review, Stephen Thomas Erlewine of AllMusic said the band "tries too hard to move forward" on October, with Bono straining to make big statements and the music sounding "too pompous". Erlewine did highlight certain "thoroughly impressive" songs that "marry the message, melody, and sound together".

== October Tour ==
U2 embarked on the October Tour from 1981 to 1982. "Gloria" was their first song to have its music video played on MTV, generating excitement for the band in markets where the television channel was available. During the tour, they met the Dutch photographer Anton Corbijn, who became their principal photographer and has had a major influence on their public image. In March 1982, the band played 14 dates as the opening act for the J. Geils Band. U2 were disappointed by their lack of progress by the end of the tour. Having run out of money and feeling unsupported by their record label, the group committed to improving; Clayton recalled that "there was a firm resolve to come out of the box fighting with the next record".

== Track listing ==
All tracks are written by U2.

Side one
No.	Title	Length
1.	"Gloria"	4:14
2.	"I Fall Down"	3:39
3.	"I Threw a Brick Through a Window"	4:54
4.	"Rejoice"	3:37
5.	"Fire"	3:51

Side two
No.	Title	Length
1.	"Tomorrow"	4:39
2.	"October"	2:21
3.	"With a Shout (Jerusalem)"	4:02
4.	"Stranger in a Strange Land"	3:56
5.	"Scarlet"	2:53
6.	"Is That All?"	2:59
Total length:		41:05

=== 2008 remastered edition ===
On 9 April 2008, U2.com confirmed that October, along with the other two of the band's first three albums, Boy and War would be re-released as newly remastered versions. The remastered album was released on 21 July 2008 in the UK, with the U.S. version following it the next day. The cover artwork for the remastered version was changed to crop the whitespace and track names. The remaster of October was released in three different formats:

1. Standard format: A single CD with remastered audio and restored packaging. Includes a 16-page booklet featuring previously unseen photos, full lyrics and new liner notes by Neil McCormick. The 11 tracks match the previous release of the album.
2. Deluxe format: A standard CD (as above) and a bonus CD. The bonus CD includes five live tracks from Hammersmith Palais, three live tracks from the BBC, the "A Celebration"/"Trash, Trampoline and the Party Girl" single released after October, the two B-sides from the album's singles, four additional live tracks from the Boston Paradise show and two other rarities. Also includes a 32-page booklet with previously unseen photos, full lyrics, new liner notes by Neil McCormick, and explanatory notes on the bonus material by The Edge.
3. Vinyl format: A single-album remastered version on 180-gram vinyl with restored packaging.

=== Bonus CD ===
All tracks are written by U2.

No.	Title	Original broadcast/release	Length
1.	"Gloria" (Live at Hammersmith Palais, London on 6 December 1982)	BBC Radio 1 (8 January 1983)	4:43
2.	"I Fall Down" (Live at Hammersmith Palais, London on 6 December 1982)	BBC Radio 1 (8 January 1983)	3:02
3.	"I Threw a Brick Through a Window" (Live at Hammersmith Palais, London on 6 December 1982)	BBC Radio 1 (8 January 1983)	3:52
4.	"Fire" (Live at Hammersmith Palais, London on 6 December 1982)	BBC Radio 1 (8 January 1983)	3:32
5.	"October" (Live at Hammersmith Palais, London on 6 December 1982)	BBC Radio 1 (8 January 1983)	2:22
6.	"With a Shout" (BBC session on 3 September 1981)	BBC Radio 1 (broadcast 8 September 1981)	3:34
7.	"Scarlet" (BBC session on 3 September 1981)	BBC Radio 1 (broadcast 8 September 1981)	2:46
8.	"I Threw a Brick Through a Window" (BBC session on 3 September 1981)	BBC Radio 1 (broadcast 8 September 1981)	4:18
9.	"A Celebration"	"A Celebration" single	2:57
10.	"J. Swallo"	"Fire" single	2:20
11.	"Trash, Trampoline and the Party Girl"	"A Celebration" single	2:36
12.	"I Will Follow" (Live at The Paradise, Boston on 6 March 1981)	"Gloria" single	3:44
13.	"The Ocean" (Live at The Paradise, Boston on 6 March 1981)	"Fire" single	2:15
14.	"The Cry / The Electric Co." (Live at The Paradise, Boston on 6 March 1981)	"Fire" single (without "Send in the clowns")	4:28
15.	"11 O'Clock Tick Tock" (Live at The Paradise, Boston on 6 March 1981)	"Fire" single	4:57
16.	"I Will Follow" (Live from Hattem on 14 May 1982)	"I Will Follow" (Live) single	3:52
17.	"Tomorrow" (Common Ground remix)	Common Ground compilation album	4:36
Total length:			59:55

== Personnel ==
Personnel taken from October liner notes.

U2

- Bono – vocals
- The Edge – guitar, piano, vocals
- Adam Clayton – bass
- Larry Mullen Jr. – drums

Additional musician

- Vinnie Kilduff – Uileann pipes, bodhrán

Technical

- Steve Lillywhite – producer
- Paul Thomas – engineer
- Kevin Moloney – assistant engineer
- Rapid Exteriors – sleeve layout
- Ian Finley – photography
- Ian Cooper – mastering

== Charts ==
Chart	Peak position
Australia (Kent Music Report)	34
Belgian Albums (Ultratop Flanders)	56
Belgian Albums (Ultratop Wallonia)	47
Dutch Albums (Album Top 100)	31
German Albums (Offizielle Top 100)	96
Irish Albums (IRMA)	17
Italian Albums (FIMI)	35
New Zealand Albums (RMNZ)	6
Spanish Albums (Promusicae)	41
Swedish Albums (Sverigetopplistan)	40
UK Albums (OCC)	11
US Billboard Top LPs & Tape	104

== Certifications ==
Region	Certification	Certified units/sales
Australia (ARIA)	Gold	35,000^{‡}
France (SNEP)	Gold	100,000^{*}
New Zealand (RMNZ)	Gold	7,500^{^}
United Kingdom (BPI)	Platinum	300,000^{^}
United States (RIAA)	Platinum	1,000,000^{^}
^{*} Sales figures based on certification alone.^{^} Shipments figures based on certification alone.^{‡} Sales+streaming figures based on certification alone.

== See also ==
- U2 discography
