= War Tour =

1982–83 concert tour by U2

- Tour by U2
- Promotional poster
- Location: Europe; North America; Asia
- Associated album: War
- Start date: 1 December 1982
- End date: 30 November 1983
- Legs: 2 to 5, depending upon definition
- No. of shows: up to 110, depending upon definition

U2 concert chronology
- October Tour (1981–1982); War Tour (1982–1983); The Unforgettable Fire Tour (1984–1985)

The War Tour was the third concert tour by the Irish rock band U2, which took place in 1982 and 1983 in support of the group's third album War. The tour took place in Western Europe, the United States, Canada and Japan, with new material from War taking an increasing role as the tour progressed. Venues were mostly halls, but some arenas were introduced later on. U2's performances were very well received both critically and commercially, especially in the United States where U2 broke through to become a major act. Scenes of lead singer Bono waving a white flag during the song "Sunday Bloody Sunday" became an emblematic image of this phase of U2's career. It was their first tour as full-time headlining act and their first to be profitable.

The live album Under a Blood Red Sky and the concert film U2 Live at Red Rocks: Under a Blood Red Sky both originated from performances on the tour. The latter matched U2's concert fervour with the spectacular natural setting of the Red Rocks Amphitheatre in the rain to produce a memorable document of the War Tour and to further increase the group's popularity; U2's filming of the Red Rocks show was later selected by Rolling Stone magazine as one of the "50 Moments that Changed the History of Rock and Roll".

== Itinerary ==
After War had been recorded, but three months before it was released, U2 began playing the Pre-War Tour: 20 shows, and a television appearance, in halls in Western Europe, commencing on 1 December 1982 in Glasgow and finishing in the band's home town, Dublin, on 24 December. These shows generally featured only three songs from the upcoming album, "Sunday Bloody Sunday", "New Year's Day", and "Surrender". The 20 December performance in Belfast's Maysfield Leisure Centre represented the first airing of "Sunday Bloody Sunday" in Northern Ireland; lead singer Bono told the crowd, "We're going to do a song for you now. If you don't like it, we'll never play it again. It's called 'Sunday Bloody Sunday'." The reception was positive, and the song stayed in. Subsequent introductions would explicitly clarify the song's purpose: "This song is not a rebel song, this song is 'Sunday Bloody Sunday'!"

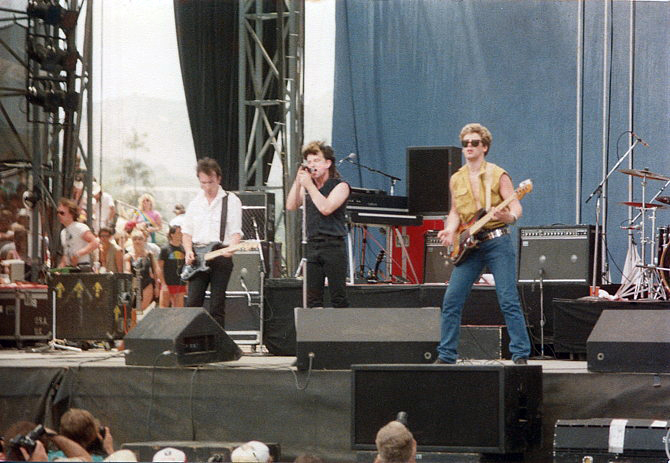
U2 performing at the US Festival in May 1983

On 26 February 1983 at Caird Hall in Dundee, Scotland, the War Tour proper began, with the album's release coming two days later. The band played 29 shows and three television appearances in Scotland, England, and Wales, ending on 3 April with a single continental show at the Printemps de Bourges in Bourges, France. Three or four additional songs from War were added to these set lists, including "Two Hearts Beat As One", and the band started their 1980's practice of ending shows with the War song "40".

The next leg went to North America for 48 shows and two radio appearances, beginning on 23 April in Chapel Hill, North Carolina and ending on 26 June at the Hudson River Park Pier 84 facility in New York City. The War Tour was U2's first as a full-time headlining act. Most of the venues were colleges and smaller auditoriums, but they played a few arena shows, such as at the Centrum in Worcester, Massachusetts and at the Los Angeles Sports Arena. Many of the shows featured the Welsh band The Alarm as the opening act.

During this tour, they appeared before one of the largest audiences in US music history: on Memorial Day at the US Festival in San Bernardino, California, they appeared at noontime on the third day of the festival before a crowd of over 125,000. The festival was broadcast live on MTV. The performance climaxed in a grand finale where Bono scaled the proscenium of the US festival's huge stage while singing the song "The Electric Co.", ending up about 100 feet above the ground.

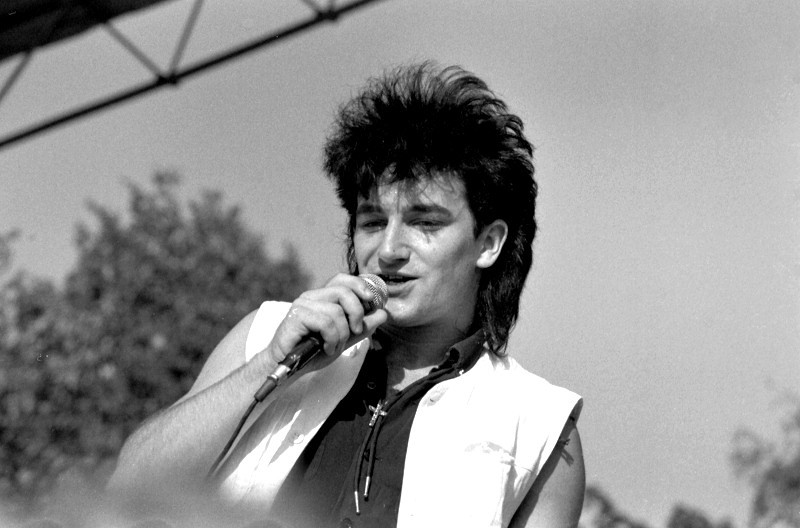
Bono singing during a U2 performance at the Kalvøya Festival in Oslo, near the end of the War Tour on 21 August 1983

A week later, their 5 June 1983 performance at Red Rocks Amphitheatre (an outdoor venue near Morrison, Colorado in the foothills of the Rocky Mountains that many travelling musicians consider the most spectacular outdoor venue in the United States) was recorded for what turned out to be a live album entitled Under a Blood Red Sky and concert film entitled Live at Red Rocks: Under a Blood Red Sky. A steady rain and the surreal, torch-lit natural beauty of the surroundings combined to present U2's performance in the most dramatic of contexts. Frequently shown on MTV, the video helped to further expand the band's American audience and rewarded the large financial risk the show had represented. The album used performances culled from the Red Rocks show as well as a 6 May show in Boston's Orpheum Theatre and a 20 August show in St. Goarshausen, West Germany at the Lorelei Amphitheatre. The Orpheum Theatre performance was also recorded and broadcast on the King Biscuit Flower Hour syndicated radio program.

U2 then played at 5 outdoor summer festivals in Western Europe in July and August.

After a nearly three-month interlude, U2 played a show in Honolulu, Hawaii, before their first tour of Japan for six shows, with the tour ending on 30 November 1983 at the Nakano Sun Plaza in Tokyo. While in Japan, U2 made two television appearances, one of which featured a performance of "New Year's Day" in which Edge performed almost entirely on piano due to a guitar failure.

== Shows and reception ==
In both UK and US publicity for the tour, the group emphasised that it opposed "wallpaper music" from artists who spent more time on their hairdos than anything else. In the US, advertisements for the tour read "U2 Declare War" and talked about "The War on Boring Music", especially in the context of breaking up conservative radio formats. National identification also played a role; Bono said to US audiences variants of: "We're not just another English fashion band passing through. We're an Irish band and we're here to stay."

War's music, its music videos, and the War Tour separated U2 from the mass of new wave or college rock acts and into mainstream rock visibility. Shows were typically 90 minutes long. Bono was emotional and very theatrical during shows; during songs he would climb lighting rigs, plunge into the audience, or walk out onto side balconies. As the tour progressed, band members and others became concerned that Bono's antics – while making for good press copy and having an electric effect on some fans – were detracting from the music and might end in a disaster (an assessment Bono later agreed with). "New Year's Day" became a hit single, and in concert performances were full of vitality, with The Edge rapidly switching back and forth between piano and electric guitar. Older songs such as "Gloria" and "11 O'Clock Tick Tock" were kept in the set list. "40"'s show-closing, thoughtful presence – wherein The Edge and bassist Adam Clayton swapped instruments, then three band members left one by one leaving only drummer Larry Mullen, Jr. – grew into an audience participation ritual that would continue even after the band had left the stage. At one show at Dublin's Phoenix Park Racecourse, the fans' singing of the refrain How long, to sing this song from the song went on for 15 minutes after the concert's end.

Initial British critical reaction to the first leg of the War Tour was favourable but with some reservations. The group was already well known there, and while War debuted at the top of the UK albums chart, it had encountered some early backlash, with NME saying "the great personal fury" of U2's early work had been replaced by "literal but sincere sloganeering". Sounds magazine said a Birmingham show had pacing and thematic problems due to "newer numbers clumsily breaking the mood that had earlier been created" but praised many other elements of the show, saying that "their skill at breaking down barriers between band and audience has never been better." Some poor notices for the album itself from the British pop weeklies upset Bono during the tour, and one from Sounds bothered him so much that he insulted the reviewer by name during a show in Portsmouth.

U2's exciting concerts earned critical praise during the American leg, where the band had not been as well-known previously. Both American audiences and American critics were more open than the British to the group's upfront emotional statements and theatricality. The New York Times' John Rockwell wrote that: "This is a great live band. Bono is a riveting public personality, leaping and crawling all over the stage and above it into the scaffolding." The Boston Globe wrote that the group's performance "reached a rare, wondrous zone – where rock 'n' roll transcended the ordinary and took the audience on a lift that was equal parts spiritual and sensual." It said that Bono's vocals "sound like pleas and prayers, the lyrics failure and hope" and described The Edge's guitar playing as embodying "clear, ringing lines that were both atmospheric and jarring." The Oregonian wrote that it was "the best concert of 1983 so far: solid music played rhythmically and well, a positive stage attitude that recognised audience input, excellent sound and lights." The Village Voice wrote that U2 in concert evoked an "undeniable righteousness" about which "U2 was thrilled [and] their audience was thrilled". Journalist Rick Miller wrote of the opening US show in Chapel Hill, "There are no words for the warmth of the thrill that U2 gave the crowd. I surrendered and I know I'm not alone." Contemporary Christian Music magazine said that the show avoided typical juvenile stage patter clichés and that from a Christian perspective, "It is true that U2 doesn't preach, but that does not mean a message is not communicated."

Tickets were in demand in the US, spurred by word-of-mouth and the breakthrough of "New Year's Day" as a hit single there. Many of the War Tour shows sold out on the American leg. The group began booking bigger venues on the tour as a result. The tour helped War stay in or near the US albums chart Top 20 for the duration of that leg, which represented by far their best commercial performance so far in the United States. At the same time, the band had to deal with larger-scale success for the first time, with more of a distance between themselves and their audience and with the audience itself changing in nature. The group was being mobbed by fans at some locations and Bono became a sex symbol to female fans.

The tour grossed about $2 million overall and was their first venture on the road that was profitable.

== Themes and legacy ==
The War Tour was the first U2 tour on which the lighting and stage design was done by Willie Williams, who would continue to perform that role in all of U2's subsequent tours. While originally hired for just lighting, Williams quickly became involved in all aspects of the group's visual presentation. Starting with the Pre-War Tour, the minimalist stage design featured a red carpet-covered riser on which the drums and keyboards stood. Three large white flags were placed at the back of the stage, representing the notion of "surrender"; electric fans set the flags flying at designated moments in the show. Stage fog was also used in places. One newspaper review said that "Lighting was starkly beautiful for this concert, in tune with the occasional ominous tone of some of the songs."

During "Sunday Bloody Sunday", Bono would march waving a white flag around to illustrate his anti-war and anti-nationalist stances and spur audiences to shout, "No more! No war!" The white flags were also sometimes handed off the stage, where they would be passed around amongst the audience. Bono said that his "limited voice" compelled him to search for other ways to express a song's meaning, and here this was the "idea of a flag drained of all colour, the idea of surrender." This became the focal image of the tour, with Rolling Stone saying of the Red Rocks performance, "The sight of Bono singing the anti-violence anthem 'Sunday Bloody Sunday' while waving a white flag through crimson mist (created by a combination of wet weather, hot lights and the illumination of those crags) became the defining image of U2's warrior-rock spirit." So strong was the image that the group became somewhat ambivalent about it; years later, bassist Adam Clayton would say, "If you had to reduce U2 down to the waving of the white flag, which is a moment from the War Tour, that would be the worst thing. At the time, I think it was in the spirit of the performance. But we weren't very ironic people back then. We were pretty serious people, and we didn't see that we could have been a little more subtle about things like that. But hey, as mistakes go, that's probably not a bad one."

The move upward from clubs to halls to arenas that the War Tour spanned did not faze the group. This had been their plan, and Bono said, "If we stay in small clubs, we'll develop small minds, and then we'll start making small music." And early on, Bono had told Williams that someday the group would do "Pink Floyd-size shows." But the medium-sized venues of the War Tour were enough at the time; two decades later, the band's Red Rocks performance captured on Live at Red Rocks: Under a Blood Red Sky was included on Rolling Stone's list of the "50 Moments that Changed the History of Rock and Roll".

== Tour dates ==
Date	City	Country	Venue
Leg 1: Europe (Pre-War Tour)
1 December 1982	Glasgow	Scotland	Tiffany's
2 December 1982	Manchester	England	Apollo
3 December 1982	Leicester	England	De Montfort Hall
4 December 1982	Birmingham	England	Birmingham Odeon
5 December 1982	London	England	Lyceum Ballroom
6 December 1982	London	England	Hammersmith Palais
8 December 1982	Utrecht	Netherlands	Muziekcentrum Vredenburg
9 December 1982	Groningen	Netherlands	Martinihal
10 December 1982	Mechelen	Belgium	Volksbelang
11 December 1982	Deinze	Belgium	Brielport
12 December 1982	Genk	Belgium	Limburghal
14 December 1982	Copenhagen	Denmark	Folketeatret
15 December 1982	Stockholm	Sweden	Konserthuset
16 December 1982	Oslo	Norway	unknown
18 December 1982	Cork	Ireland	City Hall
19 December 1982	Galway	Ireland	Leisureland
20 December 1982	Belfast	Northern Ireland	Maysfield Leisure Centre
22 December 1982	Dublin	Ireland	SFX
23 December 1982	Dublin	Ireland	SFX
24 December 1982	Dublin	Ireland	SFX
Leg 2: Europe
26 February 1983	Dundee	Scotland	Caird Hall
27 February 1983	Aberdeen	Scotland	Capitol Theatre
28 February 1983	Edinburgh	Scotland	Edinburgh Playhouse
1 March 1983	Newcastle upon Tyne	England	City Hall
2 March 1983	Lancaster	England	Lancaster University
3 March 1983	Liverpool	England	Royal Court Theatre
4 March 1983	Hanley	England	Victoria Hall
6 March 1983	Portsmouth	England	Guildhall
7 March 1983	Bristol	England	Colston Hall
8 March 1983	Exeter	England	Exeter University
9 March 1983	Poole	England	Arts Centre
10 March 1983	Birmingham	England	Birmingham Odeon
11 March 1983	Cardiff	Wales	St David's Hall
13 March 1983	Brighton	England	Top Rank
14 March 1983	London	England	Hammersmith Odeon
15 March 1983	Ipswich	England	Gaumont Theatre
17 March 1983	Sheffield	England	City Hall
18 March 1983	Leeds	England	Leeds University
19 March 1983	Manchester	England	Apollo
20 March 1983	Derby	England	Assembly Rooms
21 March 1983	London	England	Hammersmith Odeon
22 March 1983	London	England	Hammersmith Palais
24 March 1983	Glasgow	Scotland	Tiffany's
25 March 1983	Liverpool	England	Royal Court Theatre
26 March 1983	Newcastle upon Tyne	England	City Hall
27 March 1983	Birmingham	England	Odeon
28 March 1983	Nottingham	England	Royal Centre
29 March 1983	London	England	Hammersmith Palais
3 April 1983	Bourges	France	Festival De Printemps
Leg 3: North America
23 April 1983	Chapel Hill	United States	Kenan Memorial Stadium
24 April 1983	Norfolk	United States	Chrysler Hall
25 April 1983	College Park	United States	Ritchie Coliseum
27 April 1983	Auburn	United States	Cayuga County Community College Gym
28 April 1983	Rochester	United States	Rochester Institute of Technology Ice Rink
29 April 1983	Delhi	United States	State University of New York at Delhi
30 April 1983	Providence	United States	Marvel Gymnasium
1 May 1983	Stony Brook	United States	Stony Brook University
3 May 1983	Pittsburgh	United States	Fulton Theater
5 May 1983	Boston	United States	Orpheum Theatre
6 May 1983	Boston	United States	Orpheum Theatre
7 May 1983	Albany	United States	State University of New York
8 May 1983	Hartford	United States	Trinity College
10 May 1983	New Haven	United States	Woolsey Hall
11 May 1983	New York City	United States	Palladium
12 May 1983	Passaic	United States	Capitol Theatre
13 May 1983	Upper Darby	United States	Tower Theater
14 May 1983	Upper Darby	United States	Tower Theater
16 May 1983	Buffalo	United States	Shea's Buffalo
17 May 1983	Toronto	Canada	Massey Hall
19 May 1983	Cleveland	United States	Public Auditorium
20 May 1983	Detroit	United States	Grand Circus Theater
21 May 1983	Chicago	United States	Aragon Ballroom
22 May 1983	Minneapolis	United States	Northrop Auditorium
25 May 1983	Vancouver	Canada	Queen Elizabeth Theatre
26 May 1983	Seattle	United States	Paramount Theatre
27 May 1983	Portland	United States	Paramount Theatre
30 May 1983	Devore	United States	Glen Helen Regional Park (US Festival)
1 June 1983	San Francisco	United States	Civic Auditorium
3 June 1983	Salt Lake City	United States	Salt Palace
5 June 1983	Morrison	United States	Red Rocks Amphitheatre
6 June 1983	Boulder	United States	Coors Events Center
7 June 1983	Wichita	United States	Cotillion Ballroom
8 June 1983	Kansas City	United States	Memorial Hall
9 June 1983	Tulsa	United States	Brady Theater
10 June 1983	Norman	United States	Lloyd Noble Center
11 June 1983	Austin	United States	The Meadows
13 June 1983	Dallas	United States	Bronco Bowl
14 June 1983	Houston	United States	Houston Music Hall
17 June 1983	Los Angeles	United States	Sports Arena
21 June 1983	Orlando	United States	Jai Alai Fronton Hall
22 June 1983	Tampa	United States	Curtis Hixon Hall
23 June 1983	Miami	United States	Sunrise Musical Theater
24 June 1983	Jacksonville	United States	Civic Auditorium
25 June 1983	Atlanta	United States	Atlanta Civic Center
27 June 1983	New Haven	United States	New Haven Coliseum
28 June 1983	Worcester	United States	The Centrum
29 June 1983	New York City	United States	Pier 84
Leg 4: Europe
2 July 1983	Torhout	Belgium	Torhout Festival
3 July 1983	Werchter	Belgium	Werchter Festival
14 August 1983	Dublin	Ireland	Phoenix Park Racecourse
20 August 1983	St. Goarshausen	West Germany	Lorelei Amphitheatre
21 August 1983	Oslo	Norway	Kalvøya Festival
Leg 5: Pacific
16 November 1983	Honolulu	United States	Neal S. Blaisdell Center
22 November 1983	Osaka	Japan	Festival Hall
23 November 1983	Seto	Japan	Seto-shi Bunka Centre
26 November 1983	Tokyo	Japan	Shibuya Kokaido
27 November 1983	Tokyo	Japan	Shibuya Kokaido
29 November 1983	Tokyo	Japan	Shinjuku Kosei Nenkin Kaikan
30 November 1983	Tokyo	Japan	Nakano Sunplaza
