= October Tour =

1981–82 concert tour by U2

- Tour by U2
- Poster to the concert in Antwerp, Belgium
- Location: Europe; North America
- Associated album: October
- Start date: 16 August 1981
- End date: 7 August 1982
- Legs: 5
- No. of shows: 102

U2 concert chronology
- Boy Tour (1980–1981); October Tour (1981–1982); War Tour (1982–1983)

The October Tour was the second concert tour by the Irish rock band U2 that took place in 1981 and 1982 to support the band's second studio album, October, which was released in October 1981.

== Itinerary ==
The tour followed a similar pattern to the previous tour and consisted of five legs, three in Europe and two in North America. The first leg began in Ireland in the August 1981 and ended in Berlin at the start of November, in total, 33 concerts were held. Soon after the first European leg, U2 travelled to North America to play 23 shows over the course of a month. Another European leg was held between December 1981 and February 1982 before heading back to the USA to fulfill the longest leg of the tour. The fourth leg ran from February through to April and was made up of 32 shows, considerably less than the European and American legs of the Boy tour. After a short break, the tour finished with a final 9 shows in Europe.

== Setlist ==
The setlist varied each night throughout the tour, with eight songs from October and ten from Boy being played. Songs such as "Rejoice", "Another Time, Another Place", "With a Shout (Jerusalem)", and "Fire" were dropped from the setlist towards the end of the tour. "Gloria" was used as the opener at almost every show, whilst "The Ocean" (used as the opener for the previous tour) was played predominantly as the closing song.

== Tour dates ==
Date	City	Country	Venue
Leg 1: Europe
16 August 1981	County Meath	Ireland	Slane Castle
23 August 1981	London	England	Paris Theater
29 August 1981	Gateshead	England	Gateshead International Stadium
30 August 1981	Odell	England	Odell Castle
31 August 1981	Edinburgh	Scotland	Coasters
2 September 1981	Stockholm	Sweden	Underground
1 October 1981	Norwich	England	University of East Anglia
2 October 1981	Nottingham	England	Rock City
3 October 1981	Salford	England	Salford University
4 October 1981	Glasgow	Scotland	Tiffany's
6 October 1981	Coventry	England	Warwick University
7 October 1981	Leicester	England	Leicester Polytechnic Arena
8 October 1981	Sheffield	England	Lyceum
9 October 1981	Newcastle	England	Mayfair Ballroom
10 October 1981	Liverpool	England	Royal Court Theatre
12 October 1981	Brighton	England	Top Rank
13 October 1981	Portsmouth	England	Mecca Locarno
14 October 1981	Cardiff	Wales	Top Rank
16 October 1981	Stoke-on-Trent	England	Kings Hall
17 October 1981	Bracknell	England	Bracknell Sports Centre
18 October 1981	Bristol	England	Locarno
19 October 1981	Birmingham	England	Locarno
20 October 1981	Leeds	England	Tiffany's
21 October 1981	Hemel Hempstead	England	Hemel Hempstead Pavilion
23 October 1981	Brussels	Belgium	Ancienne Belgique
24 October 1981	Deinze	Belgium	Brielpoort
25 October 1981	Herenthout	Belgium	Zaal Lux
26 October 1981	Paris	France	Élysée Montmartre
28 October 1981	Leiden	Netherlands	Stadsgehoorzaal
29 October 1981	Tilburg	Netherlands	De Harmonie
30 October 1981	Amsterdam	Netherlands	Paradiso
31 October 1981	Arnhem	Netherlands	Stokvishal
1 November 1981	Rotterdam	Netherlands	De Lantaarn
3 November 1981	Hamburg	West Germany	Fabrik
4 November 1981	West Berlin	West Germany	Metropol
Leg 2: North America and Europe
13 November 1981	Albany	United States	J.B. Scott's
14 November 1981	Boston	United States	Orpheum Theatre
15 November 1981	New Haven	United States	Toad's Place
17 November 1981	Providence	United States	Center Stage
18 November 1981	Philadelphia	United States	Ripley's Music Hall
20 November 1981	New York City	United States	The Ritz Club
21 November 1981	New York City	United States	The Ritz Club
22 November 1981	New York City	United States	The Ritz Club
24 November 1981	Passaic	United States	Hitsville North Nightclub
25 November 1981	Asbury Park	United States	Hitsville South Nightclub
28 November 1981	Los Angeles	United States	Hollywood Palladium
29 November 1981	San Francisco	United States	The Warfield Theatre
1 December 1981	Atlanta	United States	The Agora
2 December 1981	Nashville	United States	Underwood Auditorium
4 December 1981	Royal Oak	United States	Royal Oak Music Theatre
5 December 1981	Grand Rapids	United States	Fountain Street Church
6 December 1981	Chicago	United States	Park West
7 December 1981	Lansing	United States	Dooley's
8 December 1981	Cleveland	United States	Agora Theatre
10 December 1981	Buffalo	United States	Uncle Sam's
11 December 1981	Washington, D.C.	United States	Ontario Theater
12 December 1981	Hartford	United States	Stage West
13 December 1981	Lido Beach	United States	Malibu Dance Club
20 December 1981	London	England	Lyceum Ballroom
21 December 1981	London	England	Lyceum Ballroom
23 January 1982	Galway	Ireland	Leisureland
24 January 1982	Cork	Ireland	Cork City Hall
26 January 1982	Dublin	Ireland	RDS Main Hall
Leg 3: North America
11 February 1982	New Orleans	United States	SS President Riverboat
13 February 1982	Austin	United States	The Opry House
14 February 1982	San Antonio	United States	Cardi's
15 February 1982	Houston	United States	Cardi's
16 February 1982	Dallas	United States	Cardi's
17 February 1982	Oklahoma City	United States	Jammy's
19 February 1982	St. Louis	United States	Night Moves
21 February 1982	Minneapolis	United States	First Avenue
22 February 1982	Madison	United States	Headliners
23 February 1982	Champaign	United States	University of Illinois
25 February 1982	Kansas City	United States	Uptown Theater
27 February 1982	Denver	United States	Rainbow Music Hall
28 February 1982	Lincoln	United States	Colorado State University
3 March 1982	Fort Myers	United States	Lee County Civic Center
4 March 1982	West Palm Beach	United States	Civic Auditorium
5 March 1982	Tampa	United States	Curtis Hixon Hall
6 March 1982	Tallahassee	United States	Leon County Arena
~~7 March 1982~~	Jacksonville	United States	Jacksonville University
10 March 1982	Knoxville	United States	University of Tennessee
11 March 1982	Atlanta	United States	Atlanta Civic Center
12 March 1982	Memphis	United States	North Hall Auditorium
14 March 1982	Indianapolis	United States	Indiana Convention Center
16 March 1982	Amherst	United States	Bowker Auditorium
17 March 1982	New York City	United States	The Ritz Club
18 March 1982	New York City	United States	The Ritz Club
19 March 1982	Garden City	United States	Nassau County Community College Ballroom
20 March 1982	Providence	United States	Alumnae Hall
21 March 1982	Phoenix	United States	Nightclub
25 March 1982	Phoenix	United States	Arizona Veterans Memorial Coliseum
26 March 1982	San Diego	United States	San Diego Sports Arena
27 March 1982	Los Angeles	United States	Los Angeles Sports Arena
29 March 1982	San Francisco	United States	San Francisco Civic Auditorium
30 March 1982	San Francisco	United States	San Francisco Civic Auditorium
