= 11 O'Clock Tick Tock =

Single by U2
- B-side: "Touch"
- Released: 16 May 1980
- Recorded: 5–6 April 1980
- Studio: Windmill Lane (Dublin)
- Genre: Rock; post-punk
- Length: 3:44
- Label: CBS Ireland; Island
- Songwriters: Bono; The Edge; Adam Clayton; Larry Mullen Jr.
- Producer: Martin Hannett

U2 singles chronology
"Another Day" (1980)	"11 O'Clock Tick Tock" (1980)	"A Day Without Me" (1980)

"11 O'Clock Tick Tock" is a song by Irish rock band U2. It was released as a single on 16 May 1980, and was produced by Martin Hannett. It followed their debut EP Three and the single "Another Day." It was the group's first release for Island Records. The song's lyrics were written by lead vocalist Bono based on his experience at a Cramps concert in London, where he watched a "lifeless, goth-style" crowd from the balcony.

After Island signed U2 in March 1980, the label recommended the band work with Hannett, believing he could improve their studio recordings without losing the energy of their live performances. Hannett travelled to Dublin in April 1980 to record "11 O'Clock Tick Tock" at Windmill Lane Studios. The group were impressed by Hannett's technically innovative production but had a difficult experience with him. They found him to be an eccentric personality and believed he had imposed his distinctive production style on their music. Although Hannett was in consideration to produce U2's debut album Boy, the band ultimately decided to hire Steve Lillywhite instead, beginning a career-spanning working relationship with him.

"11 O'Clock Tick Tock" did not chart at the time of its original release but later did after subsequent U2 releases: in January 1984, the song reached number 30 on the US Rock Albums & Top Tracks chart after its inclusion on the band's live album Under a Blood Red Sky a few months prior; in 2020, the song reached number 69 on the Irish Singles Chart after it was reissued for Record Store Day in commemoration of its 40th anniversary.

== Background ==
After signing a record deal with Island Records in March 1980, U2 began making plans to record an album and a single. Island A&R representative Nick Stewart was looking for a record producer who would improve the quality of the band's studio recordings without losing the energy of their live performances. He recommended they work with Martin Hannett, who was producing post-punk group Joy Division—U2's favourite band at the time, according to U2 lead vocalist Bono. Stewart thought Hannett would give them the push that they needed; he said of the producer: "The man had something that very few producers have—Phil Spector's one, George Martin's another. He was a genius." Stewart's assistant Annie Roseberry called Hannett a perfectionist who stood out from most producers of the time. U2 travelled to England to meet with Hannett, where they observed the recording sessions for Joy Division's single "Love Will Tear Us Apart". They played Hannett a demo of "11 O'Clock Tick Tock", and although he was not impressed with the recording, he liked the song.

== Recording ==
Hannett travelled to Dublin for the recording session, which took place at Windmill Lane Studios from 5–6 April 1980 on Easter weekend. He was not impressed with the studio's facilities and made the band rent equipment from London. Windmill Lane sound engineer Kevin Moloney called it a "wild, wild session" and said that Hannett lived up to his reputation as a "mad genius". The producer did creative things with electronics during the session that the band had never heard before. He obsessed over details and insisted that each sound be isolated and recorded separately. He crafted the song's bassline by recording each individual note played by bassist Adam Clayton on a separate track before sequencing them together. Moloney thought the band were "freaked out" by Hannett's eccentric personality and attitude. They suspected him of using acid in the studio; at one point, Hannett fell backwards out of his chair and exclaimed, "Jesus Christ! I've just hallucinated a gherkin!"

The group were nervous during the session, having never recorded in a studio with a proper producer before. Clayton believes that nervousness affected the band's performances. The rhythm section, in particular, had issues playing at a consistent tempo, as they continually sped up during the song. Hannett asked drummer Larry Mullen Jr. to use a click track to stay in time, but Mullen was unsure he could play with one, having never done so before. At one point, Hannett said to guitarist the Edge, "What are we going to do? It's three in the morning and the rhythm section can't play in time together!" During the session, fellow Dublin band the Atrix confronted U2 at the studio and accused them of plagiarising the guitar riff of "11 O'Clock Tick Tock" from their song "Treasure on the Wasteland". After the Atrix left, U2 were in a dour mood, uncertain how to remedy the situation. Engineer Paul Thomas suggested adding a backwards recording of a cymbal to the song, which they did.

After completing the backing track, Hannett was keen to record the vocals and begin mixing, but the Edge felt that they "could do a bit more" and suggested overdubbing additional guitar parts. Hannett was baffled but told the Edge to proceed. The guitarist walked into the recording room unsure what he would play and improvised a harmony to the main guitar riff. Hannett was excited by the addition, saying: "God, it sounds like brass. I love it!"

== Mixing ==
Hannett insisted that the song be mixed at 3 a.m. because he deemed it the "most creative time". He and Moloney stayed up for three days without sleep during the protracted mixing phase, making tape loops in an attempt to fix the band's poor timekeeping. Hannett also wanted to apply his trademark drum sound, which was achieved by processing the snare drum through an effects unit called a Time Modulator. After finishing, he reset all the settings on the unit so the engineers would be unable to see what he did. After Hannett returned to London with the tape recordings, the band rejected his first mix but accepted his follow-up attempt.

Three mixes of "11 O'Clock Tick Tock" are publicly known to exist, all studio cuts. The 1980 single features the 3:47 single mix. The Martin Hannett tribute album And Here Is the Young Man features a 4:03 mix. The final mix is a 4:13 version with a longer intro that featured on the 1984 UK "Pride (In the Name of Love)" 12-inch limited edition single.

== Composition ==
The "11 O'Clock Tick Tock" title was taken from a note that Bono's friend Gavin Friday left on the front door of Bono's house after he was unable to reach him by telephone one night. The lyrics of the song were inspired by Bono's experience at a Cramps concert at the Electric Ballroom in London, where he watched a "lifeless, goth-style" crowd from the balcony. The sight disillusioned him: "There was a lostness in the looks on their faces. It was that sepulchral make-up, white face, dark eyes... it felt like the end of the world."

The harmonic guitar section towards the end of the song features an incorporation of the Third Quarter chime of the Westminster Quarters from the Big Ben clock tower, at the Palace of Westminster in London.

== Release and commercial performance ==
"11 O'Clock Tick Tock" was originally released as a single in May 1980, but it failed to chart.

In November 1983, U2 released their live album Under a Blood Red Sky, on which a performance of "11 O'Clock Tick Tock" appears. The song subsequently entered the Billboard Rock Albums & Top Tracks chart in the United States on 10 December 1983 at number 35, and it peaked at number 30 on 21 January 1984.

"11 O'Clock Tick Tock" was reissued on Record Store Day in 2020 to commemorate the 40th anniversary of its original release. It was pressed on translucent blue 12-inch vinyl weighing 180 grams and cut at 45 RPM. The release included previously unreleased live versions of "Touch" and "Twilight" from the band's performance at the Marquee in London in September 1980. After the single's reissue for Record Store Day, it reached number 69 on the Irish Singles Chart.

"11 O'Clock Tick Tock" was one of 40 songs that U2 re-recorded for their 2023 album Songs of Surrender.

== Live performances ==
"11 O'Clock Tick Tock" had its live debut in August 1979 with alternate lyrics, under the title "Silver Lining". It evolved into "11 O'Clock Tick Tock" between March and May 1980. "Touch", the B-side of the "11 O'Clock Tick Tock" single, evolved from an earlier song called "Trevor". "Touch" was played on the Boy Tour in 1980–1981, but has not been performed on any subsequent tours.

During the first half of the 1980s, "11 O'Clock Tick Tock" was one of U2's most popular live songs and it appears on the 1983 live LP Under a Blood Red Sky and concert film Live at Red Rocks: Under a Blood Red Sky. On U2's early tours, it was often played twice due to a lack of material – once early in the concert, and then during the encore. Until December 1982, it was routinely paired with "The Ocean", a song from the band's debut album Boy. This live pairing is available on the "Fire" single.

After the Unforgettable Fire Tour concluded in July 1985, "11 O'Clock Tick Tock" has been played thirteen times, including seven performances on 2001's Elevation Tour. Its last live appearance was at the Roxy theatre in 2015 during a promotional appearance on the Innocence + Experience Tour. The frequency of its early performances means that it is still one of U2's 25 most-performed live songs.

== Aftermath ==
The experience of working with Hannett was not a happy one for U2, who felt that he had imposed his distinctive production ambience upon their sound, and the personal chemistry between Hannett and the band had also been poor. Island Records had been considering him for the role of the producer of the band's yet-to-be-recorded debut album, Boy, but this was dropped after the band objected. Hannett was also severely affected by the May 1980 suicide of Joy Division frontman Ian Curtis, the distress of which temporarily impaired his ability to continue work. Stewart said: "Martin by that stage was unwell; he seemed to be suffering from a little overdose of one thing or another." U2 instead selected Steve Lillywhite to produce Boy.

== Track listing ==
7" vinyl
No.	Title	Length
1.	"11 O'Clock Tick Tock"	3:44
2.	"Touch"	3:21

== Charts ==
Chart (1984)	Peak position
US Rock Albums & Top Tracks (Billboard)	30

Chart (2020)	Peak position
Irish Singles (IRMA)	69
