= Boy (album) =

Studio album by U2
- Released: 20 October 1980
- Recorded: July–September 1980
- Studios: Windmill Lane (Dublin, Ireland)
- Genres: Post-punk; new wave
- Length: 42:52
- Label: Island
- Producer: Steve Lillywhite

U2 chronology
Three (1979)	Boy (1980)	October (1981)

North American cover

Singles from Boy
- 1. "A Day Without Me" Released: 18 August 1980; 2. "I Will Follow" Released: 24 October 1980

Boy is the debut studio album by the Irish rock band U2. It was produced by Steve Lillywhite and was released on 20 October 1980 by Island Records. Boy contains songs from the band's 40-song repertoire at the time, including two tracks that were re-recorded from their original versions on the group's debut release, the EP Three.

Boy was recorded from July to September 1980 at Dublin's Windmill Lane Studios, which became U2's chosen recording location during the 1980s. It was their first time working with Lillywhite, who employed non-standard production techniques, such as recording drummer Larry Mullen Jr. playing in a stairwell, and recording smashed bottles and cutlery skimmed against a spinning bicycle wheel. The band found Lillywhite to be very encouraging and creative, and he subsequently became a frequent producer of their recorded work. Thematically, the album's lyrics reflect on adolescence, innocence, and the passage into adulthood, themes represented on its cover artwork through the photo of a young boy's face.

Boy received generally positive reviews and included one of U2's first singles to receive airplay on US radio, "I Will Follow". The release was followed by the band's first tour of continental Europe and the US, the Boy Tour. The album peaked on the UK chart at number 52 in August 1981 and in the US at number 63. In 2003, Boy was ranked 417th on Rolling Stone's list of "The 500 Greatest Albums of All Time". In 2008, a remastered edition of the record was released.

== Background ==
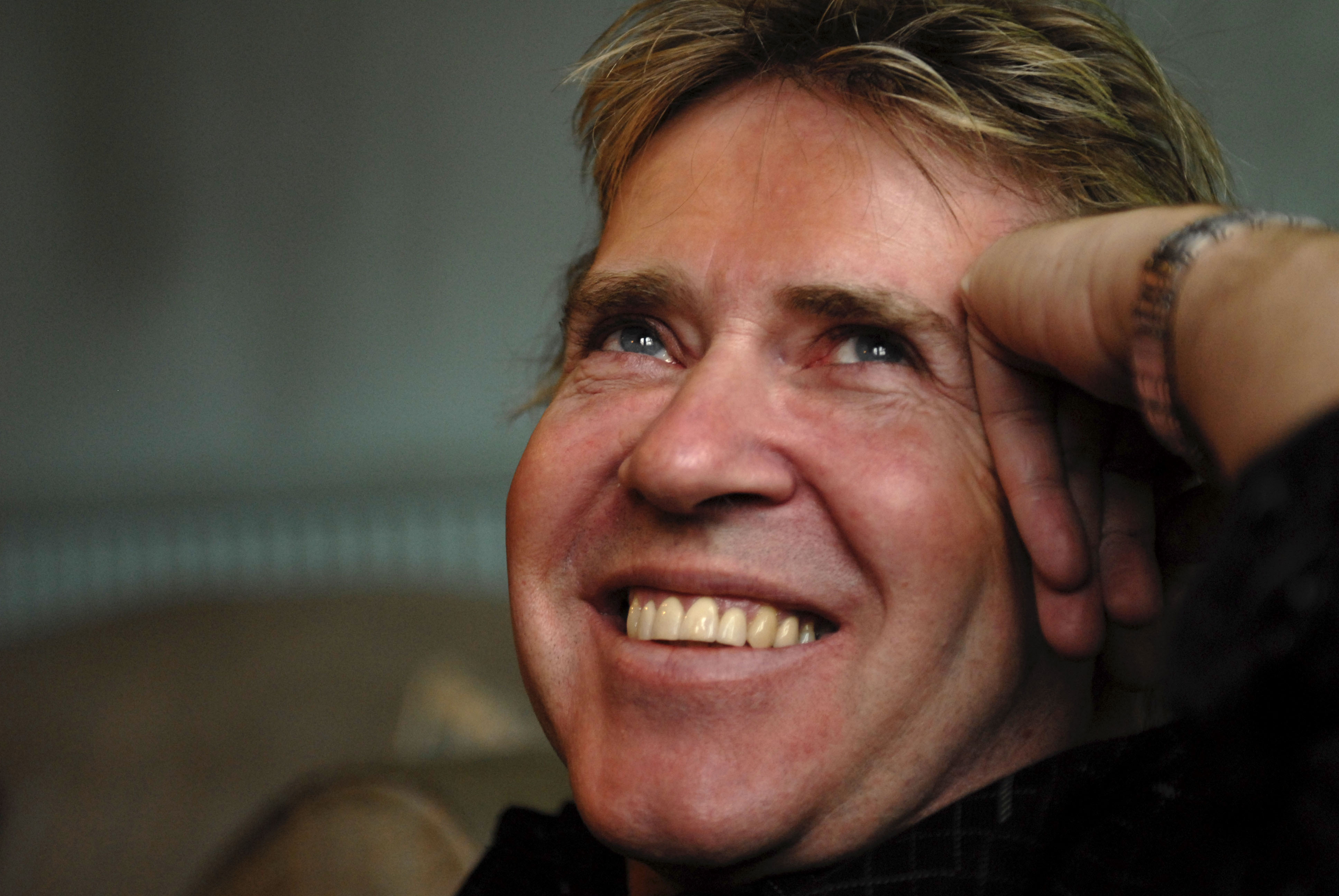
Steve Lillywhite produced Boy, as well as U2's subsequent two albums.

Originally, Boy was slated to be produced by Martin Hannett, an in-demand producer at that time for his critically acclaimed work with Joy Division. Hannett had produced U2's first single with Island Records, "11 O'Clock Tick Tock", but the band did not enjoy working with him, and the prospect of him producing the album was abandoned by Island due to the band's objections. Hannett was also severely affected by the May 1980 suicide of Joy Division frontman Ian Curtis, the distress of which temporarily impaired his ability to work. Island A&R representative Nick Stewart said: "Martin by that stage was unwell; he seemed to be suffering from a little overdose of one thing or another."

Looking for a replacement producer, Island sent a copy of U2's first release, the EP Three (1979), to Steve Lillywhite to gauge his interest in working with them. Listening to the record, he "liked the voice" but thought "it didn't sound very good". Before deciding whether to work with the group, he wanted to see them perform live to figure out a potential creative approach he could take in studio. After visiting Ireland to attend a concert of theirs at a small school hall, Lillywhite was convinced to come on board, thinking, "Oh my God, there's something about this". He subsequently agreed to produce a single for them, "A Day Without Me". Although the song failed to chart, U2 found they could work amicably with Lillywhite and agreed to have him produce their debut studio album.

== Recording ==
Boy was recorded at Windmill Lane Studios in Dublin from July to September 1980. Lillywhite was displeased with how the "A Day Without Me" single had sounded, particularly the drums, and decided to change how he recorded the band for the rest of the album. He found Windmill Lane Studios to be "very, very dead sounding" and thought it was more conducive to capturing quiet recordings of folk music than the energy of rock music; engineer Kevin Moloney concurred, calling the studio a "late '70s design, a very wooden dead kind of room". At that stage in his career, Lillywhite was interested in capturing "3D sound" that conveyed a perspective to the recording. While walking through the stone-walled reception area of the studio, he was impressed with how the space sounded and decided to record drummer Larry Mullen Jr.'s drum kit in the area's stairwell. Using microphones hung from the ceiling at the top of the stairwell, Lillywhite recorded what he described as "this wonderful clattery sound". They had to wait until the studio's receptionist went home in the evenings to record the drums, as the phone rang during the day. Even in the evenings, they were not allowed to disable the phone's ringer, resulting in it occasionally interrupting recording in the middle of a take. Mullen found the arrangement strange at first, as he was still acclimating to working with his bandmates together in a studio when Lillywhite set him up separate from the others.

Lillywhite employed a creative, experimental approach as the producer, recording smashed bottles and silverware skimmed against a spinning bicycle wheel for sound effects. The band found him to be very encouraging; lead vocalist Bono called him "such a breath of fresh air", while guitarist the Edge said he "had a great way of pulling the best out of everybody". The group's rhythm section struggled to keep time at that stage in their career, forcing Lillywhite and Moloney to spend extensive amounts of time at night splicing tape of the multi-track recordings to create drum loops that would be in time. Lillywhite recorded several bass parts played by Adam Clayton in order to teach Clayton the bassline that he ultimately wanted to be played. The approach necessitated Clayton recording many overdubs. With the band members still inexperienced at that point and manager Paul McGuinness giving them autonomy in their music-making process, Lillywhite speculated that he had more influence over the sound of Boy than any other producer of any other U2 album.

Some of the songs, including "An Cat Dubh" and "The Ocean", were written and recorded at the studio. Many of the songs were taken from the band's 40-song repertoire at the time, including "Stories for Boys", "Out of Control" and "Twilight". Without much studio time, the band quickly recorded each song, before spending a few hours on overdubs and moving onto the next song. Bono had not finalized his lyrics prior to the recording sessions; during the group's earlier live performances, he often changed lyrics from concert to concert, owing to his lack of interest in lyric writing. The procrastination forced him to finish missing couplets in the studio while his bandmates were busy recording guitars and percussion. Bono was displeased with the vocal performances that he gave in the studio when wearing headphones, and as a result, he changed his approach to sing into a handheld microphone in the control room while listening to playback of the music at high volume. After about six takes of each song, Lillywhite would edit together a composite vocal track of the best parts, after which Bono would listen back and replicate the results by singing another six takes.

== Composition and songwriting ==
The Edge recorded all the songs using his Gibson Explorer guitar, and he drew inspiration from music he was listening to at the time, including Television and early Siouxsie and the Banshees. When asked by Elvis Costello about the band's musical influences at the time, the Edge explained: "I think we were influenced a lot by music that was rooted in Europe, the German sort of sensibility, the music of Neu! and Kraftwerk, which was about a different sort of way of using chord changes and a sort of nihilistic approach to the backbeat", "and the UK bands", "like [Siouxsie and] the Banshees, probably Echo & the Bunnymen" "and Magazine".

The album's theme is the psychological nature of the transition of adolescence from childhood to manhood, with lyrics and atmospheric music examining a dawn of sexuality ("An Cat Dubh"), the entry into adolescence ("Twilight"), mortality ("Out of Control"), the exile from one's past enforced by the passage of time ("Into the Heart"), mental disturbance ("The Electric Co.") and youthful ambition ("The Ocean"). "I Will Follow" focused on the trauma of the early death of Bono's mother when he was 14 years old. The album's lyrics contain several literary references. For example, "Shadows and Tall Trees" takes its name from a chapter title in the dystopian William Golding novel Lord of the Flies, and "The Ocean" mentions Oscar Wilde's novel The Picture of Dorian Gray.

Music author and ambient historian Mark Prendergast writes that Boy has "an aquatic quality, contrasting anthemic rock songs with brooding instrumental passages of spray, fine drizzle and lapping waves". He further highlighted Lillywhite's addition of musique concrète sounds, namely milk bottles and scraped bicycle spokes, to "I Will Follow", and commented that the Edge's "unconventional approach" to his Gibson Explorer throughout the record "was to eschew blues influences for echoed chords and sustained harmonics. He used a system of two Vox amplifiers coupled to two Memory Man echo units linked to a switchbox connected to his guitar." Music critic Mark Cooper reflected that "U2's sound seemed to have come out of nowhere"; he added that the album's "drive and exuberance belongs to punk", citing Mullen's crashing drums, the more glam-derived riffs of the Edge, and the chorus of "Stories for Boys" for their similarities with punk's "football terrace" sound, but commented that the band's "emotional palette" was distinct from punk: "Here was a music thriving on teenage spiritual awakenings with a musical approach that owed next to nothing to tradition."

== Artwork ==
The model boy on the cover is Peter Rowen, the younger brother of Guggi, Bono's friend and a former member of the Virgin Prunes. Peter also appeared on the covers of Three, War, The Best of 1980–1990, the unreleased Even Better than the Early Stuff, Early Demos and many singles. The photographer, Hugo McGuiness, and the sleeve designer, Steve Averill (a friend of Clayton), went on to work on several more U2 album covers.

For the American release and other international distributors, the album's cover image was changed, due to Island Records' fears that it could be perceived as pedophilic. The label's in-house designer Bruno Tilley commissioned artist and photographer Sandy Porter to design the new cover. The two were given a very limited budget, precluding them from traveling to U2 and taking photos of them, leaving them with little choice but to use photos of the four band members from a prior shoot. Tilley visited Porter in London to collaborate on the cover. Porter's initial idea was to distort the images and create a "more graphic, stylised piece of artwork", leading to several experiments. These included: photocopying the images and pulling them during the scanning; using a photographic enlarger while moving the baseboard; and photographing the image prints using long exposure while moving them. The result of these processes gave Porter the "raw material" to continue, though some areas of the images did not distort well and were subsequently marked up with a black pen. Taking inspiration from the Lord of the Flies reference in the song "Shadows and Tall Trees", Porter selected four "rough and distorted images that had a feel how the sea washes and distorts marks in the sand". He then cut the images with a scalpel, spray mounted them, and further "copied, printed, touched up, recopied and printed" them onto high-contrast photographic paper.

== Release ==
Boy was released on 20 October 1980 in the UK, and 3 March 1981 in the US. The album reached number 52 in the UK. In the US, it peaked at number 63 on the Billboard 200, but after the success of U2's later material, it re-entered the American charts for a lengthier spell. In the band's native Ireland, the album reached number 13, and it placed highest in Canada at number 12. The original releases of Boy sold nearly 200,000 copies.

"A Day Without Me" and "I Will Follow" were released as singles on 18 August and 24 October 1980, respectively. "I Will Follow" peaked at number 20 on the Billboard Top Tracks rock chart in the US, becoming a hit on college radio and establishing a buzz surrounding the group's debut.

The album's sexual overtones led to its enthusiastic acceptance in American gay clubs shortly after its release. Bono commented on this phenomenon, saying: "import copies got in and, as you know, in America a lot of music is broken in gay clubs and so we had a gay audience, a lot of people who were convinced the music was specifically for them. So there was a misconception if you like."

In 2008, a remastered edition of Boy was released, featuring remastered tracks, along with B-sides and rarities. Three different formats of the remaster were made available. The artwork for the remastered editions of the album was standardised worldwide to that of the 1980 UK release. For Record Store Day 2020, in commemoration of its 40th anniversary, the album was reissued on white vinyl in a limited edition of 10,000 copies.

== Critical reception ==
Professional ratings
Review scores
Source	Rating
Hot Press	11/12
The Muncie Evening Press	9/10
Record Mirror	5/5 stars
Rolling Stone (Debra Rae Cohen)	3.5/5 stars
Rolling Stone (Dave Marsh)	4/5 stars
Smash Hits	8 1/2/10
Sounds	4.5/5 stars
The Village Voice	C+

Boy received generally favourable reviews. Paul Morley of NME called it "honest, direct and distinctive", adding that he found it "touching, precocious, full of archaic and modernist conviction". Betty Page of Sounds said that they "achieved a rare mixture of innocence and aggression", and described the album as "an overall feeling of loving care and energy intertwined with simplistic and direct hooks and chords". Lyndyn Barber from Melody Maker hailed it as a "rich" record, writing that "Boy is more than just a collection of good tracks assembled in an arbitrary order", and that it had "youthful innocence and confusion". Robin Denselow of The Guardian wrote that it was a "strong debut album", praising Lillywhite for helping U2 improve since a live show that the reviewer attended. Denselow said the group succeeded at their goal of achieving a balance of "power and sensitivity" and said the record "only needs slightly stronger melodies to be very impressive indeed". Time Out's critic Ian Birch hailed Boy as a "timely" album and said, "Firing off a tradition laid down by the likes of Magazine, [Siouxsie and] the Banshees and Joy Division, U2 have injected their own brand of grace and sinewy spaciousness to create a romanticism exactly right for those who sport chunky riffs and mackintoshes". Declan Lynch of Irish magazine Hot Press remarked that he found Boy "almost impossible to react negatively to". K.R. Walston of the Albuquerque Journal said that U2 "knows how to nurse a listener along, toying with tempo and chord structures just enough to sound original but not overly avant garde". The review concluded, "the future shines brightly for bands like this". In Musician, journalist David Fricke called Boy a "brilliant, exhilarating record: eleven intense, yet articulate outbursts of song that together stand as the '80s answer to My Generation".

Terry Atkinson of the Los Angeles Times called Boy a "subtly ravishing first album, by turns pretty, propulsive, playful and irresistably catchy", while further describing it as "supple and melodic, but tough and vital as well". Atkinson believed that the lyrics had "occasionally trite or vague passages" but were transcended by Bono's "heartfelt, soaring vocals". Sean McAdam of The Boston Globe described it as "a hypnotic album with nuance" that he "recommended without a bit of reservation". He praised Lillywhite's production for creating an "eerie ambience" and said of the band, "U2 have the musical chops, a compelling vocalist... and most importantly 4-minute pop songs that sound at once concise and infectious". Scot Anderson of the Iowa City Press-Citizen called Boy "an album that, while flawed, shows the potential of the band". Anderson thought certain songs were too long or too short, but believed U2 distinguished themselves from their peers with their spirit and humanity, making "a most refreshing splash in the New Wave". Dave Marsh of Rolling Stone said the record's music was "unpretentious and riveting" and called U2 "easily the best Irish rock band since Van Morrison's original Them troupe". He also lauded Lillywhite for his "always spearheaded production". In a separate review for Rolling Stone, Debra Rae Cohen found the band skilled and likeable while crediting Lillywhite for helping them "blend echoes of several of Britain's more adventurous bands into a sound that's rich, lively and comparatively commercial." Overall, she believed the album did not live up to the high standard set by the opening track "I Will Follow", finding most of it "diffuse and uneven". More critical was Robert Christgau, who dismissed the album in his "Consumer Guide" column for The Village Voice: "Their youth, their serious air, and their guitar sound are setting a small world on fire, and I fear the worst." The album finished in 18th place on the "Best Albums" list from The Village Voice's 1981 Pazz & Jop critics' poll.

== Boy Tour ==
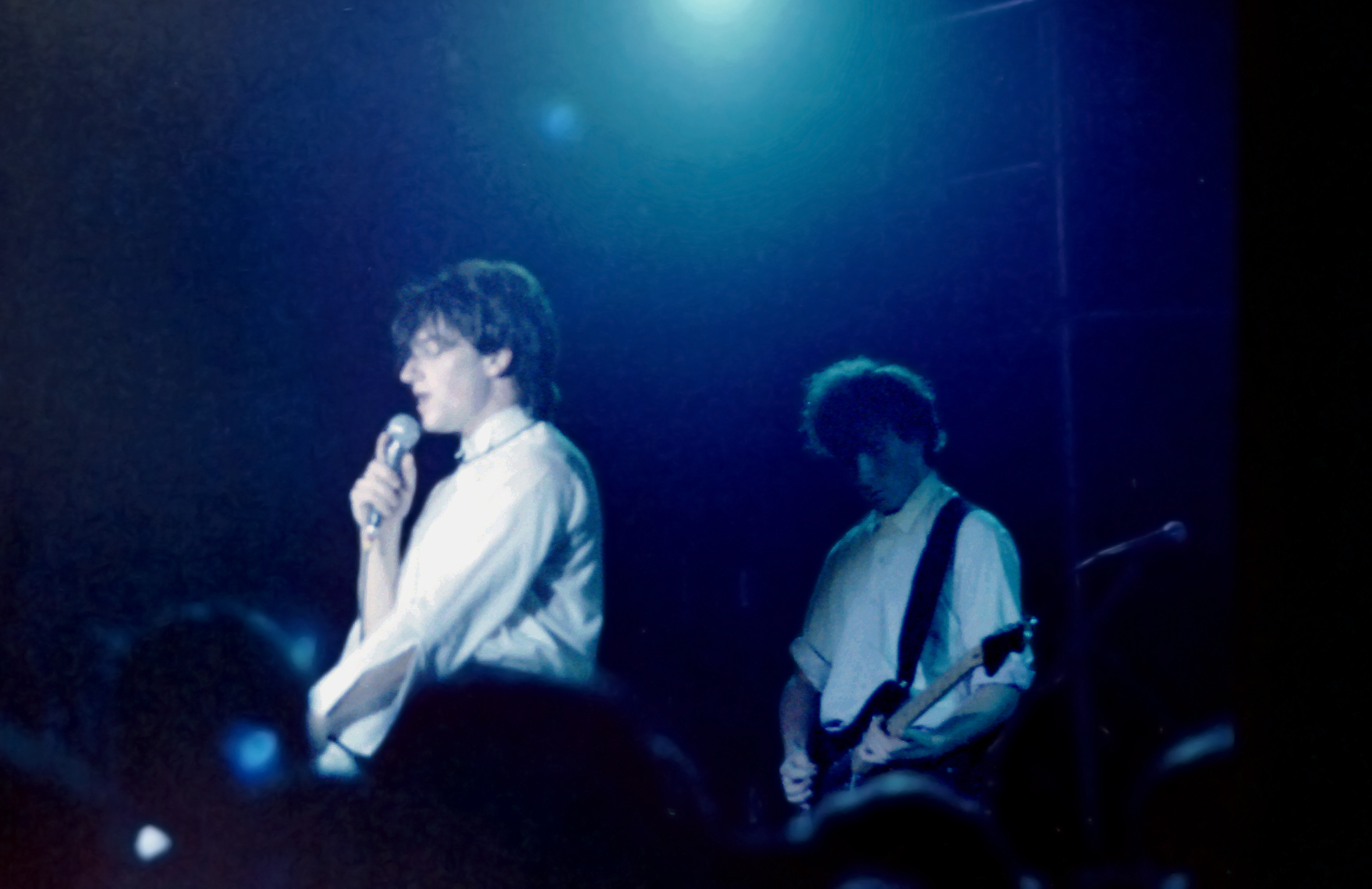
Bono and the Edge performing on the Boy Tour in May 1981

Following the album's release, U2 embarked on the Boy Tour, their first concert tour of continental Europe and the US. Despite being unpolished, these early live performances demonstrated the band's potential, as critics complimented their ambition and Bono's exuberance. On an otherwise successful American leg of the tour, Bono's briefcase containing in-progress lyrics and musical ideas (which were intended for the group's second album, October) was lost backstage during a March 1981 performance at a nightclub in Portland, Oregon.

== Legacy ==
Retrospective professional ratings
Review scores
Source	Rating
AllMusic	4/5 stars
The Austin Chronicle	4/5 stars
The A.V. Club	A
Chicago Tribune	2.5/4 stars
Entertainment Weekly	B
Mojo	4/5 stars
Pitchfork	8.3/10
Q	4/5 stars
The Rolling Stone Album Guide	4/5 stars
Spin Alternative Record Guide	6/10

In 2003, Boy was included at number 417 on Rolling Stone's list of "The 500 Greatest Albums of All Time". The magazine wrote, "Too ingenuous for punk, too unironic for new wave, U2 arrived on Boy as big-time dreamers with the ambition to back it up." In 2006, Uncut ranked the album at number 59 on its list of the "100 Greatest Debut Albums". It was ranked as the seventh-best U2 album in a 2017 list by Newsweek's Zach Schonfeld, who also called it "a U2 album without the ego" and the "preaching or presumptions of saving the world" that plagued them in the future. In 2020, Rolling Stone included Boy in their "80 Greatest albums of 1980" list, praising the band for creating "an incredible collection of songs steeped in lost innocence and apprehensions about entering the adult world." In The Austin Chronicle, Margaret Moser recalled the popularity of Boy in Austin amidst the closures and decline of local music clubs: "The newer, hipper Club Foot was a beacon, and we danced away the summer on its cement floor to U2. Boy was a glimmer of hope in the approaching darkness of the Reagan years". In her opinion, the record was "a shout disguised as a whisper, the calm before a storm", its musical formula foreshadowing the band's subsequent success. Reviewing the 2008 reissue, Q appraised Boy as a remarkably ambitious debut, noting a distinct "adolescent energy" and "gauche charm" to the album, while Mojo said it retained its "palpable ardency" years after its release. According to Steven Hyden of The A.V. Club, "Boy showed U2 had a strong enough musical identity to command the world's attention from the very beginning".

Some critics have been less impressed by the album in retrospect. Writing for Entertainment Weekly, Bill Wyman found it "heady" but "erratic", while Chicago Tribune critic Greg Kot described the album as "callow post-punk that owes a lot to Joy Division and early Public Image Ltd." According to Ann Powers in the Spin Alternative Record Guide (1995), the album "established what might be called [U2's] revelationary reputation, hints at the impulse toward faith (after all, its hit was 'I Will Follow'), but mostly communicates confusion of the adolescent variety." Uncut critic David Quantick was more negative in his reappraisal, recalling his enjoyment of the album in 1980 as a "rockier" contemporary of Joy Division and Echo & the Bunnymen, in spite of Bono's "preening" vocal performance, but upon listening to the reissue, felt "shock at how bad it is". He wrote: "Lilywhite's production is stunningly thin, Bono's voice is awful, the lyrics are dismal, and only the singles—the Ian Curtis-obsessed 'I Will Follow' and the great 'Out of Control'—stand up. The rest is awful prog noodling". In 2025, Radio X included the album in its list of "The 25 best indie debut albums of the 1980s".

Boy is one of only three U2 albums from which every song has been performed live at least once. Boy held this distinction individually until 2017 when all songs from The Joshua Tree were performed live on the album's 30th anniversary tour.

== Track listing ==
All tracks are written by U2.

Side one
No.	Title	Length
1.	"I Will Follow"	3:40
2.	"Twilight"	4:22
3.	"An Cat Dubh"	4:46
4.	"Into the Heart"	3:27
5.	"Out of Control"	4:12

Side two
No.	Title	Length
1.	"Stories for Boys"	3:04
2.	"The Ocean"	1:34
3.	"A Day Without Me"	3:12
4.	"Another Time, Another Place"	4:31
5.	"The Electric Co."	4:47
6.	"Shadows and Tall Trees" (contains brief instrumental, "Saturday Matinee", on some copies)	5:13
Total length:		42:52

Early vinyl and some cassette copies have an unlisted and untitled 30-second instrumental sample at the end of the album (following "Shadows and Tall Trees") of "Saturday Night", a song that would later become "Fire" on the 1981 record October. It was dropped from most vinyl and all early CD versions, but was reinstated as an unlisted 12th track on the 2008 remastered edition of Boy and appeared in full for the first time as "Saturday Night" on the Deluxe Edition B-sides CD. The 30-second sample is now known as "Saturday Matinee" since the release of the album on online streaming services. Until the remastered release of Boy, it was referred to as an early sample of the song "Fire".

Some pressings of the album, (mostly in North America) indexed the track length of "An Cat Dubh" and "Into the Heart" at 6:21 and 1:53, respectively. The 2008 remastered edition of the album reinstated the original European track lengths of 4:47 and 3:28. Early compact disc releases (West German-pressed and in a digipak) combined the two songs into a single track at 8:15, as did some US jewel-case versions (on the disc itself, but not on the packaging).

== 2008 remastered edition ==
On 9 April 2008 U2.com confirmed that the band's first three albums (Boy, October and War) would be re-released as newly remastered versions. The remastered Boy was released on 21 July 2008 in the UK, with the US version following it the next day. As with The Joshua Tree, the cover artwork has been standardised to the original UK release. The remaster of Boy was released in three different formats:

1. Standard format: A single CD with re-mastered audio and restored packaging. Includes a 16-page booklet featuring previously unseen photos, full lyrics and new liner notes by Paul Morley. The 11 tracks match the previous release of the album.
2. Deluxe format: A standard CD (as above) and a bonus CD including b-sides, live tracks and rarities. Also includes a 32-page booklet with previously unseen photos, full lyrics, new liner notes by Paul Morley, and explanatory notes on the bonus material by the Edge.
3. Vinyl format: A single album remastered version on 180 gram vinyl with restored packaging.

=== Bonus CD ===
All tracks are written by U2.

No.	Title	Original release	Length
1.	"I Will Follow" (Previously unreleased mix)	Previously unreleased	3:38
2.	"11 O'Clock Tick Tock" (Single version)	"11 O'Clock Tick Tock" single	3:47
3.	"Touch" (Single version)	"11 O'Clock Tick Tock" single	3:26
4.	"Speed of Life" (Instrumental)	Previously unreleased outtake from Boy sessions	3:19
5.	"Saturday Night" (Early version of "Fire")	Previously unreleased outtake from Boy sessions	5:13
6.	"Things to Make and Do"	"A Day Without Me" single	2:17
7.	"Out of Control" (Single version)	Three EP	3:53
8.	"Boy-Girl" (Single version)	Three EP	3:23
9.	"Stories for Boys" (Single version)	Three EP	2:42
10.	"Another Day" (Single version)	"Another Day" single	3:28
11.	"Twilight" (Single version)	"Another Day" single	4:35
12.	"Boy-Girl" (Live at The Marquee, London, 22 September 1980)	"I Will Follow" single	3:26
13.	"11 O'Clock Tick Tock" (Live at The Marquee, London, 22 September 1980)	Previously unreleased	4:59
14.	"Cartoon World" (Live at The National Stadium, Dublin, 26 February 1980)	Previously unreleased	4:20
Total length:			52:26

== Personnel ==
Personnel taken from Boy liner notes, except where noted.

U2

- Bono – vocals, glockenspiel
- The Edge – guitar, vocals, glockenspiel
- Adam Clayton – bass guitar
- Larry Mullen Jr. – drums

Technical

- Steve Lillywhite – producer, sound effects
- Paul Thomas – engineer
- Kevin Moloney – assistant engineer
- John Dent – mastering
- Bono – sleeve design, layout
- Rapid Exteriors – sleeve design, layout
- Hugh McGuinness – "Boy" photographs

== Charts ==
=== Weekly charts ===
Chart (1980–1981)	Peak position
Australia (Kent Music Report)	35
Canada Top Albums/CDs (RPM)	12
New Zealand Albums (RMNZ)	13
Swedish Albums (Sverigetopplistan)	38
UK Albums (Official Charts)	52
US Billboard 200	63

Chart (1982)	Peak position
Dutch Albums (Album Top 100)	29

Chart (2001)	Peak position
Irish Albums (IRMA)	13

Chart (2008)	Peak position
Belgian Albums (Ultratop Flanders)	60
Belgian Albums (Ultratop Wallonia)	48
German Albums (Offizielle Top 100)	89
Italian Albums (FIMI)	36
Spanish Albums (Promusicae)	42

Chart (2020)	Peak position
Portuguese Albums (AFP)	38

=== Singles ===
Year	Song	Peak		
Year	Song	NZ	US Hot 100	US Main Rock
1981	"I Will Follow"	34	—	20
1984	"I Will Follow"	—	81	—
"—" denotes a release that did not chart.

== Certifications ==
Region	Certification	Certified units/sales
Australia (ARIA)	Gold	35,000^{^}
Canada (Music Canada)	Platinum	100,000^{^}
France (SNEP)	Gold	100,000^{*}
United Kingdom (BPI)	Gold	100,000^{^}
United States (RIAA)	Platinum	1,000,000^{^}
^{*} Sales figures based on certification alone.^{^} Shipments figures based on certification alone.

== See also ==
- U2 discography
