= The Electric Co. =

Song by U2

from the album Boy
- Released: 20 October 1980
- Recorded: July–September 1980
- Studio: Windmill Lane (Dublin)
- Genre: Rock, post-punk
- Length: 4:48
- Label: Island
- Songwriter: U2
- Producer: Steve Lillywhite

"The Electric Co." or "Cry/The Electric Co." is a song by Irish rock band U2, and is the tenth track on their debut album Boy, released in 1980.

== History ==
"Electric co." is an abbreviation for "electric convulsion therapy", which is an electric shock undergone by patients in psychiatry as part of their treatment. The band wrote this as a protest song in reference to a friend who tried to kill himself and as a result was taken to a psychiatric hospital that practiced electric convulsion therapy.

== Live performances ==
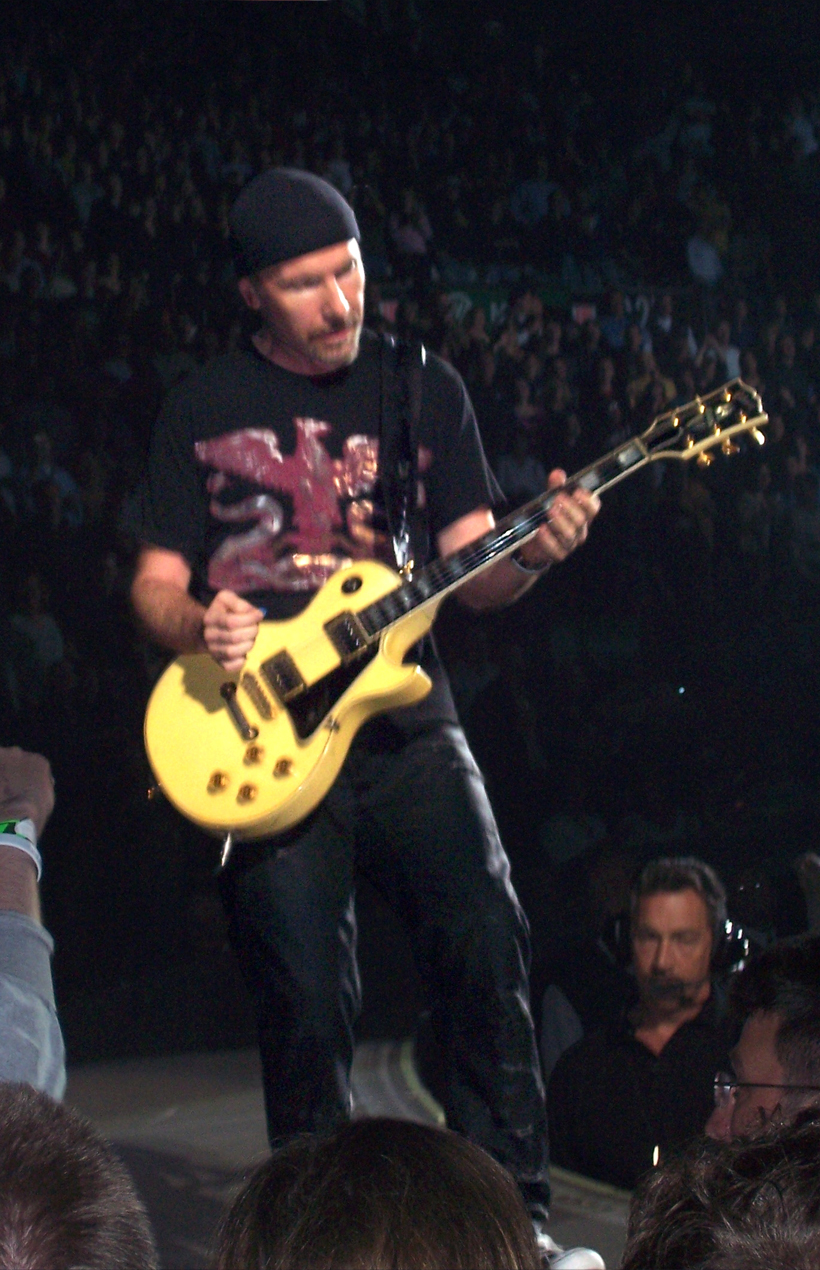
The Edge plays "The Electric Co." in a Vertigo Tour show in October 2005; this song returned to be a regular in concert set lists.

For live performances, a short song called "The Cry" or "Cry" has been linked to the beginning "The Electric Co". The riff from "The Cry" was later used in the song "Is That All?" from the group's 1981 album October. "The Electric Co." was sometimes titled "Cry/The Electric Co." because it was preceded by "The Cry". In the studio version of "The Electric Co." found on Boy, "The Cry" is not incorporated in the song.

"The Cry" preceded "The Electric Co." at every concert since 1980 in Edinburgh until the end of The Unforgettable Fire Tour. During this period, Bono sang a snippet of "Send in the Clowns" by Stephen Sondheim at the end of the song. During The Joshua Tree Tour, it was played without "The Cry", and the number of times they played this song was reduced. It was last performed on August 3, 1987.

On March 28, 2005, in San Diego, California, on the opening night of the Vertigo Tour, the song was performed for the first time in 17 years. It became a favorite on the Vertigo Tour. During the first leg of the tour it was preceded by "The Cry", but they stopped using it during the second leg, except in Montreal in the third set. Bono characterized "The Electric Co." by the fragments sung during the song, such as "Bullet with Butterfly Wings" by The Smashing Pumpkins and "I Can See for Miles" by The Who, as well as the returning snippet of "Send in the Clowns" plus others. The song was played in most of the concerts in the first leg, and all but one of the shows in the second leg, and remained constant during the third before becoming used more sporadically. It had only appeared in one of the 21 concerts in 2006. It was not played again until the Innocence + Experience Tour where it saw occasional performances played after the show opener "The Miracle (Of Joey Ramone)", again with "Send in the Clowns" and "I Can See for Miles" regularly snippeted.

== Live releases ==
"The Electric Co." has appeared in 3 video releases and 3 live album releases beginning with Under a Blood Red Sky, U2 Live at Red Rocks: Under a Blood Red Sky, Live from Boston 1981, Vertigo 2005: Live from Chicago and Live from Paris. In Under a Blood Red Sky, Bono sings a snippet of "Send in the Clowns" by Stephen Sondheim lasting 27 seconds. U2 didn't get permission to sing this song, causing them to pay US $50,000. The original release (along with other releases) contains the snippet, but others contained an edited version of the song. In U2 Live at Red Rocks, "Cry/The Electric Co." was not in the original release of the film because Bono repeats singing the snippet of "Send in the Clowns" without permission. Bono also climbs a lighting rig while holding a white flag, during a part in the song, which became the cover of both the album and the film. The 2008 remastered edition contains an edited version of the song. Six days prior to the Red Rocks performance, 23-year-old Bono scaled a 50-foot lighting rig holding a white flag during "The Electric Co." at the US Festival near San Bernardino, California on Memorial Day 1983, broadcast on MTV.

== See also ==
- List of covers of U2 songs - The Electric Co.
