= Windmill Lane Studios =

Recording studio in Dublin, Ireland

Windmill Lane Recording Studios
- Interactive map of Windmill Lane Recording Studios
- Location: 20 Ringsend Road; Dublin 4 D04 CF66; Ireland
- Coordinates: 53°20′32″N 6°14′05″W

Construction
- Opened: 1978

Website
- windmilllanerecording.com

Windmill Lane Recording Studios (earlier Windmill Lane Studios) is a recording studio in Dublin, Ireland. It was originally opened in 1978 by Brian Masterson and James Morris on Windmill Lane, and it subsequently relocated in 1990 to its current location at 20 Ringsend Road, Dublin 4, where it still operates as one of Ireland's largest recording studios.

Over the course of its history, the studios have been used by many notable artists including The Rolling Stones, Def Leppard, The Cranberries, U2, Simple Minds, Kate Bush, AC/DC, Hozier, The Spice Girls, Kylie Minogue, Niall Horan, Lewis Capaldi, Van Morrison, and Ed Sheeran.

The studios have become a tourist attraction which is open to the public. The studio also headquarters Pulse College, delivering industry training courses.

== History of old location ==
Windmill Lane Recording Studios was originally opened by recording engineer Brian Masterson and James Morris in 1978 and was first located in the Dublin Docklands on Windmill Lane, just off Sir John Rogerson's Quay. It was originally used to record traditional Irish music, notably by Planxty.

However, no Irish rock band recorded in the studios until U2. The drums on Boy were recorded in the reception area of the recording studios, due to producer Steve Lillywhite's desire to achieve "this wonderful clattery sound". They had to wait until the receptionist went home in the evenings, as the phone rang through the day and even occasionally in the evening.

After U2 made Windmill Lane their base, artists like Van Morrison, Sinéad O'Connor, and Elvis Costello recorded there. Clannad's hit "Theme from Harry's Game" was recorded at the studios, as well as two albums by Status Quo in 1980: Just Supposin' and Never Too Late, released in 1981. Kate Bush partially recorded her 1985 album Hounds of Love, and The Waterboys recorded their 1988 album Fisherman's Blues at Windmill Lane Studios.

The studios were expanded in the 1980s under the supervision of Andy Munro of Munro Acoustics. Much of the work was done specifically for U2's album The Joshua Tree. In 1990 the main studio moved to a new location on Ringsend Road, also in the Docklands.

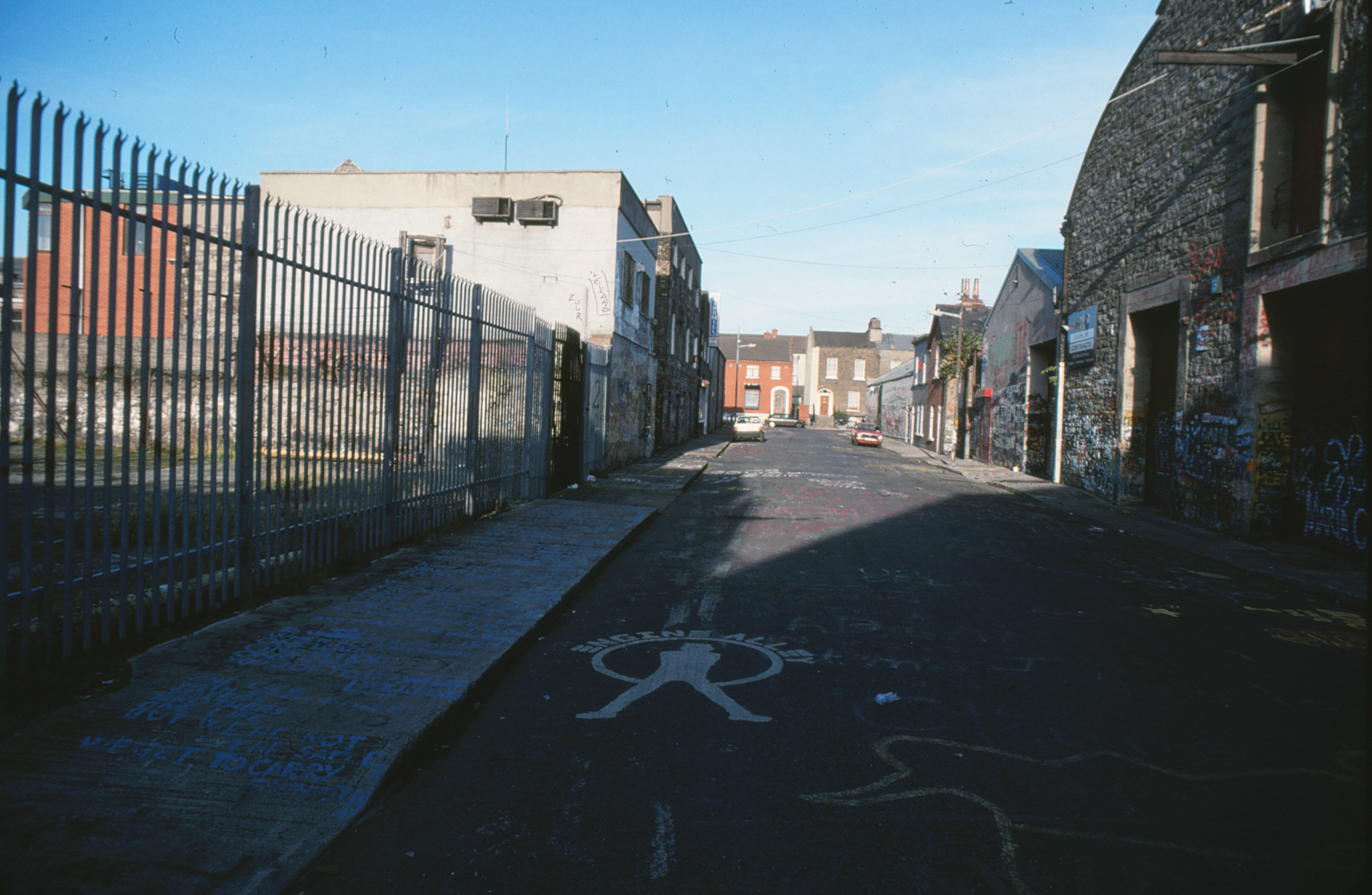
Windmill Lane in Dublin in September 1994. The studios are on the left. On the near left, a fan has written out in blue on the pavement the lyrics to the U2 song "One".

Following the move, the Windmill Lane building continued to house various post-production facilities. These included Windmill Lane Pictures (a video post-production facility), incorporating Number 4 (an audio post-production facility), Trend Studios (audio mastering), and a number of other related services.

The original studio buildings were covered in graffiti from fans, who had made a pilgrimage from all over the world—many attracted by the studio's historical connection with U2. The original location of the studios was recommended as a tourist attraction by publications such as The New York Times in 2008.

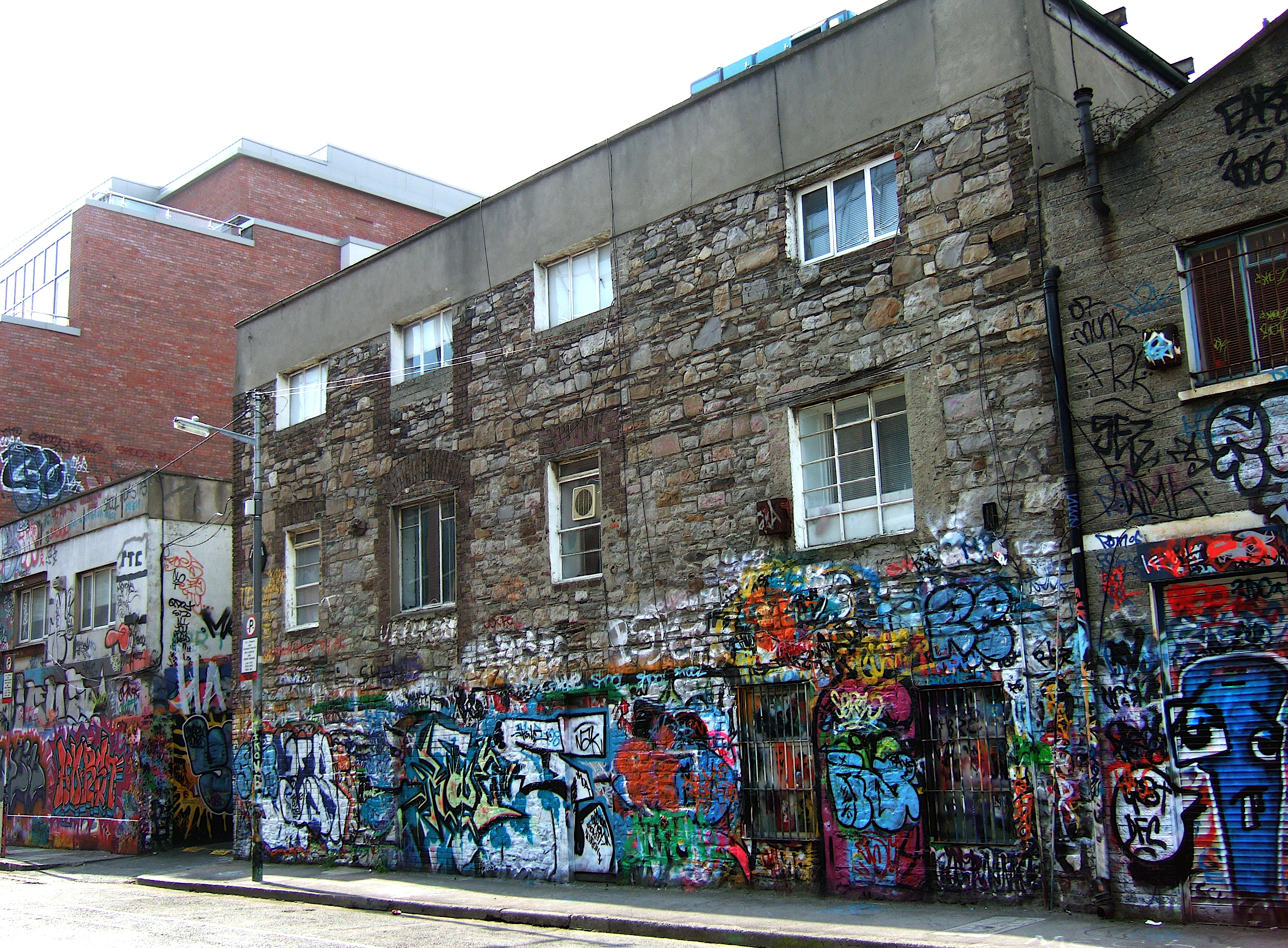
Windmill Lane Studios was known for its graffiti, here seen in 2008.

Plans to construct a six-storey office block on the old site led to criticism from local resident groups in early September 2008.

The Windmill Lane site was then bought by property investment company Hibernia REIT in 2015, who announced in 2014 that it had purchased the loans held against the Hanover Building on Windmill Lane, Dublin, for €20.16 million and an adjoining one-acre development site for €7.5 million. A plan was made to develop it into offices, retail spaces, and residential units.

The original Windmill Lane Studios structure was demolished on 3 April 2015 by Hibernia REIT, with the exception of Open Gallery 3 where U2 recorded. The firm announced plans to retain a 20-metre stretch of the studio wall famous for its fan graffiti. Options for the future of the wall include recreating it in the atrium of the new Windmill Lane building, giving the wall to Dublin City Council, U2, or any other interested party for reconstruction or reuse in an alternative setting. Another possibility is donating the wall to a charity so that they can auction pieces of it to U2 fans around the world.

== History of current location ==
In 1990, Windmill Lane Recording Studios relocated from its original site on Windmill Lane to its current location on Ringsend Road, Dublin 4.

Orchestras regularly record at Windmill Lane Recording Studios, as Studio One is the only recording space in Ireland that can accommodate an 80-piece orchestra apart from Raidió Teilifís Éireann. The scores to many movies have been recorded there: Mission Impossible, Sing Street, A Room with a View, The Remains of the Day, The Mask, The Tailor of Panama, The Grifters and My Left Foot (both by Elmer Bernstein), In America, and A River Runs Through It.

Studio Two has been the venue for recording number-one albums by Gabrielle, Kylie Minogue, and The Spice Girls.

The studio remained empty from 2006 onwards, although reports circulated which linked Van Morrison with purchasing the studio for his own personal use that August. Morrison had previously recorded several albums there, including Back on Top, Magic Time, and Pay the Devil. In January 2008 the studio was used to record "The Ballad of Ronnie Drew".

In 2009, Naomi Moore, Aidan Alcock, and Tony Perrey took over Windmill Lane and updated the studios.

In mid-February 2012, the studio issued an appeal to artists who recorded there to collect their master tapes, stating they will otherwise be destroyed. The studio noted the tapes, numbering over 1,000 and weighing a tonne, were recorded before digital technology and were both deteriorating and taking up valuable space. Subsequently all tapes owned by Island Records were recovered by the label.

On 20 February 2020, the studio launched a visitor experience.
