= My Lagan Love =

Song to a traditional Irish air, found in County Donegal

"My Lagan Love" (Roud 1418) is a song to a traditional Irish air, first collected in 1903 in northern County Donegal.

The English lyrics have been credited to Joseph Campbell (1879–1944), also known as Seosamh MacCathmhaoil and Joseph McCahill, among others). Campbell was a Belfast man whose grandparents came from the Irish-speaking area of Flurrybridge, South Armagh. He started collecting songs in County Antrim. In 1904, he began a collaboration with composer Herbert Hughes. Together, they collected traditional airs from the remote parts of County Donegal.

While on holidays in Donegal, Hughes had learned the air from Proinseas mac Suibhne, who had learned it from his father Seaghan mac Suibhne, who in turn had learned it fifty years previously from a man working with the Ordnance Survey of Ireland. Campbell said that mac Suibhne knew the tune under the title of "The Belfast Maid", but did not know the words. A song by this title was published in various early 19th century broadsides, with the first lines "In Belfast town of high renown / There lives a comely maid". This ballad now has Roud number 2930.

The Lagan referred to in the title most likely is the River Lagan in Belfast. Campbell's words mention Lambeg, which is just outside the city. The Lagan is the river that runs through Belfast. However, some argue that the Lagan in the song refers to a stream that empties into Lough Swilly in County Donegal, not far from where Herbert Hughes collected the song.

The song was arranged in a classical style by Hamilton Harty; this was used by Mary O'Hara and Charlotte Church.

== Performances ==
- 1910: John McCormack
- 1953: Margaret Barry on I Sang Through the Fairs (The Alan Lomax Portrait Series)
- 1958: Liam Devally on Irish Songs EP Delysé
- 1967: Dusty Springfield on her BBCTV series.
- 1968: Emmet Spiceland on The First
- 1969: Esther Ofarim on Dieter Finnern show, Berlin
- 1976: Horslips on The Book of Invasions: A Celtic Symphony (instrumental)
- 1977: Bob McGrath on Sleepytime Bird
- 1983: Phil Coulter on Classic Tranquility
- 1985: Kate Bush, bonus material on a 1997 re-release of Hounds of Love with lyrics written by John Carder Bush, Kate's brother
- 1987: Vermilion Sands on Water Blue
- 1987: Capercaillie on Crosswinds as "My Laggan Love/Fox on the Town" (instrumental)
- 1988: Van Morrison and The Chieftains on Irish Heartbeat
- 1990: Meg Davis on The Claddagh Walk
- 1994: Jean Redpath on Jean Redpath
- 1994: Barbara Dickson on Parcel of Rogues
- 1995: Brendan Power on "New Irish Harmonica" as "My Lagan Love"
- 1995: Caroline Lavelle on Spirit as "Lagan Love"
- 1996: Jim McCann on Grace and Other Love Songs
- 1997: James Galway and Phil Coulter on "Legends"
- 1998: Charlotte Church on Voice of an Angel
- 1998: Pentangle on Passe Avant
- 1999: Sheila Chandra on Moonsung as "Lagan Love/Nada Brahma"
- 1999: Carol Noonan on her recording Self-Titled as "Lagan Love"
- 2002: Sinéad O'Connor on Sean-Nós Nua
- 2003: Anuna on Invocation
- 2004: Sharon Knight on Song of the Sea
- 2005: The Corrs on Home
- 2009: Celtic Woman on Celtic Woman: Songs from the Heart
- 2010: Fionnuala Sherry on Songs From Before
- 2011: Celtic Thunder on Storm
- 2011: Lone Raven/Kara Markley on Flight to the Hinterlands
- 2011: Hayley Griffiths on Celtic Rose
- 2012: Lisa Hannigan and The Chieftains on The Chieftains: Voice of Ages
- 2012: Niopha Keegan on lead vocals with The Unthanks on The Unthanks with Brighouse and Rastrick Brass Band
- 2012: Karnataka on New Light
- 2012: Voces8 on "In the Beginning" as "My Lagen Love/She Moved Through the Fair"
- 2015: TradArrr on "Cautionary Tales" as "My Lagan Love"
- 2015: Colm Mac Con Iomaire featuring Marketa Irglove English Dare to be Wild film soundtrack
- 2018: Mary Coughlan on the Cúl An Tí DVD (where she sings Gabriel Rosenstock's Gaelic translation with Kíla accompanying)
- 2020: The Haar on their eponymous debut album The Haar
- 2021: Hozier on Series 19 of RTE2's Other Voices
- 2026: Beth Taylor and Hamish Brown on The Deeps Have Music
