= The Táin (Horslips album) =

Studio album by Horslips
- Released: 1973
- Recorded: November 23, 1973
- Studio: Escape Studios / Manor Studios. Mixed at Olympic Studios
- Genres: Celtic rock, progressive rock
- Length: 42:39
- Labels: LP - Horslips Records (Ireland), RCA (UK), Atco (U.S.). CD - Edsel (UK).
- Producers: Alan O'Duffy, Horslips

Horslips chronology
Happy to Meet - Sorry to Part (1972)	The Táin (1973)	Dancehall Sweethearts (1974)

The Táin is an album by Irish rock band Horslips. Their second studio album, it was the band's first attempt at making a concept album, an idea they would return to in 1976 with The Book of Invasions: A Celtic Symphony. The Táin was based on the Táin Bó Cúailnge (The Cattle Raid of Cooley), one of the most famous legends of early Irish literature, dealing with the war between Ulster and Connacht over a prize bull. The songs tell the story from the points of view of Cú Chulainn, Queen Maeve of Connacht and Ferdia, among others. Horslips continued their Celtic Rock style of fusing traditional Irish music and rock, using traditional jigs and reels and incorporating them into their songs. For example, "Dearg Doom" is based on O'Neill's March, while The March of the King of Laois forms part of "More Than You Can Chew".

== Release ==
The Táin was released in Ireland in 1973 independently, in the UK by RCA/Oats and by Atco in the US. It was reissued in the UK in 1978 by DJM.

== Legacy ==
"Dearg Doom" was arguably the most popular track on the album and was included in Tom Dunne's 30 Best Irish Hits compilation, released in 2003. Along with "Faster Than The Hound", it was performed by the band on the BBC's The Old Grey Whistle Test. The track's main guitar riff was incorporated into "Put 'Em Under Pressure", the anthem of the Republic of Ireland's Italia '90 campaign, reintroducing the song to a younger audience.

Professional ratings
Review scores
Source	Rating
AllMusic	4.5/5 stars

== Track listing ==
Side one
No.	Title	Length
1.	"Setanta"	1:15
2.	"Maeve's Court"	1:41
3.	"Charolais"	4:03
4.	"The March"	1:34
5.	"You Can't Fool the Beast"	3:43
6.	"Dearg Doom"	3:07
7.	"Ferdia's Song"	2:44
8.	"Gae Bolga"	1:15

Side two
No.	Title	Length
1.	"Cú Chulainn's Lament"	3:07
2.	"Faster Than the Hound"	5:39
3.	"Silver Spear"	2:06
4.	"More Than You Can Chew"	3:18
5.	"The Morrigan's Dream"	3:25
6.	"Time to Kill!"	5:02

== Personnel ==
Horslips

- Jim Lockhart – keyboards, flute, tin whistles, uilleann pipes, backing vocals
- Eamon Carr – drums, bodhrán, percussions
- Barry Devlin – bass guitar, lead vocals on "Charolais", "You Can't Fool the Beast", "Ferdia's Song", and "Faster than The Hound", backing vocals
- Charles O'Connor – fiddle, mandolin, concertina, lead vocals on "Dearg Doom", "Cú Chulainn's Lament", and "More than You Can Chew", backing vocals
- John Fean – guitars, banjo, lead vocals on "Time to Kill", backing vocals

== Sources ==
- Horslips official site - Gives lyrics, meanings of songs, as well as a guide to the album's backstory, the legendary Táin Bó Cuailgne.
