= Dancehall Sweethearts =

Studio album by Horslips
- Released: October 1974
- Recorded: Rockfield Studios, Wales. Mixed at Kingsway Recorders, London. June, 1974.
- Genres: Celtic rock, progressive rock
- Length: 43:27
- Labels: Oats (Ireland), RCA (UK, USA, Germany)
- Producer: Fritz Fryer

Horslips chronology
The Táin (1973)	Dancehall Sweethearts (1974)	The Unfortunate Cup of Tea (1975)

Dancehall Sweethearts is the third studio album by Irish rock band Horslips. Recorded during the 1974 World Cup Finals, the songs were loosely based on the travels of the famed 18th century blind harper, Turlough O' Carolan. The title and cover were chosen by the band in reaction to the record company's worry that an album about a deceased blind Irish harper would not sell in great quantities.

For this album, the addition of brass sections added a new element to Horslips' sound, as songs like Nighttown Boy and Sunburst displayed elements of blues which were new to Horslips' Celtic Rock sound. Once again, traditional jigs and reels were incorporated into Horslips' songs. A video was recorded for Ireland's national broadcaster, RTÉ, of Horslips performing King of the Fairies, a set dance, Beatles-style on the roof of Bank of Ireland's headquarters in 1975.

== Track listing ==
Side one

1. "Nighttown Boy" – 5:08
2. "The Blind Can't Lead the Blind" – 5:20
3. "Stars" – 5:03
4. "We Bring the Summer with Us" (instrumental) – 2:32
5. "Sunburst" – 3:31

Side two

1. "Mad Pat" – 6:17
2. "Blindman" – 3:33
3. "King of the Fairies" (instrumental) – 4:40
4. "Lonely Hearts" – 5:34
5. "The Best Years of My Life" – 1:49

== Personnel ==
Horslips

- Barry Devlin - bass, vocals
- Johnny Fean - guitar, banjo, vocals
- Jim Lockhart - keyboards, flute, tin whistle, vocals
- Eamon Carr - drums, bodhrán, percussions
- Charles O'Connor - fiddle, mandolin, concertina, vocals

Technical

- Fritz Fryer - producer, engineer
- George Sloan - engineer
- Paul Watkins - assistant engineer
- Ray Russell - brass arrangements
- Ian Finlay - photography
