= Polly Devlin =

Irish writer and broadcaster

Polly Devlin OBE
- Born: 1944 (age 81–82); Ardboe, County Tyrone, Northern Ireland
- Citizenship: Irish
- Occupations: Writer, broadcaster
- Spouse: Andy Garnett (m. 1967)
- Children: 3
- Relatives: Barry Devlin Bay Garnett. Marie Heaney. Seamus Heaney Rose Garnett Daisy Garnett Tom Craig Nicholas Pearson Claire Devlin. Helen Harvey. Val Devlin Tom Browne Tom Fisher
- Writing career
- Language: English

Polly Devlin OBE (born 1944) is a Northern Irish writer and broadcaster.

== Biography ==
She was born in Ardboe, County Tyrone, Northern Ireland, then a remote area without telephones or electricity. She left for London after winning the Vogue magazine Talent competition, working there as Features Editor.

She also wrote a column for the New Statesman and she had her own page in the Evening Standard a year later. She moved to Manhattan in 1967 becoming a features editor and writer for Diana Vreeland on American Vogue. She reviewed theatre and film and interviewed Barbra Streisand, Janis Joplin, John Lennon, John Osborne, Bob Dylan and Andy Warhol among many others. When she moved back to England, she attended the National Film School for four years and directed a one-hour documentary The Daisy Chain. She also wrote for The Observer, The Sunday Times, Vogue, and many other newspapers and magazines.

She has been a Booker Prize judge (1984), Irish Times Literary Award judge (1994), Pushkin Prize judge (1998) and was awarded the OBE for Services to Literature in the 1992 Birthday Honours.

She currently writes a column for The Big Issue and is adjunct professor at Barnard College Columbia University, New York teaching creative non-fiction. She is also Northern Ireland panel member on BBC Radio 4 Round Britain Quiz

She has five sisters and one brother, Barry Devlin who is bass player and vocalist in the Irish Celtic rock band Horslips. Her sister Marie is an editor and writer (Over Nine Waves, a collection of Irish myths and legends) who married the Nobel Laureate Seamus Heaney. In 1967 Polly married Andy Garnett an industrialist, philanthropist and writer of books including Steel Wheels, A Social History of Railways and Lucky Dog, a memoir. Together they had three daughters Rose Garnett, Head of Development at Film 4, Daisy Garnett writer and journalist and Bay Garnett fashion stylist, author and editor.

== Books ==
- All of us There a social history. Many re-prints. Latest Virago Modern Classics
- The Far side of the Lough Short stories. Re-published O'Brien Press 1999
- Vogue Book of Fashion Photography. Thames and Hudson. 1979
- Dora or the Shifts of the Heart a novel pub 1993 Chatto and Windus. Serialised for 13 weeks on Radio 4
- Dublin a Guide Book 1996
- Only Sometimes Looking Sideways A Book of Essays. O'Brien Press 1998
- A Year in the Life of an English Meadow Frances Lincoln 2007
- A Guide to Ceramics for the National Gallery Ireland

New York: Places to Write Home About Pimpernel Press 2017 New York:Behind Closed Doors: Gibbs-Smith. USA 2017

- Writing Home Essays. 2019
- Film: The Daisy Chain A documentary film: director and writer.
- Radio Play: The Hiring Fair
