= Album cover =

Design on an album's front cover

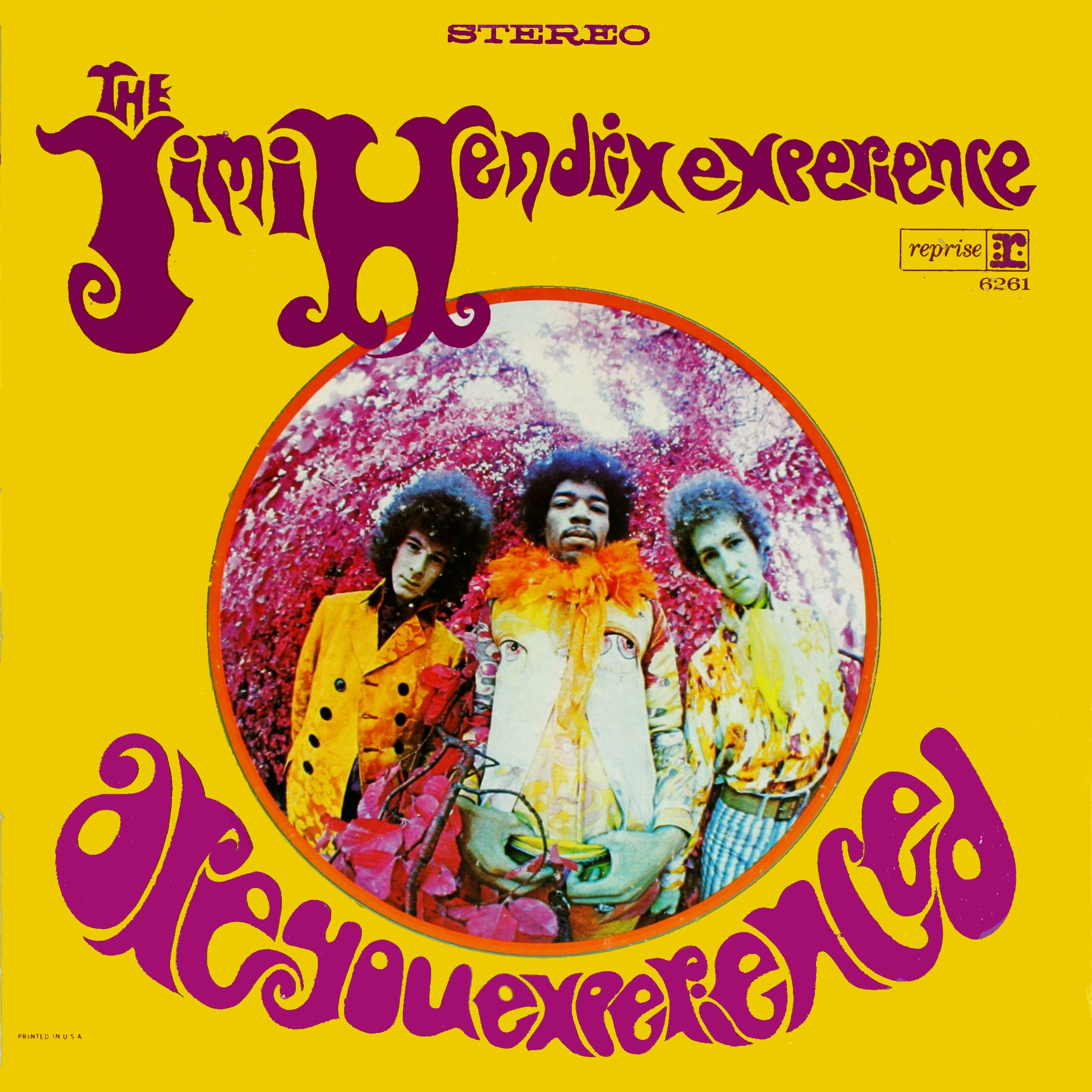
The album cover for Are You Experienced (1967) by the Jimi Hendrix Experience

An album cover (also referred to as album art) is the front packaging art of a commercially released studio album or other audio recordings. The term can refer to:

- the printed paperboard covers typically used to package:
  - sets of 10 in (25 cm) and 12 in (30 cm) 78 rpm records
  - singles and sets of 12 in (30 cm) long-play records
  - sets of 45 rpm records (either in several connected sleeves or a box)
- the front-facing panel of:
  - a cassette J-card
  - a CD package
- the primary image accompanying a digital download of the album (or of its individual tracks).

For all tangible records, the album art also serves as a part of the protective sleeve.

== Early history ==
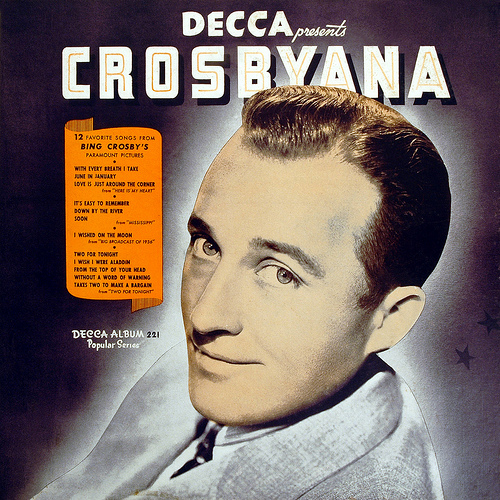
Cover for Bing Crosby's 1941 compilation album Crosbyana issued on six 78 records

Around 1909, 78 rpm records replaced the phonograph cylinder as the medium for recorded sound. The 78 rpm records were issued in both 11- and 12-inch-diameter sizes and were usually sold separately, in brown paper or cardboard sleeves that were sometimes plain and sometimes printed to show the producer or the retailer's name. These were invariably made out of acidic paper, limiting conservability. Generally the sleeves had a circular cutout allowing the record label to be seen. Records could be laid on a shelf horizontally or stood upright on an edge, but because of their fragility, many broke in storage.

German record company Odeon pioneered the "album" in 1909 when it released the Nutcracker Suite by Tchaikovsky on four double-sided discs in a specially designed package. (It is not indicated what the specially designed package was.) The practice of issuing albums does not seem to have been taken up by other record companies for many years.

Beginning in the 1920s, bound collections of empty sleeves with a plain paperboard or leather cover were sold as "record albums" (similar to a photograph album) that customers could use to store their records. (The name "record album" was printed on some covers.) These empty albums were sold in both 10- and 12-inch sizes. The covers of these bound books were wider and taller than the records inside, allowing the record album to be placed on a shelf upright, like a book, and suspending the fragile records above the shelf, protecting them.

Starting in the 1930s, record companies began issuing collections of 78 rpm records by one performer or of one type of music in specially assembled collections. These albums of several 78 rpm records could include a collection of popular songs related by either performer or style, or extended-length classical music, including complete symphonies.

In 1938, Columbia Records hired Alex Steinweiss as its first art director. He is credited with inventing the concept of album covers and cover art, replacing the plain covers used before. After his initial efforts at Columbia, other record companies followed his lead. By the late 1940s, record albums for all the major companies featured their own colorful paper covers in both 10- and 12-inch sizes. Some featured reproductions of classic art while others utilized original designs.

When the 10- and 12-inch long-playing records (LPs) came along in 1948, and box sets of 45 rpm records soon followed (see gramophone record), the name "album" was used for the new format of collections, and the creation of artistic original album covers continued.

== Formats ==
From the 1950s through to the 1980s, the 12-inch LP record and the 45 rpm record became the major formats for the distribution of popular music. The LP format remains in use for new releases. The size of the typical cardboard LP sleeve cover is 12.375 in (31.43 cm) square.

Starting in the mid-1990s, the compact disc (CD) was the most common form of physically distributed music products. Packaging formats vary, including the jewel case (which since 1982 has been the most popular form of CD packaging), and the cardboard and plastic combination commonly known as a Digipak (which has been a popular alternative form of packaging in recent years, but remains supplanted by the jewel case due to higher manufacturing costs and lower durability). Typically the album cover component of these packages is approximately 4.75 in (12.1 cm) square.

In the 1980s and early 1990s, CDs were often sold as jewel cases enclosed within cardboard longboxes measuring 12 in (30 cm) by 6 in (15 cm), which provided more space for album artwork than the jewel cases they contained, but were seen as harmful to the environment since the cardboard box was typically discarded by the buyer soon after purchase. Major record labels in the United States stopped distributing CDs in longboxes as of April 1, 1993.

== Design ==
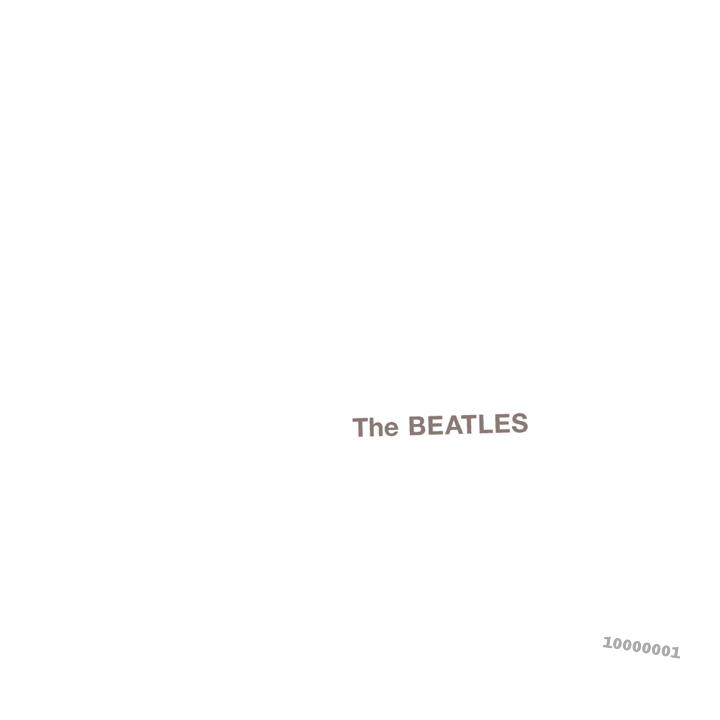
The cover for The Beatles, aka "The White Album", cited for its innovative design

Album covers are one of the various ways in which first impressions affect an audience's perception of a given musician or band, or other content of the album. Album covers' design cover may also add to how an audience forms an opinion of them and their music. There are various ways in which an album cover is visualized. Some examples include artists choosing to put a photo of themselves, which is one of the factors that add to the observation of the band, the musician, and the music.

The album cover eventually became an important part of the culture of music. Under the influence of designers like Bob Cato, who at various stages in his long music career was vice president of creative services at both Columbia Records and United Artists, album covers became renowned for being a marketing tool and an expression of artistic intent. Album art has also been discussed as an important postwar cultural expression.

During the early 1960s, the Beatles' With the Beatles, Bob Dylan's The Times They Are a-Changin' and the Rolling Stones' self-titled debut album each contained a cover photograph designed to further the musical artist's public image. Author Peter Doggett also highlights the cover of Otis Redding's Otis Blue, containing a photo of a young white woman, as a design that "played a dual role: she represented the transcendent power of the music, and obscured the race of its creator." The standard portrait-based LP cover was further challenged over 1965–66 by Dylan's Bringing It All Back Home, through the inclusion of symbolic artefacts around the singer; the artificially stretched faces of the Beatles shown on their Rubber Soul album; and the darkened hues applied to the Rolling Stones on Aftermath.

Gatefold covers (a folded double cover) and inserts, often with lyric sheets, made the album cover a desirable work in its own right. Notable examples are the Beatles' Sgt. Pepper's Lonely Hearts Club Band, which had cut-out inserts, printed lyrics, and a gatefold sleeve, even though it was a single album; the Rolling Stones' Exile on Main Street, which had a gatefold and a series of 12 perforated postcards as inserts (taken by photographer Norman Seeff); and Pink Floyd's The Dark Side of the Moon, which had a gatefold, lyrics, no title on the sleeve, and poster and sticker inserts. The Band's 1970 release Stage Fright, which included a photograph by Seeff as a poster insert, is an early example of LP artwork quickly becoming a collector's item. The move to the small (less than 1/4 the size of a record) CD format lost that impact, although attempts have been made to create a more desirable packaging for the CD format, for example the reissue of Sgt. Pepper, which had a cardboard box and booklet, or the use of oversized packaging.

The importance of design was such that some cover artists specialised or gained fame through their work. Such people include the design team Hipgnosis, through their work on Pink Floyd albums and others; Roger Dean, famous for his Yes and Greenslade covers; Cal Schenkel, for Captain Beefheart's Trout Mask Replica and Frank Zappa's We're Only in It for the Money.

The talents of many photographers and illustrators from both inside and outside of the music industry have been used to produce a vast array of LP/CD covers. Photographer Mick Rock produced some of the most iconographic album covers of the 1970s, including Queen's Queen II (recreated for their classic music video "Bohemian Rhapsody"), Syd Barrett's The Madcap Laughs, and Lou Reed's Transformer. From 1972 to 1975, photographer Norman Seeff was creative director at United Artists and in addition to his many cover photographs (The Band, Kiss's Hotter than Hell, Joni Mitchell's Hejira, etc.), he art directed dozens of album covers including Exile on Main Street, many of which received Grammy Award nominations. In addition to the examples mentioned previously, a number of graphic artists and illustrators such as Robert Crumb (Big Brother & the Holding Company), Shepard Fairey (Johnny Cash), Howard Finster (R.E.M., Talking Heads), Frank Frazetta (Molly Hatchet), Derek Riggs (Iron Maiden), H. R. Giger (Emerson, Lake & Palmer, Debbie Harry), Gottfried Helnwein (Marilyn Manson), Al Hirschfeld (Aerosmith), Ken Kelly (Kiss, Mati Klarwein, Santana, Miles Davis), Rex Ray (David Bowie), Jamie Reid (The Sex Pistols), Ed Repka (Megadeth), Norman Rockwell (Mike Bloomfield and Al Kooper), John Van Hamersveld (The Rolling Stones), Alberto Vargas (The Cars), and Andy Warhol (The Velvet Underground, The Rolling Stones) have all applied their talents to music packages.

A number of record covers have also used images licensed (or borrowed from the public domain) from artists of bygone eras. Well-known examples of this include the cover of Derek and the Dominos' Layla and Other Assorted Love Songs (from the painting "La Fille au Bouquet" by French painter and sculptor Émile Théodore Frandsen de Schomberg), "The Downfall of Icarus" by Genisson on the cover of the first album by Renaissance; Bosch on the cover of Deep Purple; Breugel on the cover of Fleet Foxes; the cover of Kansas's debut album, adapted from a mural by painter John Steuart Curry, Norman Rockwell's cowboy (Pure Prairie League), and Coldplay's Viva la Vida, which features Eugène Delacroix's painting Liberty Leading the People (a favorite in The Louvre) with the words "VIVA LA VIDA" brushed on top in white paint.

Legends from photography and video/film who have also produced record cover images include Drew Struzan (Black Sabbath, Alice Cooper, Iron Butterfly, The Beach Boys and others), Annie Leibovitz (John Lennon, Bruce Springsteen, Patti Smith), Richard Avedon (Whitney Houston, Teddy Pendergrass), David LaChappelle (No Doubt, Elton John), Anton Corbijn (U2, The Killers, Depeche Mode), Karl Ferris (Jimi Hendrix, Donovan, The Hollies), Robert Mapplethorpe (Patti Smith, Peter Gabriel) and Francesco Scavullo (Diana Ross, Edgar Winter), David Michael Kennedy others.

A number of artists and bands feature members who are, in their own right, accomplished illustrators, designers and photographers and whose talents are exhibited in the artwork they produced for their own recordings. Examples include Jimmy Page (Led Zeppelin IV), Chris Mars (Replacements' Pleased to Meet Me and others), Marilyn Manson (Lest We Forget...), Michael Stipe (R.E.M.'s Accelerate), Thom Yorke (credited as "Tchocky" on misc. Radiohead records), Michael Brecker (Ringorama), Freddie Mercury (Queen I), Lynsey De Paul (Surprise), John Entwistle (Who By Numbers), Graham Coxon (13 and most solo albums), Mike Shinoda (various Linkin Park albums), Joni Mitchell (Miles of Aisles and several others) as well for Crosby, Stills, Nash & Young (So Far), and M.I.A. (credited variously on Elastica's The Menace, her records), and Captain Beefheart, 'Mona Bone Jakon', 'Tea for the Tillerman' and 'Teaser and the Firecat' by Cat Stevens, Mika (all albums released to date), Music from Big Pink (for The Band), Self Portrait and Planet Waves by Bob Dylan, Walls and Bridges by John Lennon.

A genre of music that people have found issues in album covers is reggae. There are certain reggae artists that feel that the way they are displayed on their own album covers is not an accurate way of describing themselves and their culture. The stereotypical rasta lifestyle depicted on many reggae album covers is only displayed that way because this is what the white audience seemed to appreciate the most. This version of the reggae artists is what many people take notice of and what makes them unique in regards to other genres. However, these album covers do not accurately represent the core values of typical people in Jamaica but they deal with this representation because they know that the audience is familiar with the stereotypical rasta depiction. These album covers tend to display inauthentic versions of their considerations of style and sexuality and do not accurately display "Uptown" Jamaica.

Album cover art was the subject of a 2011 documentary film, The Cover Story: Album Art, by Eric Christensen, a San Francisco Bay Area record collector.

The physical design of album covers has been the subject of creative innovation. Ogden's Nut Gone Flake by the Small Faces was originally in a circular metal tin, and Happy to Meet – Sorry to Part by Horslips was in an octagonal package. Anyway by Family was originally issued in an opaque plastic package through which a design (a Leonardo sketch) could be seen. Magical Mystery Tour by the Beatles was first released as a double EP with a booklet between the records. Sgt. Pepper contained a cardboard sheet of images, and The Beatles (often referred to as the White Album) contained four large glossy photos of the individual Beatles along with a poster-sized collage. Live at Leeds by The Who also contained a generous supply of posters and printed material. Led Zeppelin III had a front cover that contained a revolving disc which brought different images into view through small cut-outs in the outer sleeve. A similar effect was used for the band's later album Physical Graffiti with cut-outs of the windows of a brownstone building. The original issue of Sticky Fingers by the Rolling Stones had an actual zipper incorporated into the picture of the crotch area of a pair of jeans. The Velvet Underground and Nico album had a Warhol-designed cardboard banana on the cover that could be peeled back. The record company Vertigo had a black-and-white design on the centre label that produced a hypnotic optical effect when the disc revolved on the turntable.

== Packaging ==
The album cover is a component of the overall packaging of an album. These could be done in a single or a multiple (gatefold) sleeve. Especially in the case of vinyl records with paperboard sleeves, these packages are prone to wear and tear, although wear and tear does often take place to some degree on covers contained within plastic cases. A variety of treatments could be applied to improve both their appearance and durability, such as clear plastic wrap. Many products have been available for the storage of vinyl albums, often clear plastic sleeves.

The surface of a vinyl record is readily damaged, so aside from the outer paperboard sleeve, there is usually an inner protective cover to protect against dust and handling. This is normally shaped to allow it to readily slide within the outer cover. The inner sleeve is either thin white paper, either plain or printed with information on other recordings available from the same company, or a paper sleeve supporting a thin plastic bag. These quite often have a circular cut out so that the record label can be read without directly handling the record, though when the inner sleeve is printed with lyrics, which became quite common, then there is usually no hole. Decca Records used a system of colour-coding on these sleeves where a blue color denoted a stereophonic recording while red denoted a monophonic recording (the mono record players of the time were not always compatible with stereo records). This system was begun in the 1960s to reduce packaging costs.

Packaging formats for compact discs widened the variety of presentations as well, even as the size of the CD meant that album covers were no longer so large.

Besides the practicalities of identifying specific records, album covers serve the purpose of advertising the musical contents on the LP, through the use of graphic design, photography, and/or illustration. An album cover normally has the artist's name, sometimes in logo form; and the album title. Occasionally, though more common on historical vinyl records, the cover may include a reference number; a branding (the label), and possibly a track listing. Other information is seldom included on the cover, and is usually contained on the rear or interior of the packaging, such as a track listing together with a more detailed list of those involved in making the record, band members, guest performers, engineers and producer. On the spine of the package, the artist, title, and reference number are usually repeated so that albums can be identified while tightly packed on a shelf.

Parental advisory labels are warning labels that are required to be placed on album covers when the music on the album contains explicit content such as vulgar language. These labels have been known to be controversial when it comes to keeping underage audiences from this content. There are a few different theories on this, such as the "forbidden fruit" and "tainted fruit" theories. The "forbidden fruit" theory states that when a child sees the parental advisory label on an album cover they will be more likely to listen to it because there is an increased attractiveness to the music. There are many adolescents that follow the "forbidden fruit" theory as a way to either lash out at their parents or to make themselves feel more mature than they are. They may use explicit music as a way to be rebellious and to appear cooler to their friends, even if they are much too young to be exposed to that kind of music. The "tainted fruit" theory states that the child will see the label and immediately know to avoid this kind of content because it is inappropriate for their age. These children are the ones who see the label and do not even acknowledge this album or these songs because they know that it is not made for them. The Recording Industry Association of America (RIAA) introduced this warning label and it is now a requirement on any explicit music. However, the RIAA is unable to actually control whether or not adolescents will be listening to the music but as of now there is no way to fully control what these children are doing.

== Album covers in the age of downloads and streaming ==
In August 2008, album cover designer Peter Saville suggested that the album cover was dead. Album art is still considered a vital part of the listening experience to many.

MP3, WMA, and M4A (Apple format) music files can contain embedded digital album artworks (called cover images or simply covers) in jpeg format. One digital solution is the iTunes LP format for interactive album artwork introduced by Apple in 2009. Resolution for digital album covers should be at least 800×800 (1:1 aspect ratio); lower resolutions might not look good on newer devices.

Some artists have used Internet technology to generate even more cover art. For instance, Nine Inch Nails initially released its album The Slip as a free download on the band's website, attaching separate but thematically connected images to each individual track.

== Controversial covers ==
Some album covers have been banned due to depicting violence, nudity, religious or other offensive imagery. For instance, Guns N' Roses's 1987 album Appetite for Destruction's original cover depicted a robot rapist about to be punished by a metal avenger, and Kanye West's 2010 album My Beautiful Dark Twisted Fantasy depicted West naked and being straddled by a phoenix with her bare breasts and buttocks showing. Other covers were controversial due to infringement of intellectual property or copyright.

== See also ==
- Book cover
- Liner notes
- Record sleeve
- Category:Album-cover and concert-poster artists
