= Biograph =

Biograph may refer to:

- Biograph Company, a motion picture company founded in 1895 and active until 1916
- An early form of the cinematograph, made by the Biograph Company
- Biograph girl, a nickname given to some early silent film actresses featured in films of the Biograph Company
- Biograph Studios, a studio facility and film laboratory complex built in 1912 by the Biograph Company in the Bronx, New York
- Biograph Theater, a historic Chicago movie theater
- Biograph Records, a record label founded in 1967 that specialized in American ragtime, jazz, and blues
- Biograph (album), a 1985 box set compiling music by Bob Dylan
- The Biograph, a former movie theatre in Washington, D.C.

== See also ==
- Biography (disambiguation)
