= Roll Back =

Studio album by Horslips
- Released: 26 November 2004
- Recorded: Grouse Lodge Studios in Horsleap, Co. Westmeath, August – September 2004
- Genres: Celtic rock, progressive rock
- Label: Horslips Records
- Producer: Horslips

Horslips chronology
Short Stories/Tall Tales (1979)	Roll Back (2004)

Professional ratings
Review scores
Source	Rating
Hot Press	4/5 stars
The Green Man Review	Positive
Exposé Online	Positive

Roll Back is an album by Irish rock band Horslips, their first since Short Stories/Tall Tales 25 years earlier. It is a collection of acoustic re-workings of various songs from the band's catalogue.

== Background ==
In March 2004, three Horslips enthusiasts, Jim Nelis, Stephen Ferris and Paul Callaghan, put on an exhibition of Horslips memorabilia in The Orchard Gallery in Derry. To open the exhibition, the Nelis, Ferris and Callaghan invited the five original members of the band to perform. The performance took place on March 20, to an audience of around 200 specially invited guests, where the band played a short set of acoustic versions of some of their better known songs.

Following the enthusiastic reception to the exhibition reunion, the band decided to reconvene again to record a couple of acoustic songs for the forthcoming documentary DVD Return of the Dancehall Sweethearts. These sessions eventually resulted in a full album of material, consisting of re-recorded versions of songs spanning the band's whole career, some of which were dramatically re-imagined.

== Track listing ==
No.	Title	Length
1.	"Trouble (With A Capital T)"	3:52
2.	"The Man Who Built America"	3:46
3.	"Guests of the Nation"	3:39
4.	"Faster Than the Hound"	4:12
5.	"Huish the Cat"	2:32
6.	"Mad Pat"	4:08
7.	"The Wrath of the Rain"	2:50
8.	"Flirting in the Shadows"	3:38
9.	"Cuchulainn's Lament"	3:51
10.	"Ace & Deuce"	2:04
11.	"Blindman"	2:44
12.	"Furniture"	3:21
13.	"The Power and the Glory"	3:12
14.	"Long Weekend"	4:08
15.	"My Love Is in America"	3:01

Enhanced Bonus CD: Music From An Exhibition (Live on March 20, 2004)
No.	Title	Length
1.	"Flower Among Them All"
2.	"Furniture"
3.	"The Musical Priest/The High Reel"
4.	"Trouble (With A Capital T)"
5.	"Bonus video selection"

== Personnel ==
Horslips

- Eamon Carr – drums, percussion
- Barry Devlin – bass guitar, vocals
- Johnny Fean – guitar, tenor guitar, slide guitar, tenor banjo, vocals
- Jim Lockhart – piano, keyboards, low whistle, vocals
- Charles O'Connor – guitar, tenor guitar, violin, mandolin, concertina, vocals

Guest musician

- Aisling Drury – cello on "Cuchulainn's Lament" and "Furniture"

Production

- Stefano Soffia, Ivan O'Shea – engineering
- Stefano Soffia – mixing
- Peter Mew – mastering
- Charles O'Connor, Chris Ellis – cover art
