= Biography (disambiguation) =

A biography is a genre of media based on the written accounts of individual lives.

Biography or biographic may also refer to:

== Music ==
- Biography (Lisa Stansfield album), a greatest hits collection from Lisa Stansfield
- Biography (Horslips album)
- A Biography, a John Mellencamp album

== Other uses ==
- Biography (TV program), a popular biographical sketch series on the A&E television network
  - The Biography Channel, a television network owned by A&E and inspired by the above program
  - Biography magazine, a monthly magazine that was part of the Biography franchise expansion
- Biography (journal), an interdisciplinary quarterly
- Biography (play), a 1932 play by S.N. Behrman
- Biographic (comics), started in 2005

== See also ==
- Biograph (disambiguation)
- Wikipedia:Biography of a living person
