= Rollback (disambiguation) =

Rollback, in political science, is the strategy of forcing a change in the major policies of a state.

Rollback or roll back may also refer to:

== Arts and entertainment ==
- Rollback (novel), by Robert J. Sawyer, 2007
- Roll Back, a 2004 album by Horslips

== Science and technology ==
- Rollback (data management), the operation of returning a database to some previous state
  - Rollback, in transaction processing
- Trench rollback, a geology term
- Rollback, a term used in Netcode

== Other uses ==
- Rollback (legislation), to repeal or reduce the effects of a specific law or regulation
- Rollback, the civil service salary reductions for constitutional deference known as a Saxbe fix
- Rollback, a form of flatbed tow truck

== See also ==
- Roll Back Malaria Partnership, at one time chaired by Tedros Adhanom Ghebreyesus
- Rollback attack, a form of cryptographic attack
- Reverse stock split, in finance
