= Bay Garnett =

British fashion stylist

- Education: University of Exeter
- Occupation: Fashion stylist
- Website: www.baygarnett.com

Bay Garnett is a British freelance fashion stylist, author, editor, creative director and advocate for sustainability in fashion. She has been credited with pioneering the use of second hand clothes.

She pioneered the idea of "thrifting", the art of shopping in second-hand stores, as being relevant to high fashion by including items she had found in magazine shoots. Garnett is the Senior Independent Fashion Advisor for Oxfam, and has led their runway shows during London Fashion Week in 2017 and 2019. This is part of the LFW schedule, and is uniquely styled by Garnett out of second-hand items donated to Oxfam. She also worked with Oxfam on 2019's Secondhand September campaign, with plans to repeat the initiative. Her thrift-inspired work is credited with having made its way into mainstream fashion. Published in 2016 and 2017 by IDEA Books, Garnett co-edited Fanpages: a collection of one page zines by different contributors, such as Beth Ditto, Chloë Sevigny and Louis Theroux. Garnett was appointed Contributing Fashion Editor at British Vogue 2002 – 2017, and then Fashion Director-at-Large of the Evening Standard magazine in 2017 until present. Garnett continues to work with Oxfam and in 2019 Garnett was the stylist and creative director for the first Second Hand September campaign which was launched starring Model Stella Tennant and her daughter Iris. This was followed in 2020 with actress, writer and director, Micheala Coel being the face of the campaign. Garnett then worked on the same campaign in 2021, starring actress Sienna Miller. The campaign has gone on to spark a national movement around sustainability in fashion.

In 2020 Garnett created Bay Garnett X Oxfam – a luxury Oxfam pop up shop in Selfridges – the first charity shop of its kind to exist in a department store, sitting in the same space as the luxury brands situated opposite Gucci and beside Prada – the shop was fitted out to look like a luxury shop meanwhile keeping the Oxfam price points.

In 2021 Garnett curated the second Oxfam pop up – Oxfam X Bay Garnett, this time on the 3rd floor at Selfridges. This pop up ran from September to December 2021, and includes different rails edited by different contributors including Chloë Sevigny and Neneh Cherry.

In November 2021, Garnett spoke on a panel at COP26 in Glasgow on a panel discussion on ways to decarbonise the fashion industry.

In 2023 Garnett released her book Style and Substance published by John Murray.

In September 2025 Garnett styled and was the creative director of "Style For Change" the Oxfam show featuring a diverse and eclectic mix of people walking. This show was viewed as a game changer for second hand fashion becoming mainstream.

In October 2025, Garnett sourced and curated The Village Attic X Smart Works charity shop at Bicester Village with all proceeds going to Smart Works Charity.

In November 2025 Garnett received TheIndustry Fashion People, Planet and Purpose Awards – Icon Hall of Fame Award for spearheading & pioneering the vintage fashion movement by bringing it into mainstream fashion & media.

== Background ==
She is the daughter of Andy Garnett and Polly Devlin. Her mother, who received an OBE for service for Literature, worked at both British and American Vogue and wrote the Vogue Book of Fashion Photography.

== Career ==
After studying art history and modern history at the University of Exeter, Garnett gained initial experience in galleries such as the Peggy Guggenheim Collection in Venice, Pace Wildenstein in New York and working for photographic agency Art Department.

In 1997, Garnett co-launched the New York version of underground, anti-fashion magazine Cheap Date, started in London in 1997 by Kira Jolliffe, which won them the title 'thrift pioneers', and proclaimed Garnett a spokesperson for second hand and vintage fashion. The magazine had contributors such as Anita Pallenberg, Chloë Sevigny, Liv Tyler and Debbie Harry. It ceased publication in 2005, but Bay Garnett went on to co-edit the 2007 book Cheap Date Guide to Style, a compilation from the magazine.

From 2002 to 2004, she was Style Director for British designer Matthew Williamson, and continues to be a Contributing Fashion Editor for British Vogue and a consultant to Louis Vuitton amongst other projects. In 2004, she designed a limited edition range for Topshop and consulted for the label Chloé. While there, the Bay bag was developed and became one of its most successful bags.

Garnett has collaborated with photographers including Juergen Teller, Bruce Webber, Craig McDean, Nick Knight and David LaChapelle. She also worked on a digital film for Louis Vuitton with Sam Taylor-Johnson. Her work has been featured in various publications and print advertising including British Vogue, Italian Vogue, V Man, 25 Magazine, Selfridges, Centrefold Magazine, Lula Magazine, Solange Azagury-Partridge, and Stylist.

In 2013, Garnett took part in a joint exhibition with her partner, photographer Tom Craig (photographer), at the Vogue Festival in London.

Garnett is the Senior Fashion Advisor for Oxfam, and has led their runway shows during London Fashion Week in 2017 and 2019. This is part of the LFW schedule, and is uniquely styled by Garnett out of purely second-hand items donated to Oxfam. She also works with Oxfam on their Secondhand September campaigns.

== Publications ==
- Garnett, Bay (with Kira Jolliffe) (2008). The Cheap Date Guide to Style. New York: Universe. pp. 128 pages. ISBN 978-0789316936.

== See also ==
- Diana Chire
- Jefferson Hack
- Sarah Lucas
