= Occasion at the Castle =

- Poster for the 1982 Occasion at the Castle
- Status: Defunct
- Genre: Music Festival
- Locations: Rehins Estate, Castlebar, County Mayo, Ireland
- Years active: 1981 to 1982
- Founder: Tommy Staunton; John Staunton; Tony McHugh
- Attendance: Approximately 13,000 each year
- Budget: 1981: Approximately £150,000; 1982: Approximately £250,000

Occasion at the Castle was a music festival held in 1981 and 1982 at Castlebar, County Mayo, Ireland. Staged on the grounds of the Raheens estate, just outside the town, the event was an ambitious attempt to bring major rock and pop acts to the west of Ireland. Inspired by the success of the inaugural event, organisers expanded in 1982 with a larger budget, a high-profile lineup including Thin Lizzy and Madness, and a wide array of facilities designed to attract a national audience. However, despite these efforts, attendance plateaued, and the festival incurred financial losses. A contemporary RTÉ report suggested that the market had become oversaturated, with new festivals springing up across Ireland despite an ongoing recession in the country. Combined with competition from The Rolling Stones at Slane, Occasion at the Castle struggled to maintain momentum and was quietly discontinued after 1982.

== 1981 ==
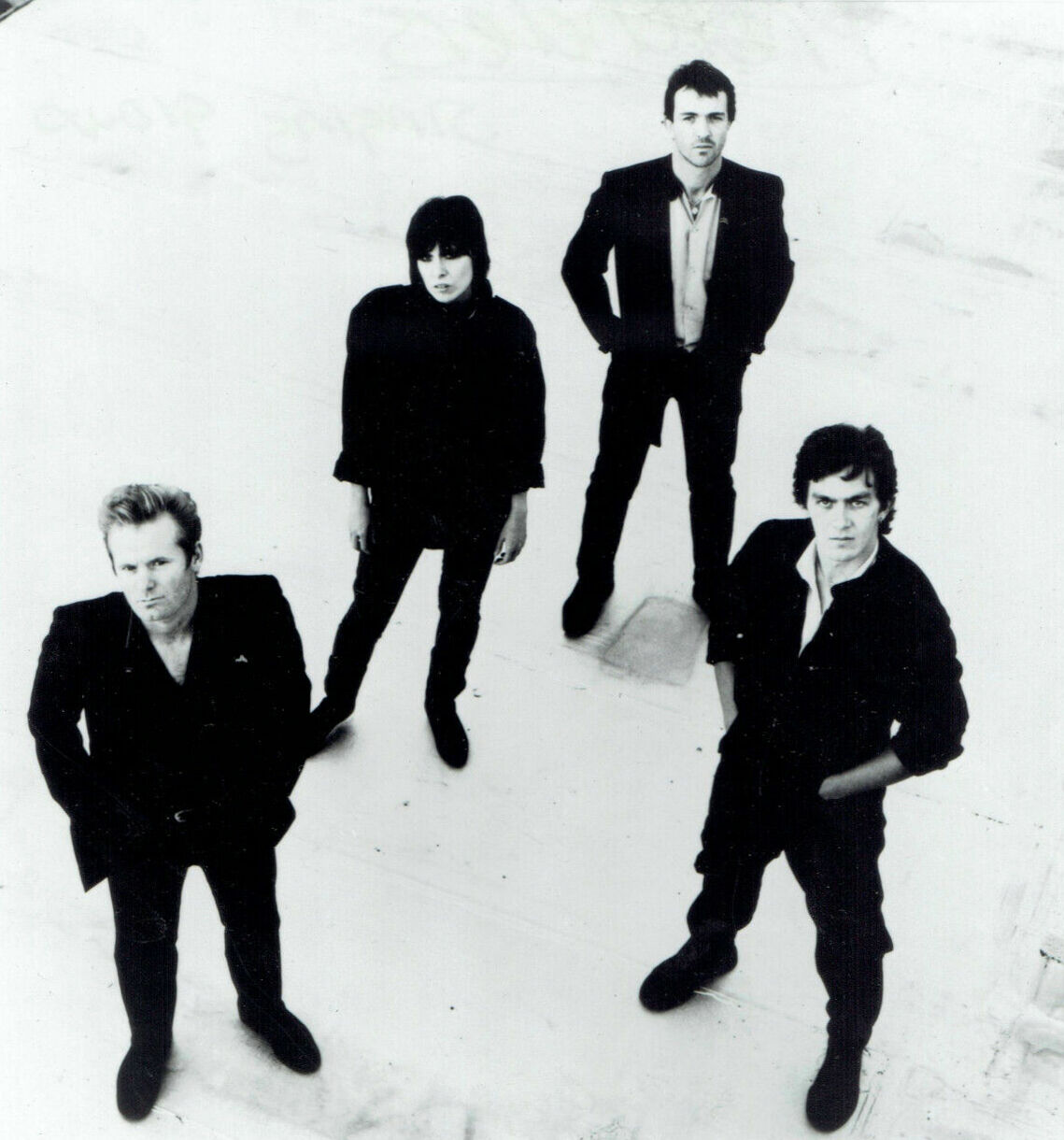
The Pretenders, seen here in this 1984 publicity image, headlined the first night of the 1981 event

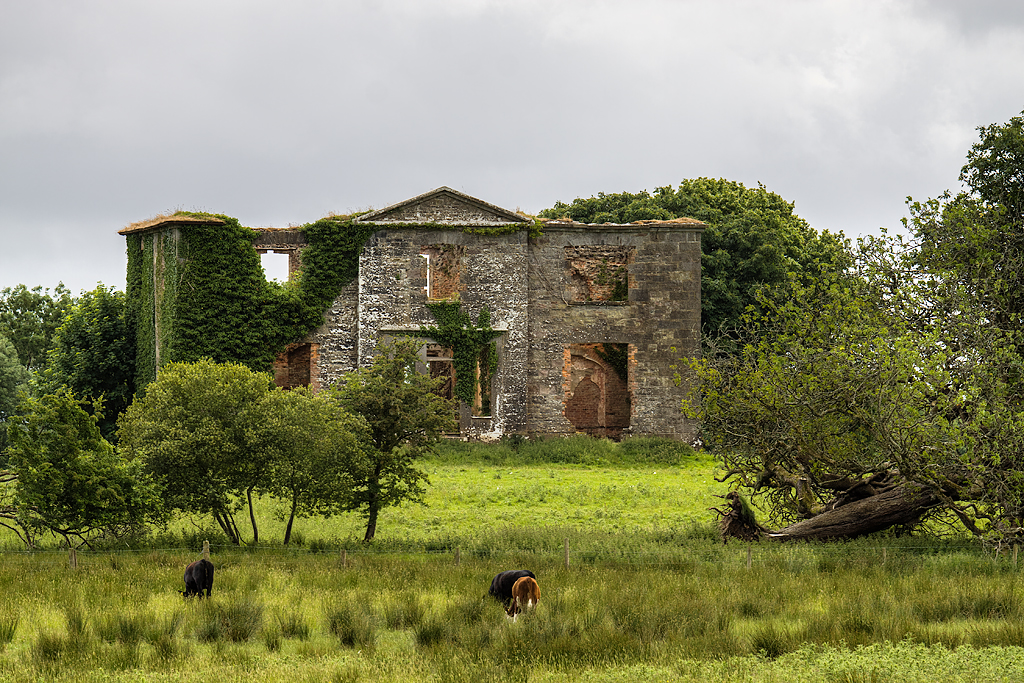
The event was held on the grounds of the ruined Rehins estate near Castlebar town

The first Occasion at the Castle was a landmark two-day outdoor rock festival held in August 1981 on the Rehins Estate, located about four miles outside Castlebar in County Mayo. The event was organised by a trio of local businessmen, Tommy and John Staunton, along with hotelier Tony McHugh, who aimed to inject cultural and economic life into the region. At the time, County Mayo (along with the rest of Ireland) faced economic difficulties, and the organisers hoped the festival would attract a younger demographic and bring wider attention to the area. The festival was ambitious, costing around £150,000 to stage, which was a substantial investment for a rural Irish event at the time.

The music lineup featured a mix of internationally renowned artists and local acts. Headliners included Ian Dury and the Blockheads, The Pretenders led by Chrissie Hynde, Loudon Wainwright III, The Undertones, and the folk duo Kate and Anna McGarrigle. Alongside the music, the festival offered additional amenities to enhance the experience. Organisers provided camping facilities on the estate grounds, several food stalls, bars serving non-alcoholic drinks, and a creche for attendees with children.

Attendance over the August Bank Holiday weekend reached approximately 13,000 people. The festival was notable for its organisation and relative safety, as there were no major incidents or disruptions reported. Apart from the music, the festival featured other activities, including an open-air Catholic mass conducted by a local priest on the Sunday morning and informal early morning jazz sessions that added a relaxed atmosphere to the event.

Despite its cultural significance and positive reception among attendees, the 1981 edition of Occasion at the Castle was not a financial success. For organisers Tommy Staunton, John Staunton and Tony McHugh, the event represented a major gamble, with £120,000 invested, half of which was spent securing headline acts like The Pretenders, Ian Dury and The Blockheads, and The Undertones. Although 13,000 people attended and the festival injected a claimed £3 million into Castlebar’s economy (concentrated in pubs, restaurants, and shops), the organisers came away with a reported loss of £70,000. A key factor limiting their return was the absence of an on-site alcohol licence, which diverted drink-related revenue to local businesses rather than the festival itself. Local media coverage was relatively limited, with most attention coming from national outlets, highlighting the novelty of a multi-day outdoor music festival in Ireland at the time.

=== 1981 lineup ===
Time	Saturday, August 1	Time	Sunday, August 2
		11.00	Real Jazz
12.00	Shaskeen	11.45	Emery Schmidt & McCann
12.45	Jimmy MacCarthy	12.30	Metropolis
1.30	General Humbert	2.00	Stockton's Wing
2.30	The Fuze	2.45	Gerry Carthy & Mickie Finn
3.30	Freddie White	3.30	Rhythm Kings
4.30	Kate & Anna McGarrigle	4.30	De Dannan
5.30	Clannad	5.30	Otway & Barrett
6.30	The Sharks	6.30	Ian Dury & Blockheads
7.30	Loudon Wainwright III	8.00	Moving Hearts
		9.00	Sonny Condell
9.30	The Pretenders	9.30	The Undertones

== 1982 ==
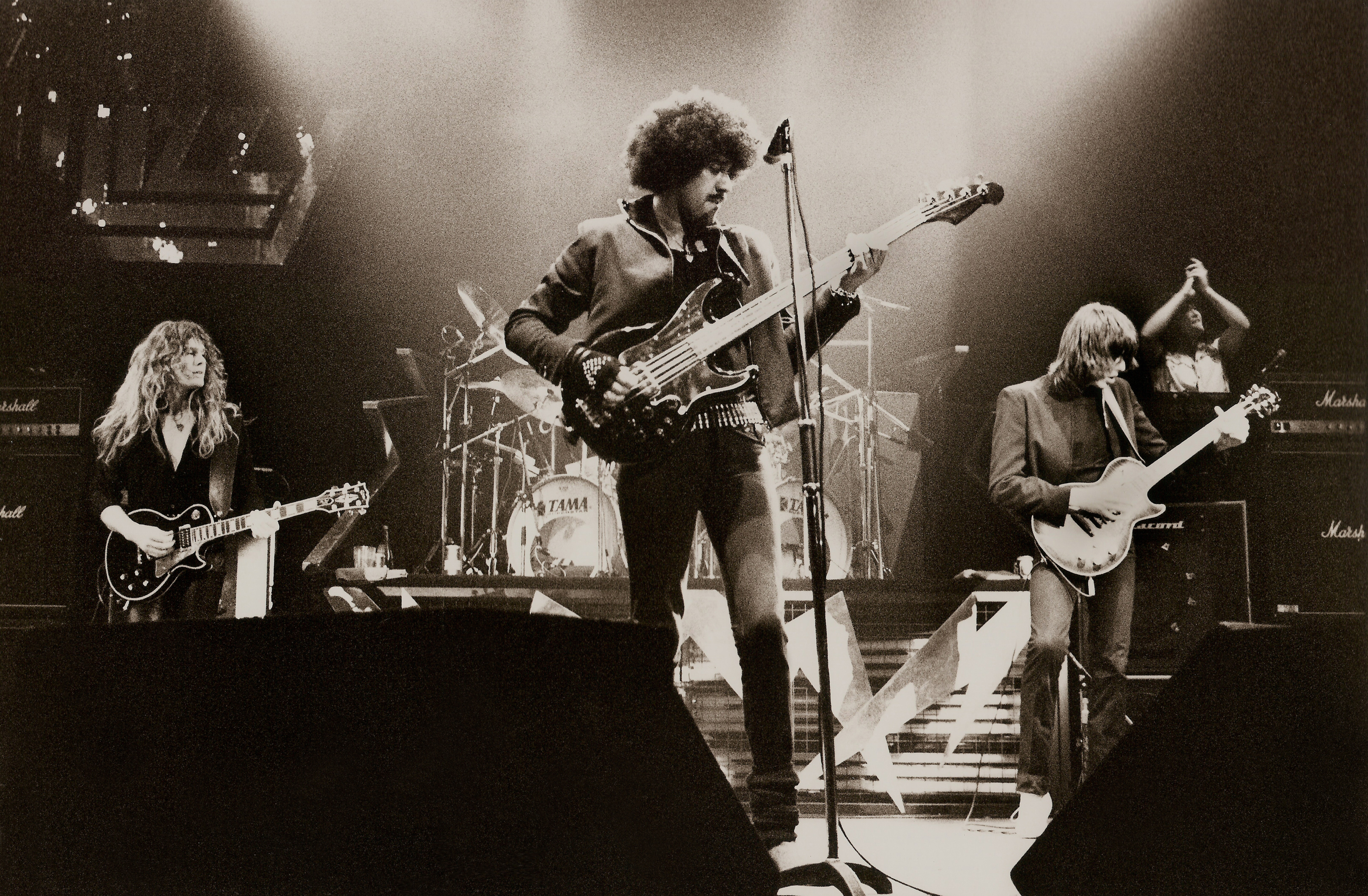
Thin Lizzy, pictured here in 1983, were amongst the headliners for the 1982 festival

Building on the success of the 1981 event, the organisers planned a bigger, three-day festival in 1982, investing £250,000 to establish Occasion at the Castle as a premier music event in the west of Ireland. Held over the August Bank Holiday weekend from July 30 to August 1 at the Raheens estate near Castlebar, the festival featured a strong lineup of international and Irish acts, including Bob Geldof and the Boomtown Rats, Thin Lizzy, Madness, The Fureys and Davey Arthur, Tokyo Olympics, Bogey Boys, Rhythm Kings, Zen Alligators, Brush Shiels, The Memories, April and The Pennies, Big Self, Rosetta Stone, Some Kind of Wonderful, The Barleycorn, Eugene, and the Atrix. The event was emceed by personalities Dave Fanning, BP Fallon, and Jim O’Neill, and produced by Ian McGarry of RTÉ.

The second iteration of the festival offered numerous amenities such as free camping, catering, medical facilities, "controlled prices", free buses, and a complaints centre; the first of its kind at an Irish festival. Ticket prices were set at £5, £12, and £8 for the respective days, or £18 for the full weekend. The 1982 edition of Occasion at the Castle incorporated on-site alcohol sales for the first time, following a successful court application by organiser John Staunton for a beer licence. During the application, Staunton argued that the lack of on-site drink sales in 1981 had contributed to the organisers only breaking even, despite the economic benefit to the wider Castlebar area. Although the presiding judge, Justice Brennan, expressed reservations about the festival, he ultimately granted the licence. This decision allowed the 1982 event to serve alcohol directly to attendees, creating an additional revenue stream aimed at offsetting the considerable costs of staging the festival.

Despite the enhanced organisation and impressive lineup, attendance in 1982 remained steady at about 13,000, the same as the previous year. This was an immediate disappointment to the organisers, who felt they needed an attendance of 14,000 to recover their investment. The modest turnout was partly attributed to external factors such as the ongoing recession and competition from The Rolling Stones’ concert at Slane the previous weekend. A contemporary report in the Evening Press stated "Surveying the small crowd that turned up, you couldn’t help feeling that the ‘real occasion’ had already happened the weekend before, at a castle in Slane".

The 1982 edition of the festival was beset with issues. For most of the festival, there were only around 7,000 attendees at the Rehins site itself, with the other 6,000 attendees estimated to be in Castlebar town, many of whom did not make their way to the official venue. Organiser Paddy McGuinness later admitted to overstating attendance figures to the media and described the event as a "total disaster", both financially and in terms of community relations. Gardaí imposed early curfews on louder acts like The Boomtown Rats and Thin Lizzy, requiring them to finish by 8.30 pm to reduce disruption to nearby residents. Meanwhile, many festivalgoers stayed in town, where some pubs used special licences to serve alcohol and host live music late into the night. This dynamic led to disturbances, temporary business closures, and some bars limiting entry to locals. A brawl near the hospital, which required Garda intervention, further damaged public perception.

Financially, the festival proved to be a failed gamble for the organisers, with the increased scale and costs preventing the event from making a profit. As a result, no further festivals were held after 1982, marking the end of Occasion at the Castle as an ambitious but ultimately unsustainable venture.

In the aftermath of the 1982 festival, Castlebar Urban District Council voted unanimously that future music festivals would have to be granted a license from a court before being held in Castlebar again.
