= Biography (Horslips album) =

Greatest hits album by Horslips
- Released: 1 November 2013
- Recorded: 1970–1980
- Genres: Celtic rock, progressive rock
- Label: Celtic Airs/Horslips Records
- Producer: Producer varies from track to track

Horslips chronology
Live with the Ulster Orchestra (2011)	Biography (2013)

Professional ratings
Review scores
Source	Rating
Hot Press	8/10

Biography is a greatest hits compilation album by Irish Celtic rock band Horslips. The first disc comprises each of the band's singles that were released in the UK. The second comprises the B-sides to each of those singles, some of which have never been released on CD before. The album was released on 1 November 2013, to coincide with the release of the book Tall Tales: The Official Biography of Horslips.

== Track listing ==
All tracks are written by Carr, Fean, Devlin, Lockhart, O'Connor.

Disc One: The A Sides
No.	Title	Length
1.	"The High Reel"
2.	"Dearg Doom"
3.	"More Than You Can Chew" (45 remix)
4.	"Nighttown Boy" (45 edit)
5.	"King of the Fairies"
6.	"(If That's What You Want) That's What You Get" (45 edit)
7.	"Warm Sweet Breath of Love"
8.	"The Power and the Glory" (45 remix)
9.	"Speed the Plough"
10.	"The Man Who Built America"
11.	"Loneliness"

Disc Two: The B Sides
No.	Title	Length
1.	"Furniture" (The High Reel)
2.	"The Shamrock Shore" (Dearg Doom)
3.	"Faster Than the Hound" (More Than You Can Chew)
4.	"We Bring the Summer With Us" (Nighttown Boy)
5.	"Sunburst" (King of the Fairies)
6.	"The Snakes' Farewell to the Emerald Isle" ((If That's What You Want) That's What You Get)
7.	"King of Morning, Queen of Day" (Warm Sweet Breath of Love)
8.	"Sir Festus Burke" (The Power and the Glory)
9.	"Bridge From Heart to Heart" (Speed the Plough)
10.	"Red River Rock (Live)" (Speed the Plough)
11.	"Long Weekend" (The Man Who Built America)
12.	"Homesick" (Loneliness)

== Personnel ==
Horslips

- Eamon Carr – drums, bodhrán, percussions
- Barry Devlin – bass guitar, vocals
- Johnny Fean – guitars, banjo, vocals
- Jim Lockhart – keyboards, flute, tin whistles, uilleann pipes, vocals
- Charles O'Connor – fiddle, mandolin, concertina, vocals
