= The Book of Invasions (album) =

The Book of Invasions: A Celtic Symphony
- original 1976 LP cover

Studio album by Horslips
- Released: 1976
- Genres: Celtic rock, progressive rock
- Length: 41:55 (LP); 1:06:32 (Expanded CD)
- Labels: Horslips Records (Ireland), DJM Records (all other countries)
- Producer: Alan O'Duffy/Horslips

Horslips chronology
Drive the Cold Winter Away (1975)	The Book of Invasions: A Celtic Symphony (1976)	Aliens (1977)

Professional ratings
Review scores
Source	Rating
Allmusic	link

The Book of Invasions: A Celtic Symphony is the sixth album by the Irish Celtic rock band Horslips. It is a concept album based on an adaptation of Irish legends built into a complex story. It is named for the Lebor Gabála Érenn, a book of Irish mythology known as The Book of Invasions in English. Released in 1976, it is usually considered their best work. It was their only UK top-40 album, peaking at #39. "Trouble (With a Capital T)", "Warm Sweet Breath of Love" and "The Power and the Glory" were released as singles.

The 30th anniversary of this album was celebrated at a small gathering in Dublin organised by Horslips fans and was attended by some band members.

== Track listing ==
The album is divided into three movements: "Geantraí" (tracks 1–8), "Goltraí" (tracks 9–11) and "Suantraí" (tracks 12–14).

Side one

1. "Daybreak" (instrumental) – 2:30
2. "March Into Trouble" (instrumental) – 0:51
3. "Trouble (With a Capital T)" – 3:24
4. "The Power and the Glory" – 3:56
5. "The Rocks Remain" – 2:49
6. "Dusk" (instrumental) – 0:37
7. "Sword of Light" – 4:55
8. "Dark" (instrumental) – 1:37

Side two

1. "Warm Sweet Breath of Love" – 3:26
2. "Fantasia (My Lagan Love)" (instrumental) – 2:55
3. "King of Morning, Queen of Day" – 4:32
4. "Sideways to the Sun" – 4:47
5. "Drive the Cold Winter Away" (instrumental) – 0:35
6. "Ride to Hell" – 4:07

Expanded CD with bonus tracks

15. "Daybreak/Drive the Cold Winter Away/Ride to Hell/Sideways to the Sun/Sword of Light" – 18:04
16. "The Rights of Man" – 3:56
17. "Trouble (With a Capital T)" – 3:20

== Personnel ==
=== Musicians ===
- Charles O'Connor - fiddle, mandolin, concertina, vocals, cover design
- Jim Lockhart - keyboards, flute, whistles
- John Fean - guitar, vocals
- Barry Devlin - bass, vocals
- Eamon Carr - drums, percussion

=== Technical ===
- Alan O'Duffy - producer, engineer
- Robbie McGrath - assistant engineer
- Ian Finlay - photography
- Eric G. Bannister - art direction
- Evelyn Lunney - make-up
