= Happy to Meet – Sorry to Part =

Studio album by Horslips
- Released: 1972 (Ireland); 1973 (UK, Europe and US)
- Recorded: Fall 1972
- Studio: Rolling Stones Mobile Studio in Ireland
- Genres: Celtic rock, progressive rock
- Length: 44:45
- Labels: LP - Oats (Ireland), RCA (UK), Atco (US); CD - Edsel (UK)
- Producers: Alan O'Duffy, Horslips

Horslips chronology
Happy to Meet – Sorry to Part (1972)	The Táin (1973)

Professional ratings
Review scores
Source	Rating
AllMusic	4.5/5 stars

Happy to Meet – Sorry to Part is the debut album by Irish folk rock band Horslips. It was first released in Ireland in December 1972 as their début album, on their own Oats label (Oats MOO 3). Before this, they had released the same year three singles: Johnny's Wedding/Flower amang Them All and Green Gravel/Fairy King in Ireland and The High Reel/Furniture overseas. Happy to Meet – Sorry to Part was also released the following year in the United States, on the ATCO label (ATCO SD 7030). In 1973 It was also released in the United Kingdom, Germany, and France.

== Sleeve and packaging ==
The original Irish and US vinyl releases feature a gatefold cover, the first side of which is die-cut to reproduce the lattice work of an English concertina. An eight-page octagonal booklet is bound into the gatefold. The Irish and US releases use different front and rear photographs for the booklet, and a slightly different template for the die-cutting. Later vinyl releases, including an ATCO release later in 1973, have conventional album sleeves with a photograph of the concertina.

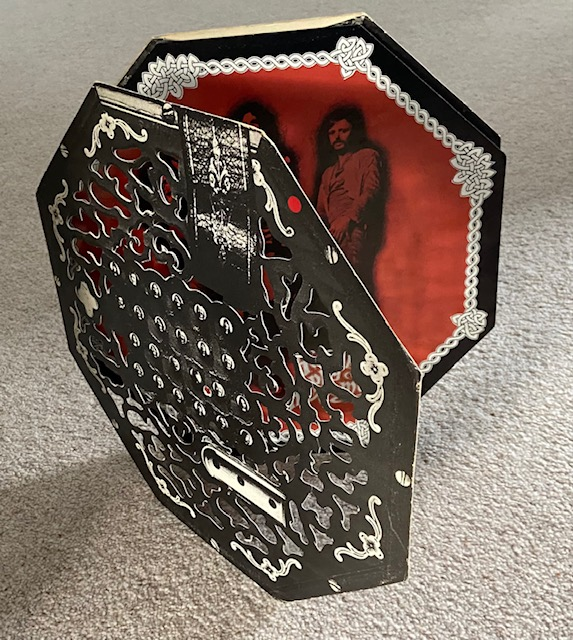

== Track listing ==
1. "Happy to Meet" (instrumental) – 0:48
2. "Hall of Mirrors" – 5:29
3. "The Clergy's Lamentation" (instrumental) – 4:39
4. "An Bratach Bán" – 2:04
5. "The Shamrock Shore" – 4:34
6. "Flower Amang Them All" (instrumental) – 2:04
7. "Bím Istigh Ag Ól" – 3:43
8. "Furniture" – 5:13
9. "Ace and Deuce" (instrumental) – 3:35
10. "Dance to Yer Daddy" – 4:37
11. "The High Reel" (instrumental) – 2:43
12. "Scalloway Ripoff" (instrumental) – 1:54
13. "The Musical Priest" (instrumental) – 4:33
14. "Sorry to Part" (instrumental) – 1:32

The track The High Reel is included in the US release but is missing from the original Irish release. The album has been re-released multiple times; with only some releases including The High Reel .

== Personnel ==
The album gives little information about sources. The labels on the original Irish and US releases state All compositions by Horslips, and on other releases each track is credited to the band. However, apart from Hall Of Mirrors, An Bratach Bán (The White Flag), Bím Istigh Ag Ól (I'm Inside Drinking) and Furniture, each track uses the traditional tune of the same name.

Horslips

- Jim Lockhart - keyboards, concert flute, tin whistles, uilleann pipes, vocals
- Johnny Fean - guitars, banjo
- Charles O'Connor - fiddle, mandolin, concertina, vocals
- Barry Devlin - bass guitar, vocals
- Eamon Carr - drums, bodhrán, percussion

== Notability ==
This is widely considered to be the first Celtic rock album ever recorded. With this, Horslips took the lead in Irish music of the time and created an original mixture from traditional Irish tunes and rock music. The album's name itself is that of an Irish jig.
