= My Mother and Other Strangers =

British drama series (2016)

- Written by: Barry Devlin

Production
- Production location: Northern Ireland

Original release
- Network: BBC Northern Ireland
- Release: 18 June 2017 – 2017

My Mother and Other Strangers is a 2016 British television drama series, written by Barry Devlin, made by BBC Northern Ireland with funding from Northern Ireland Screen. The story is set in a small village in Northern Ireland in 1943, during World War II.

Commissioning of the first series of five 60-minute episodes for BBC One was announced in May 2015. The series began airing on the PBS network in the U.S. in June 2017, as part of PBS' Masterpiece series. The set stage was in Ballycranbeg Rubane, County Down in Ballycran it was the 2nd main stage The main stage was in Kearney, County Down.

== Setting ==
My Mother and Other Strangers is set in 1943 during the Second World War in the fictional village of Moybeg, on the shores of Lough Neagh, Northern Ireland. The series centres on the Coyne family and their neighbours, as they come to terms with the influx of thousands of American servicemen of the USAAF Eighth Air Force into their small, rural community. Writer Barry Devlin, who himself grew up in the small village of Ardboe on the shores of Lough Neagh, stated that he wanted to create an "exotic love story" set in the familiar surroundings of a place he recognised.

== Characters and actors ==
The series has at its core the Coyne family, consisting of Rose Coyne (Hattie Morahan), Michael Coyne (Owen McDonnell), and the Coynes' three children: sixteen-year-old Emma (Eileen O’Higgins); Francis, ten; and Kate, seven.

Also central to the developing story across the five episodes is Captain Dreyfuss (Aaron Staton), a USAAF liaison officer.

The Coynes' neighbours, the Hanlon family, are played by Des McAleer, Seamus O'Hara and Ryan McParland. Charles Lawson plays the parish doctor, Dr Black.

Failey (Kerr Logan) is a local eel fisherman and boyfriend to Sally Quinn (Fiona O’Shaughnessy). She and her brother Barney (Gavin Drea) work on the Coynes' farm.

== Director and producers ==
The series is directed by Adrian Shergold.

The executive producer is Stephen Wright, Head of Drama for BBC Northern Ireland.

The producer is Grainne Marmion.
