= Put 'Em Under Pressure (TV series) =

- Genre: Sport
- Presented by: Gráinne Seoige
- Starring: Pat Spillane; Ruby Walsh
- Country of origin: Ireland
- Original language: English
- No. of series: 1
- No. of episodes: 8

Production
- Production locations: RTÉ Television Centre, Donnybrook, Dublin 4
- Camera setup: Multi-camera
- Running time: 30 minutes

Original release
- Network: RTÉ One
- Release: 18 September – 6 November 2011

Related
- Know Your Sport

Put 'Em Under Pressure is an Irish panel game with a sporting theme hosted by Gráinne Seoige which started on RTÉ One on 18 September 2011. The show's name is taken from "Put 'Em Under Pressure", the official song to the Republic of Ireland national football team's 1990 World Cup campaign.

It involves a team of well-known sports pundits battle against a team of Irish sports stars answering questions on their own and other sports. Each team has a resident captain, each of whom is joined by two guest stars.

== Presenters and team members ==
Gráinne Seoige hosted the show. The team captains were former Kerry Gaelic footballer Pat Spillane and National Hunt champion jockey Ruby Walsh.

== Quiz format ==
The rounds played include:

- Starting Lineup – six numbered squares reveal various sports people, including the names of the four special guests, for contestants to answer a question about.
- Man of the Match – a special guest introduces a piece of footage of one of their major achievements with an alternative commentary. The teams must identify which fact in the commentary is incorrect and why.
- Word of Sport – former Gaelic games commentator Mícheál Ó Muircheartaigh reads an extract from a sporting autobiography or a lyric from a sports-related song. The teams must identify the work in question.
- Five-a-Side – both teams pick a particular topic from a selection of three for the opposing team to answer questions on. Many of the topics have trick names.
- Sprint Finish – this is a ninety-second rapid-fire question round. Each team answers a question with the questions alternating between both teams. If a question is answered incorrectly the contestant is frozen out of the round.

== Broadcast details ==
| Episode | Broadcast date | Pat Spillane's Team | Ruby Walsh's Team | Man of the Match |
|---|---|---|---|---|
| 1. | 18 September 2011 | Kenny Cunningham and Donal Lenihan | Catherina McKiernan and Malcolm O'Kelly | Packie Bonner |
| 2. | 25 September 2011 | Ray Houghton and Con Murphy | Dan Shanahan and Bernard Dunne | Christy O'Connor Jnr |
| 3. | 2 October 2011 | Kevin McStay and Mick Dowling | Conor Niland and Frankie Sheahan | John Treacy |
| 4. | 9 October 2011 | Robert Hall and Tomás Mulcahy | David Gillick and Benny Tierney | Ray Houghton |
| 5. | 16 October 2011 | Jacqui Hurley and Neil Francis | Isa Necewa and Jason Sherlock | Bernard Dunne |
| 6. | 23 October 2011 | Michael Lyster and Brent Pope | Melanie Nocher and Shane McGrath | Kevin O'Brien |
| 7. | 30 October 2011 | Darragh Maloney and Fiona Looney | Jason McAteer and John Aldridge | Ronnie Delany |
| 8. | 6 November 2011 | Jimmy Magee and Marty Morrissey | Bernard Brogan and Shane Byrne | Tony Ward |
