= Put 'Em Under Pressure =

Single by Republic of Ireland Football Squad
- B-side: "Pacemaker"
- Released: 1990
- Recorded: 1990
- Genre: Novelty
- Length: 5:03
- Label: Son Records, London Records
- Songwriter: Trad.
- Producer: Larry Mullen Jr.

"Put 'Em Under Pressure" was the official song to the Republic of Ireland national football team's 1990 FIFA World Cup campaign in Italy.

== Background ==
Produced by U2's Larry Mullen Jr., it featured an intro by Moya Brennan. The song was created by Mullen, Denis Woods, John Donnelly and engineered by John Grimes. The song features 'spoken-word' mash-up taken from the film Que Sera Sera.

The guitar riff takes inspiration from the song "Dearg Doom" by Horslips, which features on the album The Táin. This melody is of traditional origin, and is commonly known as O'Neill's March. It gained prominence when Seán Ó Riada's band Ceoltóirí Chualann performed it for their album "Ó Riada Sa Gaiety" in 1969.

== Release ==
The title became a catchphrase of then manager Jack Charlton, whose soundbites were sampled for the verse; the chorus was a combination of the familiar football chant "Olé Olé Olé" and a reworking of "Ally's Tartan Army" (which was itself set to the tune of "God Save Ireland"), the unofficial theme tune for Scotland in the 1978 FIFA World Cup, and for 13 weeks the song was at number one in the Irish Singles Chart helped by a pulsating video again directed by Billy McGrath featuring footage from Que Sera Sera and the team recording the song in Windmill Lane.

The song is regularly played in celebration at Irish homes matches. It was used as the opening theme for the compilation episode of BBC Switch series Chartjackers. In 2011, RTÉ One aired a quiz show titled Put 'Em Under Pressure, presented by Gráinne Seoige.

The phrase Put 'Em Under Pressure is to this day used in relation to the Ireland national football team.
