= Diana Chire =

London-based artist, editor and publisher

- Born: Djibouti
- Education: Westminster University
- Occupations: artist, editor and publisher
- Website: https://www.dianachire.com/

Diana Chire is a Los Angeles‑based Somali artist and director who first drew national notice when she appeared nude in her exhibit at the 2015 Frieze Art Fair in London. The central themes of her work are gender, sexuality and the nature of racial identity. Her work has been exhibited in galleries from New York to Berlin and has been profiled in W Magazine, i‑D and Dazed & Confused. Her own publication, She‑Zine, presents cutting‑edge contributions from leading female artists. Her film A Living Sculpture was shot in London at Pinewood Studios and is currently screening on the festival circuit. Chire's work dissects female sexuality and racial identity in a raw, unflinching manner that refuses to apologise for its existence.

== Biography ==
Chire was born in Somalia and moved to London, England, when she was five years old. She studied at the University of Westminster. She is the editor and publisher of the arts newspaper She‑Zine.

Chire is recognised for performance pieces that concentrate on black female identity, that expose gender imbalances in the art world, and for using her own body as a medium. In 2016, she shaved her head, explaining that, as she had grown more at ease with employing her body as a medium, she no longer felt the need to wear weaves or straighten her hair in order to be beautiful. She then stitched her weave onto pillowcases.
