= The Biograph =

Former movie theatre in Washington, D.C.

Coordinates: 38.9053°N 77.0576°W

The Biograph was a repertory movie theatre in the DC neighborhood of Georgetown. Opened on September 30, 1967 in the shell of the Nash auto dealership, it closed in 1996.

== History ==
Alan Rubin was one of its cofounders (other owners included Leonard Poryles and David Levy) and he stayed with it until the theatre lost its lease and became a CVS Pharmacy. One of his staff members was Allyn “AJ” Johnson who made a collage out of some of their movie posters. The collage was eventually placed on one of the walls. Johnson managed to salvage the mural. AFI Silver Theatre and Cultural Center now has the mural in its lobby.
