= Lone Raven =

Celtic/World music band based in Columbus, Ohio, USA

Lone Raven is a Celtic/World music band based out of Columbus, Ohio, created by musicians Craig Markley and Kara Markley. Lone Raven is one of the top Celtic bands in the midwest and performs an eclectic blend of traditional music from various areas of the world, as well as their own original compositions.

The band features over 20 instruments on stage and showcases everything from Irish reels and Gaelic vocals to Gypsy and Middle Eastern instrumentals. Band members include:

- Craig Markley on piano, accordions, whistles, guitar, percussion and vocals;
- Kara Markley on lead vocals, fiddle and keyboards;
- Neil Jacobs on 12-string guitar, mandocello, tambura and prim;
- Elizabeth Blickenstaff on fiddle, mandolin and vocals;
- Sid Omasta on acoustic bass, mandolin and fiddle.

In addition to its quintet formation, Lone Raven also occasionally performs in a septet with members of the local Columbus group "Ladies of Longford".

Craig Markley is an experienced multi-instrumentalist, composer, arranger, and session musician. Coming from a varied background of rock, blues, funk and jazz, he has pursued an avid interest in Celtic and World music for the last fifteen years, and he founded the well-known Celtic band “Stark Raven” alongside former bandmate David Reddick in the early 1990s. Sid Omasta was also a member of Stark Raven. Craig's compositions have been featured on radio programs throughout the world, and he has played on over 25 recordings. He also owns Lone Raven Studios, where he has engineered recordings for popular artists such as Grammy nominee Philip Aaberg of Sweetgrass Music and Mike Dugger of Scartaglen, among others. Craig's daughter, Kara Markley, began her musical career at a young age and has studied fiddle with renowned players Eileen Ivers of Riverdance fame, Cape Breton's Natalie MacMaster, and Scotland's John McCusker. She is also an accomplished vocalist who has been featured on numerous recordings, including original compositions by David Tolley.

Lone Raven's newest CD, "Flight to the Hinterlands," was released in November 2011.

The newest addition to the group is Gypsy guitarist Neil Jacobs. His latest solo CD, "12 String Guitar" (recorded at Lone Raven Studios) was recently nominated as best solo guitar album by the 2009 JPF music awards. Neil was also chosen to perform at the JPF awards program in Nashville on August 29, 2010.

== Lone Raven's Partial Discography ==
- "Flight to the Hinterlands" -Lone Raven
- “Bridges of Time” -Lone Raven
- "Once Upon A Winter Moon" -Craig & Kara Markley
- “The Lone Raven” -Craig Markley
- "Class Records Compilation" -Lone Raven
- “Stark Raven” -Stark Raven
- “Committed” -Stark Raven
- "Public Education Music Series" -Hal Leonard Publishing
- "Celtic Melodies" -Great Moods Series, CD and DVD
- “2000 Oasis World Music Sampler” -Craig Markley
- “A Winter Lullaby” -Craig & Kara Markley (out of print)
- “Music of the 1997 Dublin Irish Festival” -Stark Raven (out of print)
- "Get Me Through December" -Craig & Kara Markley (out of print)
- "Crosscurrents" -Markley/Schenk Ensemble (out of print)
- "Daylight/Moonlight" -Markley/Schenk Ensemble (out of print)
- "Dakar" -Craig Markley & Chris Cherry (out of print)

== Sources ==
- http://www.loneraven.com
- http://www.class-acts.com/Entertainers/davidtolley/index.htm
- http://www.neiljacobs.com
