= Zen Alligators =

Irish band

The Zen Alligators were a short-lived Irish rhythm and blues band. Fronted by two ex-members of Horslips, guitarist and vocalist Johnny Fean and drummer Eamon Carr, they were joined by bass player Gary Eglington and Philip Fay on guitar. They released a number of singles in late 1980 and 1981, including "The Invisible Man", "Berlin Wall" and "Voodoo", but no album was ever released. They appeared at a number of local festivals including the (Paul Funge) Gorey Arts Festival on 13 August 1981 & Occasion at the Castle in August 1982.
