= Horslips =

Irish Celtic rock band

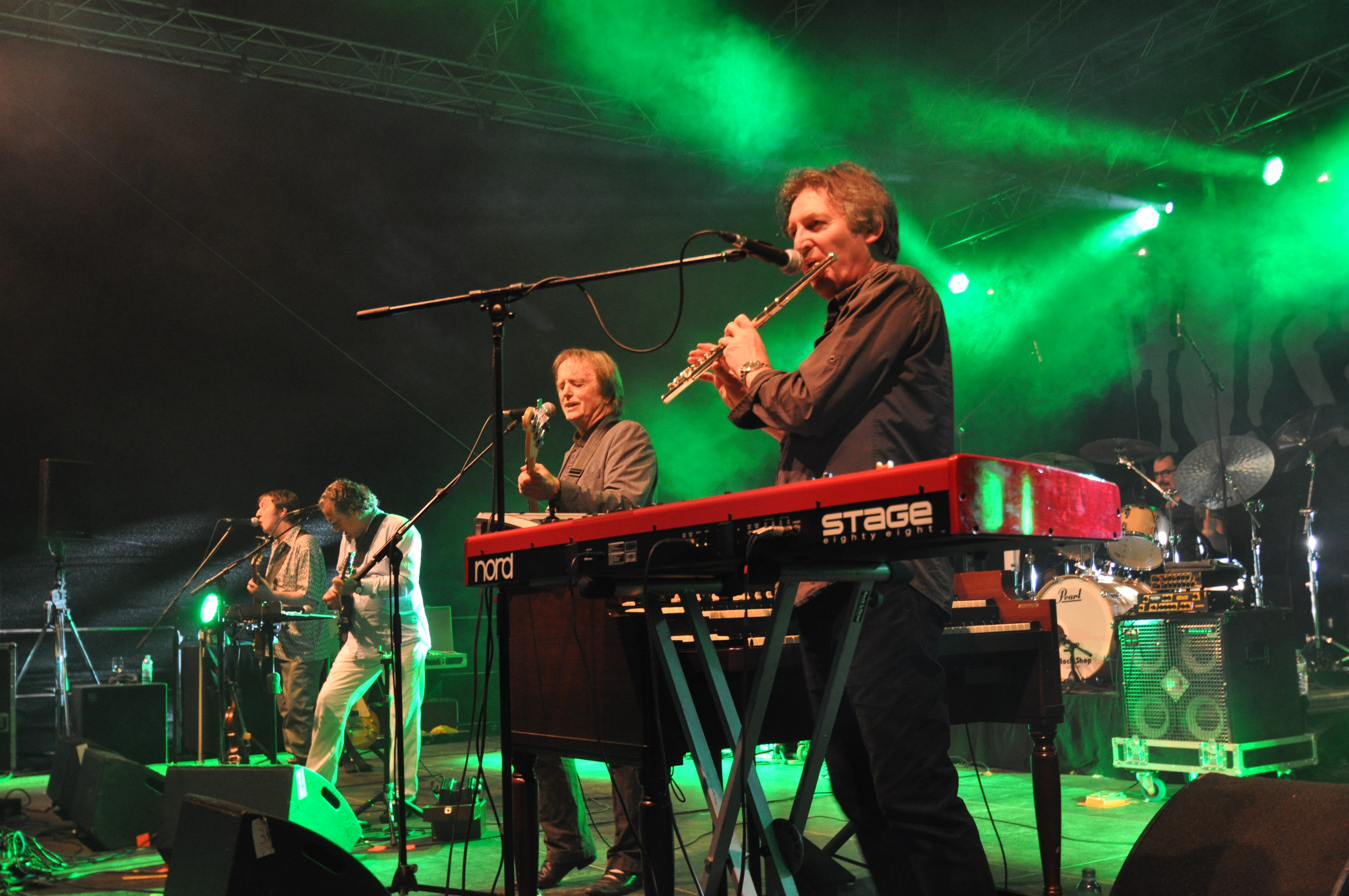
- Horslips performing at the 2014 Black Sheep Festival in Germany

Background information
- Origin: Dublin, Ireland
- Genres: Celtic rock; progressive rock
- Years active: 1970–1980; 2004–2006; 2009–2012
- Past members: Eamon Carr; Barry Devlin; John Fean; Jim Lockhart; Charles O'Connor; Ray Fean; Gus Guest; Declan Sinnott
- Website: horslips.ie

Horslips were an Irish Celtic rock band that compose, arrange and perform songs frequently inspired by traditional Irish airs, jigs and reels. The group are regarded as "founding fathers of Celtic rock" for their fusion of traditional Irish music with rock music and went on to inspire many local and international acts. They formed in 1970 and 'retired' in 1980 for an extended period. The name originated from a spoonerism on The Four Horsemen of the Apocalypse which became "The Four Poxmen of The Horslypse".

Although Horslips had limited commercial success when the band was playing in the 1970s, there was a revival of interest in their music in the late 1990s and they came to be regarded as one of the defining bands of the Celtic rock genre. The band resumed activity between 2004 and 2012, playing a small number of shows and producing releases, both live and studio. They played their final shows in August 2012.

== Band members ==
- Jim Lockhart (born 3 February 1948), from James's St in Dublin, studied Economics and Politics at University College Dublin. He fell under the influence of Seán Ó Riada, wanting to build an orchestral sound out of Irish music. He plays keyboards, pipes, whistles and flute. He did vocals on a select number of songs, mainly in Manx and Irish.
- Eamon Carr (born 12 November 1948), is from Kells, County Meath. He and Peter Fallon were among the founding members of a poetry and beat performance group called Tara Telephone in Dublin in the late 1960s that also published the quarterly literary journal Capella. He is the drummer in the band.
- Charles O'Connor, (Born 7 September 1948) from Middlesbrough in the UK plays concertina, mandolin, fiddle and both electric and slide guitar. He also shares the main vocal tasks with Barry Devlin and Johnny Fean.
- Barry Devlin (born 27 November 1946), from Ardboe in County Tyrone, once trained as a Columban priest. He left this to study English in University College Dublin and afterwards joined a graphics company as a screenwriter. He is the band's bass player, shares vocals, and is its unofficial front man.
- Johnny Fean (17 November 1951 – 28 April 2023) spent his childhood in the city of Limerick and in Shannon, County Clare. He soon mastered guitar, banjo, mandolin and harmonica. In his teens, he played in sessions in Limerick and County Clare. Fean developed his listening tastes from rock to blues and incorporated it into his guitar style. In his late teens he played in a group called Sweet Street, with Joe O'Donnell on electric fiddle and Eugene Wallace. He later played in Jeremiah Henry, a rock and blues band. His idols were Jimi Hendrix and Eric Clapton. He left Jeremiah Henry in 1970 to play traditional music again in Limerick.

== Original run ==
=== Formation and line-ups ===
Barry Devlin, Eamon Carr and Charles O'Connor met when they worked at Arks Advertising Agency in Dublin. They were cajoled into pretending to be a band for a Harp Lager commercial but needed a keyboard player. Devlin said he knew a Jim Lockhart who would fit the bill. The four enjoyed the act so much that they decided to try being proper rock performers. They joined guitarist Declan Sinnott, a colleague of Eamon Carr's from poetry performance and musical group Tara Telephone and, briefly, Gene Mulvaney, to form Horslips (originally Horslypse) in 1970.

The band went professional on St Patrick's Day 1972 having shed Mulvaney and released a single, "Johnny's Wedding", on their own record label, Oats. Declan Sinnott left soon after, primarily due to his annoyance at the group appearing in an advert for Mirinda orange drink (shot in the grounds of Ardmore Studios, Bray, in Easter 1972). Sinnott was replaced by Gus Guest, who appeared on the group's second single "Green Gravel", but departed shortly thereafter. Johnny Fean then replaced Guest, and the 'classic' Horslips line-up that would appear on all future releases was set.

=== Main career ===
==== Album approach ====
Horslips designed their own artwork, wrote sleeve-notes and researched the legends that they made into concept albums. They established their own record label, Oats, and licensed the recordings through Atco, RCA and DJM for release outside Ireland. They kept their base in Ireland, unlike previous Irish bands.

==== First album ====
In October 1972, Horslips went to Longfield House in County Tipperary and recorded their first album, Happy to Meet – Sorry to Part, in the Rolling Stones Mobile Studio. On this first album the melodies were mostly traditional. Jim Lockhart was on keyboards and gradually mastered other instruments including uilleann pipes. Eamon Carr was on drums, including the Irish bodhrán. Happy To Meet, Sorry To Part was the fastest-selling album for eight years in Ireland. The sleeve was an elaborate concertina-shaped fold-out design.

==== The Táin ====
The Abbey Theatre in Dublin asked the band to provide the background for a stage adaptation of "The Táin". They leapt at the opportunity. "Táin Bó Cúailnge" (The Cattle-Raid of Cooley) is a tenth-century story written in Old and Middle Irish. It tells of an ancient war between Ulster and Connacht. The Táin was released in 1973 and had more original material alongside the traditional tunes, and greater emphasis on rock. In the same year a single, "Dearg Doom", became popular in Germany.

==== Later albums ====
Dancehall Sweethearts followed in 1974, and also balanced folk with rock. Their fourth album, The Unfortunate Cup of Tea, drifted toward pop music and was generally considered less successful. RCA ended their funding deal for the group in 1975. The group funded their next venture themselves and went back to basics. Drive The Cold Winter Away (also 1975) was their most traditional album to date. They signed with DJM Records worldwide through A&R man Frank Neilson. The Book of Invasions: A Celtic Symphony (1976), like The Táin, was an adaptation of Irish legends built into a complex story. It became their only entry in the UK Albums Chart, where it peaked at No. 39 in 1977.

==== US and later work ====
Ever ambitious, the band now tried to make it in the United States. They brought in Jim Slye to become their manager. He later sold their publishing rights to William McBurney for £4,000. In 1977 they produced Aliens, about the experience of the Irish in nineteenth-century America. They toured Britain, Germany, Canada and the United States. The night they played the Royal Albert Hall in London was described by one critic as the loudest gig there since Jimi Hendrix. The Man Who Built America (1978), produced by Steve Katz of Blood, Sweat and Tears and Blues Project fame, concerned Irish emigration to the US and received considerable airplay but broad approval was missing. The heavier sound did bring some acceptance in America but they lost their folk base and their freshness.

Short Stories, Tall Tales (1979) was their last studio album and was panned by the record company and critics alike.

=== "The Last Time" ===
At a time when The Troubles were at its peak, Horslips played gigs in both Northern Ireland and the Republic of Ireland without prejudice and were accepted everywhere. Their last recordings were from live performances at the Whitla Hall in Belfast April and May 1980. A few months later, on 12 October 1980 they played their final gig in the Ulster Hall. They made no public announcement. They simply gave an encore — the Rolling Stones' song "The Last Time" (this was a reference to the recording studio of their first album) and the final act was Charles O'Connor throwing his mangled fiddle into the audience. Ten years after they formed, they disbanded.

== Musical life after the break up ==
Even before Horslips ended, Johnny Fean, Eamon Carr and two others founded the Zen Alligators in 1980. They played straight rock and soul on the Irish circuit, and they recorded several singles. Another spin-off group called Host contained Fean, O'Connor and Carr. They issued one album, Tryal, in 1984, and two singles.

The final album that had a Fean/Carr collaboration in the 1980s was The Last Bandits in the World (1986).

Barry Devlin issued a solo album called Breaking Star Codes in 1983 with some help from Jim Lockhart. The album had 12 songs, each based, loosely, on the signs of the zodiac. Further Lockhart/Devlin collaborations included the theme tune to the popular RTÉ drama series Glenroe.

In 1986, Johnny Fean moved to England. An English indie band called Jacobites (1983 to 1986) consisted of Nikki Sudden and Dave Kusworth. Their 1986 album Ragged School had Johnny on guitar. He also played sporadically with a Horslips tribute band Spirit of Horslips and pub gigs with pick up three-piece The Treat, which sometimes featured former Thin Lizzy guitarist Eric Bell instead of Fean.

In 1990, the electric guitar intro to "Dearg Doom" was used for "Put 'Em Under Pressure", Ireland's 1990 World Cup song, written by Larry Mullen and featuring the Republic of Ireland national football team and Moya Brennan.

Charles O'Connor released an instrumental album, Angel on the Mantelpiece, in collaboration with Paul Whittaker in 1997.

=== Further activities ===
- Johnny Fean died on April 28 2023.
- After his retirement, Eamon Carr went on to become a producer of young rock talent in the mid-1980s, and also formed his own record label called Hotwire (which sponsored noted acts such as the punk rock group The Golden Horde). He also did a number of specialist DJ slots on radio before morphing into a music/sports journalist with the Evening Herald in Dublin. More recently he presented on a Dublin station 'Carr's Cocktail Shack' in which he played American music of the 1950s and 1960s. In 2008, Carr and Henry McCullough co-wrote a new bunch of songs. A resulting album entitled Poor Man's Moon was released on 1 September 2008. Also in 2008, Carr released his first book, The Origami Crow, Journey Into Japan, World Cup Summer 2002, a book that is at once a travel log about his journey to Japan, a poetry collection, an homage to Japanese poet Bashō, and also has some sports commentary thrown in.
- Barry Devlin directed for the screen and been a drama writer for radio and screen, as can be seen from his credits on the IMDB and for the radio detective drama Baldi He produced a number of U2 videos in the mid-1980s. Examples of his screen writing are evident in the joint RTÉ/BBC production Ballykissangel and ITV's The Darling Buds of May.
- Jim Lockhart is head of production at RTÉ 2fm and has also done some production work and music arrangement.
- Charles O'Connor owns two antique shops in Whitby, England. O'Connor continued to record folk and traditional music in his home recording studio.

== Releases and copyright issues ==
For 20 years William McBurney, head of Belfast-based Outlet Records for over 40 years, received royalties from the sales of vinyl and CDs, including many compilations. He claimed that he bought the rights in good faith from Jim Slye, who managed Horslips from the late 1970s until the band's final gig. However, the quality of these releases left much to be desired. Shoddy artwork and poor sound meant that most of these releases were sold at bargain prices, leaving the five former band members disillusioned. They fought back and on 7 March 1999 won a court victory in Belfast for copyright ownership and a substantial financial settlement. Horslips are now once again fully in control of their music and they released the entire back catalogue on CD in 2000/2001 with updated artwork and digitally remastered sound.

== Returns ==
=== First revival: 2004 to 2006 ===
In March 2004, three Horslips enthusiasts, Jim Nelis, Stephen Ferris and Paul Callaghan, put on an exhibition of Horslips memorabilia in The Orchard Gallery in Derry. It was opened by the band, who played five songs acoustically. Buoyed by this first public appearance in 24 years, Horslips returned to the studio in Westmeath to produce a studio album, Roll Back, in the summer of 2004. Described as "Horslips Unplugged", the album contained acoustic reworkings of many of their best-known songs.

The same exhibition moved to Drogheda in October 2005, courtesy of longtime fan Paddy Goodwin, and was formally opened on 6 October by a tribute band, Horslypse, composed of nine teenage musicians. Horslips did a version of "Furniture". The exhibition moved to Belfast in February and March 2006 and there were plans for a New York showing in 2007. In February 2008, the exhibition opened in Ballinamore in County Leitrim, and in July it opened in Ballybofey in Donegal.

A double DVD entitled Return of the Dancehall Sweethearts came out in November 2005. Disc one is a documentary and disc two was live footage of the band from the 1970s, including promo videos and slots on The Old Grey Whistle Test.

In December 2005, the band played in front of an invited audience for the recording of the RTÉ television program Other Voices in Dingle in County Kerry. Part of the set included three songs done "full-on" - the first time the band had played live and electric since October 1980.

The last Horslips' event in this phase of their career was a TG4 tribute show recorded and broadcast live on 25 March 2006 before a live invited studio audience. A number of Irish personalities were interviewed, in Irish, about what the band meant to them and how Horslips shaped modern Irish music.

=== 2009 reunion to 2012 ===
On 2 July 2009, it was announced that Horslips would reunite for two shows, their first 'open public' gigs since 1980. The band played the Odyssey Arena in Belfast on 3 December and the 3Arena in Dublin on 5 December. Drummer Eamon Carr did not play the concerts, citing personal reasons, though he was fully supportive and remains a fifth member. His place was taken by Johnny Fean's brother Ray Fean. Recordings from these shows were released on the DVD/CD 'Live at the O2' in November 2010. The O2 Arena has since been renamed as the 3Arena. The Irish band Something Happens were the support act for the show in the 3Arena.

The band played two invitation-only warm up gigs in McHugh's of Drogheda on 26 and 27 November. The band was set to play at "Live at the Marquee" Cork City on 26 June 2010, but the concert was cancelled due to Jim Lockhart falling ill.

In November and December 2010, Horslips, again with Ray Fean on percussion, returned with a four gig tour of Ireland. These included the INEC (Ireland's National Event Centre) in Killarney (27 November), the Royal Theatre in Castlebar (28 November), the Waterfront Hall in Belfast (1 December) and culminated in a return to the O2 Arena on 4 December. They played at the 2011 Celtic Connections Festival in Glasgow's "Old Fruitmarket" on 18 January. On 10 February 2010, it was announced that Horslips would be special guests under Fairport Convention at Fairport's Cropredy Convention 2011. They performed on 13 August.

On St Patrick's Day, 17 March 2011, the band played a BBC concert with the Ulster Orchestra at Belfast's Waterfront Hall. Later in 2011, they played the London Feis festival in Finsbury Park (Saturday 18 and Sunday 19 June), sharing the bill with many other luminaries like Christy Moore, Van Morrison, and Bob Dylan.

==== Final concerts ====
On 3 June 2012, Horslips performed as the headline act at the Rory Gallagher Tribute Festival in Ballyshannon, County Donegal, and on 25 and 26 August, they played two shows in Ireland's National Concert Hall with the RTÉ Concert Orchestra.

=== Biographical book and album ===
On 4 November 2013, Horslips released their biography Tall Tales. The book was written by Mark Cunningham and features interviews with the band. A double album featuring all the group's singles released outside Ireland, called Biography, was also released. On the Summer Solstice (21 June) 2014, Horslips played at Dunluce Castle, near Portrush in Northern Ireland, and in August of that year, they played at Milkmarket in Limerick.

=== After Horslips ===
On 12 March 2019, two of the band, Barry Devlin and Jim Lockhart, played at an event in the National Concert Hall, Dublin, to commemorate the occupation by radical students of the administration block at University College, Dublin, 50 years before. They joined the house band for the night, made up of members of Chris Meehan and his Redneck Friends, along with other well-known musicians, actors and performers who had been involved in the events of 1969, when the building that is now the NCH was part of UCD.

On 11 and 12 May 2019, with Charles retired from music, original members Barry, Johnny and Jim plus Ray Fean (drums) played two concerts at Belfast's Cathedral Quarter Arts Festival, at Custom House Square. The shows were promoted as 'Barry Devlin, Johnny Fean & Jim Lockhart from Horslips'.

Johnny Fean died in April 2023.

== Discography ==
=== Studio albums ===
- Happy to Meet – Sorry to Part (1972)
- The Táin (1973)
- Dancehall Sweethearts (1974)
- The Unfortunate Cup of Tea (1975)
- Drive the Cold Winter Away (1975)
- The Book of Invasions (1976) UK No. 39
- Aliens (1977) U.S. No. 98
- The Man Who Built America (1978) U.S. No. 155
- Short Stories/Tall Tales (1979)
- Roll Back (2004)

=== Compilation albums ===
- Tracks from the Vaults (1977)
- The Horslips Story - Straight from the Horse's Mouth (1989)
- Treasury (2009)
- Biography (2013)
- More Than You Can Chew (2023) Box Set
- At the BBC (2025) Box Set

=== Live albums ===
- Horslips Live (1976)
- The Belfast Gigs (1980)
- Live at the O2 (2010)
- Live with the Ulster Orchestra (2011)

=== Filmography ===
- The Return Of The Dancehall Sweethearts (2005)
- The Road to O2 - A Film About Getting to the Gig (2010)

=== Bibliography ===
- Tall Tales (2013)
