= Barry Devlin =

Irish musician, screenwriter and director

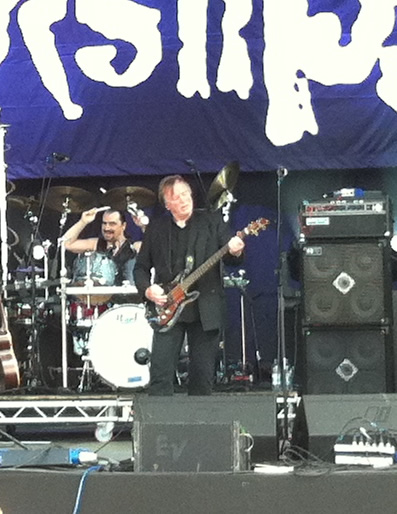
- Born: 27 November 1946 (age 79)
- Occupations: Musician; director; screenwriter
- Years active: 1970–present

Barry Daniel Devlin (born 27 November 1946) is an Irish musician, screenwriter and director.

== Early life ==
Devlin is from Moortown in Ardboe, County Tyrone. He initially began to train as a Columban priest, but left to study English at University College Dublin and then joined a graphics company as a screenwriter.

== Career ==
He was in the pioneering Irish Celtic rock band Horslips as bass player, vocalist and front man. After the breakup of Horslips, Devlin released the 1983 solo album Breaking Star Codes. In December 1985, he produced the single "Thank You Very Much, Mr. Eastwood" for comedian Dermot Morgan on Dolphin Records. Horslips reunited from 2004 - 2006, and again from 2009 - 2019.

He has directed for the screen, producing a number of U2 videos in the 1980s. He has also been a writer for radio and screen, originating the radio detective drama Baldi and writing episodes for the television series Ballykissangel and The Darling Buds of May and the screenplay for the film A Man of No Importance (1994). He wrote the screenplays for the five episodes of the television series My Mother and Other Strangers, which aired in 2016. He co-wrote with Paul J. Bolger Hound, a graphic novel trilogy based on the Ulster Cycle that got limited release from 2014 to 2018 before Dark Horse published an omnibus edition. In 2015, Devlin won the Best Writer Published in Ireland award at the Irish Comic News alongside Paul for Hound.

== Family ==
His sister, Marie Devlin, is a school teacher and writer, who published Over Nine Waves, a collection of traditional Irish myths and legends, in 1994. She was married to the Nobel laureate Seamus Heaney, from 1965 until the poet's death in 2013. One of his six sisters is Polly Devlin, the writer and broadcaster, who was awarded the OBE for services to literature. Her first book, All Of Us There, is now a Virago Modern Classic. She made a documentary film The Daisy Chain and now is a professor at Columbia University, New York.
