= Live from the Woods at Fontanel =

Live album by Needtobreathe
- Released: April 14, 2015
- Recorded: September 13, 2014
- Venues: Carl Black Chevy Woods Amphitheater, Fontanel Mansion, Whites Creek, TN
- Genres: Christian rock; indie rock; Southern rock; CCM
- Length: 100:30
- Labels: Atlantic; Word
- Producer: Needtobreathe

Needtobreathe chronology
Rivers in the Wasteland (2014)	Live from the Woods at Fontanel (2015)	Hard Love (2016)

Live from the Woods at Fontanel is the first live album by American Christian rock band Needtobreathe, released on April 14, 2015, through Atlantic and Word Records. The album was recorded on September 13, 2014, during the Rivers in the Wasteland Tour.

== Critical reception ==
Professional ratings
Review scores
Source	Rating
365 Days of Inspiring Media	4/5 stars
AllMusic	3.5/5 stars
CCM Magazine	4/5 stars
Christian Music Review	4.5/5
Christian Review Magazine	5/5 stars
Cross Rhythms	10/10 squares
Jesus Freak Hideout	4.5/5 stars 4/5 stars
New Release Tuesday	5/5 stars

Specifying in a three and a half star review by AllMusic, Marcy Donelson recognizes, "Overall, while the track selection doesn't quite substitute for a greatest-hits collection, the album captures a strong live band delivering a clean, energetic performance (including revealing stage banter) that is certain to please fans and an absolute must for anyone interested in a souvenir of the tour." Alex Caldwell, indicating in a four and a half review from Jesus Freak Hideout, realizes, "They are quite simply a masterful live act." Mentioning in a five star review for New Release Tuesday, Christopher Thiessen reports, "whatever great things Needtobreathe has done in the past in the studio, they can and have done better live. Live from the Woods captures that perfectly... [where] every single song on the album is improved from its original." Andy Argyrakis, awarding the album four stars from CCM Magazine, describes, "this isn't Needtobreathe's most cleanly produced project, but the raw spontaneous feeling provides an accurate and engaging snapshot of what took place on the tour, while also allowing the group's redemptive lyrics to come across loud and clear." Rating the album four out of five stars at 365 Days of Inspiring Media, Joshua Andre declares, "Live from the Woods will definitely tie [sic] me over until then, and maybe by some more!" Lauren McLean, awarding the album 4.5 out of five at Christian Music Review, writes, "This album is the best thing next to seeing them live." Giving the album five stars from Christian Review Magazine, Leah St. John says, "An extremely well produced live album".

== Track listing ==
All tracks are written by Bear and Bo Rinehart.

Disc 1
No.	Title	Length
1.	"State I'm In"	4:22
2.	"Wanted Man"	7:37
3.	"Drive All Night"	5:39
4.	"Difference Maker"	6:05
5.	"Multiplied"	5:08
6.	"Oh, Carolina"	9:37
7.	"Wasteland"	6:55

All tracks are written by Bear and Bo Rinehart.

Disc 2
No.	Title	Length
1.	"Keep Your Eyes Open"	4:19
2.	"Washed by the Water"	8:03
3.	"Something Beautiful"	4:20
4.	"Girl Named Tennessee"	7:19
5.	"Brother"	4:14
6.	"The Heart"	7:18
7.	"The Outsiders"	5:52
8.	"More Heart, Less Attack"	5:56
9.	"Feet, Don't Fail Me Now"	4:00
10.	"Devil's Been Talkin'"	3:46

== Charts ==
Chart (2015)	Peak position
US Billboard 200	58
US Top Alternative Albums (Billboard)	8
US Top Christian Albums (Billboard)	2
US Digital Albums (Billboard)	21
US Top Rock Albums (Billboard)	9
