= State I Am In =

State I Am In or The State I Am In may refer to:

- The State I Am In (film), 2000 German film
- "State I'm In" (song), 2014 song by Needtobreathe
- State I'm In (album), 2019 album by Aaron Lewis
- The State I'm In (Louie Louie album), 1990
- The State I'm In (Leigh Nash album), 2015
- "The State I Am In", song from the 1996 album Tigermilk by Belle & Sebastian
- "The State I'm In", song from the 1995 eponymous album by Ednaswap
