= Pauline (album) =

Studio album by Pauline Henry
- Released: 1993
- Genres: Dance; funk/soul; pop
- Label: Sony Soho Square
- Producers: Mike Ward; Eliot Kennedy; Cary Baylis; Blacksmith; Errol Henry; Tim Lever; Mike Percy; Robyn Smith; Ian Levine; Nigel Lowis; Louie Louie

Pauline Henry chronology
Pauline (1993)	Do Over (1996)

Pauline is the debut solo album by British-Jamaican former the Chimes singer Pauline Henry, released by Sony Soho Square in 1993. The album includes the singles "Too Many People", a cover of Bad Company's "Feel Like Making Love", "Can't Take Your Love" and "Watch the Miracle Start". It peaked at No. 45 on the UK Official Charts.

== Critical reception ==
Professional ratings
Review scores
Source	Rating
The Guardian	(favorable)
Music Week	3/5 stars
Select	1/5 medals
Smash Hits	5/5 stars

Caroline Sullivan from The Guardian complimented the debut album as "an appealing collage of pop and dramatic funk. Henry turns her massive voice to house ('Revolution'), Aretha-ish gospel ('Too Many People') and cocktail-hour soul ('Now I've Been to Paradise') with equal aplomb." Claire Armitt from Smash Hits gave it a top score of five out of five and named it "a brilliant debut album". David Toop from The Times wrote, "Now a soloist, [Pauline Henry] is recording songs with more substance than the near-exhausted formula of wailing a soulful vocal over a danceable groove. She has drawn from 25 tracks for her first solo venture. There is a strong 1970s feel with a contemporary edge, particularly on the old hit 'Feel Like Making Love', and Ian Levine's bouncy disco production of 'I've Got a Feeling'."

== Track listing ==
No.	Title	Writer(s)	Length
1.	"Revolution"	Pauline Henry; Mike Ward; Cary Baylis; Eliot Kennedy	4:44
2.	"Baby I Know"	Ward; Baylis	3:48
3.	"Too Many People"	Henry; Ward; Baylis; Kennedy	3:59
4.	"Feel Like Making Love"	Paul Rodgers; Mick Ralphs	4:48
5.	"Now I've Been to Paradise"	Henry; Robyn Smith; Tina Harris; Leon Ware	4:59
6.	"Can't Take Your Love"	Henry; Terry Britten	3:46
7.	"I've Got a Feeling"	Ward; Baylis; Kennedy	3:26
8.	"Watch the Miracle Start"	Ward; Baylis; Kennedy	3:52
9.	"Touch of Your Hand"	Ward; Baylis; Kennedy	5:18
10.	"Now That I've Found You"	Henry; Nigel Lowis	4:31
11.	"Revolution" (Louie Louie Remix)	Henry; Ward; Baylis; Kennedy	4:49

== Personnel ==
Adapted from the album's liner notes.

- Tracks 1 & 9 produced by Mike Ward, Eliot Kennedy & Cary Baylis
- Track 1 remix & additional production by Blacksmith; mixed by Yoyo & The Funk Mobb
- Track 9 remix & additional production by Errol Henry
- Tracks 2–4 & 6 produced by Tim Lever & Mike Percy
- Track 5 produced by Robyn Smith; engineered by John Gallen
- Tracks 7 & 8 produced by Ian Levine; arranged by Ian Levine & Nigel Stock; engineered by Tim Eames
- Track 10 produced by Nigel Lowis; engineered by Ren Swan
- Track 11 produced by Louie Louie

== Charts ==
Chart performance for Pauline
Chart (1993)	Peak position
Australian Albums (ARIA)	37
UK Albums (Official Charts)	45
