= Dear Jesus =

EP by We the Kingdom
- Released: January 30, 2026
- Recorded: 2023–2025
- Genre: Folk rock
- Length: 26:39
- Labels: Capitol CMG; Sparrow Records
- Producer: The Kangies

We the Kingdom chronology
Live from Ryman (2023)	Dear Jesus (2026)	Everything I Thought Was Pleasure (2026)

We the Kingdom EPs chronology
A Family Christmas (2021)	Dear Jesus (2026)	Everything I Thought Was Pleasure (2026)

Singles from Dear Jesus
- 1. "Rescue Me" Released: January 22, 2026

Dear Jesus is the seventh extended play (EP) by the American Christian rock band We the Kingdom. The EP was released on January 30, 2026, via Capitol Christian Music Group and Sparrow Records, to CD, LP, digital download and streaming formats. The EP was produced by The Kangies and written by Andrew Bergthold, Ed Cash, Martin Cash, Scott Cash, and Chris Tomlin.

Dear Jesus was supported with the release of "Rescue Me" January 22, 2026 as the EP's only single, and "Don't Let the Darkness" on October 24, 2025, "Dear Jesus" on November 21, 2025 and "Easy" on January 9, 2026 as promotional singles. "Rescue Me" peaked at number 24 on the Billboard Hot Christian Songs chart. The EP features a guest appearance from Tomlin.

== Release and promotion ==
On October 24, 2025, We the Kingdom released the first promotional single from the EP, "Don't Let the Darkness". The song saw the band's attempt at centralizing "the simplicity of being a band," in addition to creating music that "feels both classic and current." An official music video of the song was uploaded to YouTube. On November 21, 2025, "Dear Jesus" was released as the second promotional single. The song was inspired by a conversation which the band had with a man whose life was change significantly since becoming a Christian. A lyric video for the song was released to YouTube. With the release of its title track, Dear Jesus was announced, with its cover artwork, track listing, and release date. The EP was made available for preorder.

On January 9, 2026, the song "Easy" was released as a promotional single. On January 22, 2026, "Rescue Me" was released to Christian contemporary hit radio in the United States as the album's lead and only single.

== Writing and development ==
Dear Jesus demonstrates the style of folk rock. It was recorded between 2023 and 2025. Shore Fire Media noted the EP's themes of surrender, belonging, and renewal, acclaiming its ability to communicate the ideas through "vivid imagery and a raw sense of faith." With the EP, We the Kingdom attempted to write lyrics which were "deeply personal, rooted in faith, and unafraid to wrestle with both light and darkness." The EP has been described as being "We The Kingdom's most personal release yet", containing "songs that reflect real life, including both the beauty and the struggle, and the moments of light that break through." It was recorded in We the Kingdom's personal studio in Nashville, Tennessee.

The EP features writing credits from Bergthold, E. Cash, M. Cash, S. Cash, and Tomlin. It was produced by The Kangies. The EP's tracks were programmed by Bergthold and engineered by Ainslie Grosser and The Kangies. It was mixed by Dafydd Thomas and The Kangies, and mastered by Sam Moses. Artists and repertoire was managed by Carter Henderson, Chad Chrisman, and Garrett Davis.

== Reception ==
Professional ratings
Review scores
Source	Rating
Jesus Freak Hideout	3.5/5 stars
Jubilee Cast	3/5 stars
Today's Christian Entertainment	5/5 stars

=== Critical ===
Dear Jesus received mixed reception from critics. In a 3.5-out-of-5 star review for Jesus Freak Hideout, Alex Caldwell described the EP as "musical comfort food" containing "warm, familiar 60's and 70's folk-rock vibe," praising its "mellow grooves and appealing songs that soothe the soul." Later continuing on with the "musical comfort food" metaphor, he criticized its short length as "a good snack that could have been a great meal with some additional ingredients," but regardless, "still goes down smoothly and nourishes the soul after a long day."

In a similar score of 3-out-of-5 stars for Jubilee Cast, Timothy Yap stated that, "in many ways, it succeeds. In others, it feels cautious and uneven," describing the EP as "meaningful" but not "fully memorable." He observed that the EP "reflects a desire for freedom and authenticity," containing "no overarching concept, no radio-driven urgency, and no attempt to chase current worship trends," which he described as "admirable". He enjoyed the EP's "emotional honesty," but criticized it's "creative restraint" as being too predictable. Awarding the album with a perfect score of 5-out-of-5 stars, Darcy Webber of Today's Christian Entertainment praised the "amazing lyrics, music, and vocals" found in Dear Jesus. He observed that, unlike previous releases by the band, the EP contained no "great vertical worship song," but stated that the fault "[doesn't] take away from Dear Jesus."

=== Commercial ===
Shortly following the release of the EP, the track "Rescue Me" received attention from Christian radio in the United States. The track went on to peak at number 24 on the Billboard Hot Christian Songs chart, number 8 on the Christian Airplay chart, and number 11 on the Christian Adult Contemporary chart.

== Track listing ==
All tracks are written by Andrew Bergthold, Ed Cash, Marin Cash, and Scott Cash, and produced by The Kangies, unless otherwise noted.

No.	Title	Writer(s)	Length
1.	"Don't Let the Darkness"		3:16
2.	"Let It Be Jesus"		3:38
3.	"Rescue Me"		3:32
4.	"Dear Jesus"		3:26
5.	"I Belong to You"		3:16
6.	"Holiness" (featuring Chris Tomlin)	Andrew Bergthold; Ed Cash; Marin Cash; Scott Cash; Chris Tomlin	3:20
7.	"Easy"		6:10
Total length:			26:39

== Personnel ==
Credits adapted from Tidal Music.

=== We the Kingdom ===
- Andrew Bergthold – writer (all tracks), background vocals (all tracks), keyboards (all tracks), programmer (all tracks)
- Ed Cash – writer (all tracks), acoustic guitar (all tracks), bass guitar (all tracks), lead vocals (all tracks)
- Martin Cash – writer (all tracks), acoustic guitar (all tracks), background vocals (all tracks), electric guitar (all tracks)
- Scott Cash – writer (all tracks), acoustic guitar (all tracks), background vocals (all tracks), electric guitar (all tracks)

=== Technical ===
- Ainslie Grosser – engineer (all tracks)
- Dafydd Thomas – mixer (all tracks)
- Sam Moses – masterer (all tracks)
- The Kangies – producer (all tracks), engineer (all tracks), mixer (7)

=== Additional musicians ===
- Andriana Seay – background vocals (all tracks)
- Jamiah Hudson – background vocals (all tracks)
- Kenny Hutson – steel guitar (4)
- Kyle Evertson – steel guitar (4)
- Scotty Murray – steel guitar (4)
- Sheldon Thomas – background vocals (all tracks)

== Release history ==
Release history and formats for Dear Jesus
Region	Date	Format(s)	Label(s)	Ref.
Various	January 30, 2026	CD; LP; digital download; streaming	Capitol CMG; Sparrow Records	
