= The Chimes (album) =

1990 studio album by The Chimes

Studio album by the Chimes
- Released: 21 May 1990 (Australia & New Zealand); 11 June 1990 (UK)
- Label: CBS
- Producers: The Chimes; Jazzie B; Nellee Hooper

The Chimes is the only studio album by Scottish dance music act the Chimes, released in 1990 by CBS Records. Featuring singer Pauline Henry on vocals, the album includes their cover of U2's "I Still Haven't Found What I'm Looking For", which reached number six in the UK Singles Chart, along with their other top 40 hit "Heaven", which reached number 24. The album was certified silver in the UK, and gold in Australia.

== Critical reception ==
Professional ratings
Review scores
Source	Rating
AllMusic	4.5/5 stars
Calgary Herald	B+
Robert Christgau	(dud)
Melody Maker	(favorable)
NME	8/10
Select	4/5

In a retrospective review for AllMusic, Steve Mason called the album "completely solid and credible". He described lead singer Pauline Henry's voice as being "expressive but controlled" and "powerful without resorting to the tiresome trills and oversinging of so many of her R&B contemporaries". He also said that the multi-instrumentalist band members and producers James Locke and Michael Peden "combine pop, dance, and soul influences into a seamless, sleekly danceable blend."

== 2016 re-issue ==
A remastered, expanded 2-CD version of the album was released in September 2016, containing the original album plus B-sides, remixes, and two newly recorded versions of "Heaven" by Henry.

== Track listing ==
All tracks written by the Chimes, except where noted.

No.	Title	Writer(s)	Length
1.	"Love So Tender"		2:58
2.	"Heaven"		3:49
3.	"True Love"		3:53
4.	"1-2-3"		3:23
5.	"Underestimate"		4:08
6.	"Love Comes to Mind"		4:52
7.	"Don't Make Me Wait"		4:01
8.	"Stronger Together"		3:51
9.	"I Still Haven't Found What I'm Looking For"	David Evans; Paul Hewson; Adam Clayton; Larry Mullen Jr.	5:27
10.	"Stay"		4:41
11.	"I Still Haven't Found What I'm Looking For" (Street Mix)	Evans; Hewson; Clayton; Mullen Jr.	6:17
12.	"Heaven" (Physical Mix)		8:26

Note

- Tracks 11 and 12 are included on the CD version only.

== Personnel ==
Adapted from the album's liner notes.

=== Musicians ===
- All music performed by the Chimes (Pauline Henry, Mike Peden, James Locke), except:
- Eric Bazilian – harp, bass melodica (track 9)
- Luís Jardim – percussion (track 5)
- Eric Kupper – keyboards (track 12)
- Simon Law – piano (tracks 3, 4, 5 & 8)
- Sammy Merendino – additional drum programming (track 9)
- The Reggae Philharmonic Orchestra – strings (tracks 5 & 8)
- Frank Ricotti – vibes (track 6)
- Mykaell S. Riley – vocal arrangements (tracks 5, 7, 8, 9 & 11), string arrangements (tracks 5 & 8)
- Ralph Schuckett – piano (track 9), synthesizers (track 9)
- Tony Spiker – conga (tracks 3 & 8)
- Phil Todd – flute (track 6)
- Pete Wingfield – piano (tracks 1, 2, 6, 7 & 10)
- Peter Wood – synthesizers (track 9)

=== Technical ===
- Tracks 1, 2 & 5–12 produced by the Chimes
- Tracks 3 & 4 produced by Jazzie B & Nellee Hooper
- Tracks 1, 6–8 & 10 mixed by the Chimes
- Track 2 mixed by Peter Hinds; co-mixing on track 6
- Track 5 remixed & edited by Frankie Foncett; engineered by Tim Russell
- Track 9 mixed by Scruff & Nick
- Track 11 remixed by Louie Louie
- Track 12 additional production & mixing by David Morales
- All tracks programmed by Mel Wesson
- Engineering on track 12 by John Poppo
- Photography by Enrique Badulescu & Steve Rapport
- Design by Peter Barrett & Andrew Biscomb

== Charts ==
=== Weekly charts ===
Chart (1990)	Peak position
Australia (ARIA)	16
Austria (Ö3 Austria Top 40)	20
Germany (GfK Entertainment Charts)	30
Netherlands (MegaCharts)	37
New Zealand (RMNZ)	3
Sweden (Sverigetopplistan)	36
Switzerland (Swiss Hitparade)	32
UK Albums (OCC)	17
US (Billboard 200)	162
US (Top R&B/Hip-Hop Albums)	71

=== Year-end charts ===
Chart (1990)	Position
Australia (ARIA)	86

== Certifications ==
Region	Certification	Certified units/sales
Australia (ARIA)	Gold	35,000^{^}
United Kingdom (BPI)	Silver	60,000^{^}
^{^} Shipments figures based on certification alone.
