= Rivers in the Wasteland =

Studio album by Needtobreathe
- Released: April 15, 2014
- Recorded: December 2012 – December 2013
- Studios: Plantation Studios, Charleston, South Carolina; Fairfax Recordings, Van Nuys, California; Blackbird Studios, Nashville, Tennessee; Ed's, Franklin, Tennessee
- Genres: Alternative rock; Christian rock; folk rock; indie rock; Southern rock
- Length: 45:29
- Labels: Atlantic; Curb; Word
- Producers: Ed Cash; Jerrod Bettis; Joe Chiccarelli; Kevin Augunas; Needtobreathe

Needtobreathe chronology
The Reckoning (2011)	Rivers in the Wasteland (2014)	Live from the Woods at Fontanel (2015)

Singles from Rivers in the Wasteland
- 1. "The Heart + Difference Maker" Released: January 14, 2014; 2. "State I'm In" Released: February 17, 2014; 3. "Wasteland" Released: April 1, 2014; 4. "Multiplied" Released: 2014; 5. "Brother" Released: February 2, 2015

Rivers in the Wasteland is the fifth studio album by American Christian rock band Needtobreathe, released on April 15, 2014, through Atlantic, Curb, and Word Records. The album was produced by the band along with Ed Cash, Jerrod Bettis, Joe Chiccarelli and Kevin Augunas at various studios.

The album debuted at No. 1 on the Billboard Christian Albums chart, No. 1 on the Billboard Rock Albums chart and No. 3 on the Billboard 200 chart.

The album's fourth single, "Multiplied", was nominated for a Grammy at the 57th Annual Grammy Awards in the Best Contemporary Christian Music Performance/Song category. The album's fifth and final single, "Brother", proved to be the band's biggest hit to date, peaking at No. 98 on the Billboard Hot 100.

== Background and recording ==
Rivers in the Wasteland was recorded from December 2012 through December 2013. It was produced by the band along with Ed Cash, Jerrod Bettis, Joe Chiccarelli and Kevin Augunas. The album was recorded at Plantation Studios in Charleston, South Carolina, Fairfax Recordings in Van Nuys, California, Blackbird Studios in Nashville, Tennessee and Ed's in Franklin, Tennessee. (Note: According to the inner liner notes of the album.)

== Reception ==
=== Critical reception ===
Professional ratings
Review scores
Source	Rating
365 Days of Inspiring Media	4/5 stars
AllMusic	3.5/5 stars
CCM Magazine	4/5 stars
Christian Music Zine	5/5 stars
CM Addict	4/5 stars
Cross Rhythms	10/10 squares
Jesus Freak Hideout	4.5/5 stars
New Release Tuesday	5/5 stars
PopMatters	5/10 discs

Rivers in the Wasteland received mostly positive reviews from music critics. Tony Cummings, founder of Cross Rhythms, rated the album a perfect ten squares, calling it a "delicious album" that "demonstrates once again that when you've got quality songwriting and a band on the top of their game, all resistance melts away." At CCM Magazine, Matt Conner rated the album four stars out of five, calling the release a "spirited" affair on which has "Needtobreathe's signature Southern rock stomps circles 'round Bear Rinehart's distinct vocal for another 11-song feast that just might be their best yet." At Milwaukee Journal Sentinel, Piet Levy gave the album a positive review, writing that "the inspiration can be found in the beauty of its lyrics", and that when the band gets around to praising the Lord that "the effect is more powerful than anything on the latest albums from Christian acts like Casting Crowns, MercyMe, Chris Tomlin or TobyMac."

Timothy Monger of AllMusic rated the album three-and-a-half stars out of four, noting that "If Needtobreathe's intention was to deliver a more down-to-earth and reflective record following The Reckoning's big-budget glitz, they've succeeded." At New Release Tuesday, Kevin Davis rated the album a perfect five stars, writing that "Every song is absolutely amazing," and adding that “the very relatable and transparent words of these songs use poetic descriptions and biblical language throughout eleven stellar tracks". Kate Padilla of The Spencer Daily Reporter praised Bear's vocal tone, stating that, singling out a few standout tracks would be a shear lesson in futility because "The entire thing is great, from beginning to end and back again." At PopMatters, Jeff Koch rated the album five discs out of ten, cautioning how "these rivers run too shallow to irrigate this wasteland."

At Jesus Freak Hideout, four reviewers, Jen Rose, Jerrold Wallace, John DiBiase, and Timothy Estabrooks, all gave the same rating of four-and-a-half stars out of five. Rose says that the release "represents an already great band at their finest". Wallace writes that "The appropriately titled Rivers in the Wasteland is a tale of redemption and perseverance" because the band had its share of "ups and down," and that they have "pushed through and created some of their finest work to date." DiBiase remarked that the release "is a refreshing listening experience", while Estabrooks called the release simply "phenomenal."

At Christian Music Zine, Graeme Jones rated the album a perfect five stars, remarking how the release "doesn’t disappoint" because it is "quality musically and lyrically." Andrew Funderburk of CM Addict rated the album four stars out of five, stating that "It’s an album filled with strength down to the last track." At 365 Days of Inspiring Media, Jonathan Andre rated the album four stars out of five, writing how it is "a gem of an album". Timothy Yap of Hallels gave the album a modestly positive review, saying while some songs on the release don't work well that "Gone are the thinly cloaked inspirational songs, and moving right in are songs that penetrate from the superficial to the eternal."

=== Commercial performance ===
Rivers in the Wasteland debuted at No. 3 on the US Billboard 200 chart, selling 49,000 copies in its first week of release. The sales were good enough for No. 1 on the Top Christian Albums and Top Rock Albums charts, and No. 6 on the Canadian Albums Chart. As of January 2015, the album has sold 150,000 copies in the US.

== Track listing ==
All tracks are written by Bear and Bo Rinehart.

No.	Title	Producer(s)	Length
1.	"Wasteland"	Needtobreathe	4:31
2.	"State I'm In"	Needtobreathe; Joe Chiccarelli; Kevin Augunas	3:19
3.	"Feet, Don't Fail Me Now"	Needtobreathe; Chiccarelli	3:45
4.	"Oh, Carolina"	Needtobreathe; Augunas	3:25
5.	"Difference Maker"	Needtobreathe; Chiccarelli	5:40
6.	"Rise Again"	Needtobreathe; Augunas	3:17
7.	"The Heart"	Needtobreathe; Chiccarelli; Jerrod Bettis	3:44
8.	"Where the Money Is"	Needtobreathe	3:22
9.	"Multiplied"	Needtobreathe; Ed Cash	4:35
10.	"Brother"	Needtobreathe; Cash	4:49
11.	"More Heart, Less Attack"	Needtobreathe; Chiccarelli	5:03
Total length:			45:29

Online B-side (NTB mailing list; Code handed out at NTB 2014 concerts)
No.	Title	Length
12.	"Say Please"	2:51

== Personnel ==
Credits adapted from AllMusic.

=== Needtobreathe ===
- Bear Rinehart – lead vocals, synthesizers, guitars, slide guitar
- Bo Rinehart – synthesizers, guitars, banjo, mandola, percussion, background vocals
- Seth Bolt – bass guitar, electric upright bass, percussion, backing vocals

=== Additional musicians ===
- Josh Lovelace – keyboards, organ, background vocals
- Roger Joseph Manning, Jr. – keyboards
- Ed Cash – acoustic piano, programming, electric guitar, bass guitar
- Jonathan Smith – programming, acoustic guitar, banjo
- Randall Harris – synthesizers, drums, percussion
- Scott Cash – acoustic guitar, electric guitar, background vocals
- Michael Trent – acoustic guitar, electric guitar, background vocals, additional arrangements
- Carl Broemel – lap steel guitar
- Paul Mabury – drums
- Jason Freese – saxophone
- Francisco Torres – trombone
- Ron Blake – trumpet
- Ivory Layne – background vocals

=== Technical ===
- Seth Bolt – engineering (tracks 1–9, 11), mixing (tracks 1, 2, 7)
- Randall Harris – engineering (tracks 1, 2, 5–9), mixing (tracks 1, 2), additional engineering
- Lowell Reynolds – engineering (tracks 2, 3, 5, 7, 11)
- Clif Norrell – engineering (tracks 2, 4, 6)
- Gavin Paddock – engineering (tracks 2, 4, 6)
- Bo Rinehart – mixing (tracks 2, 7)
- Ryan Hewitt – mixing (tracks 3–6, 11)
- Joe Chiccarelli – engineering (track 5)
- Mikey Reaves – engineering (tracks 6, 7, 11)
- Ed Cash – engineering, mixing (tracks 9, 10)
- Neil B. Young – additional engineering (track 2), engineer (track 6)
- Scott Cash – additional engineering (tracks 9, 10)
- David Leonard – additional engineering (track 9)
- Ben Levy – mixing assistance (tracks 3–6, 11)
- Roman Urazov – mixing assistance (tracks 3–6, 11)
- Bob Ludwig – mastering at Gateway Mastering (Portland, Maine)
- Pete Ganbarg – A&R

=== Design ===
- Fuller Moehagen for AKT – layout
- Bo Rinehart – art direction, design
- Bryan Nash Gills – woodcut imagery
- Sully Sullivan – photography

== Charts ==
=== Weekly charts ===
Chart (2014)	Peak position
Canadian Albums (Billboard)	6
UK Albums (OCC)	171
US Billboard 200	3
US Top Alternative Albums (Billboard)	1
US Top Christian Albums (Billboard)	1
US Digital Albums (Billboard)	3
US Top Rock Albums (Billboard)	1

=== Year-end charts ===
Chart (2014)	Position
US Billboard 200	157
US Top Alternative Albums (Billboard)	28
US Top Christian Albums (Billboard)	5
US Top Rock Albums (Billboard)	31

=== Singles ===
Single	Year	Peak chart positions
Single	Year	US Christian
"The Heart"	2014	13
"Difference Maker"	2014	16
"State I'm In"	2014	11
"Wasteland"	2014	4
"Multiplied"	2014	4
"Brother"	2015	1
