= Sittin' in the Lap of Luxury =

1990 single by Louie Louie

Single by Louie Louie

from the album The State I'm In
- B-side: "Rodeo Clown"
- Released: 1990
- Genre: Pop rock; R&B; new jack swing
- Length: 4:04
- Label: WTG; Epic
- Songwriters: Louis Cordero; Les Pierce
- Producers: Frankie Blue; Les Pierce

Louie Louie singles chronology
"The Girl Who Seduced the World" (1987)	"Sittin' in the Lap of Luxury" (1990)	"I Wanna Get Back with You" (1990)

Music video
- "Sittin' in the Lap of Luxury" on YouTube

"Sittin' in the Lap of Luxury" is a song co-written and performed by Puerto Rican musician Louie Louie. It was issued in 1990 by WTG and Epic Records, as the lead single from his debut studio album, The State I'm In (1990). The song is written by Louie with Les Pierce, who produced it with Frankie Blue. It became his only top 40 hit on the US Billboard Hot 100 and Cash Box Top 100 charts, peaking at numbers 18 and 19. The accompanying music video was directed by American director Michael Bay.

== Charts ==
Chart performance for "Sittin' in the Lap of Luxury"
Chart (1990)	Peak position
Australia (ARIA)	51
Canada Top Singles (RPM)	34
US Billboard Hot 100	19
US Dance Music/Club Play Singles (Billboard)	11
US Hot Dance Music/Maxi-Singles Sales (Billboard)	17
US Hot R&B/Hip-Hop Singles & Tracks (Billboard)	74
US Cash Box Top 100	18
