= God So Loved =

2020 single by We the Kingdom

Single by We the Kingdom

from the album Holy Water
- Released: May 29, 2020
- Recorded: 2019–2020
- Genre: Contemporary Christian music
- Length: 4:24; 5:20 (World Version)
- Label: Capitol CMG
- Songwriters: Ed Cash; Scott Cash; Franni Cash; Martin Cash; Andrew Bergthold
- Producer: We the Kingdom

We the Kingdom singles chronology
"Don't Tread on Me" (2020)	"God So Loved" (2020)	"Light of the World (Sing Hallelujah)" (2020)

Music videos
- "God So Loved" (Acoustic) on YouTube
- "God So Loved" (Live) on YouTube
- "God So Loved" (Lyrics) on YouTube
- "God So Loved" (Storybrook Sessions) on YouTube
- "God So Loved" (World Version) on YouTube

"God So Loved" is a song by We the Kingdom that was released as the fourth single from their debut studio album, Holy Water (2020), on May 29, 2020. The song was written by Ed Cash, Scott Cash, Franni Cash, Martin Cash, and Andrew Bergthold.

"God So Loved" became We the Kingdom's second top ten entry on the US Hot Christian Songs chart, having peaked at No. 4. "God So Loved" received a nomination for the GMA Dove Award Worship Recorded Song of the Year at the 2021 GMA Dove Awards.

== Background ==
We the Kingdom initially released the live performance version of "God So Loved" on October 25, 2019, as part of their debut extended play, Live at the Wheelhouse. An acoustic version of the song by the band was released on the Live Acoustic Sessions EP on March 6, 2020. The studio version of "God So Loved" then followed on May 29, 2020, as the third single from Holy Water (2020).

We the Kingdom shared the story behind the song, saying:

We’ve spent the last two years refining this song that has grown so dear to our hearts. We’ve worked on multiple versions that have been stepping stones along the journey to where it has ended up, and while we loved the journey, we are so excited to have finished the recording and that it’s finally out. The world feels so fractured right now, and we are grateful to have a Savior who understands and enters into this brokenness. We believe in Jesus, and we believe that He is the only hope for the world. He came for both the victim and villain inside us all, and He beckons us to the foot of the Cross where He welcomes us with open arms.

— We the Kingdom, Instagram

On October 8, 2020, We the Kingdom released a new rendition of the song dubbed "God So Loved (World Version)" featuring Ayrton Day, Markus Fackler, Palankin, Victory Worship, André Aquino, NV Worship, and Veronika Lohmer, as a single.

== Composition ==
"God So Loved" is composed in the key of B♭ with a moderate rock tempo of 100 beats per minute and a musical time signature of 4/4. The singers' vocal range spans from F_{3} to D_{5}.

== Accolades ==
Awards
Year	Organization	Award	Result	Ref
2021	GMA Dove Awards	Worship Recorded Song of the Year	Nominated	

== Chart performance ==
"God So Loved" made its debut at No. 33 on the US Hot Christian Songs chart dated June 13, 2020, following its commercial release. The song broke through to the top ten sector of the chart at No. 9 on the September 5, 2020-dated chart, after thirteen weeks appearing on the chart. The song has since peaked at No. 5.

"God So Loved" debuted on the US Christian Airplay at No. 46, on the chart dated June 27, 2020. It spent seventeen weeks on the chart before reaching No. 1 on the October 17, 2020-dated chart.

== Music videos ==
We the Kingdom released the live audio video of "God So Loved" on October 24, 2019. An acoustic performance video of "Holy Water" at the Boiler Room at Neuhoff Site, Nashville, Tennessee, was published on YouTube on the same day. We the Kingdom released the lyric video of "God So Loved" on May 30, 2020. The Storybrooke Sessions video was released to YouTube on June 9, 2020. The live music video of the song, recorded at Young Life Sharptop Cove in Jasper, Georgia, was released on June 19, 2020, on YouTube. On October 8, 2020, We the Kingdom released the World Version music video featuring Ayrton Day, Markus Fackler, Palankin, Victory Worship, André Aquino, NV Worship, and Veronika Lohmer was released to YouTube.

== Track listing ==
"God So Loved"
No.	Title	Writer(s)	Length
1.	"God So Loved"	Ed Cash; Scott Cash; Franni Cash; Martin Cash; Andrew Bergthold	4:24

"God So Loved" (World Version)
No.	Title	Length
1.	"God So Loved" (World Version; featuring Ayrton Day, Markus Fackler, Palankin, Victory Worship, André Aquino, NV Worship and Veronika Lohmer)	5:20

== Charts ==
=== Weekly charts ===
Weekly chart performance for "God So Loved"
Chart (2019–2020)	Peak position
US Hot Christian Songs (Billboard)	4
US Christian Airplay (Billboard)	1
US Christian AC (Billboard)	2

=== Year-end charts ===
Year-end chart performance for "God So Loved"
Chart (2020)	Position
US Christian Songs (Billboard)	24
US Christian Airplay (Billboard)	19
US Christian AC (Billboard)	19
Chart (2021)	Position
US Christian Songs (Billboard)	74
US Christian Airplay (Billboard)	39

== Certifications ==
Region	Certification	Certified units/sales
United States (RIAA)	Gold	500,000^{‡}
^{‡} Sales+streaming figures based on certification alone.

== Release history ==
Region	Date	Version	Format	Label	Ref.
Various	May 29, 2020	Studio	Digital download; streaming	Capitol Christian Music Group	
Various	October 8, 2020	World Version (featuring Ayrton Day, Markus Fackler, Palankin, Victory Worship, André Aquino, NV Worship and Veronika Lohmer)	Digital download; streaming	Capitol Christian Music Group	
