= Holy Water (We the Kingdom song) =

Single by We the Kingdom

from the album Live at the Wheelhouse and Holy Water
- Released: September 13, 2019
- Recorded: 2019
- Genre: CCM, worship, folk, Americana
- Length: 4:02 (studio version); 7:44 (Church Sessions); 3:41 (radio edit)
- Label: Capitol CMG
- Songwriters: Ed Cash; Scott Cash; Franni Cash; Martin Cash; Andrew Bergthold
- Producer: We the Kingdom

We the Kingdom singles chronology
"Dancing on the Waves" (2019)	"Holy Water" (2019)	"Christmas Day" (2019)

Music videos
- "Holy Water" (Acoustic) on YouTube
- "Holy Water" (Church Sessions) on YouTube
- "Holy Water" (Live) on YouTube
- "Holy Water" (Lyrics) on YouTube

"Holy Water" is a song by We the Kingdom that was released as the second single from their debut extended play, Live at the Wheelhouse (2019) and Holy Water (2020), on September 13, 2019. The song was written by Ed Cash, Scott Cash, Franni Cash, Martin Cash, and Andrew Bergthold.

"Holy Water" became We the Kingdom's debut entry on the US Hot Christian Songs chart, having peaked at No. 2. The song is also the highest-charting song of their career, having peaked at No. 6 on Billboard's Bubbling Under Hot 100 chart. "Holy Water" was nominated for the GMA Dove Awards for Song of the Year and Pop/Contemporary Recorded Song of the Year and at the 2020 GMA Dove Awards. "Holy Water" has garnered a Grammy Award nomination for Best Contemporary Christian Music Performance/Song at the 2021 Grammy Awards.

== Background ==
"Holy Water" was released by We the Kingdom on September 13, 2019, as the second single from Live at the Wheelhouse (2019), in the lead-up to its release, which was slated for October 25, 2019. Ed Cash shared the story behind the song, saying:

The whole heart of the song is about the power of forgiveness and what it really means to be forgiven by God. I’ve actually been reading Romans the past few days and just have been in awe of the way that Paul talks so openly about his own sin. He has such a reverence for God and talks about should we then abuse grace since grace is plentiful? By no means. The bridge to the song says, ‘I don’t want to abuse Your grace. God, I need it every day. It’s the only thing that ever really makes me want to change.’ To me it just depicts that hey I want to be changed by the spirit of God.

An acoustic version of the song by the band was released on the Live Acoustic Sessions EP on March 6, 2020. On March 20, 2020, We the Kingdom and Tasha Cobbs Leonard released a new rendition of the song dubbed "Holy Water (Church Sessions)" as a single.

== Composition ==
"Holy Water" is composed in the key of D with a moderate rock tempo of 73 beats per minute and a musical time signature of 4/4. The singers' vocal range spans from C_{4} to C_{5}.

== Chart performance ==
"Holy Water" debuted on the US Christian Airplay at No. 45, on the chart dated August 27, 2019. It spent 29 weeks on the chart before reaching No. 1 on the March 14, 2020-dated chart, having attained significant gains in radio airplay. On the US Hot Christian Songs, the song made its debut at No. 31 on the chart dated September 28, 2019, following its commercial release. The song peaked at No. 2 on the February 8, 2020-dated chart, 20 weeks after its debut.

== Music videos ==
We the Kingdom released the lyric video of "Holy Water" on September 13, 2019. The live music video of the song, recorded at Young Life Sharptop Cove in Jasper, Georgia, was released on October 1, 2019, on YouTube. An acoustic performance video of "Holy Water" at the Boiler Room at Neuhoff Site, Nashville, Tennessee, was published on YouTube on January 2, 2020. The Church Sessions video featuring Tasha Cobbs Leonard with an appearance by Maverick City Music was released on March 20, 2020.

== Accolades ==
Awards
Year	Organization	Award	Result	Ref
2020	GMA Dove Awards	Song of the Year	Nominated	
2020	GMA Dove Awards	Pop/Contemporary Recorded Song of the Year	Nominated	
2021	Grammy Awards	Best Contemporary Christian Music Performance/Song	Nominated	

== Track listing ==
"Holy Water"
No.	Title	Writer(s)	Length
1.	"Holy Water"	Ed Cash; Scott Cash; Franni Cash; Martin Cash; Andrew Bergthold	4:02

"Holy Water" (Church Sessions) — We the Kingdom and Tasha Cobbs Leonard
No.	Title	Length
1.	"Holy Water" (Church Sessions)	7:44
2.	"Holy Water" (Church Sessions; Music Video)	7:48

== Charts ==
=== Weekly charts ===
Weekly chart performance for "Holy Water"
Chart (2019–2020)	Peak position
US Bubbling Under Hot 100 (Billboard)	6
US Hot Christian Songs (Billboard)	2
US Christian Airplay (Billboard)	1
US Digital Song Sales (Billboard)	30

=== Year-end charts ===
Year-end chart performance for "Holy Water"
Chart (2019)	Position
US Christian Songs (Billboard)	91
Chart (2020)	Position
US Christian Songs (Billboard)	2
US Christian Airplay (Billboard)	1
US Christian AC (Billboard)	3
US (WAY-FM)	7

== Certifications ==
Region	Certification	Certified units/sales
United States (RIAA)	Platinum	1,000,000^{‡}
^{‡} Sales+streaming figures based on certification alone.

== Release history ==
Region	Date	Version	Format	Label	Ref.
Various	September 13, 2019	Studio	Digital download; streaming	Capitol Christian Music Group	
Various	March 20, 2020	Church Sessions (with Tasha Cobbs Leonard)	Digital download; streaming	Capitol Christian Music Group	
