= Holy Water (We the Kingdom album) =

Studio album by We the Kingdom
- Released: August 7, 2020
- Recorded: 2019–2020
- Genre: CCM; contemporary worship; folk; Americana
- Length: 53:13
- Label: Capitol CMG; Sparrow
- Producer: We the Kingdom

We the Kingdom chronology
Live Acoustic Sessions (2020)	Holy Water (2020)	The Awakening (2020)

Alternative cover
- Deluxe cover

Singles from Holy Water
- 1. "Dancing on the Waves" Released: August 16, 2019; 2. "Holy Water" Released: September 13, 2019; 3. "Don't Tread on Me" Released: April 24, 2020; 4. "God So Loved" Released: May 29, 2020; 5. "Child of Love" Released: January 29, 2021

Holy Water is the debut studio album by American contemporary Christian music band We the Kingdom, which was released via Capitol Christian Music Group on August 7, 2020. The album features guest appearance by Bethel Music, Tasha Cobbs Leonard, Maverick City Music, and Bear Rinehart.

The album was preceded by the release of "Dancing on the Waves", "Holy Water", "Don't Tread on Me", "God So Loved", and "Child of Love" as singles. "Holy Water" went on to become the band's breakthrough hit, peaking at No. 2 on the Hot Christian Songs chart. "Don't Tread on Me" peaked at No. 40 on Hot Christian Songs. "God So Loved" was the band's second Hot Christian Songs top ten single, peaking at No. 4.

Holy Water achieved commercial success in the United States, the album having debuted at No. 4 on Billboard's Top Christian Albums Chart. Holy Water has garnered a Grammy Award nomination for Best Contemporary Christian Music Album at the 2021 Grammy Awards. The album won the GMA Dove Award Pop/Contemporary Album of the Year at the 2021 GMA Dove Awards.

== Release and promotion ==
=== Singles ===
"Dancing on the Waves" was released as the first single from the album on August 16, 2019. "Holy Water" was released on September 13, 2019, as the second single from the album. The song was the band's breakthrough hit single, peaking at number six on the US Bubbling Under Hot 100 Singles chart, number two on Hot Christian Songs chart, and number one on Christian Airplay. On April 24, 2020, "Don't Tread on Me" was released as the third single from the album. "Don't Tread on Me" peaked at number 40 on the Hot Christian Songs Chart. "God So Loved" was released as the fourth single from the album on May 29, 2020. "God So Loved" peaked at number five on Hot Christian Songs chart, and number one on the Christian Airplay chart.

=== Promotional singles ===
On July 3, 2020, We the Kingdom released "Child of Love" as the first promotional single from the album, concurrently launching the album's pre-order. "No Doubt About It" was released as the second promotional single from the album on July 24, 2020.

== Reception ==
=== Critical response ===
Professional ratings
Review scores
Source	Rating
365 Days of Inspiring Media	4.5/5
CCM Magazine	4/5 stars
Jesus Freak Hideout	4/5 stars

In a positive review from 365 Days of Inspiring Media, Joshua Andre lauded We the Kingdom for being "extremely good" on their debut project, and remarked the band "is probably the most energetic band since Rend Collective." CCM Magazine's Ross Cluver gave a favourable review of the album, describing it as "one of the strongest worship projects so far this year." NewReleaseToday's Grace Chaves praised the album, describing it as "fresh and different" compared to other worship albums, and the overall impact being "powerful and beautiful in so many ways." Jesus Freak Hideout's Alex Caldwell says in his four star review: "Holy Water is a refreshing album for these troubled times, and a reminder that the author of all things created music in all of its forms."

=== Accolades ===
Awards
Year	Organization	Award	Result	Ref
2021	Grammy Awards	Best Contemporary Christian Music Album	Nominated	
2021	Billboard Music Awards	Top Christian Album	Nominated	
2021	GMA Dove Awards	Pop/Contemporary Album of the Year	Won	

== Commercial performance ==
In the United States, Holy Water debuted at number four on the Billboard's Top Christian Albums Chart dated August 22, 2020. concurrently debuting and on the Top Album Sales at No. 55.

== Track listing ==
All songs were written by We the Kingdom (Ed Cash, Scott Cash, Franni Cash, Andrew Bergthold and Martin Cash), except where noted.

Holy Water — Standard edition
No.	Title	Writer(s)	Length
1.	"Cages"	Ed Cash; Scott Cash; Franni Cash; Andrew Bergthold; Martin Cash; Kyle Briskin	3:35
2.	"Waking Up"		5:16
3.	"Child of Love"		4:10
4.	"Dancing on the Waves"	E. Cash; S. Cash; F. Cash; Bergthold; M. Cash; K. Briskin	4:29
5.	"Holy Water"		4:02
6.	"No Doubt About It"	E. Cash; S. Cash; F. Cash; Bergthold; M. Cash; K. Briskin	4:47
7.	"God So Loved"		4:25
8.	"Peace" (with Bethel Music)	E. Cash	4:57
9.	"Don't Tread on Me"		4:00
10.	"SOS"	E. Cash	4:38
11.	"If All I Had Was Christ"	E. Cash; S. Cash; F. Cash; Bergthold; M. Cash; K. Briskin	4:08
12.	"You Are Heaven"		4:46
Total length:			53:13

Holy Water — Apple Music standard edition bonus content
No.	Title	Length
13.	"Holy Water" (Live At Young Life Sharptop Cove, Jasper, GA/2018; Music Video)	4:43
14.	"God So Loved" (Live At Young Life Sharptop Cove, Jasper, GA/2018; Music Video)	4:23
15.	"Dancing on the Waves" (Live At Young Life Sharptop Cove, Jasper, GA/2018; Music Video)	4:26
Total length:		66:41

Holy Water — Deluxe edition
No.	Title	Length
13.	"Take Me On a Ride"	4:29
14.	"Holy Water" (Church Sessions; with Tasha Cobbs Leonard)	7:44
15.	"Dancing on the Waves" (Live at the Wheelhouse)	4:28
16.	"Don't Tread on Me" (Live)	3:55
17.	"God So Loved" (Acoustic/Recorded Live At Boiler Room At Neuhoff Site, Nashville, TN)	4:05
18.	"No Doubt About It" (Live in Studio; featuring Maverick City Music)	4:54
19.	"Waking Up" (Live in Studio)	5:49
20.	"Child of Love" (Live in Studio; featuring Maverick City Music)	4:17

Holy Water — Apple Music deluxe bonus content
No.	Title	Length
21.	"Holy Water" (Church Sessions; with Tasha Cobbs Leonard; Music Video)	7:48
22.	"Dancing On The Waves" (Live At Young Life Sharptop Cove, Jasper, GA/2018; Music Video)	4:26
23.	"Don't Tread on Me" (Live At Young Life Sharptop Cove, Jasper, GA/2018; Music Video)	3:55
24.	"God So Loved" (Acoustic/Recorded Live At Boiler Room At Neuhoff Site, Nashville, TN; Music Video)	4:10
25.	"No Doubt About It" (featuring Maverick City Music; Live in Nashville, TN/2020; Music Video)	4:48
26.	"Waking Up" (Live in Nashville, TN/2020; Music Video)	5:44
27.	"Child of Love" (featuring Maverick City Music; Live in Nashville, TN/2020; Music Video)	4:31

Holy Water — Deluxe edition re-release
No.	Title	Length
13.	"Take Me On a Ride"	4:29
14.	"Child of Love" (featuring Bear Rinehart of Needtobreathe)	4:29
15.	"Holy Water" (Church Sessions; with Tasha Cobbs Leonard)	7:44
16.	"Dancing on the Waves" (Live at the Wheelhouse)	4:28
17.	"Don't Tread on Me" (Live)	3:55
18.	"God So Loved" (Acoustic/Recorded Live At Boiler Room At Neuhoff Site, Nashville, TN)	4:05
19.	"No Doubt About It" (Live in Studio; featuring Maverick City Music)	4:54
20.	"Waking Up" (Live in Studio)	5:49
21.	"Child of Love" (Live in Studio; featuring Maverick City Music)	4:17

Holy Water — Apple Music deluxe bonus content Re-release
No.	Title	Length
22.	"Holy Water" (Church Sessions; with Tasha Cobbs Leonard; Music Video)	7:48
23.	"Dancing On The Waves" (Live At Young Life Sharptop Cove, Jasper, GA/2018; Music Video)	4:26
24.	"Don't Tread on Me" (Live At Young Life Sharptop Cove, Jasper, GA/2018; Music Video)	3:55
25.	"God So Loved" (Acoustic/Recorded Live At Boiler Room At Neuhoff Site, Nashville, TN; Music Video)	4:10
26.	"No Doubt About It" (featuring Maverick City Music; Live in Nashville, TN/2020; Music Video)	4:48
27.	"Waking Up" (Live in Nashville, TN/2020; Music Video)	5:44
28.	"Child of Love" (featuring Maverick City Music; Live in Nashville, TN/2020; Music Video)	4:31

- Songwriting credits adapted from PraiseCharts.

== Personnel ==
We the Kingdom

- Ed Cash – lead vocals, acoustic guitars
- Franni Cash – lead vocals, acoustic piano
- Andrew Bergthold – acoustic piano, programming, mandolin, backing vocals
- Scott Cash – acoustic guitars, electric guitars, mandolin, backing vocals
- Martin Cash – drums, percussion, programming, backing vocals

Additional musicians

- Kyle Briskin – bass (11)

Choir (Tracks 1, 3, 6 & 10)

- Jamiah Hudson, Jordan Holland, Savannah Jamison, Margo Patton, Melody Sheppard and Shannon Sanders

== Charts ==
=== Weekly charts ===
Chart (2020)	Peak position
US Christian Albums (Billboard)	4
US Top Album Sales (Billboard)	55

=== Year-end charts ===
Year-end chart performance for Holy Water
Chart (2020)	Position
US Christian Albums (Billboard)	51
Chart (2021)	Position
US Christian Albums (Billboard)	11
Chart (2022)	Position
US Christian Albums (Billboard)	26
Chart (2023)	Position
US Christian Albums (Billboard)	37
Chart (2025)	Position
US Christian Albums (Billboard)	40

== Release history ==
Region	Date	Version	Format(s)	Label(s)	Ref.
Various	Standard	August 7, 2020	CD; digital download; streaming	Capitol Christian Music Group	
Various	Deluxe	January 8, 2021	Digital download; streaming	Capitol Christian Music Group	
Various	Deluxe (Re-release)	January 29, 2021	Digital download; streaming	Capitol Christian Music Group	
