= Dancing on the Waves =

2019 single by We the Kingdom

- Live version cover

Single by We the Kingdom

from the album Live at the Wheelhouse and Holy Water
- Released: August 16, 2019
- Recorded: 2019
- Genre: Contemporary Christian music
- Length: 4:29 (live version); 4:26 (radio version)
- Label: Capitol CMG
- Songwriters: Ed Cash; Scott Cash; Franni Cash; Martin Cash; Andrew Bergthold; Kyle Briskin
- Producer: We the Kingdom

We the Kingdom singles chronology
"Dancing on the Waves" (2019)	"Holy Water" (2019)

Radio version
- Radio version cover

Music videos
- "Dancing on the Waves" (Acoustic) on YouTube
- "Dancing on the Waves" (Live) on YouTube
- "Dancing on the Waves" (Lyrics) on YouTube

"Dancing on the Waves" is a song by We the Kingdom that was released as the lead single from their debut extended play, Live at the Wheelhouse (2019) and Holy Water (2020), on August 16, 2019. The song was written by Andrew Bergthold, Ed Cash, Franni Cash, Kyle Briskin, Martin Cash, and Scott Cash.

"Dancing on the Waves" peaked at No. 29 on the US Hot Christian Songs chart.

== Background ==
The live version of "Dancing on the Waves" was released on August 16, 2019, as the first single from We the Kingdom. The track appeared on the group's debut EP, Live at the Wheelhouse, released in October 2019. An acoustic version of the song by the band was released on the Live Acoustic Sessions EP on March 6, 2020. On August 7, 2020, We the Kingdom released a studio-recorded version of the song on their debut album, Holy Water (2020). On September 10, 2021, We the Kingdom released the radio version of the song as a single.

== Composition ==
"Dancing on the Waves" is composed in the key of E with a moderate rock tempo of 97 beats per minute and a musical time signature of 6/8. The singers' vocal range spans from G♯_{3} to C♯_{5}.

== Commercial performance ==
"Dancing on the Waves" debuted at No. 48 on the US Christian Airplay chart.

== Music videos ==
The live music video of "Dancing on the Waves", recorded at Sharptop Cove - A Young Life Camp, in Jasper, Georgia, was released by We the Kingdom on August 16, 2019, on YouTube. An acoustic performance video of the song recorded at the Boiler Room at Neuhoff Site, Nashville, Tennessee, was published on YouTube on November 7, 2019. On August 7, 2020, We the Kingdom released an audio video of the song showcasing the Holy Water cover art. We the Kingdom released the lyric video for the radio version of "Dancing on the Waves" on September 10, 2021.

== Track listing ==
"Dancing on the Waves (Live)"
No.	Title	Writer(s)	Length
1.	"Dancing on the Waves" (Live at the Wheelhouse)	Ed Cash; Scott Cash; Franni Cash; Andrew Bergthold; Martin Cash; Kyle Briskin	4:29

"Dancing on the Waves (Radio Version)"
No.	Title	Length
1.	"Dancing on the Waves" (Radio version)	4:26

== Charts ==
=== Weekly charts ===
Weekly chart performance for "Dancing on the Waves"
Chart (2021–2022)	Peak position
US Hot Christian Songs (Billboard)	29
US Christian Airplay (Billboard)	23
US Christian AC (Billboard)	21

=== Year-end charts ===
Year-end chart performance for "Dancing on the Waves"
Chart (2022)	Position
US Christian Songs (Billboard)	75

== Release history ==
Release dates and formats for "Dancing on the Waves"
Region	Date	Version	Format	Label	Ref.
Various	August 16, 2019	Live	Digital download; streaming	Sparrow; Capitol CMG	
Various	September 10, 2021	Radio	Digital download; streaming	Sparrow; Capitol CMG	
United States	September 17, 2021	Radio	Christian radio	Sparrow; Capitol CMG	

== Other versions ==
- Bethel Music and We the Kingdom performed a rendition of song which was released as part of Bethel Music's album, Peace (2020).
