= Wasteland (Needtobreathe song) =

Single by Needtobreathe

from the album Rivers in the Wasteland
- Released: April 1, 2014
- Length: 4:30
- Label: Atlantic, Word, Curb
- Songwriters: Bear Rinehart, Bo Rinehart, Mark Savage
- Producer: Needtobreathe

Needtobreathe singles chronology
"State I'm In" (2014)	"Wasteland" (2014)	"Brother" (2015)

"Wasteland" is the fourth single from Needtobreathe's fifth studio album, Rivers in the Wasteland. It was released on April 1, 2014, by Atlantic Records, Word Records and Curb Records in anticipation of the album's release, and the song were written by Bear and Bo Rinehart and Mark Savage. On May 3, 2014, the band performed the song "Wasteland" on CBS This Morning: Saturday. The song was sent to Christian AC radio stations on September 22, 2015.

== Track listing ==
Track list
No.	Title	Length
1.	"Wasteland"	4:30
Total length:		4:30

== Weekly charts ==
Chart (2014–2015)	Peak position
Alternative Digital Songs (Billboard)	11
Christian Songs (Billboard)	4
Christian Airplay (Billboard)	29
Rock Songs (Billboard)	22
