= We the Kingdom (album) =

Studio album by We the Kingdom
- Released: September 16, 2022
- Studio: Kingdom Studios (Franklin, Tennessee)
- Genre: CCM; contemporary worship
- Length: 47:13
- Label: Capitol CMG
- Producer: We the Kingdom

We the Kingdom chronology
A Family Christmas (2021)	We the Kingdom (2022)	Live from the Ryman (2023)

Singles from We the Kingdom
- 1. "Miracle Power" Released: May 27, 2022; 2. "Jesus Does" Released: April 7, 2023

We the Kingdom is the second studio album by American contemporary Christian music band We the Kingdom, which was released via Capitol Christian Music Group on September 16, 2022.

The album was supported by the release of "Miracle Power" and "Jesus Does" as singles. "Miracle Power" peaked at No. 15 on the US Hot Christian Songs chart. "Jesus Does" peaked at No. 9 on the Hot Christian Songs chart. "Left It in the Water" and "God Is on the Throne" were later released as promotional singles, and peaked at No. 49 and No. 42 on the Hot Christian Songs chart respectively. The band will further promote the album by the We the Kingdom Live Tour in the fall of 2022.

We the Kingdom achieved commercial success in the United States, the album having debuted at No. 2 on Billboard's Top Christian Albums chart.

== Background ==
On May 27, 2022, We the Kingdom released "Miracle Power" as a single, revealing that the song was the lead single to their forthcoming second studio album. On July 29, 2022, We the Kingdom announced on Fox & Friends as part of the All-American Summer Concert Series at Fox Square that they would be releasing their self-titled album on September 16, 2022.

== Release and promotion ==
=== Singles ===
"Miracle Power" was released on May 27, 2022, as the lead single from the album, accompanied with its live music video. "Miracle Power" was released to Christian radio stations in the United States on June 24, 2022. "Miracle Power" peaked at No. 15 on the US Hot Christian Songs chart.

"Jesus Does" was released as the second single from the album on April 7, 2023. "Jesus Does" peaked at No. 9 on the Hot Christian Songs chart.

=== Promotional singles ===
"Left It in the Water" was released as the first promotional single from the albom on July 29, 2022. The music video for "Left It in the Water" was released on August 5, 2022. "Left It in the Water" peaked at No. 49 on the Hot Christian Songs chart.

"God Is on the Throne" was released as the second promotional single from the album on August 26, 2022. The song eventually peaked at No. 42 on the Hot Christian Songs Chart.

=== Performances ===
On July 29, 2022, We the Kingdom performed "Left It in the Water" on Fox & Friends as part of the All-American Summer Concert Series at Fox Square.

== Touring ==
On June 21, 2022, We the Kingdom announced that they will be headlining their own tour, billed as We the Kingdom Live Tour, with Cory Asbury in the fall of 2022. Spanning 22 cities, the tour began on September 29 at Countryside Christian in Tampa, Florida, and concluded on November 6 at Coca-Cola Roxy in Atlanta, Georgia.

== Reception ==
=== Critical response ===
Professional ratings
Review scores
Source	Rating
Jesus Freak Hideout	4/5 stars
JubileeCast	4/5

Jesus Freak Hideout's Alex Caldwell wrote a largely positive review of the album, saying: "We the Kingdom is a thrilling ride that will quicken your pulse and move your feet and soul. Here's to authentic music and hearts that want to sing about their Savior." Reviewing for JubileeCast, Timothy Yap said We The Kingdom "may be their best record to date," further explaining, "While some of their previous cuts then to be unsolicitous, the compositions here are generally more thoughtful, nuanced, and controlled." In a NewReleaseToday review, Selena Schulz gave a positive review of the album, saying "Not only is this the best record from We The Kingdom so far, it's also going on my top three list for the best albums ever," further adding "We the Kingdom will always hold a special place in my heart because of their unique sound and even within the few days this album has been out, I felt that gratitude and love growing even more. There's not a single part of this album that I don't like and I absolutely can't wait to see this music live; I hope you enjoy it just as much as I did."

=== Accolades ===
Year-end lists
Publication	Accolade	Rank	Ref.
Jesus Freak Hideout	2022 Staff Picks: Chase Tremaine's Album Picks	5	
Jesus Freak Hideout	2022 Staff Picks: Alex Caldwell's Album Picks	9	

== Commercial performance ==
In the United States, We the Kingdom earned 5,000 equivalent album units in its first week of sales, and as a result debuted at No. 2 on the Billboard Top Christian Albums chart dated October 1, 2022, becoming We the Kingdom's top ten entry on the chart.

== Track listing ==
All songs were written by We the Kingdom (Ed Cash, Scott Cash, Franni Cash, Andrew Bergthold and Martin Cash), except where noted.

We the Kingdom — CD
No.	Title	Writer(s)	Length
1.	"Left It in the Water"	Franni Cash; Ed Cash; Scott Cash; Andrew Bergthold; Martin Cash; Jeremy Gifford	4:11
2.	"Mine"		3:49
3.	"Jesus Does"	F. Cash; E. Cash; S. Cash; A. Bergthold; M. Cash; Kyle Briskin	3:54
4.	"God Is on the Throne"	F. Cash; E. Cash; S. Cash; A. Bergthold; M. Cash; Glynn Dollison	4:44
5.	"Deep End"		3:00
6.	"Miracle Power"		4:37
7.	"Tabernacle"		4:09
8.	"Life Is Good"		2:53
9.	"Count the Stars (Be There For You)"		4:06
10.	"If I Gave You My Heart"		4:04
11.	"The Veil"		3:47
12.	"Family"		3:53
Total length:			47:13

We the Kingdom — Digital bonus track
No.	Title	Length
13.	"Left It in the Water" (Edit)	3:34
Total length:		50:48

== Charts ==
=== Weekly charts ===
Weekly chart performance for We the Kingdom
Chart (2022)	Peak position
US Christian Albums (Billboard)	2
US Top Album Sales (Billboard)	21

=== Year-end charts ===
Year-end chart performance for We the Kingdom
Chart (2022)	Position
US Christian Albums (Billboard)	70
Chart (2023)	Position
US Christian Albums (Billboard)	81

== Personnel ==
We the Kingdom

- Ed Cash – lead vocals, backing vocals, keyboards, programming, acoustic guitars, electric guitars, bass
- Franni Cash – lead vocals, backing vocals
- Andrew Bergthold – keyboards, programming, backing vocals, lead vocals (5)
- Scott Cash – acoustic guitars, electric guitars, backing vocals, lead vocals (10)
- Martin Cash – drums, percussion, programming, backing vocals

Additional musicians

- Jonathon Eley – acoustic piano (4)
- Glynn Dollison – Wurlitzer electric piano (4), organ (4)
- Jamiah Hudson – backing vocals
- Lauren McClinton – backing vocals

=== Production ===
- Josh Bailey – A&R
- We the Kingdom – producers, recording
- Ed Cash – mixing
- Joe LaPorta – mastering at Sterling Sound (Edgewater, New Jersey)
- Chad Chrisman – A&R administration
- Aaron Stearns – creative director, design
- Trent Nicholson – packaging
- Robby Klein – photography
- Round Table Management – management

== Release history ==
Region	Date	Format(s)	Label(s)	Ref.
Various	September 16, 2022	CD; digital download; streaming	Capitol Christian Music Group	
