= 1-2-3 (The Chimes song) =

1989 single by the Chimes

Single by the Chimes

from the album The Chimes
- Released: 7 August 1989
- Genre: Acid house
- Length: 3:25
- Label: CBS
- Songwriters: Pauline Henry, Mike Peden, James Locke
- Producers: Jazzie B, Nellee Hooper

The Chimes singles chronology
"1-2-3" (1989)	"Heaven" (1989)

Music video
- "1-2-3" on YouTube

"1-2-3" is a song by British dance music trio the Chimes, written by group members Pauline Henry, Mike Peden, and James Locke. Their debut single, "1-2-3" reached number one on the US Billboard Dance Club Play chart for two weeks and was their only Billboard Hot 100 hit, peaking at number 82. Although the song stalled at number 60 in the band's native United Kingdom, it found chart success in New Zealand, where it peaked at number four. In 1990, the song was included on their only album, The Chimes.

== Critical reception ==
Stewart Mason from AllMusic described the song as "meaty acid house". Paul Lester from Melody Maker felt it "is kinda uptempo, but it glides." A reviewer from Music & Media commented, "A muscular, square beat, a house-oriented piano and a soulful vocal delivery typify this chart-bound club record." Miranda Sawyer from Smash Hits noted Pauline Henry's "remarkable voice" and described the song as "classy" in her review of The Chimes.

== Charts ==
=== Weekly charts ===
Chart (1989–1990)	Peak position
Australia (ARIA)	73
Canada Dance/Urban (RPM)	7
Netherlands (Single Top 100)	41
New Zealand (Recorded Music NZ)	4
UK Singles (Official Charts)	60
US Billboard Hot 100	86
US 12-inch Singles Sales (Billboard) with "Underestimate"	14
US Dance Club Play (Billboard) with "Underestimate"	1
US Hot Black Singles (Billboard)	41
US Cash Box Top 100	82

=== Year-end charts ===
Chart (1990)	Position
US Dance Club Play (Billboard)	18
