= Live at the Wheelhouse =

EP by We the Kingdom
- Released: October 25, 2019
- Recorded: 2018
- Venue: SharpTop Cove - A Young Life Camp, Jasper, Georgia, U.S.
- Genre: CCM; contemporary worship; folk; Americana
- Length: 25:11
- Label: Capitol CMG; Sparrow
- Producer: We the Kingdom

We the Kingdom chronology
Live at the Wheelhouse (2019)	Live Acoustic Sessions (2020)

Singles from Live at the Wheelhouse
- 1. "Dancing on the Waves" Released: August 16, 2019; 2. "Holy Water" Released: September 13, 2019

Live at the Wheelhouse is the debut extended play by American contemporary Christian music band We the Kingdom, which was released via Capitol Christian Music Group on October 25, 2019.

The EP was preceded by the release of "Dancing on the Waves" and "Holy Water" as singles. The latter went on to become the band's breakthrough hit, peaking at No. 2 on the Hot Christian Songs chart.

The EP garnered mixed reactions from music critics but managed to attain commercial success having reached No 3 on the US Christian Albums chart.

== Background ==
The EP was recorded at Sharptop Cove, a Young Life Camp, in Jasper, Georgia. Franni Cash shared in an interview with Ross Cluver of CCM Magazine that the EP's name was developed from the name of the clubhouse at SharpTop called the wheelhouse, hence the name, Live at the Wheelhouse.

== Singles ==
"Dancing on the Waves" was released as the first single from Live at the Wheelhouse on August 16, 2019. "Holy Water" was released on September 13, 2019, as the second single from the EP. The song was the band's breakthrough hit single, peaking at No. 6 on the US Bubbling Under Hot 100 Singles chart, No. 2 on Hot Christian Songs chart, and No. 1 on Christian Airplay.

== Critical reception ==
Professional ratings
Review scores
Source	Rating
365 Days of Inspiring Media	4/5 stars
Hallels	2/5 stars

In a positive review from 365 Days of Inspiring Media, Joshua Andre lauded We the Kingdom for being "extremely good" on their debut project, and remarked the band "is probably the most energetic band since Rend Collective." Hallels' Timothy Yap gave a negative review of the EP, acknowledging that the band "straddled the tacit divide between raw expressions of worship and the polished stadium-filling explosions of praise well," but described some songs on the EP as being lyrically ambiguous.

=== Accolades ===
Awards
Year	Organization	Award	Result	Ref
2020	We Love Christian Music Awards	EP of the Year	Nominated	
2020	GMA Dove Awards	Pop/Contemporary Album of the Year	Nominated	

Year-end lists
Publication	Accolade	Rank	Ref.
365 Days of Inspiring Media	Top 20 EPs of 2019	6	

== Commercial performance ==
Over two months after its release, Live at the Wheelhouse debuted at No. 36 on the US Christian Albums chart dated January 6, 2020. In its eleventh appearance on the Christian chart, the EP peaked at No. 12 on March 21, 2020, while also registered on Heatseekers Albums Chart at No. 23. The EP surged to its No. 3 peak in its thirteenth week on the Christian Albums chart dated April 4, 2020, concurrently debuting and on the Top Album Sales at No. 52.

== Track listing ==
Live at the Wheelhouse
No.	Title	Writer(s)	Length
1.	"God So Loved"	Ed Cash; Scott Cash; Franni Cash; Andrew Bergthold; Martin Cash	4:12
2.	"Holy Water"	E. Cash; S. Cash; F. Cash; A. Bergthold; M. Cash	4:42
3.	"SOS"	E. Cash	4:33
4.	"Free, Amen"	E. Cash; S. Cash; F. Cash; A. Bergthold; M. Cash	4:23
5.	"Sing Wherever I Go"	E. Cash; S. Cash; F. Cash; A. Bergthold; M. Cash; Kyle Briskin	2:52
6.	"Dancing on the Waves"	E. Cash; S. Cash; F. Cash; A. Bergthold; M. Cash; K. Briskin	4:29
Total length:			25:11

- Songwriting credits adapted from PraiseCharts.

== Charts ==
=== Weekly charts ===
Weekly chart performance for Live at the Wheelhouse
Chart (2019–20)	Peak position
US Christian Albums (Billboard)	3
US Heatseekers Albums (Billboard)	23
US Top Album Sales (Billboard)	52

=== Year-end charts ===
Year-end chart performance for Live at the Wheelhouse
Chart (2020)	Position
US Christian Albums (Billboard)	32

== Release history ==
Region	Date	Format(s)	Label(s)	Ref.
Various	October 25, 2019	CD; digital download; streaming	Capitol Christian Music Group	
