= The Chimes (Scottish band) =

British dance music band

- Origin: Edinburgh, Scotland
- Labels: CBS
- Past members: Pauline Henry; Mike Peden; James Locke

The Chimes were a British dance music trio, which consisted of Pauline Henry (born in Jamaica) with Mike Peden and James Locke from Edinburgh, Scotland. They are best known for their hits "Heaven" and a remake of U2's "I Still Haven't Found What I'm Looking For", which became a UK top 10 hit.

== Chart success ==
In the US, they reached the Billboard Hot 100 with the song "1-2-3", at No. 86 in 1990. It spent two weeks at No. 1 on the U.S. Hot Dance Music/Club Play chart, and its follow-up, "Heaven", was also a No. 1 dance chart hit.

Bono from U2 commented that the Chimes' cover of their hit "I Still Haven't Found What I'm Looking For" was the "only cover version he had heard that he enjoyed and did the original justice", adding "at last someone's come along to sing it properly".

A self-titled album was released in 1990, reaching number 17 on the UK Albums Chart.

Pauline Henry has also enjoyed dance club success as a solo artist with five hits in the UK top 40, including "Feel Like Making Love", "Too Many People", "Can't Take Your Love", "Love Hangover" and "Never Knew Love Like This" (the latter featuring Wayne Marshall).

Henry performed at Bestival 2012 on the Isle of Wight with her band which included Bestival compere Scott Anderson on bass guitar.

== Discography ==
=== Albums ===
Title	Album details	Peak chart positions									Certifications
Title	Album details	UK	AUS	AUT	GER	NED	NZ	SWE	SWI	US	Certifications
The Chimes	Released: 1990; Formats: LP, cassette, CD; Label: CBS	17	16	20	30	37	3	36	32	162	UK: Silver; AUS: Gold

=== Singles ===
Year	Title	Peak chart positions										Album
Year	Title	UK	AUS	AUT	BEL (Fla)	GER	IRL	NED	NOR	NZ	US	Album
1989	"1-2-3"	60	73	—	—	—	—	41	—	4	86	The Chimes
1989	"Heaven"	66	62	—	—	—	—	34	—	5	—	The Chimes
1990	"I Still Haven't Found What I'm Looking For"	6	26	17	21	20	6	12	2	6	—	The Chimes
1990	"True Love"	48	106	—	—	—	—	42	—	—	—	The Chimes
1990	"Heaven" (re-issue)	24	103	—	—	—	25	—	—	—	—	The Chimes
1990	"Love Comes to Mind"	49	152	—	—	—	—	—	—	—	—	The Chimes
"—" denotes releases that did not chart or were not released.

== See also ==
- List of number-one dance hits (United States)
- List of artists who reached number one on the US Dance chart
