= Pauline Henry =

Jamaican-British singer (born 1961)

- Born: Pauline Deloris Henry; 29 January 1961 (age 65); Kingston, Jamaica
- Genres: Soul, dance, R&B
- Occupations: Singer, songwriter
- Years active: 1989–present
- Labels: CBS Records, Sony Soho^{2}, Universal
- Website: https://paulinehenry.com/

Pauline Henry (born 29 January 1961) is a Jamaican-British recording artist. She was the vocalist in the Scottish band the Chimes, best known for their 1990 cover version of U2's "I Still Haven't Found What I'm Looking For", between 1988 and 1991. Following her departure from the group, Henry embarked on a solo career, releasing her solo album, Pauline (1993), and achieved five UK top 40 singles between 1993 and 1996.

== Early life ==
Henry emigrated from Jamaica to the United Kingdom when she was 10 years old, and settled in London. Before commencing her recording career, she worked as a hair stylist and make-up artist, but also worked occasionally as a session singer.

== Career ==
In early 1988, Edinburgh-based Mike Peden and James Locke were looking to form a band to record some songs they had written, but had not yet found a suitable vocalist. Henry's name was passed on to them, and after hearing a tape of her voice played over the telephone, they arranged to meet her. Initially intending for Henry to record songs they had already written, the group soon evolved into a partnership where Henry also contributed to the songwriting. Naming themselves the Chimes, the group were signed to CBS Records after a representative from the label saw them perform live in Edinburgh.

The group's first single, "1-2-3", produced by Jazzie B and Nellee Hooper, was released in August 1989 and peaked at No. 60 in the UK. Their version of "I Still Haven't Found What I'm Looking For" found the group greater success, reaching No. 6 in the UK the following year. The Chimes' self-titled debut album was released in 1990, and reached the top 20 in the UK, Australia, Austria, and New Zealand. With subsequent singles faring less well on the charts, the band split up in 1991.

Henry then embarked on a solo career, with her first solo single, "Too Many People", reaching No. 38 in the UK in September 1993. Her next single, a cover version of Bad Company's "Feel Like Making Love", was a top 20 hit in the UK, Australia, and New Zealand. Henry's debut album, Pauline, was released in 1993, and reached the top 50 in the UK and Australia. A second solo album, Do Over, consisting of cover versions of others artists' songs, followed in 1996.

Henry then took a hiatus from her recording career, and obtained a Bachelor of Laws degree and a master's degree in Intellectual Property Law.

In 2016, Henry recorded a new version of the Chimes' song "Heaven" for the expanded re-issue of the Chimes' only album.

== Discography ==
=== Albums ===
==== Studio albums ====
Year	Album	Peak chart positions	
Year	Album	UK	AUS
1993	Pauline	45	37
1996	Do Over	—	173
"—" denotes releases that did not chart or were not released in that country.

==== Compilations ====
- 1998: Heaven – The Very Best of Pauline Henry & the Chimes

=== Singles ===
Year	Single	Peak chart positions						Certifications	Album
Year	Single	UK	AUS	GER	IRE	NZ	US Dance	Certifications	Album
1993	"Too Many People"	38	—	—	—	32	—		Pauline
1993	"Feel Like Making Love"	12	13	85	21	17	5	AUS: Gold	Pauline
1994	"Can't Take Your Love"	30	—	—	—	—	—		Pauline
1994	"Watch the Miracle Start"	54	213	—	—	—	—		Pauline
1994	"Too Many People" (Australian re-release)	—	76	—	—	—	—		Pauline
1995	"Sugar Free"	57	—	—	—	—	—		Do Over
1995	"Love Hangover"	37	—	—	—	—	—		Do Over
1996	"Never Knew Love Like This" (featuring Wayne Marshall)	40	—	—	—	—	—		Do Over
1996	"Happy"	46	—	—	—	—	—		Do Over
1998	"If I Can't Have You"	98	—	—	—	—	—		Non-album singles
2001	"I'm in Heaven" (Madd Forest featuring Pauline Henry) (white label only)	—	—	—	—	—	—		Non-album singles
2014	"Sunshine (Happiness)"	—	—	—	—	—	—		Non-album singles
2015	"I Got the Feeling Right"	—	—	—	—	—	—		Non-album singles
2017	"Heaven (The DJ Spen & Reelsoul Remixes)"	—	—	—	—	—	—		The Chimes 2016 re-issue
"—" denotes releases that did not chart or were not released in that country.
