= I Still Haven't Found What I'm Looking For =

1987 single by U2

- 7-inch vinyl variant of the standard artwork

Single by U2

from the album The Joshua Tree
- B-side: "Spanish Eyes"; "Deep in the Heart"
- Released: 25 May 1987
- Recorded: 1986
- Studio: Danesmoate House (Dublin)
- Genre: Rock; gospel
- Length: 4:37
- Label: Island
- Composer: U2
- Lyricist: Bono
- Producers: Daniel Lanois; Brian Eno

U2 singles chronology
"With or Without You" (1987)	"I Still Haven't Found What I'm Looking For" (1987)	"Where the Streets Have No Name" (1987)

Music video
- "I Still Haven't Found What I'm Looking For" on YouTube

"I Still Haven't Found What I'm Looking For" is a song by Irish rock band U2. It is the second track from their 1987 album The Joshua Tree and was released as the album's second single in May 1987. The song was a hit, becoming the band's second consecutive number-one single on the US Billboard Hot 100 while peaking at number six on the UK Singles Chart.

The song originated from a demo the band recorded on which drummer Larry Mullen Jr. played a unique rhythm pattern. Like much of The Joshua Tree, the song was inspired by the group's interest in American music. "I Still Haven't Found What I'm Looking For" exhibits influences from gospel music and its lyrics describe spiritual yearning. Lead singer Bono's vocals are in high register and guitarist the Edge plays a chiming arpeggio. Adding to the gospel qualities of the song are choir-like backing vocals provided by the Edge and producers Brian Eno and Daniel Lanois.

"I Still Haven't Found What I'm Looking For" was critically acclaimed and received two nominations at the 30th Annual Grammy Awards in 1988, for Record of the Year and Song of the Year. It has subsequently become one of the group's most well-known songs and has been performed on many of their concert tours. The track has appeared on several of their compilations and concert films. Many critics and publications have ranked "I Still Haven't Found What I'm Looking For" among the greatest tracks in music history, including Rolling Stone which ranked the song at number 93 of its 2010 list of "The 500 Greatest Songs of All Time".

== Writing and recording ==
"I Still Haven't Found What I'm Looking For" originated from a demo variously titled "The Weather Girls" and "Under the Weather" that the band recorded during a jam session. Bassist Adam Clayton called the demo's melody "a bit of a one-note groove", while an unconvinced The Edge, the band's guitarist, compared it to "'Eye of the Tiger' played by a reggae band". However, the band liked the drum part played by drummer Larry Mullen Jr. Co-producer Daniel Lanois said, "It was a very original beat from Larry. We always look for those beats that would qualify as a signature for the song. And that certainly was one of those. It had this tom-tom thing that he does and nobody ever understands. And we just didn't want to let go of that beat, it was so unique." Lanois encouraged Mullen to continue pursuing and developing the weird drum pattern. Mullen said the beat became even more unusual, and although Lanois eventually mixed most of the pattern out to just keep the basics, the rhythm became the root of "I Still Haven't Found What I'm Looking For".

"I've always liked gospel music and I encouraged Bono to take it to that place ... It was a very non-U2 thing to do at the time, to go up the street of gospel. I think it opened a door for them, to experiment with that territory ... [Bono]'s singing at the top of his range and there is something very compelling about somebody pushing themselves. It's like hearing Aretha Franklin almost. It jumps on you and you can't help but feel the feeling."

— Daniel Lanois

The group worked on the track at the studio they had set up at Danesmoate House in Dublin. Lanois compared the creation of the song to constructing a building, retaining the drums from the original demo of "The Weather Girls", then adding additional layers piece by piece, before finally "putting in furniture". Lead singer Bono was interested in the theme of spiritual doubt, which was fostered by Eno's love for gospel music, and by Bono's listening to songs by The Swan Silvertones, The Staple Singers, and Blind Willie Johnson. After the Edge wrote a chord sequence and played it on acoustic guitar "with a lot of power in the strumming", the group attempted to compose a suitable vocal melody, trying out a variety of ideas. During a jam session, Bono began singing a "classic soul" melody, and it was this addition that made the Edge hear the song's potential. At that point, he remembered a phrase he had written in a notebook that morning as a possible song title, "I still haven't found what I'm looking for". He suggests it was influenced by a line from the Bob Dylan song "Idiot Wind": "You'll find out when you reach the top you're on the bottom". He wrote the phrase on a piece of paper and handed it to Bono while he was singing. The Edge called the phrase's fit with the song "like hand in glove". From that point on, the song was the first piece played to visitors during the recording sessions.

"I Still Haven't Found What I'm Looking For"
Gospel music influenced the song. Bono's vocals are in a higher register, and he sings of spiritual doubt.

As recording continued, a number of guitar overdubs were added, including an auto-pan effect and a chiming arpeggio to modernise the old-style "gospel song". While the Edge was improvising guitar parts one day, Bono heard a "chrome bells" guitar hook that he liked. It was added as a counter-melody to the song's "muddy shoes" guitar part, and it is this hook that the Edge plays during live performances of the song. Bono sang in the upper register of his range to add to the feeling of spiritual yearning; in the verses he hits a B♭ note, and an A♭ in the chorus. Background vocals were provided by the Edge, Lanois, and co-producer Brian Eno, their voices being multi-tracked. Lanois suggests that his and Eno's involvement in the track's creation helped their vocals. He stated, "You're not going to get that sound of, 'Oh they brought in some soul singers' if you know what I mean. Our hearts and souls are already there. If we sing it'll sound more real." Lanois also played a percussive guitar part, which is heard in the introduction. The song's writing was completed relatively early during the band's time at Danesmoate House. The mix took longer to complete, though, with most of the production team contributing. The final mix was completed by Lanois and the Edge in a home studio set up at Melbeach, a house purchased by the Edge. They mixed it on top of a previous Steve Lillywhite mix, which gave the song a phasing sound. The final version of the song is composed in the key of D♭ major.

Lanois says he is very attached to "I Still Haven't Found What I'm Looking For" and has, on occasion, joined U2 on stage to perform it. The original "Weather Girls" demo, re-titled "Desert of Our Love", was included with the 2007 remastered version of The Joshua Tree on a bonus disc of outtakes and B-sides.

== Release ==
Initially, "Red Hill Mining Town" was planned for release as the second single. However, Bono was unable to sing the song during pre-tour rehearsals and the band were reportedly unhappy with the video shot by Neil Jordan, so "I Still Haven't Found What I'm Looking For" became a late choice for the second single. The single was released in May 1987. On the US Billboard Hot 100, the song debuted at number 51 on 13 June 1987. After nearly 2 months on the chart, the song reached number one on 8 August 1987, becoming the band's second consecutive number-one hit in the United States. The song spent two weeks in the top spot, and remained on the chart for 17 weeks. On other Billboard charts, the song peaked at number 16 on the Adult Contemporary chart, and number two on the Album Rock Tracks chart. The song also topped the Irish Singles Chart, while peaking at number six on the Canadian RPM Top 100 and the UK Singles Chart. In New Zealand, the song peaked at number two on the RIANZ Top 40 Singles Chart, while reaching number six on the Dutch Top 40 and number 11 on the Swedish Singles Chart.

=== Music video ===
The accompanying music video for the song was filmed on Fremont Street in Las Vegas on 12 April 1987 following their Joshua Tree Tour concert in that city. It features the band members wandering around while the Edge plays an acoustic guitar. The music video was later re-released on The U218 Videos compilation DVD. Pat Christenson, president of Las Vegas's official event organization, credits the group's video with improving the city's image among musicians. "The whole perception of Vegas changed with that video," Christenson said, adding, "Now all the big names come here, some of them five, six times a year."

=== B-sides ===
"Spanish Eyes" was created early during The Joshua Tree sessions. It began as a recording made in Adam Clayton's house of Clayton, the Edge, and Larry Mullen Jr. playing around with several different elements. The piece evolved substantially over the course of an afternoon, but the cassette and its recording was subsequently lost and forgotten. The Edge found the cassette towards the end of the album sessions and played it to the rest of the group. The band realised that it was a good track, but did not have enough time to complete it prior to The Joshua Tree's release.

"Deep in the Heart" stemmed from a three-chord piano piece Bono composed on the piano about the last time he had been in the family home on Cedarwood Road in Dublin, which his father had just sold. The memories of his time living there gave rise to many of the lyrical ideas on the song. The Edge and Adam Clayton reworked the piece extensively, with Bono later describing the finished result as "an almost jazz-like improvisation on three chords", also noting that "the rhythm section turned it into a very special piece of music." The song was recorded in a similar manner to the song "4th of July" from U2's 1984 album, The Unforgettable Fire; the Edge and Clayton were playing together in a room and unaware that they were being recorded on a 4-track cassette machine by the band's assistant, Marc Coleman.

== Reception ==
"I Still Haven't Found What I'm Looking For" received widespread critical acclaim. Hot Press journalist Bill Graham described the song as on the one-hand as a "smart job of pop handwork, pretty standard American radio rock-ballad fare" but that "the band's rhythms are far more supple and cultivated than your average bouffant HM band of that period". The Sunday Independent suggested that the song was proof the band could be commercially accessible without resorting to rock clichés. NME remarked that the song showed that the band cared about something, which made them "special". The Rocket noted that Bono's lyrics about needing personal spirituality resulted in a "unique marriage of American gospel and Gaelic soul" and that the "human perspective he brings to this sentiment rings far truer than the rantings of, say, the born-again Bob Dylan".

Cash Box said that "Typically drenched in Bono-esque pathos and Edge-guitar atmospherics, 'Still' has the power of spiritual conviction delivered from the perspective of the desert sojourn rather than the comfort of the Promised Land." Several publications, including The Bergen Record and The Boston Globe, called the track "hypnotic" and interpreted it as depicting the band on a spiritual quest. The song finished in 18th place on the "Best Singles" list from The Village Voice's 1987 Pazz & Jop critics' poll.

== Live performances ==
The song is U2's 9th most played live song, and has been played on every tour except for the eXPERIENCE+iNNOCENCE Tour in 2018. It was played at every date of The Joshua Tree and Lovetown Tours, typically early in the main set. It was played at most of the 1992 legs of the Zoo TV Tour, typically rounding out the main set or being played acoustically on the B-Stage mid set. For most of the 1993 Zooropa shows however, the song was dropped. It returned to be played at each of the PopMart Tour's 93 shows, usually being played midway through the set. On the Elevation Tour it initially was very rare, only appearing once over the first and second legs. However, it became a regular again on the 3rd leg, being played late in the main set replacing the song "Mysterious Ways", which was used in that spot on the previous two legs. It was played at the majority of both the Vertigo and U2 360° Tours, typically early-to-mid main set. It was used as the closing song at just under half of the shows on the Innocence + Experience Tour, rotating with "One" and "40".

Island Records commissioned New York choir director, Dennis Bell, to record a gospel version of the song, and Island intended to release it after U2's single. However, Island boss Chris Blackwell vetoed the plan. Bell subsequently formed his own label. While in Glasgow in late July 1987 during the Joshua Tree Tour, Rob Partridge of Island Records played the demo that Bell and his choir, the New Voices of Freedom, had made. In late September, U2 rehearsed with Bell's choir in Greater Calvary Baptist Church in Harlem for a performance together in a few days at U2's Madison Square Garden concert. The Edge's guitar was the only instrument that U2 brought to the church although Mullen borrowed a conga drum. The rehearsal was done with the church's audio system and footage was used in the Rattle and Hum motion picture. Several performances were made with a piano player; however, the version used in the film includes only Bono, the Edge, Mullen, and the choir. Audio from the Madison Square Garden performance appears on the accompanying album.

A live performance of the song appears in the concert films PopMart: Live from Mexico City, Vertigo 05: Live from Milan, Live from Paris and the most recent U2 360° at the Rose Bowl. The versions on the Mexico City and Milan concert films consist of just Bono's voice and the Edge's guitar until after the first chorus where the drum and bass parts kick in. Digital live versions were released through iTunes on the Love: Live from the Point Depot and U2.COMmunication albums.

== Legacy ==
"I Still Haven't Found What I'm Looking For" has been acclaimed by many critics and publications as one of the greatest songs of all time. In 2001, the song was ranked at number 120 on the RIAA's list of 365 "Songs of the Century" – a project intended to "promote a better understanding of America's musical and cultural heritage" – despite the group's Irish origins. In 2003, a special edition issue of Q, titled "1001 Best Songs Ever", placed "I Still Haven't Found What I'm Looking For" at number 148 on its list of the greatest songs. In 2005, Blender ranked the song at number 443 on its list of "The 500 Greatest Songs Since You Were Born". In 2004, Rolling Stone ranked the song 93rd on its list of "The 500 Greatest Songs of All Time"; the song remained in that position on the magazine's 2010 version of the list, but was re-ranked to 321st on the 2021 version. In 2022, New York Magazine's Vulture.com ranked the song at number four in its list of all 234 U2 songs.

Los Angeles Times critic Robert Hilburn called it U2's "Let It Be", in reference to the Beatles song. The staff of the Rock and Roll Hall of Fame selected "I Still Haven't Found What I'm Looking For" as one of 500 Songs that Shaped Rock and Roll.

The song was covered by Scottish band the Chimes in 1990 and was featured on their self-titled debut album. The rendition peaked at number six in both the United Kingdom and New Zealand charts. It also peaked into number twelve in the Netherlands chart.

== Track listing ==
All tracks are written by U2.

No.	Title	Producer	Length
1.	"I Still Haven't Found What I'm Looking For"	Brian Eno, Daniel Lanois	4:38
2.	"Spanish Eyes"	U2	3:16
3.	"Deep in the Heart"	U2	4:31
Total length:			12:25

== Personnel ==
U2

- Bono – lead vocals
- The Edge – guitars, backing vocals
- Adam Clayton – bass guitar
- Larry Mullen Jr. – drums

Additional personnel

- Brian Eno – production, mixing, backing vocals
- Daniel Lanois – production, mixing, backing vocals, additional guitar, tambourine
- Flood – recording
- Dave Meegan – additional engineering
- Pat McCarthy – recording assistance

== Charts ==
=== Weekly charts ===
Weekly chart performance for "I Still Haven't Found What I'm Looking For"
Chart (1987–1988)	Peak position
Australia (Kent Music Report)	17
Austria (Ö3 Austria Top 40)	10
Belgium (Ultratop 50 Flanders)	20
Canada Top Singles (RPM)	6
Finland (Suomen virallinen lista)	6
France (SNEP)	37
Ireland (IRMA)	1
Italy (Musica e Dischi)	17
Italy Airplay (Music & Media)	13
Netherlands (Dutch Top 40)	6
Netherlands (Single Top 100)	6
New Zealand (Recorded Music NZ)	2
South Africa (Springbok Radio)	29
Sweden (Sverigetopplistan)	11
Switzerland (Schweizer Hitparade)	18
UK Singles (Official Charts)	6
US Billboard Hot 100	1
US Adult Contemporary (Billboard)	16
US Album Rock Tracks (Billboard)	2
US Cash Box Top 100	1
West Germany (GfK)	13

Weekly chart performance for "I Still Haven't Found What I'm Looking For" upon its usage in Sing 2
Chart (2022)	Peak position
US Hot Rock & Alternative Songs (Billboard)	22

=== Year-end charts ===
1987 year-end chart performance for "I Still Haven't Found What I'm Looking For"
Chart (1987)	Position
Canada Top Singles (RPM)	50
European Hot 100 Singles (Music & Media)	75
Netherlands (Dutch Top 40)	53
Netherlands (Single Top 100)	45
New Zealand (Recorded Music NZ)	7
UK Singles (OCC)	92
US Billboard Hot 100	23
US Cash Box Pop Singles	16

== Certifications ==
Certifications and sales for "I Still Haven't Found What I'm Looking For"
Region	Certification	Certified units/sales
Austria (IFPI Austria)	Gold	50,000^{*}
Brazil (Pro-Música Brasil)	Gold	30,000^{‡}
Canada (Music Canada)	Gold	50,000^{^}
Denmark (IFPI Danmark)	Platinum	90,000^{‡}
Germany (BVMI)	Gold	250,000^{‡}
Italy (FIMI) sales since 2009	Platinum	70,000^{‡}
Spain (Promusicae)	Platinum	60,000^{‡}
United Kingdom (BPI)	Platinum	600,000^{‡}
^{*} Sales figures based on certification alone.^{^} Shipments figures based on certification alone.^{‡} Sales+streaming figures based on certification alone.

== The Chimes version ==
"I Still Haven't Found What I'm Looking For"

Single by the Chimes

from the album The Chimes
- Released: May 1990
- Genre: R&B
- Length: 4:02
- Label: CBS
- Composer: U2
- Lyricist: Bono
- Producer: The Chimes

The Chimes singles chronology
"Heaven" (1989)	"I Still Haven't Found What I'm Looking For" (1990)	"True Love" (1990)

Music video
- "I Still Haven't Found What I'm Looking For" on YouTube

Scottish band the Chimes released a cover version of "I Still Haven't Found What I'm Looking For" in May 1990 by CBS Records. It was released as the third single from their only album, The Chimes (1990), and reached No. 2 in Norway and No. 6 in the United Kingdom, Ireland, and New Zealand.

=== Critical reception ===
Stewart Mason from AllMusic described the song as "gospel-tinged", noting that it "finds new levels of power in that overplayed song, and its inclusion makes perfect thematic and musical sense instead of being the desperate plea for chart attention it might have been in less capable hands." Bill Coleman from Billboard magazine named it the "perfect cover version", and a "tasteful, contemporary R&B treatment of a pop favorite [that] may be this U.K. threesome's key to a stateside breakthrough. Multiformat exposure is well-deserved." Dave Haynes from Calgary Herald complimented it as a "sultry reworking" and the "most interesting cut" of the album. Ernest Hardy from Cashbox viewed it as "a moving cover", that "should be their entry into the big time."

Chris Roberts from Melody Maker wrote, "I still don't realise it's that horrible U2 song because I'm enjoying it immensely. Somehow the Chimes, gradually evolving into the most consistent of Brit soul bands, have transformed the sub-Dylan turkey into a smoochy summery thing that claws into your spinal cord and hangs there like a first kiss, purring." David Giles from Music Week stated, "This is a luxurious cover which wraps a huge voice in a Soul II Soul style backing to heart-stirring effect." Miranda Sawyer from Smash Hits noted Pauline Henry's "remarkable voice", describing the song as "classy" and "a lovely, lazy Soul II Soul-style groover." She added that it's "the sort of tune that makes you think of sappy summer things. Warm sea, sandy shores, coasting about on your bike down leafy lanes."

=== Track listing ===
7-inch single, UK (1990)
No.	Title	Length
1.	"I Still Haven't Found What I'm Looking For"	4:01
2.	"No Need to Pretend"	3:19

12-inch single, UK (1990)
No.	Title	Length
1.	"I Still Haven't Found What I'm Looking For" (Boom Mix)	5:33
2.	"I Still Haven't Found What I'm Looking For" (Manasseh Mix)	5:27
3.	"I Still Haven't Found What I'm Looking For" (Boom Dub Mix)	5:18

CD single, UK (1990)
No.	Title	Length
1.	"I Still Haven't Found What I'm Looking For"	4:01
2.	"I Still Haven't Found What I'm Looking For" (Manasseh Mix)	5:27
3.	"I Still Haven't Found What I'm Looking For" (Street Mix)	6:17
4.	"No Need to Pretend"	3:19

=== Charts ===
==== Weekly charts ====
Weekly chart performance for the Chimes' cover
Chart (1990)	Peak position
Australia (ARIA)	26
Austria (Ö3 Austria Top 40)	17
Belgium (Ultratop 50 Flanders)	21
Europe (Eurochart Hot 100)	17
Finland (Suomen virallinen lista)	21
Ireland (IRMA)	6
Israel (Israeli Singles Chart)	12
Luxembourg (Radio Luxembourg)	1
Netherlands (Dutch Top 40)	11
Netherlands (Single Top 100)	12
New Zealand (Recorded Music NZ)	6
Norway (VG-lista)	2
UK Singles (Official Charts)	6
West Germany (GfK)	20

==== Year-end charts ====
1990 year-end chart performance for the Chimes' cover
Chart (1990)	Position
Netherlands (Dutch Top 40)	97

== Scarlett Johansson and Bono duet version ==
"I Still Haven't Found What I'm Looking For"

Song by Scarlett Johansson and Bono

from the album Sing 2: Original Motion Picture Soundtrack
- Released: 17 December 2021
- Genre: Soundtrack; pop
- Label: Republic
- Composer: U2
- Lyricist: Bono

In 2021, American actress Scarlett Johansson (under the role of Ash) and U2 frontman Bono (under the role of Clay Calloway) performed a duet of the song for the soundtrack of the American animated jukebox musical comedy film Sing 2. The film also features two other songs by U2, "Where the Streets Have No Name" (also from The Joshua Tree album) (performed by the cast, the same lineup also perform the Prince song "Let's Go Crazy" earlier in the film), "Stuck in a Moment You Can't Get Out Of" (performed by Johansson), and the original song "Your Song Saved My Life", which was released as the lead single from the soundtrack on 3 November 2021. The duet was released as the nineteenth and final track on the soundtrack album on 17 December 2021.

=== Charts ===
Chart performance for "I Still Haven't Found What I'm Looking For" (Scarlett Johansson and Bono duet version)
Chart (2022)	Peak position
US Hot Rock & Alternative Songs (Billboard)	48

== See also ==
- List of covers of U2 songs – I Still Haven't Found What I'm Looking For
