= Feel Like Makin' Love (Bad Company song) =

1975 power ballad

- Solid centre variant of the UK single

Single by Bad Company

from the album Straight Shooter
- B-side: "Wild Fire Woman"
- Released: June 1975 (US); August 1975 (UK)
- Recorded: September 1974
- Studio: Clearwell Castle, Gloucestershire, England
- Genre: Hard rock; soft rock
- Length: 5:12
- Label: Swan Song
- Songwriters: Paul Rodgers; Mick Ralphs
- Producer: Bad Company

Bad Company singles chronology
| "Good Lovin' Gone Bad" (1975) | "Feel Like Makin' Love" (1975) | "Run with the Pack" (1975) |

Audio
- "Feel Like Makin' Love" by Bad Company on YouTube

"Feel Like Makin' Love" is a song by English supergroup Bad Company. The power ballad originally appeared on their second LP, Straight Shooter (1975), and was released as a single in June of the same year by Swan Song Records. It was named the 78th best hard rock song of all time by VH1.

The song, along with other Bad Company music, was featured in the 2001 film Scotland, PA.

== Origin ==
Paul Rodgers started to come up with the lyrics at a camp in California while touring the US with Free. He was 19 years old. After several years, Rodgers played it to Bad Company guitarist Mick Ralphs who "threw in that big chord in the chorus - the muted 'duh-duh' that marks the shift from country ballad to chest-beating rocker".

== Reception ==
Cash Box said that the "strong two-pronged attack from Ralphs' guitar and Rodgers' vocals make the track an excellent choice to follow 'Good Lovin''." Record World said that the song was "a Pentangle-influenced British folk-rock original" in which "guitars alternate between acoustical peace and electronic pow for a most unique effect."

Ultimate Classic Rock critic Matt Wardlaw rated it as Bad Company's second best song, saying that "a muscular guitar riff from Mick Ralphs then adds extra emphasis to the bluesy passion of Rodgers' vocals." Classic Rock History critic Janey Roberts also rated it as Bad Company's second best song. Classic Rock critic Malcolm Dome rated it as Bad Company's third best song, praising the "unmistakable guitar opening", "the strolling introduction, opening out into a more strident chorus" and "Ralphs' stunning guitar pattern."

== Charts ==
=== Weekly charts ===
| Chart (1975) | Peak position |
|---|---|
| Canada Top Singles (RPM) | 5 |
| New Zealand (Recorded Music NZ) | 2 |
| UK Singles (OCC) | 20 |
| US Billboard Hot 100 | 10 |

=== Year-end charts ===
| Chart (1975) | Rank |
|---|---|
| US Billboard Hot 100 | 68 |

== Personnel ==
- Paul Rodgers – lead and backing vocals, rhythm guitar
- Mick Ralphs – lead guitar
- Boz Burrell – bass guitar
- Simon Kirke – drums

== Pauline Henry version ==
"Feel Like Making Love"

Single by Pauline Henry

from the album Pauline
- Released: 1993
- Recorded: 1992
- Genre: Dance; pop hip hop
- Length: 3:35 (radio edit)
- Label: Sony Soho Square
- Songwriters: Paul Rodgers; Mick Ralphs
- Producers: Tim Lever; Mike Percy

Pauline Henry singles chronology
| "Too Many People" (1993) | "Feel Like Making Love" (1993) | "Can't Take Your Love" (1994) |

In 1993, the song was covered by British-Jamaican former The Chimes singer Pauline Henry, titled "Feel Like Making Love". The single was produced by Tim Lever and Mike Percy, and released in late 1993 by Sony Soho Square as the second single from her debut solo album, Pauline (1993). It reached No. 12 in the United Kingdom, No. 13 in Australia and Denmark, and No. 17 in New Zealand. On the Eurochart Hot 100, "Feel Like Making Love" peaked at No. 26. The accompanying music video was directed by German director Marcus Nispel, featuring Henry performing the song in a kitchen while playing with food from an open refrigator.

=== Critical reception ===
Larry Flick from Billboard magazine wrote, "On this smashing solo debut, she wraps her well-honed chords around a shiny Bad Company classic rock gem. The result is a guitar-driven pop/hip hop shuffler drenched in the kind of sweet diva drama that top 40 and R&B radio love to actively pump." Caroline Sullivan from The Guardian named it a "guitar-blasting" hit. In his weekly UK chart commentary, James Masterton said, "A much better showing from the former Chimes vocalist after her debut single 'Too Many People' disappointed many by only peaking at No.38." Music & Media wrote, "Attention to all retro maniacs out there. On the borders between rock and dance Henry covers this '70s rocker by Bad Company." The magazine added, "She has the voice, and the material; if she has got "hot legs" too, she could be the next Tina Turner."

Alan Jones from Music Week gave the song a score of four out of five, calling it "a surprisingly faithful rock arrangement on the regular mix, [with] Ms Henry's tones making an ideal substitute for those of the equally soulful Paul Rodgers. A plethora of additional mixes take the track to the dancefloor, guaranteeing a hit." Wendi Cermak from The Network Forty described it as a "soulful rendition", noting that "just as crunchy as the original, this funky diva adds a '90s attitudinal delivery." Adam Higginbotham from Select felt the singer "do[es] some Jennifer Rush-style rockin'" on the song. Mark Sutherland from Smash Hits complimented it as "quite good". David Toop from The Times felt there is "a strong 1970s feel with a contemporary edge" on "Feel Like Making Love".

=== Track listing ===
- CD single, Europe (1993)
1. "Feel Like Making Love" – 3:59
2. "Love Comes to Mind" (The Chimes featuring Pauline Henry) – 4:40
- CD single, UK (1993)
1. "Feel Like Making Love" – 3:59
2. "Feel Like Making Love" (D'Rhythm Mix) – 6:43
3. "Feel Like Making Love" (Extended Mix) – 6:04
4. "Love Comes to Mind" (Remix) – 4:06
- CD maxi, US (1993)
1. "Feel Like Making Love" (Radio Edit) – 3:35
2. "Feel Like Making Love" (Damien's Feel Like Makin' Radio Edit) – 2:54
3. "Feel Like Making Love" (Original Extended Version) – 6:04
4. "Feel Like Making Love" (Damien's Feel Like Makin' Club Mix) – 4:37
5. "Feel Like Making Love" (D'Rhythm Mix) – 6:42
6. "Feel Like Making Love" (D'Media Mix) – 5:41

=== Charts ===
==== Weekly charts ====
| Chart (1993–94) | Peak position |
|---|---|
| Australia (ARIA) | 13 |
| Denmark (IFPI) | 13 |
| Europe (Eurochart Hot 100) | 26 |
| Europe (European Dance Radio) | 25 |
| Europe (European Hit Radio) | 39 |
| Germany (Media Control Charts) | 85 |
| Ireland (IRMA) | 21 |
| New Zealand (RIANZ) | 17 |
| UK Singles (OCC) | 12 |
| UK Airplay (Music Week) | 3 |
| UK Dance (Music Week) | 4 |
| UK Club Chart (Music Week) | 9 |
| US Hot Dance Club Play (Billboard) | 5 |
| US Maxi-Singles Sales (Billboard) | 45 |

==== Year-end charts ====
| Chart (1994) | Position |
|---|---|
| Australia (ARIA) | 71 |

==== Certifications ====
| Region | Certification | Certified units/sales |
|---|---|---|
| Australia (ARIA) | Gold | 35,000^{^} |
^{^} Shipments figures based on certification alone.

== Other charted versions ==
A version by country music artist Philip Claypool peaked at no. 60 on the Hot Country Songs chart, making it the highest-charting out of four from his debut album A Circus Leaving Town (1995).

Kid Rock's version, appearing on his self-titled 2003 release, peaked at No. 33 on the Mainstream Rock Tracks chart.

Millie Jackson recorded "Feel Like Making Love" in 1976, reaching No. 71 on the R&B chart.

== Other alternative versions ==
Davey T Hamilton recorded an up-tempo cover of the song that was released in 2018.
