= Miracle Power =

2022 song by We the Kingdom

Single by We the Kingdom

from the album We the Kingdom
- Released: May 27, 2022
- Recorded: 2022
- Genre: Contemporary Christian music, contemporary worship
- Length: 4:37
- Label: Capitol CMG
- Songwriter(s): Ed Cash; Scott Cash; Franni Cash; Martin Cash; Andrew Bergthold
- Producer(s): We the Kingdom

We the Kingdom singles chronology
"Silent Night (Heavenly Peace)" (2021)	"Miracle Power" (2022)	"Jesus Does" (2023)

Music video
- "Miracle Power" (Live) on YouTube

"Miracle Power" is a song by We the Kingdom that was released as the lead single from their eponymously titled second studio album on May 27, 2022. The song was written by Ed Cash, Scott Cash, Franni Cash, Martin Cash, and Andrew Bergthold.

"Miracle Power" peaked at No. 15 on the US Hot Christian Songs chart.

== Background ==
On May 27, 2022, We the Kingdom released "Miracle Power" as a single, accompanied with its live music video. The band also announced that "Miracle Power" is the lead single to their forthcoming second studio album. "Miracle Power" was released to Christian radio stations in the United States on June 24, 2022.

== Composition ==
"Miracle Power" is composed in the key of F with a tempo of 72 beats per minute and a musical time signature of 4/4.

== Commercial performance ==
"Miracle Power" debuted at No. 32 on the US Hot Christian Songs chart dated June 11, 2022, concurrently charting at No. 5 on the Christian Digital Song Sales chart.

== Music video ==
The live music video of "Miracle Power" was by We the Kingdom released on May 27, 2022, through YouTube.

== Charts ==
=== Weekly charts ===
Weekly chart performance for "Miracle Power"
Chart (2022–2023)	Peak position
US Hot Christian Songs (Billboard)	15
US Christian Airplay (Billboard)	13
US Christian AC (Billboard)	13

=== Year-end charts ===
Year-end chart performance for "Miracle Power"
Chart (2022)	Position
US Christian Songs (Billboard)	58
US Christian Airplay (Billboard)	50
US Christian AC (Billboard)	50
Chart (2023)	Position
US Christian Songs (Billboard)	66

== Release history ==
Region	Date	Format	Label	Ref.
Various	May 27, 2022	Digital download; streaming	Capitol Christian Music Group	
United States	June 24, 2022	Christian radio	Capitol Christian Music Group	
