= Don't Tread on Me (We the Kingdom song) =

2020 song by We the Kingdom

Single by We the Kingdom

from the album Holy Water
- Released: April 24, 2020
- Recorded: 2019–2020
- Genre: Contemporary Christian music
- Length: 3:59
- Label: Capitol CMG
- Songwriter(s): Ed Cash; Scott Cash; Franni Cash; Martin Cash; Andrew Bergthold
- Producer(s): We the Kingdom

We the Kingdom singles chronology
"Christmas Day" (2019)	"Don't Tread on Me" (2020)	"God So Loved" (2020)

Music videos
- "Don't Tread on Me" (Live) on YouTube
- "Don't Tread on Me" (Lyrics) on YouTube
- "Don't Tread on Me" (Church Sessions) on YouTube
- "Don't Tread on Me" (Storybrook Sessions) on YouTube

"Don't Tread on Me" is a song by We the Kingdom that was released as the third single from their debut studio album, Holy Water (2020), on April 24, 2020. The song was written by Ed Cash, Scott Cash, Franni Cash, Martin Cash, and Andrew Bergthold.

"Don't Tread On Me" peaked at No. 40 on the US Hot Christian Songs chart.

== Background ==
"Don't Tread on Me" was released by We the Kingdom as the third single from their debut studio album, Holy Water (2020), along with its accompanying lyric video. Ed Cash shared the message of the song, saying:

It's one of those songs, that for us, is just a powerful thing to proclaim. We've been given authority over the kingdom of darkness by Jesus. When we come together and we proclaim that, it is really powerful.

== Composition ==
"Don't Tread On Me" is composed in the key of E minor with a tempo of 70 beats per minute and a musical time signature of 4/4. The singers' vocal range spans from D_{4} to C_{5}.

== Commercial performance ==
"Don't Tread On Me" made its debut at No. 40 on the US Hot Christian Songs chart dated August 22, 2020, following its commercial release.

== Music videos ==
We the Kingdom released the lyric video of "Don't Tread On Me" on April 24, 2020. The live music video of the song, recorded at Young Life Sharptop Cove in Jasper, Georgia, was released on May 5, 2020, on YouTube. The Church Sessions video featuring an appearance by Maverick City Music was released on October 19, 2020. The Storybrooke Sessions video was released to YouTube on June 9, 2020.

== Charts ==
Weekly chart performance for "Don't Tread On Me"
Chart (2020)	Peak position
US Christian Songs (Billboard)	40

== Release history ==
Region	Date	Format	Label	Ref.
Various	April 24, 2020	Digital download; streaming	Capitol Christian Music Group	
