= Fontanel Mansion =

Log home in Nashville, Tennessee

The Fontanel Mansion is a large log home in Nashville, Tennessee, on 186 acres of property that also contains public walking trails, a bed and breakfast inn called The Inn, the Carl Black Chevy Woods Amphitheater, Adventureworks Ziplines, the Natchez Hills Winery, one of the two Prichard's Distillery locations, Stone House Gift Shoppe, and a café called Café Fontanella.

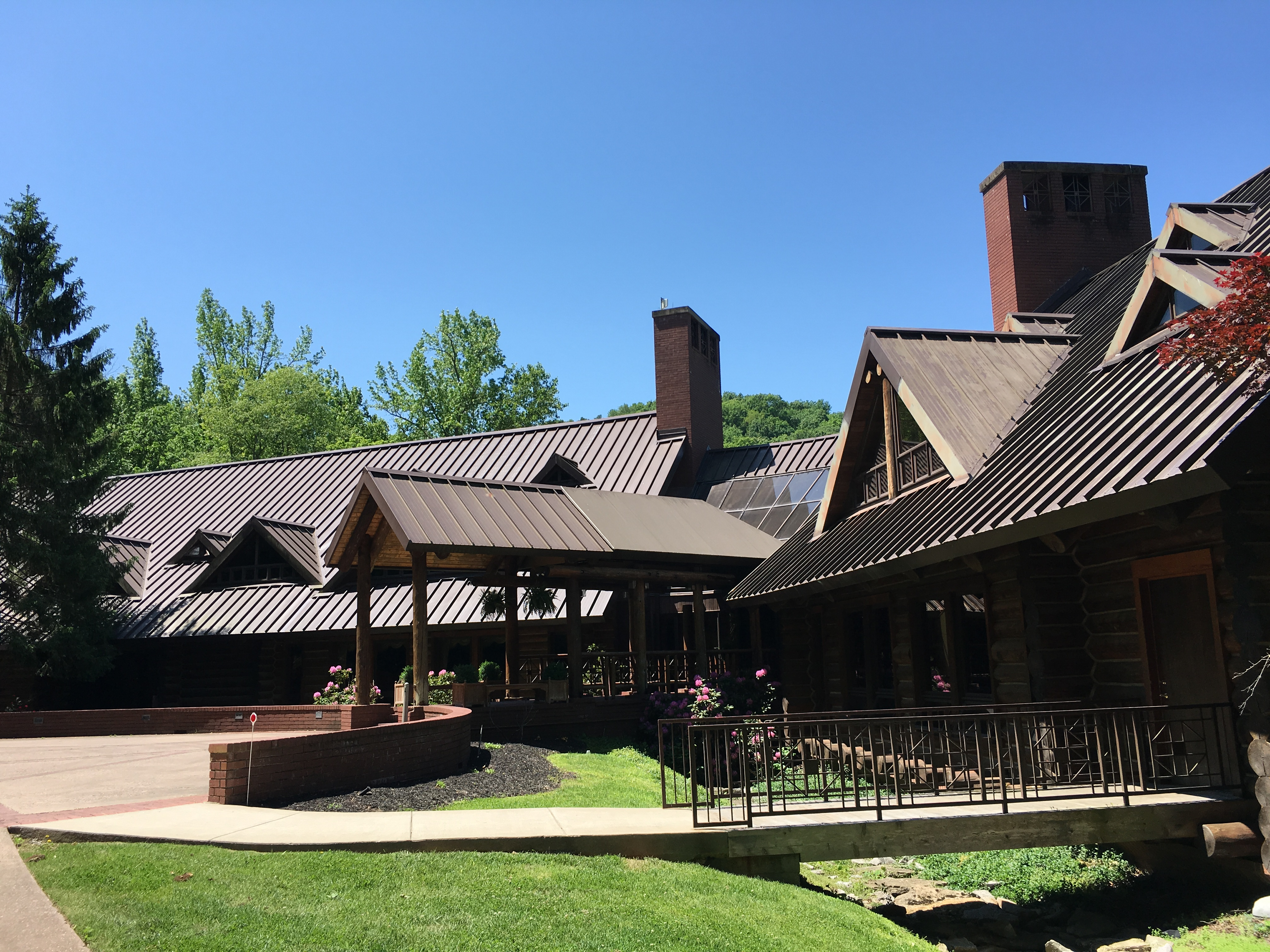
Barbara Mandrell's Fontanel Mansion

== History ==
The Fontanel Mansion was built in 1988 for Barbara Mandrell and her family. The name Fontanel, which is the soft spot on a baby's head, was picked by Barbara Mandrell because she wanted this to be the "soft spot" for her family and bring them all together. The Mandrell family lived in the house from 1988 to 2002. In 2002, the Fontanel Mansion property was bought by Dale Morris and Marc Oswald, two investors. They used it as a set to film television productions and video shoots. In June 2010, the owners made the Fontanel property into a tourist attraction.

The Fontanel Mansion is located in Whites Creek, Tennessee, and has 27,000 square feet of interior space. It stands three stories and contains more than 20 rooms, 13 baths, 5 fireplaces, 2 kitchens, an indoor pool atrium that converts to a dance floor and an indoor shooting range. The mansion is one of the largest log homes in the world. The walls are filled with memorabilia from the Mandrells' family collection, including items from Alabama, Kenny Chesney, Big & Rich, Gretchen Wilson, Buck Owens, and the Eagles. Currently, the hospitality director of the Fontanel property is Jamie Dudney, Barbara Mandrell's daughter.

The property now includes The Inn, Prichard's Distillery, Natchez Hills Winery, Adventureworks Ziplines, The Mansion, the Carl Black Chevy Woods Amphitheater, The Trails and Greenway, Stone House Shoppe, and Vintage Creek Boutique. Tours of the property take approximately two hours.

In 2013, the Fontanel Mansion offered the Barbara Mandrell Bus Tour as a paid attraction. The vehicle is a 1993 Hemphill Brothers Eagle coach that Mandrell used during her tours, and it was subsequently acquired by the Christian rock girl band BarlowGirl. In January 2020, BarlowGirl management relisted the bus for sale.

In 2016, Dale Morris became the sole owner of two-thirds of the property. He paid $9.87 million to buy out Marc Oswald.

In 2016, the property owner proposed a $25 million expansion of the site's bed and breakfast inn. The plan included adding 136 rooms, a banquet and meeting hall, a pool and spa, and retail space, and would have added an additional 31 acres to the complex. Some area residents objected to the expansion, saying it would ruin the rural historic character of the area, and the project was stalled.

The complex was purchased by Chicago-based BlueRoad Ventures for $14.5 million in February 2019.

On August 13, 2019, Fontanel management announced the property was closing "for the time being."

As of December 2019, "Adventure Works Ziplines and the greenway trails are the only areas that are still open." However, BlueRoad has a vision to bring Fontanel "back to life," which includes building "150 one-bedroom cabins, bungalows and 'yurts' throughout the property."

=== Cultural references ===
The mansion can be seen in the television series Gone Country, the film Country Strong, and other photo and video shoots especially in the country music genre.

== See also ==
- Live from the Woods at Fontanel
