= Child of Love =

2021 single by We the Kingdom

Single by We the Kingdom featuring Bear Rinehart

from the album Holy Water
- Released: January 29, 2021
- Recorded: 2020
- Genre: Contemporary Christian music
- Length: 4:11
- Label: Capitol CMG
- Songwriter(s): Ed Cash; Scott Cash; Franni Cash; Martin Cash; Andrew Bergthold
- Producer(s): We the Kingdom

We the Kingdom singles chronology
"Light of the World (Sing Hallelujah)" (2020)	"Child of Love" (2021)

Music video
- "Child of Love" on YouTube

"Child of Love" is a song by We the Kingdom that was the fifth single released from their first studio album, Holy Water (2020), on January 29, 2021. It was written by Ed Cash, Scott Cash, Franni Cash, Martin Cash and Andrew Bergthold.

"Child of Love" peaked at No. 5 on the US Hot Christian Songs chart.

== Background ==
We the Kingdom initially released the original version of "Child of Love" on July 3, 2020, as a promotional single from the album, Holy Water (2020). On January 8, 2021, the band released a new version of the song featuring Maverick City Music as part of the deluxe edition of Holy Water.

On January 29, 2021, We the Kingdom released the new version of "Child of Love" featuring Bear Rinehart as a single. We the Kingdom commented on the collaboration with Rinehart, saying, "Bear brought something powerful to this song and it is out of control."

== Composition ==
"Child of Love" is composed in the key of G with a tempo of 100 beats per minute and a musical time signature of 4/4. The singers' vocal range spans from D_{4} to G_{5}.

== Critical reception ==
Jonathan Andre of 365 Days of Inspiring Media gave a positive review of the song, writing, "Bear Rinehart brings another depth and uniqueness to the song, as we see how a little tweak here and there, can elevate a track so high that I reckon this new version, will go farther than the original."

== Commercial performance ==
"Child of Love" entered the US Hot Christian Songs chart at No. 35 in the chart dated February 20, 2021, following its commercial release.

== Music videos ==
The official audio video of the song featuring Bear Rinehart was published on We the Kingdom's YouTube channel on January 29, 2021. The official music video of "Child of Love" featuring Bear Rinehart was released on April 9, 2021.

== Charts ==
=== Weekly charts ===
Weekly chart performance for "Child of Love"
Chart (2021)	Peak position
US Hot Christian Songs (Billboard)	5
US Christian Airplay (Billboard)	3
US Christian AC (Billboard)	2

=== Year-end charts ===
Year-end chart performance for "Child of Love"
Chart (2021)	Position
US Christian Songs (Billboard)	22
US Christian Airplay (Billboard)	13
US Christian AC (Billboard)	8

== Release history ==
Region	Date	Version	Format	Label	Ref.
Various	July 3, 2020	Original	Digital download (promotional release); streaming (promotional release)	Capitol Christian Music Group	
Various	January 29, 2021	Single (featuring Bear Rinehart)	Digital download; streaming	Capitol Christian Music Group	
