= Heaven (The Chimes song) =

1989 single by the Chimes

Single by the Chimes

from the album The Chimes
- Released: 20 November 1989
- Genre: House
- Length: 3:51
- Label: CBS
- Songwriters: Pauline Henry; Mike Peden; James Locke
- Producer: The Chimes

The Chimes singles chronology
"1-2-3" (1989)	"Heaven" (1989)	"I Still Haven't Found What I'm Looking For" (1990)

Music video
- "Heaven" on YouTube

"Heaven" is a song by Scottish band the Chimes, released on 20 November 1989 by CBS Records International as the second single from their only album, The Chimes (1990). It was both written and produced by the band, reaching number one on the US Billboard Dance Club Play chart for a week and number 54 on the Billboard Hot Black Singles chart. "Heaven" also reached number 24 on the UK Singles Chart and number five in New Zealand.

== Critical reception ==
Bill Coleman of Billboard magazine complimented the song as "tasty" and "an even stronger club offering", than the band's debut single, "1-2-3". He felt that vocalist Pauline Henry's delivery "sends shivers and has been called by one colleague "the Candi Staton of the '90's"." Paul Lester from Melody Maker declared the song as "brilliant", adding that "Heaven" "should give the Chimes their second visit to Top of the Pops". Music & Media wrote that this self-produced and self written soul number has a house rhythm track and an "excellent" vocal performance. The reviewer added, "The record sparkles with gospel energy and the inclusion of an unexpectedly messy piano is great. Give it a play." When re-released in 1990, the magazine stated that "following up their massive "I Still Haven't Found...", this electryfing act brings us more house-pulsed dance. Soulful vocals and a rocking piano riff."

Nick Robinson from Music Week commented on the re-release, "This time the funky drum, subtle piano and wailing vocal track should make a sizeable dent in the pop chart, building on the success of "Still Haven't Found.." earlier this year." Helen Mead from NME complimented its "stomping smash and grab", declaring it as "a track that couldn't have been any more perfect for the club climate if they'd got Adamski in on keyboards." Daniele Davoli of Black Box reviewed "Heaven" for Number One, saying, "It's really nice. It seems to be like a true sound — when you close your eyes you see the song in the same way. It's not a refined song but it's full of feeling and that's the stuff I like. They're going to have a heavy success." Miranda Sawyer from Smash Hits noted Henry's "remarkable voice", declaring the track as "classy". Steven Daly from Spin concluded, "1990 won't yield many records better than the Chimes' go-for-broke paean to sexual congress "Heaven"..."

== Track listing ==
Mini CD single
No.	Title	Length
1.	"Heaven" (heavy club)	5:45
2.	"Heaven" (alternative 12-inch mix)	4:26
3.	"So Much in Love" (extended demo version)	4:32
Total length:		14:43

== Charts ==
=== Weekly charts ===
Chart (1990)	Peak position
Australia (ARIA)	62
Europe (Eurochart Hot 100)	67
Ireland (IRMA)	25
Netherlands (Dutch Top 40 Tipparade)	4
Netherlands (Single Top 100)	34
New Zealand (Recorded Music NZ)	5
UK Singles (OCC)	24
US 12-inch Singles Sales (Billboard)	15
US Dance Club Play (Billboard)	1
US Hot Black Singles (Billboard)	54

=== Year-end charts ===
Chart (1990)	Position
UK Club Chart (Record Mirror)	50
US Dance Club Play (Billboard)	34

== Release history ==
Region	Date	Format(s)	Label(s)	Ref.
United Kingdom	20 November 1989	7-inch vinyl; 12-inch vinyl; CD	CBS	
United Kingdom	4 December 1989	Cassette	CBS	
Australia	29 January 1990	7-inch vinyl; 12-inch vinyl; cassette	CBS	
Australia	2 April 1990	12-inch remix vinyl	CBS	
