= A Family Christmas (EP) =

2021 EP by We the Kingdom

EP by We the Kingdom
- Released: October 22, 2021
- Studio: Ed Cash's home studio, Franklin, Tennessee
- Genre: CCM; contemporary worship; Christmas music
- Length: 25:10
- Label: Capitol CMG; Sparrow
- Producer: We the Kingdom

We the Kingdom chronology
Live At Ocean Way Nashville (2021)	A Family Christmas (2021)	We the Kingdom (2022)

Singles from A Family Christmas
- 1. "Still Can’t Sleep On Christmas Eve" / "Silent Night (Heavenly Peace)" Released: November 3, 2021

A Family Christmas is the sixth extended play by American contemporary Christian music band We the Kingdom. The EP was released via Capitol Christian Music Group on October 22, 2021. The EP features guest appearances by Dante Bowe, Maverick City Music, and Chris Tomlin.

The EP was supported by the release of "Still Can’t Sleep On Christmas Eve" and "Silent Night (Heavenly Peace)" as singles.

The EP peaked at No. 44 on Billboard's Top Christian Albums chart in the United States. A Family Christmas received a GMA Dove Award nomination for Christmas / Special Event Album of the Year at the 2022 GMA Dove Awards.

== Background ==
On October 20, 2021, We the Kingdom announced that A Family Christmas EP was slated for release on October 22. The EP contains six tracks, including guest appearances from Dante Bowe and Maverick City Music on the song "Silent Night (Heavenly Place)" and Chris Tomlin on the song "Christmas Day". The EP was recorded in Ed Cash's home studio in Franklin, Tennessee.

== Release and promotion ==
=== Singles ===
"Still Can’t Sleep On Christmas Eve" and "Silent Night (Heavenly Peace)" were released to Christian radio in the United States as the lead singles from the EP.

== Reception ==
=== Critical response ===
Professional ratings
Review scores
Source	Rating
365 Days of Inspiring Media	4.5/5

Joshua Andre in his 365 Days of Inspiring Media review wrote a favourable review of the extended play, saying: "With nothing much more needing to be said about We The Kingdom and their debut Christmas project; this release is especially moving and inspiring," further adding that "every track has no discernible weaknesses in any aspect."

=== Accolades ===
Awards
Year	Organization	Award	Result	Ref
2022	GMA Dove Awards	Christmas / Special Event Album of the Year	Nominated	

== Track listing ==
All tracks were written by Ed Cash, Scott Cash, Franni Cash, Martin Cash, and Andrew Bergthold, except where stated.

A Family Christmas
No.	Title	Writer(s)	Length
1.	"Still Can't Sleep On Christmas Eve"	Ed Cash; Franni Cash	3:20
2.	"Glorious"		4:31
3.	"Silent Night (Heavenly Peace)" (with Dante Bowe and Maverick City Music)	Traditional	4:33
4.	"Light of the World (Sing Hallelujah)"		4:20
5.	"Light of the World (Sing Hallelujah)" (Live from Berry Hill)		4:03
6.	"Christmas Day" (with Chris Tomlin)		4:20
Total length:			25:11

== Charts ==
Chart performance for A Family Christmas
Chart (2022)	Peak position
US Christian Albums (Billboard)	44

== Release history ==
Release history and formats for A Family Christmas
Region	Date	Format(s)	Label(s)	Ref.
Various	October 22, 2021	CD; digital download; streaming	Capitol Christian Music Group	
