= Wayne Marshall (singer) =

British singer

- Birth name: Wayne Marshall
- Also known as: Marshayne
- Born: 19 June 1968 (age 56); Hackney, London
- Genres: R&B, reggae, soul, pop
- Occupation(s): Singer, songwriter, producer
- Instrument: Vocals
- Years active: 1993–present
- Labels: Soultown
- Website: Waynemarshall.co.uk

Wayne Marshall, also known as Marshayne, is a British singer. He scored several chart hits in the UK during the 1990s, including the slow jam "Ooh Aah (G Spot)" which was his biggest hit, reaching No. 29 in 1994. He featured on Pauline Henry's 1996 version of "Never Knew Love Like This" which was also a top 40 hit.

In 2017, Marshall was one of the acts who performed at the opening of new nightclub Unity in Dunstable.

== Discography ==
=== Albums ===
- Ninety Degrees & Rising (1994), Soultown
- Censored! (1995), Soultown
- Double-X-Posure (2 CD combination of both albums including extra tracks)

=== Singles ===
- "Miss Goodie Goody" (1993), United Soul
- "'Ooh Aah' (G-Spot)" (1994), Soultown - UK #29
- Menage a Trois (The EP) (1994), Soultown
- "Spirit" (1995), Soultown - UK #58
- "A Taste of 96" - "Sex in the Morn"/"Everything" (1995), Soultown
- "Never Knew Love Like This" (Pauline Henry featuring Wayne Marshall) (1996), Sony Soho Square - UK #40
- "G Spot" (1996), Inter Action/MBA Records - UK #50
- "Sensual Advance" (2018), Cougar Records
- "I Kneel for You" (as Marshayne) (2021), LOC Entertainment
