= We the Kingdom =

American contemporary Christian music band

- Origin: Nashville, Tennessee, U.S.
- Genres: CCM, Worship
- Years active: 2018–present
- Label: Capitol Christian Music Group
- Members: Andrew Bergthold; Ed Cash; Martin Cash; Scott Cash
- Past members: Franni Cash
- Website: Official website

We the Kingdom is an American contemporary Christian music band signed to the Capitol Christian Music Group. The band consists of multiple generations of relatives: Andrew Bergthold, Ed Cash, Martin Cash, and Scott Cash. The band's name comes after the idea that "the kingdom of God is here among us".

The band released its first singles, "Dancing on the Waves" and the breakout hit single "Holy Water", followed by their debut EP, Live at the Wheelhouse, in 2019. This garnered the band four nominations at the 51st GMA Dove Awards, ultimately winning the Dove Award for New Artist of the Year. In 2020, the band released their debut album, Holy Water which contained the previously released singles "Dancing on the Waves" and "Holy Water" as well as "Don't Tread on Me", "God So Loved" and "Child of Love". The band earned two Grammy Award nominations at the 63rd Annual Grammy Awards, with Holy Water for Best Contemporary Christian Music Album, and the title track being nominated for the Best Contemporary Christian Music Performance/Song. In 2021, the band won the GMA Dove Award for Contemporary Christian Artist of the Year and Pop/Contemporary Album of the Year for Holy Water (2020), and earned a nomination for the Worship Recorded Song of the Year for "God So Loved" at the 52nd GMA Dove Awards.

== History ==
On August 16, 2019, We the Kingdom released their debut single, "Dancing on the Waves". In September 2019, the band released their second single, "Holy Water". "Holy Water" went on to become the band breakthrough hit single, peaking at No. 2 on the Hot Christian Songs chart. The band released their debut EP, Live at the Wheelhouse, in October 2019. Live at the Wheelhouse reached No. 3 on the Top Christian Albums Chart.

On April 24, 2020, "Don't Tread on Me" was released as the third single from the album. "Don't Tread on Me" peaked at No. 40 on the Hot Christian Songs chart. On May 29, 2020, We the Kingdom was released "God So Loved". "God So Loved" peaked at No. 4 on the Hot Christian Songs chart. On July 3, 2020, We the Kingdom announced that their debut studio album, Holy Water, will be released on August 7, while releasing "Child of Love" as the first promotional single from the album. "No Doubt About It" was released as the second promotional single from Holy Water on July 24, 2020. We the Kingdom released Holy Water on August 7, 2020. The album debuted at No. 4 on the Top Christian Albums Chart. On October 30, 2020, the band released "Light of the World (Sing Hallelujah)" as a standalone single. "Light Of The World (Sing Hallelujah)" peaked at No. 29 on the Hot Christian Songs chart.

At the 51st GMA Dove Awards in October 2020, We the Kingdom was nominated for four awards, these being New Artist of the Year, Song of the Year and Pop/Contemporary Recorded Song of the Year for "Holy Water", and Pop/Contemporary Album of the Year for Live at the Wheelhouse, with the band only winning the New Artist of the Year award. Billboard named We the Kingdom the Top New Christian Artist of 2020.

On January 29, 2021, the band released "Child of Love" featuring Bear Rinehart of Needtobreathe as the fifth single from Holy Water (2020). "Child of Love" peaked at No. 5 on the Hot Christian Songs chart. At the 63rd Annual Grammy Awards in March 2021, We the Kingdom received two nominations, with "Holy Water" being nominated for the Best Contemporary Christian Music Performance/Song, and Holy Water for Best Contemporary Christian Music Album.

We the Kingdom received three nominations for the 2021 GMA Dove Awards for Contemporary Christian Artist of the Year, Pop/Contemporary Album of the Year for Holy Water, and Worship Recorded Song of the Year for "God So Loved", the band winning the GMA Dove Awards for Contemporary Christian Artist of the Year and Pop/Contemporary Album of the Year for Holy Water.

On September 1, 2023, Franni Rae announced that she will depart from the band following the band's remaining live shows of the year. She shared on social media that "God has been prompting a change of seasons in my heart. ..." She is quoted as saying, "I left my band of seven years, not because I was running from something but because I was running toward something," said Cash. "Toward using my voice to tell my story so I could connect on a deeper level."

== Band members ==
=== Current members ===
- Ed Cash – lead vocals, piano, bass guitar, acoustic guitar (2018-present)
- Martin Cash – drums, percussion, backing vocals (2018-present)
- Scott Cash – guitar, vocals (2018-present)
- Andrew Bergthold – keyboard, guitar, vocals (2018-present)

=== Former members ===
- Franni Cash – lead vocals (2018-2023)

== Discography ==
=== Studio albums ===
List of studio albums, with selected chart positions
Title	EP details	Peak chart positions		
Title	EP details	US	US Christ	UK C&G
Holy Water	Released: August 7, 2020; Label: Capitol CMG; Format: CD, digital download, streaming	— (Note: Holy Water did not enter the Billboard 200, but peaked at No. 55 on the Billboard Top Album Sales.)	4	14
We the Kingdom	Released: September 16, 2022; Label: Capitol CMG; Format: CD, LP, digital download, streaming	— (Note: We the Kingdom did not enter the Billboard 200, but peaked at No. 21 on the Billboard Top Album Sales.)	2	—
"—" denotes a recording that did not chart or was not released in that territory.

=== Live albums ===
List of live albums
Title	Album details
Live at Ocean Way Nashville	Released: July 2, 2021; Label: Capitol CMG; Format: Digital download, streaming
Live from the Ryman	Released: July 21, 2023; Label: Capitol CMG; Format: Digital download, streaming

=== Extended plays ===
List of extended plays, with selected chart positions
Title	EP details	Peak chart positions	
Title	EP details	US	US Christ
Live at the Wheelhouse	Released: October 25, 2019; Label: Capitol CMG; Format: CD, digital download, streaming	— (Note: Live at the Wheelhouse did not enter the Billboard 200 chart, but peaked at No. 52 on the Top Album Sales chart.)	3
Live Acoustic Sessions	Released: March 6, 2020; Label: Capitol CMG; Format: digital download, streaming	—	—
The Awakening	Released: September 11, 2020; Label: Capitol CMG; Format: digital download, streaming	—	—
The Battle	Released: September 18, 2020; Label: Capitol CMG; Format: digital download, streaming	—	—
The Journey	Released: October 1, 2020; Label: Capitol CMG; Format: digital download, streaming	—	—
A Family Christmas	Released: October 22, 2021; Label: Capitol CMG; Format: digital download, streaming	—	44
Dear Jesus	Releasing: January 30, 2026; Label: Capitol CMG; Formats: CD, LP, digital download, streaming	—	—
Everything I Thought Was Pleasure	Releasing: June 12, 2026; Label: Capitol CMG; Formats: CD, digital download, streaming	—	—
"—" denotes a recording that did not chart or was not released in that territory.

=== Singles ===
Single	Year	Chart positions					Certifications	Album
Single	Year	US Bubb.	US Christ	US Christ Air.	US Christ AC	US Christ Digital	Certifications	Album
"Dancing on the Waves"	2019	—	29	23	21	—		Holy Water
"Holy Water"	2019	6	2	1	1	1	RIAA: Platinum	Holy Water
"Christmas Day" (with Chris Tomlin)	2019	—	20	10	2	—		Christmas Day: Christmas Songs of Worship (EP)
"Don't Tread on Me"	2020	—	40	—	—	9		Holy Water
"God So Loved"	2020	—	4	1	2	20	RIAA: Gold	Holy Water
"Light of the World (Sing Hallelujah)"	2020	—	29	20	16	—		Non-album single
"Child of Love" (featuring Bear Rinehart)	2021	—	5	3	2	8		Holy Water
"Still Can't Sleep on Christmas Eve"	2021	—	—	29	25	—		A Family Christmas (EP)
"Silent Night (Heavenly Peace)" (with Dante Bowe and Maverick City Music)	2021	—	—	24	12	10		A Family Christmas (EP)
"Miracle Power"	2022	—	15	13	13	5		We the Kingdom
"Jesus Does"	2023	—	9	6	7	12		We the Kingdom
"Take It All Back" (with Tauren Wells and Davies.)	2023	—	3	1	1	1	RIAA: Gold	Take It All Back EP
"Christmas in Hawaii"	2023	—	—	—	—	—		Non-album singles
"The Plans"	2024	—	—	—	—	—		Non-album singles
"Church Music"	2024	—	—	—	—	—		Non-album singles
"Won't He Do It"	2024	—	29	17	16	—		Non-album singles
"Rescue Me"	2026	—	15	7	8	—		Dear Jesus (EP)
"—" denotes a recording that did not chart or was not released in that territory.

=== Promotional singles ===
Song	Year	Chart positions		Album
Song	Year	US Christ	US Christ Digital	Album
"Child of Love"	2020	—	—	Holy Water
"No Doubt About It"	2020	—	—	Holy Water
"Left It in the Water"	2022	49	22	We the Kingdom
"God Is on the Throne"	2022	42	—	We the Kingdom
"Don't Let the Darkness"	2025	—	—	Dear Jesus (EP)
"Dear Jesus"	2025	—	—	Dear Jesus (EP)
"Easy"	2026	—	—	Dear Jesus (EP)
"God's Way"	2026	—	—	Everything I Thought Was Pleasure (EP)
"—" denotes a recording that did not chart or was not released in that territory.

=== Other charted songs ===
Song	Year	Chart positions		Album
Song	Year	US Christ	US Christ Digital	Album
"Peace" (with Bethel Music)	2020	48	25	Peace
"Take Me on a Ride"	2021	36	—	Holy Water
"—" denotes a recording that did not chart or was not released in that territory.

=== Other appearances ===
Year	Song	Album
2020	"Dancing on the Waves" (Bethel Music and We the Kingdom)	Peace
2020	"The Blessing" (Bethel Music and We the Kingdom)	Peace
2020	"Reaching for You" (Chris Tomlin featuring We the Kingdom)	Chris Tomlin & Friends
2020	"God So Loved" (Tasha Cobbs Leonard featuring We the Kingdom)	Royalty: Live at the Ryman
2020	"We Three Kings" (Tommee Profitt and We the Kingdom)	The Birth of a King
2020	"God Rest Ye Merry Gentlemen (Hallelujah)" (Rend Collective and We the Kingdom)	A Jolly Irish Christmas, Vol. 2
2021	"The Light in You" (Bethel Music and We the Kingdom)	Peace, Vol. II
2021	"Arrows (I Will Be with You)" (Bethel Music and We the Kingdom)	Peace, Vol. II

== Tours ==
Headlining

- We the Kingdom - Touring the Holy Water Album Tour (2021)
- We the Kingdom Live Tour (2022)
- Castings Crowns and We the Kingdom USA Tour with Casting Crowns (2022)

Supporting

- Winter Jam 2021 Tour with Crowder (2021)
- My People Tour with Crowder, Anne Wilson and Patrick Mayberry (2022)

== Awards and nominations ==
=== Billboard Music Awards ===
Year	Nominee / work	Award	Result	Ref.
2021	Holy Water	Top Christian Album	Nominated	

=== GMA Dove Awards ===
Year	Nominee / work	Award	Result	Ref.
2020	We the Kingdom	New Artist of the Year	Won	
2020	"Holy Water"	Song of the Year	Nominated	
2020	"Holy Water"	Pop/Contemporary Recorded Song of the Year	Nominated	
2020	Live at the Wheelhouse	Pop/Contemporary Album of the Year	Nominated	
2021	We the Kingdom	Contemporary Christian Artist of the Year	Won	
2021	Holy Water	Pop/Contemporary Album of the Year	Won	
2021	"God So Loved"	Worship Recorded Song of the Year	Nominated	
2022	We the Kingdom	Artist of the Year	Nominated	
2022	A Family Christmas	Christmas/Special Event Album of the Year	Nominated	

=== Grammy Awards ===
Year	Nominee / work	Award	Result	Ref.
2021	"Holy Water"	Best Contemporary Christian Music Performance/Song	Nominated	
2021	Holy Water	Best Contemporary Christian Music Album	Nominated	
