= Light of the World (Sing Hallelujah) =

2020 song by We the Kingdom

Single by We the Kingdom
- Released: October 30, 2020
- Recorded: 2020
- Genre: Contemporary Christian music; Christmas
- Length: 4:20
- Label: Capitol CMG
- Songwriter(s): Ed Cash; Scott Cash; Franni Cash; Martin Cash; Andrew Bergthold
- Producer(s): We the Kingdom

We the Kingdom singles chronology
"God So Loved" (2020)	"Light of the World (Sing Hallelujah)" (2020)	"Child of Love" (2021)

Music videos
- "Light of the World (Sing Hallelujah)" (Acoustic) on YouTube
- "Light of the World (Sing Hallelujah)" (Lyrics) on YouTube

"Light of the World (Sing Hallelujah)" is a song by We the Kingdom that was released as a standalone single, on October 30, 2020. The song was written by Andrew Bergthold, Ed Cash, Franni Cash, Martin Cash, and Scott Cash.

"Light of the World (Sing Hallelujah)" peaked at No. 29 on the US Hot Christian Songs chart.

== Background ==
On October 30, 2020, We the Kingdom released "Light of the World (Sing Hallelujah)" accompanied by an audio video of the song. Ed Cash shared the message of the song, saying:

We've all had darkness in our own lives and we're so thankful that God in His mercy has brought His Light to the world to shine into those place.

== Composition ==
"Light of the World (Sing Hallelujah)" is composed in the key of D with a tempo of 54 beats per minute and a musical time signature of 6/8. The singers' vocal range spans from F♯_{3} to C♯_{5}.

== Commercial performance ==
"Light of the World (Sing Hallelujah)" made its debut at No. 39 on the US Hot Christian Songs chart dated December 12, 2020, following its commercial release. It went on to peak at number 29 on the chart, and spent a total of four consecutive weeks on Hot Christian Songs Chart.

== Music videos ==
The official audio video of "Light of the World (Sing Hallelujah)" was published on We the Kingdom's YouTube channel on October 30, 2020. We the Kingdom released the lyric video of the song on November 20, 2020. The acoustic performance video of the song was released on December 8, 2020, on YouTube.

== Credits ==
Adapted from AllMusic.

- Jesse Brock — mixing assistant
- Warren David — mixing assistant
- Joe LaPorta — mastering engineer
- Sean Moffitt — mixing
- We the Kingdom — primary artist, producer

== Charts ==
Weekly chart performance for "Light of the World (Sing Hallelujah)"
Chart (2020)	Peak position
US Christian Songs (Billboard)	29
US Christian Airplay (Billboard)	20
US Christian AC (Billboard)	16

== Release history ==
Region	Date	Format	Label	Ref.
Various	October 30, 2020	Digital download; streaming	Capitol Christian Music Group	
