= The Heart and Difference Maker =

"The Heart + Difference Maker"

Single by Needtobreathe

from the album Rivers in the Wasteland
- Released: January 14, 2014
- Length: 9:25
- Label: Atlantic, Word, Curb
- Songwriters: Bear Rinehart, Bo Rinehart
- Producers: "The Heart": Joe Chiccarelli, Needtobreathe, Jarrod Rettis; "Difference Maker: Chiccarelli, Needtobreathe

Needtobreathe singles chronology
"Devil's Been Talkin'" (2012)	"The Heart + Difference Maker" (2014)	"State I'm In" (2014)

"The Heart" and "Difference Maker" (styled "The Heart + Difference Maker") are the two lead singles from Needtobreathe's fifth studio album Rivers in the Wasteland. It was released on January 14, 2014, by Atlantic Records, Word Records and Curb Records, and the songs were written by Bear and Bo Rinehart. The band Needtobreate performed "The Heart" on Conan (February 20, 2014), The Ellen DeGeneres Show (April 18, 2014), Late Show with David Letterman (April 23, 2014), and CBS This Morning: Saturday (May 3, 2014),

== Track listing ==
All tracks are written by Bear and Bo Rinehart.

No.	Title	Length
1.	"The Heart"	3:45
2.	"Difference Maker"	5:40
Total length:		9:25

== Weekly charts ==
=== The Heart ===
Chart (2014)	Peak position
Christian Songs (Billboard)	13
Christian Digital Songs (Billboard)	2
Rock Digital Songs (Billboard)	37
Triple A (Billboard)	28

=== Difference Maker ===
Chart (2014)	Peak position
Christian Songs (Billboard)	16
Christian AC/CHR (Billboard)	13
Christian Airplay (Billboard)	38
Christian Digital Songs (Billboard)	3
Rock Digital Songs (Billboard)	46
Hot Single Sales (Billboard)	14
