= The State I'm In (Louie Louie album) =

Studio album by Louie Louie
- Released: April 1990
- Genre: Pop rock; R&B
- Length: 45:00
- Label: WTG; Epic
- Producer: Frankie Blue; Les Pierce

Louie Louie chronology
The State I'm In (1990)	Let's Get Started (1993)

Singles from The State I'm In
- 1. "Sittin' in the Lap of Luxury" Released: 1990; 2. "I Wanna Get Back with You" Released: 1990; 3. "Rodeo Clown" Released: 1990

Professional ratings
Review scores
Source	Rating
AllMusic	4/5 stars
Select	2/5

The State I'm In is the debut album by the American musician Louie Louie. It was released in April 1990 via WTG Records in the US and on July 30, 1990, via Epic Records in the UK. It is his only album to date to chart on the Billboard 200, peaking at No. 136. The lead single "Sittin' in the Lap of Luxury" is also his only hit so far on the Billboard Hot 100, peaking at No. 19.

== Track listing ==
All music is composed by Frankie Blue and Les Pierce.

No.	Title	Writer(s)	Length
1.	"The State I'm In"	Louie Louie	3:22
2.	"Sittin' in the Lap of Luxury"	Louie Louie; Les Pierce	4:04
3.	"I Wanna Get Back with You"	Philip Bailey; Louie Louie; Danny Sembello; Marti Sharron	3:51
4.	"Mata Hari"	Louie Louie; Les Pierce	4:13
5.	"Penny Lady"	Paul Ahlefeld; Frankie Blue; Gino Garcia; Louie Louie; Sam Masa-Rani	5:03
6.	"Stop Lookin' for Someone Else"	Louie Louie; Les Pierce	4:04
7.	"Hurt Baby"	Louie Louie	3:17
8.	"Let Me Divorce You"	Louie Louie	5:53
9.	"I'm Sorry That It Happened to You"	Paul Ahlefeld; Gino Garcia; Louie Louie; Sam Masa-Rani	3:52
10.	"Variety Is the Spice of Life"	Louie Louie; Les Pierce	3:57
11.	"Rodeo Clown"	Louie Louie	3:31
Total length:			45:00

== Charts ==
Chart performance for The State I'm In
Chart (1990)	Peak position
Australian Albums (ARIA)	117
US Billboard 200	136
