= Brother (Needtobreathe song) =

Single by Needtobreathe

from the album Rivers in the Wasteland
- Released: February 2, 2015
- Genre: Christian rock; pop rock
- Length: 4:51 (album version); 3:28 (featuring Gavin DeGraw)
- Label: Atlantic; Warner
- Songwriters: Bear Rinehart; Bo Rineheart
- Producers: Dave Tozer; Ed Cash; Needtobreathe

Needtobreathe singles chronology
"Multiplied" (2014)	"Brother" (2015)	"Happiness" (2016)

"Brother" is a song recorded by American Christian rock band Needtobreathe. It was released as the fifth single from the band's fifth studio album Rivers in the Wasteland on February 2, 2015. The official single version features Gavin DeGraw and was released to Hot AC radio on May 4, 2015. The song was written by Bear and Bo Rinehart, and produced by Dave Tozer, using elements of Ed Cash's LP version. The song peaked at number 8 on Billboard Hot Rock Songs, number 1 on Billboard Hot Christian Songs, and number 98 on the Billboard Hot 100, becoming the band's first Hot 100 chart entry.

== Critical reception ==
Entertainment Weekly's Madison Vain stated "[Brother] is full, anthemic, a little bit woodsy, and alarmingly catchy." and claimed that "[Bear Rinehart's] sincerity is unmistakable in his vocals, and the bluegrass backing culminates in something sweetly rich." Pailey Martin of Billboard called it a "heartfelt track". BreatheCast's Jeannie Law said it was an "unforgettable collaboration" and that "[Bear Rinehart's] raw vocals, and the bluegrass backing truly make the song a powerful anthem." Jeff Koch of PopMatters called it "cheesy" and said that "[Brother] is practically begging to be used in the background of some Grey's Anatomy montage."

== Track listing ==
Digital download
No.	Title	Length
1.	"Brother" (album version)	4:49

Digital download and vinyl
No.	Title	Length
1.	"Brother" (featuring Gavin DeGraw)	3:28
2.	"Brother" (acoustic)	3:35

Digital download
No.	Title	Length
1.	"Brother" (radio version)	3:29

== Charts ==
=== Weekly charts ===
Chart (2014–15)	Peak position
US Billboard Hot 100	98
US Adult Pop Airplay (Billboard)	20
US Hot Christian Songs (Billboard)	1
US Christian Airplay (Billboard)	5
US Christian AC (Billboard)	6
US Hot Rock & Alternative Songs (Billboard)	8

=== Year-end charts ===
Chart (2015)	Position
US Hot Christian Songs (Billboard)	3
US Christian Airplay (Billboard)	12
US Christian CHR (Billboard)	1
US Christian AC (Billboard)	16
US Hot Rock Songs (Billboard)	18

=== Decade-end charts ===
Chart (2010s)	Position
US Christian Songs (Billboard)	7

== Certifications ==
Region	Certification	Certified units/sales
United States (RIAA)	2× Platinum	2,000,000^{‡}
^{‡} Sales+streaming figures based on certification alone.

== Release history ==
Region	Date	Format	Label	Ref.
United States	February 2, 2015	Digital download	Atlantic Records; Warner Music Group	
United States	February 2, 2015	Digital download; 7" vinyl	Atlantic Records; Warner Music Group	
United States	May 4, 2015	Hot AC Radio	Atlantic Records; Warner Music Group	
