= Louie Louie (musician) =

Puerto Rican and American musician (1962–2026)

Louis Edmond Cordero (July 10, 1962 – March 20, 2026), better known as Louie Louie, was a Puerto Rican musician, record producer, and actor. He released four full-length albums (two of them on major record labels and one under his real name of Louie Cordero), as well as a number of singles, but only two of the singles, 1990's "Sittin' in the Lap of Luxury" and "I Wanna Get Back with You", charted in the United States.

== Life and career ==
Louis Edmond Cordero was born on July 10, 1962. He played Madonna's boyfriend in the video for "Borderline" and also played Rick in House Party 2.

He and his band performed on Arsenio Hall two times. Louie toured the United States and Canada with Erasure.

Louie Louie died on March 20, 2026, at the age of 63.

== Discography ==
=== Albums ===
List of albums, with selected details and chart positions
Title	Details	Peak chart positions	
Title	Details	US	AUS
The State I'm In	Released: April 1990; Label: WTG; Formats: CD, CS, LP	136	177
Let's Get Started	Released: February 9, 1993; Label: Warner Bros.; Formats: CD, CS	—	—
Louie Cordero (as Louie Cordero)	Released: January 1996; Label: Trauma; Format: CD	—	—
Dance Love Work	Released: 2002; Label: DLW; Format: CD	—	—
"—" denotes a recording that did not chart or was not released in that territory.

=== Singles ===
List of singles, with selected chart positions, showing year released and album name
Title	Year	Peak chart positions			Album
Title	Year	AUS	US	UK	Album
"The Girl Who Seduced the World"	1987	—	—	—	Non-album single
"Sittin' in the Lap of Luxury"	1990	51	19	—	The State I'm In
"I Wanna Get Back with You"	1990	—	69	—	The State I'm In
"Rodeo Clown"	1990	144	—	—	The State I'm In
"The Thought of It"	1993	183	—	34	Let's Get Started
"Brother Louie"	1993	—	—	92	Let's Get Started
"Walk with Me"	1993	—	—	196	Let's Get Started
"Don't Say You Love Me"	1996	—	—	—	Louie Cordero
"Ain't No Woman (Like the One I've Got)"	1996	—	—	—	Louie Cordero
"Mad Love"	2002	—	—	—	Dance Love Work
"—" denotes a recording that did not chart or was not released in that territory.
