= State I'm In (song) =

Single by Needtobreathe

from the album Rivers in the Wasteland
- Released: February 17, 2014
- Length: 3:19
- Label: Atlantic; Curb; Word
- Songwriters: Bear Rinehart; Bo Rinehart
- Producers: Joe Chiccarelli; Kevin Augunas; Needtobreathe

Needtobreathe singles chronology
"The Heart + Difference Maker" (2014)	"State I'm In" (2014)	"Wasteland" (2014)

"State I'm In" is the third single from American Christian rock band Needtobreathe's fifth studio album, Rivers in the Wasteland. It was released on February 17, 2014, by Atlantic, Curb, and Word Records, and the song was written by Bear and Bo Rinehart. On May 3, 2014, the band performed the song "State I'm In" on CBS This Morning: Saturday, as a web exclusive bonus.

== Track listing ==
All tracks are written by Bear and Bo Rinehart.

No.	Title	Length
1.	"State I'm In"	3:19
Total length:		3:19

== Charts ==
Chart (2014)	Peak position
US Hot Christian Songs (Billboard)	11
US Hot Rock & Alternative Songs (Billboard)	45
