= Needtobreathe discography =

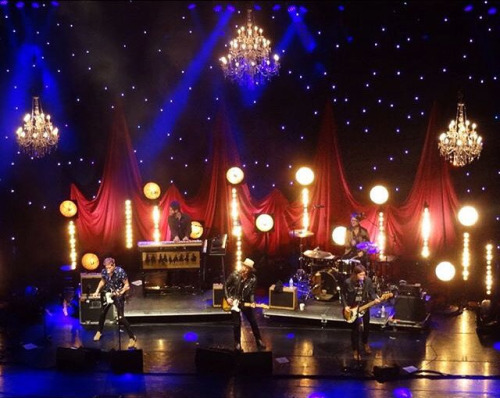
- Needtobreathe performing at the Fox Theatre in Atlanta, Georgia, December 2015
- Studio albums: 10
- EPs: 12
- Live albums: 5
- Singles: 66
- Promotional singles: 6
- Music videos: 31

The discography of American alternative rock band Needtobreathe consists of ten studio albums, five live albums, twelve extended plays and more than sixty singles. Eight of the albums charted in the Billboard 200 with Hard Love reaching No. 2. The band was signed to Atlantic Records until 2020; they released Out of Body and Into the Mystery under the Elektra Records label. CAVES and subsequent music have been released independently under Drive All Night Records. Needtobreathe has been classified as a Christian rock act, with distributors Sparrow Records and Word Records.

== Albums ==
=== Independent albums ===
List of albums and tracklists
Title and details	Track listing
The Feature: Type: Album; Released: 2001; Format: CD	No. / Title / Length; 1. / "Intro" / 1:37; 2. / "Separated" / 2:36; 3. / "Chris" / 3:27; 4. / "Leave the Light On" / 6:04; 5. / "Rockstar" / 3:00; 6. / "Little Bit" / 4:22; 7. / "Next Time" / 4:25; 8. / "Cries" / 3:31; 9. / "Teach Me" / 4:41; 10. / "Everybody" / 4:16; 11. / "Fade" / 4:34
Soulrock Review: Type: EP; Released: 2003; Format: CD	No. / Title / Length; 1. / "Mysteries"; 2. / "Hollywould"; 3. / "City Lights" / 4:48
Turnaround: Type: EP; Released: 2003; Format: CD	No. / Title / Length; 1. / "Mazes" / 3:52; 2. / "Make Me" / 3:29; 3. / "Turnaround" / 3:33; 4. / "Sweet Talker" / 4:12
Fire: Type: EP; Released: 2004; Format: CD	No. / Title / Length; 1. / "You Are Here" / 3:19; 2. / "Fire" / 3:44; 3. / "Haley" / 3:22; 4. / "Lifeboat" / 3:18
A Collection of the Fire and Turnaround EPs: Type: Compilation; Released: 2004; Format: CD	CD 1: Fire EP (2004): No. / Title / Length; 1. / "You Are Here" / 3:19; 2. / "Fire" / 3:44; 3. / "Haley" / 3:22; 4. / "Lifeboat" / 3:18; CD 2: Turnaround EP (2003): No. / Title / Length; 1. / "Mazes" / 3:52; 2. / "Make Me" / 3:29; 3. / "Turnaround" / 3:33; 4. / "Sweet Talker" / 4:12

=== Studio albums ===
List of studio albums, with selected chart positions, sales figures and certifications
Title	Album details	Peak chart positions										Sales	Certifications
Title	Album details	US	US Alt.	US Christ	US Rock	AUS	CAN	NZ Heat.	SCO	SWI	UK	Sales	Certifications
Daylight	Released: April 4, 2006 (US); Label: Lava, Atlantic, Sparrow; Formats: CD, LP, digital download, streaming	—	—	—	—	—	—	—	—	—	—		
The Heat	Released: August 28, 2007 (US); Label: Atlantic, Word; Formats: CD, LP, digital download, streaming	164	—	11	—	—	—	—	—	—	—		
The Outsiders	Released: August 25, 2009 (US); Label: Atlantic, Word; Formats: CD, LP, digital download, streaming	20	7	2	9	—	—	—	—	—	—	US: 21,000	RIAA: Gold
The Reckoning	Released: September 20, 2011 (US); Label: Atlantic, Word; Formats: CD, LP, digital download, streaming	6	—	1	1	—	—	—	—	—	—	US: 49,000	
Rivers in the Wasteland	Released: April 15, 2014 (US); Label: Atlantic; Formats: CD, LP, digital download, streaming	3	1	1	1	—	6	—	—	—	171	US: 49,000	
Hard Love	Released: July 15, 2016 (US); Label: Atlantic; Formats: CD, LP, digital download, streaming	2	1	1	1	46	11	6	56	50	159	US: 50,000	
Out of Body	Released: August 28, 2020; Label: Elektra, Centricity; Formats: CD, LP, digital download, streaming	17	2	1	2	—	69	—	—	—	— (Note: Out of Body did not enter the UK Albums Chart, but peaked at number 49 on the UK Album Downloads Chart.)	US: 23,000	
Into the Mystery	Released: July 30, 2021; Label: Elektra, Centricity; Formats: CD, LP, digital download, streaming	56	—	1	9	—	—	—	—	—	— (Note: Into the Mystery did not enter the UK Albums Chart, but peaked at number 60 on the UK Album Downloads Chart.)	US: 13,000	
Caves	Released: September 15, 2023; Label: Drive All Night Records; Formats: CD, digital download, streaming	131	—	1	—	—	—	—	—	—	—	US: 10,000	
The Long Surrender	Released: March 27, 2026; Label: MCA Nashville, Drive All Night/UMG; Formats: CD, LP, digital download, streaming	— (Note: The Long Surrender did not enter the Billboard 200, but peaked at number 23 on the Top Album Sales chart.)	—	6	—	—	—	—	—	—	—		
"—" denotes a recording that did not chart or was not released in that territory.

=== Live albums ===
List of live albums, with selected chart positions
Title	Album details	Peak chart positions			
Title	Album details	US	US Alt.	US Christ.	US Rock
Live from the Woods at Fontanel	Released: April 14, 2015 (US); Label: Atlantic, Word; Formats: CD, LP, digital download, streaming	58	8	2	9
Acoustic Live Vol. 1	Released: November 16, 2018; Label: Atlantic; Formats: CD, LP, digital download, streaming	112	11	3	20
Live from the Woods Vol. 2	Released: April 16, 2021; Label: Elektra, Centricity; Formats: CD, LP, digital download, streaming	—	—	6	—
Live from Bridgestone Arena	Released: May 25, 2022; Label: Drive All Night Records; Formats: Digital download, streaming	—	—	40	—
The London Tapes – Live from O2 Shepherd's Bush Empire	Released: December 27, 2024; Label: Drive All Night Records; Formats: Digital download, streaming	—	—	—	—
"—" denotes a recording that did not chart or was not released in that territory.

== Extended plays ==
List of extended plays, with selected chart positions
Title	Extended play details	Peak chart positions			
Title	Extended play details	US	US Alt.	US Christ.	US Rock
Live Horses EP	Released: October 22, 2010 (US); Label: Atlantic; Formats: CD, digital download, streaming	—	—	18	—
Keep Your Eyes Open EP (Songs from The Reckoning Sessions)	Released: September 18, 2012 (US); Label: Atlantic; Formats: Digital download, streaming	75	19	4	30
Cercas Blancas EP	Released: May 28, 2013 (US); Label: Atlantic; Formats: Digital download, streaming	—	—	32	—
60/50 Ocean Way: The Live Room Sessions	Released: August 19, 2014 (US); Label: Atlantic; Formats: Digital download, streaming	146	—	11	39
Rivers EP	Released: September 18, 2015; Label: Atlantic; Formats: Digital download, streaming	—	—	26	—
Hard Cuts: Songs from the Hard Love Sessions	Released: August 11, 2017; Label: Atlantic; Formats: CD, digital download, streaming	— (Note: Hard Cuts: Songs from the Hard Love Sessions did not chart on the Billboard 200, but peaked at No. 100 on the Top Current Albums chart.)	— (Note: Hard Cuts: Songs from the Hard Love Sessions did not chart on the Alternative Albums chart, but peaked at No. 16 on the Alternative Albums Sales chart.)	5	— (Note: Hard Cuts: Songs from the Hard Love Sessions did not chart on the Top Rock Albums chart, but peaked at No. 29 on the Rock Album Sales chart.)
Forever on Your Side (Niles City Sound Sessions)	Released: July 13, 2018 (US); Label: Atlantic; Formats: CD, LP, digital download, streaming	— (Note: Forever on Your Side (Niles City Sound Sessions) did not chart on the Billboard 200, but peaked at No. 51 on the Top Album Sales chart and at No. 17 on the Top Digital Albums chart.)	— (Note: Forever on Your Side (Niles City Sound Sessions) did not chart on the Alternative Albums chart, but peaked at No. 7 on the Alternative Album Sales chart.)	3	— (Note: Forever on Your Side (Niles City Sound Sessions) did not chart on the Top Rock Albums chart, but peaked at No. 15 on the Rock Album Sales chart.)
The Campfire EP	Released: March 5, 2021; Label: Elektra, Centricity; Formats: CD, digital download, streaming	—	—	—	—
The River EP	Released: March 12, 2021; Label: Elektra, Centricity; Formats: CD, digital download, streaming	—	—	—	—
The Sunday EP	Released: March 19, 2021; Label: Elektra, Centricity; Formats: CD, digital download, streaming	—	—	30	—
The Redemption EP	Released: March 26, 2021; Label: Elektra, Centricity; Formats: CD, digital download, streaming	—	—	—	—
The Drive EP	Released: April 2, 2021; Label: Elektra, Centricity; Formats: CD, digital download, streaming	—	—	—	—
"—" denotes a recording that did not chart or was not released in that territory.

== Singles ==
List of singles, with selected chart positions and certifications, showing year released and album name
Title	Year	Peak chart positions										Certifications	Album
Title	Year	US	US Adult	US Alt.	US Christ	US Christ Airplay	US Christ. AC	US Rock	AUT	CAN	UK	Certifications	Album
"You Are Here"	2006	—	37	—	—		—	—	—	—	—		Daylight
"Shine On"	2006	—	—	—	6		8	—	—	—	—		Daylight
"Don't Wait for Daylight"	2007	—	—	—	—		—	—	—	—	—		Daylight
"Haley"	2007	—	—	—	—		—	—	—	—	—		Daylight
"Signature of Divine (Yahweh)"	2007	—	—	—	15		30	—	—	—	—		The Heat
"More Time"	2007	— (Note: "More Time" did not enter the Billboard Hot 100, but peaked at No. 23 on the Bubbling Under Hot 100 Singles chart.)	—	—	— (Note: "More Time" did not enter the Hot Christian Songs chart, but peaked at No. 33 on the Christian Digital Songs chart.)		—	—	62	85	86		The Heat
"Washed by the Water"	2008	—	—	—	1		4	—	—	—	—	RIAA: Gold	The Heat
"Streets of Gold"	2008	—	—	—	15		21	—	—	—	—		The Heat
"Go Tell It on the Mountain"	2008	—	—	—	26		22	—	—	—	—		Non-album single
"Lay 'Em Down"	2009	—	—	—	8		3	—	—	—	—		The Outsiders
"Something Beautiful"	2009	—	40	—	7		8	—	—	—	—	RIAA: Gold	The Outsiders
"Hurricane"	2010	—	—	31	—		—	—	—	—	—		The Outsiders
"Let Us Love"	2010	—	—	—	24		22	—	—	—	—		The Outsiders
"The Outsiders"	2010	—	—	—	—		—	—	—	—	—		The Outsiders
"Slumber"	2011	—	—	—	26		22	— (Note: "Slumber" did not enter the Hot Rock Songs chart, but peaked at No. 28 on the Rock Digital Songs chart.)	—	—	—		The Reckoning
"Drive All Night"	2011	—	—	—	— (Note: "Drive All Night" did not enter the Hot Christian Songs chart, but peaked at No. 4 on the Christian Digital Songs chart.)		—	—	—	—	—		The Reckoning
"The Reckoning"	2011	— (Note: "The Reckoning" did not enter the Billboard Hot 100, but peaked at No. 17 on the Bubbling Under Hot 100 Singles chart.)	—	—	— (Note: "The Reckoning" did not enter the Hot Christian Songs chart, but peaked at No. 1 on the Christian Digital Songs chart.)		—	— (Note: "The Reckoning" did not enter the Hot Rock Songs chart, but peaked at No. 10 on the Rock Digital Songs chart.)	—	—	—		The Reckoning
"Able"	2012	—	—	—	46		—	—	—	—	—		The Reckoning
"Keep Your Eyes Open"	2012	—	37	—	21		20	—	—	—	—		The Reckoning
"White Fences"	2012	—	—	—	—		—	—	—	—	—		The Reckoning
"Devil's Been Talkin'"	2013	—	—	—	40		—	—	—	—	—		The Reckoning
"The Heart"	2014	—	—	—	13	—	—	— (Note: "The Heart" did not enter the Hot Rock Songs chart, but peaked at No. 37 on the Rock Digital Songs chart.)	—	—	—		Rivers in the Wasteland
"Difference Maker"	2014	—	—	—	16	37	—	— (Note: "Difference Maker" did not enter the Hot Rock Songs chart, but peaked at No. 46 on the Rock Digital Songs chart.)	—	—	—		Rivers in the Wasteland
"State I'm In"	2014	—	—	—	11	—	—	45	—	—	—		Rivers in the Wasteland
"Wasteland"	2014	—	—	— (Note: "Wasteland" did not enter the Alternative Songs chart, but peaked at No. 11 on the Alternative Digital Songs chart.)	4	29	—	22	—	—	—		Rivers in the Wasteland
"Multiplied"	2014	—	—	—	4	5	6	16	—	—	—	RIAA: Platinum	Rivers in the Wasteland
"Brother" (original or featuring Gavin DeGraw)	2015	98	20	—	1	5	6	8	—	—	—	RIAA: 2× Platinum	Rivers in the Wasteland
"Happiness"	2016	—	32	— (Note: "Happiness" did not enter the Alternative Songs chart, but peaked at No. 8 on the Alternative Digital Songs chart.)	5	23	26	18	—	—	—	RIAA: Gold	Hard Love
"Testify"	2016	—	—	—	7	4	4	14	—	—	—	RIAA: Gold	Hard Love
"Hard Love" (original or featuring Andra Day)	2017	—	39	— (Note: "Hard Love" did not enter the Alternative Songs chart, but peaked at No. 17 on the Alternative Digital Songs chart.)	6	4	6	12	—	—	—	RIAA: Gold	Hard Love
"Waiting"	2017	—	—	— (Note: "Waiting" did not enter the Alternative Songs chart, but peaked at No. 24 on the Alternative Digital Songs chart.)	23	—	—	—	—	—	—		Hard Cuts: Songs from the Hard Love Sessions
"Count on Me"	2017	—	—	— (Note: "Count on Me" did not enter the Alternative Songs chart, but peaked at No. 19 on the Alternative Digital Songs chart.)	20	—	—	— (Note: "Count on Me" did not enter the Hot Rock Songs chart, but peaked at No. 23 on the Rock Digital Songs chart.)	—	—	—		Hard Cuts: Songs from the Hard Love Sessions
"Cages"	2017	—	—	—	— (Note: "Cages" did not enter the Hot Christian Songs chart, but peaked at No. 5 on the Christian Digital Songs chart.)	—	—	—	—	—	—		Hard Cuts: Songs from the Hard Love Sessions
"Walking on Water"	2017	—	—	—	12	10	11	26	—	—	—		Hard Cuts: Songs from the Hard Love Sessions
"Bridges Burn"	2018	—	—	— (Note: "Bridges Burn" did not enter the Alternative Songs chart, but peaked at No. 7 on the Alternative Digital Songs chart.)	12	—	—	20	—	—	—		Forever on Your Side (Niles City Sound Sessions)
"Darling"	2018	—	—	— (Note: "Darling" did not enter the Alternative Songs chart, but peaked at No. 10 on the Alternative Digital Songs chart.)	16	—	—	35	—	—	—		Forever on Your Side (Niles City Sound Sessions)
"Bullets"	2018	—	—	—	26	—	—	—	—	—	—		Forever on Your Side (Niles City Sound Sessions)
"Forever on Your Side" (featuring Johnnyswim)	2018	—	—	— (Note: "Forever On Your Side" did not enter the Alternative Songs chart, but peaked at No. 21 on the Alternative Digital Songs chart.)	19	15	20	36	—	—	—		Forever on Your Side (Niles City Sound Sessions)
"Hang On"	2020	—	—	— (Note: "Hang On" did not enter the Alternative Songs chart, but peaked at No. 11 on the Alternative Digital Songs chart.)	24	—	—	33	—	—	—		Out of Body
"Seasons"	2020	—	—	— (Note: "Seasons" did not enter the Alternative Songs chart, but peaked at No. 17 on the Alternative Digital Songs chart.)	30	—	—	— (Note: "Seasons" did not enter the Hot Rock Songs chart, but peaked at No. 17 on the Rock Digital Songs chart.)	—	—	—		Out of Body
"Survival" (featuring Drew and Ellie Holcomb)	2020	—	—	— (Note: "Survival" did not enter the Alternative Songs chart, but peaked at No. 12 on the Alternative Digital Songs chart.)	26	21	18	— (Note: "Survival" did not enter the Hot Rock Songs chart, but peaked at No. 10 on the Rock Digital Songs chart.)	—	—	—		Out of Body
"Who Am I"	2020	—	38	— (Note: "Who Am I" did not enter the Alternative Songs chart, but peaked at No. 13 on the Alternative Digital Songs chart.)	8	6	5	14	—	—	—	RIAA: Gold	Out of Body
"Banks"	2020	—	—	— (Note: "Banks" did not enter the Alternative Songs chart, but peaked at No. 17 on the Alternative Digital Songs chart.)	27	—	—	— (Note: "Banks" did not enter the Hot Rock Songs chart, but peaked at No. 11 on the Rock Digital Songs chart.)	—	—	—		Out of Body
"Silent Night"	2020	—	—	—	29	25	13	— (Note: "Silent Night" did not enter the Hot Rock Songs chart, but peaked at No. 15 on the Rock Digital Songs chart.)	—	—	—		Non-album single
"Into the Mystery"	2021	—	—	—	27	—	—	—	—	—	—		Into the Mystery
"I Wanna Remember" (featuring Carrie Underwood)	2021	—	—	—	20	—	—	— (Note: "I Wanna Remember" did not enter the Hot Rock Songs chart, but peaked at No. 6 on the Rock Digital Songs chart.)	—	—	—		Into the Mystery
"What I'm Here For"	2021	—	—	—	43	—	—	—	—	—	—		Into the Mystery
"Sunshine"	2021	—	—	—	44	—	—	—	—	—	—		Into the Mystery
"Chances"	2021	—	—	—	—	—	—	—	—	—	—		Into the Mystery
"Carry Me" (featuring Jon Foreman)	2021	—	—	—	38	—	—	—	—	—	—		Into the Mystery
"Talk of the Town"	2022	—	—	—	—	—	—	—	—	—	—		Non-album singles
"Hometown Christmas" (featuring Switchfoot and JUDAH.)	2022	—	—	—	—	20	15	—	—	—	—		Non-album singles
"Everknown"	2023	—	—	— (Note: "Everknown" did not enter the Alternative Songs chart, but peaked at No. 16 on the Alternative Digital Songs chart.)	27	—	—	—	—	—	—		Caves
"The Cave"	2023	—	—	—	—	—	—	—	—	—	—		Caves
"Hideaway"	2023	—	—	—	—	—	—	—	—	—	—		Caves
"Temporary Tears" (featuring Foy Vance)	2023	—	—	—	—	—	—	—	—	—	—		Caves
"Wasting Time" (featuring Old Dominion)	2023	—	—	—	48	—	—	—	—	—	—		Caves
"Dreams" (featuring Judah & the Lion)	2023	—	—	—	22	—	—	— (Note: "Dreams" did not enter the Hot Rock Songs chart, but peaked at No. 25 on the Rock Digital Songs chart.)	—	—	—		Caves
"Fall On Me" (featuring Carly Pearce)	2023	—	—	—	14	12	14	—	—	—	—		Caves
"I Don't Wanna Worry"	2023	—	—	—	43	—	—	—	—	—	—		Non-album single
"Banks" (with Jordan Davis)	2024	—	—	—	28	—	—	—	—	—	—		Among Friends
"Buy Dirt" (with Jordan Davis)	2024	—	—	—	—	—	—	—	—	—	—		Among Friends
"I've Got a Story" (with Tori Kelly)	2025	—	—	—	15	19	19	—	—	—	—		House of David (soundtrack)
"Momma Loves Me" (with The Red Clay Strays)	2025	—	—	—	—	—	—	—	—	—	—		The Long Surrender
"Where You Call Home"	2025	—	—	—	—	—	—	—	—	—	—		The Long Surrender
"Last Drink" (original or featuring The Jack Wharff Band)	2026	—	—	—	—	—	—	—	—	—	—		The Long Surrender and the Fellow Passengers of Pain
"Promised Land" (with Drew Holcomb and the Neighbors and Ellie Holcomb)	2026	—	—	—	—	—	—	—	—	—	—		Non-album single
"—" denotes a single that did not chart or was not released in that territory.

=== Promotional singles ===
List of promotional singles, with selected chart positions, showing year released and album name
Title	Year	Peak chart positions	Album
Title	Year	US Christ. Airplay	Album
"The Long Surrender"	2026	39	The Long Surrender
"Highlands"	2026	—	The Long Surrender
"Can't Apologize" (featuring Jonah Kagen)	2026	—	The Long Surrender and the Fellow Passengers of Pain
"Past the Gates" (featuring Anne Wilson)	2026	—	The Long Surrender and the Fellow Passengers of Pain
"Never Gonna Deserve Ya" (featuring Evan Honer)	2026	—	The Long Surrender and the Fellow Passengers of Pain
"Free Fall" (featuring Conner Smith)	2026	—	The Long Surrender and the Fellow Passengers of Pain
"—" denotes a single that did not chart or was not released in that territory.

== Other charted songs ==
List of songs, with selected chart positions, showing year released and album name
Title	Year	Peak chart positions					Album
Title	Year	US AAA	US Christ.	US Christ. Airplay	US Christ. AC	US Rock	Album
"A Place Only You Can Go"	2011	—	— (Note: "A Place Only You Can Go" did not enter the Hot Christian Songs chart, but peaked at No. 8 on the Christian Digital Songs chart.)	—	—	—	The Reckoning
"Learn to Love"	2011	—	— (Note: "Learn to Love" did not enter the Hot Christian Songs chart, but peaked at No. 12 on the Christian Streaming Songs chart.)	—	—	—	The Reckoning
"Feet, Don't Fail Me Now"	2014	—	48	—	—	—	Rivers in the Wasteland
"Rise Again"	2014	—	42	—	—	—	Rivers in the Wasteland
"Money & Fame"	2016	—	19	—	—	50	Hard Love
"No Excuses"	2016	—	37	—	—	—	Hard Love
"When I Sing"	2016	—	48	—	—	—	Hard Love
"Great Night" (featuring Shovels & Rope)	2016	—	34	—	—	—	Hard Love
"Be Here Long"	2016	—	43	—	—	—	Hard Love
"Let's Stay Home Tonight"	2016	—	41	—	—	—	Hard Love
"Clear"	2016	—	42	—	—	—	Hard Love
"Stand by Me" (Acoustic Live)	2018	—	48	—	—	—	Acoustic Live Vol. 1
"Alive"	2020	—	28	—	—	—	Out of Body
"Mercy's Shore"	2020	—	32	—	—	—	Out of Body
"Child Again"	2020	—	36	—	—	—	Out of Body
"Out of Body"	2020	—	39	—	—	—	Out of Body
"Bottom of a Heartbreak"	2020	—	40	—	—	—	Out of Body
"Riding High"	2020	—	42	—	—	—	Out of Body
"O Come, O Come, Emmanuel" (with For King & Country)	2020	—	9	1	1	—	A Drummer Boy Christmas
"I Am Yours"	2021	—	27	20	20	49	Into the Mystery
"When You Forgive Someone"	2023	—	—	24	22	—	Caves
"How Wonderful We Are"	2023	37	—	—	—	—	Caves
"Say It Now"	2026	—	43	—	—	—	The Long Surrender
"—" denotes a song that did not chart or was not released in that territory.

== Music videos ==
List of music videos, showing year released and directors
Title	Year	Notes	Director(s)	Ref.
"Shine On"	2006		Unknown	
"Signature of Divine (Yahweh)"	2007		Unknown	
"Washed by the Water"	2008		Unknown	
"You Are Here"	2009		Unknown	
"Lay 'Em Down"	2010		Unknown	
"Something Beautiful"	2010		Unknown	
"Girl Named Tennessee"	2011		Unknown	
"Drive All Night"	2011		Eric Ryan Anderson	
"Keep Your Eyes Open"	2012		Eric Ryan Anderson, Bo Rinehart	
"Devil's Been Talkin'"	2013		Eric Ryan Anderson	
"The Heart"	2014		Unknown	
"Difference Maker"	2014		Gus Black	
"Multiplied"	2014		Unknown	
"Brother" (feat. Gavin DeGraw)	2015		Jared Hogan	
"Happiness"	2016		Noble Jones	
"Hard Love" (feat. Andra Day)	2017		Unknown	
"Walking on Water"	2017		Gus Black	
"Forever on Your Side" (with Johnnyswim)	2018		Nolan Feldpausch	
"Hang On"	2020		Jared Hogan	
"Who Am I"	2020		Jared Hogan	
"Mercy's Shore"	2020		Jared Hogan	
"Banks"	2020		Chris Phelps	
"Into the Mystery"	2021		Unknown	
"I Wanna Remember" (feat. Carrie Underwood)	2021		Unknown	
"Talk of the Town"	2022		Dylan Reyes	
"Everknown"	2023	This song was used during an episode of SmackDown, dedicated to professional wrestler Bray Wyatt.	Bram VanderMark	
"The Cave"	2023		Bram VanderMark	
"Dreams" (feat. Judah & the Lion)	2023		Gus Black	
"Fall On Me" (feat. Carly Pearce)	2023		Gus Black	
"I've Got a Story" (feat. Tori Kelly)	2025		Unknown	
"Say It Now" (Visualizer)	2026		Unknown	
