= The Long Surrender =

Studio album by Needtobreathe
- Released: March 27, 2026
- Length: 44:25
- Labels: MCA Nashville; Drive All Night
- Producers: Dave Cobb; Needtobreathe

Needtobreathe chronology
Caves (2023)	The Long Surrender (2026)

Singles from The Long Surrender
- 1. "Momma Loves Me" Released: September 5, 2025; 2. "Where You Call Home" Released: November 14, 2025

Alternative cover
- The Long Surrender and the Fellow Passengers of Pain cover

Singles from The Long Surrender and the Fellow Passengers of Pain
- 1. "Last Drink" Released: June 17, 2026

The Long Surrender is the tenth studio album by the American rock band Needtobreathe. The album was released on March 27, 2026, via MCA Nashville and Drive All Night Records to CD, LP, digital download, and streaming formats. The Long Surrender was supported by the release of two singles—"Momma Loves Me" on September 5, 2025, and "Where You Call Home" on November 14, 2025—and two promotional singles: "The Long Surrender" on January 23, 2026, and "Highlands" on February 27. The album was produced by Dave Cobb and written primarily by Bear Rinehart; one song was co-written with John-Luke Carter. It features a guest appearance from the Red Clay Strays. The album peaked at number 23 on the Billboard Top Album Sales chart, and its title track peaked at number 39 on the Billboard Christian Airplay chart.

A deluxe edition of the album, titled The Long Surrender and the Fellow Passengers of Pain, was released on November 19, 2026. Supported by single "Last Drink" on June 17, and promotional singles "Can't Apologize" on September 14, "Past the Gates" on October 8, "Never Gonna Deserve Ya" on October 22, and "Free Fall" on November 5, the album contains six additional tracks as well as guest appearances from the Jack Wharff Band, Jonah Kagen, Anne Wilson, Evan Honer, Conner Smith, and Bre Kennedy.

== Release and promotion ==
The lead single from The Long Surrender, a "comforting ballad" titled "Momma Loves Me", was released on September 5, 2026. The song featured a guest appearance from The Red Clay Strays. On August 27, 2025, the song was announced for upcoming release and made available for preorder. "Momma Loves Me" first came into being after, backstage at a concert in Brooklyn, New York, Rhinehart shared a demo of the song with The Red Clay Strays' frontman Brandon Coleman. Coleman was moved upon hearing the recording, and requested that he be featured on the completed track. A short documentary was premiered exclusively on Rolling Stone to demonstrate the process in which they recorded the song. The song was supported by the release of a lyric video, which was released to YouTube.

On November 14, 2025, Needtobreathe released the second single from The Long Surrender, titled "Where You Call Home". The song "reflects a bittersweet longing for one's place in this world", containing "rich harmonies" and "delicate instrumentation". Rinehart claimed that the song "isn't necessarily about a place", but is more so about "the rituals and reminders that pull us back to who we really are".

On January 23, 2026, the album's title track, "The Long Surrender", was released as the album's first promotional single. That same day, the album was announced for its upcoming release, and alongside the release, was made available for preorder through the band's official website. It was followed by the album's second, and final promotional single, "Highlands", which was released on February 27, 2026. Both releases were promoted by lyric videos, which were uploaded to YouTube.

== Style ==
=== Development ===
The album was produced by Cobb at his own studio in Savannah, Georgia. The album's twelve songs were written by Rhinehart during a "deeply personal, therapeutic writing season". Rhinehart explained the writing process behind the album's creation, saying,

This record's different from any other because we didn't set out to actually make one. I think the album actually found us at a time we really needed it. The whole process of the record was surrendering — surrendering to the process and to all sorts of things going on in our lives... It felt like the record was a gift that wasn't ours to control. I wasn't even thinking about writing a record — I was just trying to get my head around what I wanted my life to look like going forward. This album clarified that I have to put my convictions in front of anything else. In many ways, it feels like our very first record.

=== Composition ===
The album contains string elements. Alli Patton of Holler observed the use of "nimble plucks, a distant beat and resonant keys," which she described as "all-powerful in its simplicity," also containing "gorgeous harmonies and striking lead vocals." Music Corporation of America described it as having "harmonies, keys, slide guitar, and subtle percussion," causing it to be "stripped-down but elegant prayerful." Billboard observed that the album contains "soulful, gospel music-tinged harmonies", demonstrating themes of "forgiveness, grace and gratefulness".

== Tours ==
The album was supported with Needtobreathe touring on the Barely Elegant Acoustic Tour in late 2025. The Barely Elegant Acoustic Tour visited eighteen locations in the United States, beginning November 6, 2025, and continuing until December 7, 2025. In March 2026, they announced The Long Surrender Tour for summer of that year. The tour visited 25 venues in the United States, visiting the first location on August 12, 2026 and the final location on September 20, 2026.

== Reception ==
Professional ratings
Review scores
Source	Rating
Jesus Freak Hideout	3.5/5 stars 3/5 stars

=== Critical ===
The Long Surrender received generally positive reception from critical audiences. Scoring the album 3.5/5, Tincan Caldwell of Jesus Freak Hideout also found that the album "never really takes off tempo-wise" and remains "low-key" and "folky" throughout. Caldwell was critical of this factor and wrote that the album "feels only half-baked". In a second review for Jesus Freak Hideout, Noah Schmidt claimed The Long Surrender to be, in comparison with previous albums, "unarguably the group's most mellow one to date". He was also critical of the "complete lack of upbeat tunes". He appreciated the album's "lyrical depth", but failed to find the production "interesting".

=== Commercial ===
Within its first charting frame, The Long Surrender debuted on the Billboard Top Album Sales chart at number 23. Additionally, it appeared at number 22 on the Top Americana/Folk Albums chart and number 6 on the Top Christian Albums chart. The album contained two charted tracks: "Say It Now", which entered the Hot Christian Songs chart at number 43 upon the release of the album, and "The Long Surrender", which reached number 40 on the Christian Airplay chart later that year.

== Track listing ==
All tracks are written by Bear Rinehart, except where noted.

The Long Surrender track listing
No.	Title	Writer(s)	Length
1.	"The Long Surrender"		3:45
2.	"Say It Now"		3:53
3.	"Highlands"		3:44
4.	"Sing to Me Savannah"		4:09
5.	"Where You Call Home"		3:43
6.	"Strangeness of It All"	Rinehart; John-Luke Carter	3:37
7.	"Take Me Dancing"		4:04
8.	"The Door"		3:18
9.	"Growing Slow"		2:46
10.	"Momma Loves Me" (with the Red Clay Strays)		3:29
11.	"Take the Blame"		3:54
12.	"Spread the Ashes"		3:57
Total length:			44:25

The Long Surrender and the Fellow Passengers of Pain track listing
No.	Title	Writer(s)	Length
13.	"Last Drink" (featuring the Jack Wharff Band)		4:01
14.	"Can't Apologize" (featuring Jonah Kagen)	Rinehart; Trent Dabbs	3:22
15.	"Past the Gates" (featuring Anne Wilson)		3:23
16.	"Never Gonna Deserve Ya" (featuring Evan Honer)		3:21
17.	"Free Fall" (featuring Conner Smith)		3:46
18.	"Sparrow" (featuring Bre Kennedy)	Rinehart; Tyler Burkum	3:49

== Personnel ==
Credits adapted from Tidal.

=== Needtobreathe ===
- Bear Rinehart – lead vocals (all tracks), guitar (1, 2, 5–11), production (2, 6, 11, 12), harmonica (11), piano (12)
- Josh Lovelace – background vocals (1, 2, 4–9, 11, 12), piano (1, 3, 4, 6–9, 11), organ (1, 3, 4, 6–8, 12), keyboards (2, 5, 10), production (2, 6, 11, 12), synthesizer (3, 8, 9), vocals (3), mandolin (5), celesta (6), harmonica (9, 10), acoustic guitar (12)
- Randall Harris – drums (1–4, 7–9, 12), percussion (2–5, 8, 10–12), production (2, 6, 11, 12)
- Tyler Burkum – guitar (1–5, 7–11); background vocals, bass guitar (1–5, 7–9, 11, 12); production (2, 6, 11, 12), lap steel guitar (4); acoustic guitar, electric guitar (6); slide guitar (12)

=== Additional contributors ===
- Dave Cobb – production (1, 3–11), percussion (1, 7, 9), mixing (1, 10, 12), guitar (1), acoustic guitar (10)
- Tom Tapley – engineering (1, 3–11)
- Phillip Smith – engineering (2, 12)
- Berto Sewald – additional engineering (5, 6, 8)
- Ethan Barrette – engineering assistance (1, 3–11)
- Jack Emblem – mixing (2–9, 11)
- Pete Lyman – mastering (5, 10)
- Daniel Bacigalupi – mastering (5)
- Bre Kennedy – background vocals (4)
- Maureen Murphy – background vocals (4)
- Jon Truman – drums (6)
- Gideon Boley – lap steel guitar (6)
- Drew Nix – slide guitar (10)
- Brandon Coleman – vocals (10)

== Charts ==
Chart performance for The Long Surrender
Chart (2026)	Peak position
US Americana/Folk Albums (Billboard)	22
US Top Album Sales (Billboard)	23
US Top Christian Albums (Billboard)	6

== Release history ==
Release history and formats for The Long Surrender
Region	Date	Format(s)	Label(s)	Ref.
Various	March 27, 2026	CD; LP; digital download; streaming	MCA Nashville; Drive All Night Records/Universal Music Group	
