= Josh Lovelace =

American singer-songwriter

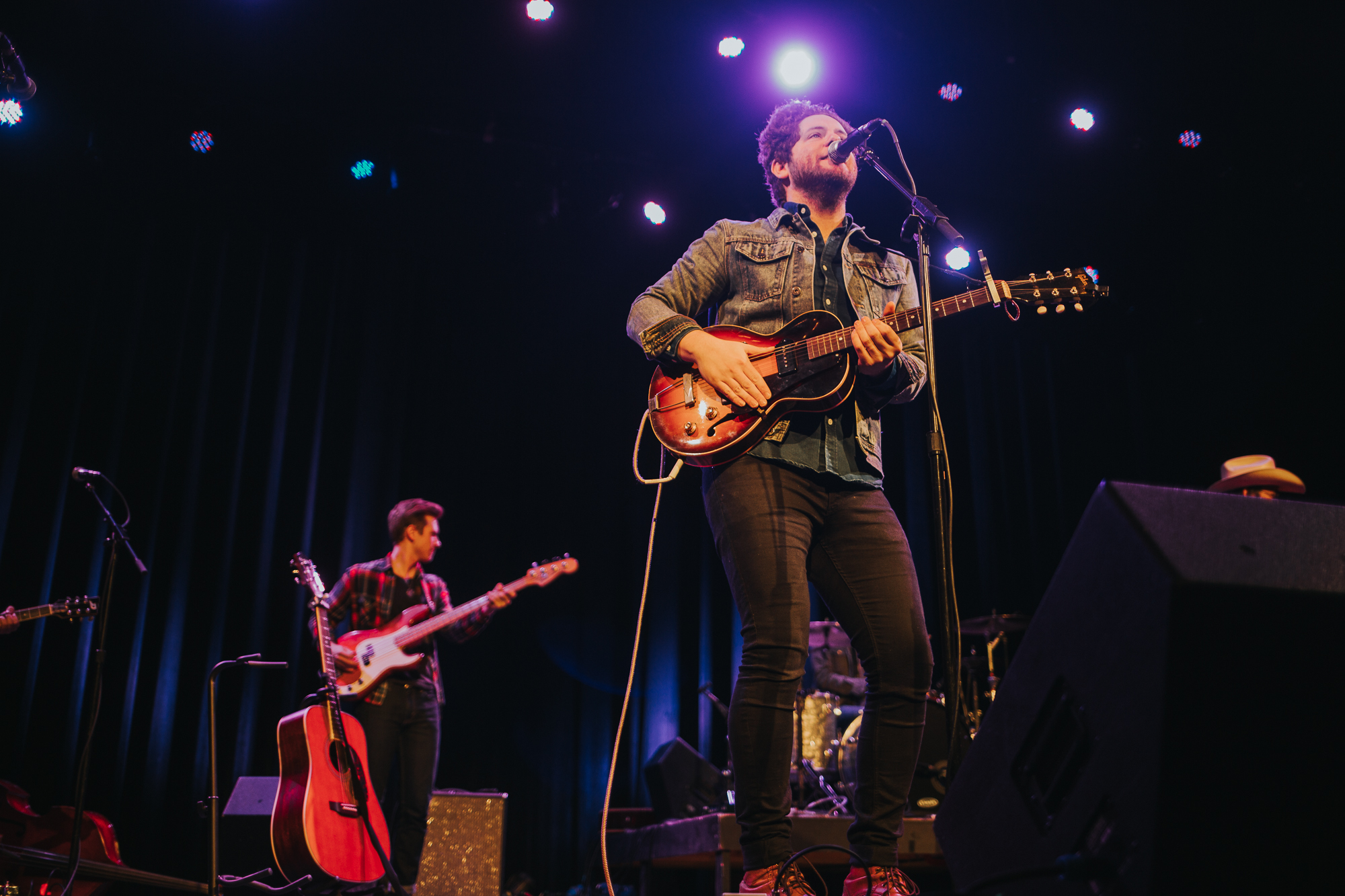
- Josh Lovelace at the Bijou Theatre in Knoxville, TN on November 19, 2017

Background information
- Born: Knoxville, Tennessee
- Instruments: Vocals; piano; keyboards; drums; guitar; bass; accordion; organ; banjo
- Member of: Needtobreathe
- Website: joshlovelacemusic.com

Josh Lovelace is an American singer, songwriter and musician, best known as the keyboardist of the rock band Needtobreathe. In 2017, he made his solo debut with his family-album Young Folk. In 2024, he released his first non-children's solo record Shelters.

== Career ==
=== Needtobreathe ===
In 2011, Lovelace began playing keys with Needtobreathe. Since then, he became a member of the band and played on the albums The Reckoning, Rivers in the Wasteland, Hard Love, Out of Body, Into the Mystery, Caves and The Long Surrender.

=== Young Folk ===
In November 2017, Lovelace released his solo family album Young Folk. Young Folk is the result of a lifelong passion for children's music, which inspired Josh to become a professional musician. Prior to recording, Lovelace became good friends with members of the group Sharon, Lois & Bram, and he considers them mentors. Sharon Hampson and Bram Morrison sing on Young Folk's "Sing a Song for Me". In addition to Sharon Hampson and Bram Morrison, Young Folk features guest appearances by Spirit Family Reunion, Ben Rector and Ellie Holcomb.

He followed up the album with two additional releases for families. Growing Up released in 2019, and Moonwalking released in 2022.

=== Solo career ===
Lovelace released Shelters, his first solo record outside of children's music on October 27, 2024.

== Discography ==
=== With Needtobreathe ===
- The Reckoning (2011)
- Rivers in the Wasteland (2014)
- Hard Love (2016)
- Out of Body (2020)
- Into the Mystery (2021)
- Caves (2023)
- The Long Surrender (2026)

=== As Young Folk ===
- Young Folk (2017)
- Growing Up (2019)
- Moonwalking (2022)

=== As solo artist ===
- Shelters (2024)
