= Into the Mystery =

Studio album by Needtobreathe
- Released: July 30, 2021
- Genre: Alternative rock; Christian rock; Southern rock
- Length: 45:43
- Label: Elektra
- Producer: Needtobreathe; Konrad Snyder

Needtobreathe chronology
Live from the Woods Vol. 2 (2021)	Into the Mystery (2021)	Caves (2023)

Singles from Into the Mystery
- 1. "Into the Mystery" Released: May 6, 2021; 2. "I Wanna Remember" Released: May 20, 2021; 3. "What I'm Here For" Released: June 3, 2021; 4. "Sunshine" Released: June 18, 2021; 5. "Chances" Released: July 1, 2021; 6. "Carry Me" Released: July 15, 2021

Professional ratings
Review scores
Source	Rating
AllMusic	4/5 stars

Into the Mystery is the eighth studio album by American rock band Needtobreathe, released on July 30, 2021, through Elektra Records.

== Background ==
Following the 2020 release of their seventh studio album, Out of Body, and the early-2021 release of live album Live from the Woods Vol. 2, Needtobreathe announced the upcoming release of studio album Into the Mystery on April 26, 2021. After the band's tentative Out of Body Tour was cancelled due to the COVID-19 pandemic, Needtobreathe spent 21 days living together and recording Into the Mystery in Tennessee. The title track, "Into the Mystery" was released as the first single from the album on May 6, 2021. Subsequent singles released include "I Wanna Remember" (featuring Carrie Underwood), "What I'm Here For", "Sunshine", "Chances", and "Carry Me" (featuring Jon Foreman of Switchfoot). A film chronicling the album recording process was released via Greenwich Entertainment in theaters for a one-night-only event on November 3, 2021, though it was made available on-demand three weeks later on November 23, 2021.

== Promotion ==
Needtobreathe announced the Into the Mystery Tour along with the announcement of the upcoming album on April 26, 2021. The band revealed tour guests to be the New Respects and Switchfoot on April 29 and 30, 2021, respectively. The Into the Mystery Tour began in St. Louis, Missouri on September 7, 2021 and concluded in Atlanta, Georgia on October 30, 2021. Needtobreathe performed "I Wanna Remember" with Carrie Underwood at Bonnaroo Farm during the 2021 CMT Music Awards, which aired on CMT on June 9, 2021. The band later performed "Into the Mystery" on The Late Show with Stephen Colbert.

== Track listing ==
All tracks are written by Bear Rinehart, except where noted

No.	Title	Writer(s)	Length
1.	"What I'm Here For"		3:47
2.	"Into the Mystery"		3:54
3.	"Sunshine"		3:26
4.	"Carry Me"		3:40
5.	"I Am Yours"		4:36
6.	"Chances"		2:58
7.	"Sittin' in the Backseat"		3:56
8.	"Give Me a Chance"		3:36
9.	"Don't Throw All the Good Things Away" (featuring Natalie Hemby)	Natalie Hemby; Rinehart	4:10
10.	"Innocence"		3:58
11.	"I Wanna Remember" (with Carrie Underwood)	Jordan Reynolds; Rinehart; Parker Welling	3:33
12.	"West Texas Wind"		4:09
Total length:			45:43

== Personnel ==
Artist	Credit(s)
Seth Bolt	Bass, Percussion, Vocals
Chris Brown	Marketing
Tyler Burkum	Guitar (Acoustic), Guitar (Electric), Vocals (Background)
Steve Bursky	Management
Laura Epling	Violin
Jon Foreman	Featured Artist
Randall Harris	Banjo, Drums, Guitar (Acoustic), Percussion, Vocals
Natalie Hemby	Featured Artist
Mary Hooper	Cover Design, Creative Director
David Leonard	Organ
Josh Lovelace	Guitar (Acoustic), Harmonica, Mandola, Organ, Piano, Synthesizer, Vocals
Jeremy Lutito	Drums, Percussion
Chelsea McGough	Cello
Sean Moffitt	Mixing
Dustin Reynolds	Director
William Rinehart	Guitar (Acoustic), Guitar (Electric), Mandola, Programming, Synthesizer, Vocals
Konrad Snyder	Engineer, Producer
Joe Stillwell	Drums
Carrie Underwood	Featured Artist

== Charts ==
Chart performance for Into the Mystery
Chart (2021)	Peak position
US Billboard 200	56
US Top Christian Albums (Billboard)	1
US Top Rock Albums (Billboard)	9

Chart performance for singles from Into the Mystery on Billboard song charts
Song	Chart	Peak position	Peak date
"Carry Me"	Hot Christian Songs	38	July 31, 2021
"I Am Yours"	Hot Christian Songs	27	August 14, 2021
"I Am Yours"	Christian Airplay	20	February 12, 2022
"I Am Yours"	Hot Rock & Alternative Songs	49	January 15, 2022
"Into the Mystery"	Hot Christian Songs	27	May 22, 2021
"Into the Mystery"	Christian Digital Song Sales	13	May 22, 2021
"I Wanna Remember"	Rock Digital Song Sales	6	June 19, 2021
"I Wanna Remember"	Hot Christian Songs	20	June 5, 2021
"I Wanna Remember"	Christian Digital Song Sales	2	June 5, 2021
"Sunshine"	Hot Christian Songs	44	July 3, 2021
"What I'm Here For"	Hot Christian Songs	43	August 14, 2021
