= Out of Body =

Out of Body may refer to:

- "Out of Body" (The Bionic Woman), a 1978 television episode
- "Out of Body" (The Outer Limits), a 1996 television episode
- Out of Body (The Hooters album), 1993
- Out of Body (Gazelle Twin album), 2016
- Out of Body (Needtobreathe album), 2020
- "Out of Body" (Gorillaz song), 2017
- "Out of Body" (Khalid song), 2025

== See also ==
- Out-of-body experience
