= Daylight (Needtobreathe album) =

Studio album by Needtobreathe
- Released: April 4, 2006
- Studios: Plantation Studios (Charleston, South Carolina)
- Genres: Alternative rock; Christian rock; Southern rock
- Length: 39:22
- Labels: Atlantic; Lava; Sparrow
- Producer: Andy Green

Needtobreathe chronology
The Feature (2001)	Daylight (2006)	The Heat (2007)

Singles from Daylight
- 1. "You Are Here" Released: January 17, 2006

Daylight is the debut studio album by American Christian rock band Needtobreathe. It was released on April 4, 2006, by Atlantic, Lava, and Sparrow Records.

== Critical reception ==
Professional ratings
Review scores
Source	Rating
AllMusic	3/5 stars
CCM Magazine	A−
Christian Broadcasting Network	3.5/5 stars
Christianity Today	3/5 stars
Cross Rhythms	9/10 squares
Jesus Freak Hideout	4/5 stars
Melodic.net	4.5/5 stars
New Release Tuesday	4/5 stars
The Phantom Tollbooth	4/5 stars

Daylight received generally positive reviews from music critics. At AllMusic, Stephen Thomas Erlewine rated the album three stars, saying the band have made a "friendly, welcoming album" which they don't "stretch boundaries" on and "proudly" so, and noting how the release was "slick yet ingratiating, earnest yet endearing.". Jay Swartzendruber of CCM Magazine Jay Swartzendruber graded the album an A−, and illustrating that the album was "both surprising and engaging musically", and noting that "as far as shortcomings go, you'll have to dig to find one". At Christian Broadcasting Network, Jennifer E. Jones rated the album three-and-a-half stars, and she felt that the release "has a certain charm that's irresistible".

Dave Griffiths of Cross Rhythms rated the album a nine squares out of ten writing, "don't come much more impressive than this one", however he felt that "the arrangement and production is very slick, but most of the songs are perhaps just a little too similar, and they've stuck to the same formula throughout the album. But, there is so much to enjoy here, it just doesn't matter.". At Christianity Today, Christa Banister rated the album three stars, noting that the lyricism was indistinguishable from other acts, yet calling the release "an enjoyable escape with a refreshingly optimistic perspective." Emilio LV of Melodic.net rated the album four-and-a-half stars, referring to the album as being a "marvelous work" that with their "songs and attitude should lead them to the top of mainstream rock charts."

At Jesus Freak Hideout, Andrew Shaw rated the album four stars, alluding to how "Every track is just as addicting but completely different from the one before it, which makes appreciating the whole album difficult because you can never seem to arrive at the end", and he referred to the album as "an astonishing first-effort that could not have come at a better time. With the demise of some of Christian music's greatest acts, it is reassuring to see one group stepping up to the plate with all they got." Kevin Davis of New Release Tuesday rated the album four stars, calling it a "Great album." At The Phantom Tollbooth, Brian A. Shaw rated the album four stars, telling that the album "should place them on solid ground."

== Track listing ==
All tracks are written by Bear and Bo Rinehart.

No.	Title	Length
1.	"Don't Wait for Daylight"	3:47
2.	"Quit"	3:27
3.	"Shine On"	4:13
4.	"Don't Leave Just Yet"	3:55
5.	"Haley"	3:22
6.	"You Are Here"	3:19
7.	"Knew It All"	3:10
8.	"More Than"	3:37
9.	"Over Now"	3:36
10.	"Lost"	4:05
11.	"I Won't Look Back"	3:08
Total length:		39:22

== Personnel ==
=== Needtobreathe ===
- Bear Rinehart – lead vocals, guitars, harmonica, keyboards
- Bo Rinehart – guitars
- Seth Bolt – programming, bass guitar, background vocals
- Joe Stillwell – drums, percussion, background vocals

=== Technical ===
- Needtobreathe, Seth Bolt – pre-production
- Andy Green – production, engineering
- Julian Willmott – additional engineering
- Chris Lord-Alge – mixing at Resonate Music (Burbank, California) (tracks 1, 6, 9)
- Shawn Grove – mixing at Tree Sound Studios (Atlanta, Georgia) (tracks 2–5, 7, 8, 10, 11)
- Ted Jensen – mastering at Sterling Sound (New York City, New York)
- Kim Stephens – A&R
- Lesley Melincoff – A&R administration
- Nikki Hirsch – production manager
- Kip Krones – management

=== Design ===
- Yuan Wu – design
- Bo Rinehart – cover painting
- Dave Hill – photography

== Singles ==
- "You Are Here"
- "Don't Wait for Daylight"
- "Shine On"
- "Haley"
