= Signature of Divine (Yahweh) =

Single by Needtobreathe

from the album The Heat
- Released: Summer 2007
- Genre: Christian rock
- Length: 4:04
- Label: Atlantic; Word
- Songwriters: Bear Rinehart; Bo Rinehart
- Producers: Rick Beato; Needtobreathe

Needtobreathe singles chronology
"Haley" (2007)	"Signature of Divine (Yahweh)" (2007)	"More Time" (2007)

Music video
- "Signature of Divine (Yahweh)" on YouTube

"Signature of Divine (Yahweh)" is the first single released off the album The Heat by American Christian rock band Needtobreathe. It was released in the summer of 2007. The song was nominated for the "Rock/Contemporary Song of the Year" Dove Award in 2008.

== Charts ==
The song reached No. 1 on the R&R CHR chart. It also was the No. 14 most played song in 2007 on Christian Hit Radio.

== Reception ==
"Signature of Divine (Yahweh)" received very positive reviews from critics. AllMusic said it "has its share of rich, sweeping gusto". Jesus Freak Hideout also was positive about the song, saying "[T]he record really hits the high note with soaring worship on "Signature of Divine (Yahweh)." It "arguably packs more punch… than a lot of songs coming from the worship genre today."

== Awards ==
In 2008, the song was nominated for a Dove Award for Rock/Contemporary Recorded Song of the Year at the 39th GMA Dove Awards.
