= Lay 'Em Down =

Single by Needtobreathe

from the album The Outsiders
- Released: June 2009
- Genre: Christian rock; Southern rock; CCM
- Label: Atlantic
- Songwriters: Bear Rinehart; Bo Rinehart
- Producers: Rick Beato; Needtobreathe

Needtobreathe singles chronology
| "Go Tell It on the Mountain" (2008) | "Lay 'Em Down" (2009) | "Something Beautiful" (2009) |

"Lay 'Em Down" is the first single released off the album The Outsiders by American Christian rock band Needtobreathe. It was released on June 2009.

== Charts ==
The song reached No. 8 on Billboard's Hot Christian Songs chart, No. 49 on the Heatseekers Songs, and 98 on the Billboard Hot 100.

== Awards ==
In 2010, the song was nominated for a Dove Award for Rock/Contemporary Recorded Song of the Year at the 41st GMA Dove Awards.
