= The Outsiders (Needtobreathe album) =

Studio album by Needtobreathe
- Released: August 25, 2009
- Recorded: Late 2008 – April 2009
- Studios: Plantation Studios (Charleston, SC); Black Dog Sound (Atlanta, Georgia); Plyrz Studios (Santa Clarita, California)
- Genres: Alternative rock; Christian rock; Southern rock; CCM
- Length: 48:49
- Label: Atlantic
- Producers: Jim Scott; John Alagía; Rick Beato; Needtobreathe

Needtobreathe chronology
The Heat (2007)	The Outsiders (2009)	The Reckoning (2011)

Singles from The Outsiders
- 1. "Lay 'Em Down" Released: June 2009; 2. "Something Beautiful" Released: August 2009

The Outsiders is the third studio album by American Christian rock band Needtobreathe, released on August 25, 2009 through Atlantic Records. It debuted at No. 20 on the Billboard 200 chart, selling 21,000 copies in its first week.

== Background ==
The album was recorded from the end of 2008 through April 2009. The Outsiders was co-produced by the band along with Jim Scott, John Alagía, and Rick Beato, who produced portions of their previous album, The Heat. The studios used while recording the album were Plantation Studios in Charleston, South Carolina, Black Dog Sound in Atlanta, Georgia and Plyrz Studios in Santa Clarita, California.

== Release ==
The album's first single, "Lay 'Em Down", was released to Christian radio at the beginning of June 2009 and was released on iTunes on June 16. The next single from the album, "Something Beautiful", was released in August. The album reached No. 20 on the Billboard 200 and No. 9 on Billboard's Top Rock Albums chart.

== Critical reception ==
Professional ratings
Review scores
Source	Rating
AllMusic	4/5 stars
Christian Music Review	7/10 stars
Cross Rhythms	9/10 squares
Indie Vision Music	4/5 stars
Jesus Freak Hideout	4.5/5 stars
Melodic.net	4.5/5 stars
New Release Tuesday	5/5 stars

The Outsiders received widespread acclaim from music critics. At AllMusic, Andrew Leahey rated the album four stars, and suggested that the band "offer[s] up another collection of sweeping, reverent rock songs" on which he alluded to how the album "flirts with touches of roots rock and traditional gospel, though, from the title track's powerful Southern stomp to the sheer power of Bear Rinehart's voice." Furthermore, Leahey noted the album "covers more ground than records by similar artists, and it does so without alienating any of its secular-minded listeners, too." Matt Conner of CCM Magazine indicated in a positive review that the album "brings even more evidence to the table that Rinehart's rock sensibilities only improve with time", and Conner also mentioned that the album's "second half provides some of the most beautiful moments on the record."

At Christian Music Review, Liz Haveman rated the album three-and-a-half stars, and criticized the album because "some of the songs are confusing in their message. They are a little too vague to really grasp what these guys are trying to say." However, she highlighted how "the music itself is really enjoyable. It has a “Jack Johnson”-ish quality to its laid back candor. Over all, the album is really enjoyable and I think it is going to satisfy the Needtobreathe fan base." Ian Webber at Cross Rhythms rated the album nine out of ten squares, and underscored how the band "have crafted an excellent collection of tracks that wrestle with issues of faith and doubt in an honest and accessible way." At Indie Vision Music, Joshua Clark rated the album four stars, and felt that the "lyrics seem a lot more ambiguous", yet called the release "near-perfect".

At Jesus Freak Hideout, Jen Rose rated the album four-and-a-half stars, and evoked that the album was "one of those rare gems where every track stands out, some pulling you in with a catchy intro or a clever lyric, others surfacing after spending time with the music." Pär Winberg of Melodic.net rated the album four-and-a-half stars, and underscored that "if you also add really good song writing to that – you all understand that you have a killer album", which he concluded with calling it "a fabulous demonstration how good music should sound like." At New Release Tuesday, Kevin Davis rated the album a perfect five stars, and emphasized that the album was "the most catchy and meaningful album [I've] heard this year."

== Accolades ==
In 2010, the album won a Dove Award for Rock/Contemporary Album of the Year at the 41st GMA Dove Awards. The song "Lay 'Em Down" also won Rock/Contemporary Recorded Song of the Year.

== Track listing ==
All tracks are written by Bear and Bo Rinehart.

No.	Title	Producer(s)	Length
1.	"The Outsiders"	Needtobreathe; Jim Scott	4:29
2.	"Valley of Tomorrow"	Needtobreathe; Rick Beato	4:02
3.	"Through Smoke"	Needtobreathe; Beato	3:12
4.	"Lay 'Em Down"	Needtobreathe; Beato	3:11
5.	"What You've Done to Me"	Needtobreathe; Scott	3:21
6.	"Hurricane"	Needtobreathe; Beato	4:07
7.	"These Hard Times"	Needtobreathe; Beato	3:39
8.	"Stones Under Rushing Water" (featuring Sara Watkins of Nickel Creek)	Needtobreathe; Scott	3:24
9.	"Prisoner"	Needtobreathe; Scott	3:15
10.	"Won't Turn Back"	Needtobreathe; John Alagía	3:09
11.	"Girl Named Tennessee"	Needtobreathe; Alagía	2:58
12.	"Something Beautiful"	Needtobreathe; Alagía	3:42
13.	"Garden"	Needtobreathe; Beato	3:41
14.	"Let Us Love"	Needtobreathe; Scott	3:42

Deluxe edition bonus track
No.	Title	Producer(s)	Length
15.	"Said Too Much"	Needtobreathe; Beato	4:20

== Personnel ==
=== Needtobreathe ===
- Bear Rinehart – lead vocals, guitars, acoustic piano, organ, harmonica
- Bo Rinehart – synthesizers, guitars, background vocals
- Seth Bolt – programming, bass guitar, background vocals
- Joe Stillwell – drums, percussion, background vocals

=== Additional musicians ===
- Scotty Wilbanks – acoustic piano, organ (tracks 2, 4)
- Michael Gleason – string arrangements (track 13)
- Carolyn Hancock – strings (track 13)
- David Hancock – strings (track 13)
- Jeanne Johnson – strings (track 13)
- Tania Maxwell Clements – strings (track 13)
- Sandra Benser – background vocals (track 5)
- Casandra Williams – background vocals (track 5)
- Sara Watkins – lead vocals (track 8)

=== Technical ===
- Needtobreathe – production
- Jim Scott – production, engineering (tracks 1, 5, 8, 9, 14), mixing (tracks 1–4, 6, 7, 8, 10, 11, 13, 14)
- Rick Beato – production, engineering (tracks 2, 3, 4, 6, 7, 13)
- John Alagía – production (tracks 10, 11, 12), mixing (tracks 9, 12)
- Seth Bolt – engineering, mixing (track 5)
- Kevin Dean – engineering (tracks 1, 5, 8, 9, 14)
- Ken "Grand" Lanyon – engineering (tracks 2, 3, 4, 6, 7, 13)
- Brian Scheuble – engineering (tracks 10, 11, 12)
- Andy VanDette – mastering at Masterdisk (New York City, New York)
- Anthony Delia – A&R, marketing
- Pete Ganbarg – A&R
- Lesley Melincoff – A&R administration
- Kellan Bailey – marketing
- Kip Krones – management

=== Design ===
- Bo Rinehart – design
- Chris Woehrle – design
- Tec Petaja – photography

== Music videos ==
- "Lay 'Em Down"
- "Hurricane"
- "Something Beautiful"

== Charts ==
Chart (2009)	Peak position
US Billboard 200	20
US Top Alternative Albums (Billboard)	7
US Digital Albums (Billboard)	8
US Top Christian Albums (Billboard)	2
US Top Rock Albums (Billboard)	9

== Certifications ==
Region	Certification	Certified units/sales
United States (RIAA)	Gold	500,000^{^}
^{^} Shipments figures based on certification alone.
