= Caves (album) =

Studio album by Needtobreathe
- Released: September 15, 2023
- Recorded: 2022
- Studio: Pachyderm (Cannon Falls, Minnesota)
- Genres: Pop; Southern rock
- Length: 43:18
- Label: Drive All Night
- Producers: Cason Cooley; Needtobreathe

Needtobreathe chronology
| Into the Mystery (2021) | Caves (2023) | The Long Surrender (2026) |

Singles from Caves
- 1. "Everknown" Released: June 22, 2023; 2. "The Cave" Released: July 20, 2023; 3. "Hideaway" Released: August 10, 2023; 4. "Temporary Tears" Released: August 31, 2023; 5. "Wasting Time" Released: August 31, 2023

Caves (stylized as CAVES) is the ninth studio album from American rock band Needtobreathe. It was released on September 15, 2023, by Drive All Night Records. The album features collaborations with Carly Pearce, Judah & the Lion, Old Dominion, and Foy Vance. It was produced by Cason Cooley and Needtobreathe.

== Background ==
Needtobreathe first announced the album in May 2023. Five singles were subsequently released to precede the album, including "Everknown", "The Cave", "Hideaway", "Temporary Tears", and "Wasting Time". The band retreated to Utah and Minnesota while creating the album. Lead singer Bear Rinehart described the album to American Songwriter as, "It feels like it's a band record" and "Not many people are making band records anymore. We all to have an influence on the record musically and lyrically and it feels like it's all our voices at the same time."

== Composition ==
The album was written in two different phases in 2022. The band wrote the opening title track in a hotel room just using an "acoustic guitar and midi keyboard". "How Wonderful We Are", the third song, is a piano ballad song. The second song, "Everknown", was used in a tribute package for WWE Superstar Bray Wyatt, who had died from a heart attack on August 24, 2023, at 36. It was used in Wyatt's tribute package on the August 25, 2023, episode of SmackDown.

The tenth track "Reaching Out to Find You", is described as a "soaring piano ballad".

== Promotion ==
Coinciding with the album announcement, Needtobreathe announced "The Caves World Tour", to begin in late 2023. The tour will feature Judah & the Lion as a supporting act, and includes stops at arenas throughout the US. A second leg of the tour was announced on the album release day, September 15, 2023. A two-part documentary titled "A World Without a Mirror: The Making of Caves" was released on YouTube, chronicling the album writing and recording process.

== Critical reception ==
Professional ratings
Review scores
| Source | Rating |
|---|---|
| AllMusic | 4/5 stars |
| The Music | 4/5 stars |
| Jesus Freak Hideout | 4/5 stars |

Bryget Chrisfield of The Music gave Caves four stars, and said that the album "is a collection of instantly catchy, life-affirming rock songs for marking pivotal life events." The Christian Beat's Jessie Clarks called Caves, "a collection of awe-inspiring melodies, breathtaking instrumentation and epic-scale energy, giving the band's soul-probing approach a bigger, more expansive new scope."

== Track listing ==
Caves track listing
| No. | Title | Writer(s) | Length |
|---|---|---|---|
| 1. | "The Cave" | Bear Rinehart; John-Luke Carter; Josh Lovelace | 3:36 |
| 2. | "Everknown" | Rinehart; Carter; Lovelace; Tyler Burkum; Chance McCoy; Seth Bolt | 4:24 |
| 3. | "How Wonderful We Are" | Rinehart; Burkum; Carter; Lovelace | 3:56 |
| 4. | "Dreams" (featuring Judah & the Lion) | Rinehart; Carter; Judah Akers | 4:09 |
| 5. | "When You Forgive Someone" | Rinehart; Jason Ingram; Josh Kerr | 3:53 |
| 6. | "Wasting Time" (featuring Old Dominion) | Rinehart; Lovelace; McCoy; Cason Cooley | 4:04 |
| 7. | "Fall on Me" (featuring Carly Pearce) | Rinehart; Ingram; Steven Furtick | 4:24 |
| 8. | "Hideaway" | Rinehart; Carter; Trent Dabbs | 4:13 |
| 9. | "By and By" | Rinehart; Carter; Dabbs | 3:48 |
| 10. | "Reaching Out to Find You" | Rinehart; Dave Barnes; Jordan Reynolds | 3:24 |
| 11. | "Temporary Tears" (featuring Foy Vance) | Rinehart; Dabbs | 3:55 |
| Total length: | | | 43:18 |

== Charts ==
Chart performance for Caves
| Chart (2023) | Peak position |
|---|---|
| US Billboard 200 | 131 |
| US Top Christian Albums (Billboard) | 1 |
| US Independent Albums (Billboard) | 25 |
