= The Heat (Needtobreathe album) =

Studio album by Needtobreathe
- Released: August 28, 2007
- Recorded: Late 2006 – early 2007
- Studios: Plantation Studios, Walhalla, South Carolina; Black Dog Sound, Atlanta; Tree Sound, Atlanta; Rax Trax Recording, Chicago
- Genres: Christian rock, Southern rock
- Length: 52:35
- Labels: Atlantic, Word
- Producers: Ed Roland, Rick Beato, Needtobreathe

Needtobreathe chronology
Daylight (2006)	The Heat (2007)	The Outsiders (2009)

Singles from The Heat
- 1. "Signature of Divine (Yahweh)" Released: 2007; 2. "More Time" Released: 2007; 3. "Washed by the Water" Released: 2007; 4. "Streets of Gold" Released: 2008

The Heat is the second album by the American Christian rock band Needtobreathe, released on August 28, 2007, by Atlantic and Word Records. The album reached No. 164 on Billboard's Top 200 and No. 2 on the Top Heatseekers charts. The first single from the album, "Signature of Divine (Yahweh)", reached No. 1 on R&R's Christian contemporary hit radio chart, and was the fourteenth-most played song in 2007 in that radio format. "Washed by the Water" was the sixth most-played song on R&R magazine's Christian CHR chart for 2008. The Heat was GMA Dove Award-nominated for "Rock/Contemporary Album of the Year", as well as "Rock/Contemporary Song of the Year" for the song "Signature of Divine (Yahweh)".

== Recording ==
The album was recorded over a six-month period of time, from late 2006 to spring 2007. The band recorded the album at the following studios: Seth Bolts' Plantation Studios in Walhalla, South Carolina, Rick Beato's Black Dog Studio in Stone Mountain, Georgia, Ed Roland's Tree Sound Studios in Atlanta, Georgia and Rax Trax Recordings in Chicago, Illinois.

== Release and promotion ==
In late 2007, MTV used "We Could Run Away" in their TV show The Hills. Also, FOX used the song "Nothing Left to Lose" for promotions of their shows Prison Break and K-Ville.

The song "More Time" is featured in the 2007 film P.S. I Love You and its Atlantic Records soundtrack.

The song "Nothing Left to Lose" was featured in the theatrical trailer for the 2009 film "Extraordinary Measures".

At the 39th annual GMA Dove Awards in 2008, The Heat was nominated for "Rock/Contemporary Album of the Year", and "Signature of Divine (Yahweh)" was nominated for "Rock/Contemporary Song of the Year".

On February 8, 2016, "Streets of Gold" was used in the video package for the retirement of American professional wrestler, Daniel Bryan.

== Critical reception ==
Professional ratings
Review scores
Source	Rating
AllMusic	4/5 stars
CCM Magazine	4/5 stars
Christian Broadcasting Network	4/5 stars
Christian Music Review	4/5 stars
Christianity Today	4/5 stars
Cross Rhythms	9/10 squares
Jesus Freak Hideout	4.5/5 stars
Melodic.net	4.5/5 stars 3/5 stars
The Phantom Tollbooth	3.5/5 stars

The Heat received generally positive reviews from music critics. At AllMusic, Jared Johnson rated the album four stars, and suggested that "now that the cat's out of the bag (i.e. their sound no longer commands an aura of mystery and intrigue), the boys seem to have lost just a touch of their pioneering spirit, [but] that cannot distract from the album's strong, approachable rock that plays best when cranked to a '10.'" Chad Bonham of CCM Magazine rated the album four stars, and indicated that the album "allow[s] its deep-seated [sic] faith to seep into a much larger portion of its material", and he affirmed that the album "will appeal to any fans of solid pop-driven rock music that features the rare combination of solid musicianship and lyrical genius." At Christian Broadcasting Network, Jennifer E. Jones rated the album four stars, and felt that "Needtobreathe continues to look at life and contemporary Christian music from new and exciting angles."

At Christian Music Review, Jay Heilman rated the album four stars, and evoked that the release "isn't the most blatant with their message, by their music can easily fit in with just about any genre, whether it be Christian or mainstream. I think fans of rock music in both genres will appreciate what these guys bring to the table and The Heat is a good way to introduce new listeners to what these guys are all about. If you like groups like Dave Matthews Band or perhaps Kings of Leon, I think Needtobreathe would complement your listening experience. Check them out." Founder Tony Cummings of Cross Rhythms rated the album nine squares out of ten, and stated that the release has "the tracks here represent a varied musical feast brim full of lyrical and musical intelligence." At Christianity Today, Christa Banister rated the album four stars, and affirmed that the band have the "ability to communicate these simple truths with creative panache that makes The Heat such a winning effort."

At Jesus Freak Hideout, John DiBiase rated the album four-and-a-half stars, and underscored that the album "offers a little bit of everything". Horacio García Oliveros of Melodic.net rated the album four-and-a-half stars, and hinted at the album being "very introspective and spiritual album, treating subjects like having hope in the darkest moments, relationships, love, and –of course- God", which he noted this album "sounds a lot like Maroon 5, but much better." Lastly, García Oliveros ended "to summarize, do yourself a favor and listen to his album. You won't regret it." Tom Spinelli of Melodic.net rated the album three stars, and criticized the album by stating that "the only negative thing I have for this album is the singer doesn't really do much with his voice making some of the tracks seem repetitive", but he concluded by saying "other than that these songs are really good and these guys know how to write a catchy Christian rock ballad. For fans of Splender, Sanctus Real, Mainstay." At The Phantom Tollbooth, Brian A. Smith rated the album three-and-a-half stars, and called it "another solid effort" that still won't allow the band to extricate themselves "from the frat rock crowd."

== Accolades ==
In 2008, the album was nominated for a Dove Award for Rock/Contemporary Album of the Year at the 39th GMA Dove Awards. The song "Signature of Divine (Yahweh)" was also nominated for Rock/Contemporary Recorded Song of the Year.

== Track listing ==
All tracks are written by Bear and Bo Rinehart.

No.	Title	Producer(s)	Length
1.	"Spare the Time"	Needtobreathe	0:36
2.	"Restless"	Needtobreathe; Rick Beato	3:57
3.	"Again"	Needtobreathe; Beato	3:41
4.	"Return"	Needtobreathe	4:27
5.	"We Could Run Away"	Needtobreathe	4:08
6.	"Streets of Gold"	Needtobreathe; Ed Roland	3:29
7.	"More Time"	Needtobreathe; Beato	4:24
8.	"Signature of Divine (Yahweh)"	Needtobreathe; Beato	4:04
9.	"Looks Like Love"	Needtobreathe; Beato	4:18
10.	"The Heat"	Needtobreathe; Beato	3:52
11.	"Nothing Left to Lose"	Needtobreathe; Roland	4:21
12.	"Movin' On"	Needtobreathe	3:09
13.	"Washed by the Water"	Needtobreathe; Beato	3:28
14.	"Second Chances"	Needtobreathe	4:36
Total length:			52:35

== Personnel ==
Credits for The Heat are adapted from AllMusic.

=== Needtobreathe ===
- Bear Rinehart – lead vocals, guitars, acoustic piano, organ, harmonica
- Bo Rinehart – synthesizers, guitars, background vocals
- Seth Bolt – programming, bass guitar, background vocals
- Joe Stillwell – drums, percussion, background vocals

=== Additional musicians ===
- Anthony J. Resta – Akai MPC3000 programming (track 2); analog synthesizers, atmospheric guitars (tracks 3, 5, 6)
- Will Hunt – programming (tracks 2, 10)
- Aaron Bowen – electric piano (track 10), organ (track 13)
- Jim Gailloreto – saxophone (track 12)
- Tom Garling – trombone (track 12)
- Terry Connell – trumpet (track 12)
- Set Free Christian Fellowship Choir – choir (tracks 11, 13)
- Mark Ward – choir direction (tracks 11, 13)

=== Technical ===
- Needtobreathe – production
- Rick Beato – production, engineering (tracks 2, 3, 7–10, 13)
- Ed Roland – production (tracks 6, 11)
- Seth Bolt – engineering
- Ken "Grand" Laynon – engineering (tracks 2, 3, 7–10, 13)
- Shawn Grove – engineering (tracks 6, 11)
- Rick Barnes – engineering (track 12)
- Richard Chycki – mixing at Mixland Music & DVD (Wasaga Beach, Canada)
- Andy VanDette – mastering at Masterdisk (New York City, New York)
- Andrew Karp – A&R
- Kim Stephens – A&R
- Lesley Melincoff – A&R administration
- Anthony Delia – production manager
- Kip Krones – management

=== Design ===
- Bo Rinehart – design
- John Regan – design
- Jeremy Cowart – cover photography
- Dan Rankin – inside photography

== Music videos ==
- "Signature of Divine (Yahweh)" on YouTube
- "Washed by the Water" on YouTube
