= Washed by the Water =

Single by Needtobreathe

from the album The Heat
- Released: Late 2007
- Genre: Christian rock
- Length: 3:29
- Label: Atlantic; Word
- Songwriters: Bear Rinehart; Bo Rinehart
- Producers: Rick Beato; Needtobreathe

Needtobreathe singles chronology
"More Time" (2007)	"Washed by the Water" (2007)	"Streets of Gold" (2008)

Music video
- "Washed by the Water" on YouTube

"Washed by the Water" is a song recorded by American Christian rock band Needtobreathe for their second studio album The Heat. It was released as a radio single at the end of 2007, becoming a No. 1 hit in the spring of 2008. It was the sixth most-played song on R&R's Christian CHR chart for 2008.

== Background ==
The song was written by the Rinehart brothers about their father who was a pastor. Lead singer Bear Rinehart said, "It's a song about my dad. He's a pastor ... There was some stuff that got said at our church that actually turned out to not be true when it all came out. I just thought it was a cool thing that my dad kept his integrity throughout that whole situation."

== Composition ==
The song is a piano-based rock ballad. It takes influence from a southern style of music and has been labeled as "gospel-tinged".

== Release ==
The song reached No. 1 on R&R's CHR chart at the end of May 2008. By June 6, "Washed by the Water" had stayed at the No. 1 position for three consecutive weeks.

=== Reception ===
The song was generally well received by the music critics. Jesus Freak Hideout editor John DiBiase said that it is "another one of the album's true gems, a piano-driven southern delight ... [It is] new territory that will no doubt spread a smile across the listener's face." Christa Banister of Christianity Today was also positive towards "Washed by the Water", saying that it "[packs] more emotional punch while Bear Rinehart's gravelly vocal rises to the top".

In February 2009, the song won the "Rock/Contemporary Song of the Year" award at the 2009 GMA Dove Awards. The song was also featured as About.com's Christian Music Song of the Week on October 15, 2007; editor Kim Jones labeled it as a "bluesy" and "awesome tune".

== Music video ==
In the week of February 11–16, 2008, a music video was filmed for "Washed by the Water". The video premiered on April 5, 2008, airing on JCTV's monthly Top Ten music video countdown.

== Certifications ==
Region	Certification	Certified units/sales
United States (RIAA)	Gold	500,000^{‡}
^{‡} Sales+streaming figures based on certification alone.
