= Hard Love (album) =

Studio album by Needtobreathe
- Released: July 15, 2016
- Studios: Plantation Studios, Charleston, South Carolina; Night Fox Studio, New York City; Germano Studios, New York City
- Genres: Alternative rock; Christian rock; Southern rock; country rock; pop rock
- Length: 40:14
- Label: Atlantic
- Producers: Dave Tozer; Ed Cash; Ido Zmishlany; Jon Levine; Needtobreathe

Needtobreathe chronology
| Live from the Woods at Fontanel (2015) | Hard Love (2016) | Forever on Your Side (Niles City Sound Sessions) [EP] (2018) |

Hard Love (styled H A R D L O V E) is the sixth studio album by American Christian rock band Needtobreathe, released on July 15, 2016, through Atlantic Records. The album yielded three singles: "Happiness", "Testify", and "Great Night".

== Background and recording ==
Hard Love was produced by Dave Tozer, Ed Cash, Ido Zmishlany, Jon Levine, and co-produced by the band. The album was recorded at Plantation Studios in Charleston, South Carolina, Night Fox Studio and Germano Studios in New York, NY.

== Promotion ==
In support of the album, the band went on a "Tour De Compadres 2016" that began on August 17, 2016, and concluded on November 12, 2016. The tour included 53 stops across the United States.

== Reception ==
=== Critical reception ===
Professional ratings
Review scores
| Source | Rating |
|---|---|
| AllMusic | 4/5 stars |
| Jesus Freak Hideout | 3.5/5 stars |
| Music-News.com | 4/5 stars |
| The Musical Melting Pot | 92% |
| Substream Magazine | 4.5/5 stars |
| TheChristianBeat.org | 4.4/5 |

Hard Love received mostly positive reviews from music critics. AllMusic's Neil Z. Yeung rated the album four out of five stars and calls it "cleverly crafted praise music." Chris Major of TheChristianBeat.org rated the album 4.4 out of 5 and writes, "(the album) packs both energy and encouragement into its forty minute runtime. With diverse sounds and deep thought poured into each song, Needtobreathe does not hold back has outdone itself once again. Hard Love is easily worth a full listen-through from both fans and new audiences." Jesus Freak Hideout's Christopher Smith rated the album three and a half stars out of five and calls it "a solid record."

=== Commercial performance ===
Hard Love debuted at No. 1 on the Top Album Sales chart and at No. 2 on the US Billboard 200, moving 50,000 equivalent album units in its first week of release, of which 46,000 were in traditional album sales. This is the band's highest charting album to date, besting the No. 3 Billboard 200 debut of their 2014 release Rivers in the Wasteland.

== Awards and accolades ==
On August 9, 2017, it was announced that Hard Love would be nominated for a GMA Dove Award in the Rock/Contemporary Album of the Year category at the 48th Annual GMA Dove Awards.

On October 17, 2017, Hard Love won the GMA Dove Award for Rock/Contemporary Album of the Year with Kari Jobe alongside art producers Dave Tozer, Ed Cash, Ido Zmishlany and Jon Levine being the receipts at a ceremony at Allen Arena in Nashville, Tennessee.

== Track listing ==
All tracks are written by Bear and Bo Rinehart, except where noted.

Standard edition
| No. | Title | Writer(s) | Producer(s) | Length |
|---|---|---|---|---|
| 1. | "Mountain, Pt. 1" | | Needtobreathe | 0:56 |
| 2. | "Hard Love" | | Needtobreathe; Jon Levine | 3:34 |
| 3. | "Money & Fame" | Rinehart; Rinehart; Dave Tozer | Needtobreathe; Tozer | 3:12 |
| 4. | "No Excuses" | | Needtobreathe; Tozer | 2:45 |
| 5. | "When I Sing" | Rinehart; Rinehart; Ed Cash; Ido Zmishlany | Needtobreathe; Cash; Levine | 2:42 |
| 6. | "Happiness" | Rinehart; Rinehart; Whitney Phillips; Zmishlany | Zmishlany | 3:25 |
| 7. | "Great Night" (featuring Shovels & Rope) | Rinehart; Rinehart; Tozer | Needtobreathe; Tozer | 2:55 |
| 8. | "Be Here Long" | | Needtobreathe | 3:35 |
| 9. | "Don't Bring That Trouble" | | Needtobreathe | 2:56 |
| 10. | "Let's Stay Home Tonight" | Rinehart; Rinehart; Luke Laird | Needtobreathe; Tozer | 3:20 |
| 11. | "Testify" | | Needtobreathe; Cash | 4:03 |
| 12. | "Clear" | | Needtobreathe; Cash | 6:51 |
| Total length: | | | | 40:14 |

Cracker Barrel bonus tracks
| No. | Title | Writer(s) | Length |
|---|---|---|---|
| 13. | "When I Sing" (Mountain House version) | Rinehart; Rinehart; Cash; Zmishlany | 2:42 |
| 14. | "Let's Stay Home Tonight" (original demo) | Rinehart; Rinehart; Laird | 3:32 |

== Personnel ==
Credits for Hard Love are adapted from official liner notes.

=== Needtobreathe ===
- Bear Rinehart – lead vocals, synthesizers, guitars, slide guitar, ukulele
- Bo Rinehart – synthesizers, programming, guitars, mandola, background vocals
- Seth Bolt – synthesizers, bass guitar, drum programming, percussion, background vocals
- Josh Lovelace – acoustic piano, organ, synthesizers, background vocals

=== Additional musicians ===
- Jon Levine – additional keyboards (2), drum programming (2)
- Dave Tozer – acoustic piano (3), organ (3, 4, 7), programming (3, 7), guitars (3, 4, 10), bass guitar (3), handclaps (3, 4), synthesizers (4, 10), drum programming (4, 10), tambourine (4), finger snaps (4), foot stomping (4), background vocals (7), synth bass (10)
- Chris Connors – programming (3), synthesizers (4, 10), drum programming (4, 10), organ (10)
- Rodrick Simmons – organ (5), keyboards (6)
- Ido Zmishlany – keyboards (6), programming (6), guitars (6), background vocals (6)
- Roger Cliche – organ (6)
- Sam Getz – guitars (7), additional guitars (9)
- John Murchison – upright bass (4)
- Pete Donnelly – bass (7)
- Dylan Wissing – drums (3, 7)
- Will Chapman – drums (8), programming (8)
- Colin Callahan – handclaps (3)
- Matt Schenck – handclaps (3)
- Tomás Shannon – handclaps (3)
- Randall Harris – handclaps (4), finger snaps (4), foot stomping (4)
- Hayden Lamb – handclaps (7), background vocals (7)
- Simon Harding – saxophone (2, 3), saxophone solo (3)
- Steve Tirpak – trombone (3), trumpet (3)
- Chuck Dalton – trumpet (2, 3)
- Clayton Bryant – background vocals (3, 4, 10)
- Carla Kelly – background vocals (3, 10)
- Carmen Roman – background vocals (3, 10)
- Darnell White – background vocals (3, 4)
- Michael Trent – additional vocals (7)
- Cary Ann Hearst – additional vocals (7)
- Randall Harris – background vocals (7), drums (9)
- Ebony Johnson – background vocals (10)

=== Technical ===
- Seth Bolt – engineering (1–5, 7–12), additional engineering (6)
- Bo Rinehart – engineering (2, 11, 12)
- Chris Connors – engineering (3, 4, 7, 10)
- Dave Tozer – engineering (3, 4, 7, 10)
- Ido Zmishlany – engineering (6)
- Ed Cash – engineering (11, 12)
- Randall Harris – engineering assistance (1–5, 7, 8, 10)
- Matt Schenck – engineering assistance (3, 7, 10)
- Mikey Reaves – engineering assistance (4, 5, 10), additional vocal production (2)
- Michael Trent – additional engineering (7)
- Robert Orton – mixing
- Dave Kutch – mastering at The Mastering Place (New York, NY)
- Pete Ganbarg – A&R
- Steve Bursky – management

=== Design ===
- Eric Hurtgen – creative direction, cover design
- Bo Rinehart – creative direction, cover design
- Joshua Drake – cover photography
- Eric Ryan Anderson – additional photography

== Charts ==
=== Weekly charts ===
Weekly chart performance for Hard Love
| Chart (2016) | Peak position |
|---|---|
| Australian Albums (ARIA) | 46 |
| Canadian Albums (Billboard) | 11 |
| New Zealand Heatseekers Albums (RMNZ) | 6 |
| Scottish Albums (Official Charts) | 56 |
| Swiss Albums (Schweizer Hitparade) | 50 |
| UK Albums (Official Charts) | 159 |
| US Billboard 200 | 2 |
| US Top Christian Albums (Billboard) | 1 |
| US Top Alternative Albums (Billboard) | 1 |
| US Top Rock Albums (Billboard) | 1 |
| US Vinyl Albums (Billboard) | 3 |

=== Year-end charts ===
2016 year-end chart performance for Hard Love
| Chart (2016) | Peak position |
|---|---|
| US Top Alternative Albums (Billboard) | 27 |
| US Top Christian Albums (Billboard) | 10 |
| US Top Rock Albums (Billboard) | 38 |

2017 year-end chart performance for Hard Love
| Chart (2017) | Peak position |
|---|---|
| US Top Christian Albums (Billboard) | 18 |

2018 year-end chart performance for Hard Love
| Chart (2018) | Peak position |
|---|---|
| US Top Christian Albums (Billboard) | 30 |

2019 year-end chart performance for Hard Love
| Chart (2019) | Peak position |
|---|---|
| US Top Christian Albums (Billboard) | 48 |

== Release history ==
| Region | Date | Format(s) | Label |
|---|---|---|---|
| United States | July 15, 2016 | CD; LP; digital download; streaming | Atlantic |
