= Needtobreathe =

American rock band

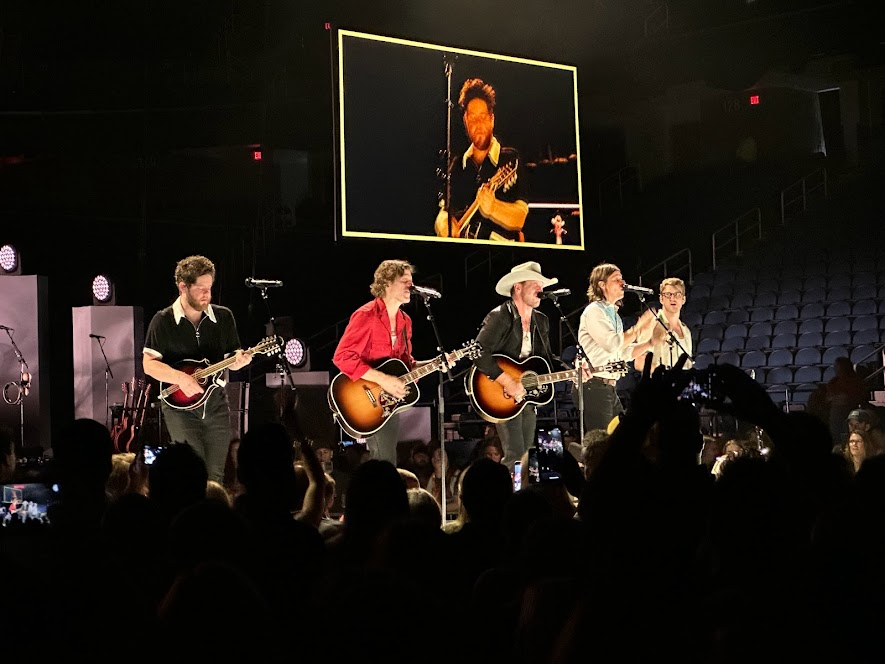
- Needtobreathe performing in 2023

Background information
- Origin: Seneca, South Carolina, U.S.
- Genres: Alternative rock; Southern rock; Christian rock; Country rock
- Years active: 2001–present
- Labels: Lava; Atlantic; Sparrow; Word; Elektra; Universal
- Members: Bear Rinehart; Josh Lovelace; Randall Harris; Tyler Burkum
- Past members: Seth Bolt; Joe Stillwell; Bo Rinehart
- Website: needtobreathe.com

Needtobreathe (stylized as NEEDTOBREATHE) is an American rock band from Seneca, South Carolina. The group first gained fame for their Christian themes, eventually reaching crossover success. The band is composed of Bear Rinehart (lead vocals, guitar, piano), Josh Lovelace (backing vocals, keys), Randall Harris (drums, percussion) and Tyler Burkum (guitar). To date, the band has released eleven studio albums: The Feature (2001), Daylight (2006), The Heat (2007), The Outsiders (2009), The Reckoning (2011), Rivers in the Wasteland (2014), Hard Love (2016), Out of Body (2020), Into the Mystery (2021), Caves (2023) and The Long Surrender (2026); six of those albums have reached No. 1 on the Christian Albums chart. The band has also charted with a number of singles, including "Washed by the Water" (2007), which reached No. 1 on the Hot Christian Songs chart; the Grammy-nominated "Multiplied" (2014); "Brother" (2015), which charted on the Top 100 and reached No. 1 on the Hot Christian Songs chart; and "Who Am I" (2020), which reached No. 14 on the Hot Alternative Songs chart.

== History ==
=== Beginnings (1998–2006) ===
Brothers William Stanley "Bear" Rinehart III and Nathaniel Bryant "Bo" Rinehart were raised in Possum Kingdom, South Carolina. The brothers started performing in Seneca after moving there. The Rinehart brothers grew up attending a church camp that their father, who was a pastor, ran. The brothers first performed in front of coffee house audiences at Furman University, where Bear, who was named after University of Alabama football coach Bear Bryant, was a wide receiver for the Furman Paladins football team, winning the 2002 Banks McFadden trophy for South Carolina football player of the year. After graduation, Bear, Bo and Joe Stillwell joined with Seth Bolt, producing independent releases that were recorded in Bolt's Plantation Studios.

Needtobreathe was formed in 1998. The name of the band is based on a Greek demonstrative parable of Socrates about seeking direction in life, and Bear Rinehart indicated that it was better than other names that the band had at the time.

In 2001, the band independently released their first album, The Feature. In 2003, they released a three-song EP, Soulrock Review. In 2004, it's followed with two four-song EPs, Fire and Turnaround. These brought the band to the attention of Lava Records, owned by Universal Music Group, who signed the band in 2005.

After signing with both Atlantic Records and Sparrow Records, the band went to the UK to record their first full-length studio album, Daylight, with producer Andy Green. Its first radio single "You Are Here", previously released on the Fire EP in 2004, was released early in 2006. Just prior to their debut release, the band was featured on the cover of CCM Magazine—an unprecedented new artist endorsement by the national publication. Daylight was released on April 4, 2006.

=== The Heat (2006–2008) ===
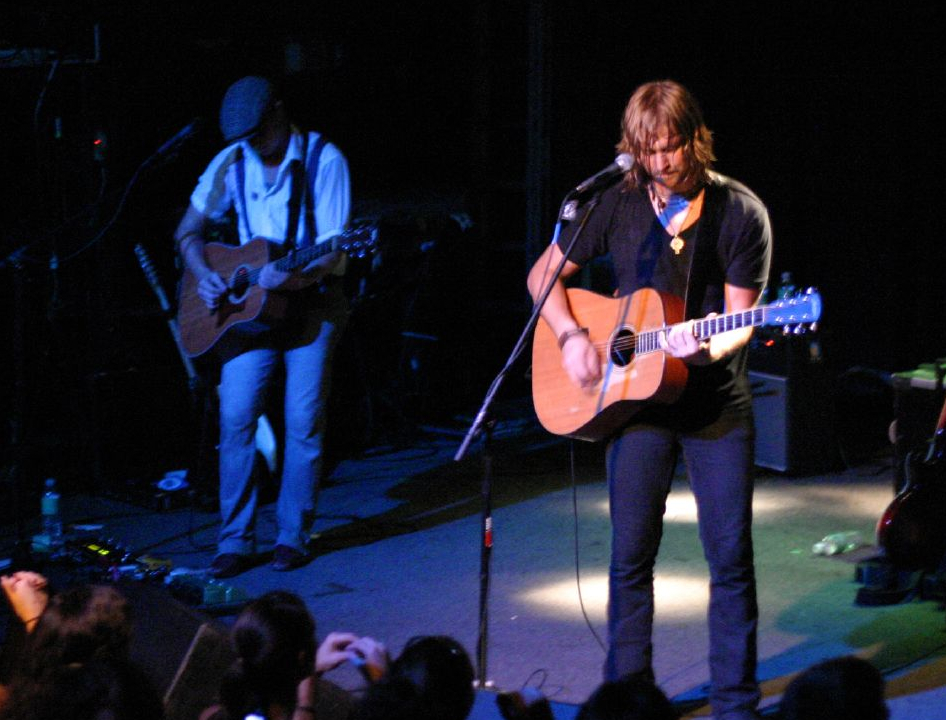
Brothers Bo and Bear Rinehart in September 2007

Needtobreathe started pre-production for their second studio album The Heat in late 2006. In 2007, the band started a six-month recording period at producer Rick Beato's Black Dog Studio and at Paul Diaz's Tree Sounds in Atlanta. The Heat was released on August 28, 2007, through Atlantic Records and Word Entertainment.

In 2008, the band was nominated for two Dove Awards at the 39th GMA Dove Awards. Their song "Signature of Divine (Yahweh)" received a nomination for "Rock/Contemporary Recorded Song of the Year", and The Heat was nominated for "Rock/Contemporary Album of the Year". In 2009, their song "Washed by the Water" was nominated and won the Dove Award for "Rock/Contemporary Song of the Year". Marisa Brown, writing at AllMusic and Billboard, has referenced this album in helping to "establish the band as one of Christian rock's most successful newcomers."

=== The Outsiders and The Reckoning (2009–2013) ===
The band's third album, The Outsiders was released on August 25, 2009, peaking at No. 20 on the Billboard 200 and No. 2 on the Hot Christian Albums. The first single for the album, "Lay 'Em Down", peaked at No. 4 on the Hot Christian Songs chart. The single "Something Beautiful" peaked at No. 12 on the Triple A chart and No. 6 on the Hot Christian Songs chart. "Hurricane" peaked at No. 29 on the Alternative chart, their first success at Alternative radio. The title song of the album, "The Outsiders", peaked at No. 11 on the Triple A chart.

The album The Reckoning was released on September 20, 2011, peaking at No. 6 on the Billboard 200. "Slumber" was the album's first single and peaked at No. 26 on the Christian rock charts while "Drive All Night" is the album's second single. The band went on tour with Taylor Swift as a featuring opening act on her Speak Now World Tour in 2011.

On December 17, 2013, Eric Ryan Anderson released his film Prove the Poets Wrong, chronicling the band's 2013 tours and revisiting their origins, on YouTube.

=== Rivers in the Wasteland (2014–2015) ===
Rivers in the Wasteland was released on April 15, 2014, debuting at No. 3 on the Billboard 200, No. 1 on the Christian Albums chart, No. 1 Rock Album, and No. 6 on the Canadian Albums Chart, and selling 49,000 copies in its first week. Originally set to be titled "Wasteland", the album takes its name from Isaiah 43:19. It is the first album since drum player Joe Stillwell left the band and the first album with Randall Harris as the drum player.

In 2014, longstanding conflict between Bear and Bo Rinehart escalated into a fistfight that sent one of the brothers to the hospital. Following this altercation, the brothers apologized to each other and reaffirmed that their relationship was more important than music.

In 2015, the band toured Australia with Third Day, before headlining their first North American tour across 40+ cities, touring with Ben Rector (leg 1), Switchfoot (leg 2), Drew Holcomb and the Neighbors, and Colony House.

=== Hard Love (2016–2019) ===
On April 1, 2016, the band announced their sixth studio album, Hard Love, and its release date of July 15, 2016. Additionally, dates for the band's 2016 tour, Tour De Compadres, were announced and the album's lead single, "Happiness", was released along with another single, "Money & Fame". Hard Love debuted at No. 1 on the Top Album Sales chart and at No. 2 on the Billboard 200 with 50,000 units sold, of which 46,000 were in traditional album sales, becoming the band's highest-charting album.

In January 2017, they opened the Needtobreathe OneWorld Health Center in Tola, Nicaragua. The Center is located in an impoverished region. According to Forbes, the Center is completely funded by the band's "touring donations supported by ticket sales, their annual golf tournament and auction", and donations from fans.

Through April 20–22, 2017, they were the opening act for Faith Hill and Tim McGraw on their Soul2Soul The World Tour 2017. On August 11, the band released a deluxe edition of Hard Love featuring unreleased recordings of "Cages", "Count on Me", and "Waiting".

=== Out of Body and Into the Mystery (2020–2022) ===
It was announced, on April 21, 2020, that Bo Rinehart was leaving the band.

The band formally introduced their seventh studio album, Out of Body, on June 11, 2020. Released on August 28, 2020, Out of Body is the first album without influential cofounding member Bo Rinehart, the first album with Tyler Burkum replacing Bo, and also the band's first release under Elektra Records. Prior to the release of the album, the band released five singles: "Seasons", "Hang On", "Survival" (featuring Drew & Ellie Holcomb), "Who Am I", and "Banks". Amid the COVID-19 pandemic, the band pushed the tentative "Out of Body Experience Tour 2020" to 2021. As an alternative to the live tour, the band hosted "Celebrating Out of Body", a ticketed livestream concert on the day of the album's release. Another version of "Who Am I" was released on October 14, 2020, featuring singer-songwriter Elle King.

Following a series of cryptic hints posted to social media, the band revealed on April 26, 2021, that while they would normally have been touring Out of Body, the band had lived together and recorded studio album Into the Mystery over a period of 21 days. The band released their eighth studio album, Into the Mystery on July 30, 2021. Artists featured on the album include Jon Foreman of Switchfoot, Natalie Hemby, and Carrie Underwood. Into the Mystery reached No. 1 on Billboard's Top Christian Albums chart, marking the band's fifth No. 1 album on this chart. A film chronicling the album's recording process was released on November 3, 2021, for a one-night-only event in US theaters.

=== Caves (2023–2025) ===
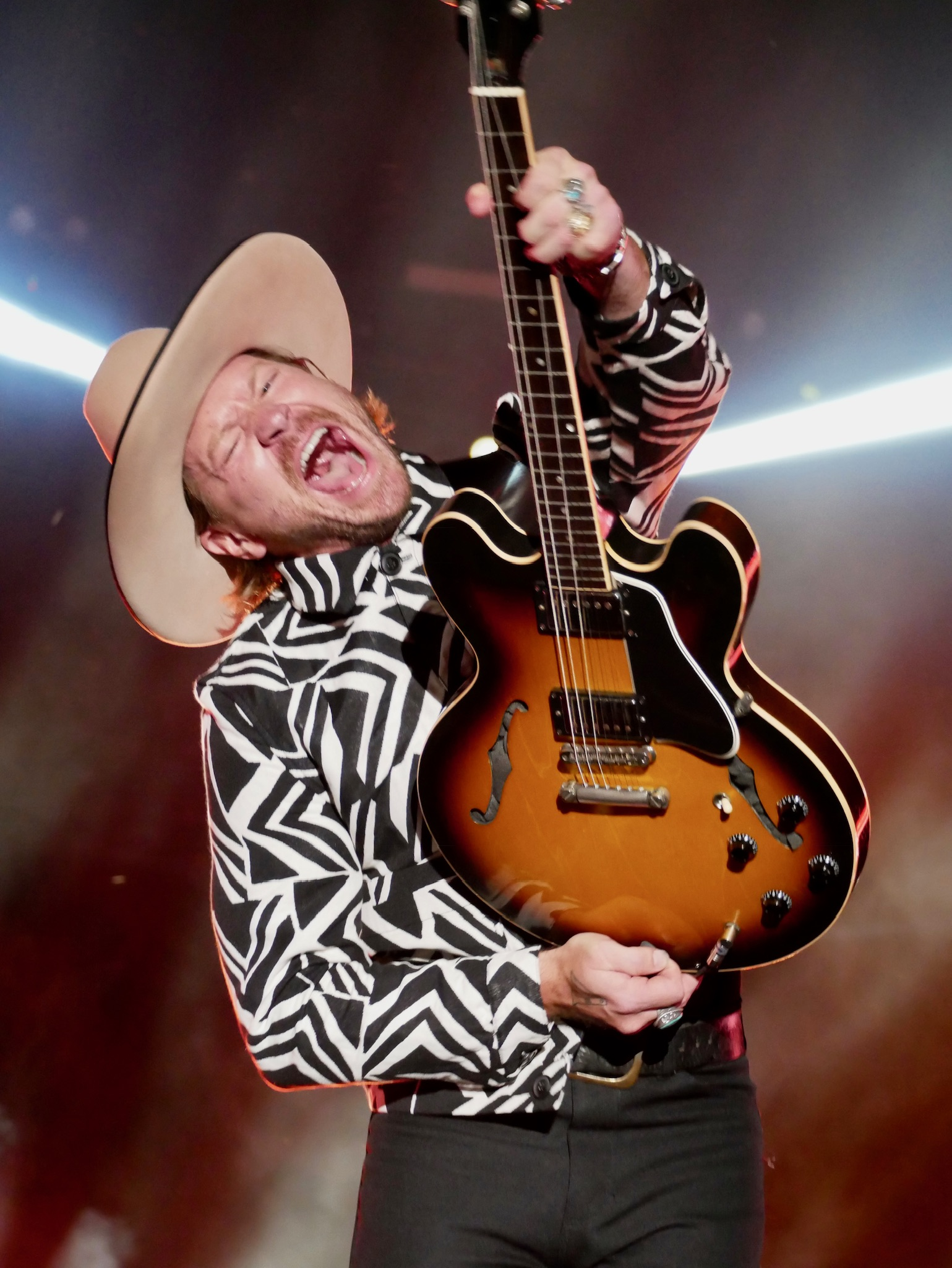
Needtobreathe performs for 7000+ at Alive Music Festival, Mineral City, OH.

In May 2023, the band announced their tenth studio album, Caves. It was released on September 15, 2023. Caves features collaborations with artists such as Carly Pearce, Judah & the Lion, Old Dominion, and Foy Vance. On October 12, 2023, the band released an acoustic version of "Dreams", as well as a remix of the same song with Madism. On November 16, 2023, the band released a second version of "Fall On Me" featuring Maverick City Music. The following month, a new version of "Hideaway" debuted in which the band collaborated with Mokita.

On December 31, 2023, Needtobreathe released the non-album single "I Don't Wanna Worry".

On May 13, 2025, longtime member Seth Bolt announced his departure from the band.

On September 5, 2025, the band released "Momma Loves Me" featuring The Red Clay Strays.

=== The Long Surrender (2026-present) ===
Needtobreathe released their tenth studio album, The Long Surrender, on March 27, 2026, through MCA Nashville and Drive All Night Records. Produced by Dave Cobb and the band, the album was preceded by the singles "Momma Loves Me", "Where You Call Home", "The Long Surrender", and "Highlands".

== Categorization ==
Needtobreathe self-identifies as a rock band, but is often categorized as a Christian rock band as well. The band has been signed to mainstream labels, formerly to Atlantic Records, and has released their latest record under the Elektra Records label. The band experiences success on contemporary hit radio stations, Christian adult contemporary stations, and at the Gospel Music Association Dove Awards, despite releasing a number of songs with no direct mention of their Christian faith. The band has also toured with artists outside of the Christian rock genre, including Train, Taylor Swift, and Tim McGraw.

The band has resisted such specific labels in the past, explaining to Rolling Stone in 2016 in the following statement, "any label is limiting. That one in particular is especially limiting. To me, I think people pass over the band all the time because they read that....I hate the idea that they somehow feel like I didn't make the music for them, that we didn't play music for everyone. Christian record deals came and we said no to all of them. Waited a couple years until the right record deal came, which was Atlantic, which we've been on ever since. But we just said to them in passing when we first started, we want the records to be available to everyone."

== Band members ==
Current members

- William Stanley "Bear" Rinehart III (2001–present) (born September 6, 1980, in Greenville, South Carolina) – lead vocals, rhythm guitar, piano, organ, harmonica
- Josh Lovelace (2011–present) – keyboards, Hammond organ, piano, mandolin, background vocals
- Randall Harris (2012–present) – drums
- Tyler Burkum (2020–present) – lead guitar, banjo, background vocals

Former members

- Joe Stillwell (2001–2012) – drums
- Nathaniel Bryant "Bo" Rinehart (2001–2020) (born December 31, 1981, in Conway, South Carolina) – lead guitar, banjo, mandolin, background vocals
- Seth M. Bolt (2001–2025) (born December 22, 1983) – bass guitar, mandolin, percussion, drums, background vocals

Former touring musicians

- David Leonard (formerly of Jackson Waters and All Sons & Daughters) – keyboards

== Discography ==
- The Feature (independent demo) (2001)
- Daylight (2006)
- The Heat (2007)
- The Outsiders (2009)
- The Reckoning (2011)
- Rivers in the Wasteland (2014)
- Hard Love (2016)
- Out of Body (2020)
- Into the Mystery (2021)
- Caves (2023)
- The Long Surrender (2026)

== Awards and nominations ==
=== GMA Dove Awards ===
Year	Award	Title	Result
2008	Rock/Contemporary Recorded Song of the Year	"Signature of Divine (Yahweh)"	Nominated
2008	Rock/Contemporary Album of the Year	The Heat	Nominated
2009	Rock/Contemporary Recorded Song of the Year	"Washed by the Water"	Won
2010	Group of the Year		Won
2010	Rock/Contemporary Recorded Song of the Year	"Lay 'Em Down"	Won
2010	Rock/Contemporary Album of the Year	The Outsiders	Won
2011	Group of the Year		Won
2011	Rock/Contemporary Recorded Song of the Year	"Something Beautiful"	Won
2012	Group of the Year		Won
2012	Rock/Contemporary Recorded Song of the Year	"Slumber"	Won
2012	Rock/Contemporary Album of the Year	The Reckoning	Won
2013	Short Form Video	"Keep Your Eyes Open"	Nominated
2013	Rock/Contemporary Recorded Song of the Year	"Keep Your Eyes Open"	Won
2016	Song of the Year	"Brother"	Nominated
2017	Contemporary Christian Artist of the Year		Nominated
2017	Rock/Contemporary Recorded Song of the Year	"Hard Love" (featuring Lauren Daigle)	Won
2017	Rock/Contemporary Album of the Year	Hard Love	Won
2017	Recorded Music Packaging of the Year	Hard Love	Nominated
2018	Artist of the Year		Nominated
2018	Rock/Contemporary Recorded Song of the Year	"Walking on Water"	Won
2019	Rock/Contemporary Recorded Song of the Year	"Forever On Your Side" (featuring Johnnyswim)	Nominated
2019	Rock/Contemporary Album of the Year	Acoustic Live, Vol. 1	Nominated
2021	Rock/Contemporary Recorded Song of the Year	"Who Am I"	Won
2021	Rock/Contemporary Album of the Year	Out of Body	Won

=== Grammy Awards ===
Year	Award	Result
2015	Best Contemporary Christian Music Performance/Song ("Multiplied")	Nominated

=== Billboard Music Awards ===
Year	Award	Result
2015	Top Christian Album ("Rivers in the Wasteland")	Nominated
