= The Reckoning (Needtobreathe album) =

Studio album by Needtobreathe
- Released: September 20, 2011
- Recorded: 2010–11
- Studios: Plantation Studios, Charleston; Blackbird Studios, Nashville; Rocket Carousel Studios, Los Angeles
- Genres: Alternative rock; Christian rock; Southern rock
- Length: 55:30
- Label: Atlantic
- Producers: Greg Wells; Rick Beato; Needtobreathe

Needtobreathe chronology
The Outsiders (2009)	The Reckoning (2011)	Rivers in the Wasteland (2014)

Singles from The Reckoning
- 1. "Slumber" Released: June 21, 2011; 2. "Drive All Night" Released: July 26, 2011; 3. "The Reckoning" Released: September 20, 2011; 4. "A Place Only You Can Go" Released: September 27, 2011; 5. "Able" Released: January 31, 2012; 6. "Keep Your Eyes Open" Released: February 14, 2012; 7. "White Fences" Released: February 20, 2012

The Reckoning is the fourth studio album by American Christian rock band Needtobreathe, released on September 20, 2011, through Atlantic Records. It is the last album featuring drummer Joe Stillwell. It debuted at No. 1 on the Billboard Christian Album chart, No. 1 on the Billboard Rock Albums chart, No. 4 on the Billboard Digital Albums chart and No. 6 on the Billboard 200 chart, selling 49,000 copies in its first week. The song "Oohs and Ahhs" was used in a promotional advertisement for J. J. Abrams's drama television series Alcatraz.

== Background ==
The album released on September 20, 2011, through Atlantic Records, and it was produced by Greg Wells, Rick Beato, and Needtobreathe themselves. This was the fourth studio album by the band. The studios used while recording the album were Plantation Studios in Charleston, South Carolina, Blackbird Studios in Nashville, Tennessee and Rocket Carousel Studios in Los Angeles, California.

=== Music and lyrics ===
At Allmusic, Andrew Leahey stated that the album was a mixture of "sacred/secular" that is done with great precision, which takes the "best from both camps." Cross Rhythms' John Willoughby agrees with that noting the band "successfully managed the balancing act of having a foot in both the mainstream and Christian rock worlds." Matt Conner of CCM Magazine wrote that this was an album that "the sweet Southern Rock...captures the attention of all who hear it." At Christian Music Zine, Adrian Garza affirmed that listeners "enjoy music that sounds completely original, and unlike most of what they’ve ever heard", which the band do on the release. Jeremy V. Jones of Christianity Today said that the band has come "out guitars blazing on its fourth album, a muscular collection ready to shake arenas but paint their corners with warm southern and Americana gentility". Willoughby also believed strongly that this is the reason for the band's "huge appeal comes from the fact that they also straddle musical styles and can switch from tender alt-folk to swaggering pop rock."

Jen Rose of Jesus Freak Hideout noted that the album "doesn't retread past material or stick to a formula", however, she stated that "something feels a little off on the first listen or two. Perhaps it's the darker, subdued feel overall that is unsettling at first, or maybe it's the lack of standout upbeat songs". In addition, Jesus Freak Hideout's Jerold Wallace agreed that this album was just not "retreading" the same stuff all over again, but does have "Like the past albums, each piece borrows heavily from southern influences with a firm rock foundation." Also, Wallace noted how "Bear consistently impresses, be it with emotional highs that evolve into growls or a falsetto that we have not heard much of before." This was why Louder Than the Music's Jono Davies noted this album was "creative indie rock at its best." At Rock News and Reviews, Alexandre Romero said the album was "a balanced mix between genres already experienced during their career performed better than ever, plus some innovation touches."

Leahey noted that the album sound like "14 tracks are full of Bible allusions and parable-like lyrics." The Christian Manifesto's Lydia Akinola subscribed to the belief that this album "reads like a series of intimate thoughts put to poetry. More than the music, powerful lines hold the album together." In the thematic area, Akinola said that the album has "running theme[s] of redemption and grace that permeates" every part of the music.

== Critical reception ==
Professional ratings
Review scores
Source	Rating
AllMusic	4/5 stars
CCM Magazine	4/5 stars
The Christian Manifesto	4.5/5 stars
Christian Music Zine	4/5 stars
Christianity Today	4/5 stars
Cross Rhythms	9/10 squares
Jesus Freak Hideout	4/5 stars 4.5/5 stars
Louder Than the Music	5/5 stars
Melodic	4/5 stars
New Release Tuesday	5/5 stars
Rock News and Reviews	4.5/5 stars

The Reckoning received widespread acclaim from music critics. Leahey of Allmusic rated the album four stars, and noted that the album is full of "big music" that the band "have the balls and brawn to pull it off well." At CCM Magazine, Conner rated the album four stars, and stated that the album "offers proof positive that this South Carolina train isn't slowing anytime soon." The Christian Manifesto's Akinola rated the album four-and-a-half stars, and highlighted that the band have "pulled out all the stops – with magnificent results. It is hard not to be impressed, even when really; you weren’t expecting not to be." Garza of Christian Music Zine rated the album four stars, and brought up the "it" factor, which he said no one exactly knows what that is, "but what I do know is that this record has loads of good songs, and is one of the closest to “it” that I’ve heard in a while."

At Christianity Today, Jeremy V. Jones rated the album four stars, and said the band has "got swagger" but are humble at the same time. Cross Rhythms' John Willoughby rated the album nine squares out of ten, and called the album "A fine set." At Jesus Freak Hideout, Jen Rose rated the album four stars, and stated that the release was "a strong album" full of "intriguing, solid addition[s] to the catalog, even if it doesn't quite have the immediate spark of some of their past work...but for now, it is one worth the time to fully discover, whether as a newcomer or long-time listener." Jesus Freak Hideout's Wallace rated the album four-and-a-half stars, and advised "it may take some listeners a few spins before it settles in, but once it does it's arguably Needtobreathe's finest work to date", which adds "14 more solid entries into their catalog." At Louder Than The Music, Jono Davies rated the album a perfect five stars, and touted the music as "a creative set of songs, showing the world that indie rock can be at times dark, rocky and truthfully honest, but put that with great harmonies, interesting chord structures and savvy musicianship and you get a stunning set of songs for a very sturdy album."

Melodic's Johan Wippsson rated the album four stars, and reasoned that the album was "almost in the same class [as The Outsiders] and to me also surprisingly well. Did not think the band would be able to follow up on "The Outsiders", but this is a very well-written album with a great deal of heart and soul." At New Release Tuesday, Kevin Davis rated the album a perfect five stars, and lauded the band for crafting a "ridiculously fantastic album on all levels. You can be sure this is a 5 star masterpiece that will propel NEEDTOBREATHE to major headliner status just like GRAMMY Award winning bands Train, Kings of Leon and Muse." Kevin McNeese also of New Release Tuesday's rated it the same, and noted the album had a tremendous amount of "passion in these songs is something very much akin to what has been driving [him] to Switchfoot as of late", and he got "absolutely engrossed by this album, and the more [he] unearthed, the more [he] discovered." Rock News and Reviews's Alexandre Romero rated the album four-and-a-half stars, and said of the album that it satisfied the "requests of older fans and returns triumphantly to their roots, but without getting away from the softer sound that pushed them to mainstream in recent years.", and the album was absolutely "An important step to the group towards [getting] critical and commercial acclaim"

== Track listing ==
=== Original release ===
All tracks are written by Bear and Bo Rinehart.

The Reckoning
No.	Title	Length
1.	"Oohs and Ahhs"	4:37
2.	"White Fences"	3:45
3.	"Drive All Night"	4:13
4.	"A Place Only You Can Go"	3:12
5.	"Slumber"	3:35
6.	"The Reckoning"	3:44
7.	"Able"	4:21
8.	"Maybe They're On to Us"	3:10
9.	"Wanted Man"	4:06
10.	"Keep Your Eyes Open"	4:10
11.	"Tyrant Kings"	4:09
12.	"Devil's Been Talkin'"	3:35
13.	"Angel at My Door"	4:32
14.	"Learn to Love"	4:21

Vinyl edition — Side one
No.	Title	Length
1.	"Oohs and Ahhs"	4:37
2.	"White Fences"	3:45
3.	"Drive All Night"	4:13
4.	"A Place Only You Can Go"	3:12

Vinyl edition — Side two
No.	Title	Length
5.	"Cops" (Vinyl Exclusive Bonus Track)	2:43
6.	"Slumber"	3:35
7.	"The Reckoning"	3:44
8.	"Able"	4:21

Vinyl edition — Side three
No.	Title	Length
1.	"Maybe They're On to Us"	3:10
2.	"Wanted Man"	4:06
3.	"Keep Your Eyes Open"	4:10
4.	"Tyrant Kings"	4:09

Vinyl edition — Side four
No.	Title	Length
5.	"Disaster Road" (Vinyl Exclusive Bonus Track)	3:53
6.	"Devil's Been Talkin'"	3:35
7.	"Angel at My Door"	4:32
8.	"Learn to Love"	4:21

Notes

- "Cops" and "Disaster Road" included on limited edition vinyl record.
- Currently, the vinyl records are only for sale at the band's concerts.
- The vinyl records are white.
- The parenthesis are what the band called each one of the sides.

=== Keep Your Eyes Open EP ===
All tracks are written by Bear and Bo Rinehart.

Keep Your Eyes Open (Songs from the Reckoning Sessions)
No.	Title	Length
1.	"Keep Your Eyes Open"	4:10
2.	"Keep Your Eyes Open" (acoustic version)	4:05
3.	"Cops" (B-side)	2:43
4.	"Disaster Road" (B-side)	4:31
5.	"Solomon's Ashes" (B-side)	3:21

== Personnel ==
=== Needtobreathe ===
- Bear Rinehart
- Bo Rinehart
- Seth Bolt
- Joe Stillwell

=== Technical ===
- Needtobreathe – production
- Rick Beato – production, engineering (tracks 1–12, 14)
- Greg Wells – production (track 13)
- Seth Bolt – engineering, mixing (tracks 2, 5)
- Ken "Grand" Lanyon – engineer (tracks 1–12, 14)
- Ian MacGregor – engineering (tracks 13)
- Mark Endert – mixing (tracks 1, 3, 6–14)
- Tchad Blake – mixing (track 4)
- Bo Rinehart – mixing (track 5), art direction, design
- Leland Elliott – additional engineering
- Randall Harris – additional engineering
- Eric Legg – additional engineering
- Ryan Stukenbroeker – additional engineering
- Ted Jensen – mastering at Sterling Sound (New York, NY)
- Anthony Delia – A&R, marketing
- Pete Ganbarg – A&R
- Aryanna Platt – A&R administration
- Kip Krones – management
- Joshua Drake – photography

== Charts ==
=== Weekly charts ===
Chart (2011)	Peak position
US Billboard 200	6
US Top Christian Albums (Billboard)	1
US Digital Albums (Billboard)	4
US Top Rock Albums (Billboard)	1

=== Year-end charts ===
Chart (2011)	Positions
US Top Christian Albums (Billboard)	19
US Top Rock Albums (Billboard)	70
Chart (2012)	Positions
US Top Christian Albums (Billboard)	21

=== Singles ===
Single	Year	Peak chart positions		
Single	Year	US Christian	US Heat	Triple A
"Slumber"	2011	26	—	—
"The Reckoning"	2011	—	24	—
"Drive All Night"	2011	—	—	15
"Able"	2012	46	—	—

== Tour ==
The band completed The Reckoning Tour, which included the following stops.

Tour dates
Date	City	Country	Venue
February 15, 2012	Houston	United States	Warehouse Live
February 16, 2012	Dallas	United States	House of Blues
February 17, 2012	Dallas	United States	House of Blues
February 18, 2012	Austin	United States	Stubbs
February 20, 2012	Birmingham	United States	Alabama Theatre
February 21, 2012	Searcy	United States	Harding University
February 23, 2012	Nashville	United States	Ryman Auditorium
February 24, 2012	Nashville	United States	Ryman Auditorium
February 25, 2012	Atlanta	United States	The Tabernacle
February 26, 2012	Tampa	United States	Ritz Ybor
February 27, 2012	Orlando	United States	House of Blues
February 29, 2012	Atlanta	United States	The Tabernacle
March 1, 2012	Knoxville	United States	Tennessee Theatre
March 2, 2012	Charlotte	United States	Ovens Auditorium
March 3, 2012	Charleston	United States	North Charleston Performing Arts Center
March 9, 2012	Murray	United States	Lovett Auditorium
March 10, 2012	St. Louis	United States	The Pageant
March 11, 2012	Kansas City	United States	Midland Theatre
March 12, 2012	Denver	United States	Ogden Theatre
March 15, 2012	Portland, OR	United States	Crystal Ballroom
March 16, 2012	Vancouver	Canada	Vogue Theatre
March 17, 2012	Seattle	United States	Moore Theatre
March 19, 2012	San Francisco	United States	The Fillmore
March 20, 2012	Los Angeles	United States	Club Nokia
March 23, 2012	Tulsa	United States	Brady Theater
March 24, 2012	Ames	United States	Stephens Auditorium
March 25, 2012	Madison	United States	Orpheum Theatre
March 26, 2012	Grand Rapids	United States	Intersection
March 27, 2012	Detroit	United States	Royal Oak Music Theatre
March 29, 2012	Minneapolis	United States	First Avenue
March 30, 2012	Minneapolis	United States	First Avenue
March 31, 2012	Chicago	United States	Riviera Theatre
April 3, 2012	Augusta	United States	Drive for Show, Rock Fore! Dough
April 10, 2012	Lexington	United States	Singletary
April 11, 2012	Cleveland	United States	House of Blues
April 12, 2012	Indianapolis	United States	Egyptian Room
April 13, 2012	Pittsburgh	United States	Stage AE
April 14, 2012	Toronto	Canada	Phoenix Concert Theatre
April 16, 2012	Portland, ME	United States	State Theatre
April 17, 2012	Boston	United States	House of Blues
April 19, 2012	New York City	United States	Webster Hall
April 20, 2012	Philadelphia	United States	Electric Factory
April 21, 2012	Washington D.C.	United States	9:30 Club
April 23, 2012	Lynchburg	United States	Liberty University
April 26, 2012	Raleigh	United States	Memorial Auditorium
April 27, 2012	Clemson	United States	Little John Coliseum
April 29, 2012	Panama City	United States	Rock By The Sea
May 6, 2012	Valdosta	United States	Wild Adventures theme park
June 7, 2012	Manchester	United States	Bonnaroo Music Festival
June 8, 2012	Manchester	United States	Bonnaroo Music Festival
June 9, 2012	Manchester	United States	Bonnaroo Music Festival
June 10, 2012	Manchester	United States	Bonnaroo Music Festival
September 7, 2012	Orlando	United States	Walt Disney World
