= Out of Body (Needtobreathe album) =

Studio album by Needtobreathe
- Released: August 28, 2020
- Studios: Club Roar and The Casonic Lodge (Nashville, Tennessee)
- Genres: Alternative rock; Christian rock; Southern rock
- Length: 44:07
- Label: Elektra
- Producers: Cason Cooley; Jeremy Lutito; Needtobreathe

Needtobreathe chronology
Acoustic Live Vol. 1 (2018)	Out of Body (2020)	Live from the Woods Vol. 2 (2021)

Singles from Out of Body
- 1. "Hang On" Released: April 30, 2020; 2. "Seasons" Released: April 30, 2020; 3. "Survival" Released: June 11, 2020; 4. "Who Am I" Released: June 25, 2020; 5. "Banks" Released: July 30, 2020

Professional ratings
Review scores
Source	Rating
AllMusic	4.5/5 stars
Dead Press	7/10 stars
Distorted Sound	5/10 stars
Jesus Freak Hideout	4.5/5 stars
Louder Than the Music	5/5 stars

Out of Body is the seventh studio album by American rock band Needtobreathe, released on August 28, 2020, through Elektra Records. It is the last album featuring the band's co-founder Bo Rinehart.

== Background ==
Four years after the release of their last full-length studio album, Hard Love, and following some speculation by fans of the band, Needtobreathe announced the exit of band member Bo Rinehart on April 21, 2020. Soon after, the band released two singles, "Hang On" and "Seasons" on April 30, and announced the release of Out of Body later in the year. "Survival", featuring Drew & Ellie Holcomb, was released on June 11, and "Who Am I" was released on June 25. The final single, "Banks", was released on July 30.

== Promotion ==
The band hosted a ticketed livestream concert entitled "Celebrating Out of Body" on the day of the album's release, August 28, 2020. The band performed a series of two more ticketed interactive livestream concerts, entitled "All Dressed Up & Nowhere To Go" from their rehearsal space on January 21 and 22, 2021. As a result of the COVID-19 pandemic, the band was unable to tour Out of Body, however they performed three socially-distanced concerts at The Caverns in Pelham, Tennessee on March 12, 13 and 14, 2021. They later released Live from the Woods Vol. 2, composed of tracks recorded live at these shows.

== Awards and accolades ==
Out of Body won Rock/Contemporary Album of the Year and "Who Am I" won Rock/Contemporary Recorded Song of the Year at the 52nd GMA Dove Awards.

== Track listing ==
No.	Title	Writer(s)	Length
1.	"Mercy's Shore"	Bear Rinehart; Tyler Burkum	4:50
2.	"Alive"	Bear Rinehart; Bo Rinehart; Seth Bolt; Josh Lovelace	3:08
3.	"Hang On"	Bear Rinehart; Bo Rinehart; Ian Fitchuk; Daniel Tashian	4:15
4.	"Survival"	Bear Rinehart; Lovelace; Cason Cooley; Jeremy Lutito	4:27
5.	"Child Again"	Bear Rinehart; Cooley; Lutito; Emily Weisband	3:49
6.	"Out of Body"	Bear Rinehart; Cooley; Lutito	3:30
7.	"Who Am I"	Bear Rinehart; Cooley; Lutito; Jordan Reynolds; Thomas Rhett	3:27
8.	"Banks"	Bear Rinehart; Bo Rinehart; Trent Dabbs	4:00
9.	"Riding High"	Bear Rinehart; Bo Rinehart; Bolt; Lovelace; Cooley; Dabbs	4:06
10.	"Bottom of a Heartbreak"	Bear Rinehart; Chloe Gasparini; Jayson DeZuzio; Neil Ormandy	4:32
11.	"Seasons"	Bear Rinehart; Bo Rinehart; Bolt; Lovelace	4:03
Total length:			44:07

== Personnel ==
Credits adapted from AllMusic.

=== Needtobreathe ===
- Bear Rinehart – lead vocals, background vocals (3), acoustic guitar (3, 4, 5, 9), electric guitar (4, 8), mandola (6), synthesizers (8)
- Seth Bolt – background vocals, bass guitar (1–9, 11), electric guitar (10)
- Josh Lovelace – background vocals, acoustic piano (1, 3–11), organ (1, 2, 4, 5, 7, 8, 9), mandola (1, 8), Yamaha CP-70 electric grand piano (2, 3, 6, 10), synthesizers (3), acoustic guitar (6), marxophone (6), harmonica (8), Rhodes piano (10)

=== Additional musicians ===
- Cason Cooley – synthesizers (1, 2, 5, 7, 8, 10, 11), banjo (1, 10), background vocals (1–4, 6, 7, 10), textures (2, 5, 8, 9), keyboards (3, 4), programming (3, 4, 5, 8–11), synth bass (3–7), acoustic piano (5, 7), dulcimer (5), acoustic guitar (6, 10), mandola (6), organ (10), sampling (10), mandolin (10), lap dulcimer (10)
- Tyler Burkum – electric guitars (1–10), acoustic guitar (1, 3, 5–8, 10), background vocals (1–4, 6, 7, 9, 10, 11), guitars (11)
- Will Carter – banjo (1, 3, 4), pedal steel guitar (1, 3, 4), lap steel guitar (3, 4)
- Jeremy Lutito – drums (1–4, 6–11), synthesizers (2, 5, 7), programming (2, 3, 5–8), percussion (2, 3, 6, 8, 9, 11), snare drum (5), dulcimer (8), acoustic piano (10), sampling (10)
- Randall Harris – percussion (2, 4, 9, 11), background vocals (2, 3, 6, 7, 9, 10, 11), banjo (3), acoustic guitar (8), drums (10)
- Drew Holcomb – lead and background vocals (4)
- Ellie Holcomb – lead and background vocals (4)
- Trent Dabbs – background vocals (9)
- Jeremy Lister – background vocals (8, 10, 11)
- Heather Rigdon – background vocals (8, 10, 11)
- Ashley Wilcox – background vocals (8, 10, 11)
- Amber Woodhouse – background vocals (8, 10, 11)
- Everett Cooley, Knox Cooley, Rowan Cooley, Henry Lovelace, Amelia Lutito, Isla Lutito – children's choir (6)

=== Technical ===
- Konrad Snyder – engineering
- Cason Cooley – engineering (1–9, 11), vocal engineering (4)
- Jeremy Lutito – engineering (1–9, 11)
- Tyler Burkum – engineering (10)
- Josh Lovelace – additional engineering (7)
- Sean Moffitt – mixing (1, 5–8, 10)
- Joe Visciano – mixing (2, 3, 4, 9, 11)
- Joe LaPorta – mastering at Sterling Sound (New York, NY)
- Will McDonald – A&R
- Allison Murphy – A&R administration
- Steve Bursky, Ryan Norris Anderson, Mallory Mason – management

=== Design ===
- Jeremy Cowart – cover photography
- Mary Hooper – creative direction, design
- Needtobreathe – creative direction

== Charts ==
Chart (2020)	Peak position
Canadian Albums (Billboard)	69
US Billboard 200	17
US Top Album Sales (Billboard)	4
US Top Alternative Albums (Billboard)	2
US Top Christian Albums (Billboard)	1
US Top Rock Albums (Billboard)	2

=== Songs ===
Song	Chart	Peak position	Peak Date	Weeks On Chart
"Who Am I"	Adult Top 40 Airplay	38	January 16, 2021	3
"Who Am I"	Alternative Digital Song Sales	13	September 19, 2020	3
"Who Am I"	Christian Airplay	5	December 5, 2020	26
"Who Am I"	Christian Digital Song Sales	8	September 19, 2020	14
"Who Am I"	Christian Streaming Songs	13	September 12, 2020	18
"Who Am I"	Hot Alternative Songs	14	November 14, 2020	13
"Who Am I"	Hot Christian Songs	8	September 12, 2020	28
"Who Am I"	Hot Rock & Alternative Songs	14	November 14. 2020	20
"Who Am I"	Rock Digital Song Sales	11	September 19, 2020	1
"Survival"	Alternative Digital Song Sales	12	June 27, 2020	1
"Survival"	Christian Airplay	18	June 5, 2021	17
"Survival"	Hot Christian Songs	26	May 1, 2021	21
"Survival"	Rock Digital Song Sales	10	June 27, 2020	1
"Hang On"	Alternative Digital Song Sales	11	May 9, 2020	2
"Hang On"	Hot Christian Songs	24	September 12, 2020	8
"Hang On"	Hot Rock & Alternative Songs	33	May 16, 2020	1
"Hang On"	Rock Digital Song Sales	9	May 16, 2020	2
"Seasons"	Alternative Digital Song Sales	17	May 9, 2020	2
"Seasons"	Hot Christian Songs	30	September 12, 2020	2
"Seasons"	Rock Digital Song Sales	17	May 9, 2020	1
"Banks"	Alternative Digital Song Sales	17	August 15, 2020	1
"Banks"	Hot Christian Songs	27	September 12, 2020	21
"Banks"	Rock Digital Song Sales	11	August 15, 2020	1
"Child Again"	Hot Christian Songs	36	September 12, 2020	1
"Out of Body"	Hot Christian Songs	39	September 12, 2020	1
"Riding High"	Hot Christian Songs	42	September 12, 2020	1
"Bottom of a Heartbreak"	Hot Christian Songs	40	September 12, 2020	1
