= Jonah Kagen =

American singer, songwriter and musician (born 2000)

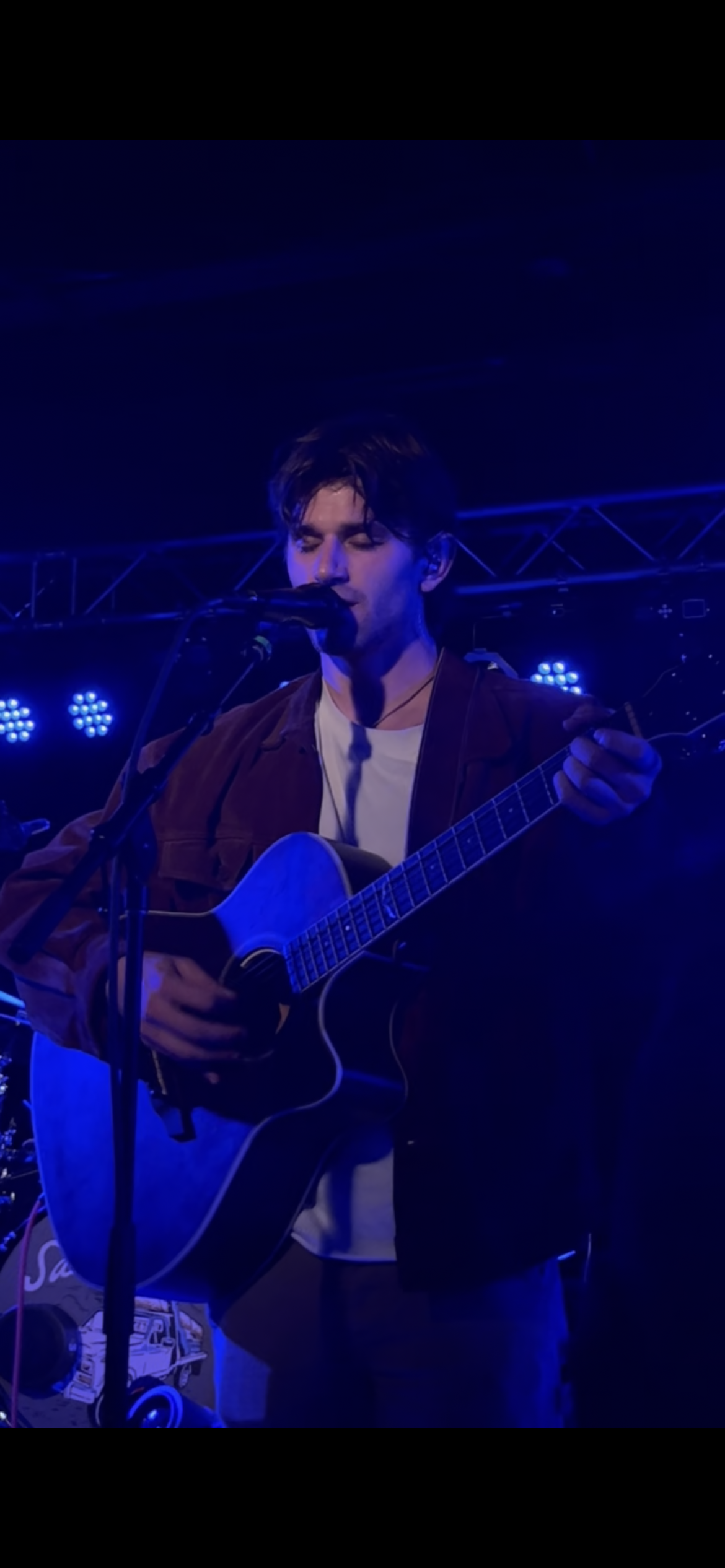
- Kagen in 2022

Background information
- Born: Jonah Kagen; January 10, 2000 (age 26); Savannah, Georgia
- Years active: 2021–present
- Label: Arista
- Website: www.jonahkagen.com

Jonah Kagen is an American singer, songwriter, and multi-instrumentalist from Savannah, Georgia. His single "God Needs the Devil" topped the Billboard Alternative Airplay chart in May 2025. Later in 2025, he released his second album, Sunflowers and Leather, which was written while traveling the United States with an Airstream trailer.

== Life and Career ==
Jonah Kagen was born in Savanah, Georgia, on January 10, 2000, to Alan and Kristin Kagen. He attended Shattuck-St. Mary's School in Faribault, Minnesota, where he played four years of varsity soccer. He graduated from Shattuck-St. Mary's School in 2018. He went on to attend Cornell University and received his Bachelor of Arts in psychology in 2022. During his time at Cornell, he played on the soccer team, being named to the All-Ivy second-team and co-captaining the team in his final season.

== Discography ==
=== Albums ===
- Georgia Got Colder (2022)
- Sunflowers and Leather (2025)
- Eternity of Anything (2026)

=== EPs ===
- Made Up My Mind (2023)
- The Roads (2023)
- Black Dress (2024)

=== Singles ===
- broken (2021)
- Moon (2021)
- Summer Feeling (2021)
- Wish You Did (2021)
- Catching a Dream (2021)
- Drowning (2022)
- Turbulence (2022)
- Barcelona (2022)
- hill that i'll die on (2022)
- graveyard shift (2022)
- 18 (2022)
- Pollution (2023)
- God Needs The Devil (2024)
- Matches (2024)
- The Reaper (2025)
- Burn Me (2025)
- Mississippi River Bluebird (2026)
- Talkin' About Jesus (2026)

=== Billboard Chart Peak Positions ===
Title	Year	Peak chart positions				Album
Title	Year	US AAA	US Airplay	US Alt.	US Rock	Album
"The Roads"	2023	—	—	24	—	The Roads
"God Needs the Devil"	2024	22	9	1	30	Black Dress
"You Again"	2025	37	—	—	—	Sunflowers and Leather
