= Evan Honer =

- Born: 2001 or 2002 (age 24–25)
- Education: California Baptist University
- Occupation: Musician
- Musical career
- Genres: Country music, indie folk
- Label: Cloverdale Records
- Website: evanhoner.com

Evan Honer (born 2001 or 2002) is an American musician and former diver for the California Baptist Lancers.

== Early life and education ==
Honer is from Surprise, Arizona. Honer credits his father with influencing his taste in music, including the Eagles, Jim Croce and James Taylor. Honer competed in gymnastics from a young age; he was an Arizona regional champion at the age of 10, but stopped playing the sport by the age of 13. Honer began playing the guitar at 13 years of age, but quickly grew bored of doing so. In 2019, while living in Southern California, Honer and his brother ran the YouTube channel HowToByBros, eventually reaching 200,000 subscribers. Honer graduated from California Baptist University in 2022.

=== Competitive diving ===
Honer began competing in diving in high school. As a member of the California Baptist Lancers diving team, Honer was named Western Athletic Conference (WAC) Diver of the Year in 2021 and qualified for WAC's All-Academic Team. Honer wished to qualify for the 2024 Summer Olympics, but missed the score cutoff during trials. Honer became less interested in diving from that point on.

== Musical career ==
Honer began writing music during the COVID-19 pandemic, releasing an original song, "How Could I Ever". In 2022, Honer auditioned for the singing competition television series American Idol. During his audition, Honer was told by judge Luke Bryan to "stick to diving". Honer released his debut album, West on I-10, in 2022 or 2023. His second album, Fighting For, was released on June 7, 2024. He released his third album, Everything I Wanted, on September 19, 2025, followed by an album entitled Halfway, which was released exclusively on vinyl, in April of 2026. Honer releases music on his self-published label Cloverdale Records.

== Discography ==
=== Albums ===
- West on I-10
- Fighting For (2024)
- Everything I Wanted

=== EPs ===
- Fighting For (2024)
- Different Life (2024)
- Annabelle (2024)

=== Charting singles ===
List of charting singles, with select chart positions, showing year released and album name
| Title | Year | Peak chart positions | Album |
| Title | Year | IRE | Album |
|---|---|---|---|
| "Jersey Giant" (with Julia DiGrazia) | 2022 | 68 | Non-album single |
