= Bear Rinehart =

American singer-songwriter (born 1980)

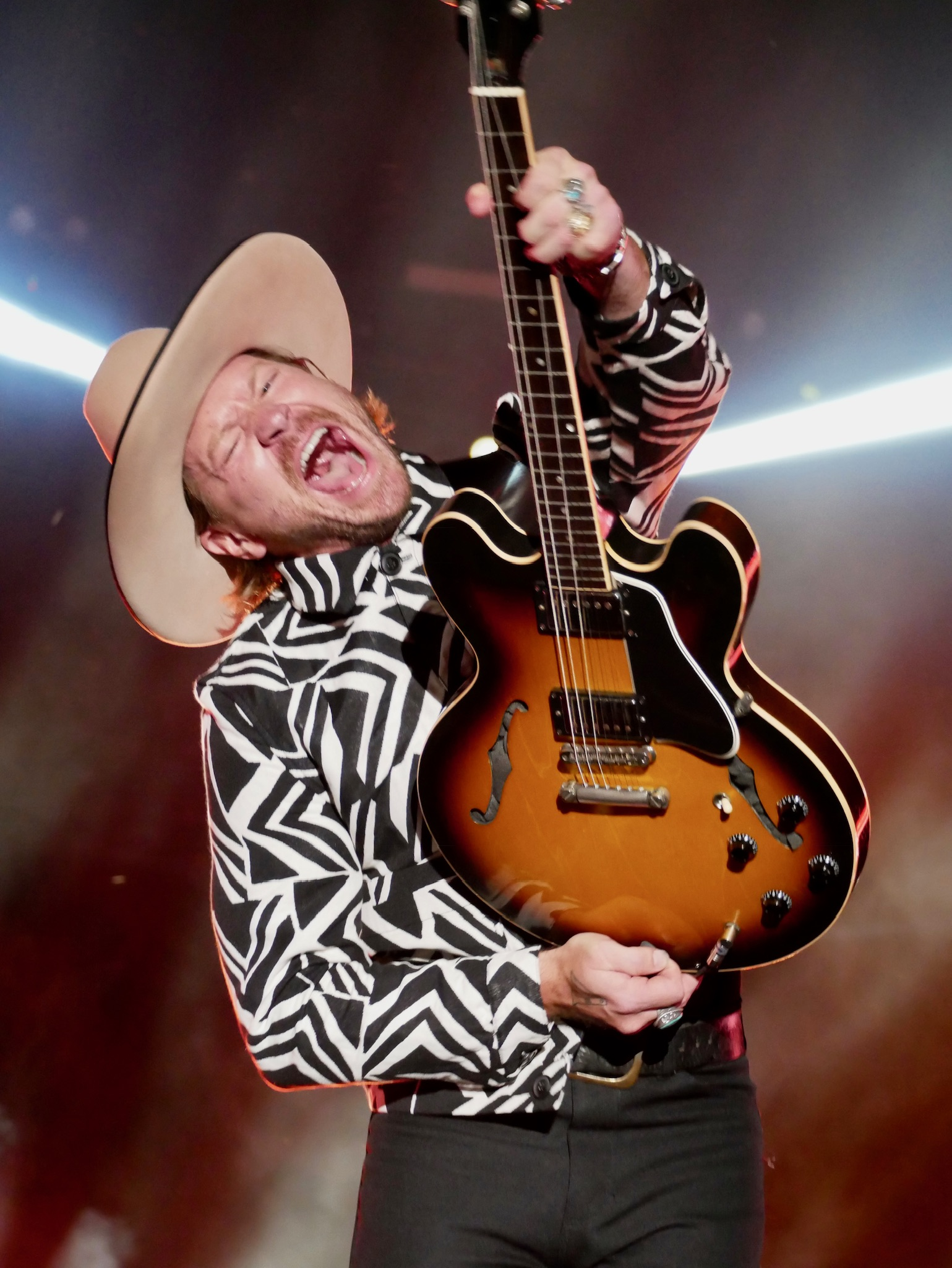
- Rinehart in 2023

Background information
- Also known as: Wilder Woods
- Born: William Stanley Rinehart III; September 6, 1980 (age 46); Greenville, South Carolina
- Genres: soul; pop; folk; R&B; contemporary R&B; roots rock; Americana; rock; gospel
- Occupations: Singer; songwriter; guitarist
- Instruments: Guitar; piano; harmonica
- Years active: 1998–present
- Labels: Atlantic; Dualtone
- Member of: Needtobreathe
- Spouse: Mary Reames
- Website: iamwilderwoods.com

William Stanley "Bear" Rinehart III (born September 6, 1980), also known by the stage name Wilder Woods, is an American singer, songwriter, and guitarist who is a founding member and lead singer of the rock band, Needtobreathe. In 2019, he announced the launch of a solo career under the name Wilder Woods. His debut solo album was released on Atlantic Records in August 2019. His second album, Fever / Sky was released on Dualtone Records in March 2023.

== Career ==
In April 2019, Rinehart began releasing music under the name Wilder Woods, starting with the songs "Someday Soon" and "Sure Ain't". The stage name comes from the names of Rinehart's two oldest sons, Wilder and Woods. His eponymous debut solo studio album was released in August 2019 by Atlantic Records. The album debuted at No. 20 on Billboard Emerging Artists and No. 2 on Top Heatseekers. The album single "Supply & Demand" peaked at No. 19 on the Adult Alternative Songs chart.

In December 2019, Norwegian DJ Matoma, Michigan-born producer Petey Martin, and Wilder Woods debuted the single "Keep It Simple". An acoustic version and remix with Rayet followed in 2020.

In February 2021, Rinehart independently released "sink our love now (work tape)" under his Wilder Woods moniker. The demos "man made weather" and "heavenly light" debuted in the following months. In April 2021, Rinehart released the work tapes ep which included the three songs. Rinehart recorded each of the demos by himself in his home studio in Franklin, Tennessee.

Preceded by the singles "Maestro (Tears Don't Lie)", "Get It Back", and "Patience" in early 2023, Fever / Sky released in March 2023 through Dualtone Records. The lead single, "Maestro (Tears Don't Lie)" peaked at No. 12 on the Adult Alternative Airplay chart. The album was dedicated to Rinehart's third son, Waters. Most of the album's songs were written in Rinehart's home while touring was paused during the COVID-19 pandemic. Prominent contributors included producer Cason Cooley and guitarist Tyler Burkum. A headline tour of the United States followed in April to May 2023.

Songwriting for Rinehart's third Wilder Woods release, Curioso, began in 2023 with several collaborators and co-writers. In September 2024, "Hide Anymore" and "Devil in My Eyes" were released as the first singles from the album. "Time on My Hands" and "Offering" were released in October and November 2024, respectively. The album is scheduled to release in February 2025.

Rinehart has been a featured artist on a variety of songs for acts such as MercyMe, American Authors and others.

As a member of Needtobreathe, Rinehart was nominated for a Grammy Award in 2015.

== Personal life ==
Rinehart is married to Mary Reames, with whom he has three sons. Rinehart was an accomplished college football wide receiver. A teammate of quarterback and former University of Florida head coach Billy Napier, the pair set numerous school records together at Furman University between 1999 and 2002.

On June 13, 2025, Bear's brother and former bandmate Bo Rinehart posted on Instagram a statement alleging that Bear had sexually, emotionally and physically abused him throughout their childhood. Bear responded to these allegations on social media on June 14, 2025, writing in part that "My brother and I were both sexually abused at the age of 8 and 6 by a teenage counselor at the Christian camp where we grew up... Bo's recent accusation of me conflates our shared experience of abuse with a childhood incident he misrepresents." Bear went on to ask for prayer for their family and expressed hope for reconciliation between him and his brother. Bo and Bear both subsequently deleted the posts from their respective Instagram accounts.

== Discography ==
=== Albums ===
==== Studio albums ====
List of studio albums
Title	Album details
Wilder Woods	Released: August 9, 2019; Label: Atlantic; Formats: CD, digital download, streaming; 10 songs, 34 minutes and 33 seconds
Fever / Sky	Released: March 24, 2023; Label: Dualtone; Formats: CD, LP, digital download, streaming; 11 songs, 41 minutes
Curioso	Released: February 7, 2025; Label: Dualtone; Formats: CD, LP, digital download, streaming; 10 songs, 35 minutes

==== Live albums ====
- Live from The Ryman (2025)

=== EPs ===
- the work tapes ep (2021)
- The House Sessions (2025)

=== Singles ===
==== As lead artist ====
List of singles as lead artist, with selected chart positions, showing year released and album name
Title	Year	Peak chart positions	Album
Title	Year	US AAA	Album
"Supply & Demand"	2019	19	Wilder Woods
"Electric Woman"	2019	—	Wilder Woods
"Supply & Demand" (Oliver Nelson & Tobtok remix)	2019	—	non-album singles
"Supply & Demand" (Jean Tonique remix)	2019	—	non-album singles
"Someday Soon"	2020	—	Wilder Woods
"sink our love now (work tape)"	2021	—	the work tapes ep
"man made weather (work tape)"	2021	—	the work tapes ep
"heavenly light (work tape)"	2021	—	the work tapes ep
"Maestro (Tears Don't Lie)"	2023	12	Fever / Sky
"Get It Back"	2023	—	Fever / Sky
"Patience"	2023	—	Fever / Sky
"Maestro (Tears Don't Lie)" (Stripped Sessions)	2023	—	non-album singles
"Be Yourself" (Stripped Sessions)	2023	—	non-album singles
"Make Your Own Mistakes" (Stripped Sessions)	2023	—	non-album singles
"Bring It On Home to Me" (with Abraham Alexander)	2023	—	Discovered & Covered (compilation album by Dualtone Records)
"Be Yourself" (original or featuring The War and Treaty)	2024	—	Fever / Sky
"Hide Anymore"	2024	—	Curioso
"Devil in My Eyes"	2024	—	Curioso
"Time on My Hands" (featuring Jim James)	2024	—	Curioso
"Offering" (featuring Anna Graves)	2024	—	Curioso
"Hide Anymore" (worktape)	2024	—	non-album singles
"Time on My Hands" (worktape)	2024	—	non-album singles
"Swimming in the Ocean" (with Haffway)	2025	—	non-album singles
"Time on My Hands" (with Nick Waterhouse)	2025	—	non-album singles
"—" denotes a single that did not chart or was not released in that territory.

==== As featured artist ====
List of singles as featured artist, showing year released and album name
Title	Year	Album
"Keep It Simple" (Matoma and Petey Martin featuring Wilder Woods)	2019	non-album single

=== Music videos ===
List of music videos, showing year released and directors
Title	Year	Director
"Someday Soon"	2019	Gus Black
"Sure Ain't"	2019	Gus Black
"Electric Woman"	2019	Unknown
"Supply & Demand"	2019	Gus Black
"Light Shine In"	2019	Unknown
"Maestro (Tears Don't Lie)"	2023	Elliott Eicheldinger
"Bring It On Home to Me"	2023	Unknown
"Be Yourself" (featuring The War and Treaty)	2024	Gus Black
