= Puressence discography =

This is a comprehensive discography of the group Puressence.

== Albums ==
Album information
Puressence
- Released: 29 April 1996
- Chart position: Did not chart
Only Forever
- Released: 17 August 1998
- Chart position: #36 UK
Planet Helpless
- Released: 7 October 2002
- Chart position: #81 UK, #4 GRE
Don't Forget to Remember
- Released: 24 September 2007
- Chart position: #176 UK
Sharpen Up the Knives
- Released: 19 October 2009
- Chart position: #4 GRE
Solid State Recital
- Released 2 May 2011

== EPs ==
Petrol Skin EP
- Released: 6 July 1993

== Singles ==
Siamese/Scapa Flow
- Released: June 1992
- UK Chart position:
Offshore
- Released: 19 April 1993
- UK Chart position:

=== Puressence Singles ===
I Suppose
- Released: 8 May 1995
- UK Chart position: 190
Fire
- Released: 13 November 1995
- UK Chart position: 132
India
- Released: 15 May 1996
- UK Chart position: 109
Traffic Jam In Memory Lane
- Released: 3 June 1996
- UK Chart position: 105
Casting Lazy Shadows
- Released: 5 August 1996
- UK Chart position: 89

=== Only Forever Singles ===
This Feeling
- Released: 11 May 1998
- UK Chart position: 33
It Doesn't Matter Anymore
- Released: 27 July 1998
- UK Chart position: 47
All I Want
- Released: 9 November 1998
- UK Chart position: 39
All I Want/Never Be The Same Again
- Released: 9 November 1998
- UK Chart position: 39

=== Planet Helpless Singles ===
Walking Dead
- Released: 23 September 2002
- UK Chart position: 40

=== Don't Forget To Remember Singles ===
Palisades/Moonbeam
- Release date: 11 December 2006
- UK Chart position: 106
- UK Indie Singles chart position: 5

The single was limited to 1000 copies only.

Drop Down To Earth
- Released: 10 September 2007
- UK Chart position: 56
Don't Know Any Better
- Released: 24 May 2008
- UK Chart position: 109
