= Carlos Eduardo =

Carlos Eduardo is a masculine Portuguese given name. Notable people with the name include:

== Nickname of footballers ==
- Carlos Eduardo (footballer, born 1980), Carlos Eduardo Bizzaro, Brazilian defender
- Carlos Eduardo (footballer, born 1987), Carlos Eduardo Marques, Brazil international attacking midfielder
- Carlos Eduardo (footballer, born 1989), Carlos Eduardo de Oliveira Alves, Brazilian midfielder for Mirassol
- Carlos Eduardo (footballer, born 1992), Carlos Eduardo Soares Mota, Brazilian goalkeeper for Persija Jakarta
- Carlos Eduardo (footballer, born 1993), Carlos Eduardo Manso de Carvalho, Brazilian midfielder
- Carlos Eduardo (footballer, born October 1996), Carlos Eduardo Ferreira de Souza, Brazilian winger for Mirassol
- Carlos Eduardo (footballer, born November 1996), Carlos Eduardo da Silva Cândido, Brazilian right-back for Portuguesa
- Carlos Eduardo (footballer, born 2001), Carlos Eduardo da Silva Rodrigues Lima, Brazilian centre-back for Portuguesa
- Carlos Eduardo (footballer, born 2002), Carlos Eduardo Borges Parente, Brazilian football forward for Gil Vicente

== Given name ==
- Carlos Eduardo (fighter), known as Cachorrão, (born 1981), Brazilian mixed martial artist
- Carlos Eduardo de Castro Lourenço, known as Rincón, (born 1987), Brazilian footballer
- Carlos Eduardo Castro da Silva, known as Cadu, (born 1982), Brazilian footballer
- Carlos Eduardo Ferrari, known as Caca, (born 1979), Brazilian footballer
- Carlos Eduardo Moreira Ferreira (1939–2022), Brazilian businessman and politician
- Carlos Eduardo de Fiori Mendes, known as Cadu, (born 1986), Brazilian footballer
- Carlos Eduardo Gallardo, Guatemalan footballer
- Carlos Eduardo Gutiérrez, Uruguayan footballer
- Carlos Eduardo Lopes, known as Du Lopes, (born 1980), Brazilian footballer
- Carlos Eduardo Marangon, known as Edu Marangon, (born 1963), Brazilian footballer and manager
- Carlos Eduardo Peruena Rodríguez, Uruguayan footballer
- Carlos Eduardo Rocha, known as Tá Danado, (born 1981), Brazilian mixed martial artist
- Carlos Eduardo Santos Oliveira, known as Eduardo, (born 1986), Brazilian footballer
- Carlos Eduardo Salazar, Colombian footballer
- Carlos Eduardo Schneider, known as Duda, Brazilian footballer
- Carlos Eduardo da Silva, known as Zumbi, (born 1980), Brazilian footballer
- Carlos Eduardo Soares, known as Ataliba, (born 1979), Brazilian footballer
- Carlos Eduardo de Souza Tomé, known as Dudu Paraíba, (born 1985), Brazilian footballer
- Carlos Eduardo Ventura, known as Duda, (born 1974), Brazilian footballer
