= Zombi =

Zombi may refer to:

- Zombi (film) or Dawn of the Dead, a 1978 film by George Romero
  - Zombi 2, a 1979 film by Lucio Fulci
    - Zombi (film series), a set of horror films
- Zombi (band), a space rock band from Pittsburgh
- "Zombi", a song by P-MODEL from the album Perspective
- Zombi (1986 video game), a computer game published in 1986 by Ubisoft
- ZombiU, a video game first published in 2012 by Ubisoft, also released under the title Zombi
- Zombi (African god), a snake-deity in Voodoo cults of West Africa and Haiti

== See also ==
- Zombie (disambiguation)
