= Walking Dead =

Walking Dead or The Walking Dead generically refers to zombies.

It may more specifically refer to:

== Arts, entertainment and media ==
=== The Walking Dead franchise ===
- The Walking Dead (franchise)
  - The Walking Dead (comic book) 2003–2019, source material
    - The Walking Dead (TV series), 2010–2022, based on the comic
      - The Walking Dead: Original Soundtrack – Vol. 1, 2013
      - Fear the Walking Dead, 2015–2023, spin-off series
      - The Walking Dead: World Beyond, 2020–2021, spin-off series
      - Tales of the Walking Dead, 2022, spin-off series
      - The Walking Dead: Dead City, 2023, spin-off series
      - The Walking Dead: Daryl Dixon, 2023, spin-off series
      - The Walking Dead: The Ones Who Live, 2024, spin-off series
  - The Walking Dead (video game series), 2012–2019, based on the comic
    - The Walking Dead (video game), 2012
  - The Walking Dead (pinball machine), 2014, based on the TV series
  - The Walking Dead: Cold Storage, 2012 web series
  - Fear the Walking Dead: Flight 462, 2015-2016 web series
  - The Walking Dead: Torn Apart, 2011 web series

=== Films ===
- The Walking Dead (1936 film)
- The Walking Dead (1995 film)

=== Literature ===
- Walking Dead, a 1977 novel by Peter Dickinson
- Walking Dead, a 2008 novel in the Atticus Kodiak series by Greg Rucka
- Walking Dead, a 2009 novel in the Walker Papers series by C. E. Murphy
- The Walking Dead, a 1984 novel by Guy N. Smith
- The Walking Dead, a 2000 novel by Gerald Seymour

=== Music ===
- "Walking Dead", a 2002 song by Puressence from the album Planet Helpless
- "Walking Dead", a 2005 song by Z-Trip
- "Walking Dead", a 2012 song by Papa Roach from The Connection
- "The Walking Dead (EP)", by Saint Vitus, 1985
- "The Walking Dead", a 2005 song by Dropkick Murphys from The Warrior's Code
- "The Walking Dead", a 2006 song by Zebrahead from Broadcast to the World
- "The Walking Dead", a 2008 song by Spinnerette from Spinnerette

=== Television ===
- "The Walking Dead" (NCIS: New Orleans)
- "The Walking Dead" (The Vampire Diaries)

=== Other ===
- The Walking Dead (Hunter: The Reckoning), a supplement for the role-playing game

== Other uses ==
- 1st Battalion, 9th Marines, nicknamed "The Walking Dead", an infantry battalion of the U.S. Marine Corps

== See also ==
- Dead Man Walking (disambiguation)
- Night of the Living Dead (disambiguation)
- Undead (disambiguation)
- Zombie (disambiguation)
- "The Waking Dead", a 2013 episode of supernatural drama television series Grimm
