= Dead Man Walking =

Dead Man Walking or Dead Man Walkin' or Dead Men Walking may refer to:

== Arts, entertainment and media ==
- Dead Man Walking (book), a 1993 non-fiction book by Sister Helen Prejean
  - Dead Man Walking (film), a 1995 film based on the book
    - Dead Man Walking (soundtrack), 1996, and the title song "Dead Man Walkin'" by Bruce Springsteen
  - Dead Man Walking (opera), 2000, by Jake Heggie, based on the book
  - Dead Man Walking (play), 2002, by Tim Robbins, based on the book
- "Dead Man Walking" (Sapphire & Steel), an audio drama based on the TV series
- Dead Men Walking (film), a 2005 film
- Dead Mann Walking, a 2011 novel by Stefan Petrucha

=== Television episodes ===
- "Dead Man Walking" (Body of Proof), 2011
- "Dead Man Walking" (NCIS), 2007
- "Dead Man Walking" (Robin Hood), 2006
- "Dead Man Walking" (Torchwood), 2008
- "Dead Man Walking" (Taggart), 2005
- "Dead Mann Walking", a 2017 episode of the comedy Mann & Wife

== Music ==
- Dead Men Walking, a British rock band

=== Albums ===
- Dead Man Walkin' (Snoop Dogg album), 2000
- Dead Man Walking (John Tibbs album), 2016
- Dead Man Walking (EP), by John Tibbs, 2015

=== Songs ===
- "Dead Man Walking" (Brent Faiyaz song), 2020
- "Dead Man Walking" (David Bowie song), 1997
- "Dead Man Walking" (Jelly Roll song), 2021
- "Dead Man Walking" (Smiley song), 2012
- "Dead Man Walking", by 2 Chainz, 2020
- "Dead Man Walking", by Black Veil Brides from Vale, 2018
- "Dead Man Walking", by Bloodsimple from Red Harvest, 2007
- "Dead Man Walking", by Body Count from Violent Demise: The Last Days, 1997
- "Dead Man Walking", by Butcher Babies from Take It Like a Man, 2015
- "Dead Man Walking", by Fear Factory from Digimortal, 2001
- "Dead Man Walking", by Jeremy Camp from The Story's Not Over, 2019
- "Dead Man Walking", by Jon Bellion
- "Dead Man Walkin'", by Lynyrd Skynyrd from Vicious Cycle, 2003
- "Dead Man Walking", by Milanese featuring Virus Syndicate
- "Dead Man Walking", by Onslaught from VI, 2013
- "Dead Man Walking", by Quarashi from Guerilla Disco, 2004
- "Dead Man Walking", by Serenity from Words Untold & Dreams Unlived, 2007
- "Dead Man Walking", by the Script from Science & Faith, 2010

== Other uses ==
- "Dead man walking", a phrase used to describe some multiple-vortex tornadoes, especially the 1997 Jarrell tornado

== See also ==
- Walking Dead (disambiguation)
- Dead clade walking, or extinction debt, in ecology
- Dead Man's Walk, a 1995 novel by Larry McMurtry
- Dead Man's Walk, Oxford, a footpath in England
