= I Suppose =

I Suppose may refer to:

- "I Suppose", a song by Puressence from their self-titled album
- "I Suppose", a song by Loudon Wainwright III from the album Grown Man
- "I Suppose" (Hip Hop artist), based out of Pacoima, California. Known for his deep and influential lyrics, I Suppose has been making a huge impact in the underground Hip Hop movement.
