= Erik Nieder =

American musician

- Born: Erik Nathan Nieder; September 1, 1989 (age 36); Dallas, Texas
- Origin: Coppell, Texas
- Genres: Folk, CCM, worship
- Occupations: Singer, songwriter, worship leader
- Instruments: vocals, guitar
- Years active: 2013–present
- Website: eriknieder.com

Erik Nathan Nieder (born September 1, 1989) is an American Christian musician and worship leader, who primarily plays Christian pop and folk music. He has released two studio albums, Secret of the Burning Heart, in 2013, and Valley of the Shadow, in 2015, both independently.

== Early and personal life ==
Nieder was born Erik Nathan Nieder, on September 1, 1989, in Dallas, Texas, the son of John William and Teryl Lynn Nieder (née Thompson); he grew up in nearby Coppell, Texas, playing baseball while enrolled at Coppell High School. He has an older sibling, Katie Jean Nieder. He started penning his own music at thirteen years-old. His collegiate studies took place at Texas A&M University, where he was involved with the Baptist Collegiate Ministry.

== Music career ==
He started his music recording career in 2013 with the studio album Secret of the Burning Heart, which was released on April 9, 2013. His subsequent studio album, Valley of the Shadow, was released on September 1, 2015, when he turned 26. The song "Dead Man Walking", as performed by John Tibbs featuring Ellie Holcomb, was written for his second album, and the rendition of the song by Tibbs and Holcomb charted on various Billboard magazine charts. His first extended play, The Narrow Sea, was released on February 26, 2016.

== Discography ==
Studio albums

- Secret of the Burning Heart (April 9, 2013)
- Valley of the Shadow (September 1, 2015)
- "The Narrow Sea" EP (February 26, 2016)
- "Faithful" EP (July 13, 2018)
- "Miracle Maker" (March 17, 2023)
