= Zumbi (disambiguation) =

Zumbi was the last of the kings of the Quilombo dos Palmares.

Zumbi may also refer to:

- "Zumbi" (song), a 1974 song by Brazilian samba-rock artist Jorge Ben
- Zumbi (Rio de Janeiro), a neighbourhood in the North Zone of Rio de Janeiro, Brazil
- Zumbi (footballer) (born 1980), Brazilian footballer
- Zumbi, Ecuador, the seat of Centinela del Cóndor Canton
- Zumbi (wrestler)
- Baba Zumbi (died 2021), co-founder of rap group Zion I

== See also ==
- Zombie (disambiguation)
