= I Want to Be Free =

I Want to Be Free may refer to:

- "I Want to Be Free" (Elvis Presley song), 1957
- "I Want to Be Free" (Toyah song), 1981
- "I Want to Be Free", a song by Ohio Players from the album Fire
- "I Want to Be Free", a song by Ellie Holcomb from the album As Sure as the Sun

== See also ==
- I Wanna Be Free (disambiguation)
