= Dead Man Walking (EP) =

EP by John Tibbs
- Released: October 30, 2015
- Genres: Southern rock, heartland rock, Contemporary Christian music, folk, Christian rock, folk rock, roots rock, country gospel, americana
- Length: 17:14
- Label: Fair Trade
- Producer: Ben Shive

John Tibbs chronology
Anchor (2013)	Dead Man Walking (2015)	Dead Man Walking (2016)

Dead Man Walking is the fourth extended play from John Tibbs. Fair Trade Services released the EP on October 30, 2015, where it was his first release with the label. Tibbs worked with Ben Shive, in the production of this EP.

== Critical reception ==
Professional ratings
Review scores
Source	Rating
365 Days of Inspiring Media	4/5 stars
CCM Magazine	4/5 stars
Jesus Freak Hideout	4.5/5 stars

Matt Conner, rating the EP four stars from CCM Magazine, says, "Tibbs shows off several facets—an impressive roots-rock foundation, impeccable taste with guests like Ellie Holcomb, a true gift for the memorable melodic turn." Awarding the EP four and a half stars for Jesus Freak Hideout, Alex Caldwell states, "Tibbs' Dead Man Walking EP is a refreshing dose of spirit, grit and passion" Joshua Andre, giving the EP four stars at 365 Days of Inspiring Media, writes, "John’s music is some of the most vulnerable and emotional songs I have heard in a long time!"

== Track list ==
Track list
No.	Title	Writer(s)	Length
1.	"Silver in Stone"		3:08
2.	"Abraham"	John Tibbs	3:22
3.	"Dead Man Walking" (featuring Ellie Holcomb)	Erik Nieder	3:07
4.	"Run Wild"	Tibbs	3:40
5.	"Love Stands Tall"	Cindy Morgan, Tibbs	3:57
Total length:			17:14
