= Medicine (Drew Holcomb and the Neighbors album) =

Studio album by Drew Holcomb and the Neighbors
- Released: January 27, 2015
- Genre: Americana, alternative rock, folk rock
- Length: 43:50
- Label: Magnolia
- Producer: Drew Holcomb and the Neighbors, Joe Pisapia

Drew Holcomb and the Neighbors chronology
Good Light (2013)	Medicine (2015)	Souvenir (2017)

Medicine is the seventh studio album by Drew Holcomb and the Neighbors, released on January 27, 2015 on Magnolia Music. Drew Holcomb and the Neighbors co-produced the album with Joe Pisapia. It is the successor to 2013's, Good Light. His wife and former band member, Ellie Holcomb, makes some appearances throughout the album.

== Critical reception ==
Professional ratings
Review scores
Source	Rating
Contactmusic.com	3/5 stars
Cross Rhythms	10/10 squares
Glide Magazine	8/10 stars
Indie Vision Music	5/5 stars
Jesus Freak Hideout	4/5 stars
Paste	7.8/10

Specifying in a 7.8 out of ten review by Paste, Hilary Saunders recognizes, the album "combine[s] those experiences of pragmatism and idealism, crafting a brand of country-tinged folk pop that balances artistic integrity with measured commerciality." Alex "Tincan" Caldwell, indicating in a four star review from Jesus Freak Hideout, realizes, the album has "these scrappy, down-home tunes might not be for everyone, but if you are up for some unvarnished, soulful songwriting at its best". Anthony Peronto, highlighting in a five star review from Indie Vision Music, refers, "Medicine is the perfect remedy." Writing for Contactmusic.com in a three out of five review, Ruth Buxton-Cook reports, the album "will certainly cure the monotony of life with its rich, sentimental vibe and smooth folksy rhythm."

== Track listing ==
All tracks are written by Drew Holcomb except for track No. 5, where he is a co-writer with Ian Fitchuk.

No.	Title	Length
1.	"American Beauty"	2:38
2.	"Tightrope"	3:58
3.	"Here We Go"	3:22
4.	"Shine Like Lightning"	3:17
5.	"Avalanche"	5:25
6.	"Heartbreak"	4:01
7.	"You'll Always Be My Girl"	2:53
8.	"Sisters Brothers"	3:16
9.	"The Last Thing We Do"	3:26
10.	"Ain't Nobody Got It Easy"	3:47
11.	"I've Got You"	2:36
12.	"When It's All Said and Done"	5:13
Total length:		43:50

== Charts ==
Chart (2015)	Peak position
US Billboard 200	47
US Americana/Folk Albums (Billboard)	6
US Independent Albums (Billboard)	9
US Top Rock Albums (Billboard)	12
