= Zombie (disambiguation) =

Traditionally, a zombie is an undead person in Haitian folklore, and is regularly encountered in fictional horror and fantasy themed works.

Zombi, Zombie(s), or Zomby may also refer to:

== People ==
- Rob Zombie (born 1965), born Robert Cummings, former lead singer of White Zombie
- "The Zombie" (born 1976), the ring name for Tim Arson, professional wrestler
- Zomby (born 1980), British music producer

== Arts, entertainment, and media ==
=== Fictional entities ===
- Zombie (comics), a 1953 character from Marvel Comics
- Zombie, a creature in the 1974 role-playing game Dungeons & Dragons
- Zombie, a creature found within the 2011 video game Minecraft
- Zombie, a species found in the game Plants Vs. Zombies.

=== Film and television ===
- Zombi (film series), a horror film series started in the 1970s
  - Dawn of the Dead (1978 film), titled Zombi or Zombies in the European version, a horror film directed by George Romero
  - Zombi 2 (1979), also known as Zombie or Zombie Flesh Eaters, a horror film directed by Lucio Fulci
- Zombie (2019 film), a horror-comedy adventure film
- Zombies, alternative name for Wicked Little Things (2006), a horror film directed by J. S. Cardone
- Zombies (2016 film), a horror-action film directed by Hamid Torabpour
- Zombies (franchise), a Disney film franchise
  - Zombies (2018 film), the first film in the franchise
  - Zombies: The Re-Animated Series, an animated television series part of the franchise
- Zombies (2019 film), a short film by Belgian rapper and filmmaker Balojji
- Zombies! Zombies! Zombies!, a 2008 comedy film directed by Jason M. Murphy

=== Music ===
==== Groups ====
- Zombi (band), a progressive rock duo
- Zombie Zombie (band), a French electropop duo
- The Zombies, an English rock band

==== Albums ====
- Zombie (album), by Fela Kuti and Afrika 70, 1976
- Zombie (EP), by The Devil Wears Prada, 2010
- The Zombie, a 2021 album by Aina the End
- Zombie (single album), by Everglow, 2024
- The Zombies (EP), a 1965 EP by The Zombies
- The Zombies (album), a 1965 album by The Zombies

==== Songs ====
- "Zombie" (Fela Kuti song), by Fela Kuti and Afrika 70, 1976
- "Zombie" (The Cranberries song), 1994
- "Zombie" (Gims song), 2013
- "Zombie" (Jamie T song), 2014
- "Zombie" (Everglow song), 2024
- "Zombie" (Yungblud song), 2025
- "Zombie", by Natalia Kills from Perfectionist, 2009
- "Zombie", by The Pretty Reckless from The Pretty Reckless, 2010
- "Zombie", by E-40 from The Block Brochure: Welcome to the Soil 2, 2012
- "Zombie", by Capital Bra and Samra from Berlin lebt 2, 2019
- "Zombie", by Day6 from The Book of Us: The Demon, 2020
- "Zombie", by Lecrae from Restoration, 2020
- "Zombie", by Purple Kiss from Hide & Seek, 2021
- "Zombie", by Kavinsky from Reborn, 2022
- "Zombies", by Childish Gambino from "Awaken, My Love!", 2016
- "Zombies", by Lacuna Coil from Broken Crown Halo, 2014

=== Gaming ===
- Zombie (magazine), a video gaming magazine published in Israel in the 1990s
- Zombie Studios, a video game development studio
- Zombie Zombie, a 1984 computer game for the ZX Spectrum
- Zombies!!!, a 2002 series of board games by Twilight Creations
  - Zombies (video game), a 2011 video game adaptation of the board game
- Zombies Ate My Neighbors, a 1993 video game, known in some countries simply as Zombies
- ZombiU (also known as Zombi), 2012 video game

=== Literature ===
- Le Zombie, a 1938-2001 science-fiction fanzine published by Bob Tucker
- Zombie (novel), a 1995 novel by Joyce Carol Oates
- Zom-B, a 2012–16 zombie apocalyptic novel series by Darren Shan

== Computing ==
- Zombie (computing), a compromised computer used to perform malicious tasks
- Zombie object, in garbage-collected object-oriented programming languages, an object that has been finalized but then resurrected
- Zombie process, on Unix-like OS, a process that has completed execution but still has an entry in the process table
- ZombieLoad, a security vulnerability on certain Intel processors

== Finance ==
- Zombie bank, a financial institution with an economic net worth less than zero that continues to operate because of implicit or explicit government support
- Zombie company, a company that needs bailouts in order to operate, or an indebted company that is able to repay the interest on its debts but not repay the principal

== Invertebrates ==
- Zombie ant, an ant infected by the parasitic fungus Ophiocordyceps unilateralis
- Zombie fly, a fly, Apocephalus borealis, that lays eggs in honeybees, which then become "zombees"
- Zombie spider, a spider, Cyclosa argenteoalba, infected by Reclinervellus nielseni

== Other uses ==
- Zombie (cocktail), a cocktail made of fruit juices, liqueurs, and various rums
- Zombie, a derisive name for Canadian conscripts during World War II; see Conscription Crisis of 1944
- Philosophical zombie, in philosophy, a person without qualia, sentience or conscious experience
- Smartphone zombie, pejorative term for inattentive phone users
- Wasp dope, a drug sometimes known by the street name zombie

== See also ==
- Jumbee
- Xombie (disambiguation)
- Zumbi (disambiguation)
- Zombi (disambiguation)
