= Magnolia (EP) =

Magnolia EP

EP by Ellie Holcomb
- Released: August 23, 2011
- Genre: Contemporary Christian music
- Length: 21:33
- Label: Drew Holcomb

Ellie Holcomb chronology
Magnolia EP (2011)	With You Now (2013)

Magnolia EP is the debut EP from the Christian singer-songwriter Ellie Holcomb. The EP released on August 23, 2011, by Drew Holcomb. This EP received commercial successes.

== Background ==
The EP released on August 23, 2011, by Drew Holcomb, and this was her first EP.

== Commercial performance ==
For the Billboard charting week of September 10, 2011, Magnolia EP was the No. 16 most sold album on the Christian Albums chart, and it was the No. 9 most sold album on the breaking-and-entry chart of the Heatseekers Albums. In addition, the album was the No. 48 most sold of the Independent Albums.

== Track listing ==
No.	Title	Writer(s)	Length
1.	"Magnolia"	Ellie Holcomb	3:59
2.	"Don't Forget His Love (Psalm 108)"	Holcomb, Brown Bannister	2:38
3.	"Grateful For Your Love"	Holcomb	4:04
4.	"The Valley"	Holcomb	3:34
5.	"My Heart Is Steadfast (Psalm 103)"	Holcomb	2:58
6.	"Anchor of Hope"	Holcomb, Bannister	3:04
7.	"Rock of Habitation"	Holcomb	1:16
Total length:			21:33

== Chart performance ==
Chart (2011)	Peak position
US Christian Albums (Billboard)	16
US Heatseekers Albums (Billboard)	9
US Independent Albums (Billboard)	48
