= After the Night =

After the Night may refer to:

- After the Night, a 1944 novel by Barbara Cartland
- After the Night, a 1995 romance novel by Linda Howard
- After the Night, a 2022 song by John Tibbs
- After the Night, a 2023 live album by Parannoul
