= TWD (disambiguation) =

TWD is the currency code of the New Taiwan dollar (NT$), the official currency of the Taiwan Area of the Republic of China.

TWD may also refer to:

- Jefferson County International Airport (IATA airport code: TWD), Jefferson County, State of Washington, USA
- Texting while driving, the act of composing, sending, or reading text messages, email, or making other similar use of the internet on a mobile device, while operating a motor vehicle
- Tiger Woods Design, golf course design company
- True wind direction, see Apparent wind in sailing
- Tsuen Wan District, a district of New Territories, Hong Kong
- Tuas Depot (MRT depot code: TWD), Singapore
- Tweants dialect (ISO 639 language code: twd)
- The Walking Dead (disambiguation)
- The Winery Dogs, an American rock supergroup
- Wings Aviation (ICAO airline code: TWD), Nigerian airline

== See also ==
- Syrian National Democratic Alliance (TWDS)
