= I Wanna Be Free =

I Wanna Be Free may refer to:

- "I Wanna Be Free" (The Monkees song), 1967
- "I Wanna Be Free" (Loretta Lynn song), 1971
- I Wanna Be Free (album), a 1971 album by Loretta Lynn
- "I Wanna Be Free", a song by Patti Labelle from Diary of a Mad Black Woman

== See also ==
- I Want to Be Free (disambiguation)
