= The Briton's Protection =

Listed pub in Manchester, England

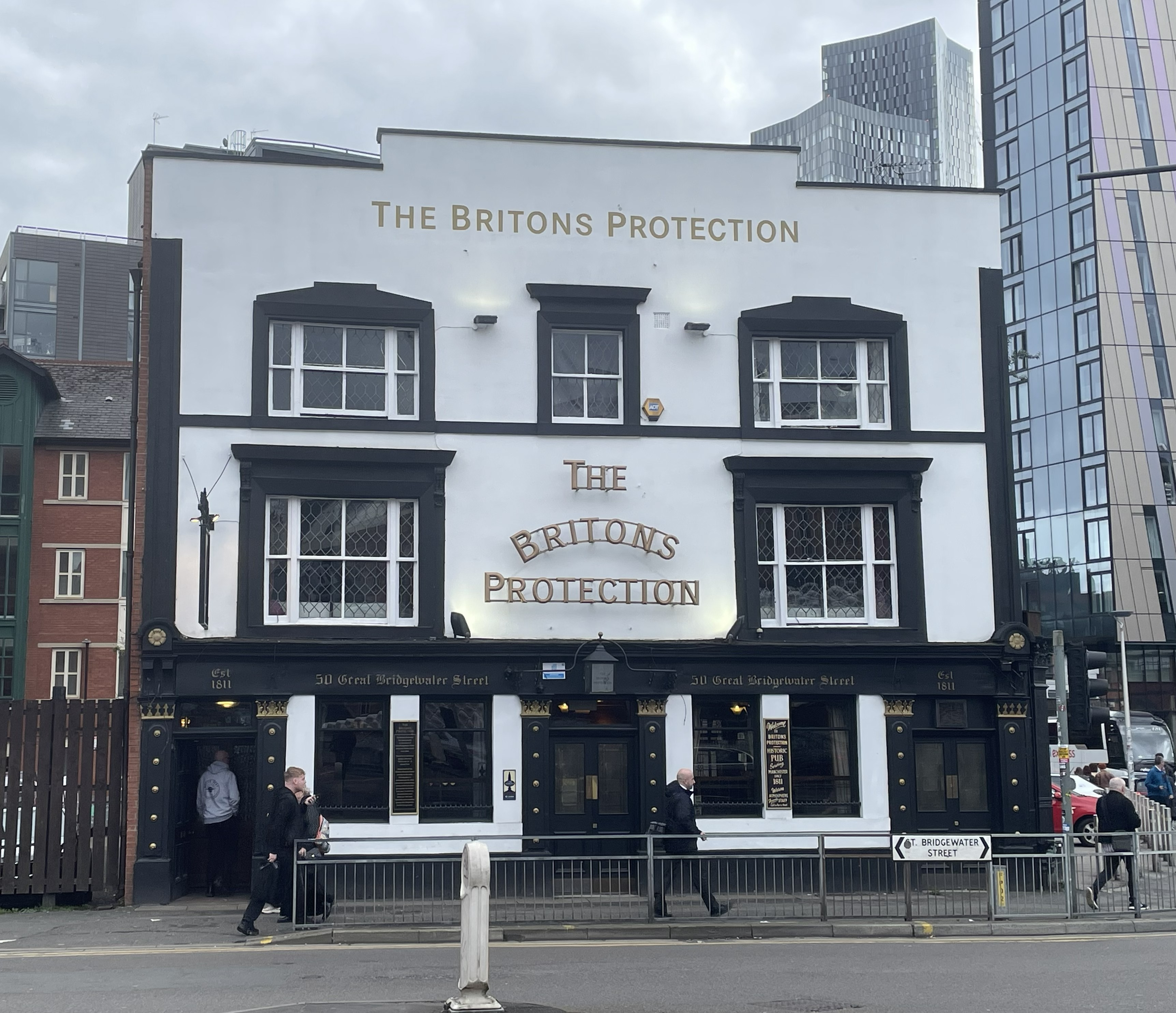
- The pub in 2026

General information
- Type: Public house
- Location: Great Bridgewater Street, Manchester, England
- Coordinates: 53.4750°N 2.2473°W
- Year built: Early 19th century
- Renovated: c. 1930 (remodelled)
- Owner: Heineken UK

Design and construction
- Designations

Listed Building – Grade II
- Official name: The Britons Protection public house
- Designated: 16 March 1990
- Reference no.: 1292050

Website
- thebritonsprotection.co.uk

The Briton's Protection is a Grade II listed public house on Great Bridgewater Street in Manchester, England. Known for its long association with army recruiting and its proximity to the Peterloo Massacre, it retains interior features from a remodelling carried out around 1930 and is rated three stars by the Campaign for Real Ale (CAMRA) for its nationally important historic interior. The pub has had several operators over its history and is noted today for its extensive whisky range.

== History ==
The building was constructed in the early 19th century, according to its official listing. Various dates have been suggested for its establishment: the pub's own website gives 1806, although its bicentenary was not marked until 2011. It also appeared in Pigot and Dean's New Directory of Manchester & Salford for 1821 and 1822. The pub's name reflects its past use as an army recruiting venue, a theme echoed in a set of murals inside the building. The Peterloo Massacre of 1819 took place nearby, and there are unconfirmed reports that some of the injured were brought into the pub and laid out on the bar for treatment.

The 1922 and 1934 Ordnance Survey maps mark the building as a public house without an attributed name. The interior was remodelled around 1930, and much of that work still survives.

On 16 March 1990, the Briton's Protection was designated a Grade II listed building. It was included on the Campaign for Real Ale (CAMRA)'s National Inventory of Historic Pub Interiors before the system was revised. Under the revised scheme, it is rated three stars and its interior is regarded as being "of outstanding national historic importance".

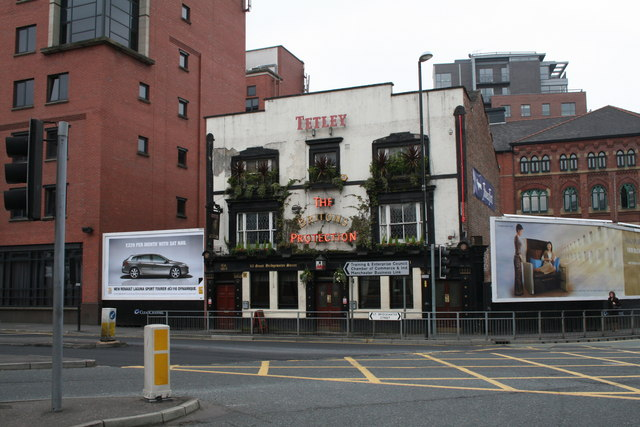
The pub in 2008, as a Tetley's house

For many years the pub was operated as a Tetley house, later passing to Punch Taverns, before being taken over by an independent operator in 2014 and refurbished. It was voted Best Pub in Manchester in the Pride of Manchester Awards in both 2008–2009 and 2009–2010. Alongside real ale, it is also known for offering more than 360 whiskies. As of June 2026, the pub's freehold was owned by Heineken UK.

In March 2022, a planning application was submitted for Apex Tower, a 26‑storey residential scheme proposed immediately beside the Briton's Protection, prompting concerns about overshadowing of the pub's beer garden. The plans also included a smaller seven‑storey block between the pub and Jurys Inn (now Leonardo Hotel), public‑realm works at the Albion Street junction, and a Peterloo‑themed mural intended to acknowledge the pub's history. Following consultation, the tower's layout was adjusted to preserve views of the pub from the west, and the developer stated that any additional shading would be minimal. In July 2026, Manchester City Council published a notice confirming that the application had been withdrawn, ending the proposal after sustained objections from both former and current landlords.

== Architecture ==
=== Exterior ===
The building is constructed in red brick, with the ground floor painted and the upper storeys finished in white roughcast, and it has a slate roof. It follows a double‑depth layout with later extensions at the rear, and the front contains a long bar running parallel to the street with a corridor and additional rooms behind. The exterior has three storeys above cellars and a balanced front elevation. The ground floor includes entrances at both ends and in the centre, each framed by pilasters with decorative capitals, and two pairs of windows with altered glazing set beneath a fascia supported by ornamental brackets and a cornice. The upper levels have simple corner pilasters and two wide sash windows on each floor, with a smaller sash window centred on the top storey. The first‑floor windows are taller and have cornices on brackets, while the central top‑floor window has a small detached cornice. The parapet rises higher in the middle, and most of the rear windows have been changed over time.

=== Interior ===
The interior keeps much of the work carried out around 1930. The front bar has a decorative patterned ceiling and a panelled counter with a later structure added above. A corridor from the left‑hand entrance turns behind the servery, where the bar back includes small glazed sash openings for serving into the passage. Another corridor, lined with tiled lower walls, leads to the toilets at the rear. Two back rooms have fixed seating with bell pushes, and the fireplaces are of the same period as the remodelling. The staircase is dog‑legged with twisted balusters, and the toilets retain white glazed brickwork from the 1930s.

== See also ==
- Listed buildings in Manchester-M1
- Listed pubs in Greater Manchester
