= Pride of Manchester Awards =

The Pride Of Manchester Awards competition is voted for annually every January in Manchester, England and was devised by the Pride Of Manchester group of entertainment websites. It celebrates the best in the city from the previous 12 months.

The competition began in 2008, with the majority of awards being decided by members' votes. The only awards not decided by the voting processing, Best Restaurant, Best Hotel, and Best Serviced Apartments were decided by the results of reviews submitted throughout the previous year by the website's readership.

== 2007-08 Winners ==
Pride Of Manchester Awards for Mancunian of the Year - Tony Wilson

Pride Of Manchester Award for Best Album by a Manchester Artist - Puressence - Don't Forget To Remember

Pride Of Manchester Award for Best Movie with a Manchester Connection - Control

Pride Of Manchester Award for Members' Favourite Restaurant - Choice Bar & Restaurant

Restaurants Of Manchester Award for Best Restaurant in Manchester - Chaophraya

ManchesterBars.com Award for Best Bar in Manchester - Odd

ManchesterBars.com Award for Best Pub in Manchester - The Old Nag's Head

ManchesterBars.com Award for Best Cocktail in Manchester - Cloud 23 - Ena Sharples

ManchesterTheatres.com Award for Best Theatre Production in Manchester - Monkey: Journey To The West

Manchester Comedy Guide Award for Best Comedy Show in Manchester - The Producers (musical)

Hotels Of Manchester Award for Best Hotel in Manchester - Arora International Manchester

Hotels Of Manchester Award for Best Serviced Apartments in Manchester - Blue Rainbow Serviced Apartments Whitworth Street

== 2008-09 Winners ==
Pride Of Manchester Awards for Mancunian of the Year - Tom Buckley (awarded by Ryan Giggs, Cristiano Ronaldo and the entire Manchester United first team squad)

Pride Of Manchester Award for Best Album by a Manchester Artist - Elbow - Seldom Seen Kid

Pride Of Manchester Award for Best Movie with a Manchester Connection - Joy Division

Pride Of Manchester Award for Members' Favourite Restaurant - Chaophraya

Restaurants Of Manchester Award for Best Restaurant in Manchester - Michael Caines at Abode

Restaurants Of Manchester Award for Most Family Friendly Restaurant in Manchester - The Olive Press

ManchesterBars.com Award for Best Bar in Manchester - Lammars

ManchesterBars.com Award for Best Pub in Manchester - The Briton's Protection

ManchesterBars.com Award for Best Cocktail in Manchester - Cloud 23 - Ena Sparkles

ManchesterTheatres.com Award for Best Theatre Production in Manchester - Afrika Afrika

Pride Of Manchester Award for Best Venue in Manchester - The Lowry Lyric Theatre

Manchester Comedy Guide Award for Best Comedy Show in Manchester - Jimmy Carr

Hotels Of Manchester Award for Best Hotel in Manchester - City Inn Manchester

Hotels Of Manchester Award for Best Serviced Apartments in Manchester - Key Of A Flat - Mill View Apartment

== 2009-10 Winners ==
Pride Of Manchester Awards for Mancunian of the Year - Carl Tilson

Pride Of Manchester Award for Best Album by a Manchester Artist - Take That - The Greatest Day (The Circus Live)

Pride Of Manchester Award for Best Movie with a Manchester Connection - Slumdog Millionaire

Pride Of Manchester Award for Best Book - Manchester: Looking For The Light Through The Pouring Rain by Kevin Cummins

Pride Of Manchester 'Tom Buckley' Special Recognition Award - Looking for Eric

Pride Of Manchester Award for Members' Favourite Restaurant - Chaophraya

Restaurants Of Manchester Award for Best Restaurant in Manchester - Michael Caines at Abode

Restaurants Of Manchester Award for Most Family Friendly Restaurant in Manchester - The Olive Press

ManchesterBars.com Award for Best Bar in Manchester - Lammars

ManchesterBars.com Award for Best Pub in Manchester - The Briton's Protection

ManchesterBars.com Award for Best Cocktail in Manchester - Cloud 23 - Ena Sparkles

ManchesterTheatres.com Award for Best Theatre Production in Manchester - We Will Rock You

Pride Of Manchester Award for Best Venue in Manchester - The Lowry Lyric Theatre

Manchester Comedy Guide Award for Best Comedy Show in Manchester - Michael McIntyre's Comedy Roadshow

Hotels Of Manchester Award for Best Hotel in Manchester - Velvet Hotel Manchester
