= With You Now =

EP by Ellie Holcomb
- Released: August 19, 2013
- Genre: CCM
- Length: 19:43
- Label: Good Time

Ellie Holcomb chronology
Magnolia EP (2011)	With You Now (2013)	As Sure as the Sun (2014)

With You Now is the second EP and from the Christian singer-songwriter Ellie Holcomb. The EP released on August 19, 2013, by Good Time Records. This EP received commercial success and it garnered a few positive reviews.

== Background ==
The EP released on August 19, 2013, by Good Time Records, and this was her second EP.

== Critical reception ==
Professional ratings
Review scores
Source	Rating
CCM Magazine	4/5 stars
Indie Vision Music	4/5 stars

With You Now received two positive reviews from music critics. At CCM Magazine, Matt Conner rated the album four out of five stars, writing that "the talented songwriter creates beautiful music on her own, and her new EP With You Now is proof positive." Jonathan Andre of Indie Vision Music rated the album four stars, stating that "Ellie’s EP is a fresh, invigorating, unique and encouraging precursor to what listeners can expect come February next year."

== Commercial performance ==
For the Billboard charting week of September 7, 2013, With You Now was the No. 7 most sold album on the Christian Albums chart.

== Track listing ==
No.	Title	Writer(s)	Length
1.	"With You Now"	Ellie Holcomb, Jillian Edwards	3:19
2.	"I Place My Hope"	Holcomb, Ben Bannister	4:01
3.	"May the Words"	Holcomb, Brown Bannister, Anthony Skinner	3:10
4.	"Can't Outrun Your Love"	Holcomb, Nicole Whitt	2:19
5.	"He Will Give the Weary Strength"	Holcomb	3:09
6.	"We Shall Always Be With the Lord"	Brown Bannister	3:45
Total length:			19:43

== Charts ==
Chart (2013)	Peak position
US Christian Albums (Billboard)	7
