= Xombie =

Xombie may refer to:

- Xombies, a 2004 zombie novel by Walter Greatshell
- Xombie (comics), series of Flash cartoons and comics produced by James Farr
- Xombie (rocket), rocket created by Masten Space Systems
- Xombie (band), hip hop / heavy metal band

== See also ==
- Xombi, DC Comics character
- Zombie (disambiguation)
