= As Sure as the Sun =

Studio album by Ellie Holcomb
- Released: February 18, 2014
- Recorded: 2013
- Studios: The Beehive and The Trophy Room (Nashville, Tennessee); Townsend Sound (Franklin, Tennessee)
- Genre: Contemporary Christian music
- Length: 38:43
- Label: Full Heart (independent)
- Producers: Brown Bannister, Ben Shive

Ellie Holcomb chronology
With You Now (2013)	As Sure as the Sun (2014)	Red Sea Road (2017)

As Sure as the Sun is the debut studio album from the Christian singer and songwriter Ellie Holcomb. The album released on February 18, 2014, by Full Heart Music, which is her own independent label. The album was produced by her father noted Christian music producer Brown Bannister along with Ben Shive. This album has received critical acclaim from music critics and it attained significant commercial sales.

== Critical reception ==
Professional ratings
Review scores
Source	Rating
AllMusic	4/5 stars
CCM Magazine	5/5 stars
Christian Music Review	4/5 stars
Christian Music Zine	4.5/5 stars
Cross Rhythms	9/10 squares
Indie Vision Music	4/5 stars
Jesus Freak Hideout	4/5 stars
Jesus Wired	8/10 stars
Louder Than the Music	5/5 stars
New Release Tuesday	4.5/5 stars
Worship Leader	4.5/5 stars

As Sure as the Sun garnered critical acclaim from fourteen music critics ratings and reviews. David Jeffries of AllMusic rated the album four stars out of five, remarking that the release is "A superb, often stunning, debut." At CCM Magazine, Matt Conner rated the album a perfect five stars, writing that the release "is a beautiful triumphant album that will undoubtedly stand as this years favorites." Amanda Furbeck of Worship Leader rated the album four-and-a-half stars out of five, stating that the release comes with "an uplifting, light-hearted acoustic feel, gently blurring the lines between light pop and country styles" on which "features hope-filled vocals, a hint of country/bluegrass instrumentation, and pop-styled piano riffs." Chris Webb remarks for Cross Rhythms that "This is an album of variation, light and shade, grayscale and colour, a warm welcome into the world of Elllie Holcomb."

At Indie Vision Music, Jonathan Andre rated the album four stars out of five, saying that "Each song, while not necessarily as pop or rock as many songs are on the radio, still speaks volumes of truths to us as we hear it." Kevin Davis of New Release Tuesday rated the album four-and-a-half stars out of five, writing that "This is truly a great album and a moving and prayerful worship experience" on which contains "captivating and catchy songs filled with inspirational lyrics." At Christian Music Review, Amanda Brogan rated the album four stars out of five, stating that Holcomb "shines" on "a wonderfully positive alternative for those who already enjoy the southern-styled genre and holds words of undeniable life even for those who would generally choose a different form of music." Joshua Andre of Christian Music Zine rated the album four-and-a-half stars out of five, calling this a "stellar effort, and near flawless arrangements of quality treasures" to behold.

At Jesus Freak Hideout, they have three reviews on the album, and all were four stars out of five, from Jen Rose, Mark Geil and Roger Gelwicks. Rose states that the album is not one demanding "attention" nor a "groundbreaking" effort, however on the release Holcomb "uses [...] her raw writing material" to create tracks, which "have a way of gently sneaking into your heart after a while." Geil writes that due to the usage of a contemporary vocal style that could be a setback for the album, yet he notes "Few will be bothered by it, but the affectation is really unnecessary and seems to distract from the sweet purity in the vocal underneath. Regardless, this is one fine album!" Gelwicks says that "there is a sense of harmonic completeness that keeps the project afloat from beginning to end; it's rootsy and home-grown, but it's polished, attractive, and above all, worshipful."

Louder Than the Music's Jono Davies rated the album a perfect five stars, and according to him "There is a clean, fresh sound to these songs which make you feel this isn't just an artist copying another artist, this is Ellie singing her stories and her feelings on one amazing album." At Jesus Wired, Jessica Morris rated the album eight out of ten stars, affirming that Holcomb "does not disappoint" because the release contains "stunning vocal control and truthful lyrics". Timothy Yap at Hallels gave a positive review of the album, remarking that "Ultimately, there are songs that entertain and there are songs that transform via Scripture", and this release marks a rarity because the listener "will get both on one record." At The Sound Opinion, Andrew Greenhalgh gave a positive review of the album, noting that the album is not one that is revolutionary, but it is a release "that is warm and honest in every way".

== Awards and accolades ==
The album was No. 5 on the Worship Leader's Top 5 Community Funded and Indie Releases of 2014 list.

== Commercial performance ==
For the Billboard charting week of March 8, 2014, As Sure as the Sun was the No. 34 most sold album in the entirety of the United States via the Billboard 200 placement, and it was the No. 2 most sold album on the Christian Albums chart. In addition, the album was the No. 7 most sold of the Independent Albums.

== Track listing ==
Tracklist
No.	Title	Writer(s)	Scripture(s) utilized	Length
1.	"As Sure as the Sun"	Ellie Holcomb, Rusty Varenkamp	Hosea 6:3 and Lamentations 3:21-24	3:23
2.	"Marvelous Light"	Holcomb, Varenkamp	1 Peter 2:9	3:11
3.	"The Broken Beautiful"	Holcomb, Matt Armstrong	Isaiah 61:1-4 and Psalm 30:11	2:46
4.	"My Portion and My Strength"	Holcomb	Psalm 73:21-26	3:39
5.	"Night Song"	Holcomb, Christa Wells, Nicole Witt	Psalm 42:8	4:17
6.	"Love Never Fails"	Holcomb, Varenkamp	1 Corinthians 13	3:29
7.	"Love Broke Through"	Holcomb, Armstrong	Psalm 30 and Colossians 1:13-20	3:53
8.	"Only Hope I've Got"	Holcomb, Varenkamp, Witt	Psalm 130:3-7	3:22
9.	"The Valley"	Holcomb	Psalm 23 and Psalm 69:1-17	3:48
10.	"Song of Deliverance"	Holcomb, Jillian Edwards	Psalm 32:6-7 and Hosea 6:1	4:00
11.	"I Want to Be Free"	Holcomb	Galatians 5:1 and John 8:36	2:55
Total length:				38:43

== Personnel ==
The music was recorded during 2013 at The Beehive and The Trophy Room in Nashville, Tennessee and at Townsend Sound in nearby Franklin, Tennessee.

Musicians

- Ellie Holcomb – lead vocals, backing vocals, acoustic guitar
- Ben Shive – keyboards, acoustic piano, dulcimer, programming, additional backing vocals (2)
- Nathan Dugger – acoustic guitar, electric guitars, banjo, lap steel guitar, mandolin
- Mike Payne – guitars (6)
- Matt Pierson – bass
- Will Sayles – drums, percussion
- Melissa Broadwell – additional backing vocals (2, 3, 7)
- Danny Oertli – additional backing vocals (2)
- Jillian Edwards – additional backing vocals (4)
- Nicole Witt – additional backing vocals (5)
- Brown Bannister – additional backing vocals (6)
- Drew Holcomb – additional backing vocals (9)

Production

- Brown Bannister – producer, engineer
- Ben Shive – producer, engineer
- Buckley Miller – engineer
- Shane D. Wilson – mixing
- Justin Dowse – mix assistant
- Lani Crump – mix coordinator
- David McNair – mastering
- Jon Dicus – art direction, design
- Darius Fitzgerald – photography

== Chart performance ==
Chart (2014)	Peak position
US Billboard 200	34
US Top Christian Albums (Billboard)	2
US Independent Albums (Billboard)	7
