= Solid State Recital =

2011 studio album by Puressence

Studio album by Puressence
- Released: 2 May 2011
- Genre: Alternative rock, indie rock
- Label: Caserta Red Records

Puressence chronology
Sharpen Up the Knives (2009)	Solid State Recital (2011)

Solid State Recital is the fifth studio album from Puressence. It was also their last album as they split two years after its release and associated tour. The album features Judy Collins on two tracks after she became friendly with the band when James Mudriczki covered her song Che for a tribute album to her.

== Track listing ==
1. "Swathes of Sea Made Stone"
2. "Burma"
3. "When Your Eyes Close"
4. "Cape of No Hope (Water's Edge)"
5. "Majesterial"
6. "Solid State"
7. "Raise Me to the Ground"
8. "In Harm's Way"
9. "Another World"
10. "Our Number's Oracle"

== Lineup ==
=== Musicians ===
- James Mudriczki – vocals
- Lowell Killen – guitar
- Kevin Matthews – bass
- Anthony Szuminski – drums
- Judy Collins – vocals on tracks 1 & 3
