= Sharpen Up the Knives =

Compilation album by Puressence
- Released: 19 October 2009
- Genre: Alternative rock, indie rock
- Length: 64:09
- Label: Caserta Red Records
- Producer: Various

Puressence chronology
| Don't Forget to Remember (2007) | Sharpen Up the Knives (2009) | Solid State Recital (2011) |

Sharpen Up the Knives is a compilation album by the English alternative rock band Puressence. The album's track listing consists mostly of tracks from their Island period, with some unreleased tracks including Che which singer James Mudriczki recorded for a Judy Collins tribute album.

== Track listing ==
1. "This Feeling" – 3:03
2. "Standing in Your Shadow" – 5:15
3. "All I Want" – 3:11
4. "It Doesn't Matter Anymore" – 3:59
5. "How Does it Feel" – 3:07
6. "She's Gotten Over You" – 3:36
7. "Raise Me to the Ground" – 5:54
8. "Walking Dead" – 3:24
9. "Street Lights" – 3:23
10. "I Suppose" – 4:15
11. "Sharpen Up the Knives" – 4:06
12. "Never be the Same Again" – 3:51
13. "India" – 6:04
14. "Our Number's Oracle" – 6:19
15. "Che" – 4:42

== Personnel ==
=== Musicians ===
- James Mudriczki – vocals
- Neil McDonald – guitar (tracks 1–6, 8–13)
- Lowell Killen – guitar (tracks 7 & 14)
- Kevin Matthews – bass
- Anthony Szuminski – drums
