= Don't Forget to Remember (album) =

Don't Forget To Remember

Studio album by Puressence
- Released: 24 September 2007
- Genre: Alternative rock, indie rock
- Length: 40:54
- Label: Reaction Records
- Producer: Andy MacPherson

Puressence chronology
Planet Helpless (2002)	Don't Forget To Remember (2007)	Sharpen Up the Knives (2009)

Professional ratings
Review scores
Source	Rating
NME	5/10 stars

Don't Forget to Remember is the fourth album by the English alternative rock band Puressence which was released on 24 September 2007.

== Track listing ==
1. "Moonbeam" – 3:53
2. "Don't Forget to Remember" – 5:03
3. "Drop Down to Earth" – 3:11
4. "Don't Know Any Better" – 3:31
5. "Life Comes Down Hard" – 3:25
6. "Bitter Pill" – 5:30
7. "Brainwaves" – 4:14
8. "Palisades" – 3:53
9. "Sold Unseen" – 3:47
10. "Burns Inside" – 4:27

== Personnel ==
=== Musicians ===
- James Mudriczki – vocals
- Lowell Killen – guitar
- Kevin Matthews – bass
- Anthony Szuminski – drums
