= Duda (footballer, born 1988) =

Brazilian footballer

Personal information
- Full name: Carlos Eduardo Schneider
- Date of birth: 22 September 1988 (age 38)
- Position: Forward

Youth career
- 2006–2007: Internacional

Senior career*
Years	Team	Apps	(Gls)
2009–2011	Giulianova	39	(10)
Total		5	(2)
- * Club domestic league appearances and goals

Carlos Eduardo Schneider known as Duda (nickname of Eduardo; born 22 September 1988) is a Brazilian footballer.

== Biography ==
Duda started his career at Internacional. He signed a 1-year professional contract in 2006. However, he did not made a debut for Inter. In 2009, he left for Giulianova of Italian Lega Pro Prima Divisione, as he has a reported Italian passport, which not blocked by FIGC non-EU policy. (Despite Schneider is a German surname) He only made handful starts in 2009–10 season.

In 2011, he was released by Giulianova.
