= Undead (disambiguation) =

Undead is a collective name for supernatural entities that are deceased yet behave as if alive.

Undead or The Undead may also refer to:

== Fictional characters ==
- Undead (Dungeons & Dragons), a classification of monsters in Dungeons & Dragons
- Undead (Kamen Rider), a race of monsters in the TV series Kamen Rider Blade
- Undead (Warhammer), an army of monsters in Warhammer games
- Undead, a type of character in Heroscape
- Skeleton (undead), undead manifested as skeletons

== Film ==
- The Undead (film), a 1957 horror film directed by Roger Corman
- Undead (film), a 2003 horror comedy film

== Music ==
- Undead (Six Feet Under album), 2012
- Undead (Tad Morose album), or the title song, 2000
- Undead (Ten Years After album), 1968
- "Undead" (Hollywood Undead song), 2008
- "Undead" (Yoasobi song), 2024
- "Undead", a song by the Haunted from The Haunted, 1998
- "Undead", a song by Sadus from Illusions, 1988
- The Undead, an American horror punk band, or a 1995 album by the band

== Other uses ==
- Undead (series), a series of vampire romance novels by MaryJanice Davidson
- Undead (board game), a 1981 game from Steve Jackson Games
- Undead (Mayfair Games), a 1986 supplement for fantasy role-playing games published by Mayfair Games
