= Zombie (magazine) =

Israeli newspaper

Zombie was an Israeli youth-oriented video gaming magazine that was published from 1994 to 1997. Around 35 issues were released.
