= Zumbi (footballer) =

Brazilian footballer

Personal information
- Full name: Carlos Eduardo da Silva
- Date of birth: September 7, 1980 (age 46)
- Place of birth: Matelândia-PR, Brazil
- Height: 1.81 m (5 ft 11 in)
- Position: Striker

Youth career
- –: União (MT)
- –: Sampdoria

Senior career*
| Years | Team | Apps | (Gls) |
| 1999–2000 | União (MT) | | |
| 2001 | Sport | | |
| 2002 | Olaria | | |
| 2003–2004 | Vila Aurora | 27 | (21) |
| 2004–2005 | Marítimo | 3 | (0) |
| 2004–2005 | Marítimo B | 12 | (4) |
| 2005 | Vila Aurora | | |
| 2006 | Marília (SP) | | |
| 2006 | Paraná Clube | | |
| 2007 | Nacional (AM) | | |
| 2008 | Vila Aurora | | |
| 2008 | Santa Helena | | |
| 2009 | União (MT) | | |
| 2010 | Mixto | | |
| 2011 | Rondonópolis | | |
- * Club domestic league appearances and goals

Carlos Eduardo da Silva or simply Zumbi (born 7 September 1980) is a Brazilian former football striker.

== Career ==
Born in Matelândia, Zumbi played professional football for twelve years with União (MT), Sport Club do Recife, Olária (RJ), Marília (SP), Paraná Clube and Rondonópolis Esporte Clube. As a youth, he played in Italian club U.C. Sampdoria's youth system.

In 2004, he led the Campeonato Mato-Grossense in scoring with 21 goals in 27 matches for Vila Aurora. This led to a move to Primeira Liga side Marítimo at age 25, but after failing to settle, he returned to Vila Aurora in 2005.
