= Matelândia =

Coordinates: 25°15′S 53°59′W

- Municipality
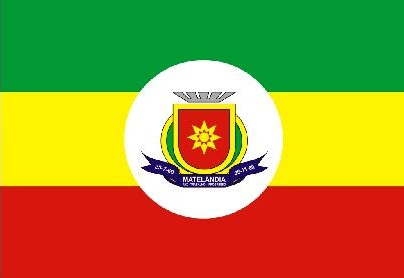
- Flag
- Interactive map of Matelândia
- Country: Brazil
- Region: Southern
- State: Paraná
- Mesoregion: Oeste Paranaense

Population (2020)
  - Total: 18,107
- Time zone: UTC−3 (BRT)

Matelândia is a municipality in the state of Paraná in the Southern Region of Brazil.

== See also ==
- List of municipalities in Paraná
