= Zombi (1986 video game) =

1986 video game

- Cover art depicting a screenshot of the game's title screen
- Developer: Ubi Soft
- Publisher: Ubi Soft
- Designer: Patrick Daher
- Programmer: Yannick Cadin
- Platforms: Amstrad CPC, Amiga, Atari ST, Commodore 64, MS-DOS, ZX Spectrum
- Release: Amstrad CPC: EU: 1986; Other versions: EU: 1990
- Genre: Action-adventure
- Mode: Single-player

Zombi is an action-adventure video game for the Amstrad CPC. It was published in 1986 as the first game from Ubisoft. Zombi was programmed by Yannick Cadin and S. L. Coemelck, with graphics by Patrick Daher and music by Philippe Marchiset. Ports to Amiga, Commodore 64, MS-DOS, and ZX Spectrum were released in 1990.

== Gameplay ==
A first-person action adventure, it borrows heavily from the George A. Romero film Dawn of the Dead (which itself was released under the title Zombi in some European territories) being set in a zombie-filled shopping mall blocked in by articulated trucks. The player controls four protagonists exploring the mall. If a character's health is depleted, he turns into a zombie, which then roams the room they died in. Zombies can be killed either by numerous body shots or a single shot to the head. Characters are named after the creators of the game.

== Ports ==
The game was re-released in 1990, with ports developed for the ZX Spectrum (by Geoff Phillips, Chris Jones and Steve Chance), Commodore 64 (Jean Noel Moyne, Laurent Poujoulat, Jean Francois Auroux), Amiga (Alexander Yarmitsky), Atari ST and MS-DOS (Yannick Cadin).

== Legacy ==
Another Ubisoft title ZombiU was release for the Wii U in 2012 and later ported to the PlayStation 4 and Xbox One in 2015. It is debated whether or not this game is a remake/reboot of the original.

== Reception ==
Reception

Award
Publication	Award
Computer and Video Games	C+VG Hit

The ZX Spectrum version was awarded 87% by Sinclair User magazine and 77% by Your Sinclair, both reviewers were impressed with the immersive atmosphere.

CU Amiga awarded the Amiga version of the game 85%, whilst German magazine Amiga Joker scored it at 69%.

Zzap!64 awarded the Commodore 64 version of the game 72%. The reviewer said that the gameplay is outdated and is very similar to Catch 23, a 1987 ZX Spectrum game.

== See also ==
- ZombiU, a similarly titled 2012 game from Ubisoft
