= Carlos Eduardo Moreira Ferreira =

Brazilian businessman and politician (1939–2022)

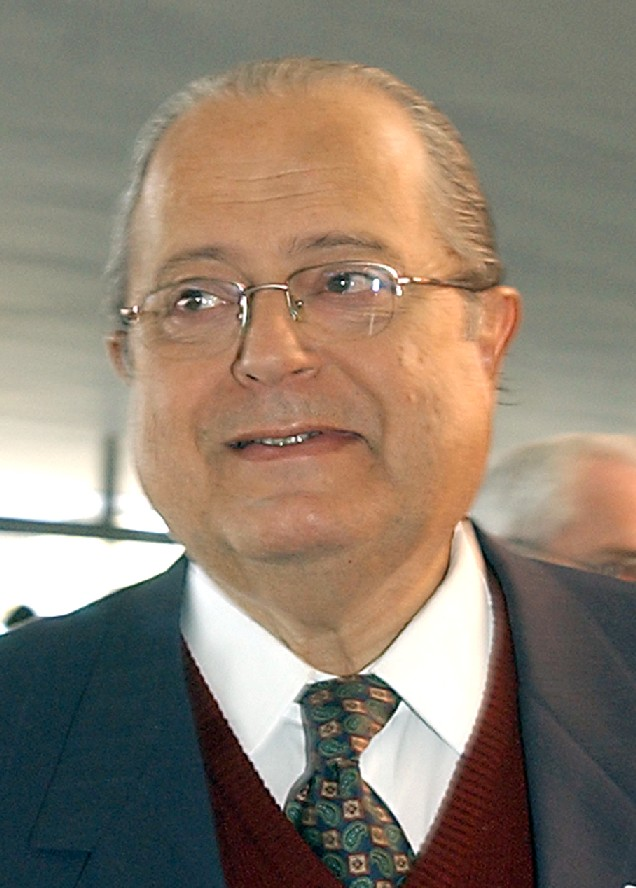
- Ferreira in 2006

President of the Confederação Nacional da Indústria
- In office 2002–2006
- Preceded by: Fernando Bezerra
- Succeeded by: Armando Monteiro

Member of the Chamber of Deputies of Brazil
- In office 1999–2003

Personal details
- Born: 9 March 1939 São Paulo, Brazil
- Died: 1 May 2022 (aged 83) São Paulo, Brazil
- Party: PFL
- Education: University of São Paulo
- Occupation: Businessman

Carlos Eduardo Moreira Ferreira (9 March 1939 – 1 May 2022) was a Brazilian businessman and politician. A member of the Liberal Front Party, he served as president of the Confederação Nacional da Indústria from 2002 to 2006. He died in São Paulo on 1 May 2022 at the age of 83.
