= Puressence =

English rock band

- Origin: Failsworth, Greater Manchester, England
- Genres: Alternative rock; indie rock
- Years active: 1991–2013; 2024–present
- Labels: Island; 2 Damn Loud; Reaction; Caserta Red
- Members: James Mudriczki; Kevin Matthews; Tony Szuminski; Lowell Killen (2003–)
- Past members: Neil McDonald (1991–2003)
- Website: puressenceofficial.com

Puressence are an English indie rock band, formed in 1991 in Failsworth, Greater Manchester.

== History ==
James Mudriczki, Neil McDonald, Anthony Szuminski and Kevin Matthews met on a bus on their way to watch The Stone Roses play at Spike Island on 27th May 1990.

Through much practice their music developed and they decided on the name 'Presence'. Their first gig as a band was at the 701 Club in their hometown of Failsworth, Greater Manchester on 23rd February 1991.

The band later settled on the name Puressence. A name instantly identified by most Mancunians in the early 1990s for the paper letters 'P'-'U'-'R'-'E'-'S'-'S'-'E'-'N'-'C'-'E', which were plastered around Manchester city centre, on derelict buildings, and on bridges (the most notable being the railway bridge opposite the Haçienda). Manchester independent record label 2 Damn Loud released two singles and there was a further single with Rough Trade Singles Club. The band played a series of gigs at Manchester's In The City festival early in the 1990s.

The big breakthrough came a couple of years later, when the band signed to Island Records.

Their debut album Puressence was released on 29th April 1996. The album spawned five singles. Regular touring around the UK and Europe was followed by their second album Only Forever in 1998, which reached the UK top 40 and spawned the chart hit ‘This Feeling’. This helped the band appear on television programmes such as TFI Friday and Soccer AM. BBC Radio 1 DJ Simon Mayo made this his single of the week and it received airplay on numerous radio stations around the UK.

Planet Helpless was released in 2002 and was a huge success in Greece, reaching number 4 in the album charts. The official video for the top 40 single ‘Walking Dead’ featured Mani (The Stone Roses / Primal Scream) and Bez (Happy Mondays), the song also featured on Sky Sports and in the video game Hitman. Puressence toured this album in Greece with huge shows supporting Suede and Iggy Pop.

In August 2003, after more than ten years with Puressence, guitarist and founder member McDonald left the band and has since gone on to form the band Juno Ashes. He was replaced by Lowell Killen, who is originally from the Isle of Man. He has played in other bands and left Manchester band Dry Riser to join Puressence.

In 2004, the band played at The Witchwood in Ashton-under-Lyne.

In 2006, the band released a single titled "Palisades" on new Manchester label Reaction, followed by an album, Don't Forget To Remember, in September 2007. This attracted interest in America and was chosen to launch the new iTunes homepage. Within a week the album had entered the Top 30 outselling the likes of Foo Fighters and Led Zeppelin.

On 10 and 11 September 2008 Puressence played their first shows in the US. The first was at the Mercury Lounge in New York City. The next night they played the Apple Store in SoHo. The opening song at the Mercury Lounge was "I Suppose". They passed out free CD singles of "Don't Know Any Better" to many fans around the United States.

In Autumn 2009, the band released a ‘best of’ compilation Sharpen Up the Knives and played their largest ever UK gig in front of 3,500 people at the Apollo in Manchester. They also supported Depeche Mode in Greece.

A final album was released on Caserta Red Records on 21st April 2011. Solid State Recital. Legendary American singer/songwriter Judy Collins sang on the album after Mudriczki covered one of her songs for a tribute album.

On 27 November 2013, Puressence announced they had split.

Since the split, James Mudriczki had been working on a solo album whilst contributing vocals to two tracks on The Red-Sided Garter Snakes 2015 album, Endless Sea. In 2015, it was announced that Mudriczki has formed a new band called The Nihilists. The line up includes Mudriczki on vocals, Steven Kelly on guitars and programming and John Patterson who is the drummer and multi instrumentalist.

On 20 November 2023, 10 years after their split, the band announced on their Facebook page that their first concert in 11 years. Puressence would be playing Albert Hall in Manchester in June 2024. The gig sold out within minutes of the tickets going on sale.

In December 2024, Puressence returned to Greece to play their second successive sold out show of their comeback at Floyd in Athens.

== Early singles (1992–93) ==
Prior to releasing these albums, Puressence released two singles and an EP. First the double A-side "Siamese" / "Scapa Flow" was released through Rough Trade. Then followed the EPs Petrol Skin and Offshore, both released through 2 Damn Loud Records.

- "Siamese" (Rough Trade) June 1992
1. "Siamese"
2. "Scapa Flow"
- Petrol Skin EP (2 Damn Loud Records) 6 July 1992
1. "Telekenesis"
2. "Suck The Knife"
3. "Polystyrene Snow"
4. "Petrol Skin"
- Offshore EP (2 Damn Loud) 19 April 1993
1. "Offshore"
2. "None Handed (demo)"
3. "Mist"

Toby Chalmers of Island Records offered them a recording contract. Support slots to Marion introduced them to new supporters.

== Albums ==
=== Puressence (1996) ===
In May 1995, the band released the "I Suppose" single on Island without chart success. A few months later they returned with the "Fire" single, which again failed to sell. The tracks though did herald Puressence's self-titled debut album.

The album also produced three more singles, "India", "Traffic Jam in Memory Lane" and "Casting Lazy Shadows." (The album only contained ten tracks, of which they had released five as singles.)

Released: April 1996

=== Only Forever (1998) ===
The album displayed a shift in Puressence's style. Mani, bassist for the Stone Roses and Primal Scream, appeared as record producer on "Standing in Your Shadow."

"This Feeling" proved to be a hit for the band, when it reached number 33 in the UK Singles Chart, helping the band appear on television programmes such as TFI Friday and Soccer AM. BBC Radio 1 DJ Simon Mayo made this his single of the week and it received airplay on numerous radio stations around the UK. The second single "It Doesn't Matter Anymore" fell just short of the Top 40. But the third single "All I Want" scraped in at No. 39, its second CD was joined as a double A-side with "Never Be The Same Again".

The album peaked in the UK Albums Chart at No. 36.

=== Don't Know Any Better - Anthology (1992–2000) ===
Don’t Know Any Better Anthology is an unofficial Puressence release. The collection was compiled by fans of the band and distributed over the Internet.

Contains:
Emotion, Petrol Skin, Mist, Scapa Flow, Siamese, Telekinesis, Suck The Knife, Fifteen Years, Bright Star,
Black Snow, All Star, Moss Side Lonely, Only Holy Maybe, Let Down, Offshore, and many more.

This collection contains more than 70 songs, studio versions, demos or live rarities from radio.

=== Planet Helpless (2002) ===
Planet Helpless peaked in the UK Albums Chart at No. 81, it did enjoy success in Greece (No. 4 in the albums chart) and heralded a number of gigs, mainly in Manchester. Puressence chose to sack their manager and leave Island Records in February 2002.

Planet Helpless, due to the ongoing problems with the record company, released only one single. "Walking Dead" gave the band its third Top 40 hit. The video included Mani and Bez (Happy Mondays).

=== Don't Forget to Remember (2007) ===
Puressence's fourth album, entitled Don't Forget To Remember, was recorded at Revolution studios in Manchester and produced by Andy Macpherson.

The album was released on 24 September 2007. Despite failing to chart, the album beat off more high-profile releases to be voted 'Best Album by a Manchester Artist' in the Pride of Manchester Awards 2008. The album was then chosen by US iTunes to launch their new homepage feature, 'Editors Choice' in February 2008. Within a week the album entered US iTunes' Top 40. Puressence played a Manchester Academy show to celebrate English Rugby and Soccer team wins on 13 October 2007.

The album was also a success in Greece; remaining in the Top 10 for several weeks.
Originally appearing as a soft release in 2007, it was announced that Don't Forget to Remember got a wide release on 16 June.

The album peaked in the UK Albums Chart at No. 176.

Released: 24 September 2007
Revolution studios

=== Sharpen Up the Knives (2009) ===
Released: in mid-October 2009
Sharpen Up the Knives was a fifteen track album collection consisting of singles, album tracks and a couple of new recordings.

=== Solid State Recital (2011) ===
Track listing:

1. Swathes Of Sea Made Stone
2. Burma
3. When Your Eyes Close
4. Cape Of No Hope (Water's Edge)
5. Majesterial
6. Solid State
7. Raise Me To The Ground
8. In Harm's Way
9. Another World
10. Our Number's Oracle

Released: 2 May 2011
Caserta Red

== Line-up and label changes ==
In August 2003, after more than 12 years with Puressence, guitarist and founding member McDonald left the band. He was replaced by Lowell Killen. Puressence decided to leave Island Records and sign with a new Manchester label called Reaction. They played many gigs throughout 2003 in support of the album Planet Helpless. In the summer of 2003 they also played in The Move Festival in Manchester's Old Trafford Cricket Ground. They followed this up by supporting Suede, Iggy Pop and Depeche Mode in Greece. Puressence have now set up their own label calling it Caserta Red Records.

== Band membership ==
The band consist of:

- James Mudriczki: Vocals
- Lowell Killen: Guitar
- Kevin Matthews: Bass guitar
- Tony Szuminski: Drums / percussion

== Discography ==
=== Studio albums ===
Date	Album	UK Albums Chart	Greece Albums Chart
1996	Puressence	-	-
1998	Only Forever	36	-
2002	Planet Helpless	81	4
2007	Don't Forget to Remember	176	7
2009	Sharpen Up the Knives	-	4
2011	Solid State Recital	-	-

=== Singles ===
Year	Song	UK Singles Chart	UK Indie singles	Album
1992	"Siamese" / "Scapa Flow"	-	-	-
1992	"Petrol Skin EP"	-	-	Petrol Skin EP
1993	"Offshore"	-	-	-
1995	"I Suppose"	190	-	Puressence
1995	"Fire"	99	-	Puressence
1996	"India"	98	-	Puressence
1996	"Traffic Jam in Memory Lane"	95	-	Puressence
1996	"Casting Lazy Shadows"	82	-	Puressence
1998	"This Feeling"	33	-	Only Forever
1998	"It Doesn't Matter Anymore"	47	-	Only Forever
1998	"All I Want"	39	-	Only Forever
1998	"All I Want" / "Never Be the Same Again"	39	-	Only Forever
2002	"Walking Dead"	40	-	Planet Helpless
2006	"Palisades" / "Moonbeam"	106	5	Don't Forget to Remember
2007	"Drop Down to Earth"	56	-	Don't Forget to Remember
2008	"Don't Know Any Better"	109	-	Don't Forget to Remember

== Song appearances ==
- "Standing in Your Shadow" featured in the end titles of the British crime film, Face.
- "Walking Dead" is in the Eidos video game, Hitman: Contracts.
- "Make Time" was used in the Dennis Hopper film, Out of Season.
- "Walking Dead" was used for a while by Sky Sports in 2005. It was background music when the football scores were being read at the end of the night after screening live premiership games.
- "This Feeling" was also used by Sky Sports for their "Premiership Years" review of the 1998–99 season and in 1999-00
