= Dead Man Walking (John Tibbs album) =

Studio album by John Tibbs
- Released: February 5, 2016
- Genres: Southern rock, heartland rock, Contemporary Christian music, folk, Christian rock, folk rock, roots rock, country gospel, americana
- Length: 33:54
- Labels: Fair Trade, Columbia
- Producer: Ben Shive

John Tibbs chronology
Dead Man Walking EP (2015)	Dead Man Walking (2016)

Dead Man Walking is the first studio album from John Tibbs. Fair Trade Services alongside Columbia Records released the album on February 5, 2016. Tibbs worked with Ben Shive, in the production of this album.

== Critical reception ==
Professional ratings
Review scores
Source	Rating
365 Days of Inspiring Media	4/5 stars
CCM Magazine	4/5 stars
The Christian Beat	4/5 stars
Jesus Freak Hideout	4.5/5 stars
New Release Today	3.5/5 stars

Andy Argyrakis, allocating the album a four star review from CCM Magazine, says, "the troubadour sounds crystal clear as his voice sturdily switches from pleading to smooth to soulful, the latter of which is most evident on the redemptive title track's duet with the enchanting Ellie Holcomb." Awarding the album four and a half stars at Jesus Freak Hideout, Alex Caldwell states, "Dead Man Walking is an excellent, fully formed, rocking debut album that hits on all cylinders and convicts and encourages in equal measure." Mikayla Shriver, rating the album three and a half stars for New Release Today, writes, "With profound lyrics and a unique musical style, John Tibbs' first studio album is worth a listen-- and a second listen-- and many more. This is a promising debut, and it will definitely not be the last we hear from him!" Giving the album four stars from 365 Days of Inspiring Media, Joshua Andre says, "John Tibbs' debut full length album has certainly lived up to the expectations placed upon it by the impressive EP, even though 5 songs are the same." Madeleine Dittmer, allotting the album four stars by The Christian Beat, describes, "The songs on this album contain an energy that surges through John’s music and voice, and are sure to have you singing along...John Tibbs has created a collection of songs full of thought-provoking lyrics and skillful, catchy instrumentation".

== Track listing ==
No.	Title	Length
1.	"Silver in Stone"	3:08
2.	"Abraham"	3:22
3.	"Burn"	3:18
4.	"Anchor"	3:24
5.	"Dead Man Walking" (featuring Ellie Holcomb)	3:07
6.	"Everything I Need"	3:50
7.	"Run Wild"	3:40
8.	"Love Stands Tall"	3:56
9.	"Raining Pouring"	3:05
10.	"Hope"	3:04
Total length:		33:54
