= Only Forever (Puressence album) =

Studio album by Puressence
- Released: 17 August 1998
- Genre: Alternative rock, indie rock
- Length: 47:34
- Label: Island
- Producer: Mike Hedges

Puressence chronology
| Puressence (1996) | Only Forever (1998) | Planet Helpless (2002) |

Professional ratings
Review scores
| Source | Rating |
|---|---|
| Allmusic | link |
| NME | link |
| The Virgin Encyclopedia of Nineties Music | 3/5 stars |
| The Times | 6/10 stars |
| Select | 3/5 stars |
| Melody Maker | 3.5/5 stars |

Only Forever is the second album by English alternative rock band Puressence, released in 1998. Only Forever displayed a clear shift in Puressence's style, It captured the group in a more positive, lighter, chart-friendly mood. The album charted at #36, this was largely thanks to the amount of play that the first single "This Feeling" received including Radio 1 and MTV.

Mani appeared as producer on the song "Standing in Your Shadow".

"Standing in Your Shadow" was used over the credits of the 1997 film Face.

== Track listing ==
All songs written by Mudriczki, Szuminski, Matthews and McDonald.

1. "Sharpen Up the Knives" – 4:04
2. "This Feeling" – 2:59
3. "It Doesn't Matter Anymore" – 4:30
4. "Street Lights" – 3:22
5. "Standing in Your Shadow" – 5:13
6. "All I Want" – 3:09
7. "Behind the Man" – 1:23
8. "Never Be the Same Again" – 3:50
9. "Hey Hey I'm Down" – 4:04
10. "Past Believing" – 3:37
11. "Turn the Lights Out When I Die" – 4:03
12. "Gazing Down" – 7:20

== Personnel ==
=== Musicians ===
- James Mudriczki - vocals
- Neil McDonald - guitar
- Kevin Matthews - bass
- Anthony Szuminski - drums

=== Technical ===
- Mike Hedges - producer and engineer
- Peter Anderson - Photography
