= Drew Holcomb and the Neighbors =

American Americana band

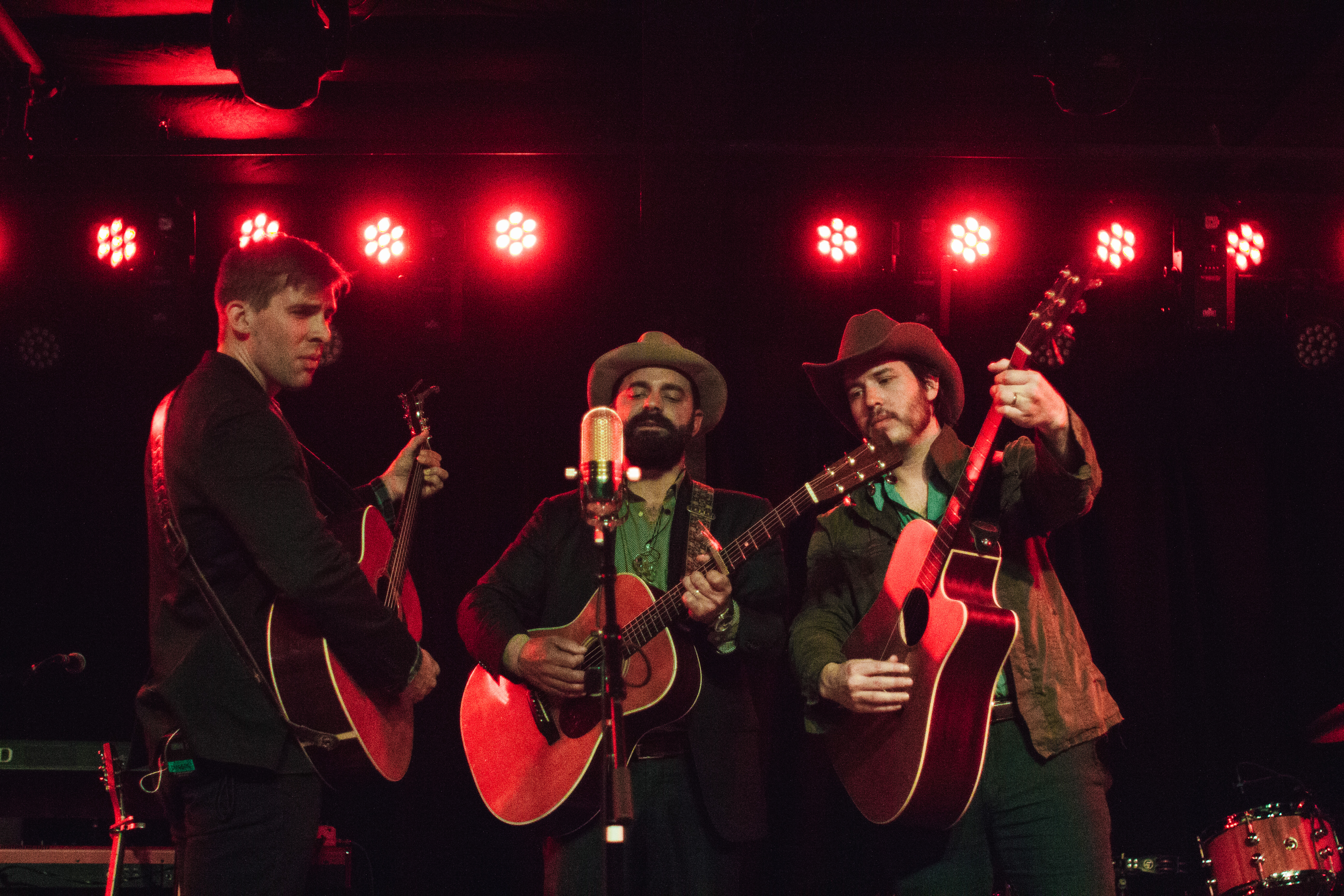
- Drew Holcomb and the Neighbors on stage at The Ready Room in St. Louis, Missouri, April 2016

Background information
- Origin: Memphis, Tennessee; East Nashville, Tennessee
- Genres: Americana; alternative rock; folk rock
- Years active: 2005–present
- Labels: Magnolia Records; Dualtone Records; Good Time Records; Thirty Tigers; Tone Tree Music
- Members: Drew Holcomb; Rich Brinsfield; Nathan Dugger
- Website: drewholcomb.com

Drew Holcomb and the Neighbors is an Americana band from Memphis and East Nashville, Tennessee. The band was formed in 2005 by Drew Holcomb (lead vocals, guitar, harmonica). The other band members are Nathan Dugger (guitar, keys) and Rich Brinsfield playing bass. Holcomb's wife, Ellie Holcomb, who had been a member of the band since 2005, eventually stopped touring with the band to take care of their first child EmmyLou in 2012, and then later began pursuing a solo artist career.

== History ==
=== Early years ===
Drew Holcomb began his musical career as a solo act. In 2003, he recorded his debut EP Lost And Found in his hometown of Memphis, Tennessee. Two years later, Holcomb released the full-length album Washed in Blue, which led to multiple TV placements, including Lifetime's Army Wives, Showtime's United States of Tara, and A&E's The Cleaner.

=== Musical career ===
While attending the University of Tennessee, Holcomb met Ellie Bannister, daughter of producer-songwriter Brown Bannister. The two married in 2006 and live in Nashville. Shortly after their wedding, Drew Holcomb collaborated with Nathan Dugger and Rich Brinsfield to form the band. They then asked Ellie Holcomb to join the band. At the time, they all lived in the same zip code, which was why the band was named "Drew Holcomb and The Neighbors". In August 2008, the band released a 10-track album called Passenger Seat.

In 2009, Holcomb and his band toured heavily, and supported several national acts including Susan Tedeschi, Ryan Adams, Los Lobos, The Avett Brothers, Robert Earl Keen, and Marc Broussard. In late 2009, the band appeared alongside Pat Green, Billy Joe Shaver, and Darryl Worley on the PBS TV show Legends and Lyrics. In 2011, the band partnered with Dualtone Records to create the album Chasing Someday. Released in February 2011, the 13-track album earned Holcomb his first appearance on the "Billboard" charts. Chasing Someday debuted at No. 183 on Billboard 200 as well as other Billboard charts including: No. 3 Billboard Heatseekers, No. 45 on Billboard Overall Digital Albums, No. 19 on Billboard Independent Album Chart, No. 8 on Billboard Folk Albums, and No. 29 on Billboard Rock Albums. The band embarked on the heaviest touring season since its inception, playing over 400 shows for the Chasing Someday cycle and their first sell out performances in venues beyond the Southeastern United States.

Drew Holcomb and the Neighbors have also appeared multiple times at Nashville's free summer music festival, Live on The Green in 2011 and again in 2017. They have made appearances at other festivals across the U.S. including Stagecoach California's Country Music Festival, Carolina in the Fall Music and Food Festival, Lexington, South Carolina's Midsummer Festival, Austin City Limits, and many more.

In February 2013, Drew Holcomb and the Neighbors released their album, Good Light, through their self-owned imprint Magnolia Music and management company's Good Time Records. The 12-song album debuted No. 84 on Billboard Top 200 and landed on several other "Billboard" charts, including: No. 5 on Folk Albums Chart, No. 14 on Independent Albums Chart, and No. 23 on Rock Albums Chart. "Good Light" also peaked at No. 18 on the Americana radio format chart. The band toured heavily, first in direct support for Needtobreathe's US "Drive All Night" Tour, and Drew Holcomb later directly supported John Hiatt's West Coast tour as a solo performer.

Medicine was the 2015 follow-up to Drew Holcomb's 2013 album Good Light, released in January 2015. The album, which is his most successful record to date, debuted at No. 47 on the Billboard 200 along with other Billboard charts: No. 23 on the Top Digital Albums Chart, No. 12 on the Rock Albums Chart, and No. 30 on the Top Current Album Sales. Holcomb co-produced the album with Joe Pisapia and Ellie Holcomb made multiple appearances on the album as well. Holcomb also made an appearance on Late Night TV with Jimmy Kimmel on April 15, 2015, promoting the recent release of the "Medicine" album. They played shows across the U.S., in the UK, and in Ireland with opener, Penny & Sparrow. Throughout the majority of 2015, Holcomb jumped on the first two legs of the Tour de Compadres tour, formed by Needtobreathe and played with Colony House, Ben Rector, and Switchfoot.

The band's first live album, Live at the Ryman, was released in August 2016 under Magnolia Music. The 17-song album debuted No. 5 on Billboard's Folk Album Charts, No. 25 on the Rock Albums Chart, No. 3 on Vinyl Albums Chart, and No. 17 on Independent Albums Chart. They released a new studio album, Souvenir, on March 24, 2017. The 11-song album debuted at No. 117 on the Billboard 200 along with other Billboard charts: No. 3 on Folk Album, No. 17 on Rock Album, No. 3 on Vinyl Albums, and No. 4 on Independent Albums. The album was recorded in East Nashville, with the same producers as the previous album: Joe Pisapia and Ian Fitchuk.

On August 16, 2019, they released Dragons, which includes songs co-written by Lori McKenna, Natalie Hemby, Zach Williams of The Lone Bellow, producer Cason Cooley and Ellie Holcomb. It reached No. 1 on Billboard's Folk Americana Album Sales Chart. Released as a single, "End of the World" reached the Top 40 at AAA and Rolling Stone Country proclaimed Drew as one of Americana's Most Popular Stars in a career-spanning feature in October. Nashville Lifestyles Magazine praised the release, with writer Luke Levenson commenting, "Community and family have always been leitmotifs in Drew Holcomb & The Neighbors' music, but certainly with Dragons, they are being portrayed in a new, endlessly creative, light."

On June 7, 2023, the band released their ninth studio album titled Strangers No More.

== Discography ==
Title	Details	Peak chart positions				
Title	Details	US	US Folk	US Rock	US Heat.	US Indie
Washed in Blue	Release date: May 12, 2005; Label: Istra	—	—	—	—	—
Live from Memphis	Release date: September 27, 2007; Label: Self-released	—	—	—	—	—
A Neighborly Christmas	Release date: December 11, 2007; Label: Magnolia Records	—	—	—	—	—
Passenger Seat	Release date: August 12, 2008; Label: Magnolia Records	—	—	—	—	—
A Million Miles Away	Release date: August 11, 2009; Label: Magnolia Records	—	—	—	—	—
Chasing Someday	Release date: February 8, 2011; Label: Dualtone Records	183	8	39	3	19
Through the Night: Live in the Studio	Release date: June 19, 2012; Label: Magnolia Records	—	—	—	—	—
Another Neighborly Christmas	Release date: November 6, 2012; Label: Magnolia Records	—	—	—	—	—
Good Light	Release date: February 26, 2013; Label: Magnolia Records	84	5	23	—	14
Medicine	Release date: January 27, 2015; Label: Magnolia Records	47	6	12	—	9
Live at the Ryman	Release date: August 16, 2016; Label: Magnolia Records	— (Note: Live at the Ryman did not chart on the Billboard 200, but peaked at No. 89 on the Current Album Sales chart.)	5	25	—	17
Souvenir	Release date: March 24, 2017; Label: Magnolia Records	117	3	17	—	4
Dragons	Release date: August 16, 2019; Label: Magnolia Records / Thirty Tigers	171	3	30	—	5
Strangers No More	Release date: June 7, 2023; Label: Magnolia Records / Tone Tree Music	—	—	—	—	—
"—" denotes releases that did not chart

=== Music videos ===
Year	Title	Director
2009	"Baby It's Cold Outside"	David Poag
2011	"Fire and Dynamite"	Aaron Greenberg
2011	"Live Forever"	David Poag
2011	"Someday"	Aaron Greenberg
2013	"Good Light"	David Poag
2013	"The Wine We Drink"	Konrad Czysrowski
2014	"American Beauty"	Eric Ryan Anderson
2014	"Here We Go"	—N/a
2014	"Tennessee"	—N/a
2015	"Tightrope"	—N/a
2016	"Wild World"	—N/a
2016	"You'll Always Be My Girl"	Lindley Atkinson
2017	"Rowdy Heart, Broken Wing"	—N/a
2019	"End of the World"	Carl Diebold
2019	"Family"	—N/a
