= Puressence (album) =

Studio album by Puressence
- Released: 29 April 1996
- Recorded: 1996 at Angelshare Studios, Clwyd; Chapel Studios, Lincoln; The Cutting Room, Manchester and Monnow Valley, Rockfield
- Genre: Arena rock, shoegazing
- Length: 43:58
- Label: Island
- Producer: Clive Martin

Puressence chronology
Puressence (1996)	Only Forever (1998)

Professional ratings
Review scores
Source	Rating
AllMusic	2.5/5 stars
The Virgin Encyclopedia of Nineties Music	3/5 stars

Puressence is the first album by the English alternative rock band Puressence, released in 1996.

== Critical reception ==
NME wrote that "this magnificent debut album – by turns both plaintive and gutturally anthemic – still stands as a towering miserablist masterpiece."

== Track listing ==
All songs written by Mudriczki, Szuminski, Matthews and McDonald.

1. "Near Distance" – 4:39
2. "I Suppose" – 4:13
3. "Mr Brown" – 5:02
4. "Understanding" – 4:27
5. "Fire" – 4:05
6. "Traffic Jam in Memory Lane" – 3:16
7. "Casting Lazy Shadows" – 3:36
8. "You're Only Trying to Twist My Arm" – 4:27
9. "Every House on Every Street" – 4:03
10. "India" – 6:04

== Personnel ==
=== Musicians ===
- James Mudriczki - vocals
- Neil McDonald - guitar
- Kevin Matthews - bass guitar
- Anthony Szuminski - drums

=== Technical ===
- Clive Martin - producer and engineer
- Peter Anderson - Photography
