= ZombiU =

2012 video game

ZombiU Zombi
- North American cover art of the non-Wii U version
- Developer: Ubisoft Montpellier (Note: Non-Wii U versions developed by Straight Right)
- Publisher: Ubisoft
- Directors: Jean Philippe Caro; Florent Sacré
- Producer: Guillaume Brunier
- Designer: Mounir Radi
- Programmer: François Sauveur
- Artist: Florent Sacré
- Writers: Antony Johnston; Gabrielle Shrager
- Composer: Cris Velasco
- Engine: LyN Engine
- Platforms: Wii U PlayStation 4 Windows; Xbox One
- Release: Wii U: NA: November 18, 2012; PAL: November 30, 2012; PlayStation 4, Windows, Xbox One: WW: August 18, 2015
- Genre: Survival horror
- Modes: Single-player, multiplayer (Note: Only the Wii U version has multiplayer.)

ZombiU is a survival horror game developed by Ubisoft Montpellier and published by Ubisoft. It was released for the Wii U as a launch title in November 2012. Played from a first-person perspective, the player assumes control of a human survivor amid a 2012 zombie apocalypse. Featuring a permadeath system, it uses the Wii U GamePad extensively to scan the environment and maintain the survivor's inventory. The game was released under the name Zombi for PlayStation 4, Windows, and Xbox One in August 2015. The port, handled by Straight Right, added new melee weapons and removed the multiplayer feature.

Ubisoft was approached by Nintendo to develop a mature game for the Wii U. Originally envisioned as a spin-off of the Raving Rabbids franchise and a fast-paced first-person shooter, Killer Freaks from Outer Space (with small, agile monsters), the game was retooled as ZombiU after the development team realized that the Wii U GamePad was suitable for slower-paced games. Many of the game's features, including the GamePad functionality and the permadeath system, went through several iterations. Among other video games, ZombiU was influenced by Resident Evil, Condemned: Criminal Origins and Peter Jackson's King Kong. London was chosen as the game's setting because of its blend of modern and historic architecture and its rich history. Ubisoft Bucharest led development of the game's multiplayer portion.

ZombiU received generally positive reviews from critics, while the game's Zombi version received mixed reviews. Critics praised the game's emphasis on survival horror, atmosphere, and the permadeath system. They had mixed opinions about gameplay, multiplayer, story, and use of the GamePad. Technical problems, such as glitches and load times, were criticized. The game was unprofitable for Ubisoft, prompting it to turn another Wii U exclusive, Rayman Legends, into a multiplatform game. A prototype for a sequel was developed, but was canceled when the game failed financially.

== Gameplay ==
Screenshot of a player wielding a cricket bat against a zombie

In ZombiU, a survival horror game played from a first-person perspective, the player is a survivor of a zombie apocalypse in London. They are contacted by the Prepper, a mysterious figure who tasks them to maintain his safe house in order to be properly prepared for survival in this new destroyed London, all while the survivor seeks out a cure for the infection at the behest of Dr. Knight, a scientist/doctor stationed at Buckingham Palace. The player has a number of ways to deal with enemies, and can confront the zombies with firearms, land mines, and Molotov cocktails. They can use an unbreakable cricket bat, which does less damage than other weapons. There are several types of zombies, including those which explode, are armored, or spill corrosive fluid. The zombies are sensitive to light, and are attracted to a player who is using a flashlight or flare. Sound produced by firearms will also attract nearby enemies to a player, who can push them away with their weapon. The player can also use stealth to avoid being noticed by enemies.

Exploration is encouraged in the game. By exploring the game's world, players can find beds (which are save points) and routes leading them back to their safe house. New weapons, ammunition, and scarce items can be collected by searching areas or dead bodies. These items include food and medkits (which restore health), plywood scraps (used to barricade doors), and weapon parts (which can be used in the safe house to upgrade weapons). As players discover new items during the game, previously-inaccessible areas can be entered. These items are stored in the player character's inventory (known as a bug-out-bag) or a cache in the safe house. If the player's character is killed by a zombie (which can occur with one bite), the character will permanently die and the player will then assume the role of another survivor. The previous character will become a zombie, whom the player must kill to reclaim their inventory. If the Wii U's now-defunct Miiverse service was enabled, other players' characters could also appear as zombies carrying the items they collected. A player could also place symbolic clues and hints, visible to other players, on walls. In addition to the normal-difficulty mode, the game has a "Chicken" mode, which lowers the game's difficulty, for new and inexperienced players, and a survival mode where the game ends when the player's original character dies.

The game's controls make extensive use of the Wii U GamePad. During normal play, the touchscreen manages player inventory and displays a mini-map of the immediate area (indicating the locations of the player and nearby enemies). The touchscreen is also used for context-sensitive actions such as executions, escaping from enemies, and hacking combination locks. The GamePad's gyroscope, which allows the controller to sense its rotation and tilt in three-dimensional space, is also used. While viewing the touchscreen, a player can move the controller to scan different areas to find items. While performing these actions, the television's perspective switches to a fixed third-person view of the player character and the surrounding area. The player is vulnerable to attack in this state, and must watch the GamePad's touchscreen and the television screen in to avoid harm. The Wii U camera allows players to import a face, which will be "zombified", into the game.

ZombiU has three multiplayer modes. In Time Attack mode, players must kill as many zombies as they can in a limited time. In survival mode, players stay alive as long as possible with a limited supply of resources. The results of these two modes will be posted on the game's online leaderboard. The third mode, King of Zombies, is an offline asymmetrical multiplayer mode. A player, using the Wii U Pro Controller, plays a human survivor who must navigate a map to obtain all capture points. Another player, known as King Boris and using the Wii U GamePad with a top-down perspective, must deploy a maximum of 10 zombies to halt the players' progress and capture a flag. A progression system is present, in which the Pro Controller player and the GamePad player unlock more-powerful weapons and different types of zombies.

== Plot ==
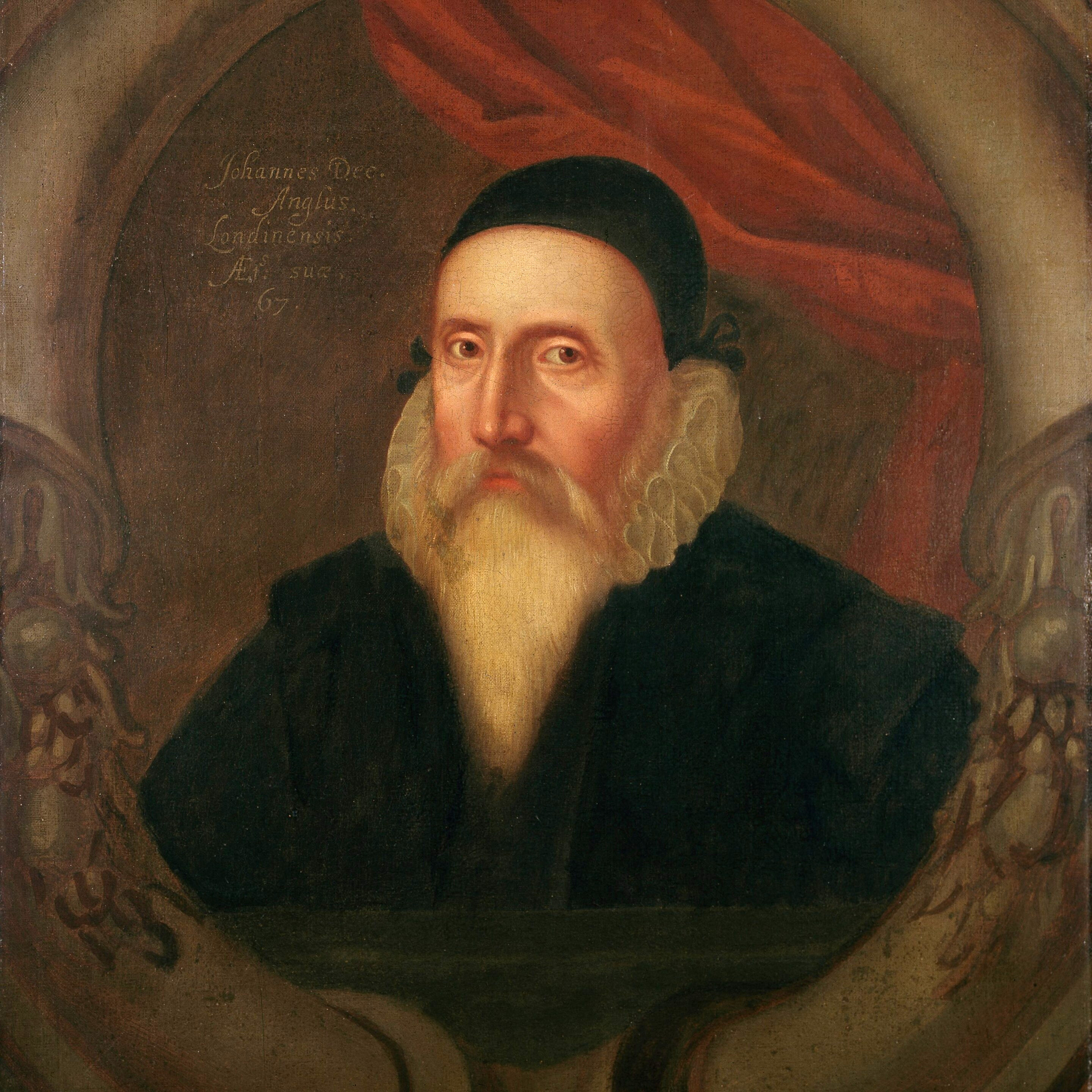
In ZombiU, John Dee made what was known as the Black Prophecy, which was realized in a 2012 zombie apocalypse.

Four hundred years ago, scientist John Dee made what was known as the Black Prophecy. The Prepper, an ex-army, no-nonsense man, prepares for the coming apocalypse, and a secret society known as the Ravens of Dee researches Dee's predictions to stop them from taking place. In November 2012, the Black Prophecy begins to be realized in the form of an outbreak of zombies in London.

After the outbreak the player character is led to the Prepper's bunker, where he receives weapons, a bug-out bag and the Prepper Pad, a device with a built-in scanner and radar. The Prepper, a Raven of Dee, left the organization due to a difference in interpreting Dee's prophecy. According to the scientist, Black Angels would save the world; the Ravens thought that Dee was referring to their organization, but the Prepper believed that he was talking about something worse.

The player goes underground while scavenging at Buckingham Palace and is contacted by Dr. Knight, a physician for the British Royal Family who is trying to find a cure. He orders the player to find diaries and notes left by Dee in exchange for scanner upgrades and a virucide, a chemical capable of killing the virus in those that are infected. This is done without the knowledge of the Prepper, who believes that a cure is impossible. After leaving the palace the player is led by Sondra to the remnants of the Ravens of Dee and tries to escape with the player in a helicopter on the Tower of London. A supernatural force drives a flock of ravens into the propeller, making the helicopter crash. The player returns to the Prepper's bunker, and Sondra promises to save them.

In the bunker, the generator is running out of fuel and the Prepper tells the player to get petrol from a man named Vikram. The player finds Vikram, who has gone mad; he and his young child tell the player to go to a local nursery to get antibiotics for his wife. Despite the Prepper's protests, who thinks the player should raid the petrol station, he goes to the nursery; the staff and children have been eaten by a nurse, who became a ghost-like monster capable of teleportation. The player returns with the antibiotics only to find that Vikram has become infected and eaten his family, though he begs the player to kill him before succumbing to the virus, with the player granting his request.

On the way back to the bunker with the petrol, the player receives a distress signal from a young girl that she and her family are barricaded in St. George's Church. Although the Prepper correctly insists it is a trap, the player goes to rescue her. The player is kidnapped by Boris, the self-proclaimed King of Zombies, and his gang, who force survivors to fight off waves of zombies in the church's courtyard. Boris' lights, microphone, and music attract a horde of zombies, and he and his gang are eaten whilst the player escapes.

The player has enough upgrades to collect Dee's remaining letters for Dr. Knight, who believes that he can now make a panacea. The player returns to the safe house, where Knight reveals that the panacea is not a cure but a vaccine. The Prepper expresses profound disappointment in the player as he returns to Buckingham Palace. Knight has left his bunker for the queen's quarters to access data on a USB flash drive. The player goes through the palace, only to discover that Knight has been turned into a zombie, forcing the player to kill him. The player uses Knight's eye to bypass a retinal scanner and collect the flash drive.

They run back to the Tower of London as the RAF is about to firebomb London and Sondra tries to keep her promise to rescue the player. This enrages the Prepper, who orders the player to leave the safe house and vows to outlive the Ravens of Dee. After the player leaves, the Prepper (who has been using survivors to stock his food supplies) finds a new lackey to do his bidding.

== Development ==
=== Origin ===
Fighting small, agile alien monsters in Killer Freaks from Outer Space

ZombiU was developed by Ubisoft Montpellier with an 80-person team; Ubisoft Bucharest provided additional assistance. The game's development paralleled that of Rayman Legends, another Montpellier project. It was produced by Guillaume Brunier, with Gabrielle Shrager its director and lead writer; Brunier and Shrager had collaborated on the development of From Dust. The team was approached by Nintendo to develop a mature game for their Wii U platform. The team developed the game using the proprietary LyN game engine. Since the hardware design was incomplete, the team made a number of prototypical games and decided that the new title would extensively utilize the Wii U GamePad. Originally conceived as a tie-in for Raving Rabbids, ZombiU was described as an experiment by Montpellier in adapting the Rabbids franchise for a more "hardcore" audience. According to Guillaume, the monsters were based on the Rabbids because some people found the sound generated by the Rabbids annoying; in the game, players can "trash and destroy" them. The association with Rabbids was eliminated by Ubisoft during development, since they thought that turning Rabbids into monsters did not suit the Raving Rabbids franchise. Announced at E3 2011 as Killer Freaks from Outer Space, the arcade first-person shooter had players with extravagant weapons killing small monsters.

Although reaction to the game's announcement satisfied the studio, they realized that its fast pace would make extensive use of the GamePad while muting the TV display's utility; players must focus on one screen while ignoring the other. The tiny monsters were problematic, since shooting them was unsatisfying. The issues were singled out by Ubisoft management at a Ubisoft Paris meeting, and the team decided to slow the game's pace. The enemies were changed from small monsters to zombies, since their movement is slower and they are easily identified as monsters. According to Jean-Karl Tupin-Bron, the team was saddened by the fact that Killer Freaks would not work but delighted by the results of the transition. By September 2011, most of the Killer Freaks team had joined the zombie-game team. During the transition, the game's tone became more serious. The team tried to distinguish itself from other zombie games in the video-game market, making the GamePad its central feature. They were inspired by the 2007 film, I Am Legend, in which the protagonist is the only survivor left in a city and must be constantly on guard against zombies. ZombiU, the game's working title, became its official name since it was a zombie game for Wii U.

=== Design ===
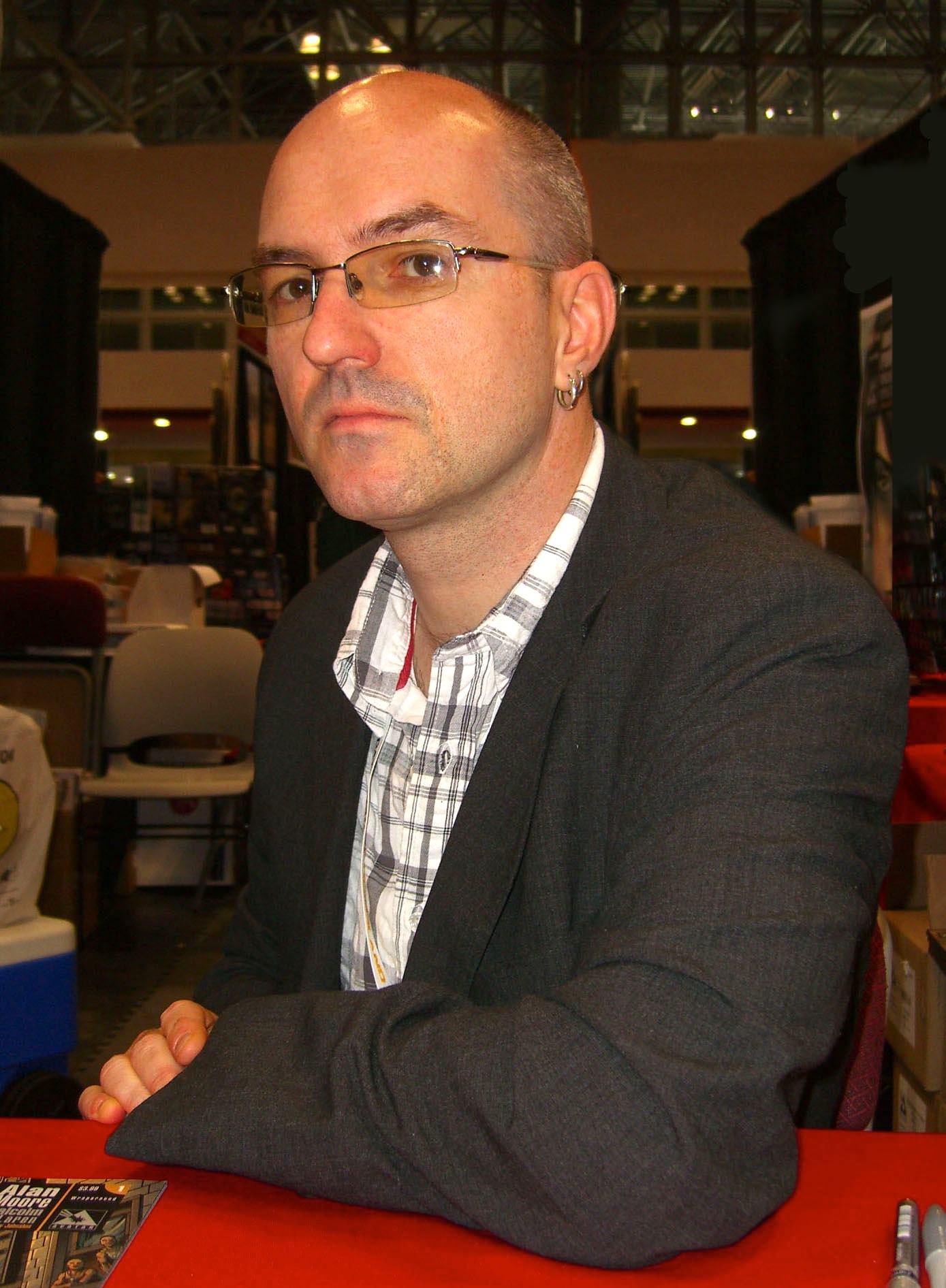
Antony Johnston was ZombiU's co-writer.

The team chose London as ZombiU's setting because the prominence of the city after hosting the 2012 Olympics, and its dark history (including Jack the Ripper) matched the tone of the game. The blend of modern and medieval architecture supported the world they wanted to build, something not present in the US. London's proximity to the French developer also allowed the team to research the city. According to writer Antony Johnston, the game features environments from a lavish palace to decaying ruins to "reflect the contrast of modern London". London allowed the development team to use Beefeaters, royal guards and a cricket bat inspired by Shaun of the Dead. The cricket bat was the only melee weapon in the game's original Wii U version. After realizing that some players used the bat almost exclusively while playing the game, Shrager regretted not adding more melee weapons and thought that the players deserved a more-varied experience.

The Wii U GamePad was described as a survival kit for players. It was inspired by the studio's previous game, Peter Jackson's King Kong, in which players make use of the environment to survive (such as using a torch to scare off enemies); the team made the GamePad a survival kit, taking considerable time to fine-tune the GamePad's functions. Although it was initially possible for players to plan strategy with the GamePad, they rarely did so. The team then retooled the system to include features such as the mini-map, resulting in players focusing on the GamePad and ignoring the action on the TV. Eventually, the team balanced player time on both screens by switching from first- to third-person perspective when the player uses the survival kit. Players are vulnerable when using the kit, prompting them to look at the TV screen while using the GamePad. This increases the game's tension, making it more scary to play. According to Guillaume, the team realized this potential when they implemented the lock-pick feature (when players must be aware of their surroundings while trying to unlock a door). To further immerse players in the game, the voice of the Prepper is channeled through the GamePad's speakers and players need to read text with the pad; since the GamePad is a real-world object, the experience is more intimate. The pad displayed most crucial information to the player, and the game did not have a user interface.

ZombiU was designed as a realistic zombie game. Fear was the game's core emotion and it should be played slowly, similar to some classic horror games. According to game director Jean-Phillipe Caro, players will do badly if they try to play it as a fast-paced action shooter like Call of Duty and ignore the GamePad. A prominent game mechanic is the permadeath system, intended to increase its tension. With the system, the game featured several survivors instead of a hero character. Its narrative was designed to rely on environmental storytelling rather than cutscenes, and players would understand the story through the game experience. The team introduced a persistent level design, in which when players continue playing after their initial survivor is killed. Action by the previous survivor will still affect the game's world; previously-killed zombies will not re-spawn. The permadeath system was debated, with concerns about loading times and backtracking. To ensure that the game's narrative would continue after a player-controlled character died, the survivors were not voiced to avoid narrative dissonance; this made the player, not the survivors, the protagonist. Although Shrager was relieved when the central character was dropped, writing the game was the "toughest challenge" she had ever faced in games. Since survivors can die anywhere in the game, linking the story became difficult. The team introduced the Prepper, an important character who communicates with the survivors by radio to link them and advance the narrative. During development, the permadeath concept was nearly removed.

The game was designed to be difficult but fair, inspired by difficult games such as Dark Souls and Demon's Souls. Brunier added that the game can be "punitive" at times as they wanted to "set the mind of the player in the survival mode". The permadeath system ensured that players are often challenged, since every zombie can be a deadly threat. It fit the game's survival theme, giving players an incentive to continue. The game was designed for players to learn by experience, slowly improving their skill. The Metroid franchise inspired ZombiU's structure, enabling players to backtrack; Left 4 Dead inspired enemy placement, and Condemned: Criminal Origins influenced the game's first-person perspective. Its content was inspired by Capcom's Resident Evil and zombie comics, films and books such as Dead Set and Night of the Living Dead: London.

ZombiU's offline multiplayer mode was developed by Ubisoft Bucharest. Conceived during early development, it was kept when the core game was reiterated; its asymmetrical experience made the developer believe in the Wii U's potential, and was the demo Ubisoft showed the public during E3 2011. A cooperative multiplayer mode and online play were planned by the developer, but were removed due to time constraints.

Cris Velasco was the game's composer. By the time Velasco began composing its music, ZombiU was playable; its audio director sent him game footage to help him understand the type of music needed. He spent 10 days composing the music, and assembled a string quintet of two violins, a viola, and two cellos to record it. Known as the Apocalypse Ensemble, it played "rawer sound" which makes the soundtrack menacing.

== Release ==
ZombiU was introduced during Ubisoft's press conference at E3 2012. A webcomic, written by Johnston and illustrated by Kev Crossley, was published on November 12 to promote the game. The 14-page comic, Z-14, was the game's prequel and linked ZombiU to the initial zombie outbreak. ZombiU was released on November 18, 2012, as a Wii U launch game. At release, European players could only purchase the game from 11 p.m. to 3 a.m. due to a Nintendo-imposed restriction. According to Nintendo of Europe, a German law required that games with mature content be purchased only at night. (Note: Nintendo of Europe was based in Germany, and the law affected its operation throughout Europe.) After negotiations with the German entertainment software self-regulating organization, the restriction was lifted in March 2013. A Wii U package with the game was released on February 13, 2013. In addition to the Wii U, its accessories, a Pro Controller and ZombiU, the package contained a downloadable copy of Nintendo Land and ZombiU artwork and developer commentary.

Ubisoft executive Tony Key said that although the game was designed for the Wii U, the company might bring it to other platforms. Following several leaks, Ubisoft confirmed Zombi for PlayStation 4, Windows, and Xbox One. Developed by Straight Right (who had developed Mass Effect 3's Wii U version), it was released on August 18, 2015. The game is similar to the original, with minor updates and enhancements. Second-screen gameplay was moved to the main screen, only appearing when required. While the cricket bat was the only melee weapon in ZombiU, Zombi added two more: a shovel with a longer range and the ability to hit more than one zombie at a time, and a nailed bat that inflicts more damage, has a higher critical-hit chance and can also hit more than one enemy at a time. Zombi's flashlight can switch to a wider, further-reaching beam which uses more battery life and increases the risk of attracting zombies. The flashlight must be kept off for 30 seconds to recharge, requiring that its use be planned. Zombi has only the solo campaign, without local multiplayer or online single-player features. The boxed game was released on January 21, 2016.

== Reception ==
ZombiU
Also known as Zombi

Aggregate score
Aggregator	Score			
Aggregator	PC	PS4	Wii U	Xbox One
Metacritic	65/100	71/100	77/100	72/100

Review scores
Publication	Score			
Publication	PC	PS4	Wii U	Xbox One
1Up.com			C+	
Destructoid			8/10	
Eurogamer			9/10	
Game Informer			5/10	
GameSpot		7/10	4.5/10	
GamesRadar+		2.5/5	3/5	2.5/5
Giant Bomb			4/5	
IGN			6.3/10	7.5/10
Joystiq			4.5/5	
PC Gamer (US)	55/100			
Polygon			8/10	
VideoGamer.com		8/10	8/10	

=== ZombiU critical reception ===
ZombiU received "generally favorable" reviews from critics according to review aggregator website Metacritic, with scores ranging from 4/10 given by GameSpot to 92% awarded by Official Nintendo Magazine. Although Montpellier was initially disappointed by some of the critical reviews, the studio was pleased with the game's overall reception.

James Stephanie Sterling of Destructoid wrote that ZombiU's zombies were intimidating by comparison with other zombie games. Sterling called it an "oppressive" experience, since players were diverted by the GamePad while the game continued in real time. This was echoed by Rich Stanton of Eurogamer, who thought that the system made the game experience scarier. According to Stanton, it was one of the few zombie titles which lived up to the phrase "survival horror". Hollander Cooper of GamesRadar agreed, saying that ZombiU "[honed] in on the 'survival' part of the 'survival horror' genre better than any release in recent memory". Patrick Klepek of Giant Bomb wrote that the game had some very scary moments, which players who liked survival horror would enjoy. Richard Mitchell of Joystiq praised its atmosphere, which he compared favourably with Condemned: Criminal Origins. Chris Schilling of VideoGamer.com agreed, calling its atmosphere "authentic" and "rich". However, Schilling found the later stages disappointing as the game becomes less frightening with the introduction of more-powerful weapons.

Sterling wrote that the permadeath system makes the game feel scarier, saying that the emotional impact on players is more significant than the typical game over screen; the former player character could be considered a "mute monument" to player failure. According to Klepek, seeing a player character become a zombie was depressing and "soul-crushing". Arthur Gies of Polygon wrote that the system helped create an "overwhelming sense of fear and risk", and made him play the game in a more careful, tactical manner. Stanton wrote that the system often leads to "fraught backpack hunts", since players must retrieve their items from the previous player character; if they die, the items would be lost forever. According to Stanton, the system makes the game's items more meaningful and backtracking more fun. Greg Miller of IGN found the game paradoxically cool and nonsensical. Marty Sliva of 1Up.com thought the game was decent but could be improved stating: "I really hope to see Ubisoft work on a followup that fixes some of the rough patches and delivers the survival experience which the mechanics seem to be promising. Until then, we're left with a launch title full of unique ideas, but lacking the necessary cohesion to be truly great."

Sterling called the plot "typical", writing that it was a basic backstory to complement the game's survival theme. Miller agreed, saying that ZombiU did not require a strong narrative. Stanton found the game's narrative not particularly engaging, but the environmental storytelling was "skillfully done". Turi found its concept interesting, but was disappointed with the lack of a central character and the game's excessive backtracking. Cooper called the story "light", but too complicated by the end; he was dissatisfied with the lack of interesting characters. Gies appreciated the game world's development, praising Ubisoft for creating a believable setting; however, he and Schilling were disappointed by the story's supernatural elements.

ZombiU's extensive use of the Wii U GamePad received mixed reception.

Sterling wrote that there was too little enemy variety, which made the game's combat repetitive. He also criticized its map design, saying that in his 11-hour experience with the game, he could not find his way to objectives for at least two hours. Turi called the game's map confusing, agreeing with Sterling that players would easily get lost. He criticized the game's melee weapon as unsatisfying to use, comparing it unfavorably to Dead Island and Left 4 Dead 2. According to Turi, the melee-combat shortcomings were highlighted by the game's shortage of ammunition. Maxwell McGee of GameSpot and Miller shared similar concerns, calling the melee combat repetitive. According to McGee, the game's simplistic mission design and puzzle offer little variety. Stanton wrote that although the game's combat was simple, it developed into "something special" since players needed to choose their weapons wisely. Cooper found several flaws in the systems, such as characters not acknowledging the death of a previous player character and forcing players to replay some game segments. Klepek found the gunplay to be mediocre, but thematically correct.

Sterling found the use of the Wii U GamePad "hit-and-miss", stating that the scanning and radar functions are enjoyable. He noted that he was annoyed by the lock-picking and barricading minigames, which required players to press the touchscreen rapidly. According to Sterling, the latter two functions were pointless filler. Stanton praised the scanning system for immersing players in the game. Turi found the two-screen experience a noble effort, but was dissatisfied with its controls. According to McGee, the GamePad adds little to the game and some of its functions are better handled with a controller. Klepek called most of GamePad features well-implemented with the exception of the gyroscope controls. Mitchell wrote that the GamePad enhanced the overall gameplay, but disliked the screen-tapping minigame in certain GamePad features.

Sterling compared its graphics to a Wii title and noted technical flaws, including glitches and slow loading times. He and Stanton thought that some of the game's assets were used excessively. Turi severely criticized the game's lighting system, saying that it looked blurry even given its nighttime setting. Miller also noted the game's sub-par texture, and was disappointed by its lack of visual appeal. Turi and Gies noted the difficulty of dragging items with the GamePad, but Gies thought it added tension to the game.

Sterling called the multiplayer mode King of Zombie being fun to play; playing as King Boris was more enjoyable than playing a zombie survivor. Turi echoed him, noting that a player should only play as a human survivor with a Pro Controller; playing with the nunchuck was "unbearable". McGee enjoyed this mode more than the single-player campaign for its action. Cooper liked the mode, but felt that the lack of online multiplayer limited its longevity. Klepek also liked the mode's concept but called the two-player mode a bit limited and not sufficiently enjoyable, a sentiment shared by Mitchell. Schilling thought the mode offered only "brief entertainment" and was an "afterthought".

Larry Frum from CNN listed ZombiU in their top 10 best video games of 2012, calling the story "dark" and that the game "captured" his attention for "its unique style of gameplay and gritty scenarios".

=== Zombi critical reception ===
The game's Zombi version received "mixed or average" reviews, according to Metacritic. Christopher Livingston of PC Gamer noted that the PC version had many glitches and occasionally crashed. Shabana Arif of GamesRadar found the system unrefined and repetitive, even with new melee weapons. Disappointed with the lack of enhancement of the original game's graphics, the limited 30 frames per second and the GamePad transition to other home consoles, she called the package a wasted opportunity. James Orry of VideoGamer.com also criticized the lack of visual upgrading and overall improvement and the exclusion of the multiplayer mode, but found the game "an excellent entry in the survival horror genre".

=== Sales and legacy ===
ZombiU was the 17th best-selling game in the United Kingdom in its first week of release, the best-selling third-party Wii U launch title. The game was unprofitable for Ubisoft, and a sequel (which would have had cooperative multiplayer and levels with multiple paths) was cancelled. ZombiU helped shape the asynchronous gameplay of Ubisoft's 2014 game, Watch Dogs; its disappointing sales prompted Ubisoft to turn Rayman Legends (an announced 2013 Wii U exclusive) into a multi-platform game to reach a larger audience.

== See also ==
- Zombi, an adventure game released as Ubisoft's first title in 1986
- List of horror video games
