= Planet Helpless =

Studio album by Puressence
- Released: October 7, 2002
- Genre: Alternative rock, indie rock
- Length: 45:31
- Label: Island
- Producer: Clive Martin

Puressence chronology
Only Forever (1998)	Planet Helpless (2002)	Don't Forget to Remember (2007)

Professional ratings
Review scores
Source	Rating
Allmusic	link
The Guardian	link
Leonard's Lair	link

Planet Helpless is the third album by English alternative rock band Puressence, released in 2002. "Walking Dead" was the only single released from the album. The second single was penned as "She's Gotten Over You" but was not released due to the band leaving Island Records after Planet Helpless had been released.

== Track listing ==
All songs written by Mudriczki, Szuminski, Matthews and McDonald.

1. "Walking Dead" – 3:25
2. "Prodigal Song" – 3:33
3. "How Does It Feel" – 3:06
4. "Analgesic Love Song" – 3:43
5. "She's Gotten Over You" – 3:26
6. "Make Time" – 3:27
7. "Planet Helpless" – 3:03
8. "Ironstone Izadora" – 3:31
9. "You Move Me" – 3:49
10. "Comfort When You Smile" – 4:03
11. "Strangers" – 3:09
12. "Heart of Gold" – 3:46
13. "Throw Me a Line" – 3:30

== Personnel ==
=== Musicians ===
- James Mudriczki - vocals
- Neil McDonald - guitar
- Kevin Matthews - bass
- Anthony Szuminski - drums

=== Technical ===
- Clive Martin - producer and engineer
- Peter Anderson - Photography
