= John Tibbs =

American Christian musician (born 1990)

- Born: John Wesley Tibbs; March 22, 1990 (age 36); Lexington, Kentucky
- Origin: Punxsutawney, Pennsylvania
- Genres: Southern rock, country gospel, Americana
- Occupations: Singer, songwriter
- Instrument: Vocals
- Years active: 2010–present
- Labels: Fair Trade Services, Columbia
- Website: johntibbsmusic.com

John Wesley Tibbs (born March 22, 1990) is an American Christian musician, who showcases his signature southern heartland roots rock sound, with biblically based autobiographical lyricism. He has released three independently-made extended plays, Origins in 2010, Swallowing Death, Breathing Life in 2012, and Anchor in 2013. His first major-label release, Dead Man Walking, is released by Fair Trade Services, in late October 2015. The single, "Dead Man Walking", featuring Ellie Holcomb, has broken through on the Billboard magazine Christian Airplay chart. His first studio album, Dead Man Walking, was released on February 5, 2016, from Fair Trade Services alongside Columbia Records. He released his independent project, Heartland, in October 2017.

== Early and personal life ==
Tibbs was born, John Wesley Tibbs on March 22, 1990, in Lexington, Kentucky. Tibbs attended Anderson University, located in Anderson, Indiana, where he led worship at Madison Park Church, for a four-year stint. Tibbs would date and eventually marry Indianapolis, Indiana-native, Emily Suzanne Tibbs (née, Stottlemyer), in 2011. In the early-to-mid 2010s, they would leave Anderson to move to Nashville, Tennessee. He is an avid fan of the Kentucky Wildcats men's basketball team.

== Music career ==
His music recording career started in 2010, with the extended play, Origins, that was independently released. He would release two more extended plays independently, Swallowing Death, Breathing Life in 2012, and Anchor in 2013, where Matt Conner in a four star review wrote, "It's astounding that a label hasn't swept up the bright young star in the worship universe known as John Tibbs." Upon demand, Tibbs began to tour his music full-time in 2013. In addition to touring consistently, he amassed an online community of more than 100,000 fans who helped crowd-fund two breakout independent recordings which earned national notoriety on NoiseTrade. This influence led him to tour independently with Audrey Assad, and open for acts like Gungor and Tenth Avenue North. Tibbs would go on to sign with Fair Trade Services, where they are releasing, Dead Man Walking, on October 30, 2015. Earlier this year, audiences across the country were introduced to Tibbs' compelling live performance as a special guest on Newsboys' "We Believe...God's Not Dead" Spring Tour. His single, "Dead Man Walking", featuring Ellie Holcomb, has broken through on the Billboard magazine Christian Airplay chart, becoming a Top 20 AC song at Christian radio. The song and the entire EP was produced by Ben Shive. His first studio album, Dead Man Walking, was released on February 5, 2016, from Fair Trade Services alongside Columbia Records. Tibbs released his independent eight-song album, Heartland, October 2017.

== Discography ==
Studio albums

- Dead Man Walking (February 5, 2016, Fair Trade/Columbia)

EPs

- Origins (2010)
- Swallowing Death, Breathing Life (2012)
- Anchor (2013)
- Dead Man Walking (2015)
- Wilder Years (2020)

Singles

- After the Night (2022)
