= Ellie Holcomb =

American singer (born 1982)

- Born: Elizabeth Asher Bannister; September 12, 1982 (age 44); Nashville, Tennessee, U.S.
- Genres: Contemporary Christian music, folk rock, Americana
- Occupations: Singer, songwriter
- Instruments: Vocals, acoustic guitar
- Years active: 2005–present
- Label: Full Heart
- Website: ellieholcomb.com

Elizabeth Asher Holcomb (née Bannister; born September 12, 1982) is an American CCM-folk singer-songwriter and she grew up in Nashville. Her father is noted music producer Brown Bannister, and she was a member of Drew Holcomb and the Neighbors, whose frontman is her husband Drew. They met at University of Tennessee as students.

== Early life and education ==
Elizabeth Asher Bannister was born in Nashville on September 12, 1982, to Brown and Debra Bannister. She graduated from Christ Presbyterian Academy and received her bachelor's in English from the University of Tennessee in 2005. In 2006 she earned her master's of science degree in teacher education from the university. In 2006, she married Drew Holcomb, and they have three children. They live in Nashville.

== Music career ==
Holcomb began her musical career with Drew Holcomb and the Neighbors in 2005, and she started her individual career pursuit in 2011. In 2011, she released the Magnolia EP, which charted on numerous Billboard charts on September 10, 2011. Her second EP, With You Now did not come out until 2013, and the album reached No. 7 on the Christian Albums chart on September 7, 2013. Holcomb released her debut studio album on the Full Heart Music label on February 18, 2014, As Sure as the Sun, which has garnered critical praise. She was named Best New Artist at the 2014 GMA Dove Awards.

After the success of As Sure as the Sun, Ellie Holcomb released her second full-length album, Red Sea Road on January 27, 2017. Red Sea Road was produced by her father, Brown Bannister, who was battling cancer while she recorded the album. The family banded together and recording the album was often an outlet for comfort for Ellie. The album peaked at No. 2 on the Christian Chart. Three songs have charted in the Top Christian Singles: "Find You Here" peaked at No. 21, "Red Sea Road" peaked at No. 13 and "Wonderfully Made" reached No. 143.

In 2018, Holcomb released two children's works, an album, Sing: Creation Songs, and a book, Who Sang the First Song? In June 2021, she released Canyon in partnership with Capitol CMG. In 2022, she and her husband, Drew Holcomb, released Coming Home: A Collection of Songs.

== Discography ==
=== Studio albums ===
Title	Album details	Peak chart positions					Certifications (sales threshold)
Title	Album details	US	US Christ	US Indie	US Vinyl	UK C&G	Certifications (sales threshold)
As Sure as the Sun	Released: February 18, 2014; Label: Full Heart; Formats: CD, digital download, streaming	34	2	7	13	18	
Red Sea Road	Released: January 27, 2017; Label: Full Heart; Formats: CD, digital download, streaming	106	3	9	—	—	
Canyon	Released: June 25, 2021; Label: Full Heart, Capitol CMG; Formats: CD, LP, digital download, streaming	— (Note: Canyon did not enter the Billboard 200, but peaked at No. 97 on the Billboard Top Album Sales)	7	—	—	—	
Coming Home: A Collection of Songs (with Drew Holcomb)	Released: January 14, 2022; Label: Magnolia Music; Format: CD, LP, digital download, streaming	—	—	—	—	—	
Memory Bank (with Drew Holcomb)	Released: January 24, 2025; Label: Magnolia Music; Format: CD, LP, digital download, streaming	—	—	—	—	—	
Far Country	Released: September 12, 2025; Label: Capitol CMG; Format: CD, LP, digital download, streaming	—	—	—	—	—	
"—" denotes a recording that did not chart or was not released in that territory.

=== Extended plays ===
Title	Album details	Peak chart positions				Certifications (sales threshold)
Title	Album details	US	US Christ	US Indie	US Kid	Certifications (sales threshold)
Magnolia	Released: August 23, 2011; Label: Drew Holcomb; Formats: CD, digital download, streaming	—	16	48	—	
With You Now	Released: August 19, 2013; Label: Good Time Records; Formats: CD, digital download, streaming	—	7	—	—	
Sing: Creation Songs	Released: September 21, 2018; Label: Full Heart Music; Formats: CD, digital download, streaming	— (Note: Sing: Creation Songs did not enter the Billboard 200, but peaked at No. 85 on the Billboard Top Album Sales)	—	15	1	
Sing: Remembering Songs	Released: February 21, 2020; Label: Full Heart; Format: CD, digital download, streaming	—	—	—	4	
Sing: Christmas Songs	Released: November 1, 2022; Label: Full Heart/Capitol CMG; Format: digital download, streaming	—	—	—	—	
All of My Days	Released: April 12, 2024; Label: Full Heart/Capitol CMG; Format: CD, LP, digital download, streaming	—	37	—	—	
Sing: Spring Songs	Released: March 21, 2025; Label: Full Heart/Capitol CMG; Format: TBA	—	—	—	—	
"—" denotes a recording that did not chart or was not released in that territory.

=== Singles ===
Title	Year	Peak chart positions						Certifications (sales threshold)	Album
Title	Year	US Rock	US Alt	US Christ	US Christ Air	US Christ AC	US Christ Digital	Certifications (sales threshold)	Album
"As Sure as the Sun"	2014	—	—	47	—	—	—		As Sure as the Sun
"The Broken Beautiful"	2014	—	—	20	18	18	—		As Sure as the Sun
"Hope Is Alive"	2014	—	—	48	33	10	—		As Sure as the Sun
"Red Sea Road	2017	—	—	42	—	—	—		Red Sea Road
"Find You Here"	2017	—	—	—	—	—	—		Red Sea Road
"Electricity" (with Drew Holcomb)	2018	—	—	—	—	—	—		Non-album singles
"You and Me" (with Drew Holcomb)	2019	—	—	—	—	—	—		Non-album singles
"Let It Snow" (with Drew Holcomb)	2019	—	—	—	—	—	—		Let It Snow
"Survival" (with NEEDTOBREATHE and Drew Holcomb)	2020	— (Note: "Survival" did not enter the Billboard Hot Rock Songs, but peaked at No. 10 on the Billboard Rock Digital Song Sales)	— (Note: "Survival" did not enter the Billboard Alternative Songs, but peaked at No. 12 on the Billboard Alternative Digital Song Sales)	26	21	18	—		Out of Body
"Bring You Home" (with The Dailys and Jillian Edwards)	2020	—	—	—	—	—	—		Non-album singles
"Falling Apart" (with The Dailys and Jillian Edwards)	2020	—	—	—	—	—	—		Non-album singles
"Constellations"	2020	—	—	—	44	—	23		Canyon
"Canyon"	2021	—	—	47	—	—	—		Canyon
"I Will Carry You"	2021	—	—	11	13	9	9		Canyon
"I Don't Want to Miss It"	2021	—	—	25	24	20	—		Canyon
"Mine" (with Drew Holcomb)	2021	—	—	—	—	—	—		Canyon
"Color"	2021	—	—	—	—	—	—		Canyon
"A Woman" (with FAITHFUL and Amy Grant)	2021	—	—	—	—	—	—		Non-album singles
"Keep on the Sunny Side" (with Drew Holcomb)	2021	—	—	—	—	—	—		Non-album singles
"Hung the Moon" (with Drew Holcomb)	2021	—	—	—	—	—	—		Non-album singles
"Sounding Joy"	2022	—	—	—	—	—	—		Sing: Christmas Songs
"Bones" (with Drew Holcomb)	2023	—	—	—	—	—	—		Non-album single
"Stronger"	2023	—	—	—	39	—	—		Canyon
"Kinda Wild" (with JUDAH.)	2023	—	—	—	—	—	—		Non-album singles
"Brick by Brick" (with Drew Holcomb)	2024	—	—	—	—	—	—		Non-album singles
"Where Can I Go"	2024	—	—	—	—	—	—		All of My Days
"Be Okay" (with Lauren Daigle)	2024	—	—	—	—	—	—		Non-album single
"Memory Bak" (with Drew Holcomb)	2024	—	—	—	—	—	—		Memory Bank
"High Seas" (with Drew Holcomb)	2024	—	—	—	—	—	—		Memory Bank
"Rain or Shine" (with Drew Holcomb)	2025	—	—	—	—	—	—		Memory Bank
"Spring Sings"	2025	—	—	—	—	—	—		Sing: Spring Songs
"Far Country"	2025	—	—	—	—	—	—		Far Country
"The Whole Thing"	2025	—	—	—	—	—	—		Far Country
"Hope's Gonna Find You"	2025	—	—	—	26	24	—		Far Country
"—" denotes a recording that did not chart or was not released in that territory.

=== Other charted songs ===
Title	Year	Peak chart positions			Certifications (sales threshold)	Album
Title	Year	US Christ	US Christ Air	US Christ AC	Certifications (sales threshold)	Album
"Marvelous Light"	2015	—	50	—		As Sure as the Sun
"Dead Man Walking" (with John Tibbs)	2015	—	29	24		Dead Man Walking
"Find You Here"	2017	29	28	21		Red Sea Road
"Just as Good" (with Chris Renzema)	2018	—	39	—		Get Out of the Way of Your Own Heart
"Sweet Ever After" (with Bear Rinehart and NEEDTOBREATHE)	2021	36	—	—		Canyon
"Jingle Bells"	2022	—	35	29		Sing: Christmas Songs
"In the Room" (with Matt Maher, Ben Fuller, and Chris Brown)	2024	49	19	25		The Stories I Tell Myself
"All of My Days"	2024	42	—	—		All of My Days
"—" Denotes a recording that did not chart or was not released in that territory.

== Awards ==
- GMA Dove Award's New Artist of the Year 2014
- GMA Dove Award's Children's Album of the Year 2020, Sing: Remembering Songs
- GMA Dove Award's Recorded Music Packaging of the Year 2022, Canyon
