= Rick Beato =

American musician and YouTube personality (born 1962)

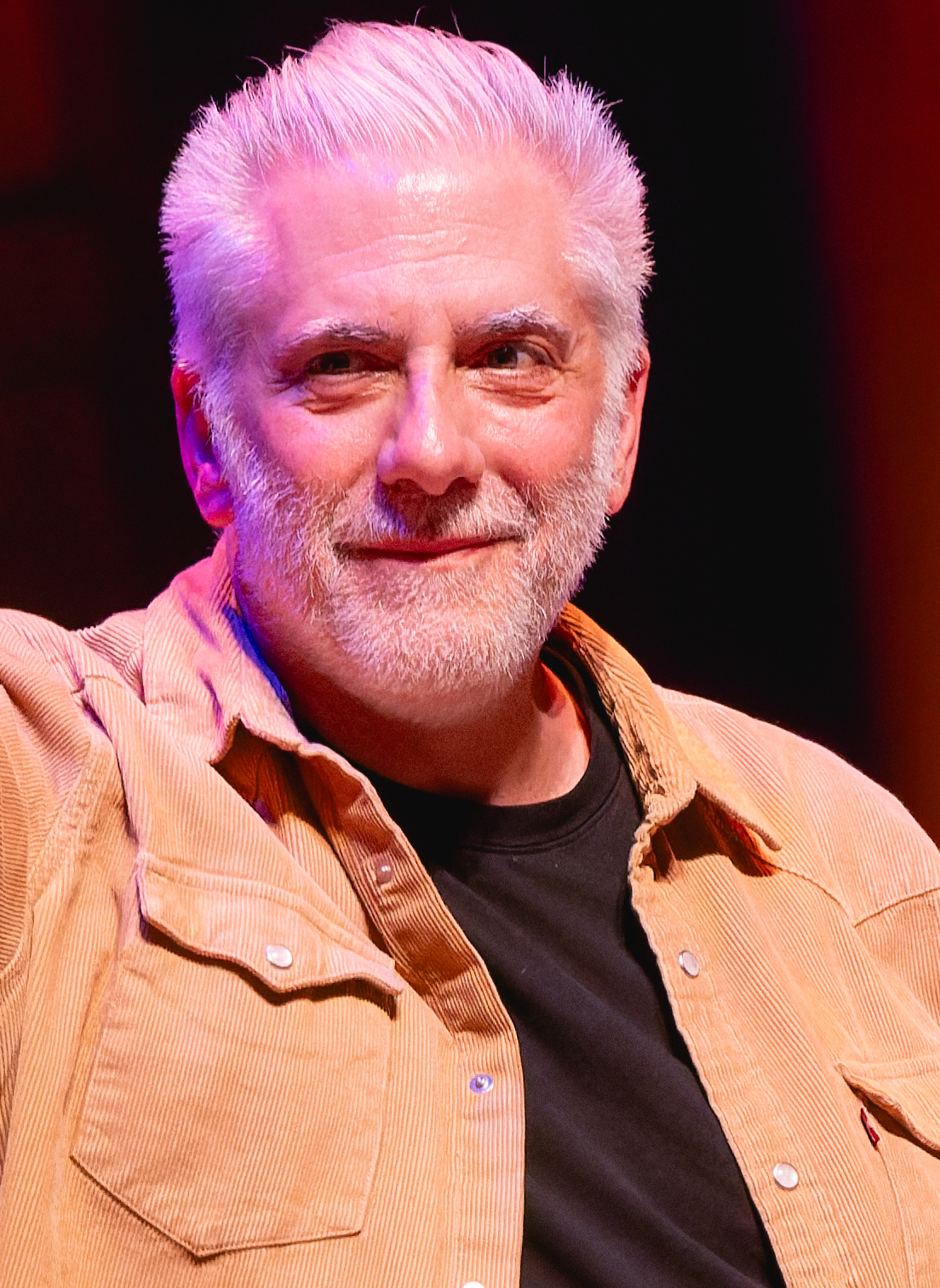
- Beato in 2025
- Born: Richard John Beato; April 24, 1962 (age 64); Fairport, New York, U.S.
- Education: Ithaca College (B.A.); New England Conservatory of Music (M.A.)
- Occupations: YouTuber; musician; educator

YouTube information
- Channel: Rick Beato
- Years active: 2015–present
- Genre: Music
- Subscribers: 5.8 million
- Views: 2,113 billion
- Musical career
- Instruments: Guitar; cello; bass
- Formerly of: The Monroz; Rival Suns; Billionaire
- Last updated: August 16, 2026
- Website: rickbeato.com

Richard John Beato (/biˈɑːtoʊ/ bee-AH-toh; born April 24, 1962) is an American YouTuber, multi-instrumentalist, music producer, and educator. Since the early 1980s, he has worked variously as a musician, songwriter, audio engineer, and record producer; he has also lectured on music at universities.

Beato owns and operates Black Dog Sound Studios in Stone Mountain, Georgia. He has produced for and worked in the studio with bands such as Needtobreathe, Parmalee, and Shinedown. On his YouTube channel, he covers different aspects of rock, jazz, blues, electronic, rap, and pop, and he conducts interviews with musicians and producers.

== Early life and education ==
Beato was born in Rochester, New York, and grew up in Fairport, a suburb nine miles (14 km) east of Rochester. He is the sixth of seven children; he has two sisters and four brothers. His family life was highly musical: at an early age, he was introduced to the rock music of the 1960s by his older sisters. His mother's siblings and father were musicians and music teachers. He started playing cello at seven. At 13, he switched to the double bass, and at 14, he began playing guitar, initially learning by ear. After several years, he began formal training from a neighbor who owned a local music store.

After graduating from Fairport High School in 1980, Beato studied at Ithaca College, obtaining a Bachelor of Arts degree in classical bass; he earned a master's degree in jazz guitar from the New England Conservatory of Music in 1987.

== Career ==
Beato has been a session musician, songwriter, studio engineer, mixer, and record producer. He has lectured at several schools, including the University of Alabama and Berklee College of Music, and taught jazz studies at Ithaca College.

=== Band ===
Beato was a member of a band called Billionaire, formed in 1997. After releasing a self-produced debut album in 1998, titled The Goodnight Sky, Billionaire signed to Republic Records and put out a second album, Ascension, in 2000.

=== Studio ===
Since 1995, Beato has owned Black Dog Sound Studios in Stone Mountain, Georgia. He has also previously run the record label 10 Star Records.

=== Book ===
He has published The Beato Book – A Creative Approach to Improvisation for Guitar and Other Instruments.

=== Signature guitar ===
In 2021, Gibson previewed a Rick Beato signature Les Paul Special Double Cut guitar. It comes in a special TV Blue Mist finish with P-90 pickups and Beato's signature on the truss rod cover. In 2023, a second collaboration of the model was made in a Sparkling Burgundy finish.

== YouTube career ==
Beato's YouTube channel, Everything Music, launched in 2015, has accumulated over 5 million subscribers as of May 2025. His videos, which cover a range of music-related topics, have garnered a substantial following, including close to a million followers on Instagram.

Despite his initial inexperience with video production and uncertainty about the channel's potential ("nobody's going to watch an old guy with white hair on YouTube"), Beato's extensive background in audio engineering contributed to the development of educational content aimed at a broad audience. His experience as a music professor instilled in him a passion for teaching, and he has said, "I've been very lucky to have a great music education. I wanted to pass it along to other people that aren't as fortunate as I was".

In the early days of his channel, Beato focused on creating videos that offered insights in how to play instruments, music theory, production techniques, and song analysis. His content ranged from detailed explanations of musical concepts to breakdowns of popular songs. Despite a modest start, his videos began to attract attention due to their educational value and Beato's engaging presentation style. Everything Music gained significant attention in 2016 after a video featuring his son demonstrating perfect pitch went viral, quickly amassing over three million views and helping to establish Beato's social media presence.

Following the success of his early videos, Beato expanded his channel's content to include more comprehensive music topics, such as the series "What Makes This Song Great?", where he analyzes popular songs to explain their musical structures and compositional techniques. He also conducts interviews with musicians, producers, and other music industry professionals.

One challenge that Beato has faced with YouTube is copyright issues while reviewing music. Several of his videos, including ones with Radiohead and Fleetwood Mac, were issued take-down notices due to copyright claims. In July 2020, he testified about his YouTube experiences before a United States Senate Committee on the Judiciary, which was reviewing the Digital Millennium Copyright Act and considering limitations and exceptions such as fair use.

=== Notable interviews and guests ===
Beato has conducted interviews with a diverse array of notable musicians on his channel, spanning various genres and eras. These include Peter Frampton (Beato's first interview), Sting, Brian May, Pat Metheny, Kirk Hammett, Billy Joel, Keith Jarrett, Billy Corgan, and Tori Amos.

== Discography ==
=== Band member ===
- 3 Song Demo – The Monroz (1978)
- First Light – Rival Suns (1993)
- Feel – Rival Suns (1993)
- Pressure – Rival Suns (EP, 1993)
- The Goodnight Sky – Billionaire (1998)
- Ascension – Billionaire (2000)

=== Session work ===
- Demolotion ("The Walls You Walk Through") – Umajets (1997)
- Swollen and Tender ("Mr. Combination", "Boxes") – Umajets (1999)
- Four-Star Explosion ("Up in Space", "A Postcard (from the Edge of the World)", "Breathe") – Big Atomic (2000)
- My Kung Fu Is Good ("Used to Be") – The Duke (2005)
- Echo Heart ("Close My Eyes") – Markus Fagervall (2006)

=== Production ===
Year	Artist	Title	Album	Contribution
1996	The Tender Idols		The Tender Idols	Co-producer, co-mixer
1996	Skirt		Choking on Sugar	Producer
2001	Flickerstick	"Smile", "Got a Feeling", "Beautiful"	Welcoming Home the Astronauts	Co-producer
2001	Left Front Tire		Social Icon	Producer, songwriter
2001	Michelle Malone		Hello Out There	Co-producer, musician
2002	Weekend Excursion	"I'll Never Fall in Love Again", "Best Friend"	Take Me Home	Producer, musician
2002	All Is Well		Plastic Kiss	Producer
2002	Logic 34		Demo	Producer
2002	Karma		Running on Adrenaline	Co-producer, co-mixer, musician
2003	Shinedown	"Lost in the Crowd", "In Memory", "Stranger Inside"	Leave a Whisper	Co-producer, engineer
2003	The Working Title		Everyone Here Is Wrong	Producer
2003	Endo	"Simple Lies"	Songs for the Restless	Co-writer
2003	Left Front Tire		42 Ways to Lose a Friend	Co-producer, co-writer
2003	Boxelder		Live Under the Sun	Co-producer, co-mixer, co-engineer
2004	Ingram Hill		June's Picture Show	Producer, mixer, co-writer
2004	Jump, Little Children		Between the Dim & the Dark	Producer, engineer, mixer
2004	Charlie Mars		Charlie Mars	Producer, musician
2004	Charlie Mars		EP	Co-producer, co-mixer
2004	Ingram Hill		Live with Mark & Brian	Co-writer
2005	Ingram Hill	"More Than a Feeling" (Boston cover)	Herbie: Fully Loaded soundtrack	Producer
2005	One Less Reason	"Favorite Color"	Everyday Life	Producer
2005	Mercy Drive		Mercy Drive	Producer
2005	Fozzy		All That Remains	Co-producer, co-writer
2005	I Nine	"Same in Any Language"	Elizabethtown (Music from the Motion Picture)	Producer
2006	Ingram Hill	"Solsbury Hill"	Why the Wait	Producer, engineer, mixer
2006	State of Man		Both Sides of the Story	Co-producer
2007	Needtobreathe		The Heat	Co-producer, engineer
2007	Submersed		Immortal Verses	Co-producer, co-composer, co-mixer
2007	12 Stones	"Hey Love"	Anthem for the Underdog	Co-writer
2008	Shinedown	"Son of Sam"	The Sound of Madness	Co-writer
2008	Halo Stereo		The Invisible War	Producer, mixer
2008	Stuck Mojo		The Great Revival	Engineer
2008	Crowfield		Goodbye, Goodnight, So Long Midwestern	Producer, mixer, musician
2008	Streetside Symphony		The Curse	Producer, mixer
2009	Needtobreathe		The Outsiders	Co-producer, engineer
2009	Papercut Massacre		If These Scars Could Talk	Songwriter
2009	Decyfer Down	"Ride with Me", "Moving On"	Crash	Co-writer
2010	Furyon		Underdog EP	Producer
2010	Furyon		Gravitas	Producer
2011	Needtobreathe		The Reckoning	Co-producer, engineer
2011	Crowfield		Crowfield	Producer
2011	Halo Stereo		Siren Songs	Producer, mixer
2011	Plain Jane Automobile		Your Tomorrow	Producer, mixer, musician
2012	Dark New Day		New Tradition	Co-producer
2013	Parmalee	"Carolina"	Feels Like Carolina	Co-writer
2013	Bridge to Grace		Staring in the Dark	Producer
2013	Carey Murdock	"Shot in the Dark", "You're Leaving Me"	Shot in the Dark	Producer, mixer
2014	Nashville Pussy		Up the Dosage	Mixer
2014	Rubicon Cross		Rubicon Cross	Mixer
2014	Blackwater	"Memories", "Better Man"	River	Producer, writer
2014	Yes the Raven		Love Is Covered in Dust	Co-producer, mixer
2015	Tyler Bryant & the Shakedown	"Stitch It Up"	The Wayside	Producer
2015	Furyon		Lost Salvation	Co-producer, co-mixer
2015	Atlas Road Crew		Halfway to Hopkins	Co-producer
2015	Bridge to Grace		Origins	Producer, mixer, composer
2015	John Stringer		Limitless Love & Light	Producer, musician
2016	Muddy Magnolias		Broken People	Co-producer
2017	Carter Lou & the Project	"Annabelle", "Nothing Left to Lose"	Carter Lou & the Project	Producer
2021	Dollybraid		All the Hype That Money Can Buy	Co-producer

== Views ==
Beato periodically shares his critical perspective on modern music trends and the future of music through his videos, arguing that contemporary music has declined in complexity and quality due to commercialization, streaming services like Spotify, and changes in production techniques. He believes that the industry's focus on producing hit singles and algorithm-driven playlists over full albums and artist development has led to a homogenization of music, reducing musical diversity, and stifling innovation. Furthermore, Beato criticizes modern production techniques, such as Auto-Tune and excessive digital effects, for diminishing the authenticity and richness of music. These discussions emphasize the broader debate on the impact of technological and commercial changes on music's artistic expression.

Another significant aspect of Beato's perspective is his role as a music educator. He advocates for well-funded music programs in schools, believing they are crucial for developing critical thinking skills and citing examples of influential figures like Paul Allen who were musicians. Beato is concerned about the future of music, noting the rise of artificial intelligence, the shallowness of popular music, and the decline in the number of children learning to play instruments.

In November 2023, Beato testified before a U.S. Senate A.I. Insight forum on transparency, intellectual property, and copyright. In his testimony, he proposed licensing policy for musical datasets similar to the music licensing used for films or public performances.
