= Decade (The Veer Union album) =

Studio album by The Veer Union
- Released: January 29, 2016
- Recorded: 2015
- Genre: Hard rock
- Length: 37:07
- Label: Pavement
- Producer: Crispin Earl

The Veer Union chronology
Divide the Blackened Sky (2012)	Decade (2016)	Quarantine Collaborations (2021)

Singles from Decade
- 1. "Defying Gravity" Released: December 11, 2015

Decade is the fourth studio album by Canadian alternative rock band The Veer Union. It was released on January 29, 2016. It is their first album in almost four years, and the first to feature an all new lineup outside of frontman and band co-founder Crispin Earl.

== Background ==
The band, initially formed in 2004 under the name "Veer", consisted of frontman and lead vocalist Crispin Earl, guitarists Eric Schraeder and James Fiddler, bassist Marc Roots, and drummer Neil Beaton. They released their first album, Time to Break the Spell, in 2006, and upon touring in support of it, attracted major record label support. Upon signing to Universal Motown Records, the band changed their name to a more identifiable "The Veer Union", and released Against the Grain, but were dropped from their label after touring in support of the album. The band pushed forward on another album, Divide the Blackened Sky, but lost Fiddler, Roots, and Beaton shortly after recording. After touring in support of the album, Shraeder would leave as well, leaving Earl as the band's sole member. Without a band, and in financial trouble due to their record label, Rocket Science, collapsing, Earl recorded a last ditch effort, an EP titled Life Support Vol. 1, with only himself and new guitarist Ryan Ramsdell. The band was able to survive, and over the new few years, Earl was able to reassemble the band with new members Dan Sittler, Amal Wijayanayake, Tyler Reimer, and sign to new record label Pavement Entertainment. by March 2014.

== Writing and recording ==
Despite the tumultuous events prior to making the album, Earl stated that once work on the album began, it was actually the smoothest it had ever been for the band, something he attributed to the fact that it was the first time he had both a band lineup and a record label lined up prior to starting on the album.

Earl titled the album Decade due it being a decade since the band's first album, Time to Break the Spell, was released. The album's concept was also tied to the title; the album consists of five completely new songs, and five songs written over a decade ago, prior to the band's first album. Earl explained:

"The album title is a celebration of our first album which was released 10 years ago in 2006. We wanted to convey that we have been around for 10 years and while there have been a change in members and it has been a tough business, we have grown musically and as a band. So many bands have been struggling, myself included through many challenges within the industry that have made it difficult to want to stay in, I spent a lot of time in a depressed state just trying to survive so I wanted to put that into my songwriting and five of the songs on the record are songs I have written over the past year and the other five are songs I have written back in 2001 so it spans the times and bringing them all together to bring one focus sound even though they were written 10 years apart."

The five older tracks were songs that Earl had written prior to having any of the original members in the band, when Earl was simply wanting to start his own band. The tracks had been originally shelved in favor of tracks written once the band's original lineup had formed. The tracks "Make Believe" and "Watch You Lose" were originally written by Earl for Tommy Lee's solo album Tommyland: The Ride, a project he had done to finance starting up The Veer Union. The track "The Unwanted" is a reworked version of the song "Stay Away", originally released on their Demos and Bsides EP released in 2012.

== Themes and composition ==
The song "Defying Gravity" is about Earl's battle with depression.

The album was described as having hard rock elements similar to that of Breaking Benjamin, Sevendust or Skillet.

== Release and promotion ==
The album's first single, "Defying Gravity", was released on December 11, 2015, being promoted by Revolver. A music video, directed by Aaron Veale, largely featuring the band performing in black and white with various visual effects, was released two days later. In mid-February, the band announced they'd tour in support of the album through March, along with supporting acts Bobaflex, Artifas, and Bridge to Grace.

== Reception ==
Pure Grain Audio generally praised the album overall, naming the "cleverly-written call and response wordplay of the second track, 'Watch You Lose'...the menacing 'You Can't Have It All'" and the album closing "The Underrated" as standout tracks, while complaining that some tracks, such as "'I Said' recalls Evanescence, but drags on a bit."

== Track listing ==
No.	Title	Length
1.	"Defying Gravity"	4:04
2.	"Watch You Lose"	3:33
3.	"You Can't Have it All"	3;51
4.	"I Said"	4:23
5.	"Make Believe"	3:38
6.	"We All Will"	4:05
7.	"I Don't Care"	3:08
8.	"The Unwanted"	3:20
9.	"Heart Attack"	3:43
10.	"The Underrated"	3:18
Total length:		37:03

== Personnel ==
- Crispin Earl – lead vocals
- Dan Sittler – lead guitar, backing vocals
- Ryan Ramsdell – rhythm guitar
- Amal Wijayanayake – bass, screamed vocals
- Tyler Reimer – drums
