= Decade (disambiguation) =

A decade is a period of ten years.

Decade(s), Decad, Decadal or The Decade may also refer to:

== Groups of ten ==
- Decad (Sumerian texts), a standard sequence of ten scribal training compositions
- Decade (log scale), a factor of 10 difference between two numbers
- Cosmological decade, a division of the lifetime of the cosmos
- Decade, in the French Republican calendar, a period of 10 days
- Decade, in the Braille writing system, a grouping of 10 characters
- Decade, any of the repeated sequences of a rosary

== Arts and entertainment ==
=== Games and toys ===
- Decade (Beanie Baby), a 2003 bear toy
- Decade (solitaire), a card game
- Guitar Hero On Tour: Decades, a 2008 video game

=== Music ===
- Decad (chord) or decachord
- Decade (band), a British rock band 2009–2018

==== Albums ====
- A Decade, by Our Lady Peace, 2006
- Decade (Neil Young album), 1977
- Decade (Duran Duran album), 1989
- Decade (The Veer Union album), a studio album, 2016
  - Decade (Acoustic Sessions), an EP by the Veer Union, 2016
  - Decade: History of Our Evolution, a compilation album by the Veer Union, 2018
- Decade 1994–2004, by AZ, 2004
- Decade: "...but wait it gets worse", by Sticky Fingaz, 2003
- Decade (Live at the El Mocambo), by Silverstein, 2010
- Decade: Ten Years of Fierce Panda, 2004
- Decade, by Israel Houghton, 2012
- Decade, by Kerry Livgren, 1992
- Decade, by Rabbit in the Moon, 2007
- Decade, by Waltari, 1998
- Decade 1983–1993, by the Choirboys, 1993
- Decade 1998–2002 and Decade 2003–2007, by Dir En Grey, 2017
- Decade: Lift Up Your Eyes, by Planetshakers, 2005
- The Decade, an EP by Alesana, 2014
- The Decade (Day6 album), 2025
- Decades (David Palfreyman and Nicholas Pegg album), 2017
- Decades (Nightwish album), 2018
  - Decades: World Tour, a concert tour by Nightwish, 2018
  - Decades: Live in Buenos Aires, by Nightwish, 2019
- Decades (Motionless in White album), 2026

==== Songs ====
- "Decades", by Joy Division from Closer, 1980
- "Decades", by Joe Walsh from Songs for a Dying Planet, 1992

=== Theatre and television ===
- Decade (play), a 2011 British play marking the tenth anniversary of the September 11 attacks
- Decades (TV network), an American television network
- Kamen Rider Decade, a 2009 Japanese tokusatsu series

=== Literature ===
- Decades of the New World, a series of 1511–1530 Spanish historical chronicles

== Science ==
- Decadal survey, a report prioritizing specific goals of a scientific field for the coming decade
- Deep Earth Carbon Degassing Project (DECADE)

== Sports ==
- The Decade, a professional wrestling stable 2013–2016
- Decade, a trick in Flatland BMX

== See also ==
- 10 years (disambiguation)
- Century (disambiguation) (a period of 100 years)
