= 10 years =

10 Years or Ten Years may refer to:

- Decade, a period of ten years

== Film ==
- 10 Years (2011 film), a film starring Channing Tatum
- Ten Years (2015 film), a Hong Kong film

== Music ==
- 10 Years (band), an American alternative metal band
- 10 Years (Armin van Buuren album)
- 10 Years (Banco de Gaia album)
- Ten Years (EP), by Aly & AJ
- "10 Years" (song), by Daði Freyr and Gagnamagnið, 2021, representing Iceland in the Eurovision Song Contest 2021
- Ten Years, an album by Petra Haden and Woody Jackson
- "Ten Years", a song by Jack Clement, 1958
- "Ten Years", a song by Buddy Williams, 1960

== History ==
- The Ten Years, a period of the Eighty Years' War

== See also ==
- Decade (disambiguation)
- 10 Años (disambiguation)
- Ten Years Later (disambiguation)
