= 20 Años =

20 Años (Spanish; veinte años) or 20 Anos (Portuguese: Vinte anos); (English: 20 Years) may refer to:

== Music ==
=== Spanish-language albums ===
- 20 Años (Gian Marco album)
- 20 Años (Luis Miguel album)
- 20 Años Después, compilation released 20 years after death of Victor Jara
- 20 Años de Éxitos En Vivo con Moderatto, 2011 live album by Alejandra Guzmán
- 20 Años, by Alejandro Lerner
- 20 Años, by Extremoduro
- 20 Años, by Francisco Charro Avitia
- 20 Años, by Los Morros del Norte
- 20 Años, by Chilean singer Nicole
- 20 Años, by Siempre Así
- 20 Años Éxitos, by El Gran Combo
- 20 Años Éxitos, by Samuel Hernández

=== Portuguese-language albums ===
- 20 Anos, by Ivete Sangalo
- 20 Anos, by Joanna
- 20 Anos, by Quinta do Bill
- 20 Anos de Sucesso, by Zezé Di Camargo & Luciano
- 20 Anos de Sucesso, by To Zé Bit & Sonae

== See also ==
- 20 Years (disambiguation)
