= Origins (Bridge to Grace album) =

Studio album by Bridge to Grace
- Released: August 28, 2015
- Recorded: 2013–2015
- Genres: Post-grunge; hard rock; alternative metal
- Length: 67:04
- Label: Long Run Records
- Producer: Rick Beato

Origins is the debut studio album from American rock band Bridge to Grace. The album was released on 28 August 2015 via Long Run Records and was produced by Rick Beato.

== Background ==
In the latter half of 2013, the band released their initial EP, Staring in the Dark, produced by Rick Beato. Before creating this work, the ensemble recorded eight additional songs, whose recorded versions had been kept private. Garcia reported that the band chose to save the eight tunes and "ride [the] five songs out". To begin 2014, "The Fold", which was the debut single from the band, was released to radio.

In March 2015, the group released "Bitch", the second single overall from the ensemble. Five months later, the band published a music video for "Everything", a single from Origins, which was, at the time, to be the title of their first studio album. The album was then published three days later.

== Touring ==
In September 2015, the ensemble toured with Full Devil Jacket and performed throughout the United States that next month with American hard rock band Pop Evil. In early 2016, the group traveled the United States along with The Veer Union, Artifas and Bobaflex.

== Critical reception ==
Todd Jolicoeur of 100% Rock Magazine depicted the studio album as "ambitious, clocking in at over an hour" and "featuring seventeen tracks full of rock". Chris Gonda of PureGrainAudio, however, described the work as "loaded with tons of hooks, melody, heavy guitar, powerful musicianship, and outstanding singing".

== Track listing ==
| No. | Title | Length |
|---|---|---|
| 1. | "Take It All" | 4:06 |
| 2. | "Lost in Memories" (featured on Staring in the Dark EP) | 4:11 |
| 3. | "Everything" | 4:14 |
| 4. | "Left Inside" | 3:35 |
| 5. | "Weapon" | 3:50 |
| 6. | "Bitch" (featured on Staring in the Dark EP) | 3:56 |
| 7. | "Wasting My Time" | 3:33 |
| 8. | "No Lies" | 3:50 |
| 9. | "The Fold" (featured on Staring in the Dark EP) | 4:02 |
| 10. | "All I Want to Be" (featured on Staring in the Dark EP) | 4:14 |
| 11. | "Won't Let Go" | 4:01 |
| 12. | "Mercury" | 3:23 |
| 13. | "City of Angels" | 3:40 |
| 14. | "Staring in the Dark" (featured on Staring in the Dark EP) | 4:54 |
| 15. | "Adrenaline" | 3:22 |
| 16. | "Say What You Want" | 3:25 |
| 17. | "Until the World Ends" | 4:25 |
| Total length: | | 67:04 |

== Personnel ==
- David Garcia – lead vocals
- Alex Cabrera – lead guitar, piano, backing vocals
- Justin Little – drums, backing vocals
- Christian Lowenstein – bass
- Rick Beato – composer, producer
- Michael Loy – composer

== Singles ==
| Title | Year | Peak chart positions |
| Title | Year | Mainstream Rock |
|---|---|---|
| "The Fold" | 2013 | — |
| "Bitch" | 2015 | 35 |
| "Everything" | 2015 | 36 |
| "Left Inside" | 2016 | 30 |
