= Welcoming Home the Astronauts =

- Original 2000 cover

Studio album by Flickerstick
- Released: 2000 (rereleased June 19, 2001)
- Recorded: April, 2000
- Studio: Propulsion Laboratories (Dallas, Texas)
- Genre: Alternative rock
- Length: 57:47
- Label: 226 Records, Epic
- Producer: Todd Pipes

Flickerstick chronology
Welcoming Home the Astronauts (2000)	Tarantula (2004)

Welcoming Home the Astronauts is the debut album from Flickerstick. It was originally independently released in 2000 on 226 Records, but after the band won VH1's Bands on the Run, a reality television show for unsigned music acts, Flickerstick was signed by Sony, and the album was remixed and released by Epic.

The Sony/Epic re-release of the album features a number of musical & lyrical changes to the songs, as well as new artwork, a different track list order, removal of the song "Right Way to Fly", and addition of songs "Smile" and hidden bonus track "Execution by Christmas Lights".

Epic released from the album three singles: "Beautiful", "Smile", and "Coke", with both "Beautiful" and "Coke" receiving fan-requested radio airplay prior to the album's debut.

== Track listing ==
All songs written by Brandin Lea and Cory Kreig.

226 Records release:

1. "Lift (With Love We Will Survive)"
2. "Talk Show Host"
3. "Chloroform the One You Love"
4. "Coke"
5. "Beautiful"
6. "Sorry... Wrong Trajectory"
7. "You're so Hollywood"
8. "Got a Feeling"
9. "Hey or When the Drugs Wear Off "
10. "Right Way to Fly"
11. "Direct Line to the Telepathic"

Epic release:

1. "Lift (With Love We Will Survive)"
2. "Got a Feeling"
3. "Beautiful"
4. "Smile"
5. "Coke"
6. "Sorry... Wrong Trajectory"
7. "Chloroform the One You Love"
8. "You're so Hollywood"
9. "Talk Show Host"
10. "Hey or When the Drugs Wear Off"
11. "Direct Line to the Telepathic"
12. "Execution by X-mas Lights" – (hidden track)
