= Forty Foot Echo =

Canadian rock band

- Origin: Vancouver, British Columbia, Canada
- Genres: Post-grunge
- Years active: 2001–present
- Labels: Hollywood; Echoman
- Members: Murray Yates; Dayvid Swart; Mark Watson; George Allen; Kevin Bosch
- Past members: Peter Thorn; Rob Kurzreiter; Eric Schraeder; Mike Sanchez

Forty Foot Echo is a Canadian rock band formed in 2001 by lead singer and songwriter Murray Yates. The band released their debut album, Forty Foot Echo in 2003 on Hollywood Records, where they released two singles, "Save Me" and "Brand New Day", the latter appearing on the certified Gold selling Freaky Friday soundtrack as well. Troubles with the label led them to part ways in 2004, though Yates persevered, assembling a new band and releasing a follow-up album Aftershock in 2006. After a long hiatus, Yates reformed the band again in 2013 to release a third album, Returning, and announced plans to release further music in 2015 as well.

== History ==
=== Formation and debut self-titled album (2001–2004) ===
Forty Foot Echo's origin's trace back to the breakup of lead singer Murray Yates's prior band, Templar, which broke up in November 2001. Despite being without a band or a record label, Yates continued to write material by himself. Upon writing enough material, he began work with Canadian record producer Joey Moi. Yates was able to get another record label on the strength of the demos alone, signing to Hollywood Records. Upon signing the contract, Yates was tasked with forming the actual band, of which he recruited lead guitarist Pete Thorn, rhythm guitarist Eric Schraeder, bassist Miguel Sanchez, and drummer Rob Kurzreiter.

With the members assembled, they began work on recording an album as a band throughout 2002. Along with Moi, the band also worked with producer Jim Wirt, and had the album mixed by Tom Lord-Alge. The final product would be the self-titled Forty Foot Echo, released in 2003. Two singles were released from the album, "Save Me" and "Brand New Day", both receiving music videos that entered the rotations of music channels such as Much Music. "Brand New Day" was also included on the Freaky Friday soundtrack. This proved to be a good source of exposure for the band, as the soundtrack itself debuted at no. 19 on the Billboard 200 charts, and ended up getting a Gold certification by the RIAA, indicating over 500,000 copies shipped. Additionally, the song "Drift" was used in the feature film The Prince and Me and its respective soundtrack in 2004, as well as the track "Beside Me", which was featured on the first episode of the television series One Tree Hill. Despite the band's accomplishments and growing exposure, budget cuts and loss of touring support lead to the band parting ways with Hollywood in 2004.

=== Independent releases (2005–present) ===
Despite the loss of another record label, Yates decided to push forward with the Forty Foot Echo, albeit without any of the original members returning. Schraeder in particular moved on to being the guitarist of The Veer Union to record their debut album Time to Break the Spell. Yates continued to work with Kurzwreiter in a short-lived side-project band called "Caught Crimson", but eventually assembled an entirely new band to record their second album on his own, independent label "Echoman Records in 2007, titled Aftershock. With failing to leave a mark with their second release, the band entered an extended hiatus until 2012, when Yates decided to re-release Aftershock with a revised track list featuring four substitute songs, and a completely re-recorded version of "Brand New Day". For a variety of artistic and political reasons, Yates felt the song had to be redone so that he could truly reclaim it as his own, with his own vision for the song finally realized. Building on that momentum, Yates recorded a third album under the name, Returning, released in 2013. The album introduced more elements of electronic music while keeping within the constraints of the band's traditional modern rock sound.

In September 2014, the band released a new track called "Take Back Revolution". In January 2015, the band announced their intentions to release a new EP in 2015.

== Band members ==
Current

- Murray Yates - lead vocals
- Mark Watson - guitar, backing vocals
- David Kanderka - bass, backing vocals
- Ricardo Viana - drums

Former

- Peter Thorn - lead guitar, backing vocals
- Eric Schraeder - rhythm guitar, background vocals
- Mike Sanchez - bass
- Rob Kurzreiter - drums
- Matty Dee - bass

== Discography ==
Studio albums

- Forty Foot Echo (2003)
- Aftershock (2007)
- Returning (2013)
