= Yael Eisenstat =

American national security specialist and strategist

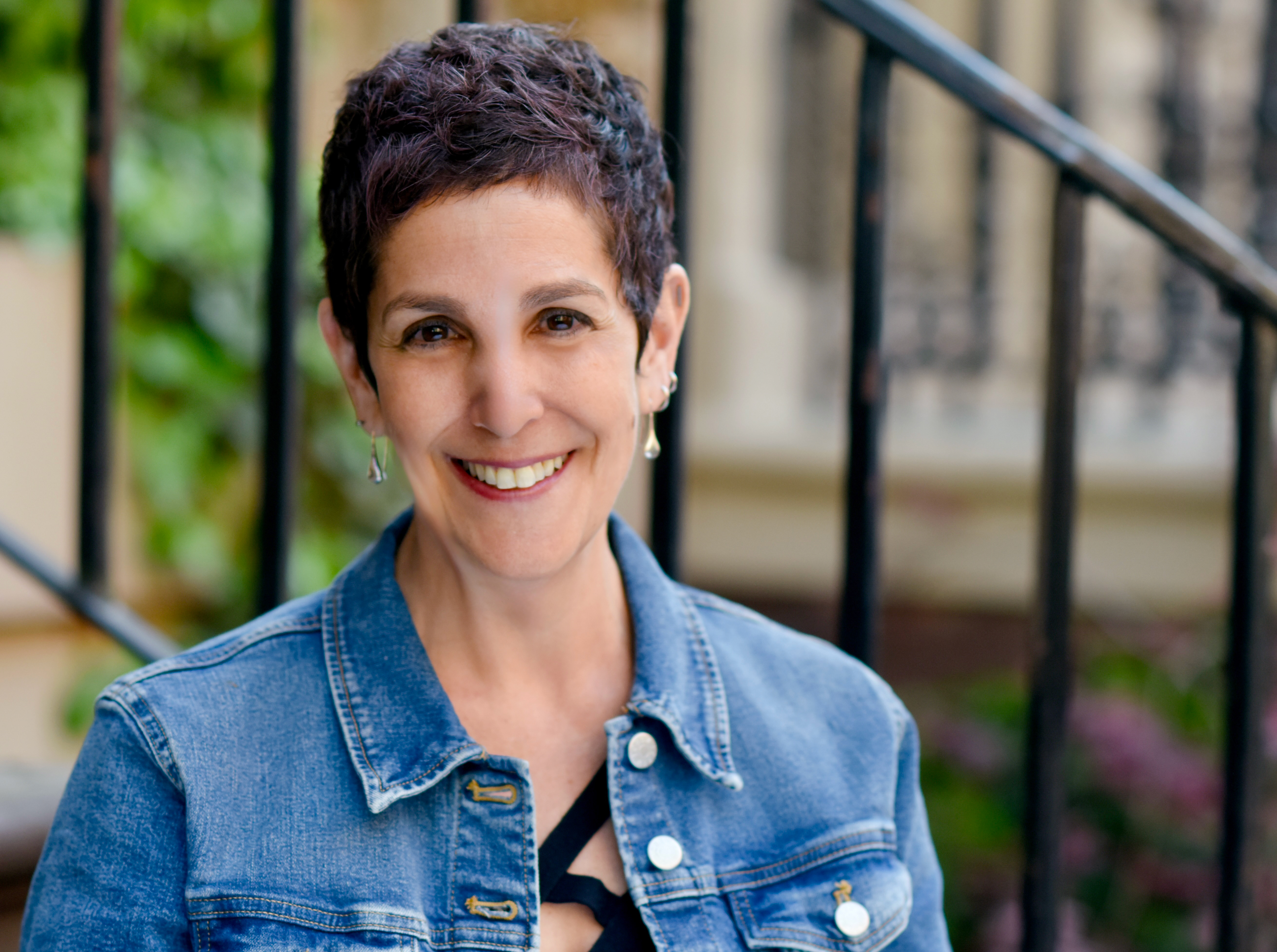
- Education: University of California, Davis (BA); Johns Hopkins University (MA)
- Website: Official website

Yaël D. Eisenstat is an American democracy activist and technology policy expert who has spent over two decades combatting extremism, polarization, and anti-democratic behavior both on- and offline. With experience as one the United States government's top counterextremism officials and as Facebook's former Global Head of Elections Integrity Ops, Eisenstat is best known for being a pioneering voice in shaping public understanding of the ways in which social media contributes to polarization and radicalization.

Eisenstat currently serves as Director of Policy and Impact at Cybersecurity Research Center (formerly Cybersecurity for Democracy), a nonpartisan, independent research institution that exposes online threats to democracy and proposes research-based policy insights on how best to combat them. There, her work focuses on democratic discourse on major social media platforms, AI-powered political messaging, and open information sharing practices in advance of the 2024 presidential election. Before this, Eisenstat served as Vice President to the Anti-Defamation League, where she led the ADL Center for Technology & Society from September 2022 through January 2024.

Prior to her tenure at the Anti-Defamation League, Eisenstat served as the Senior Advisor for Tech and Democracy at the Institute for Security and Technology, and as a Future of Democracy Fellow at the Berggruen Institute. She is a former Central Intelligence Agency officer, National Security Advisor to former Vice President Joe Biden, and diplomat. In 2019 and 2020, she was a visiting fellow at Cornell Tech, where she examined and taught on the impact of technology on media and democracy. From 2017 to 2019, she was an adjunct assistant professor at the Center for Global Affairs at New York University. Between June and November 2018, she was the Global Head of Elections Integrity Ops for political advertising at Facebook. She has become a vocal critic of the company since leaving and is known for her efforts to promote social media platform transparency and accountability. On Twitter, Wall Street Journal technology reporter Jeff Horwitz described Eisenstat as having "expanded the Overton window of former employee behavior and likely encouraged others to take risks and document what they saw."

== Education ==
Eisenstat holds a B.A. in International Relations from the University of California, Davis and an M.A. in International Affairs and African Studies from the Paul H. Nitze School of Advanced International Studies at Johns Hopkins University.

== Career ==
As head of the Anti-Defamation League Center for Technology & Society, Yaёl led the ADL's effort to hold tech companies accountable for the proliferation of hate, harassment, and extremism on their platforms, and to promote transparency into how social media platforms' own tools, design practices, and business decisions perpetuate harm.

In addition to advocating for change on the part of tech industry actors, Eisenstat's ADL leadership also sought to uplift the voices and experiences of those most impacted by online hate and harassment, and much of her work concerns the intersection between online hate and harassment and its impacts on women, people of color, and other historically marginalized communities. In her August 2023 address the Women's Assembly at the 2023 Parliament of the World's Religions, Eisenstat recounted of her experience at Facebook, "I witnessed the alarming proliferation of disinformation campaigns designed to deceive and manipulate voters. These campaigns exploited existing fault lines in society, stoking hatred and division, and they used the very tools that Facebook and other social media companies offered to accomplish these goals. Unsurprisingly, women, in particular, were often targeted with gender-based disinformation and toxic content, aimed at undermining their credibility and suppressing their voices. Time and again, I raised these concerns internally at Facebook, and time and again, they overlooked the urgency of these threats. So I knew it was my duty to raise the alarm, and I did."

As a former CIA analyst and Foreign Service Officer, Eisenstat has worked in many different government agencies, specializing particularly on national security issues in the Middle East and Africa. For nearly a decade, she has worked in counterterrorism and intelligence at the Central Intelligence Agency. From 2004 to 2006, she was a Foreign Service Officer in Nairobi, Kenya, and became Senior Intelligence Officer at the National Counterterrorism Center from 2006 to 2009. In 2009, she was appointed as Special Advisor to Vice President Joe Biden in national security affairs. One year later, she worked as an embedded analyst for the Joint Terrorism Task Force in New York. Eisenstat then spent two years working at ExxonMobil in Irving, Texas from 2013 to 2015.

She founded political risk firm Kilele Global in 2016 and is a member of the Council on Foreign Relations.

In 2017, Yaël Eisenstat was included in Forbes' list of "40 Women to Watch Over 40."

From June to November 2018, Yaël Eisenstat was the global head of elections integrity ops for political advertising at Facebook. She has become a vocal critic of the company since leaving.

In 2019, she was Policy Advisor for the Center for Humane Technology, as well as visiting fellow at Cornell Tech's Digital Life Initiative.

Eisenstat is frequently sought out for expert testimony on issues of online election integrity. In November 2023, she was invited to testify at one of the AI Insight Forums, led by Senate Majority Leader Charles "Chuck" Schumer, in her capacity as an online democracy advocate. Eisenstat's written and oral testimony included calls to improve access to authentic and verifiable information, to promote transparency by AI developers, and to increase industry actors' incentives to prioritize public trust and user safety on their platforms.

Eisenstat is a noted advocate for changes to Section 230 of the Communications Decency Act, which automatically immunizes social media companies from liability for most harms that arise on their platforms. Eisenstat has not called for repeal of Section 230, but instead argues that it must be updated to reflect today's technological landscape.

== Media ==
Eisenstat has written for many major newspapers and magazines, including for the New York Times and Time. She has also appeared on CNN, BBC, and other televised news networks. She has been publicly critical of some of Facebook's activities and written outspoken pieces on the company as well as given interviews on it, including about online voter suppression.

In her articles for the New York Times and the Huffington Post, Eisenstat has criticized President Donald Trump's January 2017 speech to the Central Intelligence Agency as disrespectful and self-serving. In August 2025, she was one of 37 former intelligence officials who had their security clearances revoked at Trump's direction.

Her TED Talk "How Facebook Profits from Polarization" was published online in August 2020.

On 25 September 2020, Eisenstat was named as one of the 25 members of the "Real Facebook Oversight Board", an independent monitoring group over Facebook.

== See also ==
- Center for Humane Technology
