= PJA =

PJA may refer to

- PJA-TV
- Plain Jane Automobile
- Progressive Jewish Alliance
