= WDDW =

Radio station in Sturtevant, Wisconsin

- Sturtevant, Wisconsin; United States
- Broadcast area: Milwaukee-Racine
- Frequency: 104.7 MHz (HD Radio)
- Branding: La Gran D 104.7

Programming
- Format: Traditional regional Mexican music
- Subchannels: HD2: Regional Mexican "La Z 93.7"

Ownership
- Owner: Bustos Media; (Bustos Media of Wisconsin, LLC)

History
- First air date: June 18, 1993; 33 years ago (as WZXA)
- Former call signs: WZXA (1989–1997); WEXT (1997–2005)

Technical information
- Licensing authority: FCC
- Facility ID: 53506
- Class: A
- ERP: 4,200 watts
- HAAT: 103 meters (338 ft)
- Transmitter coordinates: 42.856°N 87.845°W
- Translator: HD2: 93.7 W229CQ (Milwaukee)

Links
- Public license information: Public file; LMS
- Website: laradiodemilwaukee.com

WDDW (104.7 MHz) is a Spanish-language FM radio station licensed to Sturtevant, Wisconsin, and serving Milwaukee and Racine. It is owned by Bustos Media, with studios at 2430 S 28th Street, 2nd floor in Milwaukee. WDDW is known as "La Gran D" (sounded out as "La Grande", using the Spanish pronunciation of the letter "D"), and plays traditional Regional Mexican music.

WDDW is a Class A station with an effective radiated power (ERP) of 4,200 watts. Its transmitter is atop the former WMLW-TV tower northwest of the Oak Creek Power Plant in Oak Creek. WDDW broadcasts using HD Radio technology. Its HD2 digital subchannel carries a mix of Regional Mexican music with some current and recent hits, as "La Z 93.7". It feeds 250-watt FM translator W229CQ on 93.7 MHz. Its tower is atop the Hilton Milwaukee City Center. Both signals target Milwaukee's south side Hispanic neighborhoods.

== History ==
=== Hot adult contemporary (1993–1997) ===
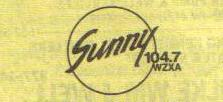
Logo as "Sunny 104.7" WZXA

The frequency was granted a construction permit on September 26, 1989, using the call sign WZXA. It signed on the air on June 18, 1993. The station aired a mixture of satellite and local hot adult contemporary music as "Sunny 104". It targeted Racine and Kenosha with its transmitter site in Franksville, Wisconsin. The station was owned by Pride Communications.

=== Country (1997–2005) ===
In the spring of 1997, WZXA flipped to country music as WEXT "Extreme Country 104.7". Pride Communications was sold to NextMedia Group in 2000, though no major format changes were made.

In February 2004, NextMedia turned on a new Oak Creek transmitter, which gave the station an improved signal into the Milwaukee area. The format was tweaked on March 6, 2004, when it evolved into a mixture of current and classic country as "104-7 The Wolf". Instead of a jingle, The Wolf would usually play a wolf howling between songs.

=== Regional Mexican (2005–present) ===
On October 13, 2005, Bustos Media agreed to purchase the station from NextMedia Group for $10.2 million. Bustos specializes in formats targeting Hispanics and it planned to make 104.7 a Spanish-language station. On September 15, 2005, prior to Bustos taking over the station, WEXT dropped its country format and began redirecting listeners to Milwaukee country station WMIL-FM. To advertise the end that morning, The Wolf replaced the wolf-howling sound effect with the sound of a dying wolf. WEXT signed off with Blackhawk's "Goodbye Says It All". The station then began simulcasting co-owned WIIL in Kenosha.

The station switched its call sign to WDDW and launched the next day after a promotional loop aired for approximately 24 hours. It became the Milwaukee area's first full-time Spanish language FM station. At 11:50 that morning, the Milwaukee Hispanic Chamber Of Commerce officially launched the station with the song "El Aretito" by Los Morros del Norte. The initial broadcast came a couple hours later than the intended 10:00 a.m. launch to set up a new temporary studio in Kenosha.

In September 2010, Bustos transferred most of its licenses to Adelante Media Group as part of a settlement with its lenders. Bustos Media bought WDDW back from Adelante for $1 million on July 31, 2015.

=== HD Radio ===
In July 2016, WDDW launched an HD2 digital subchannel carrying older music. An earlier upgrade to the transmitter allowed WDDW to begin HD radio operations. That subchannel in turn feeds FM translator W229CQ 93.7 from downtown Milwaukee.

The signal and subchannel signed on in mid-July with a loop of "Macarena" by Los Del Río before "La Z 93.7" launched at 5:42 PM on July 21. The signal is directed southward to prevent interference with Sheboygan's WBFM and Grand Rapids' WBCT on the same frequency.

Broadcast translator for WDDW-HD2
Call sign	Frequency	City of license	FID	ERP (W)	Class	Transmitter coordinates	FCC info
W229CQ	93.7 FM	Milwaukee, Wisconsin	146071	250	D	43°2′18″N 87°54′7″W	LMS
