= Brand New Day =

Brand New Day or A Brand New Day may refer to:

== Music ==
- Brand New Day, the American title for the 1990 Australian musical Bran Nue Dae

=== Albums ===
- Brand New Day (Swollen Members album), 2014
- Brand New Day (Ricki-Lee Coulter album), or the title song
- Brand New Day (Sting album), or the title song, 1999
- Brand New Day (The Watchmen album)
- Brand New Day (Blood, Sweat & Tears album)
- Brand New Day (The Mavericks)
- A Brand New Day (album), by Vanessa Bell Armstrong
- A Brand New Day, by Lime
- A Brand New Day, by Frankie Laine, or the title song

=== Songs ===
- "Brand New Day" (Massari song), 2012
- "Brand New Day" (Sting song)
- "Brand New Day" (Van Morrison song), 1970
- "Brand New Day" (Kodaline song), 2013
- "A Brand New Day" (The Wiz song), from the musical The Wiz
- "A Brand New Day" (BTS and Zara Larsson song)
- "Brand New Day", by 10cc from The Original Soundtrack
- "Brand New Day", by Aice^{5}
- "Brand New Day" by Alex Lloyd, 2006
- "Brand New Day", by Babymetal from Metal Galaxy
- "Brand New Day", by Bryan Adams from Get Up
- "Brand New Day", by Demi Lovato from The Final Jam
- "Brand New Day", by Dizzee Rascal from Boy in da Corner
- "Brand New Day", by Eurythmics from Savage
- "Brand New Day", by Fireflight from Unbreakable
- "Brand New Day", by Forty Foot Echo from Forty Foot Echo
- "Brand New Day", by Joshua Radin from Simple Times
- "Brand New Day", by Miguel Migs from Colorful You
- "Brand New Day", by No Doubt from No Doubt
- "Brand New Day", by Ryan Star from the television show Lie to Me
- "Brand New Day", by Scoopers from Sakura Gakuin 2010 Nendo: Message
- "Brand New Day", from the film Dr. Horrible's Sing-Along Blog
- "A Brand New Day", from the video game The Jungle Book Groove Party

== Film ==
- Brand New Day, the American title for the 2009 Australian musical film Bran Nue Dae
- Love Happens (working title: Brand New Day), a 2009 American film starring Jennifer Aniston and Aaron Eckhart
- Sound! Euphonium: The Movie – Our Promise: A Brand New Day, a 2019 Japanese animated film
- Spider-Man: Brand New Day, a 2026 American film sharing the name of the comic book storyline

== Other media ==
- Brand New Day (comics), a 2008 comic book storyline in The Amazing Spider-Man
- "A Brand New Day", a storyline in the science fiction comedy webtoon series Live with Yourself!
- Brand New Day (Agents of S.H.I.E.L.D.), an episode of the American television series Agents of S.H.I.E.L.D.
