= Templar (band) =

Canadian alternative rock band

- Origin: Vancouver, British Columbia, Canada
- Genres: Alternative rock, electronica
- Years active: 1998–2001
- Label: EMI Records
- Past members: Murray Yates; Will C. Scott Switzer; Nik Pesut

Templar were a Canadian alternative rock band from Vancouver, British Columbia, most noted for garnering a Juno Award nomination for Best New Group at the Juno Awards of 2001.

The band was formed in 1998 by vocalist Murray Yates and guitarist Will C., and fused hard rock and electronica influences in a manner commonly compared by critics to Econoline Crush. The band took its name from Simon Templar, the lead character in the crime novel and film series The Saint. They released their debut album, Under the Sun, on EMI Records in 2000; the album featured the singles "The Need" and "Here We Go" the latter of which was featured in NHL 2001. The band performed in Toronto in October that year with Limblifter and Edwin.

Due to creative tensions, the band broke up in late 2001 while working on their second album. Yates went on to form Forty Foot Echo.
