= Bees Saal Baad =

Bees Saal Baad (lit. 'Twenty Years Later') may refer to these Indian Hindi-language films:

- Bees Saal Baad (1962 film), starring Biswajeet and Waheeda Rehman
- Bees Saal Baad (1988 film), starring Mithun Chakraborty, Dimple Kapadia and Meenakshi Sheshadri

== See also ==
- 20 Years (disambiguation)
- Ten Years Later (disambiguation)
- Bees Saal Pehle (lit. 'Twenty Years Ago'), a 1972 Indian Hindi-language film
