= Flickerstick =

American alternative rock band

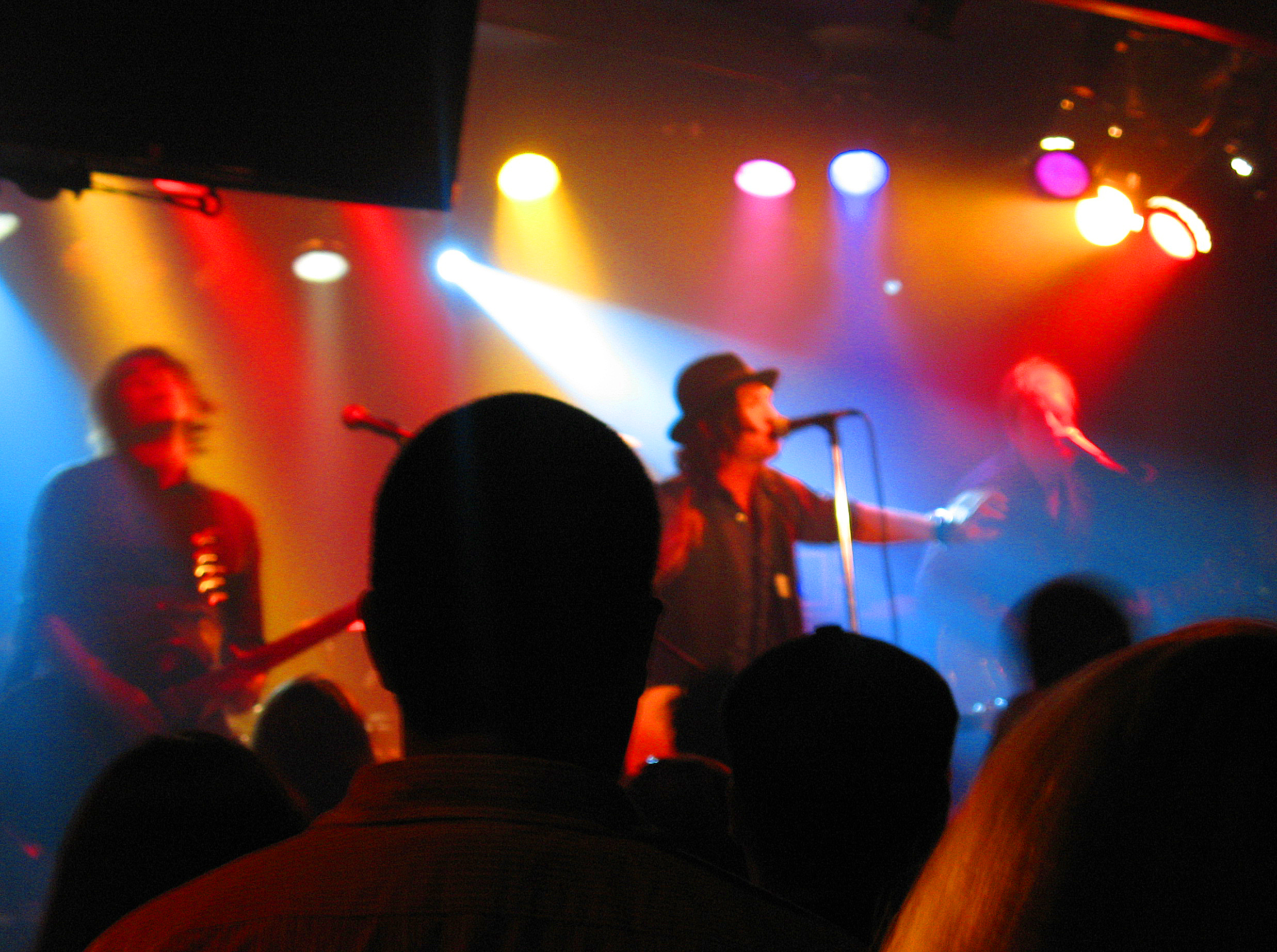
- Flickerstick-Viper-Room-LA

Background information
- Origin: Fort Worth, Texas, United States
- Genres: Alternative rock
- Years active: 1997–2009, 2022–present
- Labels: Idol Records; Epic Records; What Are Records
- Members: Brandin Lea; Rex Ewing; Todd Harwell; Beau Wagener; Fatima Thomas
- Past members: Fletcher Lea; Cory Kreig; Dominic Weir; Jeff Lowe; Tim Locke

Flickerstick is an American alternative rock band from Fort Worth, Texas, formed in 1997. The band rose to national attention in 2001 by winning VH1's reality competition series Bands on the Run, after which it signed with Epic Records and reissued its album Welcoming Home the Astronauts. Flickerstick disbanded in 2009 before reuniting in 2022.

== Band history ==
=== Band formation and early years ===
Flickerstick was formed in Fort Worth, Texas, by high school friends Brandin Lea (lead singer, guitarist) and Cory Kreig (guitarist, keyboardist). The two, who were guitarists in another local band, decided to put a band together and picked some friends to join them, including drummer Jeff Lowe. Brandin's brother, Fletcher (bassist) joined later and the band started doing local gigs. In 1997, the band self-produced and recorded their first album titled Chloroform The One You Love.

The band played clubs in Dallas, adding Dallas-based drummer Dominic Weir in 1998, who started playing shows. The band borrowed $10,000 and made their second album titled Welcoming Home the Astronauts. The album sold in the Dallas area and at shows, and the band received local airplay. In early 1999, guitarist Rex James Ewing joined the band. Founding member Kreig has said that that's when they "hit [their] stride" thinking, "Hey, we have something here."

=== VH1's Bands on the Run ===
During this time, VH1 invited them to audition for the Bands on the Run television show, after initial interest in them for a show about bands that include relatives. After auditioning among over 2,000 bands, Flickerstick was chosen to be one of the four in the series. The winner was to be the band that made the most money at the door and from merchandise sales, with a "battle of the bands" before each elimination of the lowest-earning band, with the winner (chosen by audience vote) protected from elimination. Flickerstick won the first two "battle of the bands" to avoid elimination, and was lagging in sales by well over $3,000.00 in the final episode, when it was announced that Guitar Center was offering a purse of $5,000.00 for the winner of the final "battle." The votes for the winner were cast by audience members each worth one point, then a private group of music insiders each voted with a worth of 5 points each. It was announced that Flickerstick won that final "battle" and the grand prize for the series.

=== Post-show ===
After six months of shows, the band was signed by Epic Records. In November 2001, Epic re-released Welcoming Home the Astronauts which received reviews in Rolling Stone (3.5 out of 5 stars) along with moderate to well received reviews in other music publications. The album was re-worked with the help of veteran producer Rick Beato and was remixed by Tom Lord-Alge. The reissued album debuted at #2 on the Billboard Heatseekers chart and #150 on the Billboard Top 200.

Flickerstick was in New York City on September 11, 2001, for a sold-out show at the famed Irving Plaza. In an interview with Rock Eyez a local New Jersey music blog, Brandin Lea stated that being in New York on 9/11 was "horrific" and that would be the one thing he would change from the band's career. In other interviews, members of the band have cited the change in the record industry and economy in general (resulting in Epic's lackluster promotion of the album) after the 9/11 terrorist attacks as reasons for their departure with Epic.

A year later their Epic contract was canceled out for an undisclosed amount, and the band bought ownership of the album from the label. They then signed with What Are Records and released a live album titled Causing a Catastrophe that same year. After the album's release drummer Dominic Weir was fired from the band for personality conflicts. After his dismissal he continued to play with another project, Mermaid Purse, before eventually joining Smile Empty Soul. He was replaced in Flickerstick by ex-Doosu drummer Todd Harwell.

On October 14, 2003, Flickerstick self-released an EP/DVD combo entitled To Madagascar and Back.

=== Final years and breakup ===
On October 5, 2004, Flickerstick released their second album Tarantula on the Dallas-based indie label Idol Records. The band had toured statewide as well as the UK in support of the record. Founding guitarist Cory Kreig left the band in April 2005 towards the end of the tour for personal reasons. Brandin was able to recruit veteran songwriter Tim Locke, who also handled lead vocals and guitar for Dallas-based alternative band Coma Rally and alt-country band Calhoun, to fill Cory's place in the band.

On April 3, 2007, the band released Live from Atlanta: Two Nights at Sound Tree Studios which was named as a result of a two-day, fan-invite recording weekend in September 2006 at Tree Sound Studios in Atlanta. Fans joined the band at night in a live recording room at the studio, and celebrated being part of the band's live taping sessions. The album featured six new songs that had not been recorded before. The album also featured a special studio track called "Helicopter," along with three videos from the recording sessions in September. The record was engineered by industry veteran Shawn Grove.

Rumors of breakup gained momentum after the band's website was taken offline for nonpayment in July 2008. It was confirmed by the band on their MySpace page in January 2009 with the following statement:

"After a decade's worth of playing, the time has come for us to pack it up and say goodbye. Throughout these years, our greatest reward has been the dedication and support of our fans. We simply could not have lasted this long without you, Flickerstick fans. ... We’ve had some very good times together, and we will miss all of you."

After a hiatus of more than a year, the band (minus bassist Fletcher Lea) resurfaced to perform a series of farewell shows:

=== Reunion ===
On October 22, 2021, Flickerstick released When We Were Young: Singles, B-Sides & Rarities, 1997–2004. Around this release, the band's long dormant Twitter and Facebook began receiving regular posts of archival content, much of it never before seen.

On November 15, 2021, the band reunited in the same room for the first time since 2005 to celebrate the re-release of Welcoming Home the Astronauts, discuss their touring years and address rumors of a comeback with Fort Worth Magazine.

Regarding a reunion, Lea said,

"Playing with them again, even just one last show, would mean the world to me; and I know, thanks to social media, that a whole lot of people out there agree with me on that."

Fletcher, Weir and Kreig expressed a willingness to consider reunion shows as well.

On January 4, 2022, it was announced on Flickerstick official social media posts that the band would be reuniting for one show with all 5 original band members. The reunion concert took place at the House of Blues in Dallas Texas on June 25, 2022. Due to popular demand, the band added a second performance to the reunion, which took place at the same venue on June 24, 2022.

On June 18, 2022, it was announced on the band's official facebook page that the reunion would proceed past the 2 announced reunion shows. Brandin, Rex and Todd would be reuniting with fellow DFW musician Beau Wagener and vocalist & bass guitarist Fatima Thomas joining the band as well. On September 11, the new line-up released their first single titled "Shine On." In November 2025, Flickerstick released Superluminal, its first album of new material in over two decades.

== Band members ==
=== Current members ===
- Brandin Lea – vocals, guitar (1997-2009, 2022-present)
- Rex Ewing – rhythm and lead guitar, vocals (1999-2009, 2022-present)
- Todd Harwell – drums, percussion (2002-2009, 2022-present)
- Beau Wagener – lead and rhythm guitar, vocals (2022-present)
- Fatima Thomas – bass guitar, vocals (2022-present)

=== Former members ===
- Jeff Lowe – drums, percussion (1997-1998)
- Dominic Weir – drums, percussion (1998-2002, 2022)
- Cory Kreig – lead and rhythm guitar, keyboards, vocals (1997-2005, 2022)
- Fletcher Lea – bass guitar (1997-2009, 2022)
- Tim Locke – lead and rhythm guitar, vocals (2005-2009)

== Discography ==
Studio

- Chloroform the One You Love (1997)
- Welcoming Home the Astronauts (2001)
- Tarantula (2004)
- Superluminal (2025)

EP

- To Madagascar and Back (2003)
- Contract Killers (2023)

Live

- Causing a Catastrophe (2002)
- Live from Atlanta: Two Nights at Sound Tree Studios (2007)

Compilation

- When We Were Young: Singles, B-Sides & Rarities, 1997–2004 (2021)

Singles

- Shine On (2022)
