= Divide the Blackened Sky =

Studio album by The Veer Union
- Released: March 26, 2012
- Recorded: 2012
- Genre: Hard rock, post-grunge alternative rock
- Length: 32:15
- Label: Rocket Science/RED
- Producer: The Veer Union

The Veer Union chronology
Against the Grain (2009)	''Divide the Blackened Sky'' (2012)	Decade (2016)

Singles from Divide the Blackened Sky
- 1. "Bitter End" Released: February 2012

Divide the Blackened Sky is the third album from hard rock band The Veer Union (albeit only the second one under their current name, as their first album, Time to Break the Spell, was recorded when they were known as simply "Veer"). The majority of the album was self-produced, written and recorded by the band. Lyrically, the album focuses on the band struggling with and overcoming adversity, namely, being dropped from their major record label contract after their prior album, Against the Grain. One single from the album, "Bitter End", was released in March 2012.

== Background and recording ==
After the band released their second album, Against the Grain, in 2009, and toured in support of it throughout 2010, they were dropped from their record label Universal Motown Records. While the band had written much of the album shortly after being let go from the label, progress was held up for eight months due to legal issues arising from leaving the label. Additionally, while it was not announced until February 2012, much earlier second guitarist James Fiddler and bassist Marc Roots decided they would be leaving the band. Band founder and guitarist Eric Schraeder said of the situation:

At the end of the day, this is how the whole band started, with Crispin and I's vision. It was weird and kind of surreal to find that six years later through a record deal, through all the stuff we had been through, we were kind of back at square one again. It was kind of crazy sitting there back in Vancouver, literally without a band...There was a lot of down time within leaving the record label and finding a new home, and recording the new record, And in that time you know, people grow apart. people have different views and different thoughts on the way their lives should be lived "

Despite this, Schraeder and the other co-founder, vocalist Crispin Earl, decided to continue on with the album, announcing their intention that they would be working on releasing the album in 2011, even without major record label support. Fiddler and Roots would still contribute and play on the album, but would not tour in support of the album after release. The two left amicably, with Schraeder stating they're still in weekly contact. Roots was replaced by the band's bass tech, Winston Wolfe. Fiddler was not replaced at all, with the band opting to continue on as a quartet.

The album was primarily self-produced, although they did receive some help from Brian Howes on the track "Bitter End" and from sound engineer Jason Vanpeoderooyen. Earl stated that working as an independent band had its negatives and positives. Earl and Schraeder had to put down roughly $100,000 of their own money to finance the album. However, at the same time, they both enjoyed the creative freedom of making the album they truly wanted, not having to submit to demands of a record label. The album was recorded in eight different studios in two countries. They initially aimed for a November 2011 release, but the date was later pushed back into March 2012.

== Writing and composition ==
Lyrically, the album is centered around the hopelessness and desperation Earl and Schraeder felt after starting fresh without record label support or past bandmates. Earl also identified his frustrations with the poor current state of rock music popularity in general as another contributor to the lyrics. Earl referred to the album as "conceptual sounding album" of "hard times", and would elsewhere say of the album:

I would say that this record is about the all the twists and turns that life has taken us on emotionally over the last few years going through label changes and member changes. Sonically and lyrically this record is just a little more pissed off and raw to the core. I think what drives me to write is every experience that I have lived through whether its good or bad. Through every turn Eric and I experienced through the process of writing this record it seemed like forces of nature were against us causing the record to possibly never see the light of day, but every time that happened we would just write about that moment and keep going. Hence the title of the record Divide The Blackened Sky."

The track "I Will Remain" took the band multiple years to write.

Earl and Schraeder aimed to make the album sound much more heavy, dark, and gritty than their prior album, Against the Grain. They emphasized moving in a more "rock' direction, staying away from any ballads.

== Release and promotion ==
In 2011, they held a contest to have fans submit artwork to be picked to be on the album's front cover. A week prior to the album release, the band released the album to be streamed in its entirety online, and released a special iPhone App that provided news and media to the public. The album was finally released on March 26, 2012,. and charted at no. 33 on Billboard's Heatseekers Albums chart.

The band went on a 3-month North American tour that spanned April through June 2012, touring with Korn, Staind, Buckcherry, and My Darkest Days.

A deluxe edition of the album, with three additional tracks, was released in June 2014.

== Reception ==
The album received generally positive reviews. Lithium Magazine "highly recommended" the album, praising it for having "...a dark, edgy, hard rock vibe, and convey[ing] a clear story of difficult times and anguish, but also of hope and a determination to succeed." Alternative Addiction reviewed it similarly, describing it as "darker, heavier and altogether better than its predecessor" and described many of the songs as "the equivalent of an iron fist in a velvet glove; brutal yet swathed in melody". Hard Rock Hideout gave the album an 8 out of 10: "Hard rocking power riffs, strong vocals, and excellent drum beats all combine to make Divide The Blackened Sky an excellent release." Metalholics similarly gave it 8 out 10, praising the band's progress over time: "definitely much darker, edgier and heavier...the music has more grit and...lower tones, their sound has an infectious groove but you also hear a sense of maturity." Loudwire gave the album 4 out of 5, praising it for being "a blend of teeth-grating rhythms and commercial melodies that are heavy enough to appeal to the hard rock fan while rarely too vicious or overindulgent". The New Review gave 3.5 out of 5, giving special praise to the vocals but saying the album still may have stayed a little too "inside the box". The album was noted for showing growth in the band's songwriting, musicianship, and performance. and overall being a better album than their prior one, Against the Grain.

== Track listing ==
All tracks are written by Crispin Earl and Eric Schraeder

No.	Title	Length
1.	"Borderline"	2:42
2.	"Bitter End"	3:36
3.	"I Will Remain"	2:50
4.	"Buried in the Ground"	2:22
5.	"Inside Our Scars"	3:28
6.	"Live Another Day"	3:13
7.	"Divide the Blackened Sky"	3:26
8.	"Silent Gun"	3:08
9.	"Last Days of Life"	3:23
10.	"Stolen"	3:33
Total length:		32:15

Bonus tracks
No.	Title	Length
11.	"Bitter End (Acoustic)"	3:42
12.	"Borderline (Acoustic)"	3:04
13.	"Live Another Day (Acoustic)"	3:32

Deluxe Edition (2014)
No.	Title	Length
1.	"Borderline feat. Jonny Hetherington"	2:43
2.	"Bitter End"	3:41
3.	"I Will Remain"	2:55
4.	"Buried in the Ground"	2:26
5.	"Inside Our Scars"	3:33
6.	"Live Another Day"	3:18
7.	"Safe and Sound"	3:45
8.	"Divide the Blackened Sky"	3:31
9.	"Silent Gun"	3:12
10.	"Last Days of Life"	3:28
11.	"Stolen"	3:36
12.	"The Antagonist"	4:04
13.	"No Hope Till Now"	4:02

== Personnel ==
Band

- Crispin Earl – lead vocals
- Eric Schraeder – rhythm guitar, vocals
- Neil Beaton – drums
- James Fiddler – lead guitar, background vocals
- Marc Roots – bass

Production

- Producer – The Veer Union, "Bitter End" by Brian Howes
- Mixed by Jay Van Poederooyen
