= Forty Foot Echo (album) =

Studio album by Forty Foot Echo
- Released: May 20, 2003
- Recorded: 2002–2003
- Genre: Post-grunge
- Length: 41:04
- Label: Hollywood
- Producer: Jim Wirt

Forty Foot Echo chronology
Forty Foot Echo (2003)	Aftershock (2006)

Forty Foot Echo is the debut album by Canadian rock band Forty Foot Echo. It was released on May 20, 2003 by record label Hollywood Records.

== Background and recording ==
Initial work on the album trace back to the breakup of lead singer Murray Yates's prior band, Templar, which broke up in November 2001. Despite being without a band or a record label, Yates continued to write material by himself. Upon writing enough material, he began work with Canadian record producer Joey Moi. Yates was able to get another record label on the strength of the demos alone, signing to Hollywood Records. Upon signing the contract, Yates was tasked with forming the actual band, of which he recruited lead guitarist Pete Thorn, rhythm guitarist Eric Schraeder, bassist Miguel Sanchez, and drummer Rob Kurzreiter. With the members assembled, they began work on recording an album as a band throughout 2002. Along with Moi, the band also worked with producer Jim Wirt, and had the album mixed by Tom Lord-Alge.

== Release and promotion ==
The album was finally released in 2003. Two singles would be released from the album, "Save Me" and "Brand New Day", both receiving music videos that entered the rotations of music channels such as Much Music. "Brand New Day" was also included on the Freaky Friday soundtrack. This proved to be a good source of exposure for the band, as the soundtrack itself debuted at no. 19 on the Billboard 200 charts, and ended up getting a Gold certification by the RIAA, indicating over 500,000 copies shipped. Additionally, the song "Drift" was used in the feature film The Prince and Me and its respective soundtrack in 2004, and the first episode of the television series One Tree Hill along with the closing track "Beside Me", which appeared on the show's second episode. The band also contributed two tracks for the 2003 video game Hunter: The Reckoning – Wayward.

== Reception ==
Professional ratings
Review scores
Source	Rating
AllMusic	2/5 stars

The album received mixed reviews from critics. Allmusic labeled it a good attempt, but criticized the lack of individuality in the album, stating that "Yates has a powerful voice, and his pals seem to put everything they have into their playing (especially on "Drift"). But with its glossy production, same-y songs, and general interest lyrical ideologies, Forty Foot Echo's debut is designed for maximum consumption by the lowest common denominator." Ink 19 gave the album a much more positive review, concluding that "Overall, Forty Foot Echo is an impressive, thoroughly modern rock album which serves up energetic, infectious rock and mid-paced ballads in equal measure. If success was based purely on talent, then Forty Foot Echo would go far."

== Track listing ==
All lyrics are written by Murray Yeates.

No.	Title	Length
1.	"Drift"	3:07
2.	"Multiply"	3:23
3.	"Save Me"	3:25
4.	"Weakness"	3:23
5.	"Long Way Down"	3:35
6.	"Brand New Day"	3:34
7.	"What If I Don't"	2:42
8.	"Hollow"	3:45
9.	"Born Yesterday"	3:04
10.	"Songbird"	3:31
11.	"Tomorrow"	3:06
12.	"Beside Me"	4:29
Total length:		41:04

== Personnel ==
Forty Foot Echo

- Murray Yates – lead vocals
- Peter Thorn – guitar, backing vocals
- Eric Schraeder – guitar, backing vocals
- Mike Sanchez – bass
- Rob Kurzreiter – drums

Additional musicians

- Danny Frankel – percussion

Production

- Jim Wirt – producer
- P. J. Smith – engineer
- C. J. Eiriksson – Pro Tools engineer
- Tom Lord-Alge – mixing
- Stephen Marcussen – mastering
