= 20 Years =

20 Years or Twenty Years may refer to:

- 20 Years – A Warrior Soul, a video album by Doro Pesch, 2006
- Twenty Years (film), a 1949 Italian comedy
- "Twenty Years" (song), by Placebo, 2004

== See also ==
- 20 Años (disambiguation)
- Bees Saal Baad (disambiguation) (lit. '20 Years Later'), Indian films
