= Ten Years After (disambiguation) =

Ten Years After is an English blues rock band.

Ten Years After may also refer to:

- Ten Years After (Ten Years After album)
- Ten Years After (Tommy Keene album)
- Ten Years After, an album by Theatre of Hate
- 10 Years After, an album by Jerusalem

== See also ==
- 10 Years Later (disambiguation)
