= Bands on the Run =

American reality competition television series

- Genre: Reality competition
- Directed by: Kenny Hull; Craig Borders; Brendon Carter; Mark Perez
- Country of origin: United States
- Original language: English
- No. of seasons: 1
- No. of episodes: 16

Production
- Executive producer: Dan Cutforth
- Running time: 42 minutes
- Production company: Magical Elves

Original release
- Network: VH1
- Release: April 2 – July 15, 2001

Bands on the Run is an American reality competition television series which first aired on VH1 from April 2 to July 15, 2001. The show featured four unsigned bands competing for a prize package which included $50,000 in cash, $100,000 in musical equipment from Guitar Center, a showcase in front of recording executives, and a fully produced music video to be aired on VH1. In the season finale, it was revealed that the band Flickerstick won the competition.

== Bands ==
Band Name	Home	Members	Genre
Flickerstick	Fort Worth	Cory Kreig (guitar/keyboards/vocals), Brandin Lea (vocals/guitar), Fletcher Lea (bass guitar), Rex Ewing (guitar/vocals), and Dominic Weir (drums/percussion).	Indie rock, alternative rock
Harlow	Los Angeles	Amanda Rootes (vocals/guitar), Chimene Gonzalez (bass guitar/vocals), Rayshele Teige (guitar/vocals), and Rebecca Gibb (drums/percussion).	Punk rock, goth rock
Josh Dodes Band	New York City	Josh Dodes (vocals/piano), Jo-Jo Moceri (drums/percussion), Daryl Wilkerson (bass guitar), Maiya Sykes (vocals), and Adrian Hartley (vocals).	Jazz fusion, pop rock
Soulcracker	San Diego	Beastie Ulery (vocals/trumpet), Sutton Althisar (vocals/guitar), A.P. Murray (bass guitar/vocals), Ramsey Fauset (guitar), and Bob Hamel (drums/percussion/vocals).	Alternative rock, powerpop

== Format ==
Each band plays a gig in a selected city. The act that makes the most money from ticket and merchandise sales wins. They set the prices. They promote the shows. All they have to survive on are $20 a day per band member, gas and phone cards, and a hotel room.

— VH1, "Bands on the Run" Website

== Episodes ==
Episode	Location	First Aired
1	San Francisco	2 April 2001
2	Chicago	8 April 2001
3	Chicago	15 April 2001
4	Cleveland	23 April 2001
5	Pittsburgh	30 April 2001
6	Columbus	6 May 2001
7	Columbus	13 May 2001
8	Nashville	20 May 2001
9	Memphis	28 May 2001
10	New Orleans	3 June 2001
11	Atlanta	10 June 2001
12	Atlanta	17 June 2001
13	Tampa	25 June 2001
14	Miami	1 July 2001
15	Miami	8 July 2001
16	Reunion Show	17 July 2001

== Production ==
The series was produced by Dan Cutforth and Jane Lipsitz, who formed the production company Magical Elves during its making and went on to produce Project Runway and Top Chef.
