= Time to Break the Spell =

Studio album by The Veer Union
- Released: 2006
- Recorded: 2004–2005
- Genre: Hard rock, post-grunge
- Length: 39:17
- Label: Independent, Adaptation Records (reissue)
- Producer: Self-produced

The Veer Union chronology
| ''Time to Break the Spell'' (2006) | Against the Grain (2009) |

Time to Break the Spell is the debut album from Canadian rock band The Veer Union. The album was first self-released by the band, in 2006, when the band was still under their original name, "Veer". The album was reissued under their current name, The Veer Union, on August 9, 2011.

== Background and recording ==
Work on the album started shortly after the band was founded in 2004 by vocalist Crispin Earl and guitarist Eric Schraeder. Earl had been fronting the band "Everything After", and working on Tommy Lee's album solo album Tommyland: The Ride, while Schraeder had been playing with the band Forty Foot Echo; however, neither was happy, and decided to instead form their own band with each other.

The two wrote and created the album mostly by themselves, with them meeting future bassist and second guitarist Mark Roots and James Fiddler, respectively, after the sessions were over. Upon seeing them around the studio, they were befriended, and later asked to join the band, and tour in support of the album.

The album was initially self-produced and self released in 2006. The initial run was limited to 1,000 copies. After the band would receive major record label attention with their release of Against the Grain in 2009, the band would later re-issue the album in August 2011. A newly recorded 2011 track, "I Will Remain", was added to the album.

== Track listing ==
| No. | Title | Length |
|---|---|---|
| 1. | "I Will Remain" | 2:54 |
| 2. | "Don't Take It Out on Me" | 2:55 |
| 3. | "Wish You Well" | 3:39 |
| 4. | "Over Me" | 3:28 |
| 5. | "Falling Apart" | 3:59 |
| 6. | "Breathing In" | 4:03 |
| 7. | "Another World Away" | 3:46 |
| 8. | "See Right Through You" | 3:10 |
| 9. | "I'm Sorry" | 3:45 |
| 10. | "Hide the Truth" | 3:39 |
| 11. | "Sold Me Out" | 3:22 |
| Total length: | | 38:40 |

=== Song details ===
With the album receiving such a limited initial release, many of the tracks would later appear on other releases by the band. The three tracks "Over Me", "Breathing In", and "I'm Sorry" would be later be re-recorded and re-released on the band's 2009 major record label debut Against the Grain, while "Don't Take it Out on Me" was rewritten into "Youth of Yesterday". The tracks "Wish You Well", Falling Apart", "Another World Away", and "Hide The Truth" were all later released on The Veer Union EP in 2009. The track "I Will Remain" was recorded for the 2011 reissue of the album, and was later released again in 2012 on their third album, Divide the Blackened Sky as well.

The only tracks not released on any other albums would be "See Right Through You" and "Sold Me Out".

== Reception ==
The album has received generally positive reception. Melodic praised the album for being "great melodic hard rock...with a modern touch to their riffs and radio ready choruses."
