= Siempre Así =

Spanish pop band

Siempre Así is a Spanish pop group founded in Seville in 1991. The eight members of the group, including four singers, are Paola Prieto, Sandra Barón, Mati Carnerero, Rocío García Muñiz, Maite Parejo, Nacho Sabater, Ángel Rivas, and Rafa Almarcha.

== Discography ==
- Siempre así, 1992
- Mahareta, 1994
- Cantando que es gerundio, 1997
- Diez y cuarto, 1998
- Todo vale, 2000
- Diez años juntos, 2001
- Nuevas canciones para padres novatos, 2000
- Km 8, 2004
- Vamo a escuchá grandes éxitos, 2006
- La misa de la alegría, 2006
- El amor es otra cosa, 2009
- El sentido de la navidad, 2011
- 20 Años 2012
- Corazón 2015
