= Against the Grain (The Veer Union album) =

Studio album by The Veer Union
- Released: April 21, 2009
- Recorded: 2009
- Genre: Hard rock, post-grunge
- Length: 41:56
- Label: Universal Motown Records

The Veer Union chronology
| Time to Break the Spell (2006) | ''Against the Grain'' (2009) | Divide the Blackened Sky (2012) |

Singles from Against the Grain
- 1. "Seasons" Released: February 23, 2009; 2. "Youth of Yesterday" Released: August 6, 2009; 3. "Darker Side of Me" Released: March 9, 2010

Professional ratings
Review scores
| Source | Rating |
|---|---|
| Allmusic | 2.5/5 stars |
| Artist Direct | 3/5 stars |
| Rock on Request | favorable |
| Tunelab.com | 8.5/10 stars |

Against the Grain is the second album from The Veer Union (and their first under their current name, since they had released their debut album under the name "Veer").

== Background and release ==
The album was released by Universal Motown on April 21, 2009. Three singles were released from the album, "Seasons", "Youth of Yesterday", and "Darker Side of Me". Vocalist Crispin Earl, described the meaning behind "Seasons" as: "a metaphor for starting over no matter what the circumstance. We all go through rough times in life, but we are still here, and as long as we live, we must enjoy life and carry on and learn from everything we experience".

The Pittsburgh Penguins used "Seasons" as an unofficial theme song on their road to the 2009 Stanley Cup title. The Penguins' general manager had heard the song on the radio and fell in love with it. WWE used the song for the 2009 Backlash event. The song became downloadable content for the Rock Band music video game series on August 24, 2010, as part of the "Universal Motown Republic Rock" Pack.

== Track listing ==
All songs written by Crispin Earl and Eric Schraeder, except where noted.

1. "Seasons" – 3:47
2. "Youth of Yesterday" (Crispin Earl, Brian Howes, and Eric Schraeder) – 2:54
3. "Over Me" – 3:15
4. "Darker Side of Me" – 2:45
5. "I'm Sorry" (Earl, Howes, and Schraeder) – 3:51
6. "Final Moment" – 3:32
7. "Better Believe It" – 3:17
8. "Into Your Garden" – 3:12
9. "Your Love Kills Me" (Earl, Howes, and Schraeder) – 3:11
10. "Breathing In" – 4:00
11. "Where I Want to Be" – 2:40
12. "What Have We Done" (Greg Archilla, Earl, and Schraeder) – 5:32

== Charts ==
"Seasons"
| Chart (2009) | Peak position |
|---|---|
| U.S. Billboard Mainstream Rock Tracks | 10 |
| U.S. Billboard Alternative Songs | 30 |
| U.S. Billboard Rock Songs | 16 |
