= 10 Years Later =

10 Years Later or Ten Years Later may refer to:

- "10 Years Later" (song), by Collective Soul
- 10 Years Later (TV series), a Georgian TV series
- The Vicomte of Bragelonne: Ten Years Later, a novel by Alexandre Dumas
- Ten Years Later, Alvin Lee's backing band

== See also ==
- Ten Years After (disambiguation)
- Bees Saal Baad (disambiguation) (lit. '20 Years Later'), Indian films
