= 10 Años =

10 Años (Spanish "diez años") or 10 Anos (Portuguese "dez anos") may refer to:

== Music ==
- 10 Años, album by Antonio Flores
- 10 Años, album by Los Caminantes (1999)
- 10 Años, album by Grupo Gale (1999)
- 10 Años, album by Myriam Montemayor Cruz (2012)
- 10 Años, album by Neyma (2011)
- 10 Años, album by Ojos de Brujo (2010)
- 10 Anos, album by Xuxa (1996)
- 10 Anos Depois, album by Jorge Ben
- 10 Años: Un Panteón Muy Vivo, album by Panteón Rococó (2006)
