= Tarantula (Flickerstick album) =

Studio album by Flickerstick
- Released: (United States) October 12, 2004
- Recorded: Playground, Chicago, IL
- Genre: Indie rock
- Length: 55:10
- Label: Idol Records
- Producer: Brandin Lea, Cory Kreig, Keith Cleversley

Flickerstick chronology
To Madagascar and Back (2003)	Tarantula (2004)	Live from Atlanta: Two Nights at Sound Tree Studios (2007)

Tarantula is the second studio album released on October 12, 2004, by Flickerstick via Idol Records.

== Track listing ==
All songs written by Brandin Lea and Cory Kreig.

1. "Catholic Scars and Chocolate Bars" (4:34)
2. "When You Were Young" (4:15)
3. "Teenage Dope Fiend" (2:49) (released as a single)
4. "Bleeding" (7:33)
5. "Never Enough" (4:38)
6. "The Tourist" (3:51)
7. "Money & Dealers" (3:33)
8. "Girls & Pills" (3:03)
9. "All We Are Is Gone" (6:29)
10. "Rain" (2:47)
11. "Pistol in My Hand" (6:51)
12. "The Ones" (5:12)
