= Los Morros del Norte =

Mexican band

- Origin: Tamazula Durango
- Genres: Norteño
- Years active: 1993–present
- Members: Fermin Beltran; Javier Beltran; Tomas Beltran; Samuel Ayon

Los Morros del Norte are a Mexican Norteño band. The band was founded by brothers Fermin, Javier, and Tomas Beltran, and their cousin Samuel Ayon, all originally from Tamazula Durango. They made their professional recording debut in 1993.

== Discography ==
- La Cadena
- 20 Años
