= Plain Jane Automobile =

American indie rock band

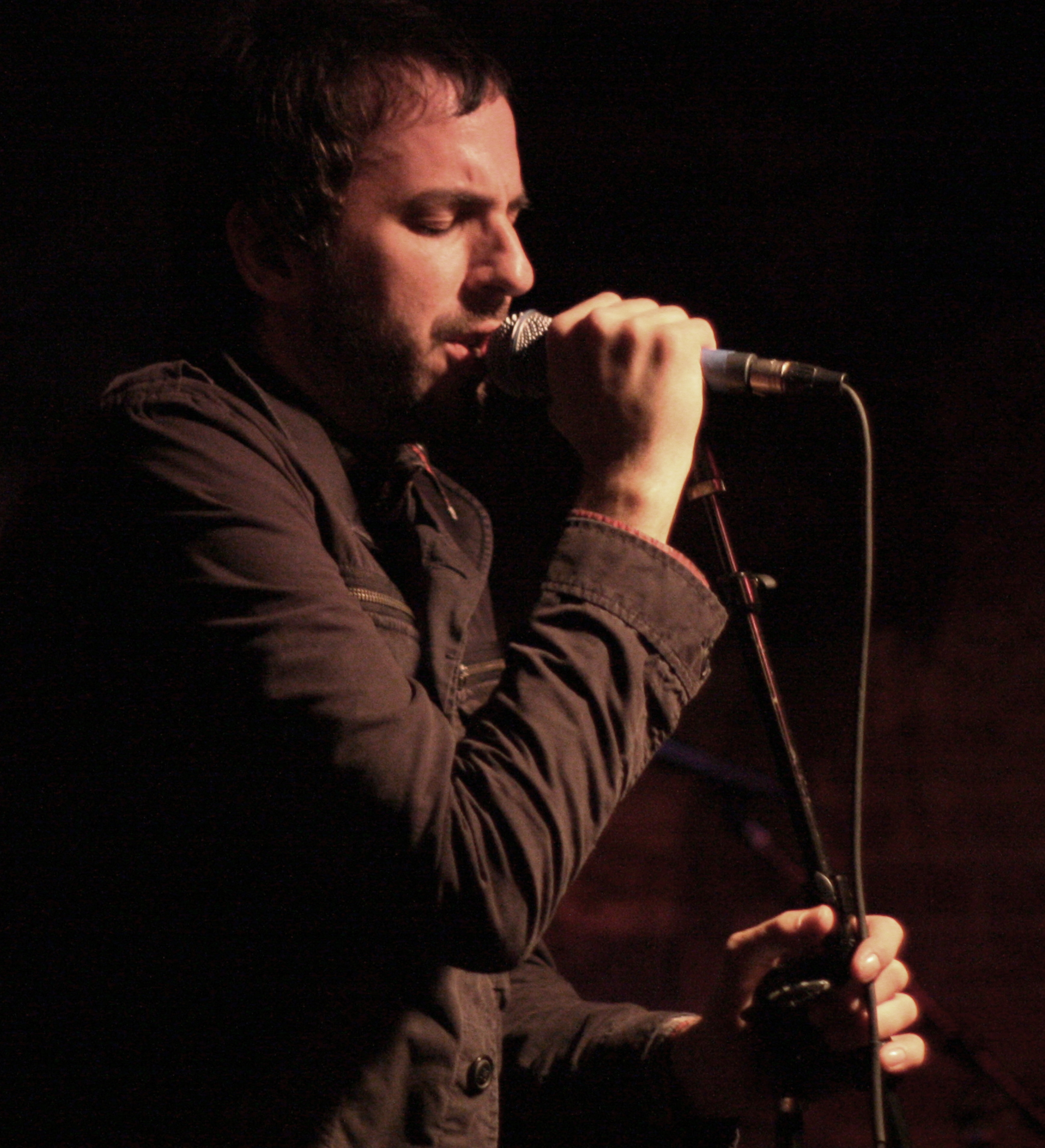
- PJA performing in 2010.

Background information
- Origin: Orlando, Florida, U.S.
- Genres: Indie rock
- Years active: 2001 – present
- Label: Indie
- Members: James "Duke" Crider; Luis Mejia; Paul McCorkell; James Dickens
- Website: Official Website

Plain Jane Automobile (often referred to PJA) is an American indie rock band based in Orlando, Florida, United States. They have existed as a band for the past seven or eight years, but reinvented themselves in 2005 with key new members, and have not changed the line-up since. The band's current line-up consists of James "Duke" Crider (vocals), Luis Mejia (guitar), Paul McCorkell (bass), and James Dickens (drums).

== Summary ==
Plain Jane Automobile began as a collaboration between Duke Crider and Luis Mejia. The pair's ability to write songs and drive their live shows led to their meeting Paul McCorkell and James Dickens.

In 2008, Plain Jane Automobile released The Collector. They also toured extensively throughout the United States with fellow indie rock band Ours, with guitar, vocal and keyboard tour support by Matt Vetter winning many new fans. In 2009, they planned another tour, as well as working on songs for a new album.

With the chemistry of the line-up solidified, everything fell into place. In 2005, the indie pop quartet won the 2005 DiscMakers Independent Showcase, hand-picked as the best of a series of bands by major A&R reps at Billboard magazine and TAXI (A&R).

In 2010, the band was working on the follow-up to The Collector. In March 2011, a series of promo videos for the new album, Your Tomorrow, were posted on Plain Jane Automobile's Facebook page. The first video was a 50 second clip of an unknown track on the new album, as well as the release date for the next album. The second video included a one-minute clip of "Please Leave Quietly", a song from the new album. A third video was posted recently that was similar in nature to the first two videos. Your Tomorrow was released on May 9, 2011.

== Discography ==
=== Albums ===
- The Collector (2008, Rymo Records)
- Your Tomorrow (2011)

=== EPs ===
- Plain Jane Automobile (2006, Eighth Dimension)
