= A.I. Insight forums =

Series of forums on artificial intelligence

The Artificial Intelligence Insight forums, also known as the A.I. Insight forums, are a series of forums to build consensus on how the United States Congress should craft A.I. legislation. Organized by Senate Majority Leader Charles "Chuck" Schumer, the first of nine closed-door forums convened on September 13, 2023.

== Background ==
Amid a surge in the popularity and advancement of artificial intelligence, senator Chuck Schumer launched an effort to establish a framework for the regulation of A.I. in April 2023. By the end of June, a preliminary framework – dubbed the "SAFE Innovation Framework" – was established and presented to Congress.

Schumer also announced a series of forums wherein tech leaders who were well-acquainted with A.I. would help to "educate" Congress on the risks and problems that A.I. poses. Many tech leaders including Sam Altman, Elon Musk, and Sundar Pichai were set to attend the meetings. Many U.S. lawmakers and senators such as Mike Rounds and Todd Young were also set to attend.

== September 13 forum ==
The overarching consensus following the conclusion of the September 13 forum was that there "should be" regulations regarding the use and advancement of A.I., but it should not be made "too fast". Many tech executives who attended the forum also warned senators of the risks and threats that A.I. could pose. Musk, who attended the forum, stated afterwards that there was "overwhelming consensus" on the regulation of A.I.

=== Invitees ===
This is a list of people who were invited to attend the September 13 forum.

- Elon Musk (Tesla, SpaceX, X Corp.)
- Sam Altman (OpenAI)
- Bill Gates (ex–Microsoft)
- Jensen Huang (Nvidia)
- Alex Karp (Palantir)
- Satya Nadella (Microsoft)
- Arvind Krishna (IBM)
- Sundar Pichai (Alphabet Inc., Google)
- Eric Schmidt (ex–Google)
- Mark Zuckerberg (Meta)
- Charles Rivkin (Motion Picture Association)
- Liz Shuler (AFL-CIO)
- Meredith Stiehm (Writers Guild of America)
- Randi Weingarten (American Federation of Teachers)
- Maya Wiley (LCCHR)

== October 24 forum ==
The second of nine forums was hosted on October 24, 2023, as federal A.I. regulation drew nearer. According to Schumer's office, the forum was centered mainly on how A.I. could "enable innovation", and the innovation that is needed for the safe progression of A.I. At the forum, Senators Brian Schatz and John Kennedy introduced the "Schatz-Kennedy A.I. Labeling Act", a new piece of A.I. legislation that would provide "more transparency on A.I.-generated content".

Following the forum, Senator Rounds stated that in order to fuel the development of A.I., a total estimated $56 billion would be needed for the next three years. Rounds, alongside Senator Young and Schumer, also highlighted the need to outcompete China and workforce initiatives.

=== Invitees ===
21 people were invited to attend the forum, and were composed largely of venture capitalists, academics, civil rights campaigners, and industry figures. Some key figures included venture capitalists Marc Andreessen and John Doerr.

== Future ==
Over the course of fall 2023, there is slated to be a total of nine forums on the topic of A.I., with the first hosted on September 13.
