= The Veer Union =

Canadian rock band

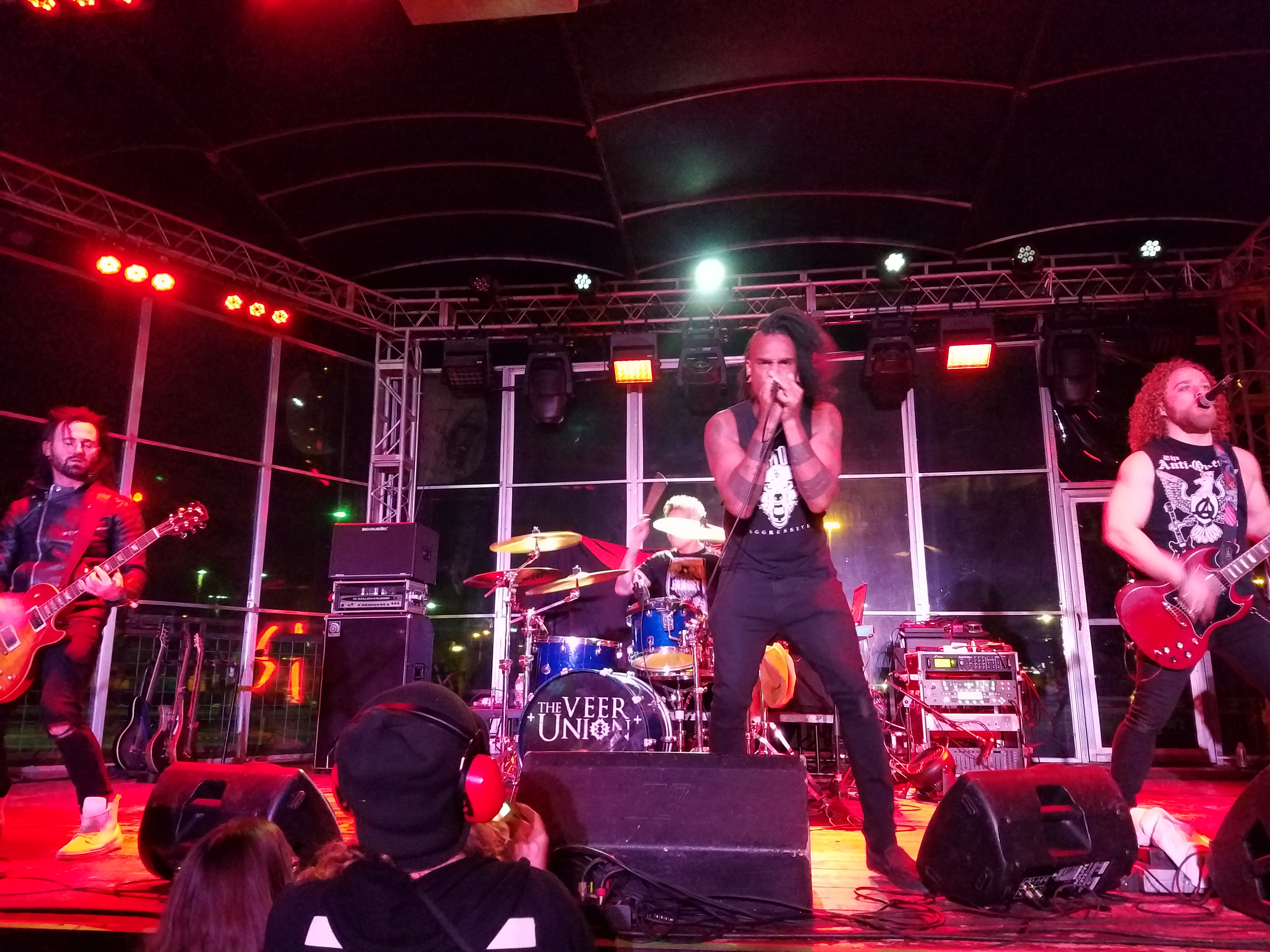
- The Veer Union performing in 2018

Background information
- Origin: Vancouver, British Columbia, Canada
- Genres: Alternative metal; hard rock; post-grunge; alternative rock
- Years active: 2004–present
- Labels: Rock Shop; Pavement; Universal Motown; Arising Empire
- Members: Crispin Earl; Ryan Ramsdell; Ricardo Viana; Glen Clarke
- Past members: James Fiddler; Marc Roots; Neil Beaton; Eric Schraeder; Tyler Reimer; Amal Wijayanayake; Dan Sittler
- Website: theveerunion.net

The Veer Union is a Canadian post-grunge band from Vancouver, British Columbia. They have released multiple studio albums, Time to Break the Spell (2006), Against the Grain (2009), Divide the Blackened Sky (2012), and an EP Life Support Part 1 (2013). Their fourth studio album, Decade, was released on January 29, 2016. The fifth and sixth, Decade II:Rock & Acoustic and Decade III:Demos & Rarities were released on August 31, 2018. Their seventh album Quarantine Collaborations was released on December 17, 2021, and on December 16, 2022, their eighth album release Manifestations. Their new album, with newest member, Glen Clarke, on bass guitar and scream vocals, called Reinvention will be released on their new record label, Arising Empire Records, on February 20, 2026. Their new single and video, My Empire, is available now at their website and YouTube channel.

== History ==
=== Time to Break the Spell as "Veer" (2004–2007) ===
The band was formed in 2004 by founders Crispin Earl, and Eric Schraeder, under the original name of "Veer". The band released one independent album, Time to Break the Spell, in 2006. After the album's release, and touring with bands like Hinder, Theory of a Deadman, Seether, and Black Stone Cherry, the band was able to attract major label interest, and signed a record deal with Universal Motown Records. Once signing to the label, the band decided to change their name to "The Veer Union". The band explained that it wasn't legal problems, but rather getting away from negative situations and coming together in a more positive one.

"It was more of a band decision. Before TVU we were all in other bands and not digging the situations we were in. So we "veered" away from the negativity and came together as a "Union". Originally it was Veer, when we got signed, we added the Union."

After the band received major record label attention, the album was re-issued in August 2011.

=== Against the Grain (2008–2010) ===
Before releasing their debut album, they recorded and released a self-titled EP containing alternate versions of songs on their debut, and unreleased songs as well. The band released their debut album, Against the Grain, on April 21, 2009. Against the Grain has reached number 32 on Billboard's Top Heatseekers, and its first single, Seasons, has reached number 10 on Billboard's Hot Mainstream Rock Tracks chart, number 16 on the Rock Songs chart and number 30 on the Alternative Songs chart. "Seasons" was also the official theme song for WWE Backlash 2009, Pittsburgh Penguins.

From July to September, the band supported Sick Puppies and Hurt in a tour throughout the U.S., and then later toured with Cavo and Framing Hanley.

Despite the band's success with the album, the single "Seasons", and reports of the band getting along very well with their record label, the band was dropped from the label after touring in support of the album ended.

=== Divide the Blackened Sky (2011–2012) ===
Despite being dropped by Universal Records, the band decided to continue on without major record label support. In 2011, the band announced the title of their second album would be Divide the Blackened Sky, and would be released on smaller label Rocket Science Ventures/Red Distribution. In 2011, they held a contest to have fans submit artwork to be picked to be on the album's front cover. Divide the Blackened Sky was released on March 26, 2012, and the first single was "Bitter End". Frontman Crispin Earl said of the album, ""Our new record, Divide The Blackened Sky, is a much darker and heavier effort than our previous works. It depicts all the hard times we have been through over the last couple of years."

On February 22, 2012, it was announced that bassist Marc Roots and guitarist James Fiddler left the band. The band chose to use their previous bass tech, Winston Wolfe, as a touring replacement on bass, and decided to not find a replacement for Fiddler as the second guitarist, opting to continue as a four-piece band. In April 2012, the band toured with My Darkest Days and Cavo. In July 2012, the band announced intentions on releasing a fourth studio album, for release some time in 2013.

=== Life Support Part 1 and Decade (2013–2020) ===
In early 2013, the band started a Kickstarter to help raise money towards working on future music. The band met the goal, and then began working on material in Edmonton, Alberta, for an upcoming release, titled Life Support Part 1, which was released on December 10, 2013.

In December 2015, the band announced that they would be releasing a fourth album, consisting of Earl and an all new lineup, entitled Decade, on January 29, 2016. The First single, "Defying Gravity", was released in the same month. The release coincides with the tenth anniversary of their first album, Time to Break the Spell, and consists of five reworked unreleased tracks that were written prior to the first album, and five tracks that are completely new. In addition to Earl, new members include Ryan Ramsdell on rhythm guitar, Dan Sittler on lead guitar, Tyler Reimer on drums, and Amal Wijayanayake on bass guitar and screamed vocals.

In early 2016, the ensemble travelled the southern, southeastern and Midwestern United States along with Bridge to Grace, Bobaflex, and Artifas.

=== Later years (2020–present) ===
In August 2020, the band release a new single titled "Slaves to the System" with the album planning to come out early spring next year in 2021.

== Musical style & influences ==
The band's musical style is most commonly described as hard rock or post-grunge. They have also been described as alternative rock, alternative metal and melodic metal. The band used to employ a style of dual harmonized vocals, typically between vocalist Crispin Earl and Eric Schraeder in a similar style to the band Alice in Chains, until Schraeder left in 2013, leaving vocals to only Crispin Earl. Earl has mentioned other influences for the band as Led Zeppelin, Soundgarden and Rush.

== Band members ==
Current members

- Crispin Earl - lead vocals (2004–present)
- Ryan Ramsdell - rhythm guitar (2012–present)
- Ricardo Viana - drums (2017–present)
- Glen Clarke - unclean vocals, bass guitar (2025–present)

Former members

- James Fiddler - guitar, backing vocals (2004–11)
- Eric Schraeder - guitar, backing vocals (2004–13)
- Marc Roots - bass guitar (2004–11)
- Neil Beaton - drums (2004–13)
- Tyler Reimer - drums (2015–17)
- Amal Wijayanayake - bass guitar, backing vocals (2013–17)
- Dan Sittler - lead guitar, backing vocals (2014–20)

Touring members

- Winston Wolfe - bass (2012)

Timeline

== Discography ==
=== Studio albums ===
Year	Album details	Peak chart positions	
Year	Album details	US	US Heat
2006	Time to Break the Spell: Released: 2006; Label: Independent, Adaptation Records (reissue)	—	—
2009	Against the Grain: Released: April 21, 2009; Label: Universal Motown	—	32
2012	Divide the Blackened Sky: Released: March 26, 2012; Label: Rocket Science/RED	—	33
2016	Decade: Released: January 29, 2016; Label: Pavement Entertainment	—	23
2018	Decade II: Rock & Acoustic: Released: August 31, 2018; Label: Rock Shop Records	—	—
2018	Decade III: Demos & Rarities: Released: August 31, 2018; Label: Rock Shop Records	—	—
2019	Covers Collection, Vol. 1: Released: December 20, 2019; Label: Rock Shop Records	—	—
2021	Quarantine Collaborations: Released: December 17, 2021; Label: Rock Shop Records	—	—
2022	Manifestations: Released: December 16, 2022; Label: Rock Shop Records	—	—
2023	Crispin Acoustic Covers Vol. 1: Released: August 18, 2023; Label: Rock Shop Records	—	—
2023	Covers Collection Vol. 2: Released: September 29, 2023; Label: Rock Shop Records	—	—
2024	Life Support 1 & 2 (2013-2023): Released: May 3, 2024; Label: Rock Shop Records	—	—
2024	Welcome to Dystopia: Released: December 27, 2024; Label: Rock Shop Records	—	—
2026	Reinvention: Released: February 20, 2026; Label: Arising Empire Records	—	—
"—" denotes a release that did not chart

=== Compilation albums ===
- Decade: History of Our Evolution (31 August 2018)

=== EPs ===
Year	EP details
2009	The Veer Union EP: Released: 2009; Label: Universal Motown
2012	Demos & Bsides: Released: March 26, 2012; Label: Rocket Science, RED
2013	Life Support Vol. 1 - EP: Released: December 10, 2013; Label: Minus 4 Records
2015	Life Support Vol. 1: Acoustic Sessions - EP: Released: March 15, 2015; Label: Rock Shop Records
2016	Decade (Acoustic Sessions): Released: November 4, 2016; Label: Rock Shop Records
2024	Breathe Into Me (Acoustic): Released: May 3, 2024; Label: Rock Shop Records

=== Singles ===
Year	Song	Peak chart positions			Album
Year	Song	US Alt	US Main	US Rock	Album
2009	"Seasons"	30	10	16	Against the Grain
2009	"Youth of Yesterday"	—	23	49	Against the Grain
2010	"Darker Side of Me"	—	26	—	Against the Grain
2012	"Bitter End"	—	—	19	Divide the Blackened Sky
2013	"Brave the Impossible"	—	—	—	Life Support: Volume 1
2014	"Borderline"	—	—	—	Divide the Blackened Sky
2016	"Defying Gravity"	—	—	28	Decade
2020	"Slaves to the System"	—	—	—	
2025	"My Empire"	×	×	×	Reinvention
2025	"Sea of Fears"	×	×	×	Reinvention
2025	"Caught In the Crossfire"	×	×	×	Reinvention
2025	"Sunk Your Teeth In"	×	×	×	Reinvention
