= Slug (song) =

1995 song by Passengers

Song by Passengers

from the album Original Soundtracks 1
- Released: 7 November 1995
- Recorded: November 1994–July 1995
- Studio: Westside (London); Hanover Quay (Dublin)
- Genre: Ambient; electronica; experimental
- Length: 4:41
- Label: Island
- Songwriters: Brian Eno; Bono; Adam Clayton; The Edge; Larry Mullen Jr.
- Producer: Brian Eno

"Slug" is a song by Passengers, a side project of musician Brian Eno and rock band U2. It is the second track on Passengers' sole release, the 1995 experimental album Original Soundtracks 1. Initially titled "Seibu", the song was nearly omitted from the album until being rediscovered later during the recording sessions. Though Eno made the majority of the creative decisions during the sessions, "Slug" was one of the few tracks on the album that the members of U2 attempted to create independently.

Lyrically, it depicts the thoughts of a desolate soul with the confusion of romance and faith. When Eno and U2 were producing songs for fictional soundtracks, they attempted to create a visual suggestion from the music that was more significant than the story in the lyrics. The instrumentation in "Slug" is intended to be visual music, symbolising city lights turning on at night. The song was primarily inspired by U2's experiences in Tokyo following the completion of their Zoo TV Tour in 1993. Critics from numerous publications regarded "Slug" as one of the best songs on the album, both when it was first released and in retrospective reviews.

== Background and recording ==
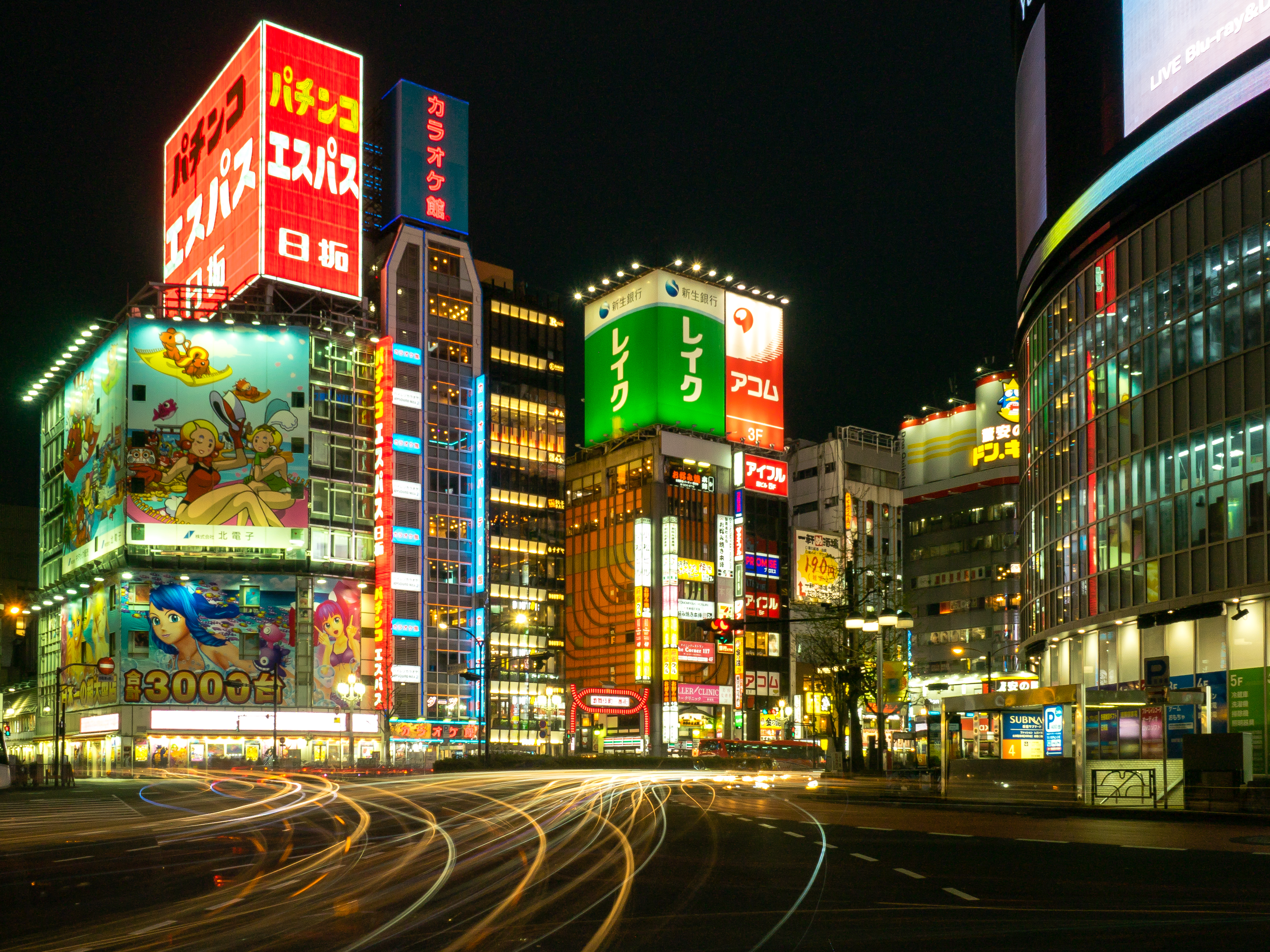
The music from "Slug" was intended to create the visual of lights in a city like Tokyo (pictured), whose setting was an inspiration for the album.

Following the conclusion of their Zoo TV Tour in 1993, rock band U2 planned to collaborate with musician Brian Eno on recording a soundtrack for Peter Greenaway's 1996 film The Pillow Book. Although the plan did not come to fruition, Eno suggested that the band continue recording music suitable for film soundtracks, as Eno did with his 1978 album Music for Films. The result was Original Soundtracks 1, an experimental album of ambient and electronica music, created as a side project between Eno and U2 under the pseudonym "Passengers". Vocalist Bono felt the visual suggestion from the music was more important than the story told by the lyrics, so the band tried to create visual music when recording. U2 spent time in Shinjuku, Tokyo at the end of the Zoo TV Tour in December 1993, and their experience in the city influenced the recording sessions. The vivid colours of the city's street signs and billboards reminded them of the set of the 1982 science fiction film Blade Runner. Bono said that Original Soundtracks 1 evokes the setting of "the bullet train in Tokyo".

Recording sessions for Original Soundtracks 1 began with a two-week session in November 1994 at Westside Studios in London, and continued for another five weeks in mid-1995 at Hanover Quay Studios in Dublin. "Slug" was originally titled "Seibu", after the Japanese department store. It was written to create the visual of lights turning on at dusk in a city like Tokyo, beginning with "tinkling" opening notes resembling twinkling Christmas lights, and a gradually rising and falling synthesiser rhythm throughout the song. After recording "Seibu", the band set it aside, and the piece was forgotten as the sessions progressed. It was almost left off the album, until guitarist the Edge rediscovered the track while looking through the session's discarded songs. Recognising its potential to become a great song, the Edge brought "Seibu" to Eno's attention, and in early June 1995, Eno listed "Seibu" as a late entry to be considered for the album.

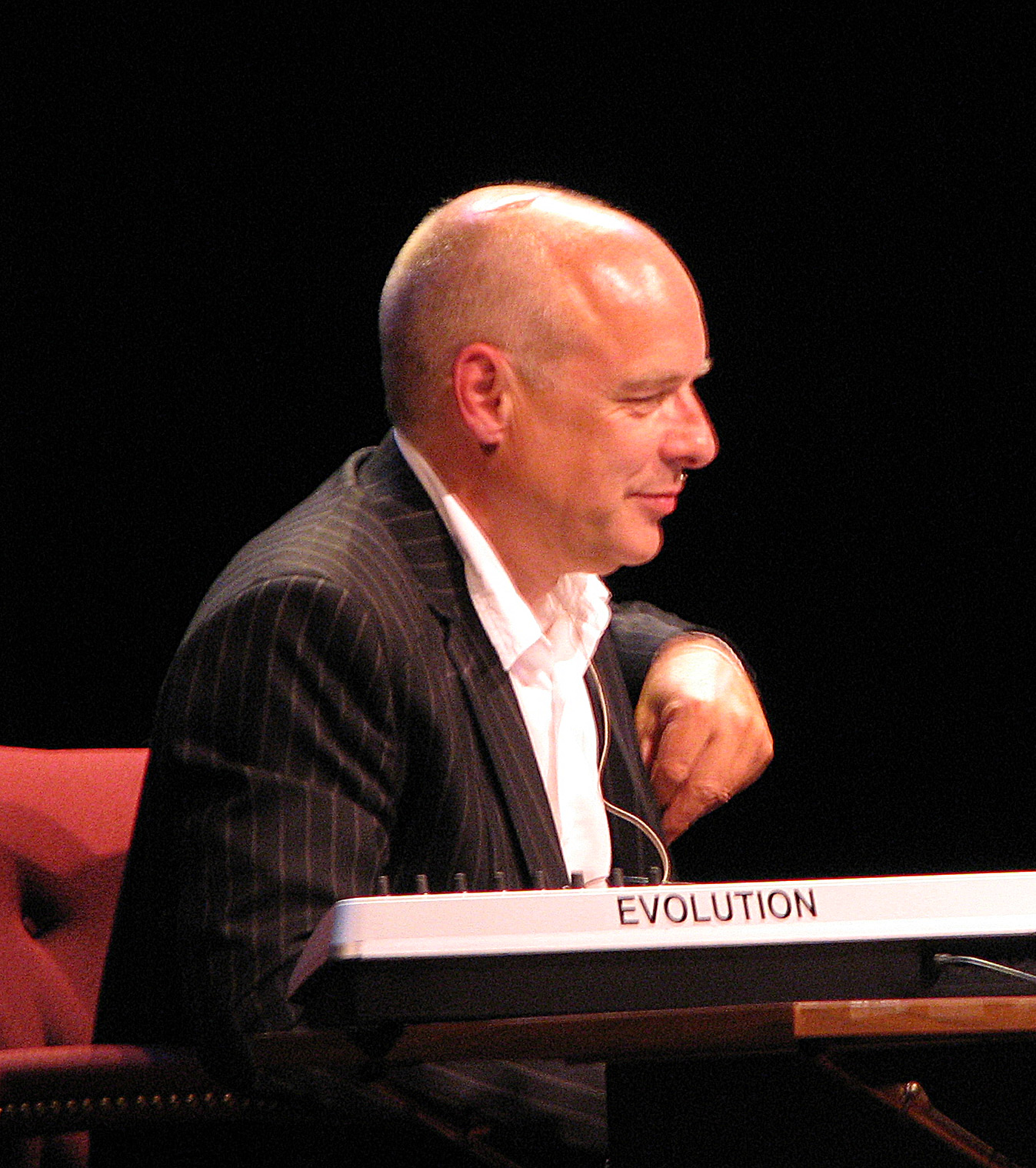
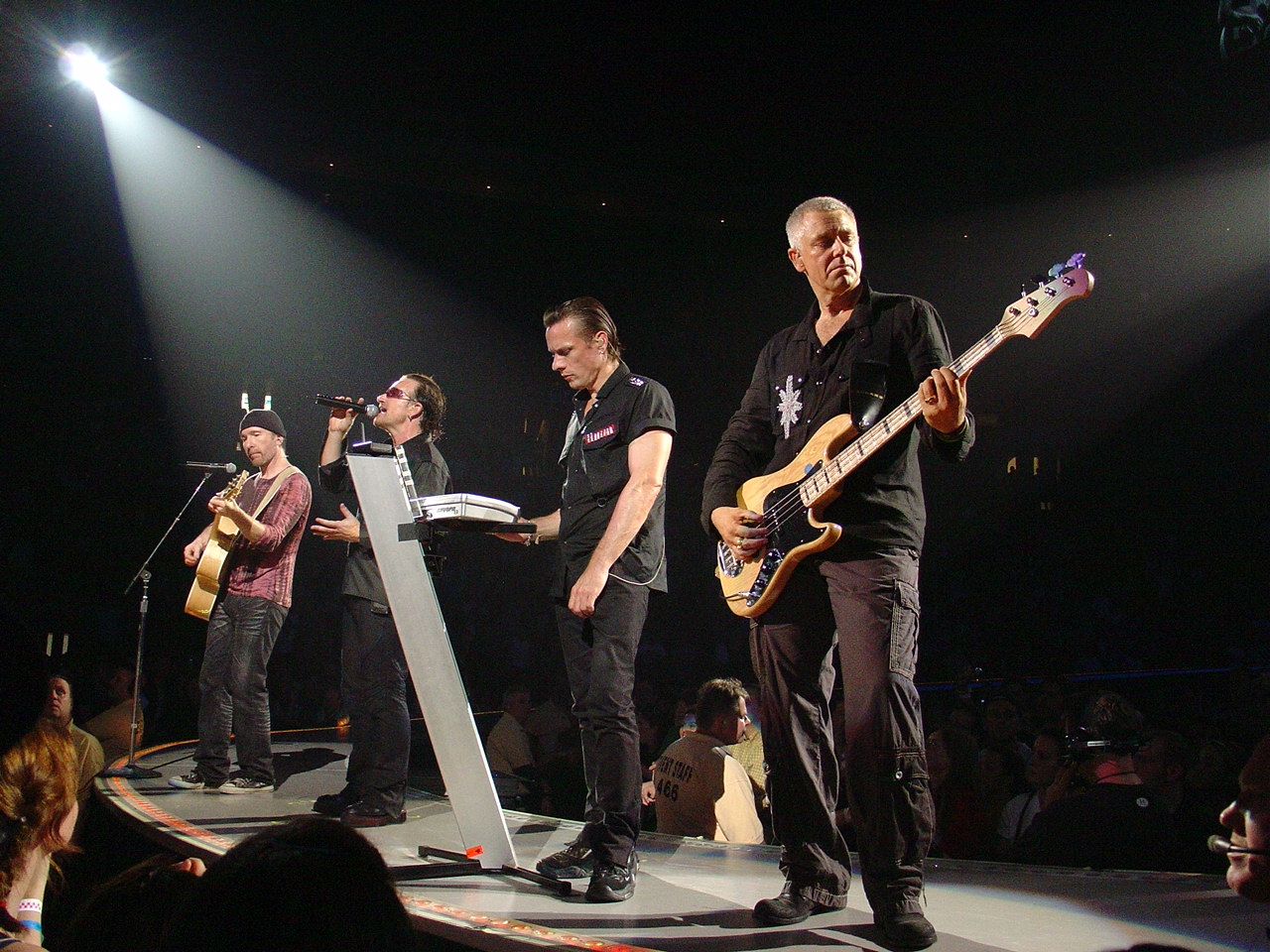
Brian Eno (pictured in 2006) and U2 (pictured in 2005)

As producer, Eno had most of the artistic control during the sessions, limiting U2's creative input on the recordings, which prompted the Edge to ensure extra work was put into arranging the song. He said that along with "Miss Sarajevo" and "Your Blue Room", "Seibu" was one of only three tracks from the album in which U2 "really dug in [their] heels and did more work on and tried to craft". It was mixed and sequenced by Eno, and engineered by Danton Supple, with assistance from Rob Kirwan. By early July 1995, the group renamed the song "Seibu/Slug", and Eno noted that the piece started to sound better, describing it as a "lovely song". Bono later deconstructed the song's original mix; Eno initially disapproved, but was satisfied after hearing the changes. The Edge later said he felt the band's effort to put extra work into the song "paid off". It was released with the title "Slug" on 7 November 1995, as the second track on Passengers' sole album, Original Soundtracks 1; out of the fourteen tracks on the album, it is one of six tracks with vocals.

As the compositions on Original Soundtracks 1 were written as film soundtrack music, each track is associated with a specific film in the album's liner notes, which were written by Eno. Four of the tracks are associated with real films, while "Slug" is credited as having been written for a fictional German film of the same name, directed by "Peter von Heineken" (an in-joke reference to U2 manager Paul McGuinness). The liner notes describe the plot of Slug as the story of a young car mechanic who aspires to attract the attention of a cashier by staging a robbery and pretending to be the hero. However, the "robbers" decide to abandon the scheme and commit an actual robbery, causing a shootout where the cashier accidentally shoots a security guard and is arrested, and the mechanic must find a way to get her released from prison.

== Composition and lyrics ==
"It's a portrait of somebody a little the worse for the wear, which we were all in Tokyo, because it was the end of the tour. So tired you can't sleep. Wanting to go out to see what's going on in the city and not being able to stop yourself though you should be looking after yourself better."

— Bono, on the meaning behind "Slug"

"Slug" runs for 4:41 and features a synthesiser rhythm and guitar harmonics laid over a drum track. Jon Pareles of The New York Times described the song's sound as a mix of "shimmering echoed guitars with swampy electronic rhythms". Vocals are sung by Bono in a crooning voice, which begin 1:45 into the song. The lyrics form a laundry list song with 19 lines, most of which begin with "Don't want"; the song's title is included in the lyrics "Don't want to be a slug". The line "Don't want what I deserve" was written by Bono with a sense of "ironic, self-deprecatory humour". Lyrically, the song portrays the thoughts of a desolate soul, as heard in the final lines "Don't want to be a pain / Don't wanna stay the same". The lyrical themes also include the confusion between romance and faith, a theme which continues on the album's following track, "Your Blue Room".

The lyrics were written in five minutes and are derived from U2's experience in Shinjuku. Bono has compared the lyrics to those in U2's 1991 song "Tryin' to Throw Your Arms Around the World", as both depict the nightlife of a city. Lyrics were also inspired by the presence of the yakuza in Shinjuku, where the group saw gang members with amputated fingers as punishment for their misbehaviour, which Bono described as a "very, very surreal" experience. He said that "Slug" was about avoiding harmful mistakes, stating "we all play with things we shouldn't play with".

== Reception ==
"Slug"
The song's visuals of city lights were created through an electronic rhythm with synthesisers, guitars, and drums. The crooning vocals sung by Bono was praised by critics.

"Slug" received positive feedback from critics and was praised as one of the best tracks from the album. Shortly following its release, Tony Fletcher wrote in Newsweek that it is one of the album's "instantly rewarding songs" and that Bono's vocals show "genuine tenderness". The Orange County Register listed "Slug" as one of the best songs on the album, describing it as a "dreamy" track, and The Age and The Dominion both stated that the song features Bono providing his best vocals. Jim DeRogatis of Rolling Stone described "Slug" as one of the album's most engaging tracks, commenting that it could have been an outtake from U2's 1993 album Zooropa because of Bono's "minimal crooning over skeletal backing tracks".

In retrospective reviews, Pitchfork wrote that "Slug" is the high point of the album, featuring a "beautiful, slow-motion groove", and Slate praised the experimental nature of the song, calling it "lovely and melodic". Uncut reviewer Alastair McKay described the melody as "clockwork" while noting that Eno's "yen for melodic simplicity" was evident. In an otherwise critical review of Original Soundtracks 1, Irvin Tan of Sputnikmusic commented that "Slug" is one of several "strangely beautiful numbers" from the album, and that its "attempt at creating an overarching time/place set actually comes off quite well". Hot Press editor Niall Stokes said "the song has a genuinely reflective quality and it underlines the fact that, some 15 years on since the release of their debut album Boy, U2 are still running." The song was featured on Stereogum's list of "The 31 Best U2 Non-Album Tracks", which claims the song is unlike any other track that U2 has recorded, describing it as a "hauntingly beautiful entry in U2's canon".

== Personnel ==
Passengers

- Brian Eno – synthesisers
- Bono – vocals
- Adam Clayton – bass guitar
- The Edge – guitar
- Larry Mullen Jr. – drums, percussion

Technical

- Brian Eno – mixing, sequencing
- Danton Supple – audio engineering
- Rob Kirwan – audio engineering (assistance)
