= Your Blue Room =

1995 song by U2 and Brian Eno

- Promo cover

Song by Passengers

from the album Original Soundtracks 1
- Released: 6 November 1995
- Recorded: 1995
- Studio: Westside (London), Hanover Quay (Dublin)
- Genre: Alternative rock, electronica, ambient
- Length: 5:28
- Label: Island Records
- Songwriters: Brian Eno; Bono; Adam Clayton; the Edge; Larry Mullen Jr.
- Producers: U2; Brian Eno

"Your Blue Room" is a song by Passengers, a group composed of rock band U2 and producer Brian Eno. It is the third track on the group's only release, the 1995 album Original Soundtracks 1. The track was written for the 1995 Michelangelo Antonioni–Wim Wenders film Beyond the Clouds. Though Eno made the majority of creative decisions during the recording sessions, "Your Blue Room" was one of the few tracks that the members from U2 tried to craft themselves.

== Background ==
U2 and producer Brian Eno formed Passengers as a side-project during the preliminary recording sessions for U2's 1997 album, Pop. Their intention was to record a soundtrack for Peter Greenaway's 1996 film The Pillow Book as a warm up before the main Pop sessions. Though the plan did not come to fruition, Eno suggested they continue recording for imaginary films. U2 were unsure of the idea at first, but agreed after Eno told them that producing radio hits was not the goal of the collaboration.

U2 had frequently improvised in the past, and in the Original Soundtracks 1 sessions they engaged in free-form jamming to video clips from various films. Eno stated, "Listening to the original improvisations as they came off the floor, you feel the excitement of the process ... You have to be careful not to disturb the organic flow of the thing." The group brought in producer Howie B to cut down and mix some of the tracks after several hours of jam sessions had been recorded.

Part of the group's intent in creating Original Soundtracks 1 had been to make a "night-time" record. Lead vocalist Bono said, "It feels like it's been set on the bullet train in Tokyo. Every record has a location, a place where you enjoy listening to it, whether that be a bedroom or a club, well this record location is a fast train. It's slo-mo music though. But it has an odd sense of speed in the background." He also noted that when creating works for soundtracks the visual suggestion from the music is more important than the story told by the lyrics. With this in mind the band had tried to create "visual music" when recording, continuing a trend that began with their 1993 song "Zooropa".

== Writing and recording ==
The song was written for the Michelangelo Antonioni–Wim Wenders film Beyond the Clouds. Bono describes the song as "based on the idea that sex is a conversation of sorts" but that on another level it is a prayer. He concludes by saying, "It's an incredible thing to say to your lover or your maker: 'Your instructions, whatever the direction.'"

The track features U2's bass player Adam Clayton reciting the final verse, and is the only album recording featuring Clayton as vocalist. (Clayton's only other vocal performance was in 1983 on "Endless Deep," which was released as a B-side to the "Sunday Bloody Sunday" and "Two Hearts Beat as One" singles.) The Edge stated that, while Eno made the majority of creative decisions during the recording sessions, "the only tracks we really dug in our heels and did more work on and tried to craft were 'Miss Sarajevo', 'Seibu', and 'Your Blue Room'."

== Release ==
"Your Blue Room" was slated as the second single release for the album following "Miss Sarajevo", but it was cancelled due to poor album sales. In addition to the Passengers album, "Your Blue Room" was later featured as a B-side on the "Staring at the Sun" single in 1997, and on the B-sides disc of The Best of 1990–2000 in 2002.

== Reception ==
Jon Pareles of The New York Times called Original Soundtracks 1 "a collection of sketched songs and free-form instrumentals" in which "Bono stays quiet and smoky-voiced". Pareles went on to say that "Your Blue Room" "harks back to the Velvet Underground's "Pale Blue Eyes"". Jim Faber of New York's Daily News was less receptive to the album saying, "It can't speak well of an album when the artists involved won't even put their real names on it." In regards to "Your Blue Room" Faber said it "sounds like one of Lou Reed's blander ballads from the '70s". In a 2005 Rolling Stone magazine article, Bono nominated it as one of his favourite U2 songs. Recounting U2's determination to try to craft "Your Blue Room" against Eno's inclination, The Edge said "I think it paid off."

In a 2010 survey conducted by fan site @U2.com, 1513 of 4814 participants (31.43%) labelled "Your Blue Room" their favourite song on the album, ranking it the second most favoured song and the second choice overall behind "Miss Sarajevo" (37.99%), and before no preference (18.53%). Previous fan surveys in 2005, 2006, and 2007 had all also ranked the song the second favourite on the album.

== Live performances ==
"Your Blue Room" made its live debut on 13 September 2009 at Soldier Field in Chicago, during the U2 360° Tour. It was subsequently played on some of the North American second leg shows of the tour, and featured pre-recorded vocals from Sinéad O'Connor and a pre-recorded video of astronaut Frank De Winne reciting the song's final verse from the International Space Station. In writing about the live performance in Toronto on 16 September 2009 Mike Doherty of the National Post said, "When you can play music with someone who’s in space, the idea goes, you’re shrinking our corner of the universe down to size." The Richmond Times-Dispatch was less receptive of the song's performance in Charlottesville, Virginia, stating how the song ruined the show's mood and was "a plodding rumination that consumed precious set list space".

== Track listing ==
Promotional release
No.	Title	Length
1.	"Your Blue Room" (radio edit)	4:34
2.	"Your Blue Room" (album version)	5:28

== Personnel ==
Passengers

- Bono – vocals
- Adam Clayton – bass guitar, narration
- The Edge – guitar, organ
- Brian Eno – synthesisers
- Larry Mullen Jr. – drums, percussion

Technical

- Brian Eno – mixing, sequencing
- Danton Supple – audio engineering
