= Cellist of Sarajevo =

The cellist of Sarajevo could refer to:

- Vedran Smailović, a cellist who played during the Siege of Sarajevo
- The Cellist of Sarajevo, a novel by Steven Galloway, inspired by Smailović
