= Wellburn =

Wellburn is a surname. Notable people with the surname include:

- Elizabeth Wellburn (born 1955), Canadian author
- Gerald Wellburn (1900–1992), Canadian philatelist
- Thomas Wellburn (born 1980) British Jewellery designer
