= Pavarotti & Friends for the Children of Bosnia =

Live album by Luciano Pavarotti and Various Artists
- Released: 1995
- Label: Decca (USA), London
- Producer: Mike Woolcock

Pavarotti & Friends for the Children of Bosnia is a live Luciano Pavarotti album released on Decca Records in 1995.

== Background ==
Between 1992 and 2003 Luciano Pavarotti hosted 10 concerts at Parco Novi Sad in Modena, Italy. These events were known as Pavarotti & Friends and were in support of humanitarian causes. For the most part Pavarotti invited non opera singers to sing with him which resulted in a very innovative and well received collaboration between Pavarotti and popular popstars. Pavarotti donated the proceeds from some of these concerts to Afghan, Angolan and Iraqi refugees. In 1995 the concert was for the children of Bosnia affected by the war. The event featured artists such as Meat Loaf and Bono, the Edge and Brian Eno, (performing as Passengers, and Nenad Bach, Croatian - American artist and activist. and was attended by Diana, Princess of Wales. Bono and Edge played the live debut of Miss Sarajevo. Proceeds from this concert were used to help build the Pavarotti Music Center in Mostar.

== Track listing ==
1. "Per colpa di chi" - (with Zucchero)
2. "Serenata rap - Mattinata" - (with Jovanotti)
3. "Can We Go Higher?" - (with Nenad Bach)
4. "Ordinary World" - (with Simon Le Bon)
5. "Can I Touch You...There" - (with Michael Bolton)
6. "Clap Clap" - (with Gam Gam)
7. "Miss Sarajevo" - (with The Passengers (Bono, The Edge, Brian Eno))
8. "Così celeste" - (with Zucchero)
9. "Linger" - (with Dolores O'Riordan and Simon Le Bon)
10. "Come back to Sorrento" - (with Meat Loaf)
11. "Penso positivo" - (with Jovanotti)
12. "Vesti la giubba" - (with Michael Bolton)
13. "Heaven Can Wait" - (with Meat Loaf)
14. "Ave Maria" - (with Dolores O'Riordan)
15. "One" - (with The Passengers (Bono, The Edge, Brian Eno))
16. "The Long Black Veil" - (with The Chieftains)
17. "Funiculì funiculà" - (with The Chieftains)
18. "Nessun dorma" - (all together)

== The Pavarotti & Friends Concert Series ==
- September 27, 1992
- September 13, 1994
- September 12, 1995 - Together for the Children of Bosnia
- June 8, 1996 - for War Child
- June 9, 1998 - for the Children of Liberia
- June 1, 1999 - for Guatemala and Kosovo
- June 6, 2000 - for Cambodia and Tibet
- May 29, 2001 - for Afghanistan
- May 28, 2002 - for Angola
- May 27, 2003 - SOS Iraq
