= Akiko Kobayashi (singer) =

Japanese singer-songwriter (born 1958)

Akiko Kobayashi (小林明子, Kobayashi Akiko; born November 5, 1958), also known by her alias Holi, is a Japanese singer, songwriter, composer and arranger.

Kobayashi collaborated with Brian Eno and U2 on their 1995 project, the Passengers. Her smash hit debut song, "Koi ni Ochite -Fall in love-" (恋におちて -Fall in love-) from 1985s popular show "Kinyōbi no Tsumatachi e" made her famous in Japan.

She was born in Tokyo and first began singing at age 15 and writing, later, songs for other artists that became big hits at home and abroad making her famous. She received a degree in philosophy from the prestigious Gakushuin University in Tokyo. Her first proper job in the music industry was as a secretary at a music publishing company, which she got through a professor from university. She debuted as a writer in 1984, writing the song "Moon Eyes" for folk duo Bread & Butter. Then, in 1985, she released her debut single "Koi ni Ochite -Fall in love-" (恋におちて -Fall in love-). The song became an instant hit, and earned Kobayashi a nomination for best newcomer at the 27th Japan Record Awards. Staff that worked on the recording began to compare Kobayashi's voice to that of Karen Carpenter, lead singer of The Carpenters, and suggested she approach Richard Carpenter. After hearing her demo tape, and enjoying the melody and vocals, Richard announced that her album "City of Angels" would be released in 1988.

In 1991, Kobayashi relocated to the United Kingdom and released an album under the name "holi". Soon after, she released a cover album of The Carpenters' songs. In 2001, she married a now retired British accountant.

== Discography ==
=== Singles ===
#	Title	Release date
1	"Koi ni Ochite – Fall in Love-" (恋におちて -Fall in love-; "Fall in Love -Fall in Love-")	August 31, 1985
2	"Shinjitsu" (真実; "Truth")	February 1, 1986
3	"Ai wa Enajī" (愛はエナジー; "Love is Energy")	May 22, 1986
4	"Kokoro Midarete: Say it with flowers" (心みだれて～Say it with flowers～)	October 6, 1986
5	"Kokoro Midarete: Say it with flowers (12-inch Single)" (心みだれて～Say it with flowers～ 《12インチシングル》)	1986
6	"Kuchibiru Swing" (くちびるスウィング; Lip Swing)	February 4, 1987
7	"Your Magic"; Duet with Jirō Sugita	June 21, 1987
8	"Touch Me Asa ga Kuru Made" (Touch Me 朝がくるまで; Touch Me Until the Morning Comes)	January 25, 1988
9	"Ai to Yasuragi no Naka de－How could I ask for more??" (愛とやすらぎの中で－How could I ask for more??; In Love and Peace – How could I ask for more?)	April 25, 1988
10	"Only The Angels Know"	July 25, 1988
11	"Hand in Hand"	September 17, 1988
12	"Yo-Te-Amo: Koi no Chaser" (YO-TE-AMO～恋のチェイサー; Yo-Te-Amo: Love Chaser)	September 1, 1989
13	"Be Together"	May 25, 1989
14	"Merry Christmas to You"	November 16, 1989
15	"Diga Mais... Motto Itte" (DIGA MAIS…～もっと言って; Diga Mais... Say More)	December 21, 1989
16	"Kokoro no Siesta" (心のシエスタ; Siesta of the Heart)	March 25, 1990
17	"Celebrate Tonight"	July 1, 1990
18	"Kokoro no Honō" (こころの炎; Flaming Heart)	July 25, 1990
19	"Machiwabite" (待ちわびて; Expectant)	March 23, 1991
20	"Koi ni Ochite -Fall in Love-" (恋におちて -Fall in love-; "Fall in Love -Fall in Love-"); Self-cover	November 14, 2007
21	"Kokoro Midarete: Say it with flowers" (心みだれて～Say it with flowers～)	November 25, 2009

=== Albums ===
==== Original albums ====
#	Title	Release date
1	"Fall in Love"	November 30, 1985
2	"Kokoro no Mama ni" (心のままに; Still in My Heart)	September 3, 1986
3	"Naturally"	September 5, 1987
4	"City of Angels"	March 25, 1988
5	"Bon Voyage"	September 1, 1989
6	"La Siesta"	June 1, 1990
7	"Beloved"	September 27, 2001

==== Special albums ====
#	Title	Release date
1	"True Love" "Best of" album	December 20, 1986
2	"In Concert ~A changing~" Live album	August 5, 1987
3	"The Luxury of Life ~Best Love Songs~" "Best of" album	November 1, 1990
4	"The Spice of Life ~Best Love Songs 2~" "Best of" album	October 25, 1991
5	"Singles" "Best of" album	November 1, 1992
6	"Fall in Love Forever ~Akiko Meets Richard Carpenter~" "Best of" album	November 21, 1996
7	"A Song For You ~Carpenters Anthology~ (A Song For You～カーペンターズ・アンソロジー～)"; Tribute album	March 5, 2003
8	Golden☆Best: Akiko Kobayashi (GOLDEN☆BEST 小林明子) "Best of" album	December 22, 2004

==== As "holi" ====
#	Title	Release date
1	"under the monkey puzzle tree"	1994
2	"Dreamescape"	December 10, 2005

== Cover renditions ==
- "Una At Huling Mamahalin" (translated in Japanese English song as "Fall In Love") - a Filipino pop ballad rendition by Louie Heredia in 1996, and also covered by Filipino pop singer Kimpoy Feliciano in 2008.
