= Vedran Smailović =

Bosnian musician (born 1956)

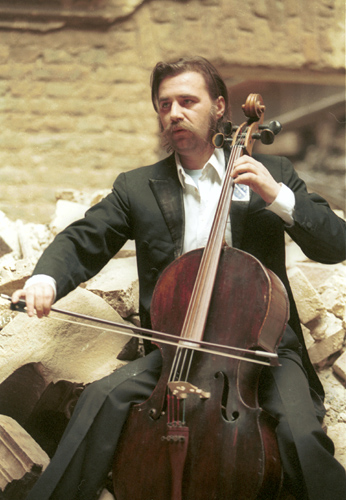
- Smailović in Sarajevo, 1992
- Born: 11 November 1956 (age 69); Sarajevo, SR Bosnia and Herzegovina, SFR Yugoslavia
- Occupations: Classical cellist; Composer; Academic teacher

Vedran Smailović (born 11 November 1956), known as the "Cellist of Sarajevo", is a Bosnian musician. During the siege of Sarajevo, he played Albinoni's Adagio in G minor in ruined buildings, and, often under the threat of snipers, he played during funerals. His bravery inspired musical numbers and the novel The Cellist of Sarajevo by Steven Galloway. He moved to Northern Ireland and is a composer, conductor, and performer. His playing of the Albinoni Adagio was introduced in a book called "A Story Like the Wind".

== Background ==
Smailović played in the Sarajevo Opera, the Sarajevo Philharmonic Orchestra, the Symphony Orchestra RTV Sarajevo, and the National Theatre of Sarajevo.

== The Cellist of Sarajevo ==
Smailović caught the imagination of people around the world by playing his cello, most notably performing Albinoni's Adagio in G minor for twenty-two days, in the ruined square of a downtown Sarajevo marketplace after a mortar round had killed twenty-two people waiting for food there. He managed to leave Sarajevo in 1993, during the second year of the siege that ultimately lasted 1,425 days, from 5 April 1992 to 29 February 1996. He is often mistakenly identified as a member of the Sarajevo String Quartet, which played on throughout the siege.

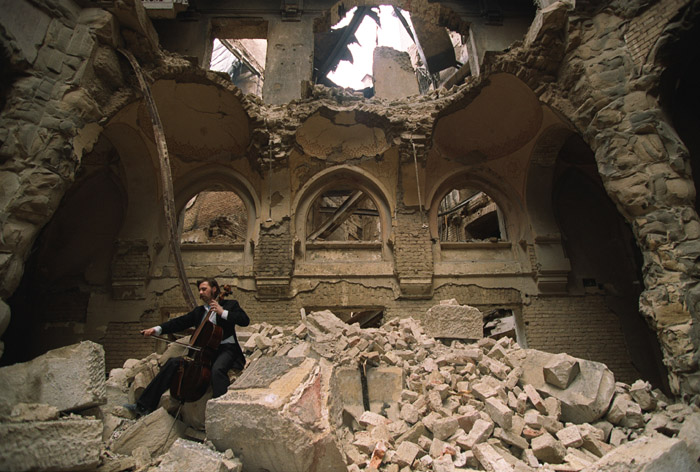
Smailović performing in Sarajevo's partially destroyed National Library in 1992

In Smailović's honour, composer David Wilde wrote a piece for solo cello, The Cellist of Sarajevo, which was recorded by Yo-Yo Ma. Paul O'Neill described Smailović's performances as the inspiration for "Christmas Eve/Sarajevo 12/24" by Savatage and the Trans-Siberian Orchestra. Folk singer John McCutcheon also penned a song in his honour, "In the Streets of Sarajevo." The South African singer and songwriter Coenie de Villiers wrote a song in Afrikaans, called "Die tjeiis van Sarajevo (The cellist of Sarajevo)", which was included in his 2011 album Hart van glas (Heart of glass).

Canadian author Elizabeth Wellburn worked with Smailović to create the children's book Echoes from the Square (1998). Another Canadian author, Steven Galloway, based a character on Smailović in his bestselling 2008 novel, The Cellist of Sarajevo. In the book, an unnamed cellist plays every day at 4:00 pm for 22 days, always at the same time and location, to honour the 22 people killed by a mortar bomb while they queued for bread on May 26, 1992. The account, including the time of the mortar attack, is fictional. Smailović publicly expressed outrage over the book's publication, he said, "They steal my name and identity," and added that he expected damages, an apology, and compensation. In 2012, a meeting between Smailović and Galloway took place during which the latter assured he meant no harm in telling a fictional representation of the events.

== Continued career ==
Smailović escaped from Sarajevo in late 1993, and has since been involved in numerous music projects as a performer, composer, and conductor. He now lives in Warrenpoint, Northern Ireland.

Smailović was named a Hero's hero by The My Hero Project.

== See also ==
- Inela Nogić, Miss Sarajevo 1993
- Romeo and Juliet in Sarajevo, a documentary film about a couple killed trying to escape from Sarajevo
