= Ibanez Musician Bass =

1979–1987 line of electric base guitars produced by Ibanez Corporation

The Ibanez Musician Bass was a line of electric bass guitars produced by the Ibanez Corporation from 1979 until 1987.

== History ==
The Musician series was introduced in 1979 with the MC-800 and MC-900 models, which were available in natural (NT) and "dark-stain" (DS) finishes. List price for the MC-800 was $655.00 USD for the NT finish and $665.00 USD for the DS finish. List price for the MC-900 was $775.00 USD for the NT finish and $785.00 USD for the DS finish. The MC-800 was a single-pickup design, while the MC-900 had two pickups and a three-band EQ.

The 1980 price list retains the MC-800 and MC-900, in both NT and DS finishes, but adds the MC-824, MC-924, MC-940, and MC-980 (8-string), all of which were DS models.

The 1981 catalog lists four models: MC-824, MC-924, MC-924L, and MC-940. All four models were DS models, as the natural (NT) finish was no longer an option. The MC-824 was the base model, the MC-924 added a three-band EQ. The MC-924L was a left-handed version of the MC-924. The MC-940 was a fretless version of the same.

The 1983 catalog retains only two models, the MC-924 and MC-940, but introduces a new finish option, polar white (PW). The 1983-1984 catalog shows a reintroduction of the MC-824DS and an additional finish option, metallic black (MB), for the MC-924 and MC-940 models.

The 1984 price list retains the 1983 models and introduces the MC-888, sometimes referred to as the "bean bass," which featured a smaller body.

In 1986, only two models remain. The MC-924 is renamed MC2924 and the MC-940 is renamed MC2940. Their body shape is redesigned and looks more like what would eventually become the SoundGear line. These are the only two Musician models in the 1987 price list.

== Features ==
The Musician Bass featured a 34" scale neck-through design. The neck was 5-piece neck, constructed of three pieces of rock maple, with two strips of walnut in between them. The body was initially made from a sandwich of mahogany and ash - a mahogany core, with ash on the front and back. The mahogany core was discontinued in '82, leaving it with a solid ash body. From '79 to '81 they used Ibanez Super 4, single coil 'soapbar' pickups, which were also used in the Roadster basses of the same period. Starting in '82 they change to Ibanez Super P5 and Super J5 pickups, which were Precision and Jazz Bass style pickups in Ibanez' own covers. The MC824 model used a single J6 humbucking pickup with the Ibanez Tri-Sound switch, allowing series, parallel and single coil operation. All Musicians were passive basses, but the majority of models included an active equalizer circuit that could be switched in or out. From '79 to '81 they used a 3-way selector switch to change between the pickups. From '82 onward the two pickup models lost the switch and gained a blend control.

== Endorsees ==
The various Musician models were endorsed and/or used by several high-profile musicians, including Sting of The Police, Adam Clayton of U2, Fleetwood Mac's John McVie, The Who's John Entwistle, Mark Egan, Dee Dee Ramone, Mike Porcaro of Toto, Victor Bailey and James Freud of Australian band The Models. Sting's fretless Musician is said to be the instrument he used most in The Police. Adam Clayton used his Musicians as his main instruments from around 1981 through to 1984. He owned an MC824DS, which he favored, and an MC924DS. He later owned and used an MC888 'Bean' bass, which the Edge used for the song "40" on the original Joshua Tree tour and can be seen in shots taken while recording the Zooropa album. Clayton used the MC888 for 'With or Without You' on the '17 Joshua Tree tour.

== Commemorative model ==
In 2009, Ibanez produced a limited run of 15 MC30TH 30th anniversary Musician basses. The instruments were supposed to be the same as the original pre 1982 models, although differed in some significant ways. The body was ash, which they'd changed to in 1982, rather than the original ash/mahogany sandwich, but the biggest difference was with the electronics. The Ibanez advertising claimed they had reproduced the original Super 4 single coil pickups and EQ-B preamp/eq. The pickups, which featured wooden covers, were actually humbuckers that sounded nothing like the original single coil models and the preamp was a completely different circuit to the advertised EQ-B. Cosmetically they looked very similar to the pre 1982 models, with the addition of very ornate inlays on the fretboard and headstock and the wooden pickup covers. Built by their best craftsmen, the construction was outstanding. With a list price of US$10,666.65 in 2009, it took a long time for all the basses to sell.
