= Elizabeth Wellburn =

Canadian author (born 1955)

- Born: February 16, 1955 (age 71)
- Occupations: Author, educator
- Writing career
- Genre: Children's literature

Elizabeth Wellburn is a Canadian author. Her writing has been in the areas of fiction for children and educational technology.

In 1998, Wellburn's book Echoes From the Square (ISBN 0-921156-99-5) was published. It tells a fictionalized story based on the real musician, Vedran Smailovic adding the character of a young boy who learns to cope in the aftermath of war in Sarajevo. The paintings for the book were created by her partner Deryk Houston.

Wellburn also co-authored the book The ABCs of Language Development: Discover Language with Your Child.

Wellburn, Houston, and their children live in Victoria, British Columbia.
