= Inela Nogić =

Bosnian model, graphic designer and writer (born 1976)

- Nogić on the cover of the U2 single Miss Sarajevo
- Born: 1976 (age 49–50); Sarajevo, SR Bosnia and Herzegovina
- Occupations: Model, Graphic designer, Writer
- Known for: Miss Besieged Sarajevo, Siege of Sarajevo, U2 concert in Sarajevo
- Children: 2

Inela Nogić (born 1976) became world-famous during the Siege of Sarajevo when she won the 1993 Miss Besieged Sarajevo contest, which was held in a movie theatre. Nogić and the other contestants held up a banner that read "Don't let them kill us". The pageant was documented by an amateur filmmaker, whose footage director Bill Carter then used in his documentary Miss Sarajevo. The documentary was broadcast internationally, provoking a viewer response that added to the international pressure to end the siege. Footage of the documentary was incorporated into the single "Miss Sarajevo" by the Irish band U2 together with Brian Eno and the Italian opera singer Luciano Pavarotti. Nogić's picture was also featured on the cover of the single, taken during the pageant. Nogić was 17 years old at the time.

After the war ended, Nogić was invited to the 1997 concert given by U2 in Sarajevo, and personally escorted by the band.

As of 2012, Nogić has been living in the Netherlands and is a mother of two.

In 2026, Nogić published the memoir Miss opkoljenog Sarajeva, released by Croatian publisher Hena Com.

The memoir was presented at a public promotion in Sarajevo in April 2026.

== See also ==
- Vedran Smailović, known as the "Cellist of Sarajevo"
- Romeo and Juliet in Sarajevo
- Miss Sarajevo
