= Joe Bonnie =

Irish musician

Joe Bonnie was a well-known Irish drummer. He tutored Larry Mullen Jr. of U2 in the drums in 1971 until his daughter Monica took over the lessons.
