= Brady Drum Company =

Australian drum manufacturing company

- Type: Private
- Industry: Musical Instrument Manufacturing
- Genre: Drums
- Founded: 1980
- Founder: Chris Brady
- Defunct: 24 November 2015; 10 years ago
- Headquarters: Armadale, Australia
- Products: Drums
- Website: Official website

Brady Drum Company was an Australian manufacturing company who specialised in handcrafted drums since 1980. The designs and workmanship was predominantly the duty of the company's creator, Chris Brady. The firm used native Australian hardwoods, particularly jarrah, sheoak, spotted gum, marri, wandoo and lemon scented gum for the drums they manufactured. The business was based in Armadale, an outer suburb of Perth, Western Australia.

== History ==
Chris Brady introduced the world's first solid wood (hollow tree trunk) modern snare drum, and revolutionised the ply shell and block shell method of construction. He possibly created the world's first 10", 12" and 16" snare drums, and is credited with their popularisation in modern music.

== Drum construction ==
Brady's original micro-marquetry style of badge construction

Brady Drums were notable for several factors of their drum construction. Firstly, the original badge was hand-made using a meticulous micro-marquetry technique using at least 31 different wood species to create the image of the drummer, drum, and trade mark. Secondly, Brady Drums first used a single ply drum shell made not from bent wood, but a hollowed out trunk which was also an industry first, and likely helped Brady propel in notoriety.

The company's client list includes many drummers such as Will Calhoun, Steve Ferrone, Mick Fleetwood, Chad Smith, Patrick Wante, Jeff Porcaro (formerly), Larry Mullen, Jr, Tre Cool and Thomas Lang. Though the company manufactured all drums shells, their fame is gained from their snare drums.

In April 2015, Brady Drum Company ceased production of their instruments, following Chris Brady's ongoing health complications. In November 2015, Brady Drum Company announced the closure of the company via its official website and Facebook page.
