= Original Soundtracks 1 =

Studio album by U2 and Brian Eno (as Passengers)
- Released: 6 November 1995
- Recorded: November 1994 – July 1995
- Studios: Westside Studios (London); Hanover Quay (Dublin)
- Genres: Electronic; experimental rock; ambient; post-rock
- Length: 58:10
- Label: Island

U2 chronology
Melon: Remixes for Propaganda (1995)	Original Soundtracks 1 (1995)	Pop (1997)

Brian Eno chronology
Spinner (1995)	Original Soundtracks 1 (1995)	The Drop (1997)

Singles from Original Soundtracks 1
- 1. "Miss Sarajevo" Released: 20 November 1995

Original Soundtracks 1 is a studio album recorded by the Irish rock band U2 and English producer Brian Eno as a side project under the pseudonym Passengers. Released on 6 November 1995, the album is a collection of songs written for mostly imaginary films (the exceptions being songs for Ghost in the Shell, Miss Sarajevo, and Beyond the Clouds). Owing to Eno's involvement as a full songwriting partner and the album's experimental nature, the moniker "Passengers" was chosen to distinguish it from U2's conventional albums, as it featured a far more electronic-heavy, stripped-back post-rock sound that contrasted heavily with the grander music they were usually known for. It was commercially unnoticed by the band's standards and received generally mixed reviews. Guest musicians on the record included Italian opera singer Luciano Pavarotti (on "Miss Sarajevo") and producer Howie B (on "Elvis Ate America"), who would co-produce U2's following album, Pop (1997). The art-pop single Miss Sarajevo, featuring Luciano Pavarotti, did rather successfully upon release.

== Background ==
According to the producer Brian Eno, near the end of the recording sessions for U2's 1993 album Zooropa, the band hit "a stone wall" and were getting obsessive about small details. At that point, Eno suggested the group do some improvisation, "just turn the tape on and play, so we were working with a broad brush rather than the one-hair brushes we'd been using. It was designed to open us up a little". The resulting recording sessions were productive enough that Eno advocated the band undertake more.

== Writing and recording ==
After U2 completed their Zoo TV Tour in December 1993, the band returned to the studio with no particular agenda or project on which to work. Their original intention was to record a soundtrack for Peter Greenaway's 1996 film The Pillow Book. Although the plan did not come to fruition, Eno suggested they continue recording music suitable for film soundtracks, as he did with his Music for Films album series. At the time, the U.S. charts were dominated by movie soundtrack albums and singles. Once Eno pointed out that the project would not be a real ploy for radio airplay but rather a spoof of one, U2 agreed to the concept.

Recording sessions for Original Soundtracks 1 began with a two-week session in November 1994 at Westside Studios in London, and continued for another five weeks in mid-1995 at Hanover Quay Studios in Dublin. Lead vocalist Bono felt that the visual suggestion from the music was more important than the story told by the lyrics, so the band tried to create visual music when recording. U2 spent time in Shinjuku, Tokyo, at the end of the Zoo TV Tour in 1993, and their experience in the city influenced the recording sessions. The vivid colours of the street signs and billboards reminded them of the set of the 1982 science-fiction film Blade Runner. Part of the group's intent was to make a "night-time" record. Bono said, "It feels like it's been set on the bullet train in Tokyo. Every record has a location, a place where you enjoy listening to it, whether that be a bedroom or a club, well this record location is a fast train. It's slo-mo music though. But it has an odd sense of speed in the background." U2 had frequently improvised in the past, and for the Original Soundtracks 1 sessions, they jammed to video clips from various films.

Eno said, "Listening to the original improvisations as they came off the floor, you feel the excitement of the process ... You have to be careful not to disturb the organic flow of the thing." As producer, he had most of the artistic control during the sessions, limiting U2's creative input on the recordings. Guitarist the Edge said that "Seibu" (later retitled to "Slug"), "Miss Sarajevo" and "Your Blue Room" were the only three tracks from the album in which U2 "really dug in [their] heels and did more work on and tried to craft". The group brought in producer Howie B to cut down and mix some of the tracks after several hours of jam sessions had been recorded.

Eno alluded to some extra tracks that were recorded with the Japanese singer Holi at the time and that they may be released at some point in the future: "...in fact we did several things together in four hours. Some of the other pieces are really lovely too, and I'm sure will see the light of day. But she was absolutely fantastic."

The record was ultimately borne from about 25 hours of recorded experimentation. Details of the recording sessions were documented in Eno's 1996 book A Year with Swollen Appendices.

== Composition ==
About half of the album is instrumental, and the vocal tracks depart from U2’s typical style, taking a more experimental approach. While melodic elements are still present, the overall sound differs from the band’s usual work. “Miss Sarajevo,” featuring Italian tenor Luciano Pavarotti, has been noted as a standout track.

One of the tracks, "Your Blue Room", features Adam Clayton reciting the final verse. This marks only his second recorded vocal on a U2 project, the first being on "Endless Deep", the B-side to 1983's "Two Hearts Beat as One".

The album alleges to be a collection of songs written for movies, hence the title Original Soundtracks. The album's booklet contains detailed descriptions of the film for which each song was written. Most of the films are non-existent; however, three of the 13 films listed on the album are real: Beyond the Clouds, Miss Sarajevo, and Ghost in the Shell ("One Minute Warning" played during the closing credits).

This concept can be seen as something of a successor to Eno's Music for Films album and is also the base of the Dutch electronic duo Arling & Cameron's album Music for Imaginary Films.

The track "Always Forever Now" appeared only briefly in the film Heat, but was included in the soundtrack, which also includes other tracks by Brian Eno. The track "Plot 180" was also used in the film Heat but only in a deleted scene.

The film descriptions contain many hidden references and in-jokes, beginning with the descriptions' supposed authors, "Ben O'Rian and C. S. J. Bofop", both references to Brian Eno. The first is a simple anagram of the name, while the second replaces each letter with the alphabetically following letter.

== Release and promotion ==
"Miss Sarajevo" was released as a successful single, competing in the UK for the 1995 Christmas number 1 spot but ultimately losing to Michael Jackson's "Earth Song", however; it also later appeared on U2's The Best of 1990–2000 compilation in 2002. "Your Blue Room" was intended for the second single following "Miss Sarajevo," but was cancelled after poor album sales. The song was later released as a B-side on the "Staring at the Sun" single in 1997, and on the B-sides disc of The Best of 1990–2000.

The Japanese edition release include "Bottoms (Watashitachi No Ookina Yume) (Zoo Station Remix)" as a bonus track, which is also featured as B-side to the "Miss Sarajevo" single. The track is an instrumental version of the U2 song "Zoo Station", which appears on 1991's Achtung Baby. The Japanese subtitle "Watashitachi No Ookina Yume" translates to English as "our big dream." Some UK promo copies of the album list "Bottoms" as well but the track is not actually present on the compact disc.

For Record Store Day 2025, the album was reissued as a two-disc vinyl LP for its 30th anniversary.

== Reception ==
Professional ratings
Review scores
Source	Rating
AllMusic	3/5 stars
The Boston Globe	favourable
Entertainment Weekly	B
Hot Press	10/12
Los Angeles Times	3.5/4 stars
Q	4/5 stars
Rolling Stone	2/5 stars
Spin	5/10

Because of the nature of the music and the decision to release it under another name, the album is easily the least-known and poorest-selling in the U2 catalogue. Further, critical reaction from the fans and even the band members has been mixed. Spin wrote that the album came as a "treat to Brian Eno fans" and as a "shock to U2 fans", only furthering the experimentation that was present on Zooropa into something that was U2's "most ambient and minimalistic work to date". Drummer Larry Mullen Jr. stated: "There's a thin line between interesting music and self-indulgence. We crossed it on the Passengers record." Later reflecting on the album in 2002, Mullen stated, "It hasn't grown on me. However, 'Miss Sarajevo' is a classic." Bono objected to Mullen's statement in the same documentary, claiming that "Larry just didn't like [Passengers] because we didn't let him play the drums."

However, despite the poor commercial performance of the album, it quickly became a cult classic, with many appreciating the ambient, ethereal sound of the album. Lonk Lainesse of AllMusic stated that although the album "went under the radar", it was "highly experimental at the time and should be considered as a prelude to Radiohead's future experimentations, with delicate, spacious guitar work from the Edge" and is "very much U2's post-rock moment", comparing the album to Wah Wah (1994) by James, as well as Pygmalion (1995) by Slowdive, both bands that Eno had previously worked with; all three albums featured electronic experimentation and a very minimalistic, ambient sound, all three albums were closely related to the first wave of post-rock, and all three albums underperformed commercially. According to Chris Vrenna, Original Soundtracks 1 was influential to Guns N' Roses vocalist Axl Rose during the writing and recording of the sessions for what became Chinese Democracy (2008).

== Track listing ==
All tracks are written by Passengers (Brian Eno, Bono, Adam Clayton, The Edge, and Larry Mullen Jr.) "Ito Okashi" co-written by Holi. "Elvis Ate America" co-written by Howie B.

Original Soundtracks 1 track listing
No.	Title	Film listed for song	Length
1.	"United Colours"	United Colours of Plutonium (Japan)	5:31
2.	"Slug"	Slug (Germany)	4:41
3.	"Your Blue Room"	Par-delà les nuages / Beyond the Clouds (Italy)	5:28
4.	"Always Forever Now"	Always Forever Now (Hong Kong)	6:24
5.	"A Different Kind of Blue"	An Ordinary Day (USA)	2:02
6.	"Beach Sequence"	Par-delà les nuages / Beyond the Clouds (Italy)	3:31
7.	"Miss Sarajevo" (featuring Luciano Pavarotti)	Miss Sarajevo (USA)	5:40
8.	"Ito Okashi" (featuring Holi)	Ito Okashi / Something Beautiful (Japan)	3:25
9.	"One Minute Warning"	Ghost in the Shell (Japan)	4:40
10.	"Corpse (These Chains Are Way Too Long)"	Gibigiane / Reflections (Italy)	3:35
11.	"Elvis Ate America" (featuring Howie B)	Elvis Ate America (USA)	3:00
12.	"Plot 180"	Hypnotize (Love Me 'til Dawn) (UK)	3:41
13.	"Theme from The Swan"	The Swan (Hungary)	3:24
14.	"Theme from Let's Go Native"	Let's Go Native (South Africa)	3:08
Total length:			58:10

Bonus track (Japan only)
No.	Title	Film listed for song	Length
15.	"Bottoms (Watashitachi No Ookina Yume)" ("Zoo Station" remix)	Bottoms (Australia)	4:11
Total length:			62:14

== Personnel ==
Passengers

- Bono – vocals, rhythm guitar, piano on "Beach Sequence"
- Adam Clayton – bass guitar, additional guitar, percussion, narration on "Your Blue Room"
- The Edge – lead guitar, keyboards, backing vocals, lead vocals on "Corpse," church organ on "Your Blue Room"
- Brian Eno – strategies, sequencers, keyboards, guitar, treatments, mixing, backing and chorus vocals, vocals on "A Different Kind of Blue", production
- Larry Mullen Jr. – drums, percussion, rhythm sequence on "One Minute Warning," rhythm synthesizer on "United Colours"

Additional personnel

- Luciano Pavarotti – tenor voice on "Miss Sarajevo"
- Holi – vocals on "Ito Okashi," voices on "One Minute Warning"
- Howie B – mixing, treatments, scratching, and rhythm track on "Elvis Ate America"
- Craig Armstrong – string arrangement on "Miss Sarajevo"
- Paul Barrett – string arrangement on "Always Forever Now"
- Des Broadbery – sequencer on "Always Forever Now"
- David Herbert – saxophone on "United Colours" and "Corpse"
- Holger Zschenderlein – additional synthesizer on "One Minute Warning"

== Charts ==
Chart performance for Original Soundtracks 1
Chart (1995)	Peak position
Australian Albums (ARIA)	11
Austrian Albums (Ö3 Austria)	40
Belgian Albums (Ultratop Flanders)	35
Belgian Albums (Ultratop Wallonia)	14
Canadian Albums (RPM)	15
Dutch Albums (Album Top 100)	38
Finnish Albums (Suomen virallinen lista)	32
New Zealand Albums (RMNZ)	9
Scottish Albums (Official Charts)	18
Swedish Albums (Sverigetopplistan)	28
UK Albums (OCC)	12
US Billboard 200	76

== Certifications ==
Certifications for Original Soundtracks 1
Region	Certification	Certified units/sales
Canada (Music Canada)	Gold	50,000^{^}
United Kingdom (BPI)	Gold	100,000^{*}
^{*} Sales figures based on certification alone.^{^} Shipments figures based on certification alone.

== See also ==
- Heat – Soundtrack album to the 1995 film Heat
- Music for Films – A similar concept album series by Eno solo
