= Steven Galloway (writer) =

Canadian novelist and a former professor

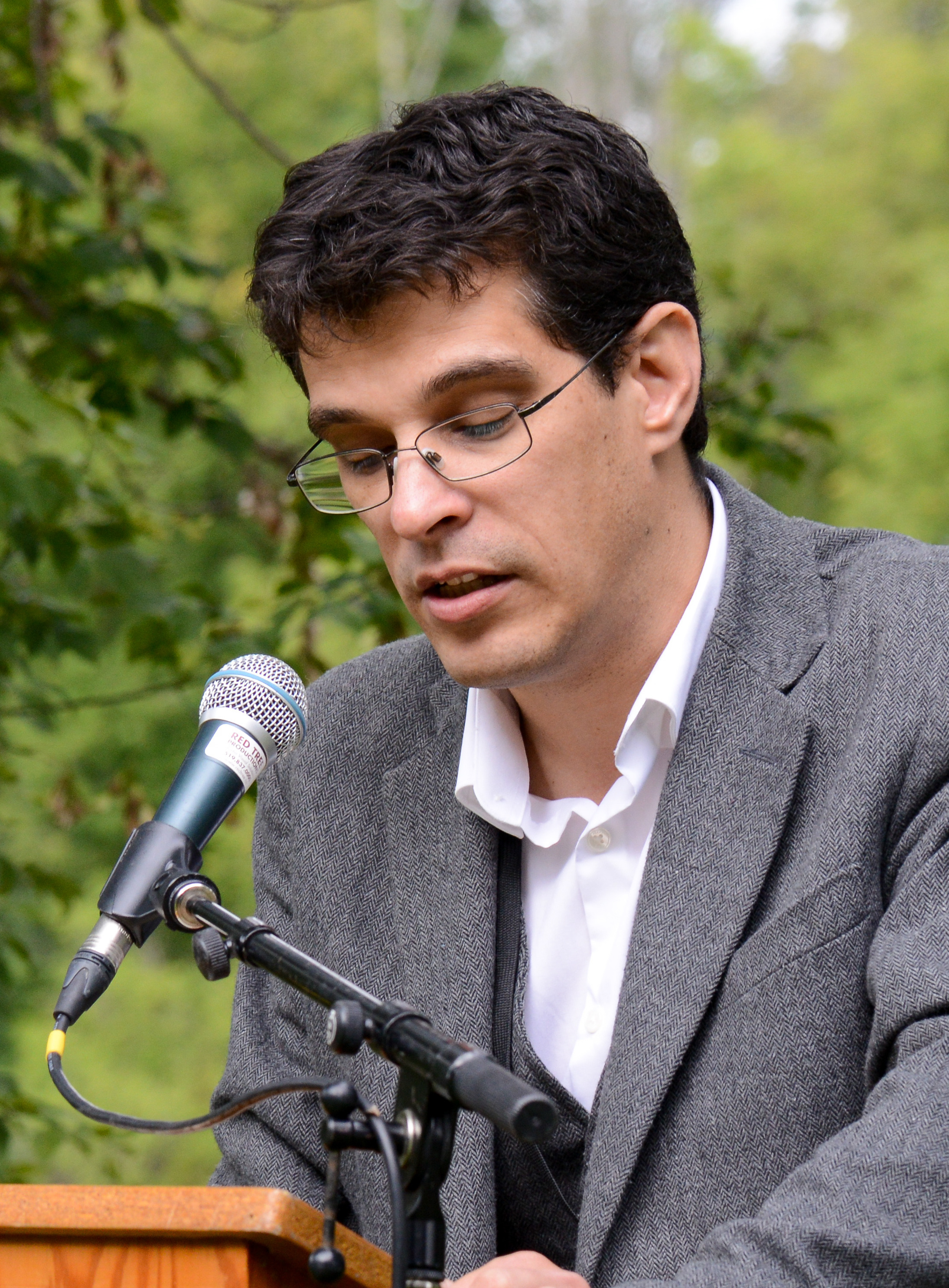
- Galloway at the Eden Mills Writers' Festival in 2014
- Born: July 13, 1975 (age 51); Vancouver, British Columbia, Canada
- Occupation: Writer
- Writing career
- Notable work: The Cellist of Sarajevo

Steven Galloway (born July 13, 1975) is a Canadian novelist and a former professor at the University of British Columbia. He is the author of the award-winning novel The Cellist of Sarajevo (2008).

== Early life ==
Galloway was born in Vancouver, and raised in Kamloops, British Columbia. He attended the University College of the Cariboo and the University of British Columbia (UBC).

== Career ==
Galloway taught creative writing at the University of British Columbia for many years. He also taught writing at Simon Fraser University. He published his first novel, Finnie Walsh, in 2000, a second novel, Ascension, in 2003, and a third book, The Cellist of Sarajevo, in 2008.

In 2013 Galloway became a tenured associate professor at UBC, and served as acting chair of the creative writing program. In 2014 he published his fourth novel, The Confabulist. In 2015 he was confirmed in the position of chair.

== Legal issues ==
=== UBC suspension and termination ===
In November 2015, UBC announced that Galloway was suspended from his position with pay because allegations, which were not specified in the announcement, had been made against him. The Faculty Association of UBC criticized the institution for announcing the suspension, stating it was an invasion of privacy. From December to April, Mary Ellen Boyd, a former Justice of the Supreme Court of British Columbia conducted an investigation on behalf of UBC. In June 2016, Galloway was fired from the university; in announcing Galloway's termination, university spokesperson Philip Steenkamp cited "a record of misconduct that resulted in an irreparable breach of trust". The nature of the misconduct was not made public at the time. The Canadian Press spoke with five of the people who had filed complaints against Galloway, and found that complaints included alleged "sexual harassment, bullying, threats and an incident in which Galloway is accused of slapping a student".

In November 2016, a large group of Canadian authors, including Margaret Atwood and Yann Martel, signed an open letter, written by Joseph Boyden, criticizing UBC for carrying out its investigation in secret and denying Galloway the right to due process. Some of the authors, including Miriam Toews and Wayne Johnston, later withdrew their names and support. The letter caused controversy in the Canadian literary community, with some accusing the signatories of taking Galloway's side over that of his accusers.

=== Investigation and UBC lawsuit ===
In December 2016, Galloway revealed that he had had an affair with a student, for which he apologized. According to Galloway's lawyer Dan Burnett, Madame Justice Boyd conducted an exhaustive review of the whole of the evidence and found on a balance of probabilities that Galloway had not committed sexual assault; Boyd also dismissed several other allegations of misconduct against Galloway including all of the allegations brought by additional complainants. In 2018, UBC was forced to pay Galloway $167,000 for violating his privacy rights and damaging his reputation. On July 13, 2018, Galloway published an essay in the Toronto National Post asserting that he was "not a monster," despite what he felt had been a coordinated campaign to paint him as such, and revealed that the woman who had accused him of assault was the one with whom he had had the affair. Steenkamp told a local newspaper the same day, however, that the dismissal was "fully justified" and that the sexual allegations against Galloway were not the only issues the university had considered. This comment was ruled to be a breach of the confidentiality agreement, which forbade public comments on the reasons for Galloway's dismissal.

=== Defamation lawsuits ===
In October 2018, Galloway filed a defamation lawsuit against the woman who accused him of sexual assault, along with 20 others who had spread the allegations on Twitter and within UBC, in the Supreme Court of British Columbia. The defendants contended that this was an example of a strategic lawsuit against public participation. Before deciding whether to dismiss the suit, the BC Supreme Court ordered Galloway's accuser to make a series of documents available in discovery. This ruling, which the Supreme Court of Canada declined to review, was upheld by a panel consisting of Chief Justice Robert Bauman and two other judges in April 2020. The disclosure revealed that the accuser (referred to in court documents as A.B.) had copied a Fifth Estate reporter in her initial complaint to UBC president Martha Piper, contradicting some of her previous testimony. Exchanges with reporters led A.B. to write in a subsequent email that was at her insistence read out to all UBC Creative Writing Program Faculty that "the CBC legal team thought my evidence was damning." She referred to this claim as an exaggeration following a statement by CBC that no such vetting had taken place. This assertion of "vetting" was the underpinning of a threat to sue UBC and the Creative Writing Program if they did not acquiesce to her demand to take action against Galloway. As reported in the Globe and Mail, A.B. said:

What I am about to say is not a threat it is a fact: I spoke to a lawyer after I got off the phone with you because there is a case for me to sue the university. ... [There] is almost certainly a strong case for suing the Creative Writing Department. I am stating this as a fact – not a threat!!! I think that skeptical or shocked members of the department might need to know how much more serious this could get for the department. If they don't act.

A nine day hearing on the lawsuit began in April 2021. During the proceedings, one of A.B.'s friends argued that her tweets about Galloway were inconsequential and that she had already suffered career setbacks by criticizing him. Galloway described how the allegations against him had destroyed his life and career, specifically mentioning the fact that his publisher withdrew a three book contract in 2018, and how he had been reduced to doing manual labor jobs, including cleaning swimming pools, for a living. He also took issue with a critic's review of a 2018 art exhibit, featuring art by A.B., which described the alleged assault without naming Galloway. It was revealed that two defendants, UBC Professors Keith Maillard and Annabel Lyon, had organized the meeting which first alerted other department members to the allegations — a meeting which one attendee described as "[an effort to] protect students and faculty" and another described as "a toxic, traumatic event". Maillard and Lyon, who were on A.B.'s committee, rejected claims that their handling of the allegations was related to the fact that they had approved her application to graduate without a complete thesis.

On December 2, 2021, Justice Elaine Adair ruled that Galloway's suit was not a Strategic Lawsuit Against Public Participation" (SLAPP suit) and allowed him to proceed to trial against all but two of the defendants. Of those who Adair ruled had defamed him, she found that there were grounds to believe each was motivated by malice.

Writing about this hearing in the National Post, Adam Zivo summarized Adair's ruling:

“In response to ongoing harassment, Galloway launched a defamation lawsuit against 25 people, including A.B. The woman and 11 of her supporters responded with an anti-SLAPP objection, arguing that the defamation lawsuit violated their freedom of expression and would have a chilling effect on the reporting of sexual assault. In B.C., and elsewhere, legal actions can be blocked by a court if they are deemed a strategic lawsuit against public participation (SLAPP).

B.C. Supreme Court Justice Elaine Adair firmly rejected this argument in a ruling issued Dec. 2.

If the lawsuit were prevented, “There would be no legal consequences of any kind attached to publicly calling someone a rapist, completely outside of any formal reporting, and no obligation ever to prove the statement was true,” Adair wrote. “No distinction would be made between making a confidential report to an institution … and publishing on Twitter to the world. There would be no recourse — certainly not in civil proceedings — for the person publicly so accused. It is difficult to see how something so extreme and potentially reckless would be in the public interest.”

Adair's decision was appealed, and a hearing took place in May 2023 in the BC Court of Appeals. In January 2024, a three judge panel on the appeals court unanimously upheld Justice Adair's ruling and allowed Galloway's suit to proceed further to trial.

The defendants subsequently appealed to the Supreme Court of Canada in one last attempt to have the case dismissed. However, in October 2024, the Supreme Court refused to hear the case and rejected all appeals, with Galloway being awarded costs. This means that the defendants now have no more avenue of appeal and that the case will go to trial. The trial is now set to begin in October 2026 and is expected to last for up to twelve weeks. In the summer of 2026, Maillard and Lyon settled with Galloway. The terms of the settlement are confidential and remain unknown.

== Books ==
=== Finnie Walsh ===
Galloway's debut novel, Finnie Walsh (2000), was nominated for the Amazon.ca/Books in Canada First Novel Award. It was described as "a work about the love of hockey and the way two boys form a bond that carries them through life's tragedies and trials". Galloway was recognized for successfully portraying a child's perspective without "giving a child an adult's perspective". The ethnic and economic diversity of the characters had critics describing it as a "truly Canadian book both in content and sensibility". It was noted that "The style of Galloway's early literary influences, Farley Mowat and John Irving, is apparent" in this first novel.

=== Ascension ===
His second novel, Ascension (2003), was nominated for the BC Book Prizes' Ethel Wilson Fiction Prize, and has been translated into over fifteen languages. Notably different from his first novel, Ascension takes a look at the events in the life of a 66-year-old Romanian man leading up to his famous tight rope walking between the twin towers of New York's World Trade Center. "He expertly walks a very fine line, spinning the makings of what might have been a gimmicky immigrant tale into a gripping story of one man's lifelong balancing act."

=== The Cellist of Sarajevo ===
Galloway's third novel, The Cellist of Sarajevo (2008), was nominated for the International Dublin Literary Award, longlisted for the 2008 Scotiabank Giller Prize and won the 2009 Evergreen Award, the George Ryga Award for Social Awareness in Literature and the Borders Original Voices Award. It was heralded as "the work of an expert" by The Guardian, and has become an international bestseller with rights sold in over 30 countries.

The novel is set during the siege of Sarajevo in the mid-1990s and explores the dilemmas of ordinary people caught in the crisis. The title references the true story of Vedran Smailović, a cellist who played Albinoni's Adagio "dressed in evening tails and perching on a fire-scorched chair" every day for 22 days, "always at the same location", to "honour the 22 people killed by a mortar bomb while they queued for bread at 10 in the morning on May 26, 1992". The novel follows the lives of three fictional citizens of Sarajevo as they struggle to survive the war, including one who seeks to protect the cellist: "He has said he will do this for twenty-two days. This is the eighth. People see him. The world has seen him. We cannot allow him to be killed." The novel examines the gentleness found in humanity and the lasting and healing power of art.

Vedran Smailović did not learn of the book until after it had been published. Galloway had been advised to contact Smailović, who had purposefully embraced a quiet, private life in Warrenpoint, Northern Ireland, but did not do so. When Smailović learned of the publication, he expressed feelings of indignation and dismay, objecting to the use of his story and his personal information without permission or compensation, and pointing out differences between the story and his actual life. However, a meeting between the two took place in 2012, moving a step closer to conflict resolution.

Galloway claimed that Smailović's playing of the cello as a protest was a public act, that fiction writers were under no obligation to pay those who inspired them, and that it was unreasonable to expect them to do so. Galloway insisted that the cellist in his story, while inspired by the photos and story of Smailović, was imaginary. Galloway sent the cellist a signed copy of the book.

=== The Confabulist ===
The Confabulist is a story told some time after 2010 by an elderly man named Martin Strauss who claims to have killed Harry Houdini. Mostly employing flashbacks, the novel alternates between Houdini's point of view and Strauss's point of view to describe the years leading up to their 1926 encounter in Montreal. Several aspects are historically accurate including attempts to have Houdini join espionage circles, and his efforts to champion skepticism over spiritualism. However, it gradually becomes clear that Strauss is an unreliable narrator. The Confabulist was shortlisted for The Rogers Trust Fiction Prize and received favourable reviews from Marcia Kaye of The Toronto Star and Keith Donohue of The Washington Post. In the National Post, Zoe Whittall said "But this is Steven Galloway we're talking about — a brilliant Vancouver novelist, and the author of The Cellist of Sarajevo — and I believe that, no matter the setting or conceit, a good novelist can make anything worth your while. And Galloway is nothing if not a good novelist. I'm happy to report that The Confabulist, his fourth novel, is a stunning achievement." Conversely, Jenny Hendrix of the New York Times found the prose "perfunctory" and criticized the novel's "blunt method and clumsy misdirection".
