= Miss Sarajevo =

1995 single by U2 and Brian Eno

Single by Passengers featuring Luciano Pavarotti

from the album Original Soundtracks 1
- B-side: "Bottoms (Watashitachi no Ookina Yume)"; "Viva Davidoff"
- Released: 20 November 1995
- Studio: Westside (London); Hanover (Dublin)
- Genre: Rock; opera
- Length: 5:41 (album version); 5:19 (single edit); 4:32 (radio edit)
- Label: Island
- Songwriters: Brian Eno; Bono; Adam Clayton; The Edge; Larry Mullen Jr.
- Producers: U2; Brian Eno

U2 singles chronology
"Hold Me, Thrill Me, Kiss Me, Kill Me" (1995)	"Miss Sarajevo" (1995)	"Discothèque" (1997)

Music video
- "Miss Sarajevo" on YouTube

"Miss Sarajevo" is a song by Irish rock band U2 and British musician Brian Eno, credited to the pseudonym "Passengers". It was released on 20 November 1995 as the only single from their album Original Soundtracks 1. Italian tenor Luciano Pavarotti makes a vocal appearance, singing the opera solo. The song was written about a group of women who held a beauty pageant during the Siege of Sarajevo as an act of defiance.

"Miss Sarajevo" appears on U2's compilation The Best of 1990–2000 and was covered by George Michael on his album Songs from the Last Century. While the song did not enter the US Billboard Hot 100, it reached number six on the UK Singles Chart and was a top-10 hit in many other European countries. U2 vocalist Bono cites "Miss Sarajevo" as his favourite U2 song.

== Background ==
U2 first became involved with Sarajevo during the Bosnian War, which stemmed from the genocide by Bosnian Serbs against Bosnian Muslims. Once Bosnia and Herzegovina had declared their independence from Yugoslavia, the Serbs from Sarajevo suburbs surrounded the capital, Sarajevo, as they planned to include a territory of the country as part of their new Serbian state of Republika Srpska. It was the longest siege of a capital city in the history of modern warfare, lasting from April 1992 until February 1996. The population of Sarajevo was reduced to poverty, no longer having access to public transit, water, gas and electricity, depending greatly on relief agencies. By October 1992, no-fly zones were established by the United Nations, making it difficult for any media cover or relief plans to be sent into the country.

American journalist Bill Carter travelled to Sarajevo in the winter of 1993 to offer humanitarian aid and quickly found himself in the heart of the conflict. He lived for six months in a burnt-out office building, subsisting on baby food and whatever water he could find in the rivers and sewers and delivering food and medicine to those in need. Carter originally contacted U2 while they were on their Zoo TV Tour to show audiences the real people involved, feeling that the western media were ignoring the human aspect of the war. The band arranged for several satellite link-ups where Carter gave the locals—who had been cut off from communication with the rest of Europe for about a year and a half at this point—an opportunity to be heard before stadiums of thousands. The link-ups were brief and unedited.

The idea was simple, instead of doing what the news does, which is entertain you, I wanted to do something that the news rarely does, make a person care about the issue ... I wanted young people in Europe to see the people in the war, I didn't want them to see politicians or religious leaders or military spokesmen.

— Bill Carter,

Carter suggested to lead vocalist Bono an idea to film a documentary based on Sarajevo's underground resistance movement. Not only did Bono produce the film, he also provided the funds needed to support the project. Carter had his camera sent to him from his home in California so he could film the documentary with the same goal of exposing people to the individuals living through the war. "The war is just a backdrop, it could be any war, the point is the vitality of the human spirit to survive, [to] laugh, to love, and to move on, that is something we will be addressing always."

The camera follows the organizers through the tunnels and cellars of the city, giving a unique insight into life during a modern war, where civilians are the targets. The film captures the dark humour of the besieged Sarajevans, their stubborn refusal to be demoralised and suggests that surrealism and Dadaism are the appropriate responses to fanaticism.

— Bono

Carter's Sarajevo documentary was one of two Dreamchaser nominees for the 1995 International Monitor Awards, in Washington, D.C. Carter would ultimately prevail over a Chernobyl documentary Black Wind, White Land, made by fellow nominee and Bono's wife, Ali Hewson.

== Inspiration and composition ==
In 1995, U2 and producer Brian Eno wrote "Miss Sarajevo" during the recording sessions for their collaborative album Original Soundtracks 1. The lyrics were written in response to "the surreal acts of defiance that had taken place during the siege of Sarajevo". One such act was a beauty pageant organized by Bosnian women who planned to fight the war with their "lipstick and heels". During the pageant, all of the participants walked onto the stage carrying a banner that said, "Don't let them kill us". The winner of the pageant, 17-year-old Inela Nogić, later said the pageant "was a crazy thing to do during a war. But we tried to live a normal life. It was some kind of a defense mechanism we all had." Years later, Bono said, "It was pure Dada and it deserved to be celebrated in song." Of the song's meaning, he said, "Everywhere people had heard their call for help—but help never came. That was the feeling. I had tried to tackle subjects like this head-on, but I'd learnt a lesson. You have to try and make the same points, in a different, less direct, more surrealist way." The lyrics protest the war in Bosnia, criticising the international community for its inability to stop the war or help those affected by it. Bono went on to say that he felt that these lyrics reflected what the people of Sarajevo were feeling at the time. Original Soundtracks 1 is an album of songs based mostly on non-existent films; however, "Miss Sarajevo" is one of four tracks from the album that are based on real films.

Italian tenor Luciano Pavarotti makes a vocal appearance, singing the opera solo. According to Bono, Pavarotti was very fond of the idea of a collaboration. Even before "Miss Sarajevo" was conceived, "He had been asking for a song. In fact, asking is an understatement. He had been crank-calling the house. He told me if I didn't write him a song, God would be very cross." Anna Coleman, wife of Marc Coleman who works closely with the band, wrote the Italian libretto for the track. Roughly translated by Bono, the lyrics read:

You say that like a river finds its way to the sea
You will find your way back to me
You say that you will find a way
But love I'm not a praying man
And in love I can't wait any more.

— Bono

== Music video ==
The music video for this song, directed by Maurice Linnane, is a montage of three different events: the beauty pageant described in the song; the original performance of the song from the Pavarotti & Friends concert in Modena; and a tour through the streets of war-torn Sarajevo under gunfire from the nearby troops taken from Carter's documentary. Clips contain striking imagery, such as a shot of the pageant contestants holding up a banner with the words "Don't let them kill us" in all caps, as seen on the single's artwork. The video is featured on The Best of 1990–2000 DVD with a director's commentary, and a documentary entitled Missing Sarajevo.

Another version of this video exists, featuring only the footage from the Modena concert. A third version of the video shows only the footage from war-torn Sarajevo and the beauty pageant.

== Critical reception ==
Stephen Thomas noted that, while the collaboration seemed like "a step too far" on paper, the end result combined U2's rock with Eno's ambience and Pavarotti's emotion. He wrote that the "overall result is a startling realisation that not only are the two music genres, opera and rock, not mutually incompatible, but that Bono and Pavarotti's very different singing styles and capabilities sit unexpectedly well alongside one another." Music & Media wrote, "The U2 composition 'Miss Sarajevo' is as hypnotic as the beautiful 'One'; Pavarotti's tenor is not intrusive, but a real contribution to the slow build-up of the song."

== Live performances ==
=== Pavarotti & Friends ===
"Miss Sarajevo" was first performed 12 September 1995 at the annual Pavarotti & Friends concert in Modena, Italy. Bono, the Edge, and Eno joined Pavarotti on stage, with a complete orchestra, to premier the new Original Soundtracks 1 future single. All three dressed in black suits and white shirts and this was one of very few occasions where The Edge performed without his famous beanie.

=== Sarajevo PopMart Tour concert ===
The song was played once on U2's 1997 PopMart Tour in Sarajevo with Eno. U2 was the first major act to perform a concert in the city since the end of the war, and the band was very pleased to be present there at the time. As per the Sarajevans' request, the show was not a benefit concert, and the band performed just as they did in any other city on the tour. The actual winner of the Miss Sarajevo pageant, Inela Nogić, was present at that show, and was escorted to the concert with the band themselves. Bono lost his voice during the concert, and unfortunately messed up during the performance of "Miss Sarajevo," and said afterwards, "Sarajevo, this song was written for you. I hope you like it, because we can't fucking play it." In reference to the performance, Larry Mullen, Jr. said, "That [was] an experience I will never forget for the rest of my life. And if I had to spend 20 years in the band just to play that show, and have done that, I think it would have been worthwhile."

=== Vertigo Tour ===
After its only live performance by U2 from 1997, the song was played live many times on the band's Vertigo Tour. On the tour's second leg in Amsterdam, "Miss Sarajevo" was played for the first time during the tour, replacing the usual nightly performance of "Running to Stand Still," and was played each night for the remaining 86 shows in the tour. During the performances, Bono sang opera solo part and The Edge played the song on the piano instead of the guitar. At the end of the performance each night, a video was shown with a woman reciting the Universal Declaration of Human Rights. Versions of performances from the Vertigo Tour concerts in Milan can be found on the album U2.Communication, in the video Vertigo: Live from Milan, and the concert film U2 3D.

=== U2 360° Tour ===
The song returned on the third leg of the band's U2 360° Tour, making its first appearance on the first show for the 2010 leg of the tour, taking place in the Stadio Olimpico di Torino in Torino, Italy. During the performance, which is somewhat similar to the performance on the Vertigo Tour, The Edge plays on the piano and Bono sings the whole song plus the opera solo.

=== The Joshua Tree Tour 2017 ===
The song was played on The Joshua Tree Tour 2017 to note the Syrian refugee crisis. Bono has said that, on this tour, the song has been retitled "Miss Syria".

== Track listing ==
All music is composed by Passengers, except "One" (lyrics by Bono, music by U2).

No.	Title	Artist	Length
1.	"Miss Sarajevo"	Passengers feat. Luciano Pavarotti	5:19
2.	"One" (Live in Modena, Italy, 1995)	U2	5:38
3.	"Bottoms (Watashitachi no Ookina Yume)" (Zoo Station remix)	Passengers	4:11
4.	"Viva Davidoff"	Passengers	4:29

== B-sides ==
The "Miss Sarajevo" single was backed with the following B-Sides:

- "One" – This is a performance from the Pavarotti and Friends concert held in Modena, Italy, featuring Bono, The Edge, Brian Eno and Pavarotti, himself, all performing the song with a full orchestra.
- "Bottoms (Watashitachi no Ookina Yume)" (Zoo Station Remix) – This track is simply an instrumental remixed version of "Zoo Station" from the Achtung Baby album, hence the "Zoo Station Remix" denomination. The Japanese subtitle, "Watashitachi no Ookina Yume," translates to "our big dream." The track was also featured as a bonus track on the Japanese release of Original Soundtracks 1.
- "Viva Davidoff" – This is an Eno-like atmospheric instrumental track, much like the Original Soundtracks 1 song "Theme from The Swan." The song title is an exultation to the Davidoff tobacco company.

== Alternative versions ==
There are six different versions of this song available:

- Studio versions
  - Album version – featured on the Original Soundtracks 1 album
  - Single edit – about 20 seconds shorter; featured on the single and on a compilation album dedicated to Diana, Princess of Wales
  - Radio edit – slightly more than a minute shorter than the album version; featured on the compilation The Best of 1990–2000
- Live versions
  - Pavarotti and Friends – live from the Pavarotti & Friends concert; featured on the album Pavarotti and Friends: Together for the Children of Bosnia
  - Vertigo Tour – live from Milan 20 July 2005 with Bono singing Pavarotti's solo; featured on the "All Because of You" single and on the album U2.Communication
  - Vertigo Tour – live from Milan 21 July 2005, comparable to the version from the day before; featured in the video Vertigo: Live from Milan

== Charts ==
=== Weekly charts ===
Chart (1995–1996)	Peak position
Australia (ARIA)	7
Austria (Ö3 Austria Top 40)	22
Belgium (Ultratop 50 Flanders)	5
Belgium (Ultratop 50 Wallonia)	3
Brazil (UPI)	7
Canada Top Singles (RPM)	46
Canada Adult Contemporary (RPM)	34
Europe (Eurochart Hot 100)	5
Europe (European Hit Radio)	12
Finland (Suomen virallinen lista)	5
France (SNEP)	8
Germany (GfK)	11
Ireland (IRMA)	4
Italy (Musica e dischi)	3
Italy Airplay (Music & Media)	8
Netherlands (Dutch Top 40)	5
Netherlands (Single Top 100)	5
New Zealand (Recorded Music NZ)	23
Norway (VG-lista)	10
Sweden (Sverigetopplistan)	35
Switzerland (Schweizer Hitparade)	10
UK Singles (Official Charts)	6

=== Year-end charts ===
Chart (1995)	Position
Australia (ARIA)	95
France (SNEP)	90
UK Singles (OCC)	88

Chart (1996)	Position
Belgium (Ultratop 50 Flanders)	35
Belgium (Ultratop 50 Wallonia)	31
Germany (Media Control)	91
Netherlands (Dutch Top 40)	47
Netherlands (Single Top 100)	53

== Certifications ==
Region	Certification	Certified units/sales
United Kingdom (BPI)	Silver	200,000^{^}
^{^} Shipments figures based on certification alone.

== Release history ==
Region	Date	Format(s)	Label(s)	Ref(s).
United Kingdom	6 November 1995	Radio airplay	Island	
United States	7 November 1995 (Note: "Miss Sarajevo" was not released as a single in the US but was serviced to all radio formats along with the rest of the album on 7 November 1995.)	Radio airplay	Island	
United Kingdom	20 November 1995	7-inch vinyl; CD; cassette	Island	
Australia	27 November 1995	CD; cassette	Island; Mercury	
Japan	21 December 1995	CD	Island	

== See also ==
- List of covers of U2 songs – Miss Sarajevo
- Inela Nogić
