= Deryk Houston =

Canadian artist

Deryk Houston (born January 7, 1954) is a Canadian artist and the subject of a documentary created by the National Film Board of Canada, titled From Baghdad to Peace Country. In 1999, Houston had a life-altering journey to Baghdad. Unable to remain an outside observer of the crisis in Iraq, he travelled to witness first-hand the impact of international sanctions on the Iraqi people. Compelled to speak out, the artist embarked upon a unique nature art project designed to call attention to the situation of the children of Iraq. Using rocks, gravel and hay, Houston began to create large-scale art installations in the image of a mother and child against diverse landscapes around the world. His earthen-work Peace Sanctuary in Northeastern British Columbia can be seen via Google Maps.

Houston's work, including sculpture and painting, has been exhibited extensively in Canada and internationally and is in the collection of the Canadian War Museum.

Houston has also created artwork used in several publications, including "Echoes from the Square". ISBN 0-921156-99-5.

In 2015, in collaboration with Woodwynn farms, a therapeutic community for the homeless, Houston designed and constructed a one-acre Peace Garden. This incorporated sculptures and an eighty-foot diameter labyrinth filled with over five hundred edible sage and lavender. The idea was to bring the community together and provide a place of peace for everyone.
