= Adam Clayton =

Irish rock musician, bassist of U2 (born 1960)

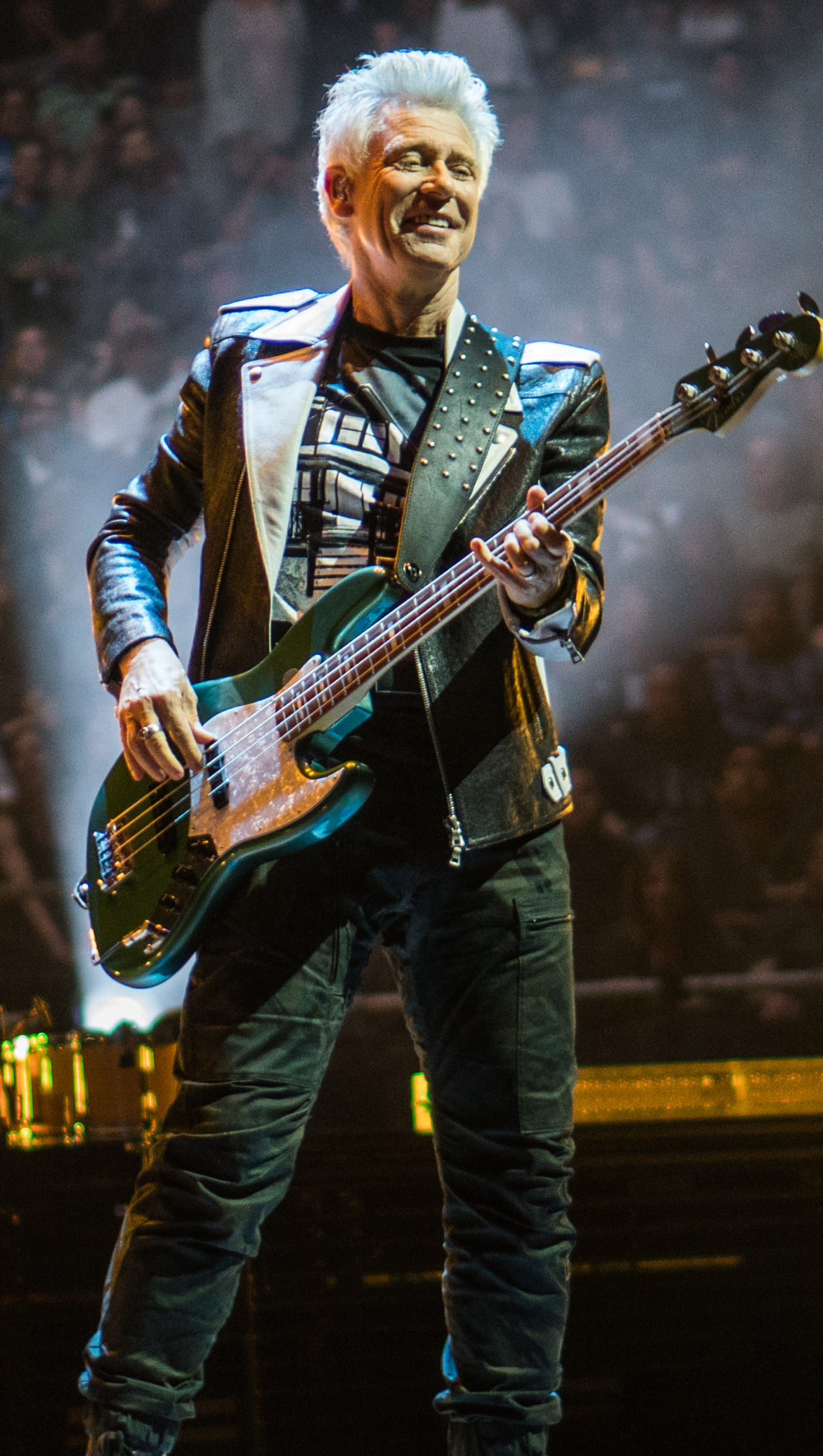
- Clayton performing in 2018

Background information
- Born: Adam Charles Clayton; 13 March 1960 (age 66); Chinnor, Oxfordshire, England
- Origin: Dublin, Ireland
- Genres: Rock; alternative rock; pop rock; post-punk
- Occupations: Musician, songwriter
- Instrument: Bass guitar
- Years active: 1976–present
- Labels: Island; Interscope; Mercury; CBS Ireland
- Member of: U2
- Spouse: Mariana Teixeira de Carvalho (m. 2013; div. 2024)

Adam Charles Clayton (born 13 March 1960) is an English-Irish musician who is the bass guitarist of the rock band U2. Born in Oxfordshire, England, he lived in County Dublin, Ireland after his family moved to Malahide in 1965, when he was five years old. Clayton attended Mount Temple Comprehensive School, where he met schoolmates with whom he co-founded U2 in 1976. A member of the band since its inception, he has recorded 15 studio albums with U2.

Clayton's bass playing style employs "harmonic syncopation", giving the music a driving rhythm. He has worked on several solo projects throughout his career, such as his work with fellow band member Larry Mullen Jr. on the 1996 version of the "Theme from Mission: Impossible". As a member of U2, Clayton has received 22 Grammy Awards and was inducted into the Rock and Roll Hall of Fame in 2005.

== Early life ==
Adam Charles Clayton, the oldest child of Brian and Jo Clayton, was born on 13 March 1960 in Chinnor, Oxfordshire, England. His father was a pilot with the Royal Air Force and later as a commercial pilot for Aer Lingus, and his mother was a former airline stewardess. When Clayton was four years old, his father worked in Kenya as a pilot with East African Airways, with the family residing in Nairobi; Clayton regards this as the happiest period of his childhood. In 1965, the family moved to Malahide, north County Dublin, Ireland, where Clayton's brother Sebastian was born. The Clayton family became friends with the Evans family (including their son David Evans ("The Edge"), who later co-founded the band U2 with Clayton).

When he was eight years old, Clayton was sent to board at Castle Park School in Dalkey in south county Dublin. Not being sports-oriented, Clayton did not enjoy the school or respond well to its ethos; he found it difficult to settle socially there. He was interested in pop music, which students were not allowed to listen to. He joined the School's "Gramphone Society", which met to listen to classical music. He also took piano lessons for a short time. His introduction to the world of popular music was around age 10, listening to rock operas such as Jesus Christ Superstar and Hair, and other material that was midway between classical and popular music.

"Adam was Mrs Burns because he did come over like an old woman sometimes."

— The Edge, on how the Virgin Prunes nicknamed Clayton

At age 13, Clayton attended St Columba's College in Rathfarnham, Dublin. Here he made friends with other pupils who were enthusiastic about the pop/rock music acts of the period, including the Who, the Beatles, Grateful Dead, and Carole King. In response, he bought a £5 acoustic guitar from a junk shop near the Dublin quays, and began learning elementary chords and songs. John Leslie, who shared a room with Clayton at St. Columba's, persuaded him to join in with a school band where Clayton played the bass guitar for the first time. His mother purchased a bass for him when he was 14 when Clayton promised that he would commit himself to learn to play the instrument.

Clayton later moved school to Mount Temple Comprehensive School in Dublin, where he met future U2 bandmates Paul Hewson ("Bono") and Larry Mullen Jr., who were also pupils there, and was reunited with his childhood friend David Evans.

== Musical career ==
=== U2 ===
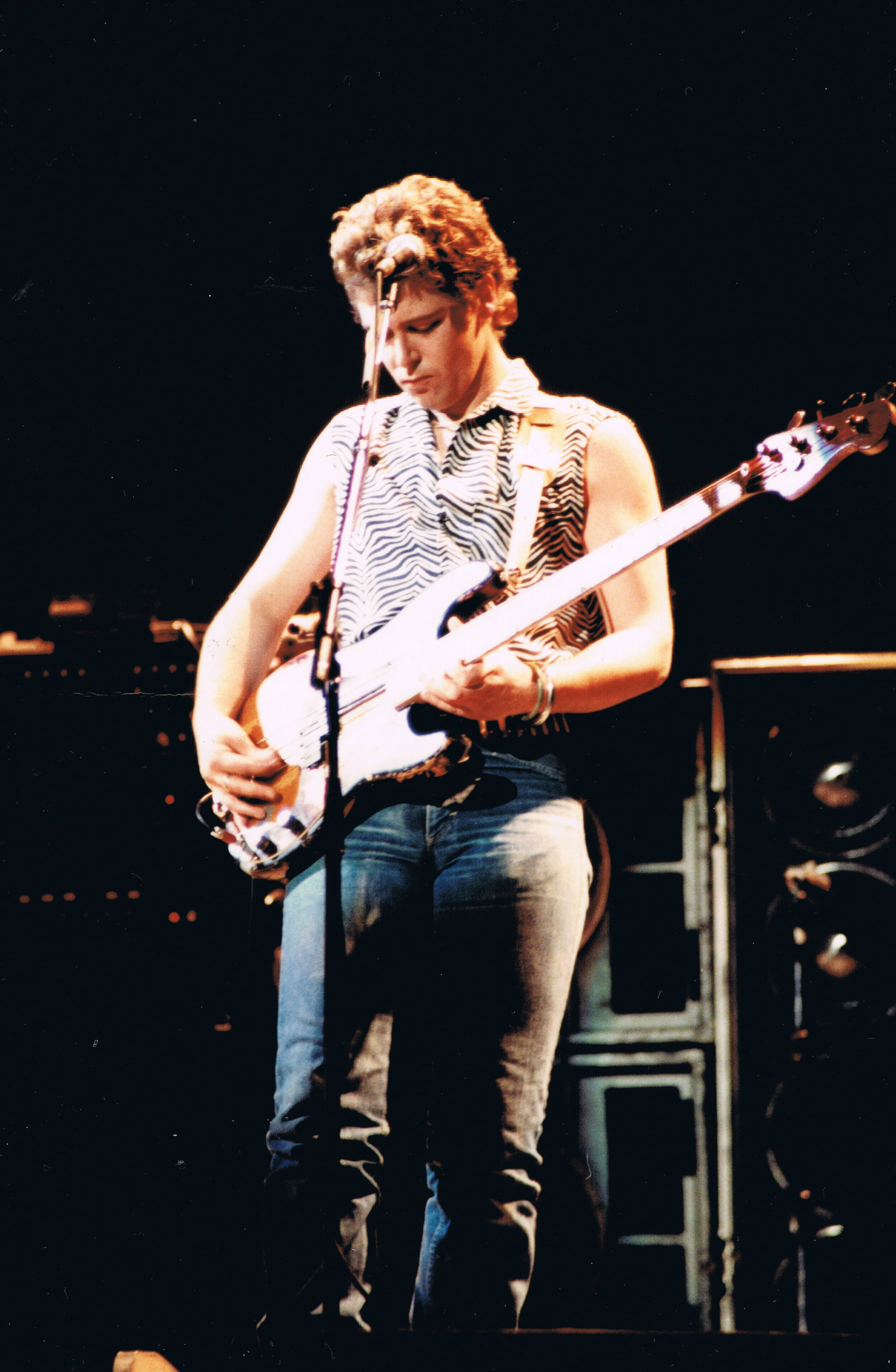
Clayton performing with U2 in September 1984

In September 1976, Mullen put an advert onto the school's bulletin board seeking other musicians to form a band; Clayton showed up for the first meeting and practice, as did the Edge with his older brother Richard Evans ("Dik"), Bono, and Mullen's friends Ivan McCormick and Peter Martin, who both left the band soon after its inception.

While the band was a five-piece (consisting of Bono, the Edge, Mullen, Dik Evans, and Clayton) it was known as "Feedback". The name was subsequently changed to "The Hype", but changed to "U2" soon after Dik Evans left. Clayton stood in as the nearest thing that the band had to a manager in its early life, handing over the duties to Paul McGuinness in May 1978. In 1981, around the time of U2's second, spiritually charged album, October, a rift occurred between Clayton and McGuinness, and the three other band members. Bono, The Edge, and Mullen had joined a Christian group, and were questioning the compatibility of rock music with their spirituality. However, Clayton, with his more ambiguous religious views, was less concerned, and so was more of an outsider.

In 1995, after the Zoo TV Tour and Zooropa album, Clayton went to New York with bandmate Mullen to receive formal training in the bass; until then, Clayton had been entirely self-taught. During that period, Clayton worked on U2's experimental album, released under the pseudonym "Passengers", entitled Original Soundtracks 1. That album features one of the few instances where Clayton has appeared as a vocalist; he spoke the last verse of "Your Blue Room", the album's second single. Prior to this Clayton had only provided live backing vocals to tracks such as "Out of Control", "I Will Follow", "Twilight", and "Bullet the Blue Sky". Since the 1997 PopMart Tour, Clayton has not sung live in any capacity for the band.

=== Other projects ===
Clayton has worked on several side projects throughout his career. He played (along with the other members of U2) on Robbie Robertson's self-titled album from 1987, and has also performed with Maria McKee. Clayton joined U2 producer Daniel Lanois and bandmate Larry Mullen Jr. on Lanois's 1989 album Acadie, playing the bass on the songs "Still Water" and "Jolie Louise". Clayton played on Sharon Shannon's song "The Marguerita Suite" from her self-titled debut album, which was released in October 1991. In 1994, Clayton played bass alongside Mullen on Nanci Griffith's album Flyer, appearing on the songs "These Days in an Open Book", "Don't Forget About Me", "On Grafton Street" and "This Heart".

Clayton and Mullen contributed to the soundtrack of the 1996 film Mission: Impossible, which included reworking the "Theme from Mission: Impossible", whose time signature was changed from the original 5/4 time signature to an easier and more danceable 4/4 time signature. The song reached number 7 on the U.S. Billboard Hot 100, and was nominated for the Grammy Award for Best Pop Instrumental Performance in 1997. Clayton was also featured on Steven Van Zandt's 1999 album Born Again Savage.

== Musical style ==
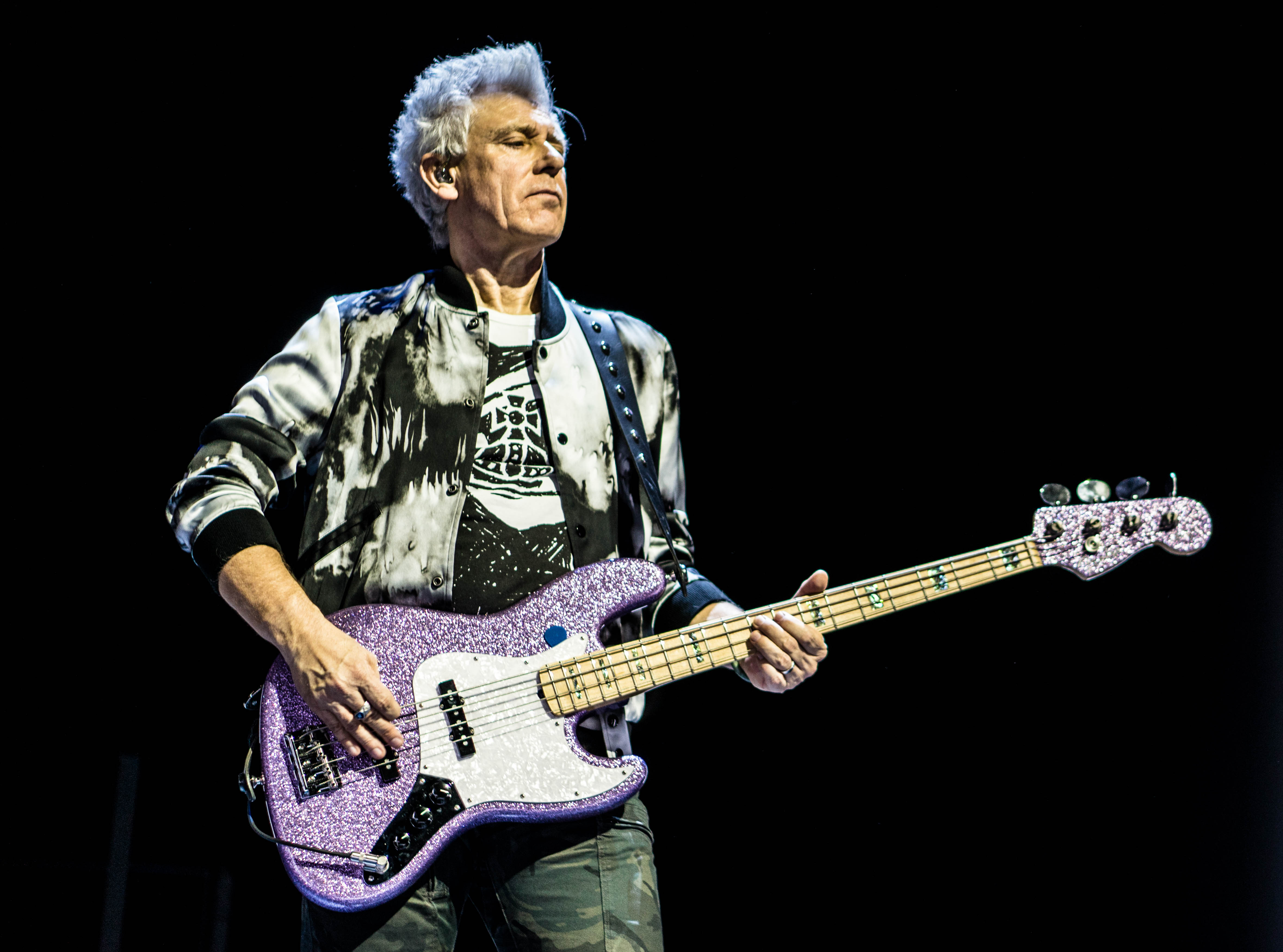
Clayton in October 2018

Clayton's style of bass guitar playing is noted for what instructor Patrick Pfeiffer called "harmonic syncopation". With this technique, Clayton plays a consistent rhythm that stresses the eighth note of each bar, but he "anticipates the harmony by shifting the tonality" before the guitar chords do. This gives the music a feeling of "forward motion". Initially, Clayton had no formal musical training; Bono said of Clayton's early bass playing, "Adam used to pretend he could play bass. He came round and started using words like 'action' and 'fret' and he had us baffled. He had the only amplifier, so we never argued with him. We thought this guy must be a musician; he knows what he's talking about. And then one day, we discovered he wasn't playing the right notes. That's what's wrong, y'know?" In the band's early years, Clayton generally played simple bass parts in 4/4 time consisting of steady eighth notes emphasising the roots of chords. Over time, he incorporated influences from Motown and reggae into his playing style, and as he became a better timekeeper, his playing became more melodic. Author Bill Flanagan said that he "often plays with the swollen, vibrating bottom sound of a Jamaican dub bassist, covering the most sonic space with the smallest number of notes". Flanagan said that Clayton's playing style perfectly reflected his personality: "Adam plays a little behind the beat, waiting till the last moment to slip in, which fits Adam's casual, don't-sweat-it personality."

Clayton relies on his own instincts when developing basslines, deciding whether to follow the chord progressions of the guitars or play a counter-melody, and when to play an octave higher or lower. He cites bassists such as Paul Simonon, Bruce Foxton, Peter Hook, Jean-Jacques Burnel, and James Jamerson as major influences on him. He credits Jacques Burnel for his choice of instrument, saying that upon hearing his bass guitar playing in the Stranglers' song "Hanging Around", Clayton "immediately [knew] it was going to be the instrument for [him]". Describing his role in U2's rhythm section with drummer Larry Mullen Jr., Clayton said, "Larry's drums have always told me what to play, and then the chords tell me where to go". One of Clayton's most recognisable basslines is from "New Year's Day", which was borne out of an attempt to play Visage's song "Fade to Grey".

Clayton has sung on some occasions, including on the song "Endless Deep", the B-side to the single "Two Hearts Beat as One" from 1983. Clayton also sang backup vocals on "I Will Follow", "Twilight", "Trip Through Your Wires" and also on some occasions on "With or Without You" and "Bullet the Blue Sky" during live performances. He also spoke the last verse of "Your Blue Room". Clayton can be heard speaking on "Tomorrow ('96 Version)" (a rerecording of "Tomorrow" that he arranged) a song from U2's 1981 album October. He plays the guitar on a few occasions, most notably the song "40", where he and guitarist the Edge switch instruments. He also plays the keyboards on "City of Blinding Lights" and "Iris (Hold Me Close)".

== Musical equipment ==
"So there I was, fifteen years old, with a dark brown Ibanez-copy bass guitar and no amp. I had no idea what I was supposed to do with it. Absolutely none. Not a clue. It just sounded good to me. Deep and fat and satisfying."

— Adam Clayton

Clayton's first bass was a walnut brown Ibanez Musician, which he played heavily from the recording of Boy and well through the War era. Two years later, at 16, Clayton asked his father Brian to purchase a second-hand Precision for him when Brian travelled to New York, as he felt he needed a better guitar to master the instrument. For the rest of his career, he has mainly been known for using various Fender Precision and Jazz basses. Clayton's Precision basses have been modified with a Fender Jazz neck. In an interview with Bass Player magazine, he said that he prefers the Jazz bass neck because it is more "lady-like" and is a better fit in his left hand.

In 2011, the Fender Custom Shop produced a limited-edition signature Precision Bass built to Clayton's own specifications in a limited run of 60 pieces, featuring an alder body and a gold sparkle finish. In 2014, Fender announced a signature Adam Clayton Jazz Bass guitar, modelled after a Sherwood Green 1965 Jazz Bass he played during the 2001 Elevation Tour. In 2023, Fender unveiled a signature model of bass guitar amplifier designed in collaboration with Clayton, the ACB 50. It is a 50-watt, all-tube combo amplifier that emphasises mid-range distortion.

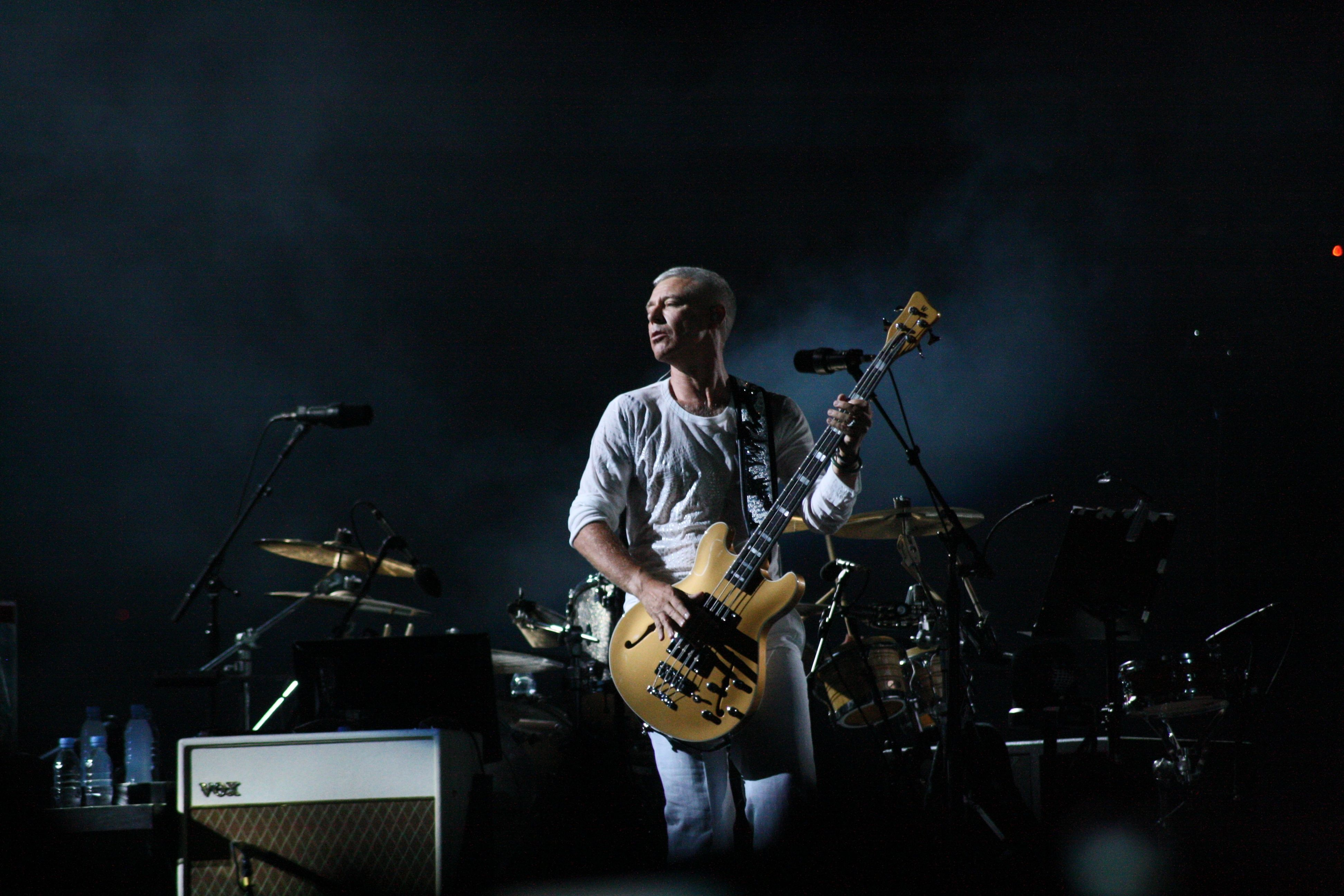
Clayton with Warwick Star Bass in 2010

== Personal life ==
Clayton served as the best man at Bono's wedding to Alison Hewson (née Stewart) in 1982. He became a naturalised citizen of Ireland in 1989, whilst also retaining his British citizenship.

"Life was pretty chaotic. I don't really like that kind of intensity, I don't like that sort of activity, so whilst I was able to go along with it, I wasn't really in control, it would be fair to say. Every night was a party, but I don't think I felt much contentment or peace, that's for sure. I'd be fine during the day, I'd be fine for the gig but afterwards it was too easy to go out all night or just keep drinking in your room. I was beginning to realize that every time I drank, I couldn't really be sure of the result. And it always made the next day worse. So I decided to lay off and stop drinking during the final leg of the tour."

— Adam Clayton regarding his alcoholism

Clayton made the news in August 1989 when he was arrested at The Blue Light pub in the Dublin Mountains for carrying a small amount of marijuana. However, he avoided conviction by making a large donation to a charity, and later commented: "it was my own fault. And I'm sure I was out of my head – emotionally apart from anything else. But it is serious because it is illegal." Clayton has also had alcohol problems, which came to a head during the Zoo TV Tour. On 26 November 1993, he was so hung over that he was unable to play that night's show in Sydney, the dress rehearsal for their Zoo TV concert film. Bass duties had to be fulfilled by Clayton's technician Stuart Morgan. After that incident, he resolved to give up alcohol, eventually beginning his sobriety in 1996. On 26 June 2017, Clayton received the Stevie Ray Vaughan Award at the MusiCares 13th annual MAP Fund Benefit Concert in recognition of his commitment to helping others with addiction recovery.

Clayton remained a bachelor for several decades until his marriage in 2013. During the early 1990s, he dated English supermodel Naomi Campbell. He also had a long-standing relationship with Suzanne "Susie" Smith, a former assistant to Paul McGuinness; they were engaged in 2006, but the pair broke up in February 2007. In 2010, Clayton fathered a son with his then-partner, a French woman whose name has not been publicised. In 2013, he confirmed that he was no longer in that relationship. On 4 September 2013, Clayton married former human rights lawyer Mariana Teixeira de Carvalho in a ceremony in Dublin. The Independent reported in 2015 that de Carvalho, originally from Brazil, works as a director at Michael Werner, a leading contemporary art gallery in London and New York. On 25 July 2017, Clayton and his wife announced the birth of a daughter. In 2024, the couple announced their divorce.

In 2009 the High Court ordered the assets of Carol Hawkins, Clayton's former housekeeper and personal assistant, be frozen after it was reported that she misappropriated funds of €1.8 million. At the subsequent trial that figure was stated to be €2.8 million. Hawkins denied the charges but in 2012 was convicted by a jury of 181 counts of theft and sentenced to seven years imprisonment.

In April 2024, Clayton was featured in an episode of BBC's Gardeners' World, showing his collection of camellia, magnolia and rhododendron at his Dublin home, to interviewer Adam Frost. Clayton will also be a presenter on the television programme Ballroom Blitz, which was commissioned by RTÉ and will explore the history of Irish showbands.

== Charity work ==
In 2011 Clayton became an ambassador for the Dublin-based St Patrick's Hospital's Mental Health Service "Walk in My Shoes" facility.

== Awards and recognition ==
Clayton and U2 have won, among many other honours, 22 Grammy Awards, including Best Rock Duo or Group seven times, Album of the Year twice, Record of the Year twice, Song of the Year twice, and Best Rock Album twice. In March 2005, Clayton was inducted into the Rock and Roll Hall of Fame as a member of U2, in their first year of eligibility.

== See also ==
- List of bass guitarists
- Timeline of U2
- U2 discography
