= Larry Mullen Jr. =

Irish rock musician, drummer of U2

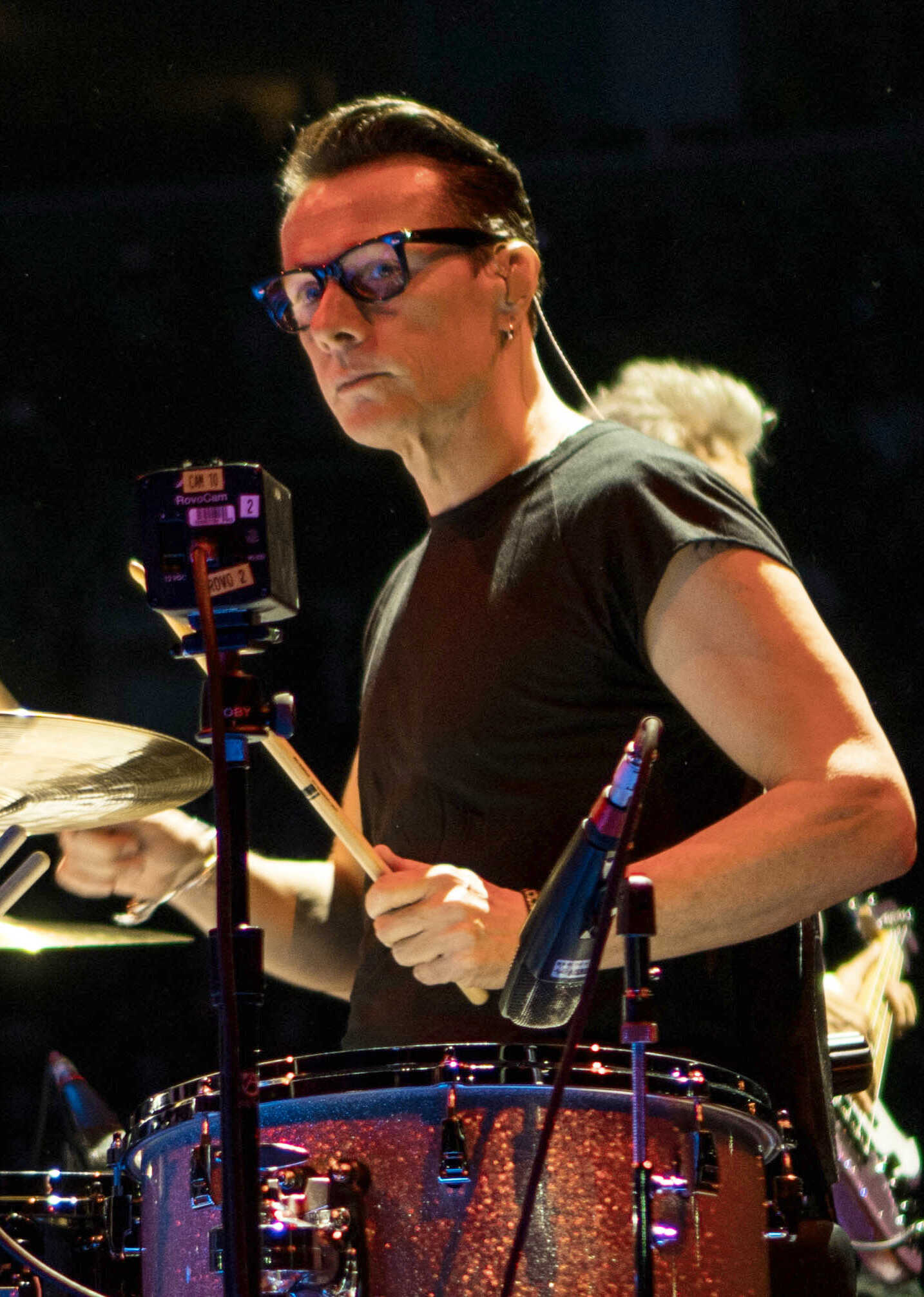
- Mullen in 2018

Background information
- Born: Laurence Joseph Mullen Jr. 31 October 1961 (age 65); Artane, Dublin, Ireland
- Origin: Dublin, Ireland
- Genres: Rock; alternative rock; pop rock; post-punk
- Occupations: Musician; songwriter
- Instruments: Drums; percussion
- Years active: 1976–present
- Labels: Island; Interscope; Mercury; CBS Ireland
- Member of: U2

Laurence Joseph Mullen Jr. (/ˈmʌlən/; born 31 October 1961) is an Irish musician, best known as the drummer and co-founder of the rock band U2. A member of the band since its inception, he has recorded 15 studio albums with U2. Mullen's distinctive, almost military drumming style developed from his playing martial beats in childhood marching bands.

Mullen was born in Dublin, where he attended Mount Temple Comprehensive School. In 1976, he co-founded U2 after posting a message on the school's notice board in search of musicians. Mullen has worked on numerous side projects during his career. In 1990, he produced the Ireland national football team's song "Put 'Em Under Pressure" for the 1990 FIFA World Cup. In 1996, he worked with U2 bandmate Adam Clayton on a dance re-recording of the "Theme from Mission: Impossible". He has also collaborated with musicians such as Maria McKee, Nanci Griffith, Emmylou Harris, and Alice Cooper. Mullen has sporadically acted in films, most notably in Man on the Train (2011) and A Thousand Times Good Night (2013).

Mullen has received 22 Grammy Awards and has been inducted into the Rock and Roll Hall of Fame. In 2016, Rolling Stone ranked Mullen the 96th-greatest drummer of all time.

== Early life ==
Laurence Joseph Mullen Jr., the middle child and only son of Laurence Joseph Mullen Sr. and Maureen (née Boyd) Mullen, was born on 31 October 1961 in Artane, Dublin, Ireland, and lived there, on Rosemount Avenue, until his twenties. His father was a civil servant and his mother a homemaker. He has an elder sister, Cecilia, and had a younger sister, Mary, who died in 1973. He attended the School of Music in Chatham Row to learn piano at the age of eight and then began drumming in 1971 at the age of 9, under the instruction of Irish drummer Joe Bonnie. After Bonnie's death, his daughter Monica took over for him, but Mullen gave up the lessons and started playing by himself.

Before founding U2, Mullen joined a Dublin marching band called the Artane Boys Band at the suggestion of his father. Mullen said that the band focused more on learning to read sheet music, whereas he wanted to spend more time playing the drums. He was asked by the band to cut his shoulder-length hair, and despite acquiescing and cutting a few inches off, he was asked to shorten it further. Mullen refused and quit the band after just three weeks.

Mullen used the money he had saved and with his father's help bought a drum kit, made by a Japanese toy company, which his sister Cecilia's friend was selling. He set up the kit in his bedroom and his parents allotted him certain times to practice. His father then got him into the Post Office Workers Band, which played orchestral melodies with percussion, along with marching band standards. Mullen spent approximately two years in the Post Office Workers Band, overlapping with his time in U2. He attended Scoil Colmcille, Marlborough Street, Dublin. He took the exams for Chanel College and St. Paul's, two Catholic schools his father wanted his son to attend. After the accidental death of Larry's younger sister in 1973, his father gave up the idea of pushing his son into those schools and sent Larry to Mount Temple Comprehensive School, the first interdenominational school in Ireland. His mother died in a car accident in November 1978.

== Musical career ==
=== U2 ===
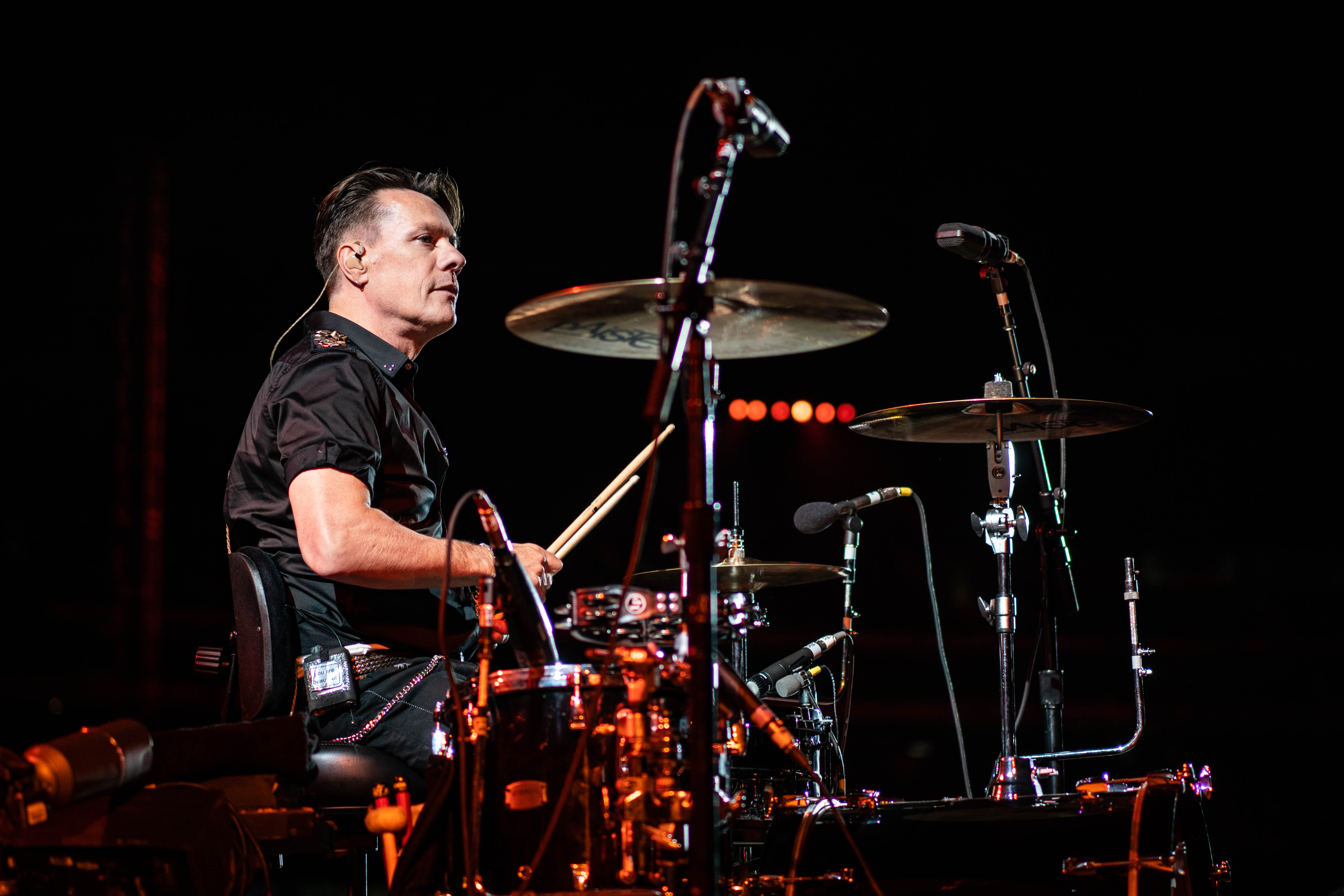
Mullen performing in Melbourne on the Joshua Tree Tour 2019

Mullen's father suggested that he place a notice on the Mount Temple bulletin board, saying something to the effect of "drummer seeks musicians to form band". U2 was founded on 25 September 1976 in Mullen's kitchen in Artane. Attending the first meeting were Mullen, Paul "Bono" Hewson, David "The Edge" Evans and his brother Dik, Adam Clayton, and Mullen's friends Ivan McCormick and Peter Martin. Mullen later described it as "'The Larry Mullen Band' for about ten minutes, then Bono walked in and blew any chance I had of being in charge." McCormick and Martin soon left, and the group settled on the name "Feedback" because it was one of the few technical terms they knew. The band later changed their name to "The Hype", and again to "U2" for a 1978 talent contest in Limerick, Ireland, that they entered and won as a four-piece. Days after the competition, the band's reduction to a four-piece lineup became permanent after they parted ways with Dik.

During the recording of the album Pop in 1996, Mullen suffered from severe back problems. Recording was delayed due to surgery. When he left the hospital, he arrived back in the studio to find the rest of the band experimenting more than ever with electronic drum machines, something driven largely by the Edge's interest in dance and hip-hop music, and, given his weakness after the operation, he relented, allowing The Edge to continue using drum machines, which contributed heavily to the album's electronic feel.

In order to recuperate from neck surgery, Mullen did not perform during U2's concert residency U2:UV Achtung Baby Live at Sphere, which ran for 40 shows from September 2023 to March 2024 at Sphere in the Las Vegas Valley. Dutch drummer Bram van den Berg from the band Krezip filled in for him. It was the first time that Mullen missed a U2 show since 1978, when he broke his foot in a motorcycle accident.

=== Other projects ===
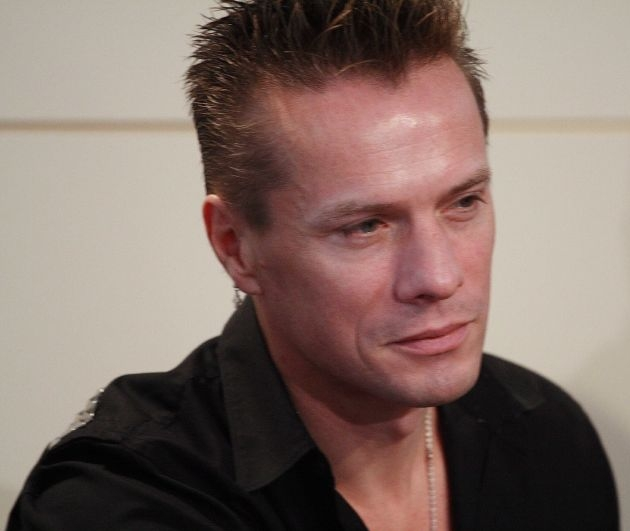
Mullen in 2006

Mullen has worked on many musical projects outside of U2 in his career, including collaborations with Maria McKee. Mullen contributed to U2 producer Daniel Lanois's 1989 album Acadie. In 1990, Mullen co-wrote and arranged an official Ireland national team song "Put 'Em Under Pressure" for the FIFA World Cup. He and Clayton collaborated with Mike Mills and Michael Stipe from R.E.M. to form the one-performance group Automatic Baby, solely for the purpose of performing "One" for MTV's 1993 inauguration ball for US President Bill Clinton; the group's name refers to the titles of both latest bands' albums at the time, Achtung Baby and Automatic for the People. For Nanci Griffith's 1994 album Flyer, he and Clayton performed in the rhythm section on several songs, while Mullen also mixed three songs. Mullen played drums on many of the songs on Emmylou Harris' 1995 album Wrecking Ball.

Mullen and Clayton contributed to the soundtrack of the 1996 film Mission: Impossible, which included reworking the "Theme from Mission: Impossible", whose time signature was changed from the original 5/4 time signature to an easier and more danceable 4/4 time signature. The song reached number 8 on the U.S. Billboard Hot 100, and was nominated for the Grammy Award for Best Pop Instrumental Performance in 1997.

Mullen performed on Underworld's song "Boy, Boy, Boy" from their 2007 album, Oblivion with Bells. In 2017, he appeared on Alice Cooper's album Paranormal.

Mullen has played synthesiser or keyboards on several songs, including "United Colours" from Passengers' 1995 album Original Soundtracks 1, an album that Mullen has always disliked.

== Musical style and techniques ==
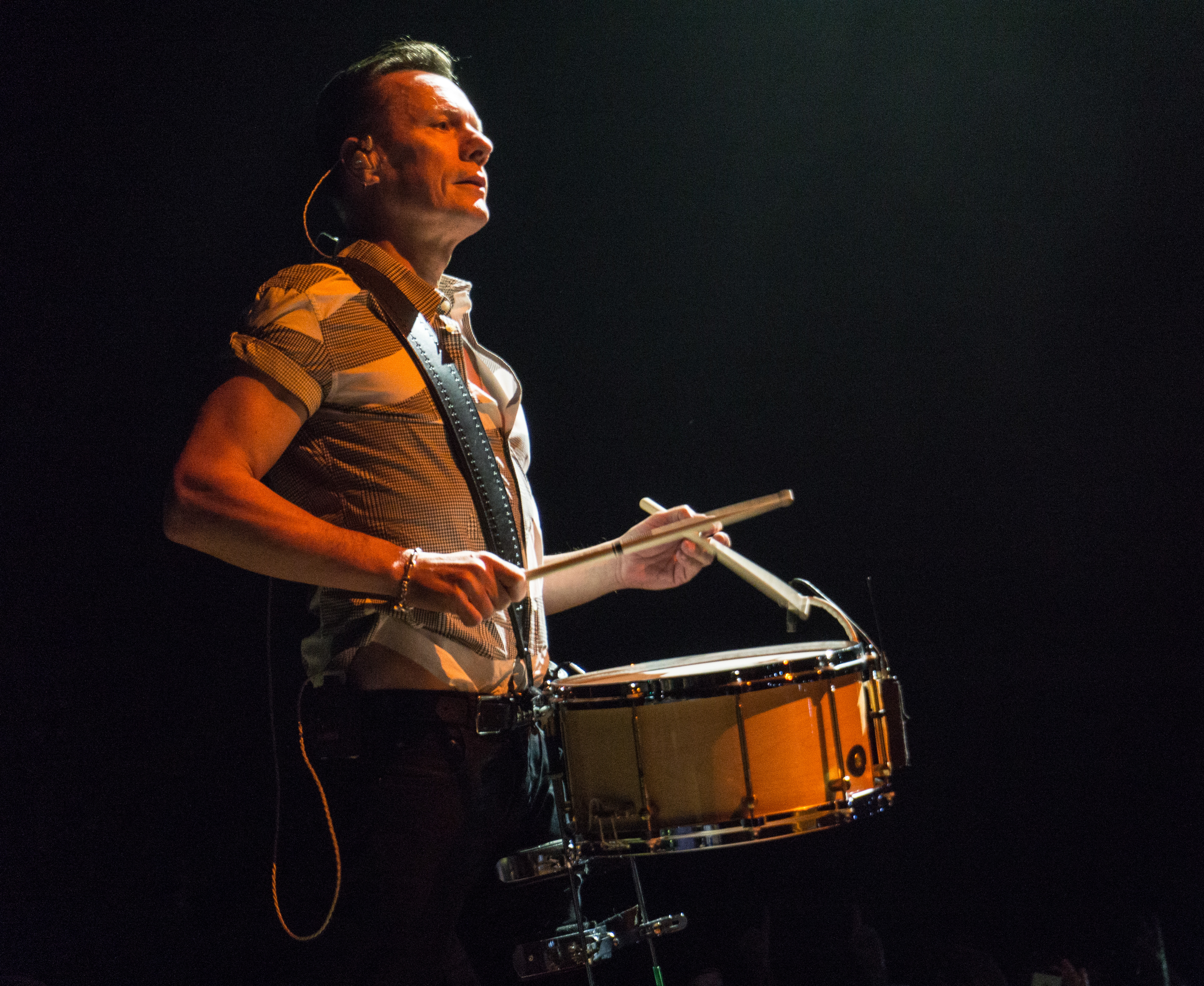
Mullen's martial drumming style was influenced by his experience in marching bands as an adolescent, during which he focused on the snare drum.

Mullen's drumming style is influenced by his experience in marching bands during his adolescence, which helped contribute to the militaristic beats of songs such as "Sunday Bloody Sunday". Author Bill Flanagan said that he plays "with a martial rigidity but uses his kit in a way a properly trained drummer would not"; he tends to transition from the snare drum onto tom-toms positioned on either side of him, contrasting with how they are traditionally used. Mullen occasionally rides a tom-tom the way other drummers would play a cymbal, or rides the hi-hat how others would play a snare. He admitted his bass drum technique is not a strength, as he mostly played the snare in marching bands and did not learn to properly combine the separate elements together on a full kit. As a result, he uses a floor tom to his left to create the effect of a bass drum, an arrangement he began to use while recording "Pride (In the Name of Love)" in 1984 at the influence of producer Daniel Lanois. He said, "I couldn't do what most people would consider a normal beat for the song, so I chose alternatives." Flanagan said that his playing style perfectly reflects his personality: "Larry is right on top of the beat, a bit ahead—as you'd expect from a man who's so ordered and punctual in his life.

Mullen was heavily influenced by glam rock acts of the 1970s when first learning to play drums. In the early days of U2, he had what Bono called a "florid" drumming style, before he eventually adopted a philosophy of simplicity and pared down his rhythms. His drumming leaves open space, owing to what Modern Drummer described as his understanding of "when to hit and when not to hit". As he matured as a timekeeper, he developed a preternatural sense of rhythm; Eno recounted one occasion when Mullen noticed that his click track had been set incorrectly by just six milliseconds. Under the tutelage of Lanois, Mullen learned more about his musical role as the drummer in filling out the band's sound, while producer Flood helped Mullen learn to play along with electronic elements such as drum machines and samples. His kit has a tambourine mounted on a cymbal stand, which he uses as an accent on certain beats for songs such as "With or Without You".

People say, 'Why don't you do interviews? What do you think about this? What do you think about that?' My job in the band is to play drums, to get up on stage and hold the band together. That's what I do. At the end of the day that's all that's important. Everything else is irrelevant.

— Larry Mullen Jr.

Mullen has had tendinitis problems throughout his career. As a means to reduce inflammation and pain, he began to use specially designed Pro-Mark drumsticks. He uses Yamaha drums and Paiste cymbals. Although he occasionally plays keyboards and synthesiser in concerts, Mullen rarely sings during performances. He contributed backing vocals to the songs "Numb", "Get On Your Boots", "Moment of Surrender", "Elevation", "Miracle Drug", "Love and Peace or Else", "Unknown Caller", "Zoo Station" and "Daddy's Gonna Pay for Your Crashed Car" (only during Zoo TV Tour), and others. He occasionally performed a cover version of "Dirty Old Town" on the Zoo TV Tour. During live performances of "I'll Go Crazy If I Don't Go Crazy Tonight" on the U2 360° Tour, Mullen walked around the stage, playing a large djembe strapped around his waist.

== Film projects ==
Mullen's film debut was in a film by Phil Joanou called Entropy where he played himself alongside bandmate Bono. He played a thief in Man on the Train (2011), which starred Donald Sutherland. Mullen also appeared in A Thousand Times Goodnight (2013), starring Juliette Binoche. On 3 September 2013, the film won Special Grand Prix of the Jury at Montreal World Film Festival.

In July 2020, Mullen was invited to join the Academy of Motion Pictures Arts and Sciences.

Mullen co-produced the 2024 documentary film Left Behind, which covers efforts by mothers to open the first public school in New York City for dyslexic children. Mullen, whose son is dyslexic, also contributed two songs to the project: "Between the Lines", co-written by Reed Berin, David Baron, and Gayle; and "One of Us", co-written by Baron and sung by Donna Lewis.

== Personal life ==
We all have views on what our Irishness means to us. Two members of the band were born in England and were raised in the Protestant faith. Bono's mother was Protestant and his father was Catholic. I was brought up Catholic. U2 are a living example of the kind of unity of faith and tradition that is possible in Northern Ireland.

— Larry Mullen Jr.

Mullen met his partner, Ann Acheson, in their first year at Mount Temple Comprehensive School. The two have been together for over 40 years and they have three children. He is a first cousin of Irish actor Conor Mullen.

Mullen was in a motorcycle accident in 1978.

As U2 became increasingly successful, Mullen had to add the suffix "Junior" to his surname to avoid confusion with his father, who was receiving large tax bills meant for his son. Mullen and Clayton own houses near Bono and the Edge in Southern France to make it easier to record with U2 in the area.

Mullen has tendinitis. In 1995, he had surgery on his back to address an injury he had been carrying since The Joshua Tree Tour. In 2009, Mullen underwent knee surgery, an operation that was performed by Richard Steadman. Mullen subsequently joined the board of directors for his foundation, the Steadman Philippon Research Institute.

Mullen has a congenital fusion in a facet joint in his neck, which causes him pain and has been aggravated from drumming over the course of his career. The condition forced him to miss U2's 2023−2024 Sphere residency; Mullen underwent neck surgery in 2023.

In December 2024, Mullen revealed that he has dyscalculia, affecting his ability to add and count numbers. He compared counting musical bars to "climbing Everest" and said that it is the reason for his pained expression while performing.

== Musical equipment ==
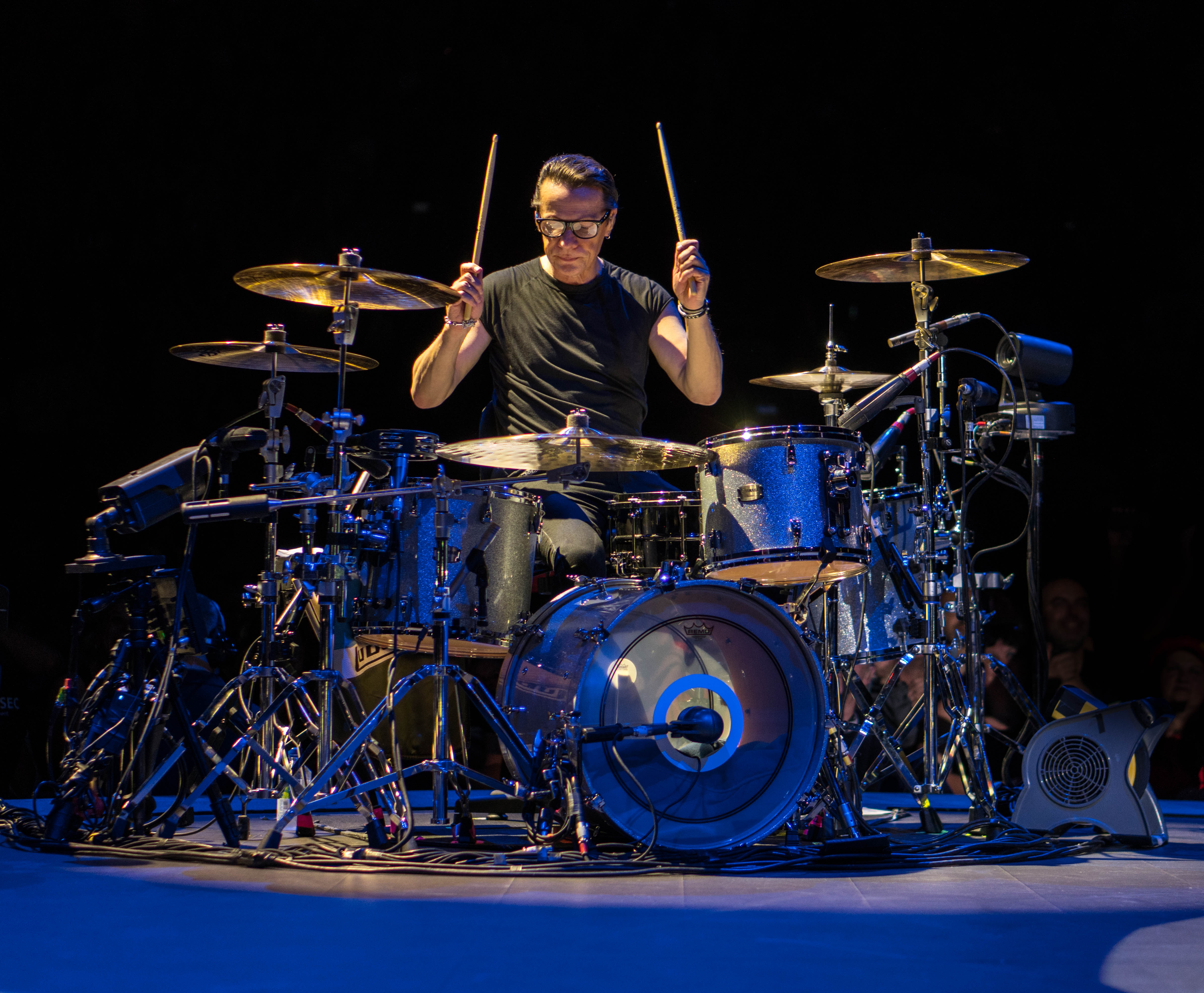
Mullen performing in Manchester in 2018

- Paiste Signature cymbals:
  - 16" power crash
  - 17" power crash
  - 18" power crash
  - 18" full crash
  - 22" power ride
  - 14" heavy hi-hat/sound-edge hi-hat.
- Yamaha Phoenix (PHX) in Silver Sparkles: (Since the U2360 tour. Previously he used Yamaha's Maple Custom and Beech Custom drums in the same sizes).
- On the video of Get On Your Boots, Larry uses a Yamaha Oak Custom, with the same sizes as the Birch Custom
  - 12" × 9" rack tom
  - 16" × 16" floor toms and 16" × 14" (one left of the hi-hat, one right of the snare drum for the Vertigo tour). For previous tours, he used an 18" × 16" floor tom to the left of the hats.
  - 14" × 6.5" Ludwig Black Beauty (Since 360 Tour)
  - 14" x 6.5" Ludwig Black Magic (Since Innocence Experience tour) backup snare
  - 14" × 7" Brady Sheoak Block — primary snare drum on the Vertigo tour. For ZooTV and Elevation tours, he used a 12" × 7" Sheoak block snare. For Popmart, a 14" × 6.5" Jarrah block primarily. Depending on the gig, he sometimes used a 14" × 6.5" Jarrah ply snare instead of the block snare.
  - 24" × 16" kick drum. 22" × 16" Kick on the b-stage during Zoo TV only.
  - Pro-mark 5A Wood tip drumsticks.
  - Remo drumheads
  - Latin Percussion and Toca percussion
  - DW 5000 kick drum pedal
  - DW 9000 hi hat stand

== Awards and recognition ==
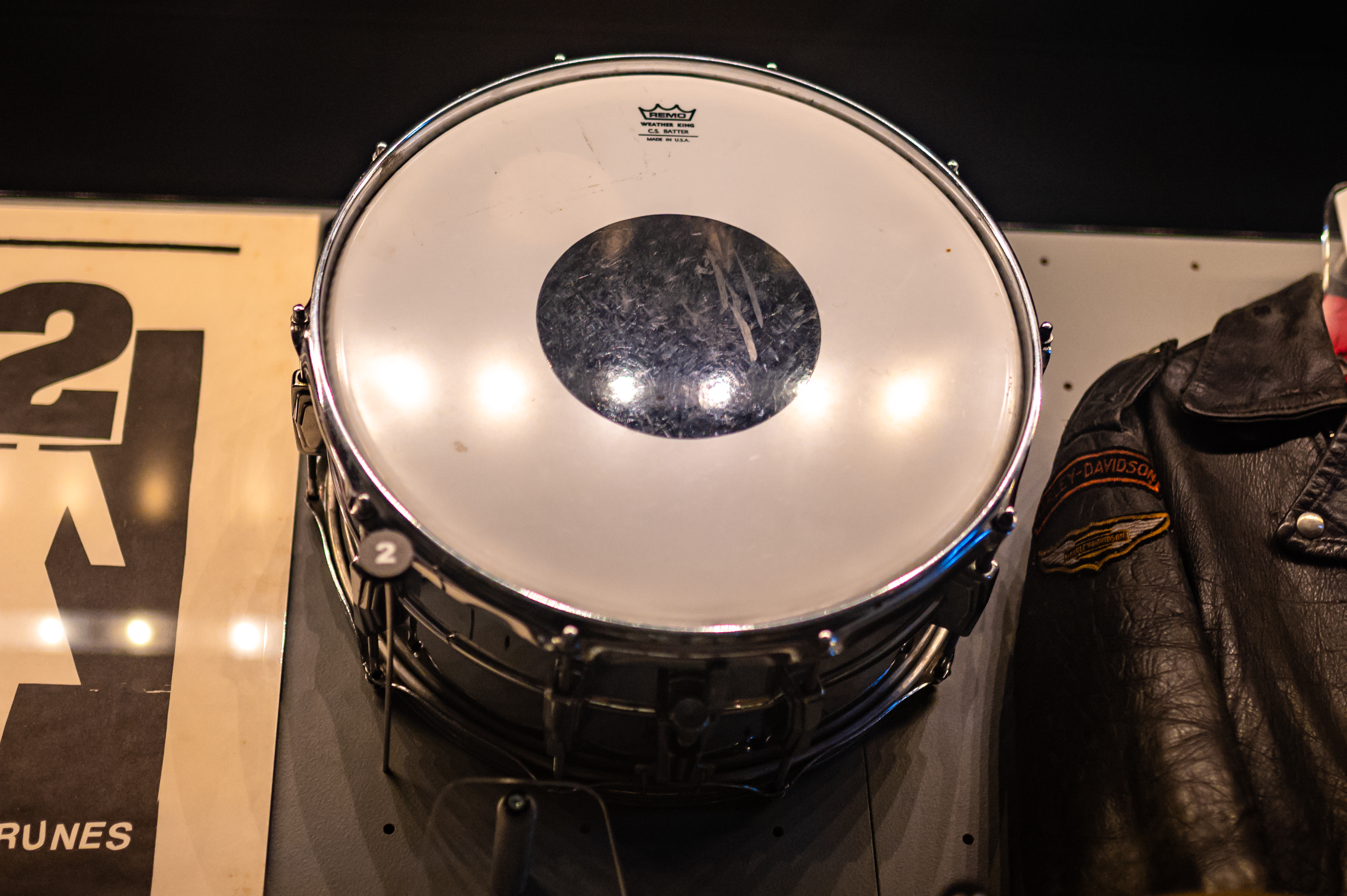
Mullen's snare drum, on display in the Rock and Roll Hall of Fame

Mullen and U2 have won more than 60 awards, including 22 Grammy Awards. At the Grammy Awards, the band has won Best Rock Duo or Group with Vocal seven times, Album of the Year twice, Record of the Year twice, Song of the Year twice, and Best Rock Album twice. In March 2005, Mullen was inducted into the Rock and Roll Hall of Fame as a member of U2, in their first year of eligibility. In 2016, Rolling Stone ranked Mullen the 96th-greatest drummer of all time. He was placed at number 21 on Stylus Magazine's list of the 50 Greatest Rock Drummers. In 2017, Yamaha honoured Mullen with an award for Lifetime Achievement in Musical Excellence.

== See also ==
- List of drummers
- List of people on the postage stamps of Ireland
- Timeline of U2

== Bibliography ==
- Flanagan, Bill (1995). U2 at the End of the World. New York: Delacorte Press. ISBN 978-0-385-31154-0.
- McGee, Matt (2008). U2: A Diary. London: Omnibus Press. ISBN 978-1-84772-108-2.
- U2 (2006). McCormick, Neil (ed.). U2 by U2. London: HarperCollins. ISBN 0-00-719668-7.
