= Vertigo 2005: Live from Chicago =

2005 concert video by U2

Video by U2
- Released: 14 November 2005
- Recorded: 9–10 May 2005
- Venues: United Center (Chicago, Illinois)
- Genre: Rock
- Length: 139 minutes
- Labels: Island; Interscope
- Director: Hamish Hamilton
- Producer: Ned O'Hanlon

U2 chronology
U2.Communication (2005)	Vertigo 2005: Live from Chicago (2005)	Zoo TV Live (2006)

Vertigo 2005: Live from Chicago (sometimes titled Vertigo '05: Live from Chicago) is a concert film by Irish rock band U2. It was filmed from 9–10 May 2005 at the United Center in Chicago, Illinois, during the band's Vertigo Tour. The film was released on DVD later that year on 14 November through Island Records in most parts of the world, and on 15 November through Interscope Records in the United States. The DVD was released as a one-disc standard edition and a deluxe edition with a second disc featuring bonus material and a documentary. It was the first of three concert films from the tour.

The video was a worldwide success, topping the music DVD charts in 11 countries. It has been certified diamond in Brazil and France; sextuple-platinum in Australia; triple-platinum in New Zealand, Portugal, and Spain; and double-platinum in Mexico and the United Kingdom. As of January 2007, it was the band's best-selling DVD, according to Nielsen SoundScan, selling over 285,000 copies in the United States.

== Background and recording ==
U2 embarked on the Vertigo Tour in March 2005 to support their studio album How to Dismantle an Atomic Bomb, whose lead single, "Vertigo", gave the tour its title. The tour spanned five legs and ended in Honolulu on 9 December 2006.

The two concerts featured on Vertigo 2005: Live from Chicago were recorded and performed at the United Center in Chicago on 9–10 May 2005. The audio of the concerts was recorded by Robbie Adams and was produced and mixed by Carl Glanville, who had recorded most of the songs on How to Dismantle an Atomic Bomb, with mastering by Arnie Acosta. The video for the DVD was directed by Hamish Hamilton, who had previously directed Elevation 2001: Live from Boston, with Ned O'Hanlon, who also worked on Elevation 2001, as producer.

The documentary on the second disc was directed by Erica Forstadt with Ned O'Hanlan also acting as producer. The bonus material on the second disc featured surveillance cuts directed by Willie Williams, edited by Mark Reynolds, and produced by Sam Pattinson and an alternative music video of "Sometimes You Can't Make It on Your Own" directed by Phil Joanou with production again by Ned O'Hanlon.

=== Footage ===
The footage used in the DVD was shot live from two nights of the band's four concert stop in Chicago. The second concert was held on Bono's 45th birthday, 10 May, providing a ceremonious backdrop to the concert. Footage of the stage crew celebrating his birthday can be seen on the bonus second disc.

Although the recording was edited and cut between songs, the songs themselves are rarely edited; mistakes made by the band members are left in the DVD. During the bridge of "Elevation", Bono skips a few words when he is forced to clear his throat.

Along with the extra lights used to facilitate filming, Willie Williams and his crew used the United Center's LCD rings that circle the seating area (which generally display scores or advertisements during sporting events) to display additional patterns that correlated with the stage lighting, as well as static during "Zoo Station." Williams discusses this in his online diary on U2's website.

A clip of "Original of the Species" was used in commercials for Apple's first video capable iPods. Furthermore, the icon for "Artists" in the Music App of Apple's iPhone and iPod Touch is a silhouette of Bono singing "Original of the Species" during this concert.

"Party Girl" was performed both nights, on 9 May with Bono and a fan, and the second night with the full band and the same fan. However, neither was included on the DVD. A brief clip of the band rehearsing the song at the 10 May soundcheck can be seen on the documentary found on the second disc. All other songs performed between the two nights were included on the DVD, in the correct order. Audio was recorded for playback in the Dolby Digital 5.1, DTS 5.1, and PCM Stereo formats.

Before the band takes the stage, a snippet of Arcade Fire's song "Wake Up" is played.

== Release ==
On 22 November 2024, U2's 11th studio album, How to Dismantle an Atomic Bomb, was reissued to commemorate its 20th anniversary; an audio album of Vertigo 2005: Live from Chicago was included in deluxe box-set editions of the reissue. Coinciding with the anniversary release, the concert video was livestreamed on YouTube.

== Critical reception ==
Professional ratings
Review scores
Source	Rating
Allmusic	4/5 stars
The Austin Chronicle	3/5 stars
The Gazette	3/5 stars
IGN	10/10
The Irish Times	4/5 stars
MusicOMH	favourable
PopMatters	7/10
The Sacramento Bee	favourable
The Sydney Morning Herald	favourable
The Times	4/5 stars

Vertigo 2005 received generally favourable reviews. David Barton of The Sacramento Bee called the video "an essential document of the essential rock band of our time" that makes "the home viewing experience nearly as immediate as the live one". He praised Bono's stage presence and the band's maturity in their performances, and the set list for balancing hits with deep tracks. Barton criticised Hamilton's direction and quick cuts, saying that he "doesn't trust his performers enough to be visually interesting" and that the result was "condescending and irritating". Bernard Zuel of The Sydney Morning Herald said the band was "Still the best at this level", calling them "expansive and intimate" in their performance. The review concluded, "Creatively, but not ostentatiously, filmed, this show provides nothing but recognition and satisfaction for any fan." Brent Simon of IGN called the DVD "a fine and persuasive showcase for the greatest rock 'n' roll band of the last 25 years" and that it showed why the band "still matter[ed]". He believed U2 were still "an artistic force to be reckoned with" with shows that "never fail to satisfy", adding, "Vertigo 2005 movingly shows that, proving that the intimate can indeed be located in an arena setting". Simon thought that Hamilton was guilty of "over-direction" with "frenetic cuts that ironically rob songs of their natural energy". Cammila Albertson of Allmusic felt that the concert DVD accomplished its purpose, but that the lighting or camera movements in some scenes did not capture the moments as well as they should have. Raoul Hernandez of The Austin Chronicle called Vertigo 2005 "the least of U2's three live DVDs" released to that point. He judged that the performances from Boy "electrif[y] the first hour, but the UN infomercial in the back half bogs down save for the magic 'Running to Stand Still'," before the concert rebounded at the end with three songs from How to Dismantle an Atomic Bomb. In an overall positive review, John Murphy of MusicOMH felt that most fans did not need to purchase the DVD if they already owned Elevation 2001: Live from Boston or U2 Go Home: Live from Slane Castle, Ireland.

Mike Schiller of PopMatters said that "U2 manages to put on a show to be remembered, the perfect sort of show to be immortalized on the DVD medium". He lamented the "discombobulating and quick" visual editing as well as the discrepancy between the film's set list and what was actually performed, but he praised the multiple "U2 moments" and said the video "typifies nearly everything that the ideal U2 concert should contain". Angus Batey of The Times said that U2 made it look "devilishy easy" at being "on-the-road documentarians" and that the film confirmed them "as not merely the biggest rock band in the world, but the best; the production putting the focus squarely on a superbly balanced setlist". Batey criticised the bonus materials for being too scant. Leonard Martinez of the El Paso Times said that "Because they know how to work a camera, U2 probably does better than most bands when they release concert DVDs." He concluded, "No matter what you think of Bono's worldwide campaigning for various causes, this DVD proves he is still one of the best rock 'n' roll showmen in the business." Sean Moeller of the Quad-City Times praised the video, saying that it showed the "veteran band teaming with inedible marksmanship and ripping energy" and that they played a "strong, representative set that spans most of the band's illustrious life". Moeller thought the quick cuts and changes in camera angles "can make you dizzy at times, but so does the band, with its attention to rousing pageantry". Bernard Perusse of The Gazette called the DVD an "intermittently-incendiary concert" with a "disposable second disc", saying that compared to the actual shows from the tour, it was a "reasonable facsimile that might lack the immediacy, but offers better sound in the comfort of home". Brian Boyd of The Irish Times said, "The Vertigo tour really jumps out thanks to state-of-the-art camera work and presentation", while describing performances of the group's older songs as standouts.

== Track listing ==
1. "City of Blinding Lights"
2. "Vertigo"
3. "Elevation"
4. "The Cry/The Electric Co."
5. "An Cat Dubh / Into the Heart"
6. "Beautiful Day"
7. "New Year's Day"
8. "Miracle Drug"
9. "Sometimes You Can't Make It on Your Own"
10. "Love and Peace or Else"
11. "Sunday Bloody Sunday"
12. "Bullet the Blue Sky"
13. "Running to Stand Still"
14. "Pride (In the Name of Love)"
15. "Where the Streets Have No Name"
16. "One"
17. "Zoo Station"
18. "The Fly"
19. "Mysterious Ways"
20. "All Because of You"
21. "Original of the Species"
22. "Yahweh"
23. "40"

== Bonus disc ==
A second disc was issued in the "deluxe" digipack cardboard case edition of the DVD. It includes the following bonus features:

- Beyond the Tour: documentary
- Surveillance Cuts: filmed during the tour with remotely controlled infrared cameras
1. "Love and Peace or Else"
2. "An Cat Dubh/Into the Heart"
3. "Cry/The Electric Co."
4. "Running to Stand Still"
- "Sometimes You Can't Make It On Your Own": Alternative Video

== Charts ==
=== Weekly charts ===
Chart (2005)	Peak position
Australian Music DVD (ARIA)	1
Austrian Music DVD (Ö3 Austria)	1
Belgian Music DVD (Ultratop Flanders)	1
Belgian Music DVD (Ultratop Wallonia)	2
Danish Music DVD (Hitlisten)	1
Dutch Music DVD (MegaCharts)	1
Finnish Music DVD (Suomen virallinen lista)	2
German Albums (Offizielle Top 100)	20
Greek Top 20 DVD/Videos	3
Ireland Top 20 DVDs	6
Italian Music DVD (FIMI)	1
Japanese DVDs Chart (Oricon)	81
New Zealand Top 10 Music DVDs	1
Norwegian Top 10 DVDs	1
Portuguese Top 30 Music DVDs	1
Spanish Music DVD (Promusicae)	1
Swedish Music DVD (Sverigetopplistan)	1
Swiss Albums (Schweizer Hitparade)	24
UK Music Videos (Official Charts)	2
US Top Music Videos (Billboard)	2

Chart (2006)	Peak position
Hungarian DVDs (MAHASZ)	3

Chart (2009)	Peak position
French Music DVD (SNEP)	12

=== Year-end charts ===
Chart (2005)	Position
Australian Music DVD (ARIA)	15
Belgian Music DVD (Ultratop Flanders)	4
Belgian Music DVD (Ultratop Wallonia)	6
Dutch Music DVD (MegaCharts)	1
Italian Music DVD (FIMI)	4
Spanish Music DVD (PROMUSICAE)	2
Swedish Music DVD (Sverigetopplistan)	2
UK Music DVD (OCC)	7

Chart (2006)	Position
Australian Music DVD (ARIA)	3
Belgian Music DVD (Ultratop Flanders)	8
Belgian Music DVD (Ultratop Wallonia)	12
Dutch Music DVD (MegaCharts)	10
Italian Music DVD (FIMI)	9
Spanish Music DVD (PROMUSICAE)	6
Swedish Music DVD (Sverigetopplistan)	11

Chart (2007)	Position
Spanish Music DVD (PROMUSICAE)	6
Swedish Music DVD (Sverigetopplistan)	49

Chart (2009)	Position
Swedish Music DVD (Sverigetopplistan)	20

== Certifications ==
Region	Certification	Certified units/sales
Argentina (CAPIF)	Gold	4,000^{^}
Australia (ARIA)	6× Platinum	90,000^{^}
Brazil (Pro-Música Brasil)	Diamond	100,000^{*}
Denmark (IFPI Danmark)	Platinum	40,000^{^}
France (SNEP)	Diamond	100,000^{*}
Germany (BVMI)	Platinum	50,000^{^}
Ireland (IRMA)	Platinum	4,000^{^}
Italy dvd sales in 2005	—	50,000
Mexico (AMPROFON)	2× Platinum	40,000^{^}
Netherlands (NVPI)	Gold	40,000^{^}
Poland (ZPAV)	Gold	5,000^{*}
Portugal (AFP)	3× Platinum	24,000^{^}
Spain (Promusicae)	3× Platinum	75,000^{^}
Switzerland (IFPI Switzerland)	Gold	3,000^{^}
United Kingdom (BPI)	2× Platinum	100,000^{^}
^{*} Sales figures based on certification alone.^{^} Shipments figures based on certification alone.
