= Live from Under the Brooklyn Bridge =

- Digital release cover art

EP (Live) by U2
- Released: 9 December 2004
- Recorded: 22 November 2004
- Venues: Empire-Fulton Ferry State Park (Brooklyn, New York)
- Genre: Rock
- Length: 16:05
- Label: Island

U2 chronology
Love: Live from the Point Depot (2004)	Live from Under the Brooklyn Bridge (2004)	U2.Communication (2005)

Live from Under the Brooklyn Bridge is a digital EP by the Irish rock band U2, released exclusively through the iTunes Store in the United States and Canada on 8 December 2004. The four tracks have only been released digitally as AAC .m4p files. As of 12 May 2009, this EP is no longer available from the iTunes store, however it is available on YouTube.

All the tracks were recorded live on 22 November 2004, at a "surprise" concert held in Brooklyn, New York under the Brooklyn Bridge at Empire-Fulton Ferry State Park. The concert was performed after a full day of filming the music video for "All Because of You" in New York City. The concert itself was filmed for an MTV special called mtvJAMMED: U2.

== Track listing ==
All lyrics are written by Bono; all music is composed by U2.

No.	Title	Length
1.	"All Because of You"	3:42
2.	"Sometimes You Can't Make It on Your Own"	5:20
3.	"I Will Follow"	4:11
4.	"Vertigo"	3:32
Total length:		16:05

== Personnel ==
- Bono – lead vocals, guitar (on "She's a Mystery to Me")
- The Edge – guitar, keyboards, vocals
- Adam Clayton – bass guitar
- Larry Mullen Jr. – drums

== Entire concert setlist ==
This is a listing of all the tracks played at the Brooklyn Bridge concert on 22 November 2004. Only noted tracks have been officially released.

1. "Vertigo" – broadcast on the MTV special
2. "All Because of You" – released on digital EP and broadcast on the MTV special
3. "Miracle Drug"
4. "Sometimes You Can't Make It On Your Own" – released on digital EP and broadcast on the MTV special
5. "City of Blinding Lights" – released as a digital single on iTunes in Europe and Australia and broadcast on the MTV special
6. "Original of the Species"
7. "She's a Mystery to Me" – released on "All Because of You" single in Europe, Australia, and Japan and broadcast on the MTV special
8. "Beautiful Day" – broadcast on the MTV special

Encore

9. "Out of Control" – released on "City of Blinding Lights" single in Germany and broadcast on the MTV special
10. "I Will Follow" – released on digital EP and broadcast on the MTV special
11. "Vertigo" (reprise) – released on digital EP

== See also ==
- U2 discography
