= Medium, Rare & Remastered =

Compilation album by U2
- Released: February 22, 2009
- Recorded: 1980–2008
- Genre: Rock
- Length: 81:00
- Label: Universal

U2 chronology
Live from Paris (2007)	Medium, Rare & Remastered (2009)	No Line on the Horizon (2009)

Medium, Rare & Remastered is a compilation album of rarities and remastered tracks by the Irish rock band U2. It was released exclusively to subscribing members of U2.com, replacing U2 Go Home: Live from Slane Castle, Ireland on 22 February 2009. The double CD features tracks that were released as part of The Complete U2 digital box set, the bonus discs on the remastered albums to date, and some readily available single B-sides. The cover art was from the 1995 Passengers side project. The original photo featured longtime U2 producer Brian Eno, who also was involved in Passengers, but for this album, he was edited out of the photo.

== Track listing ==
All tracks are written by U2, except "Smile" (written by U2 and Simon Carmody), "Beautiful Ghost/Introduction to Songs of Experience" (lyrics by William Blake), and "Jesus Christ" (written by Woody Guthrie).

CD 1
No.	Title	Note	Length
1.	"Levitate"	from All That You Can't Leave Behind sessions	5:09
2.	"Love You Like Mad"	from All That You Can't Leave Behind sessions	4:19
3.	"Smile"	from How to Dismantle an Atomic Bomb sessions	3:18
4.	"Flower Child"	from All That You Can't Leave Behind sessions	4:56
5.	"Beautiful Ghost/Introduction to Songs of Experience"	from The Joshua Tree sessions	3:55
6.	"Jesus Christ"	from the Sun Studio sessions for Rattle and Hum	3:14
7.	"Xanax and Wine"	from How to Dismantle an Atomic Bomb sessions	4:39
8.	"All Because of You" (alternative version)		3:36
9.	"Native Son"	from How to Dismantle an Atomic Bomb sessions	3:10
10.	"Yahweh" (alternative version)		4:32
11.	"Sometimes You Can't Make It on Your Own" (alternative version)		5:31
Total length:			46:18

All tracks are written by U2, except "Neon Lights" (written by Karl Bartos, Ralf Hütter, and Florian Schneider).

CD 2
No.	Title	Note	Length
1.	"Saturday Night"	from the remastered Boy album	5:12
2.	"Trash, Trampoline and the Party Girl"	from the remastered October album	2:36
3.	"Angels Too Tied to the Ground"	from the remastered War album	3:35
4.	"Wave of Sorrow (Birdland)"	from the remastered The Joshua Tree album	4:07
5.	"Always"	B-side to "Beautiful Day" single	3:49
6.	"Summer Rain"	B-side to "Beautiful Day" single	4:08
7.	"Big Girls Are Best"	B-side to "Stuck in a Moment You Can't Get Out Of" single	3:37
8.	"Fast Cars" (Jacknife Lee Remix)	B-side to "Sometimes You Can't Make It on Your Own" single	3:30
9.	"Neon Lights"	B-side to "Vertigo" single	4:07
Total length:			34:41
