= How to Dismantle an Atomic Bomb =

Studio album by U2
- Released: 22 November 2004
- Recorded: February 2003 – July 2004
- Studios: Hanover Quay (Dublin); South of France
- Genre: Rock
- Length: 49:03
- Labels: Island; Interscope
- Producer: Steve Lillywhite

U2 chronology
U2 Go Home: Live from Slane Castle, Ireland (2003)	How to Dismantle an Atomic Bomb (2004)	The Complete U2 (2004)

Singles from How to Dismantle an Atomic Bomb
- 1. "Vertigo" Released: 8 November 2004; 2. "Sometimes You Can't Make It on Your Own" Released: 7 February 2005; 3. "City of Blinding Lights" Released: 6 June 2005; 4. "All Because of You" Released: 10 October 2005

How to Dismantle an Atomic Bomb is the eleventh studio album by Irish rock band U2. It was released on 22 November 2004 in the United Kingdom by Island Records and a day later in the United States by Interscope Records. It was produced by Steve Lillywhite, with additional production from Chris Thomas, Jacknife Lee, Nellee Hooper, Flood, Daniel Lanois, Brian Eno, and Carl Glanville. Much like their previous album All That You Can't Leave Behind (2000), the record exhibits a more mainstream rock sound after the band experimented with alternative rock and dance music in the 1990s.

Looking for a more hard-hitting sound than that of their previous album, U2 began recording How to Dismantle an Atomic Bomb in February 2003 with Thomas. After nine months of work, the band had an album's worth of material ready for release, but they were not satisfied with the results. The group subsequently enlisted Lillywhite to take over as producer in Dublin in January 2004. Lillywhite, along with his assistant Lee, spent six months with the band reworking songs and encouraging better performances. U2 lead singer Bono described the album as "our first rock album. It's taken us twenty years or whatever it is, but this is our first rock album." Thematically, the record touches on life, death, love, war, faith, and family.

How to Dismantle an Atomic Bomb received generally positive reviews from critics and reached number one in 34 countries, including the US, where first-week sales of 840,000 copies nearly doubled the band's previous personal best. The album and its singles won all eight Grammy Awards for which they were nominated. It was also the fourth-highest-selling album of 2004, with almost ten million copies sold, and it yielded several successful singles, such as "Vertigo", "City of Blinding Lights", and "Sometimes You Can't Make It on Your Own". The album was included on Rolling Stone's list of the "100 Best Albums of the Decade" at number 68. U2 commemorated the album's 20th anniversary with a remastered re-release, which includes a companion album of tracks from the recording sessions called How to Re-Assemble an Atomic Bomb.

== Writing and recording ==
Heading into How to Dismantle an Atomic Bomb, U2's guitarist the Edge said the group felt it was the appropriate moment to explore their early musical inspirations. U2's lead vocalist Bono said in a 2005 interview, "I went back and listened to all the music that made me want to be in a band, right from the Buzzcocks, Siouxsie and the Banshees, Echo & The Bunnymen, all that stuff. And what was interesting is, that was what a lot of people in bands now are listening to anyway. So in a funny way, it made us completely contemporary." U2 also wanted to make a concerted effort to revisit the same creative approach from their formative years: the ethos of the band members playing together in a room, with just guitar, bass, and drums. The Edge said: "The limitations that creates are an interesting challenge because you have to do it with just those instruments, and dynamics become a hugely important part of the creative process."

=== Sessions with Thomas ===
Rather than repeat themselves after their previous record, All That You Can't Leave Behind (2000), U2 were seeking a harder-hitting, more guitar-driven rock sound in response to the success of the album's single "Beautiful Day". As a result, they hired producer Chris Thomas, who had worked on some of their favourite records, including Never Mind the Bollocks, Here's the Sex Pistols by the Sex Pistols and early works by Roxy Music. The Edge said that he wanted Thomas to put the same stamp on U2's record that he had done on Never Mind the Bollocks, "The White Album" by the Beatles, and The Dark Side of the Moon by Pink Floyd. U2 began recording with Thomas in February 2003; the Edge said the sessions were intended to have a "visceral band sound", and that he wanted a guitar tone like Steve Jones's on Never Mind the Bollocks. To get into the desired creative mindset, the group continued their "power hour" tradition that began years prior with their long-time producer Daniel Lanois; several times a week, regardless of what they were working on, the band set aside time to improvise new material together, often producing two or three new song ideas. The Edge said this generated intrigue around the new pieces of music and used "the right kind of chaos where a radical element will be the thing that we'll all jump on to work with, whatever it might be".

The Edge said that in retrospect, the group struggled with Thomas at the production helm. They had begun with a lot of basic song ideas that were "out of focus", which they sensed Thomas was not accustomed to. The Edge said when it came to realising their "visceral band in the room" approach, U2 "over-emphasised [their] songwriterly methodology and didn't trust enough the raw energy of what a band can do". He thought they had made progress with Thomas, but upon listening to rough mixes of their material, they realised that their desire to musically "push the chaos further" was being tempered by Thomas's instinct to rein them in, and that the songs sounded "too polite". Late in 2003, the band visited AIR Studios in London to record overdubs with a 20-person string section "to give a few songs some lift". Bassist Adam Clayton called the session the moment "the wheels came off"; he sensed the musicians' lack of enthusiasm for the band's music, saying: "We could read the room. And they were not going, 'Wow, guys, this is really happening!'"

After nine months of work, the band had completed an album's worth of songs. In October 2003, they met in Dublin to review their work. Bono and the Edge believed it was good enough to release; Bono said, "All we needed was the assent of the politburo and the record would have been out for Christmas." Clayton and drummer Larry Mullen Jr., however, disagreed with their bandmates and voted against releasing the record. Mullen said that the songs "had no magic", while Clayton said, "When it comes to signing off on a project, you ask questions like, 'Have we got a first single to open the campaign?' Frankly, we were missing more than just a first single." Clayton and Mullen also felt that All That You Can't Leave Behind had been overpraised, and they considered "Beautiful Day" to be the only hit single that the album generated. Clayton thought that if U2's goal was to continue to be the world's biggest band, they needed three or four hits from their album that could attract new fans.

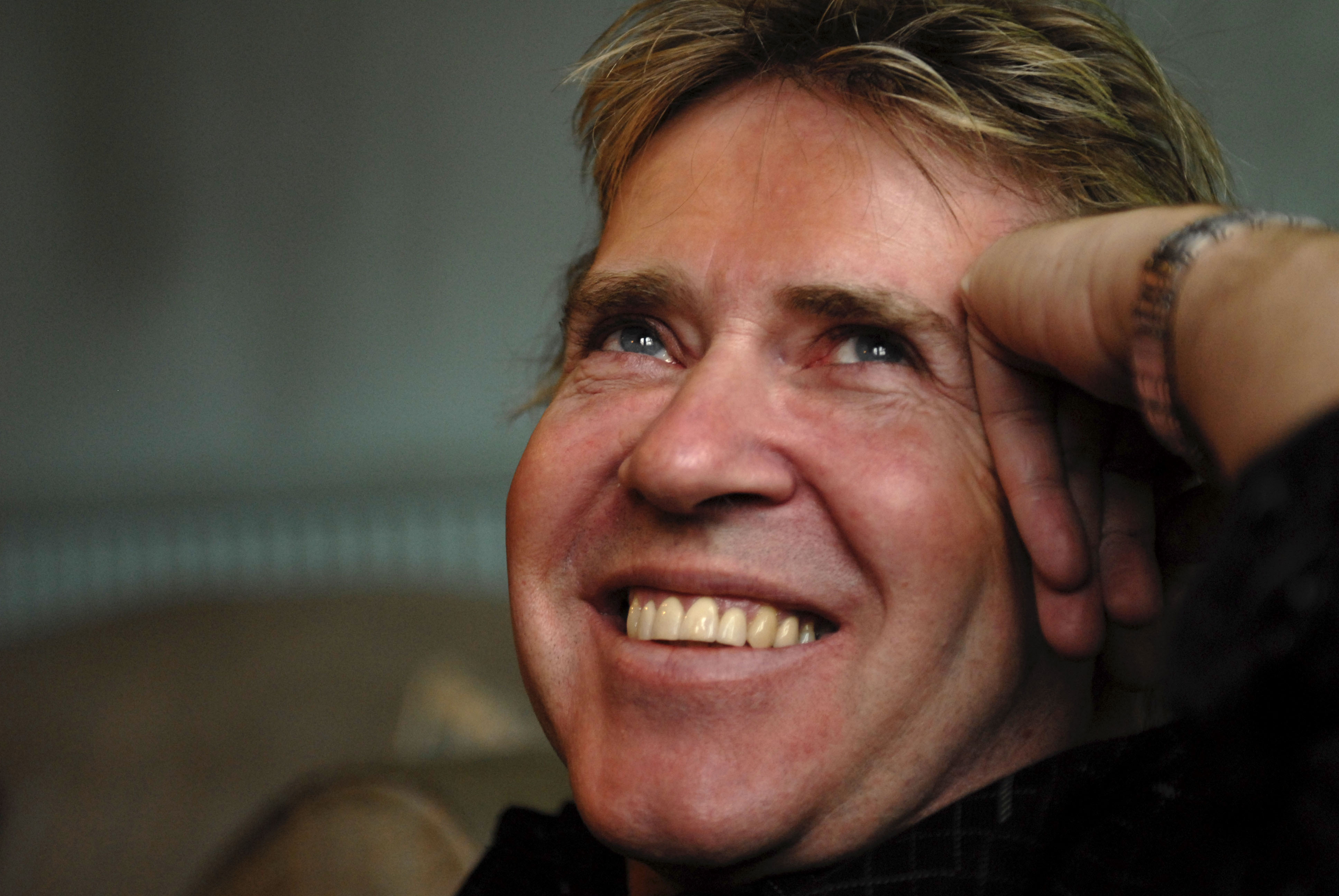
Steve Lillywhite (pictured) took over as producer of the album after U2's dissatisfaction with their work with Chris Thomas.

The group brought in their long-time producer Steve Lillywhite to mediate the disagreement. After they played him the album, Lillywhite assessed that it felt like "it had the weight of the world on its shoulders. It certainly wasn't any fun." After lengthy discussions, Bono and the Edge were convinced that the album needed more work. Bono thought their songs were good but admitted "good won't bring you to tears or make you want to leave your house and tour for a year". Without making any firm decision on the album's producer, the group decided to undertake recording sessions with Lillywhite and see where it led them.

=== Sessions with Lillywhite ===
The band began recording with Lillywhite and his assistant Jacknife Lee in Dublin in January 2004. The Edge says that the group quickly fell into a much more organic creative process with Lillywhite, with he and Lee reworking songs and encouraging better performances from the band. One of the first tracks on which Lillywhite made an impact was "Native Son". While Bono was away for a few days, Lillywhite suggested the band record a better take of the song. After Bono returned and attempted to record vocals over the new backing track, he quickly decided that the lyrics no longer suited the song and that he would need a new lyrical and melodic approach; this ultimately led to the song's evolution into "Vertigo".

Lillywhite and Lee ultimately worked with the band for six months. Several other producers received credits on the album, including Lanois, Brian Eno, Flood, Carl Glanville, and Nellee Hooper; Bono acknowledged that the involvement of multiple producers affected the record's "sonic cohesion".

A demo version of the album (guitarist the Edge's copy) was stolen while the band were having their photo taken for a magazine in France in July 2004. It contained unfinished versions of several songs that made it onto the album. The band publicly announced that if those tracks were leaked online, they would release the album immediately via the iTunes Store. Several months later, the finished album was leaked online, but the band did not release it earlier, despite previous comments.

In late 2004, "Mercy", an unreleased track taken from the How to Dismantle an Atomic Bomb sessions, surfaced on the Internet through a fan who had been given a copy of the album containing the extra track. The track is of less than standard audio quality, but managed to become a favorite on fan websites. It was cut from the final release, but was described by Blender as "a six-and-a-half-minute outpouring of U2 at its most uninhibitedly U2-ish". The lyrics to the song can be found in the booklet for the Special Limited Edition. A significantly revised version of the song was performed during the European leg of the U2 360° Tour; it made its live debut on 12 September 2010 during the second Zurich concert, and was officially released as the opening track on the band's Wide Awake in Europe vinyl-only live EP that November.

== Composition ==
As with All That You Can't Leave Behind, this album finds U2 returning to "more 'stripped down' rock and pop sounds", according to musicologist Susan Fast.

Adam Clayton said of Atomic Bomb, "It's very much a guitar record. "Vertigo", "Love and Peace", "City of Blinding Lights", "All Because of You", all pretty up, rocky tunes. A lot of them are a kick-back to our very early days, so it's like with each year we have gathered a little bit more and this is what we are now."

In 2003, Bono said one of their new songs called "Full Metal Jacket" was "the mother of all rock songs" and "the reason to make a new album". A similar demo called "Native Son" was also recorded. Both of these demos would later become "Vertigo".

Contemporary Christian artist Michael W. Smith joined the band in the studio during the Atomic Bomb sessions and worked on at least one track with them, entitled "North Star". That track, which was a tribute to Johnny Cash, has not yet surfaced officially or unofficially in any form. A song introduced by Bono as "North Star" was played in Turin during the U2 360° Tour; however, it is unknown whether or not this is the same song that was worked on during the sessions. Other tracks, such as "Shark Soup" (another version of "Vertigo"), "Lead Me in the Way I Should Go", and "You Can't Give Away Your Heart", were referenced in the media and by the band themselves, but have not been released.

"City of Blinding Lights" (2004)
"City of Blinding Lights" is one of the tracks which reflects back to the band's earlier work.

The very earliest versions of "Love and Peace or Else" originated during the recording sessions for All That You Can't Leave Behind. It serves as Atomic Bomb's "big plea for peace" song, following in the footsteps of "Sunday Bloody Sunday", "Miss Sarajevo", "Please", and "Peace on Earth". During performances on the Vertigo Tour, "Love and Peace Or Else" featured Mullen moving out to the center of the ellipse-shaped ramp, where he played a floor tom and crash cymbal for the majority of the song. Near the end, Bono took over and played the drum until the song segued into the opening drumbeat of "Sunday Bloody Sunday". Most live performances of the song also saw Mullen singing the "release, release, release, release" part during the chorus alongside Bono.

"Crumbs from Your Table" is about the relationship between Western countries and developing countries. The verses and chorus address the relationship from the perspective of citizens from the developing world, focusing on the disparity between the long-term socioeconomic planning stressed by the West ("You speak in signs and wonders") and the developing world's immediate need for sustenance ("But I'm begging for the crumbs from your table"). One line ("You speak in signs and wonders") was meant as a criticism of the Catholic Church. The bridge ("Where you live should not decide / Whether you live or whether you die") is statement from Bono that follows with the theme in his speeches in which he tries to raise awareness about African poverty. Bono stated on a bonus DVD included with special editions of the album that the band has no recollection of writing the song, as they were intoxicated at the time. A studio performance is also included on the aforementioned bonus DVD. It was only played a handful on times during the third leg of the Vertigo Tour.

"One Step Closer" is a slow tempo song, with Bono's lyrics centered around traffic images, leading to the singer being stranded on a refuge island. The origins of the song go back to the All That You Can't Leave Behind sessions. It was revived for Atomic Bomb, with Lanois introducing a pedal steel guitar, in addition to guitars from the Edge and Bono, and musical influences varying from country music to The Velvet Underground making themselves felt. One recording of the song ran for more than 15 minutes, with Bono adding many verses that were subsequently dropped. Jacknife Lee also contributed to the final form of the recording. "One Step Closer" is billed in the album with thanks to Noel Gallagher of Oasis. The title of the song comes from a conversation Bono had with Gallagher about Bono's dying father, Bob Hewson. Bono asked, "Do you think he believes in God?" to which Gallagher replied, "Well, he's one step closer to knowing." Through the end of the Vertigo Tour, the song had never been performed in any U2 concert. The title of the album derives from a lyric in the song "Fast Cars", which was only available on some versions of the album.

== Promotion ==
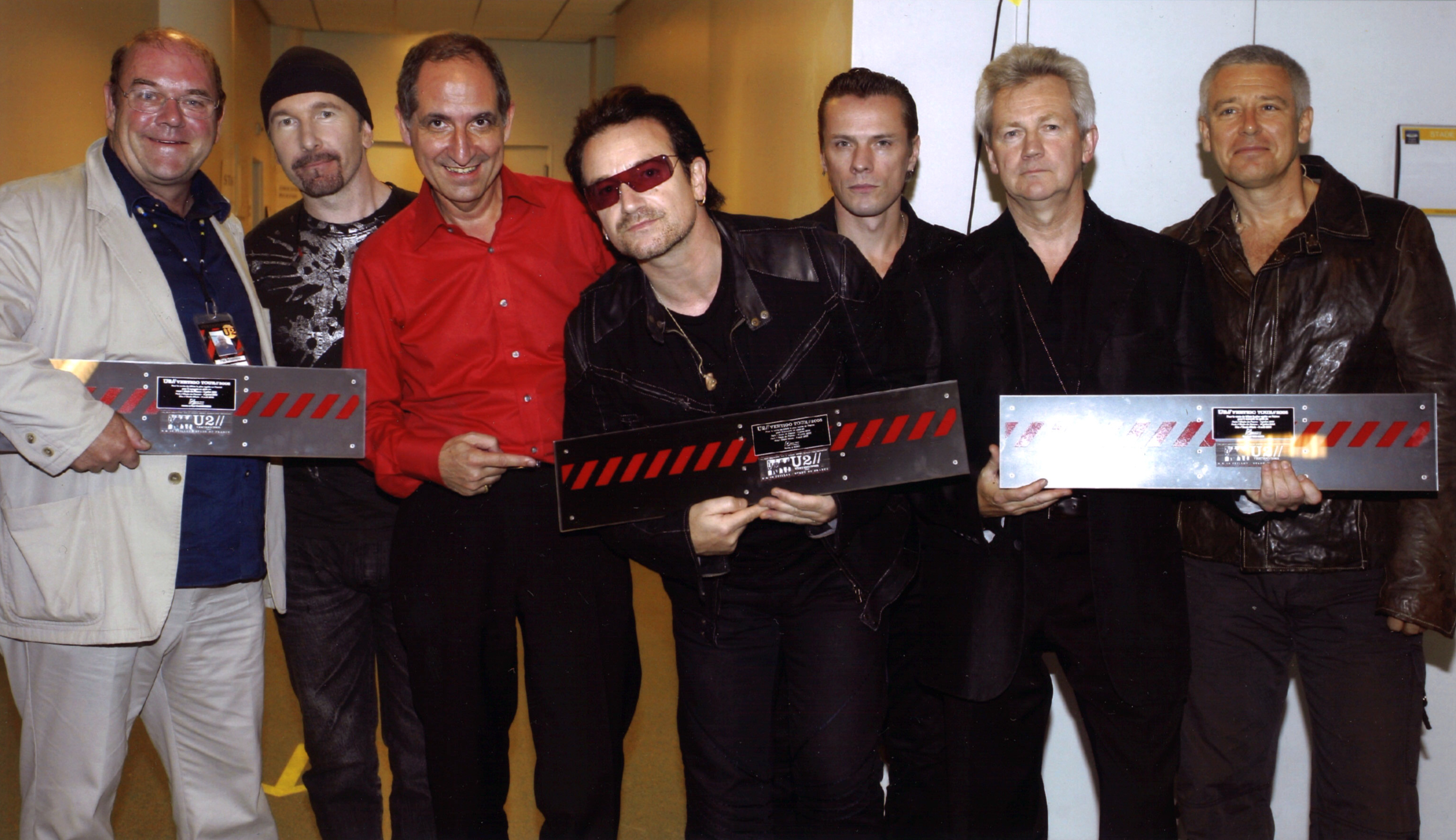
U2, their manager Paul McGuinness, and concert promoters Gérard Drouot and Michael Deeny pose with copies of the album before a 2005 concert in France

For the album release, U2 partnered with Apple Inc. for several cross-promotions. "Vertigo" was featured on a widely aired television advertisement for the company's iPod music player. Additionally, a special edition U2-branded iPod was released bearing the black and red color scheme of the album, as well as laser-engraved autographs of each member on the back. The Complete U2, an iTunes Store-exclusive box set featuring 448 tracks, including previously unreleased content was also released. Proceeds from the iPod and iTunes partnerships were donated to charity. A live version of "Original of the Species" from the concert film Vertigo 2005: Live from Chicago was later featured in commercials for the video iPod. Several CD copies of the album have the message "Miss You Sugar" on the bottom of the CD near the matrix number.

The compilation Medium, Rare & Remastered and the EP Unreleased and Rare, included in The Complete U2 box set, contains previously unreleased tracks, six of which were from the recording sessions for How to Dismantle an Atomic Bomb:

1. "Xanax and Wine" (alternate early version of "Fast Cars")
2. "Native Son" (alternate early version of "Vertigo")
3. "Smile" (outtake from the How to Dismantle an Atomic Bomb Sessions)
4. "Sometimes You Can't Make It on Your Own" (early version)
5. "All Because of You" (alternate version)
6. "Yahweh" (alternate mix by Chris Thomas)

U2 made various promotional appearances on television. On 20 November 2004, U2 appeared as the musical guests on Saturday Night Live, performing "Vertigo", "Sometimes You Can't Make It on Your Own", and "I Will Follow". Two days later, on the day of the album's release, U2 performed on a flat-bed truck, which drove through much of downtown New York City. Footage of the flat-bed performance was used for the music video of "All Because of You". The drive ended at the Brooklyn Bridge, under which the band performed a "secret gig" in Empire Fulton Ferry State Park. Part of the concert was broadcast in an MTV television programme and released in the EP Live from Under the Brooklyn Bridge.

=== Formats ===
How to Dismantle an Atomic Bomb was released in four different formats:

- Standard Edition – with album CD
- Double CD/DVD Edition – with album CD and bonus DVD, featuring making of the album footage and bonus performances
- Special Limited Edition – with album CD, bonus DVD, and a hardcover book, featuring extracts from band members, song lyrics, original paintings, illustrations and photography
- Vinyl LP

=== Singles ===
The album was preceded by the lead single "Vertigo", which was released on 24 September 2004. The song topped the charts in several countries, including the UK, reached number 31 on the US Billboard Hot 100, and topped the Modern Rock Tracks chart. It also topped the digital downloads chart in both the US and the UK, becoming U2's best-selling digital single ever in the US, with 2× Platinum status (note that for downloads, Platinum status was obtained at 200,000 copies sold). Upon release the song received extensive airplay and was an international hit, being featured in a popular iPod television commercial. The song lent its namesake to the band's Vertigo Tour.

The second single in the UK was "Sometimes You Can't Make It on Your Own", released on 7 February 2005. The song is about Bono's relationship with his dying father. The song debuted at number one on the UK Singles Chart, becoming U2's first-ever follow-up single to top the charts. On US adult contemporary radio, it reached number 15 on the Adult Top 40 and also appeared on the Modern Rock Tracks chart, the Pop 100, and the Hot 100.

"City of Blinding Lights" was the third UK release. It peaked at number 2 and spent nine weeks on the chart. It also placed on the US Adult Top 40.

The second single in the US was "All Because of You". Although it received some airplay on rock radio, reaching number 6 on the Modern Rock Tracks chart and number 20 on the Mainstream Rock Tracks chart, the song had little mainstream exposure. When released in the UK, it peaked at number 4 but only spent four weeks on the chart.

"Original of the Species" was released as a promotional single in the US. It peaked at number 6 on the Triple A Chart according to mediaguide.com and the video has reached number 12 on VH1's top 20 video countdown. The track has also made brief appearances on the Hot AC charts according to Radio and Records and MediaGuide.

== Reception ==
=== Critical reaction ===
Professional ratings
Aggregate scores
Source	Rating
Metacritic	79/100
Review scores
Source	Rating
AllMusic	3.5/5 stars
Blender	4/5 stars
Entertainment Weekly	B
The Guardian	4/5 stars
Los Angeles Times	4/4 stars
NME	9/10
Pitchfork	6.9/10
Q	4/5 stars
Rolling Stone	4/5 stars
Uncut	4/5 stars

How to Dismantle an Atomic Bomb received generally positive reviews from critics. At Metacritic, which assigns a normalized score out of 100 to ratings from critics, the album received an average score of 79 based on 26 reviews. Rob Sheffield of Rolling Stone described it as "grandiose music from grandiose men, sweatlessly confident in the execution of their duties", believing the album was well served by not tamping down Bono's ego or ambitions. Sheffield praised "Sometimes You Can't Make It on Your Own", calling it "a reminder that what makes U2 so big isn't really their clever ideas, or even their intelligence – it's the warmth that all too few rock stars have any idea how to turn into music". Johnny Davis of Q said that the Edge's guitar playing "makes this record" with his "arsenal of guitar noises that bring to mind a particularly impatient boy with a new box of indoor fireworks". Responding to Bono's quote about the group wanting to stave off a decline, Davis said, "They've succeeded in not becoming crap quite admirably." Robert Hilburn of the Los Angeles Times called the album "triumphant", praising U2's "journey from adolescence to maturity" over their career as one that few groups could make "with their creative vision so fully intact". He said that Bono lyrically "explores epic themes, from faith to family, with such indelible grace that the CD stands with 'The Joshua Tree' and 'Achtung Baby' as one of the Irish quartet's essential works". Dan Martin of NME called it "a classic U2 album, but also a breathtakingly modern heavy fucker", adding that "Bono's genius is that his inner monologue is so huge and heroic that it matches the scale of the music". Steve Morse of The Boston Globe called it a "nakedly honest, uplifting album" and their most personal one since The Joshua Tree. He called it "a joy to see the group rekindle its shimmering '80s guitar-pop sound" and was encouraged that their music "comes so strongly from the gut once again, without the latest techno-experimental production techniques." Ann Powers of Blender called the album a "tour de force of tune and mood", adding, "because U2's sound has come to signify an open heart... it nearly always feels fresh, the way a new flame does". She thought that Bono lyrically "wields sentimentality like a switchblade" but also said that "U2's music is so broad and welcoming it can express ardor equally well for Christ, wives, supermodels, children or Bishop Desmond Tutu".

Stephen Troussé of Uncut called it "their most unabashedly strident record since The Unforgettable Fire" and said that songs such as "City of Blinding Lights" and "All Because of You" gave "the sense of a band flexing muscles they haven't used in years". He remarked about the melancholic undertow of Bono's lyrics, believing that the "lines that stay with you speak of a creeping malaise". Alexis Petridis of The Guardian said that the album "may be unadventurous and melodramatic, but it is packed with disarming moments". He thought the group had embraced the clichéd elements of their 1980s music but said, "Driven by a ferociously powerful rhythm section, U2 sound pleasingly raw, particularly next to the current wave of stadium rock pretenders". He lamented the abandonment of their 1990s experimentation, but appreciated their retention of self-awareness, concluding, "it seems highly unlikely anyone will laugh at U2 again". David Browne of Entertainment Weekly questioned U2's motivations for back-pedaling musically but called them "one of the few remaining bands who can make pop-chart lust work for them, as Atomic Bomb intermittently demonstrates". Greg Kot of the Chicago Tribune said that the record "marks a retreat from innovation and daring, and re-immerses the Irish quartet in the comfort zone of its earliest successes". He believed the band had "settl[ed] into middle age by recycling its best riffs and ideas" and that those musical ideas were "destined to pale in coming years as second-hand versions of those classic albums". Amanda Petrusich of Pitchfork called the record "brash, grungy, and loud" but not "especially surprising", judging it to contain a "tiny handful of outstanding tracks and a whole mess of schmaltzy filler". She criticised Bono's "vague, cliched observations, his sentiments always awkwardly bombastic or hopelessly maudlin" and thought the album's biggest issue was "that it sounds so much like U2". Keith Harris of The Village Voice said that the lyrics were marred by "legions of rampant clichés" and that the album's producers "simply construct a U2 album in miniature, mixing in the Edge's processed-guitar trademark whenever you fear they're straying into unforgivable un-U2ness. That's just not enough."

=== Commercial performance ===
Following its 22 November 2004 release, How to Dismantle an Atomic Bomb reached number one in 34 countries. In the US, the album debuted atop the Billboard 200, with first-week sales of 840,000 copies, setting a new personal best for the group; it was nearly double their previous mark set by All That You Can't Leave Behind, which sold 428,000 copies in its first week. It also debuted at number one on the UK Albums Chart and the Australian ARIA Charts. The album has sold 9 million copies worldwide. According to Nielsen SoundScan, the album sold 3.3 million copies in the US through March 2014.

=== Accolades ===
How to Dismantle an Atomic Bomb was rated the best album of 2004 by USA Today, Paste, and The New York Times. Hilburn of the Los Angeles Times called it the second-best album of the year, and it was ranked fourth respectively by Q in its list of the best albums of the year. The Village Voice rated it the eighth-best album of 2004, while PopMatters ranked it 25th. It was included in Rolling Stone's Top 50 Albums of 2004.

How to Dismantle an Atomic Bomb and its songs won eight Grammy Awards overall in 2005 and 2006, sweeping all of the categories in which they were nominated. In 2005, "Vertigo" won in three categories: Best Rock Song, Best Rock Performance by a Duo or Group with Vocal, and Best Short Form Music Video. In 2006, "Sometimes You Can't Make It on Your Own" was awarded Song of the Year and Best Rock Performance by a Duo or Group with Vocal, "City of Blinding Lights" was awarded Best Rock Song, and How to Dismantle an Atomic Bomb won for Best Rock Album and Album of the Year. The album producer's Steve Lillywhite, who accepted the Album of the Year Grammy on behalf of Interscope Records, was also awarded Producer of the Year, Non Classical in 2006.

Rolling Stone rated it the 68th-best album of the decade, while "Vertigo" was ranked the 64th-best song. Despite all of the critical acclaim for the album, Bono would later state that "[t]here are no weak songs. But as an album, the whole isn't greater than the sum of its parts, and it fucking annoys me."

== Vertigo Tour ==
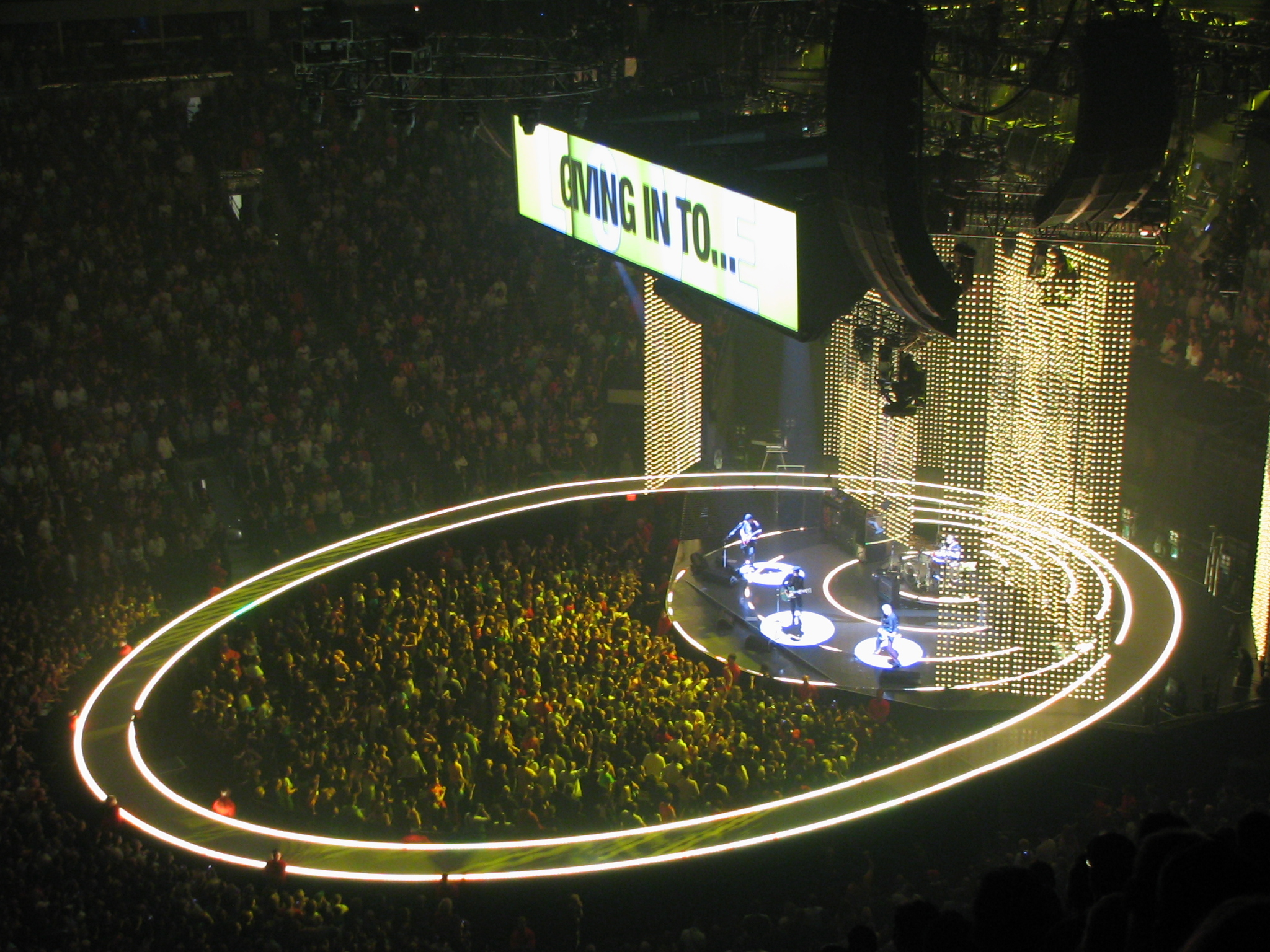
The indoor legs of the Vertigo Tour featured an ellipse-shaped ramp encircling the main stage, along with LED curtains.

In support of the album, U2 launched the Vertigo Tour, which featured five legs and a total of 131 shows. The first and third legs featured indoor concerts in North America, while the second and fourth legs featured outdoor concerts in Europe, Mexico and South America, respectively. The final leg, which saw the band touring the Pacific, was delayed due to an illness suffered by The Edge's daughter Sian. The stage design of the indoor Vertigo Tour shows was a stripped-down, intimate affair for the fans and featured an ellipse-shaped B-stage extending from the main stage. In total, the Vertigo Tour earned $389 million from 4.62 million tickets sold, the second-highest gross for any tour at the time. Three concert films depicting the tour, Vertigo 2005: Live from Chicago, Vertigo: Live from Milan, and U2 3D, were recorded.

== 20th anniversary remastered edition ==
On 26 September 2024, U2 announced that How to Dismantle an Atomic Bomb would be reissued to commemorate its 20th anniversary. As part of the project, the album was remastered and was released on vinyl, CD, cassette tape, and digitally. The song "Fast Cars", previously a bonus track exclusive to some regions, was included on the reissue. The group also released what they referred to as a "shadow album" called How to Re-Assemble an Atomic Bomb, comprising 10 songs unearthed from the recording sessions. The collection includes the track "Luckiest Man in the World", which was leaked onto the internet under the working title "Mercy" 20 years prior. Three songs from the collection, "Country Mile", "Picture of You (X+W)", and "Happiness", were released as promotional singles. The deluxe box-set editions of the reissue include the How to Re-Assemble an Atomic Bomb collection, an audio album of Vertigo 2005: Live from Chicago, B-sides and remixes, and a book of photography by Anton Corbijn.

The physical formats of How to Dismantle an Atomic Bomb's 20th anniversary reissue were released on 22 November 2024, as was a digital "Re-Assemble Edition" that pairs the record with How to Re-Assemble an Atomic Bomb; coinciding with the release date, the band's Vertigo 2005: Live from Chicago concert was livestreamed on YouTube. The "shadow album" was released as a standalone black-and-red marble vinyl record for Record Store Day on 29 November.

The physical formats of the reissue comprise:

- Super Deluxe Collectors Boxset on 8-disc vinyl
- Super Deluxe Collectors Boxset on 5-disc CD
- 2-disc vinyl
- 2-disc vinyl, black-and-red ink spot edition (direct-to-consumer)
- Single CD
- Red and black cassette tape

== Track listing ==
All lyrics are written by Bono except where noted; all music is composed by U2.

No.	Title	Lyrics	Producer	Length
1.	"Vertigo"	Bono and the Edge	Steve Lillywhite	3:14
2.	"Miracle Drug"	Bono and the Edge	Lillywhite; Carl Glanville,^{[a]} Jacknife Lee^{[a]}	3:59
3.	"Sometimes You Can't Make It on Your Own"		Chris Thomas; Lillywhite,^{[a]} Nellee Hooper^{[a]}	5:08
4.	"Love and Peace or Else"	Bono and the Edge	Brian Eno, Daniel Lanois; Thomas,^{[a]} Lee,^{[a]} Flood^{[a]}	4:50
5.	"City of Blinding Lights"		Flood; Thomas,^{[a]} Lee^{[a]}	5:47
6.	"All Because of You"		Lillywhite	3:39
7.	"A Man and a Woman"		Lee; Lillywhite,^{[a]} Glanville^{[a]}	4:30
8.	"Crumbs from Your Table"		Lillywhite; Lee^{[a]}	5:03
9.	"One Step Closer"		Thomas, Lanois; Lee^{[a]}	3:51
10.	"Original of the Species"		Lillywhite; Lee^{[a]}	4:41
11.	"Yahweh"	Bono and the Edge	Thomas	4:21
Total length:				49:03

UK, Ireland and Japan CD bonus track
No.	Title	Lyrics	Producer	Length
12.	"Fast Cars"	Bono and the Edge	Lillywhite	3:43
Total length:				53:09

Notes

- ^{^[a]} – additional production
- "Fast Cars" is a bonus track on the Japan, UK and Ireland CD edition, Special Limited Edition in all regions, and the digital version, included in The Complete U2. A new mix was featured on the "All Because of You" single.

Double CD/DVD and Special Limited editions, bonus DVD (2004 release)
No.	Title	Length
1.	"U2 and 3 Songs" (The Documentary)	20:02
2.	"Sometimes You Can't Make It on Your Own" (Studio Performance)	5:09
3.	"Crumbs from Your Table" (live in studio)	5:00
4.	"Vertigo" (Temple Bar Mix)	3:08
5.	"Sometimes You Can't Make It on Your Own" (Acoustic Couch Mix)	4:43
6.	"Vertigo"	3:23
Total length:		43:00

Note

- Handwritten lyrics for "Sometimes You Can't Make It on Your Own" are included on the DVD as an Easter egg.

How to Re-Assemble an Atomic Bomb (2024 re-release)
No.	Title	Length
1.	"Picture of You (X+W)"	4:18
2.	"Evidence of Life"	3:06
3.	"Luckiest Man in the World"	6:12
4.	"Treason"	4:44
5.	"I Don't Wanna See You Smile"	3:17
6.	"Country Mile"	4:58
7.	"Happiness"	4:29
8.	"Are You Gonna Wait Forever?"	3:50
9.	"Theme from The Batman"	1:43
10.	"All Because of You 2"	3:33

== Personnel ==
Personnel taken from How to Dismantle an Atomic Bomb CD booklet.

U2

- Bono – lead vocals, additional guitar (tracks 2, 9, 10 & 11), piano (5), additional backing vocals (2 - bridge)
- The Edge – guitar, backing/additional vocals (1–7, 9, 11), piano (2, 4–5, 10–11), keyboards (3), additional percussion (7), synthesizer (10–11)
- Adam Clayton – bass guitar
- Larry Mullen Jr. – drums, percussion, backing vocal (2)

Additional performers

- Jacknife Lee – synthesizers/additional synthesizers (1–2, 4–5, 7–10), programming (2, 4), keyboards (6, 12), additional guitar atmospherics (8)
- Daniel Lanois – additional guitar and pedal steel (9), mandolin (11), shaker (4)
- Carl Glanville – additional percussion and synthesizers (2)
- Brian Eno – synthesizers (4)
- Fabien Waltmann – programming (3, 5)

Technical personnel

- Steve Lillywhite – production (1, 2, 6, 8, 10), additional production (3, 7), mixing (1, 2, 8, 12)
- Chris Thomas – production (3, 9, 11), additional production (4, 5)
- Daniel Lanois – production (4, 9)
- Brian Eno – production (4)
- Flood – production (5), additional production (4), mixing (4, 6, 8, 10)
- Jacknife Lee – production (7), additional production (2, 4, 5, 8–10), mixing (7–9)
- Nellee Hooper – additional production (3), mixing (3, 5)
- Carl Glanville – additional production (2, 7), recording (all tracks), mixing (1, 2, 11)
- Chris Heaney – recording assistance (all tracks)
- Kieran Lynch – mix assistance (4, 6, 8, 10), recording assistance (5)
- Simon Gogerly – mix engineering (3, 5)
- Greg Collins – mix engineering (3, 5)
- Simon Osbourne – additional mix engineering (3)
- Ian Rossiter – assistant mix engineering (3, 5)

== Charts ==
=== Weekly charts ===
Chart (2004–2006)	Peak position
Argentine Albums (CAPIF)	1
Australian Albums (ARIA)	1
Austrian Albums (Ö3 Austria)	1
Belgian Albums (Ultratop Flanders)	1
Belgian Albums (Ultratop Wallonia)	2
Canadian Albums (Billboard)	1
Croatian International Albums (HDU)	1
Czech Albums (ČNS IFPI)	1
Danish Albums (Hitlisten)	1
Dutch Albums (Album Top 100)	1
European Albums (Billboard)	1
Finnish Albums (Suomen virallinen lista)	1
French Albums (SNEP)	1
German Albums (Offizielle Top 100)	1
Greek Albums (IFPI)	1
Hungarian Albums (MAHASZ)	4
Irish Albums (IRMA)	1
Italian Albums (FIMI)	1
Japanese Albums (Oricon)	4
Mexican Albums (Top 100 Mexico)	3
New Zealand Albums (RMNZ)	1
Norwegian Albums (VG-lista)	1
Polish Albums (ZPAV)	1
Portuguese Albums (AFP)	1
Scottish Albums (Official Charts)	1
Spanish Albums (PROMUSICAE)	1
Swedish Albums (Sverigetopplistan)	1
Swiss Albums (Schweizer Hitparade)	1
UK Albums (Official Charts)	1
US Billboard 200	1
US Top Rock Albums (Billboard)	12

Chart (2017)	Peak position
US Vinyl Albums (Billboard)	25

=== Year-end charts ===
Chart (2004)	Position
Australian Albums (ARIA)	23
Austrian Albums (Ö3 Austria)	18
Belgian Albums (Ultratop Flanders)	8
Belgian Alternative Albums (Ultratop Flanders)	2
Belgian Albums (Ultratop Wallonia)	20
Danish Albums (Hitlisten)	16
Dutch Albums (Album Top 100)	7
Finnish Albums (Suomen viralinen lista)	12
French Albums (SNEP)	18
German Albums (Offizielle Top 100)	81
Hungarian Albums (MAHASZ)	42
Irish Albums (IRMA)	1
Italian Albums (FIMI)	10
New Zealand Albums (RMNZ)	24
Portuguese Albums (AFP)	4
Spanish Albums (PROMUSICAE)	20
Swedish Albums (Sverigetopplistan)	2
Swedish Albums & Compilations (Sverigetopplistan)	3
Swiss Albums (Schweizer Hitparade)	20
UK Albums (OCC)	14
Worldwide Albums (IFPI)	4

Chart (2005)	Position
Australian Albums (ARIA)	26
Austrian Albums (Ö3 Austria)	15
Belgian Albums (Ultratop Flanders)	8
Belgian Alternative Albums (Ultratop Flanders)	6
Belgian Albums (Ultratop Wallonia)	5
Danish Albums (Hitlisten)	23
Dutch Albums (Album Top 100)	11
European Albums (Billboard)	4
French Albums (SNEP)	48
German Albums (Offizielle Top 100)	29
Italian Albums (FIMI)	20
Japanese Albums (Oricon)	97
Mexican Albums (Top 100 Mexico)	38
Spanish Albums (PROMUSICAE)	34
Swedish Albums (Sverigetopplistan)	50
Swedish Albums & Compilations (Sverigetopplistan)	58
Swiss Albums (Schweizer Hitparade)	12
UK Albums (OCC)	54
US Billboard 200	8

Chart (2006)	Position
Argentine Albums (CAPIF)	5
Mexican Albums (Top 100 Mexico)	77

=== Decade-end charts ===
Chart (2000–09)	Position
Australian Albums (ARIA)	71
UK Albums (OCC)	97
US Billboard 200	124

=== Weekly singles charts ===
Singles charts (weekly)
Year	Song	Peak						
Year	Song	IRE	AUS	BE (Wal)	CAN	UK	US	US Pop
2004	"Vertigo"	1	5	9	2	1	31	10
2005	"All Because of You"	4	23	36	1	4	—	—
2005	"Sometimes You Can't Make It on Your Own"	3	19	32	1	1	97	87
2005	"City of Blinding Lights"	8	31	23	2	2	—	—
"—" denotes a release that did not chart.

== Certifications ==
Region	Certification	Certified units/sales
Argentina (CAPIF)	3× Platinum	120,000^{^}
Australia (ARIA)	4× Platinum	280,000^{^}
Austria (IFPI Austria)	Platinum	30,000^{*}
Belgium (BRMA)	Platinum	50,000^{*}
Brazil (Pro-Música Brasil)	2× Platinum	250,000^{*}
Canada (Music Canada)	5× Platinum	500,000^{^}
Croatia (HDU)	Silver	
Denmark (IFPI Danmark)	4× Platinum	80,000^{‡}
Finland (Musiikkituottajat)	Gold	21,348
France (SNEP)	Platinum	300,000^{*}
Germany (BVMI)	3× Gold	300,000^{^}
Greece (IFPI Greece)	Platinum	20,000^{^}
Hungary (MAHASZ)	Gold	10,000^{^}
Ireland (IRMA)	10× Platinum	150,000^{^}
Japan (RIAJ)	Platinum	250,000^{^}
Mexico (AMPROFON)	Platinum	100,000^{^}
Netherlands (NVPI)	Gold	40,000^{^}
New Zealand (RMNZ)	3× Platinum	45,000^{^}
Poland (ZPAV)	Gold	20,000^{*}
Portugal (AFP)	3× Platinum	120,000^{^}
Russia (NFPF)	Gold	10,000^{*}
Spain (Promusicae)	2× Platinum	200,000^{^}
Sweden (GLF)	Platinum	60,000^{^}
United Kingdom (BPI)	4× Platinum	1,200,000^{^}
United States (RIAA)	3× Platinum	3,300,000
Summaries
Europe (IFPI)	3× Platinum	3,000,000^{*}
Worldwide	—	9,000,000
^{*} Sales figures based on certification alone.^{^} Shipments figures based on certification alone.^{‡} Sales+streaming figures based on certification alone.
