= U2.Communication =

U2.COMmunication

Live album by U2
- Released: November 2005
- Recorded: 9–10 May 2005, Chicago, Illinois and 20–21 July 2005, Milan, Italy
- Genre: Rock
- Length: 41:14
- Label: Island
- Producer: U2.COMmunication

U2 chronology
Live from Under the Brooklyn Bridge (2004)	U2.COMmunication (2005)	Vertigo 2005: Live from Chicago (2005)

U2.COMmunication is a live album recorded by U2 and released exclusively to members of its official website in 2005. The album features performances from two different concerts from the Vertigo Tour—a concert in Chicago, filmed for the Vertigo 2005: Live from Chicago video, and a concert in Milan filmed for the Vertigo 05: Live from Milan video which was released with deluxe copies of the compilation album, U218 Singles. The album's title is a play on U2.com, the band's website.

One of the highlights is an emotional performance of "Miss Sarajevo," dedicated to the victims of the July 2005 London bombings. Bono sings Luciano Pavarotti's aria in this performance.

The album also came with a bonus CD-ROM featuring wallpapers, screensavers, and a video performance of "Vertigo" from Milan. On November 20, 2006, the album was discontinued to release Zoo TV Live.

== Track listing ==
All tracks are written by U2, except "Miss Sarajevo" written by Passengers

No.	Title	Recorded	Length
1.	"City of Blinding Lights"	9 & 10 May 2005, Chicago, Illinois	6:39
2.	"Vertigo" / "Stories for Boys" (snippet)	9 & 10 May 2005, Chicago	4:42
3.	"Elevation"	9 & 10 May 2005, Chicago	4:34
4.	"I Still Haven't Found What I'm Looking For"	20 & 21 July 2005, Milan, Italy	4:05
5.	"Miracle Drug"	9 & 10 May 2005, Chicago	4:12
6.	"Miss Sarajevo"	20 & 21 July 2005, Milan	5:14
7.	"The Fly"	9 & 10 May 2005, Chicago	5:25
8.	"With or Without You"	20 & 21 July 2005, Milan	6:22
Total length:			41:14

== Personnel ==
- Bono – lead vocals, guitar on "The Fly"
- The Edge – guitar, keyboards, vocals
- Adam Clayton – bass guitar, keyboards
- Larry Mullen Jr. – drums, backing vocals on "Elevation" and "Miracle Drug"

== See also ==
- U2 discography
