= Daytrotter =

Former studio and music venue in Atlanta, US

- Website type: Music
- Available in: English
- Owner: Wolfgang's
- Website: daytrotter.com
- Launched: March 2006

Daytrotter was a recording studio, music venue and subscription-based music discovery website located in Atlanta, United States. It hosted recording sessions with indie music acts.

The original studio in Rock Island, Illinois, was founded in 2006 by Sean Moeller. It later moved to Davenport, Iowa and in 2019 moved to Atlanta, Georgia.

The sessions can be compared to that of a radio station's lounge recordings, where musicians passing through the town can record live in the studio. Given their tendency to offer an eclectic sampling of music as well as their production style the sessions have been compared to that of the Peel Sessions.

Currently, the Daytrotter website is owned by Paste. Sessions stopped being recorded in 2019 but returned in May 2026 with one session per week.

== Content ==
The site typically hosted around 60 songs by 17 bands per week. Almost all are available as downloads. From 2011 to 2018, access to streaming or downloading music from Daytrotter was by paid membership only but on March 1, 2018, Daytrotter returned to free streaming. There is an archives section of past performers, each illustrated by a staff of illustrators. In addition to music, there are sections of reviews and commentaries of musicians and their releases.

The site won the Nielsen Online and Billboard.com "Music Blog of the Year" (2007) award, and The Morning News 2007 Editor's Award for Online Excellence.

== Studio ==
The original studio in Rock Island, Illinois, was founded in 2006 by Sean Moeller. It later moved to Horseshack, in Davenport, Iowa. From 2011 through 2016 over 300 remote sessions were recorded in Austin, Texas by Danny Reisch at Good Danny's studio. In April 2019 it moved to Atlanta.

A minimalist recording process is used to record the visiting bands; the recording process is analog, with no editing, and no overdubbing.
