= A Man and a Woman (song) =

Song by U2

from the album How to Dismantle an Atomic Bomb
- Released: 23 November 2004
- Genre: Rock
- Length: 4:27
- Label: Island/Interscope
- Composer: U2
- Lyricist: Bono
- Producer: Jacknife Lee

"A Man and a Woman" is the seventh track on U2's eleventh studio album, How To Dismantle An Atomic Bomb. An acoustic version of the song showed up on the "All Because of You" single. It has been performed live only once, at the Clinton Foundation.

== Writing and composition ==
"I think it's a little gift of a song. It's like a jukebox gem."

— Bono on "A Man and a Woman".

"A Man and a Woman" emerged after U2's engineer was trying a mix of something the band had recorded. Lead singer Bono liked it and soon started to play the bass guitar and singing. The acoustic guitar that the Edge is playing in the song was taken from another completely different song, they chopped it up and connected together with the new one. It was inspiring to Bono to keep working on that. Bono cites Thin Lizzy founding member Phil Lynott as the influence for the style in which he sings the song.

Bono, who has been interested in the distance that lies between men and women, wrote this song about rediscovering a kind of flirtatious and romantic love. The Edge classes "A Man and a Woman" as the wild card on How to Dismantle an Atomic Bomb.

== Personnel ==
U2

- Bono – vocals
- The Edge – guitar, backing vocals, additional percussion
- Adam Clayton – bass guitar
- Larry Mullen, Jr. – drums, percussion

Additional performers

- Jacknife Lee – synthesizers

Technical

- Production – Jacknife Lee
- Additional production – Steve Lillywhite, Carl Glanville
- Recording – Glanville
- Recording assistance – Chris Heaney
- Mixing – Lee
- Mix engineering – Simon Gogerly, Greg Collins
