= One Step Closer (U2 song) =

Song by U2

from the album How to Dismantle an Atomic Bomb
- Released: 22 November 2004
- Recorded: 2003–2004
- Genre: Soft rock
- Length: 3:48
- Label: Island
- Composer: U2
- Lyricist: Bono
- Producers: Chris Thomas (orig.); Daniel Lanois (orig.); Jacknife Lee (add.)

"One Step Closer" is a song by Irish rock band U2, and is the ninth track on their 2004 studio album, How to Dismantle an Atomic Bomb.

The song has a slow tempo, with lead vocalist Bono's lyrics centered on traffic images. The origins of "One Step Closer" date back to the recording sessions for their 2000 album All That You Can't Leave Behind. It was revived for Atomic Bomb, with Lanois introducing a pedal steel guitar in addition to guitars from the Edge and Bono, and musical influences varying from country music to the Velvet Underground making themselves felt. One recording of the song ran for more than 15 minutes, with Bono adding many verses that were subsequently dropped. Producer Jacknife Lee also contributed to the final version of the recording.

"One Step Closer" is billed in the album with thanks to Noel Gallagher of Oasis. The title of the song comes from a conversation Bono had with Gallagher about Bono's dying father, Bob Hewson. Bono asked, "Do you think he believes in God?" to which Gallagher replied, "Well, he's one step closer to knowing." As with most U2 songs, however, multiple readings are available, with the singer's feeling of being lost, but still drifting towards some kind of understanding, possible at any age. Verdicts varied based on the listener: Bono biographer Mick Wall felt the song was "clearly linked" to Bono's father, and made for "painful if beautiful listening," Chicago Tribune reviewer Greg Kot did not make the same Bono connection and felt that Lanois' "foggy atmospherics" masked a lack of ideas, while Christianity Today saw it as a "sadly uncertain, yet hopeful" depiction of Bono's father having a crisis of faith.

The song has never been performed in concert by U2. It was rehearsed before the Innocence + Experience Tour in 2015, but was ultimately not performed at any show.

== Personnel ==
U2

- Bono – lead vocals, guitar
- The Edge – guitar, backing vocals
- Adam Clayton – bass guitar
- Larry Mullen Jr. – drums, percussion

Additional performers

- Daniel Lanois - additional guitar, pedal steel guitar
- Jacknife Lee – synthesisers

Production

- Chris Thomas – original production
- Daniel Lanois – original production
- Jacknife Lee – additional production, mixing
- Carl Glanville – recording
- Chris Heaney – recording assistance
