= Original of the Species =

- Cover for the promotional release

Promotional single by U2

from the album How to Dismantle an Atomic Bomb
- Released: November 2005
- Genre: Rock
- Length: 4:41 (album); 4:29 (edit)
- Label: Island / Interscope
- Composer: U2
- Lyricist: Bono
- Producer: Steve Lillywhite with additional production by Jacknife Lee

"Original of the Species" is a song by rock band U2 and the tenth track from their 2004 album, How to Dismantle an Atomic Bomb.

== Promotion ==
A live video clip of this song from the DVD Vertigo 2005: Live From Chicago is featured in a television commercial promoting the video capable Apple iPod. During that performance, Bono dedicates it to his two daughters. The image of Bono singing this song from the live recording in Chicago was used as the icon Apple used for the artist tab in the music app on their devices until 2015. Bono has also said he believes this to be the best song on How to Dismantle an Atomic Bomb. In concerts in December 2005, Bono has said the song is one of many influenced by John Lennon's music. The music video for the single utilised animated computer-generated imagery by Spontaneous, something unprecedented for U2 videos.

== Live performances ==
In concert form during the Vertigo Tour, the song was played with the Edge on piano, often accompanied by Bono on acoustic guitar. On rare occasions, it was played with the Edge on electric guitar, in a performance which was accompanied by a pianist and full orchestra, much similar to the performance of the album, and one of those performances was at their show in Milan, Italy in July 2005, which appeared on the Vertigo 05: Live from Milan bonus DVD for U2's 2006 compilation U218 Singles.

== Reception ==
The song was added to the playlists of thirteen alternative rock radio stations in the US. However, it failed to break the top 40, thus not charting on the Modern Rock Tracks chart. Instead it hovered around #60, rising to #55 in mid-January. However, it never gained enough airplay to enter the chart. It was slated for a UK release and was playlisted by Xfm London, Virgin Radio, and made the B-List of BBC Radio 2.

== Track listing ==
The U.S. promo was released in late 2005, while the U.K. promo was released in early 2006.

U.S. Promotional Single / Interscope INTR-11595-2
No.	Title	Length
1.	"Original of the Species" (album version)	4:41
Total length:		4:41

U.K. Promotional Single / Island U2PRO6
No.	Title	Length
1.	"Original of the Species" (single version)	4:29
Total length:		4:29

== Personnel ==
Personnel taken from How to Dismantle an Atomic Bomb CD booklet.

U2

- Bono – vocals, guitar
- The Edge – guitar, piano, synthesizer
- Adam Clayton – bass guitar
- Larry Mullen Jr. – drums, percussion

Additional personnel

- Steve Lillywhite – production
- Jacknife Lee – additional production, additional synthesizers
- Carl Gianville – recording
- Chris Heaney – recording assistance
- Flood – mixing
- Kieran Lynch – mix assistance

== Charts ==
Weekly chart performance for "Original of the Species"
Chart (2005–06)	Peak position
Belgium (Ultratip Bubbling Under Flanders)	13
Netherlands (Dutch Top 40)	15
Netherlands S2 (Dutch Charts)	15
US Adult Alternative Airplay (Billboard)	4

Year-end chart rankings for "Original of the Species"
Chart (2006)	Position
Netherlands (Dutch Top 40)	154

== Release history ==
Release dates and formats for "Original of the Species"
Region	Date	Format	Label	Ref.
United States	November 28, 2005	Hot AC radio	Interscope	
