= Yahweh (song) =

Song by U2

from the album How to Dismantle an Atomic Bomb
- Released: November 2004
- Genre: Rock
- Length: 4:22
- Label: Island / Interscope
- Songwriters: U2 (music); Bono and The Edge (lyrics)
- Producer: Chris Thomas

"Yahweh" is a song by rock band U2 and the eleventh track on their 2004 album How to Dismantle an Atomic Bomb. It was mainly recorded in one take, and was performed live by the band during the Vertigo Tour. The song received mixed reviews from critics.

== Writing and recording ==
"There's the sound, and then trying to figure out what that sound is - and it was this word, 'Yahweh'"

— Bono

"Yahweh" was written by U2 and recorded by How to Dismantle an Atomic Bomb producer Chris Thomas. Prior to the song's initial recording, the band's lead guitarist The Edge had the ideas for the music already planned. Lead vocalist Bono later added the vocals spontaneously during the song's first take. The original vocal take by Bono was so inspiring with "soaring and brilliant" melodies that it carried "Yahweh" in a dramatic new direction from what The Edge had previously envisioned. Moreover, most of what was recorded by the band and Chris Thomas during the initial take survived production. Subsequent recording attempts of "Yahweh" were made by two other producers for the album, Daniel Lanois and Steve Lillywhite, with Lanois even adding a mandolin in one take of the song. Ultimately however, the original Thomas recording of "Yahweh" was left mostly untouched.

During its first take, Bono came up with the "Yahweh line" almost immediately. Afterwards, the band decided that "it was one of those songs that had to be written". When talking about ideas for the song's theme Bono remarked, "I had this idea that no one can own Jerusalem, but everybody wants to put flags on it." he explained, "The title's an ancient name that's not meant to be spoken. I got around it by singing. I hope I don't offend anyone."

"Yahweh" (יהוה) is the name of the Judeo-Christian God in the Bible. The oldest Hebrew manuscripts present the name in the form of four consonants, commonly called the Tetragrammaton (from Greek te·tra-, meaning "four", and gram′ma, "letter"). These four letters (written from right to left) are יהוה, transliterated into English as YHWH or JHVH. "Jehovah" is the best known English pronunciation of the divine name, although "Yahweh" is favored by most Hebrew scholars. Some Jews avoid pronouncing the name "Yahweh".

Although, it is often believed that the name does not appear in the New Testament, the oldest fragments of the Greek Septuagint do contain the divine name in its Hebrew form. The Tetragrammaton was later replaced by "kyrios" in the Septuagint copies.

== Live performances ==
"Yahweh" was performed live by U2 during the Vertigo Tour. In May 2005, the band performed an acoustic version of the song live in Chicago at the United Center. This live version of "Yahweh" was later included as the twenty-second track on the band's concert film Vertigo 2005: Live from Chicago. The band also played the song live during the closing credits of their 2008 concert film U2 3D.

== Reception ==
"Yahweh" received mainly mixed reviews from critics, many of whom had different interpretations of the song. Christopher Gray of The Austin Chronicle called the song the "closing prayer" of the album and thought the song was ambiguous, saying that it "could be about Jesus or the two kids Bono and wife, Ali, have had since All That You Can't Leave Behind." Despite the song's religious message Anna Kaufman of the Daily Californian liked that the band does not seem to be preaching in the song. Writing that, "Rather, they seem to be offering up to God, to the world, to their fellow man - questions and concerns, hopes and dreams." Reviewer Justin Cober-Lake of PopMatters did not like the song saying "It's a shame that How to Dismantle an Atomic Bomb has to end with the dud of "Yahweh", because it's actually a quite good album." Cober-Lake also criticised the guitar composition of the song adding that "the main guitar part sounds as if The Edge wrote it in his sleep -- sticking close to the formula without livening it up."

== Personnel ==
Personnel taken from How to Dismantle an Atomic Bomb CD booklet.

U2

- Bono – lead vocals, additional guitar
- The Edge – guitar, piano, synthesizer, backing vocals
- Adam Clayton – bass guitar
- Larry Mullen Jr. – drums, percussion

Additional personnel

- Chris Thomas – production
- Carl Gianville – recording, mixing
- Chris Heaney – recording assistance
- Daniel Lanois – mandolin
