= Sean Moeller =

American businessman

- Occupations: Businessman, record company owner
- Label: Daytrotter

Sean Moeller is an American businessman who is the founder and former head of the music recording company/studio Daytrotter. Moeller used to be a writer for the Quad-City Times.

== Career ==
Moeller began working for the Quad-City Times when he was in high school, and worked there for a total of twelve years. After high school, Moeller left the Times for four years to attend college at the University of Iowa, where he ran cross country and track. In 2014, Moeller started "Moeller Mondays", where a surprise musical act or acts would play a set at Rozz-Tox in Rock Island, after recording a session. In late 2015, Moeller moved the Daytrotter studios from its Rock Island location to a space in downtown Davenport.

In August 2016, Moeller departed as head of Daytrotter, leaving himself with only a minority share in the company.
