= Michael Deeny =

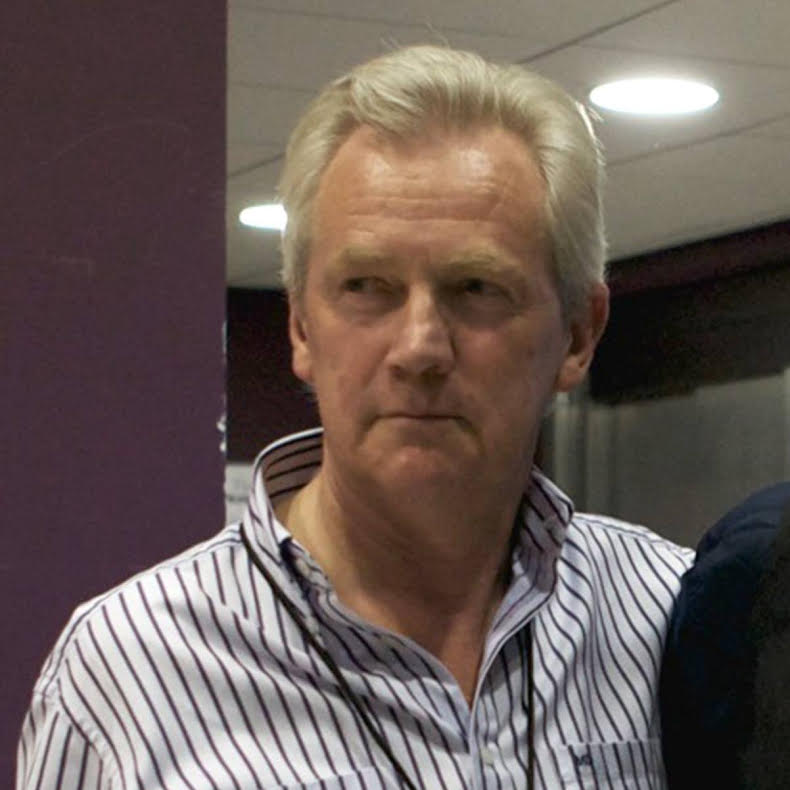
- Michael Deeny in Montpellier 2012
- Born: Michael Eunan McLarnon Deeny; 12 November 1944 (age 81); Lurgan, County Armagh, Northern Ireland
- Education: Clongowes Wood College; Magdalen College, Oxford
- Occupation: Concert promoter
- Spouse: Margaret Deeny (née Vereker) (m. 1975)
- Children: Leander Deeny, Camille Deeny, Isabel Deeny
- Parent(s): Dr Donnell McLarnon Deeny, Annie Deeny (née McGinley)

Michael Eunan McLarnon Deeny (born 12 November 1944) MA (Oxon) FCA, is a concert promoter and prominent Name of Lloyd's of London.

== Early life ==
The eldest son of a doctor, Michael Deeny was born in the small Northern Irish town of Lurgan.

Deeny was educated at Clongowes Wood College before graduating from Magdalen College, Oxford in History.

== Career ==
=== Entertainment Business ===
After leaving university, Deeny trained as a chartered accountant and worked at Chalmers Impey in the City of London before moving to the Irish company Kennedy's Bakeries.

Deeny worked as an accountant for three years before switching full-time to the music business. The transition began when, somewhat whimsically, Deeny and his friend Paul McGuinness persuaded the Scottish singer Donovan to come out of semi-retirement (and self-imposed exile) to play at the Royal Dublin Society.

Subsequently, Deeny organised a Royal Dublin Society festival with many prominent musicians of the time, including: The Crazy World of Arthur Brown, Manfred Mann's Earth Band, and the genre-defining Irish Celtic Rock band Horslips. Shortly afterwards, Deeny became Horslip's manager.

Deeny's strategy with the band was to move them from the Irish cabaret club circuit of the time, and into the more lucrative dance-halls. He also insisted the band should tour outside Ireland to increase their fan-base – even if that meant risking a short-term loss. Consequently, Horslips were one of the first Irish Bands to gain substantial success outside Ireland.

Beginning in the early 1980s, Deeny began to manage the English singer Murray Head, seeing him through the peak of his career with the album and musical Chess and the worldwide hit One Night in Bangkok.

He was also briefly the manager of Irish featherweight boxer Barry McGuigan.

==== Influence on U2's Management ====
It is widely acknowledged that Deeny's management of Horslips paved the way for the success of the Irish rock band U2. Nick Stewart, the man who signed U2 to Island Records, even went so far as to describe Michael Deeny as, "the godfather of Irish music".

Deeny's desire to break Horslips out of the Irish music scene and to a bigger audience had a strong influence on Paul McGuinness. In the book 'Unforgettable Fire: The Story of U2', journalist Eamon Dunphy claims that McGuinness expressed, "a desire to one day find his own 'baby band' and with them apply to rock 'n' roll the lessons Deeny had applied to folk-rock with Horslips".

Members of U2 also acknowledge Deeny's influence on their success. In their autobiography, 'U2 by U2', Bono comments that Deeny "really taught Paul McGuinness all he'd known...".

==== Concert Promotion ====
Deeny has continued to work as a concert promoter (mainly in France with business partner Gérard Drouot), working with high-profile acts including Pavarotti, U2, Bruce Springsteen, Nirvana, and The Eagles.

=== Lloyd's Name ===
Due to the turbulent nature of concert promotion –and the possibility of substantial financial losses– Deeny invested in becoming a member (a 'Name') of Lloyd's in 1985.

==== 1980s Problems ====
Shortly after Deeny became a Name, several serious problems emerged within Lloyd's, causing severe losses for many members (including Deeny himself). The total lost at Lloyd's between 1988 and 1992 was estimated to be £8 billion. This occurred for several reasons.

Due to the nature of Lloyd's business, it was often the case that a Name was liable to pay for claims made on policies established before they became members. This was because Names of Lloyd's were required to join groups called syndicates, which existed for one calendar year. Each syndicate was organised by a managing agent who hired underwriters to sell insurance to brokers. When a syndicate disbanded and estimated its profit or loss, it had to account for the fact that some claims might have been incurred but not reported that year. It also needed to account for the fact that many insurance policies are valid for longer than one year.

A syndicate would therefore make an estimate of the total losses that might be incurred from each policy in the future, and then buy reinsurance to cover these estimated future losses. Such reinsurance was often sold by other Lloyd's syndicates – often by the same syndicate who simply reformed in subsequent calendar years.

This practice seemed to work for many years until the 1980s when health claims due to asbestos and environmental damage started to emerge. It quickly became apparent to many Lloyd's syndicates that their predecessors had dramatically underestimated future claims, causing them significant losses.

Another problem that emerged around the same time was dubbed the LMX Spiral. It involved syndicates protecting themselves against huge losses by seeking reinsurance. For example, an insurer might sell a policy for an oil rig offering cover for any level of disaster, but would then seek to buy reinsurance for any claims over £10 million.

This was a common practice but was unregulated, permitting syndicates to reinsurance each other without keeping track of who exactly was liable. In an interview for the Telegraph, Deeny described the LMX spiral as follows:

The spiral involved incompetent underwriters who could not find enough normal decent insurance business so they ended up just reinsuring each other. The risks were going around and round in circles, the brokers involved were taking commission and the risk ended up being concentrated at a small number of syndicates at Lloyd's.

Consequently, many syndicates had considerably underestimated the funds they required to protect against claims, causing significant losses for many Names. And, since Lloyd's members had always operated with 'unlimited' liability (meaning all of their personal assets could be required to cover losses) some Names were forced into bankruptcy.

Deeny also cites 'time and distance' policies as creating misleading accounts. For 'Accountancy Magazine' he explained:

Under these policies, a large premium is paid and you are guaranteed back a fixed amount after a certain number of years. The difference between the premium and the eventual recovery is treated as a trading profit, which is not unreasonable, but it's paid in the year you take out the policy. The idea of taking a profit you won't earn for 10 years is appalling, and no-one every explained to the Names that this was going on.

==== Gooda Walker Action Group ====
Given his accountancy experience and that, "with concert promotion, you are effectively gambling on how many tickets an artiste sells," Deeny was one of the few non-working Names (members that did not actively participate in the business) who understood the nature of the failures within Lloyd's.

Consequently, Deeny quickly became a prominent figure in seeking compensation for the Names. His first major contribution was in the debate of who exactly to sue. The losses Deeny suffered resulted from the managing agent Gooda Walker. While many Names wished to sue Lloyd's itself, Deeny thought that "a much clearer route to securing compensation lay in suing the agents". As chair of the Gooda Walker Action Group's litigation subcommittee, Deeny successfully persuaded the group to take this course.

Deeny then became the action group's chairman in March 1993, repeatedly persuading the action group's members to decline offers of a settlement from Lloyd's, arguing that the compensation awarded through legal action could be much larger. Throughout this time, many considered Deeny to be "the most influential action group leader" who sought compensation.

==== Deeny vs. Gooda Walker ====
Deeny's efforts culminated in 'Deeny and Others vs Gooda Walker LTD and Others', the first and largest case of Names taking action against their syndicate's managing agent.

In October 1994 a judgement was delivered. Mr Justice Phillips agreed with the action group, remarking that:

...the fact that a Lloyd's name deliberately agreed to expose himself to unlimited liability did not mean that he anticipated or accepted that when he joined a syndicate the active underwriter would deliberately expose him to the risk of such liability. On the contrary, the name would reasonably expect the underwriter to exercise due skill and care to prevent him from suffering losses.

Wilde Sapte –the action group's litigators– analysed the 150-page judgement and estimated that the Names would be awarded £504 million in compensation. Before the proceedings, the Gooda Walker Action Group were offered 23% of the £900 million proposed by Lloyd's as an out-of-court settlement to litigating Names. This amounted to around an average settlement of £67,600 each to compensate an average loss of £189,000. Instead, the plaintiffs were awarded almost triple that – an average of £167,000 each.

Many newspapers reported that the case had 'made English legal history for involving the largest number of plaintiffs (3,062) and defendants (71). Consequently, it was the largest amount of damages awarded in the history of English courts.

The judgement set the precedent for groups of Names to sue and get judgements against their managing agents creating a litigation crisis within Lloyd's.

==== Lloyd's Settlement Offer ====
In 1994, the leading action groups elected Deeny as Chairman of the "Litigating Names' Committee". Subsequently, -and in light of the Deeny vs. Gooda Walker ruling- the committee negotiated a settlement agreement with Lloyd's, providing £3.2billion to those Names who had litigated and who had suffered severe losses on various syndicates. This offer was accepted by 95% of the Names at Lloyd's and led to the end of almost all the many lawsuits by Names relating to their losses.

==== Subsequent Lloyd's Roles ====
The great majority of Names resigned from Lloyd's in the 1990s and were replaced by corporate capital. It was even discussed within Lloyd's whether they should continue to allow Names to provide capital at all. However several thousand Names wished to continue underwriting and were represented by the Association of Lloyd's Members. Deeny was elected chairman of this organisation in 1999 (a position he held for 11 years) and led a successful campaign to maintain the rights of Names to continue at Lloyd's. As a result, some 2,000 Names still provide £2.7 million of capacity to the market.

Deeny is a Member of the Council of Lloyd's. He is also the Chairman of the Equitas Trust and a director of the various companies in the Equitas group. Equitas was established to be responsible for paying the outstanding £5 billion of liabilities from insurance policies issued by syndicates to which the Names belonged in the past.

== Anti-Apartheid Activism ==
During the 1969–70 South Africa rugby union tour of Britain and Ireland, Deeny was a member of the protest group "Stop the Seventy Tour". Organised by Peter Hain, the anti-apartheid campaigners aimed –through non-violent means– to disrupt the Springbok's tour of the British Isles. On 20 December 1969, with intent to delay the Sprinbok's match with England at Twickenham, Deeny hijacked the team's coach by pretending to be the driver.

Recalling the event for the 'Sunday Independent', journalist Sam Smyth explains how Deeny was selected for the job:

When the idea was mooted at an earlier anti-apartheid meeting, Deeny said if they wanted to get away with it, the hijacker should wear a conservative business suit and adopt an urbane manner. He was the only one there who fulfilled both the attitude and dress code requirements and reluctantly agreed to do it.

In a 2006 interview with John Inverdale for the Telegraph, Tommy Bedford, a South African team member from the tour (and fellow Oxford graduate), recalled the event:

Tommy Bedford was sitting on the coach with some of his team-mates when the guy got in the driver's seat. He looked like a driver because he had a cap on. He started the ignition and pulled away from the hotel in London's Park Lane. And then all hell broke loose. The police outriders had been caught by surprise. Half the team weren't even on the bus. And where on earth were they going? As they sped past Green Park underground station one of the players managed to get his hands round the driver's neck. The bus crashed into half a dozen cars. The police arrived. Chaos. The guy had tried to hijack the Springbok rugby team. And all this only four hours before kick-off.

Peter Hain recalled some further details in a 2012 memoir:

Michael Deeny, an STST activist who worked in the City, turned up in a smart suit, politely told the driver of the team's coach waiting outside their London hotel that he was wanted inside, slipped into his seat and chained himself to the steering wheel. The team restlessly paced around the hotel foyer as a long delay ensued while police eventually found a metal cutter, Deeny meanwhile having been subjected to a mauling.

== Margaret Kildysart Prank ==
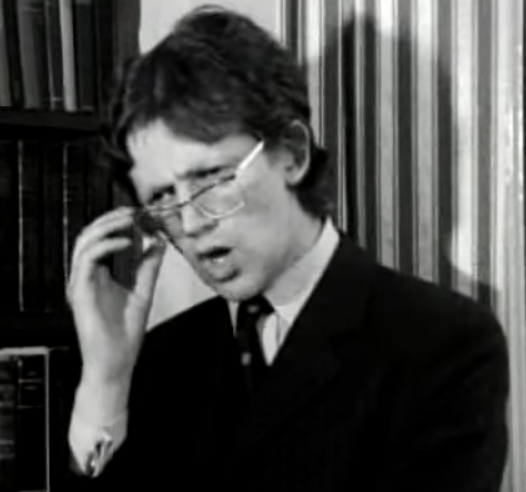
Michael Deeny in his role as Alistair Laidlaw for the RTÉ Irish TV April Fool's prank of 1971 entitled 'Margaret Kildysart, the Forgotten Lady Novelist of Loughrea'.

On 1 April 1971 Michael Deeny participated in an April Fool's prank that was broadcast on RTÉ, Ireland's only public service TV channel at the time. Purporting to detail the life of imaginary author Margaret Kildysart from Loughrea ("winner of the Irish Independent award for Tallest Lady Novelist of 1913"), Cathal O'Shannon presented a documentary for the regular programme 'Newsbeat'.

Deeny played the part of Alistair Laidlaw, the stammering academic, and also wrote the poem that Kildysart was claimed to have penned.

'Margaret Kildysart, the Forgotten Lady Novelist of Loughrea' was so convincing, the 15 minute spoof documentary led to a proposal for Loughrea town council to erect a memorial plaque in her honour. It was reported that some local townspeople even claimed to have known Kildysart personally.

To this day, Margaret Kildysart lives on as the mock-patron saint of the 'Baffle Poetry Society' based in Loughrea, and was the theme for their 2015 poetry competition.

== Personal life ==
Deeny married the psychiatrist Margaret Vereker in 1975. They have three children: Leander (b. 1980), Camille (b. 1983), and Isabel (b. 1985).

He is the brother of the Irish High Court judge, Donnell Deeny; and the brother of fashion journalist Godfrey Deeny. He is the father of author and actor Leander Deeny. His uncle was the public health pioneer Dr James Andrew Donnelly Deeny.

The broadcaster John Sergeant states in his autobiography that his "closest friend at Oxford was Michael Deeny".
