= All Because of You (U2 song) =

2005 single by U2

Single by U2

from the album How to Dismantle an Atomic Bomb
- B-side: "She's a Mystery to Me"
- Released: 8 February 2005
- Genre: Alternative rock
- Length: 3:34
- Label: Island, Interscope
- Composer: U2
- Lyricist: Bono
- Producer: Steve Lillywhite

U2 singles chronology
"Sometimes You Can't Make It on Your Own" (2005)	"All Because of You" (2005)	"City of Blinding Lights" (2005)

Music video
- "All Because of You" on YouTube

"All Because of You" is a song by Irish rock band U2. It is the sixth track on their eleventh studio album, How to Dismantle an Atomic Bomb (2004). The song was released as the album's second single in North America on 8 February 2005 and as the fourth single in other territories on 10 October 2005. The song was released for airplay in the United States concurrently with the album release date (the first single, "Vertigo", had been released prior to the album debut).

== Chart performance ==
The song debuted at number twenty-seven on the Billboard Modern Rock Tracks chart and went on to reach number six. It entered at 39 on the Billboard Mainstream Rock Tracks chart three weeks after its release and reached number 20. However, the single's airplay quickly diminished. The song achieved significantly less success than the second American single released from U2's previous two albums, both of which spent several months on the Billboard Hot 100.

"All Because of You" was released in the United Kingdom on 10 October 2005. It was added to Xfm London's playlist and BBC Radio 1's C-list, later moving to the B-list. The song finally made it to the A-list on 28 September. The song also made it onto BBC Radio 2's B-list. The song jumped to number ten on the airplay chart on 10 October, after lingering around number 50 for a month. "All Because of You" entered the singles chart at number four, but slipped out of the Top 40 just two weeks later. It also failed to chart in the UK download chart.

== Live performances ==
"All Because of You" was regularly performed early on in the Vertigo Tour, though as the tour progressed it missed a large number of shows. When it was performed it typically opened the second encore. Bono has introduced it live as "a love song to The Who", acknowledging The Who's obvious influence on the song's sound. He also plays the tambourine during the live performances of the song.

The song was eventually performed live again on the 2018 Experience + Innocence Tour, where it was regularly performed in the set's first act.

== Music video ==
The music video for this song was filmed in New York City. The band played aboard a flat bed truck riding around Manhattan, playing the song much to the surprise of many New Yorkers. U2's performance through New York took them from Manhattan to Brooklyn, where they would perform a surprise mini-concert.

== Formats and track listings ==
Version 1
No.	Title	Lyrics	Music	Length
1.	"All Because of You" (Single mix)	Bono	U2	3:19
2.	"She's a Mystery to Me" (Live in Brooklyn, New York City, New York)	Bono, The Edge	Bono, The Edge	2:42

Version 2
No.	Title	Lyrics	Music	Length
1.	"All Because of You" (Single mix)	Bono	U2	3:19
2.	"Miss Sarajevo" (Live at San Siro, Milan, Italy, 21 July 2005)	Bono	U2, Brian Eno	5:15
3.	"A Man and a Woman" (Acoustic version)	Bono	U2	4:27

Version 3
No.	Title	Lyrics	Music	Length
1.	"All Because of You" (Video)	Bono	U2	3:35
2.	"City of Blinding Lights" (Video)	Bono	U2	4:35
3.	"All Because of You" (Single mix)	Bono	U2	3:19

Note for Version 3: This was the DVD single to "All Because of You." The "Single Mix" to "All Because of You" was an audio track.

Version 4
No.	Title	Lyrics	Music	Length
1.	"All Because of You" (Album version)	Bono	U2	3:34
2.	"Fast Cars" (Jacknife Lee mix)	Bono, The Edge	U2	3:28

Note

- This was the Canada-only version of this single, released on 8 February 2005.

Version 5
No.	Title	Lyrics	Music	Length
1.	"All Because of You" (Live in Chicago, Illinois)	Bono	U2	3:35
2.	"Fast Cars" (Jacknife Lee mix)	Bono, The Edge	U2	3:28

Note

- This was the Digital download release, released on 10 October 2005.

== Personnel ==
Personnel taken from How to Dismantle an Atomic Bomb CD booklet.

U2

- Bono – lead vocals
- The Edge – guitar, backing vocals
- Adam Clayton – bass guitar
- Larry Mullen Jr. – drums, percussion

Additional personnel

- Steve Lillywhite – production
- Carl Gianville – recording
- Chris Heaney – recording assistance
- Flood – mixing
- Kieran Lynch – mix assistance
- Jacknife Lee – keyboards

== Charts ==
=== Weekly charts ===
Chart (2005)	Peak position
Australia (ARIA)	23
Austria (Ö3 Austria Top 40)	37
Belgium (Ultratop 50 Flanders)	27
Belgium (Ultratop 50 Wallonia)	36
Canada (Nielsen SoundScan)	1
Canada Rock Top 30 (Radio & Records)	1
Denmark (Tracklisten)	5
Europe (Eurochart Hot 100)	13
Germany (GfK)	37
Greece (IFPI)	20
Ireland (IRMA)	4
Italy (FIMI)	2
Netherlands (Dutch Top 40)	6
Netherlands (Single Top 100)	4
Norway (VG-lista)	13
Spain (Promusicae)	2
Sweden (Sverigetopplistan)	37
UK Singles (Official Charts)	4
US Adult Alternative Airplay (Billboard)	1
US Alternative Airplay (Billboard)	6
US Bubbling Under Hot 100 (Billboard)	1
US Mainstream Rock Airplay (Billboard)	20

=== Year-end charts ===
Chart (2005)	Position
Netherlands (Dutch Top 40)	89
Netherlands (Single Top 100)	52
US Modern Rock Tracks (Billboard)	49
US Triple-A (Billboard)	15
Venezuela (Record Report)	15

== Release history ==
Region	Date	Format(s)	Label(s)	Ref(s).
United States	29 November 2004	Triple A; alternative radio	Interscope	
United States	3 January 2005	Mainstream rock; active rock radio	Interscope	
Canada	8 February 2005	CD	Island	
United Kingdom	10 October 2005	CD	Island	
Japan	26 October 2005	CD; DVD	Island	
