= Sometimes You Can't Make It on Your Own =

2005 single by U2

Single by U2

from the album How to Dismantle an Atomic Bomb
- B-side: "Ave Maria"
- Released: 7 February 2005
- Studio: Hanover Quay (Dublin, Ireland); South of France
- Genre: Rock
- Length: 5:06 (album version); 4:51 (edited version); 5:30 (alternate version)
- Label: Island; Interscope
- Composer: U2
- Lyricist: Bono
- Producers: Chris Thomas; Steve Lillywhite; Nellee Hooper

U2 singles chronology
"Vertigo" (2004)	"Sometimes You Can't Make It on Your Own" (2005)	"All Because of You" (2005)

Audio sample
- file; help

Music video
- "Sometimes You Can't Make It on Your Own" on YouTube

"Sometimes You Can't Make It on Your Own" is a song by Irish rock band U2. It is the third track on their eleventh studio album, How to Dismantle an Atomic Bomb (2004), and was released as the album's second single worldwide except in North America on 7 February 2005. Originally titled "Tough", the song is lyrically about the relationship between the band's lead vocalist Bono and his father Bob Hewson, who died of cancer in 2001.

It debuted at number one on the UK Singles Chart becoming the band's sixth number-one single in the United Kingdom. It also topped the charts in Canada, Scotland and Spain, and reached the top 10 in Denmark, Ireland, Italy, the Netherlands and Norway. The song won two Grammy Awards at the 48th Annual Grammy Awards ceremony in 2006: Best Rock Performance by a Duo or Group with Vocal and Song of the Year.

== Background and writing ==
Lead vocalist Bono and guitarist the Edge first began working on the song during U2's 1997–1998 PopMart Tour. During the recording of U2's 2000 album All That You Can't Leave Behind, Bono was aware that his father, Bob Hewson, was in the terminal stages of a bout with cancer. At that point, the song had the working title of "Tough", as that was the impression Bono always had of his father; he called him: "A tough old boot of a guy. Irish, Dub, north side Dubliner, very cynical about the world and the people in it, but very charming and funny with it." The Edge said that when the band played the song together, "it was a bit cloying". Bassist Adam Clayton said the song in its original form "had a very traditional feel", and that the group spent extensive time trying to change "the harmonic content" while still "retaining the strong melodies". The band subsequently decided not to release the song on All That You Can't Leave Behind. After Bob died in 2001, Bono sang a version of the song at his funeral.

During the recording of U2's following album How to Dismantle an Atomic Bomb, they revisited the song. The group continued to struggle with it, as the Edge felt the chord sequence was too obvious. Producer Daniel Lanois aided the band with the beginning of the song. At Bono's suggestion, the bass in the verses was dropped a tone before the relative minor, a change the band believed had been a breakthrough. After what Clayton estimated to be about the third or fourth rewrite of the song, producer Steve Lillywhite listened to it with Bono and the Edge. He critiqued the track, telling them that it did not have a chorus and that each verse simply was followed by the line "sometimes you can't make it on your own". Lillywhite thought that the track needed "a bridge to lift it to the chorus line". Bono then asked for a guitar to play and spontaneously, in falsetto, sang the lines "And it's you when I look na na na na / And it's you du du du du du du du / Sometimes you can't make it on your own". Even though Bono had not yet written the rest of the lyrics for this new segment, Lillywhite said: "all of a sudden the song was finished. That song had been around for the best part of five years and no one had ever said to them that it didn't have a chorus." Bono recorded his vocals in a single take during a visit by Interscope Records chairman Jimmy Iovine to the studio.

== Release ==
"Sometimes You Can't Make It on Your Own" was released in the United Kingdom on 7 February 2005 and in Australia the following week. In the former country, the song was added to BBC Radio 1's C-list playlist on 29 December 2004. It moved to the B-list a week later and to the A-list a week after that. In the United States, the song was added to several radio formats between February and March. In Canada, the song was released on 22 March 2005, a month after "All Because of You" was issued there.

== Chart performance ==
The song debuted at number one in the UK, marking the first time that a U2 album has produced two UK number 1 hits (following "Vertigo" in November 2004).

The single was also the third release in the United States. It reached number 15 on the Adult Top 40 chart, and number 29 on the Modern Rock Tracks chart in April 2005. It also reached number 97 on the Billboard Hot 100.

== Formats and track listings ==
CD (2 track)
No.	Title	Lyrics	Music	Length
1.	"Sometimes You Can't Make It on Your Own" (Radio edit 96 BPM)	Bono	U2	4:51
2.	"Fast Cars" (Jacknife Lee mix)	Bono, the Edge	U2	3:28

CD (maxi)
No.	Title	Lyrics	Music	Length
1.	"Sometimes You Can't Make It on Your Own" (Radio edit 96 BPM)	Bono	U2	4:51
2.	"Ave Maria" (Jacknife Lee mix)	Bono (English lyrics)	Franz Schubert	3:28
3.	"Vertigo" (Redanka Power mix)	Bono, the Edge	U2	7:34

CD (Japan release)
No.	Title	Lyrics	Music	Length
1.	"Sometimes You Can't Make It on Your Own" (Radio edit 96 BPM)	Bono	U2	4:51
2.	"Fast Cars" (Jacknife Lee mix)	Bono, the Edge	U2	3:28
3.	"Vertigo" (Trent Reznor remix)	Bono, the Edge	U2	3:38
4.	"Vertigo" (Redanka Power mix)	Bono, the Edge	U2	7:34
5.	"Ave Maria" (Jacknife Lee mix)	Bono (English lyrics)	Franz Schubert	3:35

DVD single
No.	Title	Length
1.	"Sometimes You Can't Make It on Your Own" (Video – Live from HQ video, 16 November 2004)	5:15
2.	"Vertigo" (Video)	3:11
3.	"Sometimes You Can't Make It on Your Own" (Album version)	5:05
4.	"Vertigo" (Trent Reznor remix)	3:38

== Personnel ==
Personnel taken from How to Dismantle an Atomic Bomb CD booklet.

U2

- Bono – lead vocals
- The Edge – guitar, keyboards, additional vocals
- Adam Clayton – bass guitar
- Larry Mullen Jr. – drums, percussion

Additional personnel

- Chris Thomas – production
- Steve Lillywhite – additional production
- Nellee Hooper – additional production, mixing
- Carl Gianville – recording
- Chris Heaney – recording assistance
- Simon Gogerly – mix engineering
- Greg Collins – mix engineering
- Simon Osbourne – additional mix engineering
- Ian Rossiter – assistant mix engineering
- Fabien Waltmann – programming

== Charts ==
=== Weekly charts ===
Chart (2005–2006)	Peak position
Australia (ARIA)	19
Austria (Ö3 Austria Top 40)	25
Belgium (Ultratop 50 Flanders)	31
Belgium (Ultratop 50 Wallonia)	32
Canada (Nielsen SoundScan)	1
Canada AC Top 30 (Radio & Records)	21
Canada Hot AC Top 30 (Radio & Records)	4
Canada Rock Top 30 (Radio & Records)	10
Denmark (Tracklisten)	2
Europe (Eurochart Hot 100)	4
Finland (Suomen virallinen lista)	11
France (SNEP)	60
Germany (GfK)	23
Hungary (Rádiós Top 40)	29
Hungary (Single Top 40)	3
Ireland (IRMA)	3
Italy (FIMI)	2
Netherlands (Dutch Top 40)	4
Netherlands (Single Top 100)	5
New Zealand (Recorded Music NZ)	12
Norway (VG-lista)	6
Scotland Singles (OCC)	1
Spain (Promusicae)	1
Sweden (Sverigetopplistan)	24
Switzerland (Schweizer Hitparade)	39
UK Singles (OCC)	1
US Billboard Hot 100	97
US Adult Alternative Airplay (Billboard)	1
US Adult Pop Airplay (Billboard)	15
US Alternative Airplay (Billboard)	29
US Pop 100 (Billboard)	87

=== Year-end charts ===
Chart (2005)	Position
Italy (FIMI)	31
Netherlands (Dutch Top 40)	8
Spain (PROMUSICAE)	10
UK Singles (OCC)	76
US Triple-A (Billboard)	5

== Certifications ==
Region	Certification	Certified units/sales
United Kingdom (BPI)	Silver	200,000^{‡}
^{‡} Sales+streaming figures based on certification alone.

== Release history ==
Region	Date	Format(s)	Label(s)	Ref.
United Kingdom	7 February 2005	CD; DVD	Island	
Australia	14 February 2005	CD	Island	
United States	14 February 2005	Hot adult contemporary radio	Interscope	
Japan	16 February 2005	CD	Island	
United States	22 February 2005	Alternative radio	Interscope	
United States	7 March 2005	Mainstream rock; active rock radio	Interscope	
Canada	22 March 2005	CD	Island	
United States	28 March 2005	Contemporary hit radio	Interscope	
Japan	6 April 2005	DVD	Island	

== See also ==
- List of covers of U2 songs – Sometimes You Can't Make It on Your Own
- List of number-one singles of 2005 (Canada)
- List of number-one singles of 2005 (Spain)
- 2005 in British music charts
