= Miracle Drug =

Song by U2

from the album How to Dismantle an Atomic Bomb
- Released: 23 November 2004
- Studio: Hanover Quay Studios, Dublin
- Genre: Rock
- Length: 3:54
- Label: Island Records
- Composer: U2
- Lyricists: Bono, The Edge
- Producer: Steve Lillywhite

"Miracle Drug" is a song by Irish rock band U2, and is the second track on their 2004 album How to Dismantle an Atomic Bomb. The song's lyrics were written by lead vocalist Bono about a former schoolmate Christopher Nolan, who was paralysed from birth but through a medical breakthrough learned to communicate via a pointer attached to his forehead and eventually wrote several books.

== Composition ==
"Miracle Drug" was written about the late Irish writer Christopher Nolan, with whom the band attended Mount Temple Comprehensive School. Bono said of Nolan:

We all went to the same school and just as we were leaving, a fellow called Christopher Nolan arrived. He had been deprived of oxygen for two hours when he was born, so he was paraplegic [sic]. But his mother believed he could understand what was going on and used to teach him at home. Eventually, they discovered a drug that allowed him to move one muscle in his neck. So they attached this unicorn device to his forehead and he learned to type. And out of him came all these poems that he'd been storing up in his head. Then he put out a collection called Dam-Burst of Dreams, which won a load of awards and he went off to university and became a genius. All because of a mother's love and a medical breakthrough.

== Live performances ==
"Miracle Drug" was played live at every show of the first and second legs of the Vertigo Tour, with Bono using the song (and the story of Nolan) as a means of expressing his appreciation for doctors, nurses, and others in the medical field. Its last performance on the Vertigo Tour was 28 November 2005 in Montreal.

The song made a brief return to the live stage in a new, reworked format on the first leg of U2's Innocence + Experience Tour. It opened the first encore in what was meant to be a rotational spot with "City of Blinding Lights".

== Personnel ==
Personnel taken from How to Dismantle an Atomic Bomb CD booklet.

U2

- Bono – lead and backing vocals, additional guitar
- The Edge – guitar, piano, additional vocals
- Adam Clayton – bass guitar
- Larry Mullen Jr. – drums, percussion, backing vocals

Additional performers

- Jacknife Lee – synthesizers, programming
- Carl Glanville – additional percussion and synthesizers

Technical personnel

- Steve Lillywhite – production, mixing
- Carl Gianville – additional production, recording, mixing
- Jacknife Lee – additional production
- Chris Heaney – recording assistance
