= Vertigo (U2 song) =

2004 single by U2

Single by U2

from the album How to Dismantle an Atomic Bomb
- B-side: "Are You Gonna Wait Forever?"; "Neon Lights"
- Released: 8 November 2004
- Studio: Hanover Quay (Dublin, Ireland); South of France
- Genre: Alternative rock
- Length: 3:11
- Label: Island; Interscope
- Composer: U2
- Lyricists: Bono; the Edge
- Producer: Steve Lillywhite

U2 singles chronology
"Take Me to the Clouds Above" (2004)	"Vertigo" (2004)	"Sometimes You Can't Make It on Your Own" (2005)

Music video
- "Vertigo" on YouTube

Audio sample
- "Vertigo": file; help

"Vertigo" is a song by the Irish rock band U2. It is the opening track on their eleventh studio album, How to Dismantle an Atomic Bomb (2004), and was released as the album's lead single on 8 November 2004. It received extensive airplay and in its first week sold more than 30,000 copies. The song was an international success, bolstered by its usage in a television advertisement featuring the band for Apple's iPod digital music player. The song lent its name to the band's 2005–2006 Vertigo Tour.

Commercially, "Vertigo" topped the charts in Denmark, Greece, Ireland, Italy, Spain and the United Kingdom while reaching the top 10 in Australia, Austria, Belgium, Canada, Finland, Hungary, the Netherlands, New Zealand, Norway, Sweden and Switzerland. "Vertigo" won three Grammy Awards for Best Rock Performance by a Duo or Group with Vocal, Best Rock Song, and Best Short Form Music Video at the 47th Annual Grammy Awards ceremony in 2005. "Vertigo" was ranked 64th on Rolling Stone's list of the 100 Best Songs of the Decade (2000 to 2010).

== Writing and recording ==
"Vertigo" originated from a demo that guitarist the Edge composed at his home in Malibu on a "very simple Pro-Tools rig". Playing along to drum loops that drummer Larry Mullen Jr. had recorded for him, the Edge created the guitar riff among others while "exploring rock 'n' roll guitar" and "what that means in the twenty-first century". Inspiration for the riff came within 20 minutes of the Edge first plugging into a 1957 Fender Deluxe amplifier, which was acquired for him by his technician Dallas Schoo after he requested a small amplifier he could use to record demos at his home studio. The Edge gave the demo a working title of "Full Metal Jacket". When lead singer Bono heard it, he was very enthused, describing it as: "the mother of all rock 'n' roll tunes. I don't know where it came from but it's a remarkable guitar thing. You want to hear it – it's a reason to make a record. The song is that good!"

Believing that their pending record would have a punk rock energy and be very collaborative between the band members, U2 hired Chris Thomas to produce it. The Edge said that Thomas worked well with bands and had produced several records that were favourites among U2, including early Roxy Music albums and the Sex Pistols's Never Mind the Bollocks, Here's the Sex Pistols. U2 began working with Thomas on the album How to Dismantle an Atomic Bomb in February 2003. During the sessions, U2 experimented with different melodies and rhythm ideas for "Full Metal Jacket". Bono's original set of lyrics was inspired by Leonard Peltier, a Native American rights activist who was controversially convicted of killing two Federal Bureau of Investigation agents. Bono did not believe Peltier deserved to be imprisoned, and he took a "new-journalism approach" to writing the lyrics. The song was subsequently retitled "Native Son", and after extensive experimentation on it, the band recorded and mixed a version of the song to completion with Thomas. The group were so excited by the song, they sent it to Interscope Records, which was equally excited by it. However, Bono called the decision a mistake and said the song ultimately "wasn't as good as [they] thought".

After working for nine months with Thomas, U2 had recorded an album's worth of material, but they were dissatisfied with the quality of it and decided to delay the release. As a result, they hired producer Steve Lillywhite to replace Thomas in January 2004. Lillywhite urged the band to record in the larger space at Hanover Quay Studio to encourage better performances. While Bono was away for the week, the band re-recorded the backing track for "Native Son". When Bono returned, Lillywhite asked him to record a guide vocal, but 30 seconds into a take, Bono stopped, as he became uncomfortable with the thought of singing the lyrics to a large crowd in a live setting. He said: "The lyrics were about something I care deeply about, but the song didn't vibrate. It didn't change the room temperature." The song subsequently was deconstructed and the lyrics were changed around, with various iterations of the song being called "Shark Soup" and "Viva la Ramone". At one point, Bono wrote a completely new set of lyrics in Spanish, remnants of which would survive in the completed version of the song. Eventually, the song transformed into "Vertigo", but the group were still considering several possible variations of the chorus. At the suggestion of some outsiders, the band chose the "Hello, hello" version. Lillywhite also double tracked Bono's vocals in the chorus to give them more impact. The Edge said the vocal melody in the final version of the song differed from his original demo, but that otherwise most of the musical ideas from the demo were present in the completed song.

The Edge achieved the guitar tones on the song using four pieces of equipment: a 1966 Fender Telecaster guitar, a Line 6 DM4 Distortion Modeler effects pedal, a Korg SDD-3000 digital delay pedal, and the Fender Deluxe amplifier. The distortion pedal is used for the raw sound of the main power chord riff, while the delay pedal is used for the clean, ambient accent notes in the song's instrumental break.

== Composition ==
At the beginning of the song, Bono counts off in Spanish "Unos, dos, tres, catorce!" In English, this translates to "some, two, three, fourteen!" When asked about this oddity in an interview for Rolling Stone, Bono replied "there may have been some alcohol involved". The count off was parodied by novelty singer Richard Cheese on his version of U2's "Sunday Bloody Sunday" on his 2005 album Aperitif for Destruction.

A Spanish reply of "¡Hola!" is also heard behind the "Hello, hello" of the refrain, as well as "¿Dónde está?" ("Where is it?" or "Where are you?" depending upon if this is intended as a question to the location of Vertigo or Bono himself) after the line "I'm at a place called Vertigo". The "Hello, hello" line itself is reminiscent of similar lyrics in the song "Stories for Boys" from U2's debut album Boy; in Vertigo Tour concerts, the band frequently included a section of the latter song in their performances of "Vertigo."

== Promotion ==
U2 performed "Vertigo" in a television commercial for the Apple iPod as part of a cross-marketing plan to promote both the album and Apple's music products (especially the U2 Special Edition iPod and the iTunes Music Store's exclusive digital box set for U2, The Complete U2).

== Live performances ==
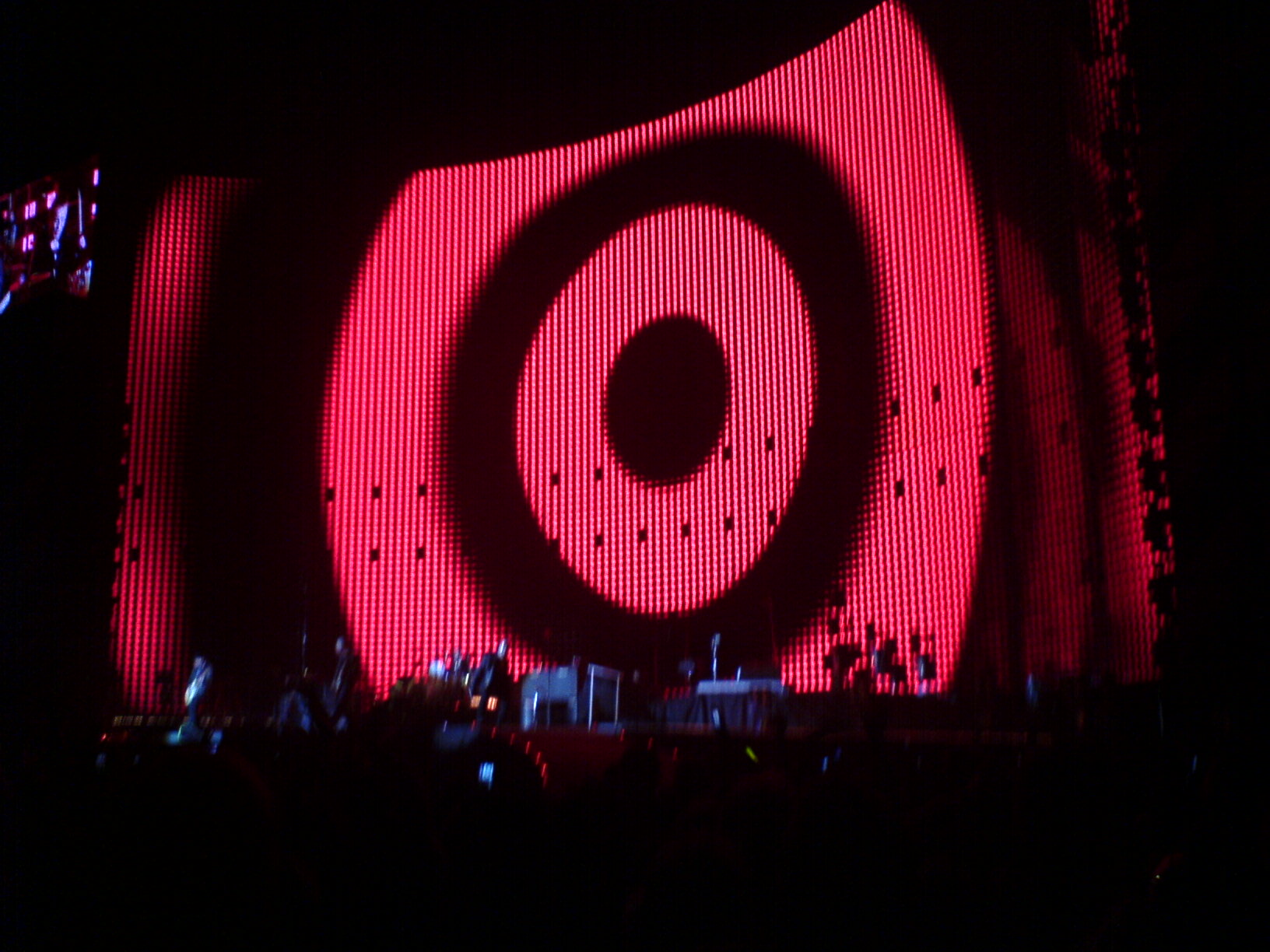
U2 performing "Vertigo" as part of their Vertigo Tour during a concert in Adelaide, Australia

U2 performed "Vertigo" at a number of promotional appearances in 2004 and early 2005, prior to the song's tour debut on the opening night of the Vertigo Tour. Since the first date of the Vertigo Tour, the band has virtually performed "Vertigo" at every single full tour concert, the only exceptions being the first few concerts of The Joshua Tree Tour 2017. On the Vertigo Tour during the North American arena legs as well as the 2006 stadium legs, "Vertigo" was typically the second song played after "City of Blinding Lights". For the European stadium leg, as well as a handful of other shows on the other legs, "Vertigo" opened the show. Many performances on this leg as well as occasional shows on the other legs sometimes featured "Vertigo" played twice, once early in the show and again as a final encore; this also looks back to U2's early days, when they did not have enough songs to fill out an entire performance and had to repeat some at the end. Performances on this tour typically featured an extended outro to the song, which included a repeat of Bono's "Yeah, Yeah" lines. Visuals on this tour were inspired by the album cover, with heavy use of red and yellow lighting and the 'Vertigo target' artwork from the CD.

For the U2 360° Tour the song was typically performed midway through the main set, again after "City Of Blinding Lights". It was one of the only songs to use the fully retracted pantograph video screen. For the Innocence & Experience Tour it was typically the third song played, with a swinging lightbulb hanging overhead during the performance. On The Joshua Tree Tour 2017 and 2019, the song was typically performed in the encore following "Elevation", this tour marked a return of the extended outro and the same visuals as on the Vertigo Tour. On the Experience + Innocence Tour the song was played as part of the "e-Stage" section, again following "Elevation" and featuring the extended outro. Bono would perform this song in his "MacPhisto" character.

== Use in the media ==
The Redanka Power remix of the song was used as bumper music for the Nine Network's Friday night AFL coverage in 2006.

== Chart performance ==
Upon release, "Vertigo" debuted at number 18 on Billboard's Modern Rock Tracks chart and number 46 on the Billboard Hot 100. In the following weeks, the track jumped to number one on the Modern Rock Tracks chart, moved from number 27 to number three on the Mainstream Rock Tracks chart, and from number 35 to number nine on the Adult Top 40. It also debuted at number one on the Hot Digital Tracks chart and, after falling to number 4, returned to the top position. The track later moved into the top 40 of the Billboard Hot 100, peaking at number 31. It spent 20 weeks on the chart.

In the United Kingdom, the song moved from BBC Radio 1's B-list in the first week of its airplay release to the A-list in the second week. The song was released commercially on 15 November, and debuted at number one on the UK Singles Chart, and remained there for one week. In total, it spent nine weeks in the top 40. In Australia, the track debuted at number five on the ARIA Singles Chart and was ranked number 38 on Triple J's Hottest 100 of 2004. In the Netherlands, "Vertigo" reached number two on the Mega Top 100. In Brazil, the single went gold with more than 50,000 downloads. The digital single holds a Gold status in the United States.

== Music video ==
The video for the song features U2 performing in a featureless desert as black jet streams emit from behind each band member; on the ground is a huge white bulls-eye symbol used as a motif for the album graphics. The circular platform that the band performs on constantly elevates up and down in a spiral pattern, as the wind blows in the band's face. It was directed by the team of Alex & Martin and produced by Partizan. It was recorded in Punta Del Fangar (Ebro Delta) in Spain and won a Grammy Award for Best Short Form Music Video at the 47th Annual Grammy Awards in 2005.

== Cover versions ==
Nathaniel Willemse released a cover version of "Vertigo" as his debut single in 2008, after having performed it on Australian Idol series four in 2006. Bon Jovi performed a snippet of the song during "Bad Medicine" on Bon Jovi Live, their 2011 tour.

== Formats and track listings ==
=== 7-inch and 12-inch vinyl singles ===
US 7-inch single
No.	Title	Length
1.	"Vertigo"	3:14

UK 12-inch single 1
No.	Title	Length
1.	"Vertigo" (Jacknife Lee 12-inch)	5:36
2.	"Vertigo" (Jacknife Lee 7-inch)	3:08
3.	"Vertigo" (Jacknife Lee 10-inch)	4:13
4.	"Vertigo" (Jacknife Lee 12-inch instrumental)	5:36

UK 12-inch single 2
No.	Title	Length
1.	"Vertigo" (Redanka Power mix)	7:32
2.	"Vertigo" (Trent Reznor remix)	3:38

=== CD and DVD singles ===
CD 1 / Mini CD
No.	Title	Length
1.	"Vertigo"	3:11
2.	"Are You Gonna Wait Forever?"	3:48

CD 2
No.	Title	Length
1.	"Vertigo"	3:11
2.	"Vertigo" (Jacknife Lee 10-inch)	4:13
3.	"Neon Lights"	4:07

Japan CD
No.	Title	Length
1.	"Vertigo"	3:11
2.	"Are You Gonna Wait Forever?"	3:48
3.	"Vertigo" (Jacknife Lee 10-inch)	4:13
4.	"Neon Lights"	4:07
5.	"Vertigo" (Live at HQ video)	3:11

DVD
No.	Title	Length
1.	"Vertigo" (HQ video)	3:11
2.	"Vertigo" (Audio with photo gallery)	4:13
3.	"Are You Gonna Wait Forever?" (Audio only)
4.	"Vertigo" (Jacknife Lee 10-inch – Lisbon video)

== Personnel ==
Personnel taken from How to Dismantle an Atomic Bomb CD booklet.

U2

- Bono – lead vocals
- The Edge – guitar, backing vocals
- Adam Clayton – bass guitar
- Larry Mullen Jr. – drums

Additional personnel

- Steve Lillywhite – production, mixing
- Carl Gianville – recording, mixing
- Chris Heaney – recording assistance
- Jacknife Lee – synthesizers

== Charts ==
=== Weekly charts ===
Weekly chart performance for "Vertigo"
Chart (2004–2006)	Peak position
Australia (ARIA)	5
Austria (Ö3 Austria Top 40)	4
Belgium (Ultratop 50 Flanders)	16
Belgium (Ultratop 50 Wallonia)	9
Canada (Nielsen BDS)	1
Canada (Nielsen SoundScan)	2
Canada CHR/Pop Top 30 (Radio & Records)	11
Canada Hot AC Top 30 (Radio & Records)	1
Canada Rock Top 30 (Radio & Records)	1
Denmark (Tracklisten)	1
Europe (Eurochart Hot 100)	2
Finland (Suomen virallinen lista)	2
France (SNEP)	12
Germany (GfK)	9
Greece (IFPI)	1
Hungary (Rádiós Top 40)	5
Ireland (IRMA)	1
Italy (FIMI)	1
Netherlands (Dutch Top 40)	2
Netherlands (Single Top 100)	2
New Zealand (Recorded Music NZ)	5
Norway (VG-lista)	2
Romania (Romanian Top 100)	82
Scottish Singles Sales (Official Charts)	1
Spain (Promusicae)	1
Sweden (Sverigetopplistan)	2
Switzerland (Schweizer Hitparade)	6
UK Singles (Official Charts)	1
US Billboard Hot 100	31
US Adult Alternative Airplay (Billboard)	1
US Adult Pop Airplay (Billboard)	9
US Alternative Airplay (Billboard)	1
US Dance Club Songs (Billboard)	8
US Mainstream Rock (Billboard)	3
US Pop Airplay (Billboard)	35
US Pop 100 (Billboard)	10
US Top 40 Tracks (Billboard)	37

=== Year-end charts ===
2004 year-end chart performance for "Vertigo"
Chart (2004)	Position
Brazil (Crowley)	64
Hungary (Rádiós Top 40)	91
Italy (FIMI)	14
Netherlands (Dutch Top 40)	87
Netherlands (Single Top 100)	39
UK Singles (OCC)	44
US Adult Top 40 (Billboard)	63
US Modern Rock Tracks (Billboard)	53
US Triple-A (Billboard)	33

2005 year-end chart performance for "Vertigo"
Chart (2005)	Position
Brazil (Crowley)	79
Hungary (Rádiós Top 40)	60
US Adult Top 40 (Billboard)	25
US Mainstream Rock Tracks (Billboard)	38
US Modern Rock Tracks (Billboard)	50
US Triple-A (Billboard)	38

== Certifications ==
Certifications and sales for "Vertigo"
Region	Certification	Certified units/sales
Australia (ARIA)	Platinum	70,000^{‡}
Brazil (Pro-Música Brasil) Digital	Gold	30,000^{‡}
Brazil (Pro-Música Brasil) DMS	Gold	30,000^{*}
New Zealand (RMNZ)	Gold	15,000^{‡}
United Kingdom (BPI)	Gold	400,000^{‡}
United States (RIAA)	Gold	500,000^{*}
^{*} Sales figures based on certification alone.^{‡} Sales+streaming figures based on certification alone.

== Release history ==
Release dates for "Vertigo"
Region	Date	Format(s)	Label(s)	Ref.
United States	4 October 2004	Hot AC; triple A; mainstream rock; active rock; alternative radio	Interscope	
Australia	8 November 2004	CD	Island	
United Kingdom	8 November 2004	CD; DVD	Island	
Canada	9 November 2004	CD	Island	
Japan	15 November 2004	CD	Island	
Japan	22 December 2004	DVD	Island	
