= U218 =

U218 may refer to:

- U218 Singles, a compilation album by U2
- U218 Videos, a DVD of U2 music videos
- German submarine U-218, a German submarine during World War II
- Uranium-218 (U-218 or ^{218}U), an isotope of uranium
