= Window in the Skies =

2007 single by U2

Single by U2

from the album U218 Singles
- B-side: "Tower of Song"
- Released: 1 January 2007
- Recorded: September 2006
- Studio: Abbey Road (London, England)
- Genre: Rock
- Length: 4:07 (album version); 4:00 (single version)
- Label: Mercury
- Songwriter: U2
- Producer: Rick Rubin

U2 singles chronology
"The Saints Are Coming" (2006)	"Window in the Skies" (2007)	"The Ballad of Ronnie Drew" (2008)

"Window in the Skies" is a song by Irish rock band U2 and is one of two new songs featured on their 2006 compilation album U218 Singles. It was released on 1 January 2007 as the album's second single. It was recorded in September 2006 at Abbey Road Studios in London and produced by Rick Rubin. The song was nominated for a Grammy Award for Best Pop Performance by a Duo or Group with Vocals.

As of 2024, it is the last U2 song to appear in the UK top 10 singles chart.

== Music videos ==
There are two different music videos for this song.

U2 released the first music video for "Window in the Skies" on 20 November 2006, after the completion of their Australian leg of the Vertigo tour. A second version of the video was released a few weeks later.

The first video, directed by Gary Koepke, is a montage that includes nearly 100 clips taken from footage from the previous 50 years of other famous musicians performing in concert. The clips were selected and edited together so that either the lip movements or the finger movements of the musicians, who actually were performing other songs, match up with either the lyrics or the music of the U2 song. The musicians in order of appearance are: Frank Zappa, Billie Holiday, Simon & Garfunkel, Roy Orbison, Björk, Ella Fitzgerald, Bob Marley, Talking Heads, Louis Armstrong, David Bowie, Lou Reed, Frank Sinatra, John Stirratt, Kanye West, Mick Jones, Nat King Cole, Paul Cook, Pete Townshend, The Rolling Stones, Nina Simone, Sam Cooke, Marvin Gaye, Ozzy Osbourne, The Temptations, Sharleen Spiteri, Elvis Costello, The Ramones, Jimi Hendrix, Nirvana, Joe Strummer, Johnny Cash, Iggy Pop, Radiohead, Mary J. Blige, Jane's Addiction, Elvis Presley, Al Green, Morrissey, Beck, Britney Spears, Elton John, The Police, Wu-Tang Clan, Arcade Fire, Joey Ramone, The Temptations, White Stripes, Funkadelic, Kurt Cobain, U2, Charles Mingus, John Paul Jones, Arcade Fire, Keith Richards, Jimi Hendrix, Bob Dylan, Adam Clayton, Chrissie Hynde, Alicia Keys, Ray Charles, Little Richard, The Beatles, Sam Cooke, Keith Moon, David Bowie, The Beatles, Smokey Robinson, John Lennon, Elvis Presley, Led Zeppelin, Vladimir Horowitz, Ronnie Spector, John Bonham, Queen, Muddy Waters, Jackie Wilson, Beastie Boys, Fela Kuti, Talking Heads, Public Enemy, MC5, Flavor Flav, U2, Jerry Lee Lewis, Jay-Z, Larry Mullen Jr., Patti Smith, Apollo Sunshine, Stevie Wonder, Nirvana, U2 and Frank Sinatra. The only confirmed location of the video is the Corner Hotel in Richmond in Melbourne, Australia. The band is featured only very briefly in the crowds as fans.

The second video, directed by Jonas Odell, is another montage. The camera flies through a surreal landscape with floating buildings and still images, mostly of the band from their U2 By U2 autobiography, morphing into each other.

== Live performances ==
The song has only been performed on the fifth leg of U2's Vertigo Tour. The Edge played the song on a Rickenbacker 330-12.

== Track listings ==
CD
No.	Title	Writer(s)	Length
1.	"Window in the Skies" (Single version)	U2	4:00
2.	"Tower of Song" (From Leonard Cohen: I'm Your Man)	Leonard Cohen	5:43
Total length:			9:43

Maxi-CD
No.	Title	Writer(s)	Length
1.	"Window in the Skies" (Single version)	U2	4:00
2.	"Zoo Station" (Live at River Plate Stadium, Buenos Aires, Argentina)	U2	4:35
3.	"Kite" (Live at Telstra Stadium, Sydney, Australia)	U2	8:05
Total length:			16:40

DVD
No.	Title	Writer(s)	Length
1.	"Window in the Skies" (Audio)	U2	4:00
2.	"The Saints Are Coming" (Video; featuring Green Day)	Richard Jobson, Stuart Adamson	3:21
3.	"Tower of Song" (Video - from Leonard Cohen: I'm Your Man)	Leonard Cohen	6:01
Total length:			13:22

== Charts ==
=== Weekly charts ===
Chart (2006–2007)	Peak position
Australia (ARIA)	17
Austria (Ö3 Austria Top 40)	11
Belgium (Ultratop 50 Flanders)	22
Belgium (Ultratop 50 Wallonia)	27
Canada CHR/Top 40 (Billboard)	46
Canada Hot AC (Billboard)	17
Canada Rock (Billboard)	15
Denmark (Tracklisten)	3
Europe (Eurochart Hot 100)	16
Germany (GfK)	14
Greece (IFPI)	5
Ireland (IRMA)	5
Italy (FIMI)	1
Netherlands (Dutch Top 40)	1
Netherlands (Single Top 100)	2
New Zealand (Recorded Music NZ)	28
Norway (VG-lista)	8
Spain (Promusicae)	2
Sweden (Sverigetopplistan)	38
Switzerland (Schweizer Hitparade)	34
UK Singles (Official Charts)	4
US Adult Alternative Airplay (Billboard)	1
US Adult Pop Airplay (Billboard)	26
US Alternative Airplay (Billboard)	32

=== Year-end charts ===
Chart (2007)	Position
Italy (FIMI)	13
Netherlands (Dutch Top 40)	27
Netherlands (Single Top 100)	52

== See also ==
- List of Canadian number-one singles of 2001–07
- List of Dutch Top 40 number-one singles of 2007
- List of number-one hits of 2007 (Italy)
