= Zoo Station (song) =

1991 song by U2

Song by U2

from the album Achtung Baby
- Released: 19 November 1991
- Recorded: October 1990 – September 1991
- Studio: Hansa Ton Studios (Berlin); Elsinore (Dublin); Windmill Lane Studios (Dublin)
- Genre: Alternative rock
- Length: 4:36
- Label: Island
- Composer: U2
- Lyricist: Bono
- Producer: Daniel Lanois

Audio sample
- "Zoo Station": file; help

"Zoo Station" is a song by Irish rock band U2. It is the opening track from their 1991 album Achtung Baby, a record on which the group reinvented themselves musically by incorporating influences from alternative rock, industrial, and electronic dance music. As the album's opening track, "Zoo Station" introduces the band's new sound, delivering industrial-influenced percussion and several layers of distorted guitars and vocals. Similarly, the lyrics suggest the group's new intents and anticipations. The introduction, featuring an "explosion" of percussion and a descending glissando for a guitar hook, was meant to make the listener think the album was mistakenly not U2's latest record or that their music player was broken.

The song's lyrics were inspired by a surrealistic story about Berlin from World War II that lead vocalist Bono heard, when overnight bombing damaged the zoo and allowed animals to escape and wander around the city's rubble. Bono was also inspired by the city's Berlin Zoologischer Garten railway station and used it as a metaphor for a reuniting Germany. "Zoo Station" was performed as the opening song at every concert on U2's Zoo TV Tour. The song received positive reviews from critics, many of whom analysed the song as a representation of the band's reinvention.

== Writing and recording ==
Following difficult recording sessions at Hansa Studios in Berlin in late 1990, U2 undertook the second phase of the recording sessions for Achtung Baby in Dublin. They struggled with the song "Lady With the Spinning Head" (later released as a B-side), but three separate tracks, "Zoo Station", "Ultraviolet (Light My Way)" and "The Fly", were derived from it. The band ultimately decided to take "Zoo Station" in a more industrial direction than "Lady With the Spinning Head".

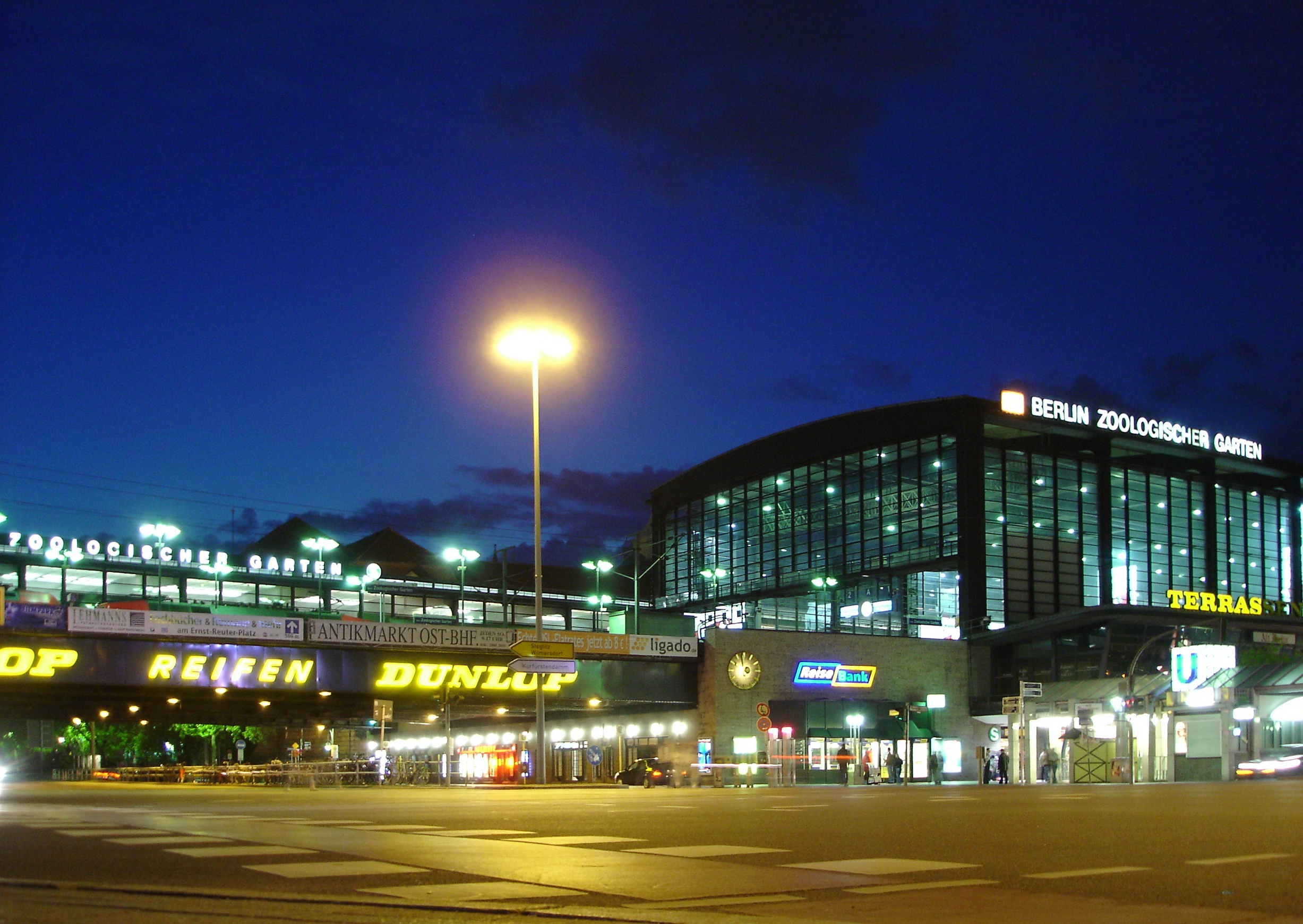
Berlin Zoologischer Garten railway station, colloquially called Bahnhof Zoo ("Zoo Station") in Germany, partially inspired the song's lyrics.

"Zoo Station" came together near the end of the recording sessions when audio engineer Flood was mixing the song and introduced distortion to the drums. The song's direction was largely influenced by the production team of Daniel Lanois, Brian Eno, and Flood. Lead vocalist Bono had been disappointed with his vocals from early recording sessions for the album and told the production team, "Let's just try something that's gonna put me in a completely different place". After they distorted his voice to make it sound as if it were coming from a megaphone, Bono was inspired to sing in a persona, as the effect gave his vocals a different "emotional feel". Flood mixed the final track with the assistance of Shannon Strong. Along with Robbie Adams, Strong also assisted Flood with engineering. Lanois provided additional guitar during recording.

With Achtung Baby, the group sought to recover some of the Dadaist characters and stage antics they had dabbled with in the late 1970s as teenagers. U2 had abandoned these ideas for more literal themes in the 1980s. However, for the new album, the band was interested in no longer making obvious sense. Accordingly, the lyrics for "Zoo Station" were inspired by the surrealism of a story about Berlin during World War II that Bono heard. Animals escaped the city's zoo after it was damaged in overnight bombing, and as a result, rhinoceroses, pelicans and flamingoes wandered around the next morning while people were sifting through the rubble. Bono was also inspired by Berlin Zoologischer Garten railway station, also known as "Zoo station" on the U2 subway line, previously the main railway station in West Berlin. The station was notorious as a haunt for drug dealers, prostitutes and pimps, pick-pockets and transients, particularly prior to German reunification, when it was run by the East German railway. He compared the song to the station, saying "it was written as an opening track, the beasts breaking out of their cages", and was interested in using the zoo as a metaphor and he took further inspiration from the subway station representing Europe at a crossroads.

During recording, Eno created several prototype mixes of the song. The Edge recalled how these different mixes assisted the band in creating the final version of the track. One of these early versions was later released under the title "Bottoms (Watashitachi No Ookina Yume)" as a bonus track on the UK and Japanese promotional releases of the experimental 1995 album Original Soundtracks 1 by Passengers, a side project by U2 and Eno, as well as a B-side on some versions of the "Miss Sarajevo" single. "Bottoms (Watashitachi No Ookina Yume)" is an instrumental track and was described by The Edge as a "crazy" mix. He added "'Bottoms' was done in Japan, and we just built on that mix. Sometimes you can end up with something completely distinctive."

Although "Zoo Station" was not released as a single, it was included on a 12-inch promotional recording to promote U2's Zoo TV Tour in North America, along with studio and remix versions of "Lady with the Spinning Head".

== Composition ==
As the first track on an album that was a major reinvention for the band, "Zoo Station" was an introduction to U2's new sound. The song features layers of distorted guitar and vocals, and industrial-influenced percussion. Irish rock journalist Bill Graham cites David Bowie's album Low as a major influence on "Zoo Station", which he called a "new brand of glam rock" with "Spartan rhythms and sudden flurries of melody".

"The opening of 'Zoo Station' makes a powerful statement: in its deliberate use of 'industrial' sounds that remind us not at all of conventional instruments, in the foregrounding of technology at the beginning of the song—indeed, in making this the opening statement of the album—there can be no mistake that U2 has embraced sound resources new to them. But the fact that it is a deliberately hesitant gesture puts it clearly in the realm of satire. Perhaps it satirizes the technology itself, or U2's new embracing of technology."

— Susan Fast

The song is played at a tempo of 130 beats per minute in a 4/4 time signature, but only one element of the song's introduction, a marimba-like texture, is played in common time. This sound, which has been compared to that of a clock ticking, was achieved by picking the guitar's D string behind the bridge and the stopbar. On the second half of the third beat, the song's signature guitar riff, a distorted descending glissando, enters. The glissando descends past the octave it begins in by a major second before returning to it. After the second time it is played, an "explosion" of percussion is heard, playing on beat four of every second measure on two occasions. This percussion sound, played by Flood, enters early the third time, being played on beat two. The drums then enter, before stopping and starting again. Much like the song's guitar sounds, the drums' timbre is noticeably different from previous U2 songs as it exhibits a "cold, processed sound, something like beating on a tin can". Amidst layers of various guitar sounds, the bass enters, the part played in the introduction and verses consisting of repeating G and A notes, mimicking the ascending portion of the guitar riff after the glissando overshoots the octave. After the bass begins, the song's regular groove is established. At 0:45, the chord progression changes. Fifteen seconds later, the song returns to the previous chord progression and the introduction ends.

Guitarist The Edge explained that some of the sounds in the introduction that resemble keyboards were actually created by him on guitar. Of the song's introduction, bassist Adam Clayton says, "When people put on the record, we wanted their first reaction to be either 'this record is broken' or 'this can't be the new U2 record, there's been a mistake.' So there is quite a dramatic extended intro where you just don't know what you are listening to." Author Albin Zak, in his book The Poetics of Rock, says of the introduction, "Before any words are sung, the sounds alone alert the listener that the band has moved into new expressive territory."

After the introduction, the song follows a conventional verse-chorus form. The first verse begins one minute into the song, with Bono announcing, "I'm ready, I'm ready for the laughing gas". During the verses, he sings primarily in a medium-to-low range and his vocals are treated with heavy processing, which takes out the bottom of the sound and "emasculate[s]" his voice. The processing also introduces a wavering quality to his vocals. The guitar glissando continues to be played during the verses. The first chorus begins at 1:44, and the music mirrors the change in chord progression from the introduction's last 15 seconds. During the chorus, the bassline becomes more dynamic, playing descending quarter notes of G–F♯–D–C–D–C–A–G–A, before resuming the previous G and A pattern. Bono's vocals also become more dynamic in the chorus, featuring layers of both "open-throated" singing and monotone lyric recitation, as well as both processed and unprocessed vocals.

Along with introducing the band's new sound, the song opens the album as a statement of intent. Lyrically, new anticipations and appetites are suggested ("I'm ready for what's next"), as is a willingness to throw caution to the wind and take risks ("I'm ready to let go of the steering wheel"). Some of the lyrics, particularly those in the bridge before the final chorus, use the eponymous subway station as a metaphor for time: "Time is a train / Makes the future the past / Leaves you standing in the station / Your face pressed up against the glass". Bono cites the enjoyment of his first child born in 1989 as a major influence on Achtung Baby, as was his wife's second pregnancy during the album's 1991 recording. Bono says babies influenced the lines from the first verse, "I'm ready to say I'm glad to be alive / I'm ready, I'm ready for the push".

== Reception and legacy ==
Upon the release of Achtung Baby, "Zoo Station" was praised by many critics. Steve Morse of The Boston Globe said the song was one on which "sonic assaults are teamed with dreamily processed vocals that recall Beatles psychedelia". The Orlando Sentinel called it "blistering" and praised the low mixing of Bono's vocals, which allowed The Edge's "new versatility" on guitar to draw more attention. BBC Music enjoyed "The Edge's guitar squall and electronics" creating a "dense sound [that] is irresistible", noting that "Zoo Station" was one track where the strategy "creates moods rather than hummable tunes". Jon Pareles of The New York Times stated that the song "announces a change, starting with a metallic clank, a buzzing guitar slide and a repeated electronic crunch—nothing ethereal". He also noted that Bono's voice was "electronically masked and the band's old style traded for a pushy bassline and a percussive stomp, although U2 can't resist some sweeter interludes".

Rolling Stone was complimentary of The Edge, comparing his style of guitar playing on the song to using a rhythm instrument by "repeating a dark, buzzing phrase that drives the beat". Allmusic reviewed the track favourably, saying "there are layers to Bono's lyrics" and that by the end of the track, the song and the band are "soaring". Greg Kot of the Chicago Tribune likened the song's introduction to "trying to out-demolish Ministry" with "grating metal-on-metal percussion and a belching guitar". He commented that the "rude awakening" that the song provides on the album as the opening track could only compare with the "fingernails-on-chalkboard guitar scuzz" of Neil Young's "Hey Hey, My My (Into the Black)" from Rust Never Sleeps. The song subsequently appeared as one of seven U2 songs in the 2006 music reference book 1001 Songs: The Great Songs of All Time and the Artists, Stories, and Secrets.

"Zoo Station" is featured in the 2002 British comedy-drama film About a Boy. In one scene, the main character, Will (Hugh Grant), turns up the volume of the song as a "childless effort" to ignore Marcus (Nicholas Hoult), a boy ringing Will's doorbell, prompting Marcus to ring it in unison with the beat of the song.

The song was covered by American industrial rock band Nine Inch Nails on the 2011 cover album AHK-toong BAY-bi Covered. It was also covered by The Smashing Pumpkins throughout their 2024 tour appearances.

== Live performances ==
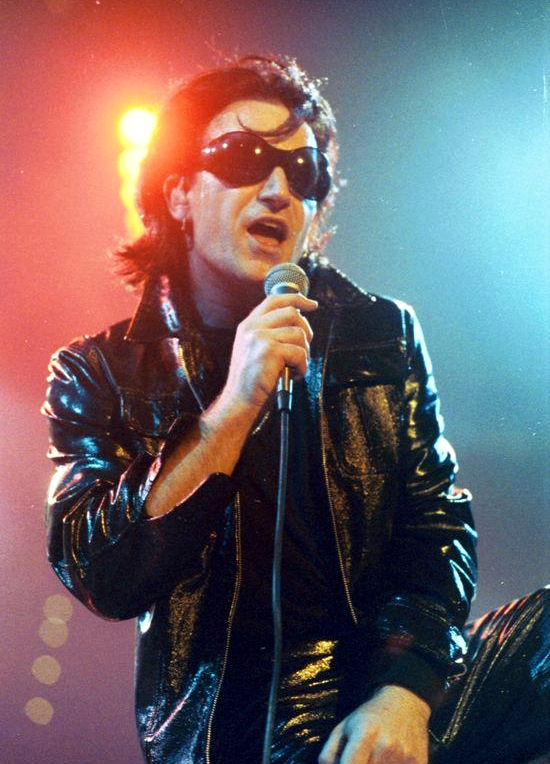
During performances of "Zoo Station" on the Zoo TV Tour, Bono would arrive on-stage as his stage persona "The Fly".

"Zoo Station" made its live debut on the opening night of the Zoo TV Tour on 29 February 1992 in Lakeland, Florida, and was performed as the opening song at each of the 156 Zoo TV concerts. During performances of "Zoo Station", Bono appeared on-stage silhouetted against a giant screen of blue and white video noise, making his entrance as his leather-clad stage persona "The Fly", often goose-stepping his way onto the stage. The Edge described the visual imagery displayed for the song in the context of Zoo TV's "sensory overload" that was intended as a commentary on mass media: "'Zoo Station' is four minutes of a television that's not tuned in to any station, but giving you interference and 'shash' and almost a TV picture."

"Zoo Station" was not played during the subsequent PopMart and Elevation Tours, but it returned to the group's set lists on the Vertigo Tour. The song was most often performed during the first encore, along with other Achtung Baby/Zoo TV-era songs, as part of a mini-Zoo TV set paying homage to the band's 1990s era. It made its last appearance in November 2006 and was not played live again until the September 24, 2015 concert on the Innocence + Experience Tour. The song returned to the band's setlists during the Experience + Innocence Tour in 2018, and was played nineteen times.

U2 performed "Zoo Station" during their 2023–2024 U2:UV Achtung Baby residency at the Sphere in the Las Vegas Valley, as the opening song of concerts. As the introduction was played, the concrete visuals that were displaying on the venue's LED screen during the preshow appeared to crack open, splitting into four quadrants; this allowed in light in the shape of a cross, which was inspired by the architecture of the Church of the Light. The opening revealed video imagery behind it, some of it the original footage by Mark Pellington from the Zoo TV Tour. Bono began the concerts wearing the wraparound sunglasses that were characteristic of his Zoo TV stage persona "the Fly".

Live performances of the song appear on the video releases Zoo TV: Live from Sydney and Vertigo 2005: Live from Chicago. A live version of "Zoo Station" from the Vertigo Tour also appears as a B-side on the maxi single for "Window in the Skies".
