= Vertigo Tour =

2005–06 concert tour by U2

- World tour by U2
- Location: North America; Europe; South America; Oceania; Asia
- Associated album: How to Dismantle an Atomic Bomb
- Start date: 28 March 2005
- End date: 9 December 2006
- Legs: 5
- No. of shows: 131
- Attendance: 4,619,021
- Box office: US$389 million

U2 concert chronology
- Elevation Tour (2001); Vertigo Tour (2005–2006); U2 360° Tour (2009–2011)

The Vertigo Tour was a worldwide concert tour by the Irish rock band U2. Staged in support of the group's 2004 album How to Dismantle an Atomic Bomb, the tour visited arenas and stadiums between March 2005 and December 2006. The Vertigo Tour consisted of five legs that alternated between indoor arena shows in North America and outdoor stadium shows internationally. Much like the previous Elevation Tour, the indoor portion of the Vertigo Tour featured a stripped-down, intimate stage design. Protruding from the main stage was an ellipse-shaped catwalk that encapsulated a small number of fans.

The tour grossed US$260 million in 110 sold-out concerts in 2005, making it the top-grossing tour of the year. In North America alone, the tour grossed $138.9 million from 1.4 million tickets sold. The Vertigo Tour won the 2005 Billboard Roadwork Touring Awards for Top Tour, Top Draw, and Top Single Event, and U2's management company Principle Management won for Top Manager. By the time it finished, the Vertigo Tour had sold 4,619,021 tickets from 131 shows, and became the second-highest-grossing concert tour with $389 million earned. The tour was depicted in three concert films: Vertigo 2005: Live from Chicago, Vertigo: Live from Milan, and U2 3D.

== Itinerary ==
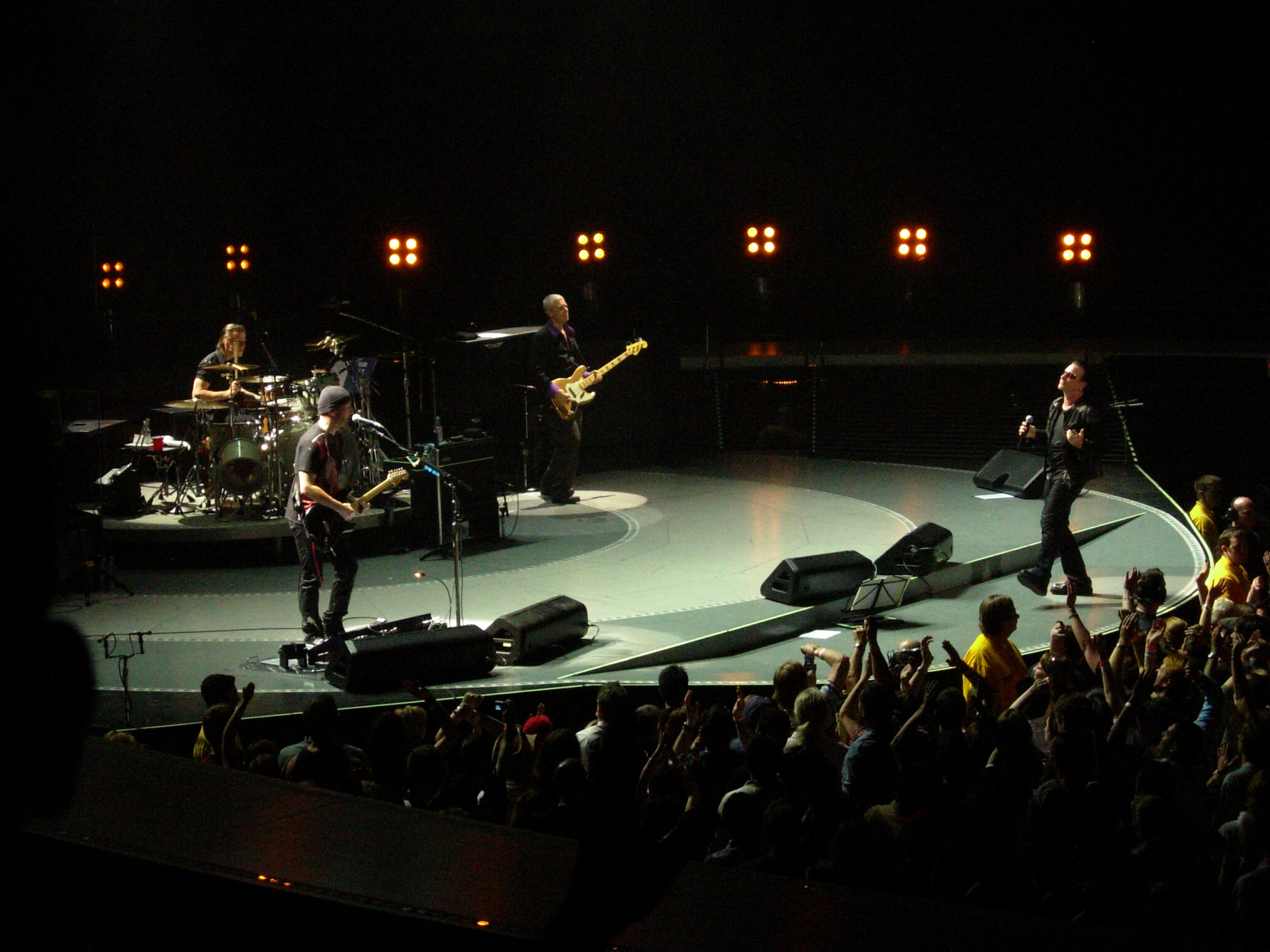
U2 performs in Anaheim on April 1, 2005.

After rehearsing for several months in Vancouver, and stage rehearsals at Baja Studios in Rosarito, Mexico. The tour's opening night was on 28 March 2005 at the iPayOne Center in San Diego, California. The first leg through North America consisted of 28 sold-out indoor arena shows and finished on 28 May in Boston, Massachusetts.

The second leg was a European stadium tour, commencing on 10 June in Brussels and finishing on 14 August in Lisbon. They played in a number of venues including Amsterdam, London, Dublin, Madrid, Milan, and Oslo. U2 broke Irish box office marks with ticket sales for three Croke Park concerts in Dublin, after more than 240,000 tickets were sold in record time. In The Netherlands, Belgium, France, and Austria, the tickets were all sold within 60 minutes.

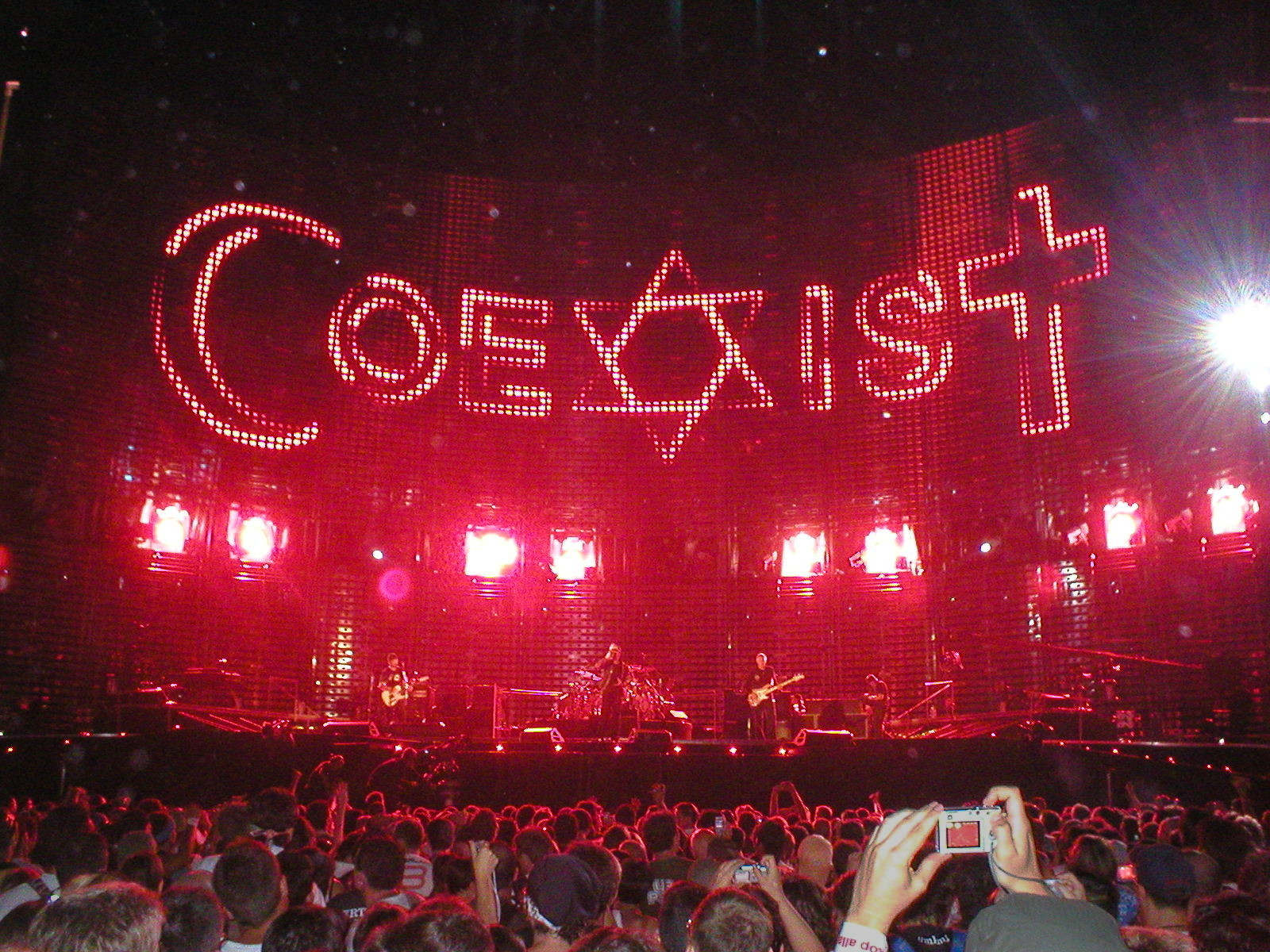
The symbols of Islam, Judaism, and Christianity form the word "CoeXisT" during a performance of "Sunday Bloody Sunday".

The band then returned to North America in the autumn for the third leg, playing 50 sold-out shows in indoor arenas, starting on September 12 in Toronto and finishing up on December 19 in Portland, Oregon.

A fourth leg began on 12 February 2006 in Monterrey, Mexico, and ran through March visiting Mexico, Brazil, Argentina, and Chile; many of these locales had not seen a live U2 performance in nearly a decade and proved to be a hugely successful leg, with massive audiences attending these shows.

On 9 March 2006, it was announced the final 10 shows in New Zealand, Australia, Japan, and Hawaii were postponed due to guitarist The Edge's 7-year-old daughter Sian's diagnosis of leukaemia. (The initial start of the tour had been postponed for the same reason, prior to any tickets being sold.) On 20 July 2006, it was announced that they were rescheduled for November and December, with some adjustments and additions of dates. The fifth leg started on 7 November in Brisbane, Australia and concluded on 9 December 2006 at Aloha Stadium in Honolulu, Hawaii after thirteen shows.

== Stage design ==
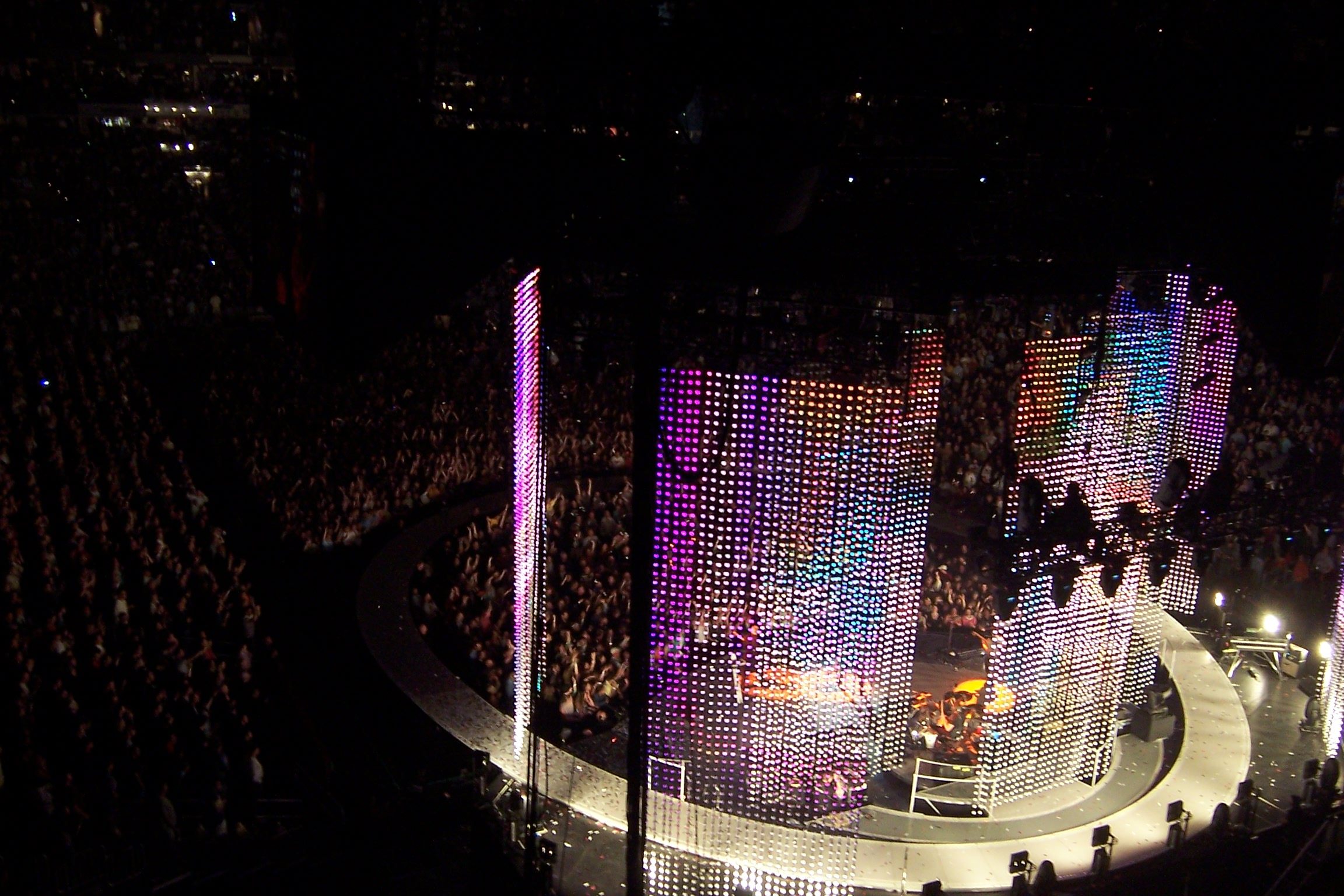
The stage and LED curtain viewed from the rear at the Wachovia Center in Philadelphia on 22 May 2005.

The Vertigo Tour's production was designed by architect Mark Fisher and stage and lighting designer Willie Williams. Key elements were an ellipse-shaped ramp on the floor connected to the stage, with some fans inside it and some outside it (similar to the heart-shaped ramp used on the previous Elevation Tour). The inside area of the ellipse came to be known as the "bomb shelter", in reference to the supporting album.

In the North American shows, a set of seven retractable, see-through LED-based lighted bead curtains hung behind and to the side of the stage, showing abstract patterns, maps, moving figures, and occasionally text. The curtain design permitted concertgoers around the arena to have an excellent view of the curtains above the band and the images they displayed. The roll-drop LED screens were designed by Fisher using 360deg golf-ball pixels developed with Frederic Opsomer of Innovative Designs in Belgium. The spherical LED product joined the BARCO product line as the Mi-Sphere. The Vertigo Tour used 189 strings of these "MiSphere" LED balls suspended from custom truss, which allows the LED curtains to be rolled up. High above the center stage hung the MiSphere strings, each containing 64 spheres and totaling nine meters long. Dynamic, "moving" lights were also embedded in the stage and the B-stage ramp, as well. Four screens suspended above the stage showed close-ups of each member of the band, another element reused from the Elevation Tour.

For the European, Latin American and Australian stadium shows, the bead curtains were replaced by an LED screen behind the band. The screen was assembled from BARCO O-Lite modules. The assembly of the screen was similar to the rigging used for the LED screen in the PopMart Tour. The ellipse was also replaced with two catwalks leading to two B-stages in the style of the 'Vertigo target'.

=== Lighting gear list ===
The following gear was used for the show's lighting:

- 54 Martin MAC 2000 Wash
- 15 Vari*Lite VL3000
- 37 Martin Atomic 3000 Strobe
- 66 2x2 DWE audience blinders
- 12 Lycian M2 Follow Spot
- 6 Strong 3K Gladiator Follow Spot
- 6 Saco Technologies LED Factory Light (custom)
- 24 ETC Source Four Leko
- 6 Lowell Tota light
- 6 1x4 DWE audience blinders
- 2 18K HMI Fresnel
- 1 Flying Pig Systems WholeHog 3 console (running beta version of the new 1.3.9 software)
- 189 MiSphere string
- 4 Barco G10 projector
- 5 Barco G5 projector
- 5 Folsom Encore image processor

A PlayStation controller was used to control High End Systems DL1 units for audience shots presented on the large video screens.

== Set list ==
The show's set list varied, with notable differences between each leg of the tour.

=== Main set ===
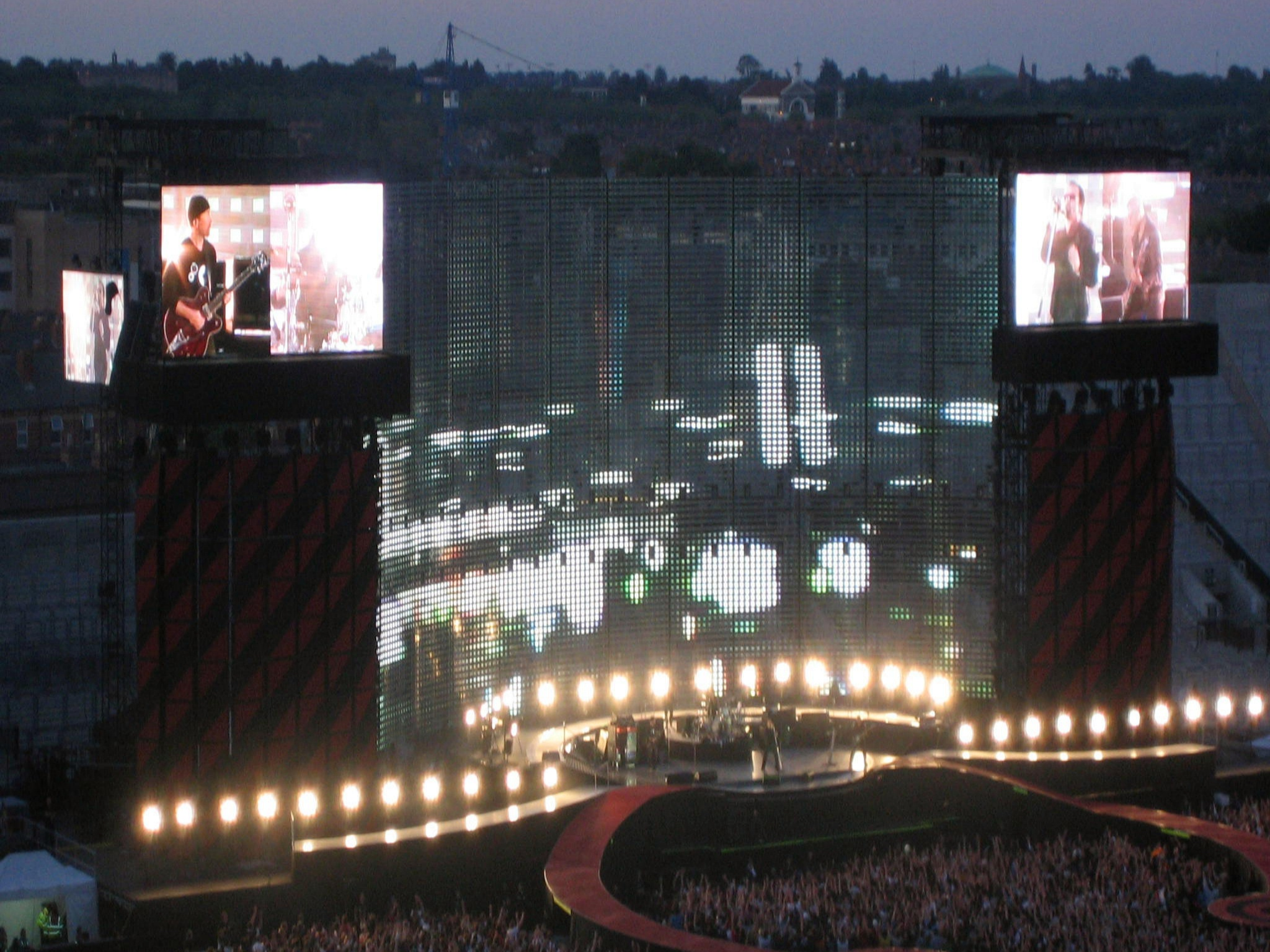
U2 performs "City of Blinding Lights" in their home town of Dublin in June 2005.

Prior to the band taking the stage, "Wake Up" by Canadian rock band Arcade Fire was played as introduction music. The arena shows of the first and third legs usually began with the same trio of songs: "City of Blinding Lights", "Vertigo", and "Elevation". On the first leg, "City of Blinding Lights" would alternate with "Love and Peace or Else", and sometimes "Beautiful Day" appeared in the opening trio. In contrast, the stadium concerts of the second leg opened with "Vertigo", "I Will Follow", and "The Electric Co.", though "I Will Follow's" position was occasionally occupied by other songs. By the fourth leg, "City of Blinding Lights", "Vertigo" and "Elevation" were the standard opening trio that was only altered once – early on in the fourth leg. After the opening trio, songs from U2's early days were played at the arena shows, while the stadium shows featured more anthemic rock songs. "New Year's Day", "Until the End of the World", "I Still Haven't Found What I'm Looking For", and "Miracle Drug" were examples of songs that often appeared in the main set. Beyond this point in the set list, the stadium and indoor sets became roughly similar. "Sometimes You Can't Make it on Your Own" was played at every show as a tribute to Bono's father. There was then a sequence of politically based songs (usually "Love and Peace or Else", "Sunday Bloody Sunday", and "Bullet the Blue Sky"), based around the theme of "Coexist" (written to show a Muslim Crescent, Jewish Star of David, and Christian Cross). Later, with flags of African nations displayed on the screens, "Where the Streets Have No Name" followed "Pride (In the Name of Love)". This led to a plea from Bono to participate in the ONE Campaign, while the opening of "One" played.

=== Encores ===
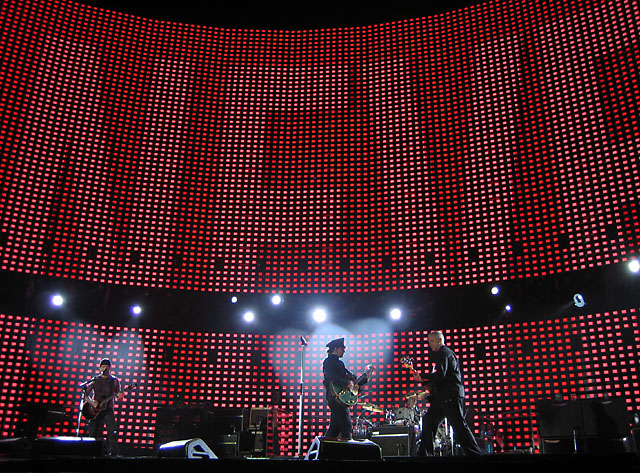
"The Fly" performed on the opening night of the European leg at King Baudouin Stadium in Brussels on 10 June 2005.

The encores varied from leg to leg, and night to night. The first encore was frequently a musical and visual look back to U2's Zoo TV Tour, usually featuring "Zoo Station", "The Fly", and "Mysterious Ways". However, for many shows on the third leg, this was discarded in favor of an acoustic encore. The second encore often showcased recent material, and almost all second-leg shows as well as rare first and third-leg shows ended with a repeat of "Vertigo", in homage to U2's early concert days when they would run out of songs to play. The usual concert finisher in the first leg was "40" where Adam and Edge would switch instruments, but over the course of the tour, many other closing songs would be used as well.

At the start of the much-delayed fifth leg in Australia, the usual first Zoo TV-style encore was used initially, but several shows into the leg "Zoo Station" was dropped in favour of "Mysterious Ways" with "The Fly" opening the encore, making the first encore "The Fly", "Mysterious Ways" and "With or Without You". The second encore, however, showcased three songs that had not been played until this point on the entire tour. "The Saints Are Coming" was played, following U2 and Green Day's using it to reopen the Louisiana Superdome. Up next was a full electric performance of "Angel of Harlem". Making its Vertigo Tour debut and closing a show for the first time ever was "Kite", which had not been played since the end of the Elevation Tour five years prior. "Kite" was accompanied by a didgeridoo and the show ended with Bono releasing a kite from one of the B-Stages. During the band's second show in Auckland, "One Tree Hill" replaced "Kite" as the show closer. The encore of the final concert of the tour in Honolulu included "The Saints Are Coming" featuring Billie Joe Armstrong, "Window in the Skies", and Neil Young's "Rockin' in the Free World" featuring Eddie Vedder and Mike McCready. The tour ended with the song "All I Want Is You".

=== Diversity of material played ===
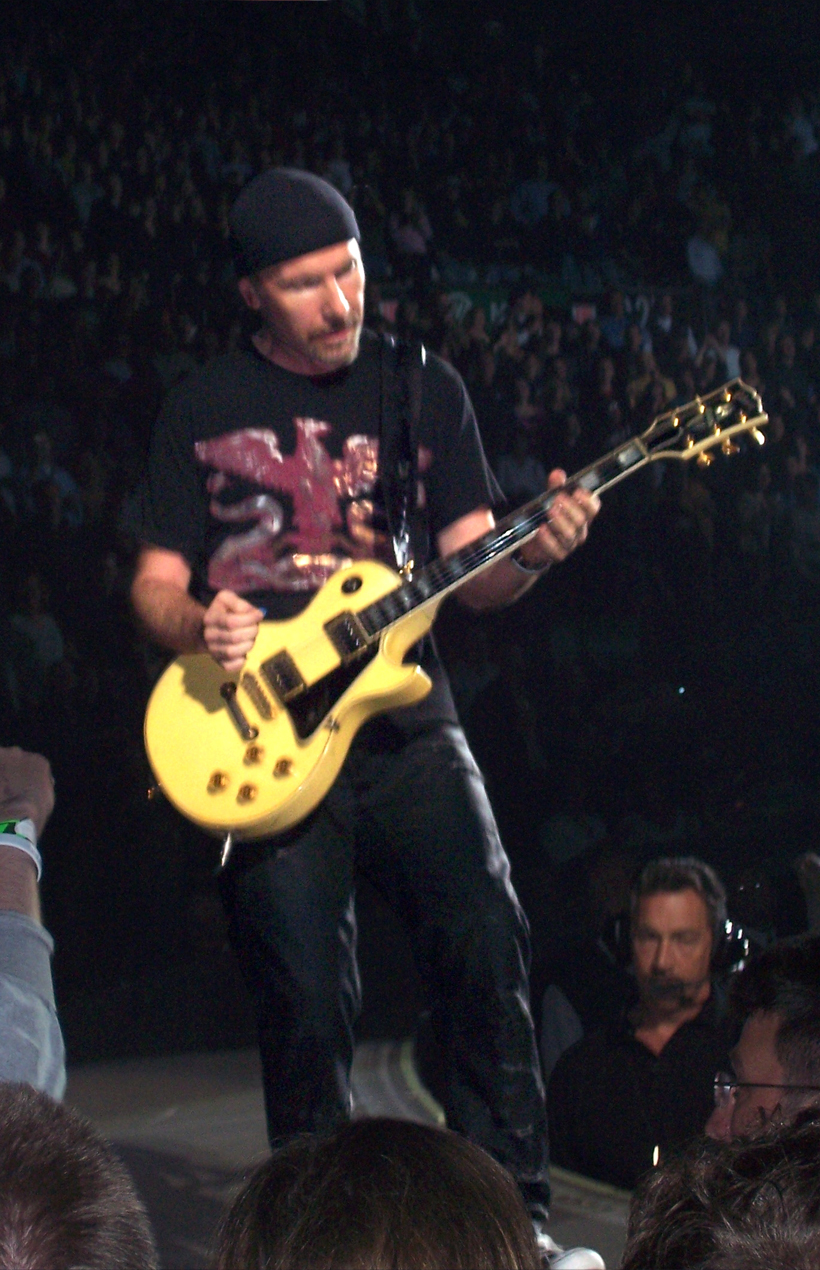
The Edge plays "Electric Co." in Pittsburgh in October 2005; the song had been a staple of the band's live act in the early 1980s, but had not been played in 17 years.

The Vertigo Tour was notable not only for its diversity of material—it was the first tour since the Lovetown Tour to feature at least one song from each of their currently released albums—but for the rarity of some songs played. "The Ocean" had not been performed since December 1982. Tracks from their debut album Boy were chosen ahead of tracks from their biggest-selling album, The Joshua Tree. A number of other songs returned to the set list after absences of more than fifteen years, including material from October, while "The First Time", from 1993's Zooropa album, was played in full live for the first time. "Miss Sarajevo", a song from U2's side project Original Soundtracks No. 1, became a concert regular despite previously only being played live twice since its release in 1995. Although Luciano Pavarotti sang the operatic vocals on the original, "Miss Sarajevo" featured Bono competently singing the operatic vocals. Also, "Discothèque", from 1997's Pop album, made its final two appearances. The Vertigo Tour has also featured Larry Mullen, Jr. on vocals on "Elevation", "Miracle Drug" and "Love and Peace or Else". All but two songs ("A Man and a Woman" and "One Step Closer") from How to Dismantle an Atomic Bomb were performed on the tour. "Fast Cars", a bonus track on some countries' editions of the album, was also performed. "Walk On", the Grammy Award-winning song from All That You Can't Leave Behind, was played only sparingly on the tour, and barring performances in Brisbane and Sydney, was played in stripped-back acoustic form. Also "Bad", which was a regular on the Elevation Tour playlist, was played less frequently on this tour.

== Concert filming ==
Two nights of the band's four-night engagement in Chicago, Illinois in May 2005 were filmed for the live DVD Vertigo 2005: Live From Chicago. During the European stadium leg of the Vertigo Tour in the summer of 2005, four more concerts were filmed: two in Dublin and two in Milan. Songs from the Milan shows were featured in a band profile on 60 Minutes and on U2.COMmunication. Ten songs performed at the Milan concert appeared as a special edition bonus DVD in U2's November 2006 compilation album U218 Singles. The 20 February 2006 show in São Paulo, Brazil was broadcast live by Rede Globo. Additionally, 700 hours of footage from seven Latin American concerts were filmed in 3D HD for the film U2 3D, released in 2008 in Real D Cinemas. On 18 and 19 November, additional U2 3D filming was done at the Melbourne concerts at Telstra Dome, as additional shots of the stage's LED display and the concert audience were needed.

== Support acts ==
Support slots were taken up by Ash, Arcade Fire, Athlete, Dashboard Confessional, Feeder, Franz Ferdinand, Interpol, Kanye West, Keane, The Killers, Kings of Leon (first U.S. leg only), Scissor Sisters, Snow Patrol, Starsailor (Cardiff only), Paddy Casey (Dublin only), Razorlight, Pearl Jam (Honolulu only) and The Zutons.

== Reception ==
Like its predecessor, the Vertigo Tour was a commercial success, ranking as the top-earning tour of 2005 with US$260 million grossed. In North America alone, the tour grossed $138.9 million from 1.4 million tickets sold. The Vertigo Tour won the 2005 Billboard Roadwork Touring Awards for Top Tour, Top Draw, and Top Single Event, and U2's management company Principle Management won for Top Manager. By the time it finished, the Vertigo Tour had sold 4,619,021 tickets from 131 shows, and became the second-highest-grossing concert tour with $389 million earned. It was bested only by The Rolling Stones' A Bigger Bang Tour, which took place at roughly the same time but was longer overall.

=== Ticket presale controversy ===
The band's website, U2.com, was involved in a ticket presale controversy that upset fans. Users who paid $40 for a subscription to U2.com were promised the opportunity to purchase tickets in a presale that preceded any general public ticket sales. However, many fans were unable to purchase tickets, as technical glitches plagued the presale. Additionally, many scalpers had taken advantage of the system by subscribing to U2.com and purchasing as many tickets as possible, with the intentions of selling them for profit. Larry Mullen, Jr. apologized on behalf of the band at the Grammy Awards.

== Tour dates ==
List of 2005 concerts
Date (2005)	City	Country	Venue	Opening act	Attendance	Revenue
March 28	San Diego	United States	iPayOne Center	Kings of Leon	29,140 / 29,140	$2,909,029
March 30	San Diego	United States	iPayOne Center	Kings of Leon	29,140 / 29,140	$2,909,029
April 1	Anaheim	United States	Arrowhead Pond of Anaheim	Kings of Leon	33,535 / 33,535	$3,454,198
April 2	Anaheim	United States	Arrowhead Pond of Anaheim	Kings of Leon	33,535 / 33,535	$3,454,198
April 5	Los Angeles	United States	Staples Center	Kings of Leon	34,527 / 34,527	$3,673,850
April 6	Los Angeles	United States	Staples Center	Kings of Leon	34,527 / 34,527	$3,673,850
April 9	San Jose	United States	HP Pavilion	Kings of Leon	36,140 / 36,140	$3,357,098
April 10	San Jose	United States	HP Pavilion	Kings of Leon	36,140 / 36,140	$3,357,098
April 14	Glendale	United States	Glendale Arena	Kings of Leon	34,905 / 34,905	$3,198,861
April 15	Glendale	United States	Glendale Arena	Kings of Leon	34,905 / 34,905	$3,198,861
April 20	Denver	United States	Pepsi Center	Kings of Leon	36,714 / 36,714	$3,509,741
April 21	Denver	United States	Pepsi Center	Kings of Leon	36,714 / 36,714	$3,509,741
April 24	Seattle	United States	KeyArena	Kings of Leon	30,251 / 30,251	$3,105,754
April 25	Seattle	United States	KeyArena	Kings of Leon	30,251 / 30,251	$3,105,754
April 28	Vancouver	Canada	General Motors Place	Kings of Leon	37,031 / 37,031	$3,020,466
April 29	Vancouver	Canada	General Motors Place	Kings of Leon	37,031 / 37,031	$3,020,466
May 7	Chicago	United States	United Center	Kings of Leon	77,173 / 77,173	$7,541,679
May 9	Chicago	United States	United Center	Kings of Leon	77,173 / 77,173	$7,541,679
May 10	Chicago	United States	United Center	Kings of Leon	77,173 / 77,173	$7,541,679
May 12	Chicago	United States	United Center	Kings of Leon	77,173 / 77,173	$7,541,679
May 14	Philadelphia	United States	Wachovia Center	Kings of Leon	39,273 / 39,273	$3,767,178
May 17	East Rutherford	United States	Continental Airlines Arena	Kings of Leon	40,347 / 40,347	$3,838,066
May 18	East Rutherford	United States	Continental Airlines Arena	Kings of Leon	40,347 / 40,347	$3,838,066
May 21	New York City	United States	Madison Square Garden	Kings of Leon	18,415 / 18,415	$1,907,086
May 22	Philadelphia	United States	Wachovia Center	Kings of Leon	(Note: The score data is representative of the two shows in Philadelphia, Pennsylvania at the Wachovia Center on May 14 and May 22 respectively.)	
May 24	Boston	United States	FleetCenter	Kings of Leon	51,658 / 51,658	$5,071,565
May 26	Boston	United States	FleetCenter	Kings of Leon	51,658 / 51,658	$5,071,565
May 28	Boston	United States	FleetCenter	Kings of Leon	51,658 / 51,658	$5,071,565
June 10	Brussels	Belgium	King Baudouin Stadium	The Thrills; Snow Patrol	60,499 / 60,499	$4,864,554
June 12	Gelsenkirchen	Germany	Veltins-Arena	The Thrills; Feeder	59,120 / 59,120	$4,203,947
June 14	Manchester	England	City of Manchester Stadium	The Bravery; Idlewild; Snow Patrol; Athlete	107,671 / 107,671	$11,119,740
June 15	Manchester	England	City of Manchester Stadium	The Bravery; Idlewild; Snow Patrol; Athlete	107,671 / 107,671	$11,119,740
June 18	London	England	Twickenham Stadium	Doves; Idlewild; Athlete; Ash	110,796 / 110,796	$13,677,410
June 19	London	England	Twickenham Stadium	Doves; Idlewild; Athlete; Ash	110,796 / 110,796	$13,677,410
June 21	Glasgow	Scotland	Hampden Park	Black Rebel Motorcycle Club; Interpol	53,395 / 53,395	$5,819,053
June 24	Dublin	Ireland	Croke Park	The Radiators; The Thrills; The Bravery; Snow Patrol; Paddy Casey; Ash	246,743 / 246,743	$21,163,695
June 25	Dublin	Ireland	Croke Park	The Radiators; The Thrills; The Bravery; Snow Patrol; Paddy Casey; Ash	246,743 / 246,743	$21,163,695
June 27	Dublin	Ireland	Croke Park	The Radiators; The Thrills; The Bravery; Snow Patrol; Paddy Casey; Ash	246,743 / 246,743	$21,163,695
June 29	Cardiff	Wales	Millennium Stadium	Starsailor; The Killers	63,677 / 63,677	$6,406,073
July 2	Vienna	Austria	Ernst-Happel-Stadion	The Thrills; The Magic Numbers	55,645 / 55,645	$4,200,416
July 5	Chorzów	Poland	Stadion Śląski	The Killers; The Magic Numbers	64,711 / 64,711	$3,127,416
July 7	Berlin	Germany	Olympiastadion	Snow Patrol; Kaiser Chiefs	70,443 / 70,443	$4,725,530
July 9	Paris	France	Stade de France	Snow Patrol; Starsailor; The Music	160,349 / 160,349	$11,822,645
July 10	Paris	France	Stade de France	Snow Patrol; Starsailor; The Music	160,349 / 160,349	$11,822,645
July 13	Amsterdam	Netherlands	Amsterdam Arena	The Killers; Snow Patrol; Kaiser Chiefs; The Music; Athlete	165,516 / 165,516	$13,022,200
July 15	Amsterdam	Netherlands	Amsterdam Arena	The Killers; Snow Patrol; Kaiser Chiefs; The Music; Athlete	165,516 / 165,516	$13,022,200
July 16	Amsterdam	Netherlands	Amsterdam Arena	The Killers; Snow Patrol; Kaiser Chiefs; The Music; Athlete	165,516 / 165,516	$13,022,200
July 18	Zürich	Switzerland	Letzigrund	Ash; Feeder	44,260 / 44,260	$3,574,993
July 20	Milan	Italy	Stadio Giuseppe Meazza	Ash; Feeder	137,427 / 137,427	$7,565,264
July 21	Milan	Italy	Stadio Giuseppe Meazza	Ash; Feeder	137,427 / 137,427	$7,565,264
July 23	Rome	Italy	Stadio Olimpico	Ash; Feeder	67,002 / 67,002	$4,010,779
July 27,	Oslo	Norway	Valle Hovin	Razorlight; Paddy Casey	40,000 / 40,000	$3,765,136
July 29	Gothenburg	Sweden	Ullevi	Razorlight; The Soundtrack of Our Lives	58,478 / 58,478	$4,081,864
July 31	Copenhagen	Denmark	Parken Stadium	Razorlight; The Soundtrack of Our Lives	50,000 / 50,000	$3,650,294
August 3	Munich	Germany	Olympiastadion	Keane; The Zutons	77,435 / 77,435	$5,343,379
August 5	Nice	France	Stade Charles-Ehrmann	Keane; The Zutons	51,900 / 51,900	$3,548,702
August 7	Barcelona	Spain	Camp Nou	Kaiser Chiefs; Keane	81,269 / 81,269	$5,130,437
August 9	San Sebastián	Spain	Estadio Anoeta	Franz Ferdinand; Kaiser Chiefs	43,720 / 43,720	$2,936,571
August 11	Madrid	Spain	Vicente Calderón Stadium	Franz Ferdinand; Kaiser Chiefs	57,040 / 57,040	$3,679,354
August 14	Lisbon	Portugal	Estádio José Alvalade	Kaiser Chiefs; Keane	55,362 / 55,362	$4,492,762
September 12	Toronto	Canada	Air Canada Centre	Dashboard Confessional	82,572 / 82,572	$7,624,870
September 14	Toronto	Canada	Air Canada Centre	Dashboard Confessional	82,572 / 82,572	$7,624,870
September 16	Toronto	Canada	Air Canada Centre	Dashboard Confessional	82,572 / 82,572	$7,624,870
September 17	Toronto	Canada	Air Canada Centre	Dashboard Confessional	82,572 / 82,572	$7,624,870
September 20	Chicago	United States	United Center	Dashboard Confessional	38,815 / 38,815	$3,795,583
September 21	Chicago	United States	United Center	Dashboard Confessional	38,815 / 38,815	$3,795,583
September 23	Minneapolis	United States	Target Center	Dashboard Confessional	19,328 / 19,328	$1,823,883
September 25	Milwaukee	United States	Bradley Center	Dashboard Confessional	19,336 / 19,336	$1,782,895
October 3	Boston	United States	TD Banknorth Garden	Keane	34,488 / 34,488	$3,381,429
October 4	Boston	United States	TD Banknorth Garden	Keane	34,488 / 34,488	$3,381,429
October 7	New York City	United States	Madison Square Garden	Keane	93,275 / 93,275	$9,658,009
October 8	New York City	United States	Madison Square Garden	Keane	93,275 / 93,275	$9,658,009
October 10	New York City	United States	Madison Square Garden	Keane	93,275 / 93,275	$9,658,009
October 11	New York City	United States	Madison Square Garden	Keane	93,275 / 93,275	$9,658,009
October 14	New York City	United States	Madison Square Garden	Keane	93,275 / 93,275	$9,658,009
October 16	Philadelphia	United States	Wachovia Center	Damian Marley	39,905 / 39,905	$3,773,053
October 17	Philadelphia	United States	Wachovia Center	Damian Marley	39,905 / 39,905	$3,773,053
October 19	Washington, D.C.	United States	MCI Center	Damian Marley	38,181 / 38,181	$3,902,569
October 20	Washington, D.C.	United States	MCI Center	Damian Marley	38,181 / 38,181	$3,902,569
October 22	Pittsburgh	United States	Mellon Arena	Damian Marley	16,899 / 16,899	$1,636,798
October 24	Auburn Hills	United States	The Palace of Auburn Hills	Institute	41,379 / 41,379	$3,951,103
October 25	Auburn Hills	United States	The Palace of Auburn Hills	Institute	41,379 / 41,379	$3,951,103
October 28	Houston	United States	Toyota Center	Damian Marley	17,002 / 17,002	$1,652,699
October 29	Dallas	United States	American Airlines Center	Damian Marley	17,988 / 17,988	$1,689,471
November 1	Los Angeles	United States	Staples Center	Damian Marley	34,291 / 34,291	$3,656,978
November 2	Los Angeles	United States	Staples Center	Damian Marley	34,291 / 34,291	$3,656,978
November 4	Las Vegas	United States	MGM Grand Garden Arena	Damian Marley	31,863 / 31,863	$3,864,843
November 5	Las Vegas	United States	MGM Grand Garden Arena	Damian Marley	31,863 / 31,863	$3,864,843
November 8	Oakland	United States	Oakland Arena	Damian Marley	36,340 / 36,340	$3,638,620
November 9	Oakland	United States	Oakland Arena	Damian Marley	36,340 / 36,340	$3,638,620
November 13	Miami	United States	American Airlines Arena	Institute	37,354 / 37,354	$3,589,942
November 14	Miami	United States	American Airlines Arena	Institute	37,354 / 37,354	$3,589,942
November 16,	Tampa	United States	St. Pete Times Forum	Institute	19,354 / 19,354	$1,825,243
November 18	Atlanta	United States	Philips Arena	Institute	36,334 / 36,334	$3,500,572
November 19	Atlanta	United States	Philips Arena	Institute	36,334 / 36,334	$3,500,572
November 21	New York City	United States	Madison Square Garden	Patti Smith	37,314 / 37,314	$3,859,828
November 22	New York City	United States	Madison Square Garden	Patti Smith	37,314 / 37,314	$3,859,828
November 25	Ottawa	Canada	Corel Centre	Arcade Fire	18,647 / 18,647	$1,486,710
November 26	Montreal	Canada	Bell Centre	Arcade Fire	43,294 / 43,294	$3,575,491
November 28	Montreal	Canada	Bell Centre	Arcade Fire	43,294 / 43,294	$3,575,491
December 4	Boston	United States	TD Banknorth Garden	Institute	34,583 / 34,583	$3,400,861
December 5	Boston	United States	TD Banknorth Garden	Institute	34,583 / 34,583	$3,400,861
December 7	Hartford	United States	Hartford Civic Center	Institute	16,165 / 16,165	$1,542,471
December 9	Buffalo	United States	HSBC Arena	Institute	18,826 / 18,826	$1,711,094
December 10	Cleveland	United States	Quicken Loans Arena	Institute	19,765 / 19,765	$1,791,497
December 12	Charlotte	United States	Charlotte Bobcats Arena	Institute	17,804 / 17,804	$1,672,440
December 14	St. Louis	United States	Savvis Center	Kanye West	19,923 / 19,923	$1,839,020
December 15	Omaha	United States	Qwest Center Omaha	Kanye West	16,134 / 16,134	$1,500,834
December 17	Salt Lake City	United States	Delta Center	Kanye West	18,197 / 18,197	$1,709,317
December 19	Portland	United States	Rose Garden Arena	Kanye West	18,233 / 18,233	$1,670,879

List of 2006 concerts
Date (2006)	City	Country	Venue	Opening act	Attendance	Revenue
February 12	Monterrey	Mexico	Estadio Tecnológico	Secret Machines	50,347 / 50,347	$4,504,026
February 15	Mexico City	Mexico	Estadio Azteca	Secret Machines	141,278 / 141,278	$10,257,284
February 16	Mexico City	Mexico	Estadio Azteca	Secret Machines	141,278 / 141,278	$10,257,284
February 20	São Paulo	Brazil	Morumbi Stadium	Franz Ferdinand	149,700 / 149,700	$11,682,557
February 21	São Paulo	Brazil	Morumbi Stadium	Franz Ferdinand	149,700 / 149,700	$11,682,557
February 26	Santiago	Chile	Estadio Nacional	Franz Ferdinand	77,345 / 77,345	$5,000,589
March 1	Buenos Aires	Argentina	River Plate Stadium	Franz Ferdinand	150,424 / 150,424	$6,966,821
March 2	Buenos Aires	Argentina	River Plate Stadium	Franz Ferdinand	150,424 / 150,424	$6,966,821
November 7	Brisbane	Australia	Queensland Sport and Athletics Centre	Kanye West	53,480 / 53,480	$1,253,964
November 10	Sydney	Australia	Telstra Stadium	Kanye West	206,568 / 206,568	$18,538,724
November 11	Sydney	Australia	Telstra Stadium	Kanye West	206,568 / 206,568	$18,538,724
November 13	Sydney	Australia	Telstra Stadium	Kanye West	206,568 / 206,568	$18,538,724
November 16	Adelaide	Australia	AAMI Stadium	Kanye West	60,000 / 60,000	$5,058,962
November 18	Melbourne	Australia	Telstra Dome	Kanye West	127,275 / 127,275	$11,188,720
November 19	Melbourne	Australia	Telstra Dome	Kanye West	127,275 / 127,275	$11,188,720
November 24	Auckland	New Zealand	Ericsson Stadium	Kanye West	84,475 / 84,475	$6,216,819
November 25	Auckland	New Zealand	Ericsson Stadium	Kanye West	84,475 / 84,475	$6,216,819
November 29	Saitama	Japan	Saitama Super Arena	—N/a	57,158 / 57,158	$6,096,855
November 30	Saitama	Japan	Saitama Super Arena	—N/a	57,158 / 57,158	$6,096,855
December 4	Saitama	Japan	Saitama Super Arena	—N/a	57,158 / 57,158	$6,096,855
December 9	Honolulu	United States	Aloha Stadium	Pearl Jam; Rocco and the Devils	45,815 / 45,815	$4,486,532
Total					4,619,021 / 4,619,021 (100%)	$389,047,636

== See also ==
- Timeline of U2
- List of most-attended concert tours
