= City of Blinding Lights =

2005 single by U2

Single by U2

from the album How to Dismantle an Atomic Bomb
- B-side: "All Because of You" (Killahurtz Fly mix); "The Fly" (Live at Stop Sellafield); "Even Better Than the Real Thing" (Live at Stop Sellafield)
- Released: 6 June 2005
- Studio: Hanover Quay Studios (Dublin)
- Genre: Rock
- Length: 5:47 (album); 4:11 (single)
- Label: Island; Interscope
- Composer: U2
- Lyricist: Bono
- Producers: Flood; Chris Thomas (add.); Jacknife Lee (add.)

U2 singles chronology
"All Because of You" (2005)	"City of Blinding Lights" (2005)	"Sgt. Pepper's Lonely Hearts Club Band" (2005)

Music video
- "City of Blinding Lights" on YouTube

Audio sample
- file; help

"City of Blinding Lights" is a song by Irish rock band U2. It is the fifth track on their eleventh studio album, How to Dismantle an Atomic Bomb (2004), and was released as the album's fourth single on 6 June 2005. It was produced by Flood, with additional production by Chris Thomas and Jacknife Lee. The song reached number one in Spain, and peaked in the top ten in Canada, Ireland, the United Kingdom, and several other countries. The music video was shot at the General Motors Place in Vancouver, British Columbia, Canada.

The earliest incarnation of the song was developed during sessions for the band's 1997 album, Pop. The lyrics were written by the band's lead vocalist Bono, taking partial inspiration from his recollection of his first trip to London, and from the band's experience playing in New York City in the aftermath of the September 11 attacks during their Elevation Tour in 2001. Other lyrics refer to Bono's relationship with his wife Ali. The song's underlying theme reflects lost innocence and was inspired by an image Bono saw of himself from the early 1980s. The sound has been compared to the tone of U2's 1984 album, The Unforgettable Fire and their 1987 single "Where the Streets Have No Name".

"City of Blinding Lights" was well received by critics and won a Grammy Award for Best Rock Song at the 2006 ceremony. The song made its live debut on the group's 2005–2006 Vertigo Tour, when it was commonly played as the opening song. It has been performed at nearly every show from a U2 concert tour since. The track has been used in episodes of The Simpsons and Entourage, and in the film The Devil Wears Prada. Former U.S. President Barack Obama used the song at his campaign events during the 2008 and 2012 U.S. presidential elections, and listed it as one of his favourite songs; U2 performed it at his 2009 inaugural celebration at the Lincoln Memorial; and the song was used as Obama's entrance music for his acceptance speeches at the Democratic National Conventions of 2008 and 2012, as well as the speeches he delivered at the conventions of 2016 and 2024.

== Writing and inspiration ==
U2 developed "City of Blinding Lights" from a song called "Scott Walker", an outtake from the band's 1997 album Pop. This incarnation, written as an homage to the singer of the same name, was only an outline when the recording sessions for Pop concluded. The group reworked it in preparation for their 2000 album All That You Can't Leave Behind, but the song was still unfinished when that album was released. They rewrote the song for their 2004 album How to Dismantle an Atomic Bomb. Bassist Adam Clayton said, "There was a melody and a groove that ultimately didn't go anywhere and we kind of threw out everything, found chords that worked with that melody and built it back up, new drum parts, new bass parts, new guitars."

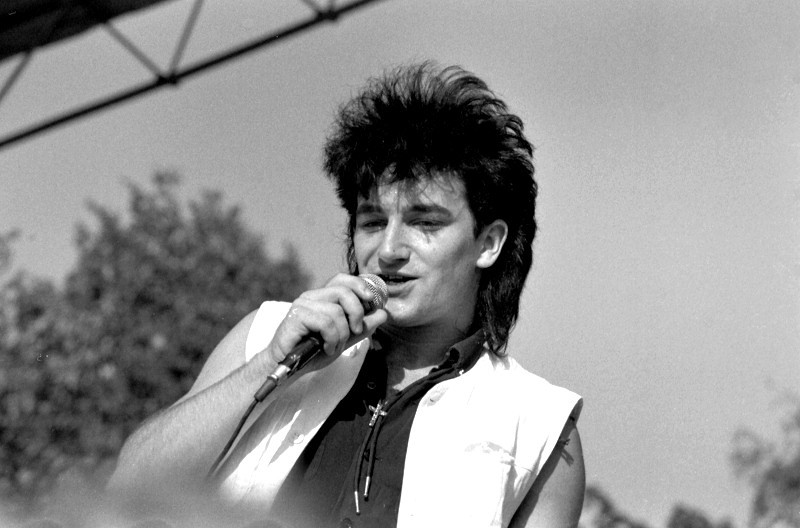
Bono performing in 1983. The song's theme of innocence was partially inspired by a photograph of the singer taken during the same era.

A photographic exhibition in the Netherlands by longtime band photographer Anton Corbijn served as a thematic inspiration for the song. Lead vocalist Bono saw an image of himself boarding a helicopter, taken in 1982 during filming of the music video for "New Year's Day". A journalist asked him what he would say to his younger self if given the chance; Bono replied, "I'd tell him he's absolutely right and stop second guessing himself." He explained his comments later, saying, "I realized how much I'd lost ... that way of looking at the world. There was such a clarity to it, but it was so defiant in a way."

The chorus was inspired by U2's first concert in New York City following the September 11 attacks during their 2001 Elevation Tour. When the lights illuminated the audience during a performance of "Where the Streets Have No Name", the band saw tears streaming down the faces of many fans. Upon seeing this raw release of emotion, Bono shouted, "Oh you look so beautiful tonight"; later, the band integrated the line into the chorus. The fans' passion, along with the resolve of the city following the attack, were the primary inspirations for many of the song's other lyrics.

== Composition and theme ==
"City of Blinding Lights" is played in common time at a tempo of 139 beats per minute in two keys: A♭ major in the verses, and E♭ major in the chorus.

"... 'Oh you look so beautiful tonight.' It is such a naïve and innocent line. That's what this song is about, remembering those times ... It's not necessarily a curse, it's that part of us is missing. It's about recapturing a sense of wonder, being in a city and reminding yourself that you don't have to lose your soul to gain the world."

— Bono, on "City of Blinding Lights"

The album version of the song runs for 5:47. It begins with a low note played on an electric guitar with heavy delay and distortion. The note is sustained for ten seconds as its harmonics gradually feed back. A pulsing rhythm guitar part with muted staccato chords by the Edge then begins underneath. After a further ten seconds it is joined by lower-register guitar drones played by the Edge, and a repetition of eight descending piano notes performed by the Edge and Bono. Forty-five seconds into the song, halfway through the introduction, Clayton's bass and percussion by drummer Larry Mullen Jr. fade into the song with producer Jacknife Lee's synthesizers, which play part of the melody line. The first verse begins at 1:20 and is accompanied by the bass, drums and rhythm guitar playing the chord progression A♭–E♭–D♭. This alters to B–D♭ in the pre-chorus, with a short harmony vocal line leading to the E♭–D♭ chorus.

After the second chorus, the lead guitar alternates with Bono's repeated "Time" into the B♭–A♭ bridge before returning to an extended chorus. The vocals range from D♭3 in the verses to a peak of C5 in the chorus. The Edge provides backing vocals in the second verse, the first three chorus lines, and the bridge lyric "Time won't leave me as I am / Time won't take the boy out of this man". There is no chorus after the third verse; instead, the track enters into a coda where, after restating the introductory piano theme, the guitar, bass, and drum parts come to a finish. The song concludes on a final reprise of the piano notes. The radio edit, with a run-time of 4:11, is 1:36 shorter than the album version. The introduction is half the length and the bass and drums enter after only two repetitions of the piano notes. The first two verses are kept intact but the bridge is shortened by seven seconds, removing two calls of "Time". The third verse is cut and the coda shortened by twenty seconds.

The sound of "City of Blinding Lights" has been compared to U2's 1987 single "Where the Streets Have No Name", prompted by a similar style of guitar playing, as well as to the atmospheric tone of the band's 1984 album The Unforgettable Fire. The melding of guitar and piano in the introduction was likened by the Edmonton Journal to the Coldplay song "Clocks". Rolling Stone described the song as "building into a bittersweet lament", while Uncut said it was "beautiful but slightly sinister", comparing the quality of the lyrics to the George Harrison song "The Inner Light".

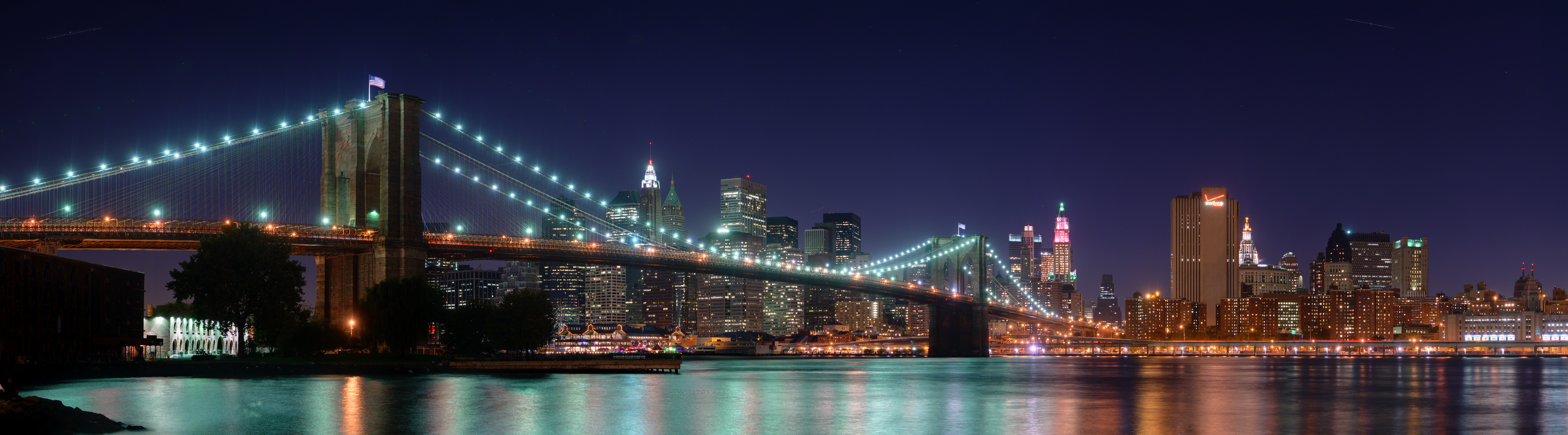
"... what it felt like to arrive here in the United States, come over the bridge into Manhattan ... a[n] amazing, magical time in our lives when we didn't know how powerful it was not to know." —Bono on the theme of innocence

The underlying theme of "City of Blinding Lights", reflected in the chorus, is lost innocence. The theme was reinforced during an impromptu concert at Empire–Fulton Ferry State Park under the Brooklyn Bridge; Bono introduced the song by reminiscing about the first time the band arrived in New York City, calling it "a song about innocence and naïvete." Bono developed the opening stanza from a memory of his first trip to London with his future wife, Alison Stewart, when they were teenagers. The experience of walking through Piccadilly Circus and along Wardour Street put him in mind of "discovering what a big city could offer you and what it could take away." Although the first verse is set in London, the chorus is set in New York City. The verse, "I've seen you walk unafraid / I've seen you in the clothes you've made / Can you see the beauty inside of me? / What happened to the beauty I had inside of me?" was written as an expression of love for Alison, with a reflection on their life together as they grow older.

Like many other U2 songs, "City of Blinding Lights" can be interpreted in a religious manner. Author Cameron Conant related the opening verse to the doubt he felt about his convictions on politics, marriage, and faith as he aged, concluding that a person's confidence in their beliefs makes it seem as if they know more than they do. Music critic Bill Friskics-Warren felt that the final line, "Blessings not just for the ones who kneel, luckily", was a way for Bono to berate himself for not praying enough, and was an attack on Christianity because "faith often perpetuates the misery and divisiveness that he decries." Steve Stockman, a chaplain at Queen's University of Belfast, believed the song was a metaphor for growing up, and that the final line meant that not just people of faith could be blessed.

== Release ==
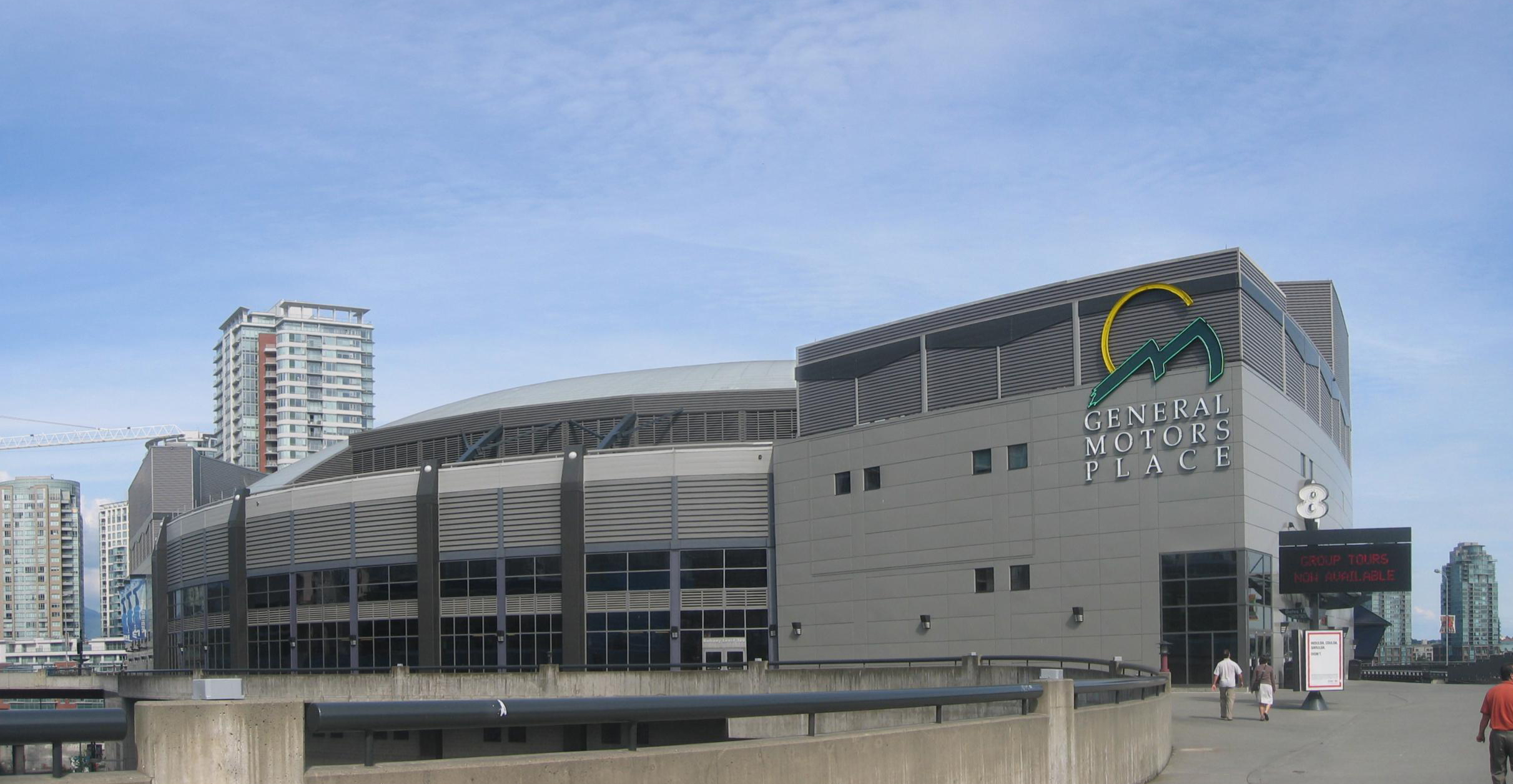
The music video was shot at GM Place in Vancouver.

Promotional singles were released in the United Kingdom and United States in April 2005. The UK release featured the "Paradise Soul" mix, Paul Epworth's "Phones P.D.A. in N.Y.C." mix, and the "Killahurtz Fly" mix of "All Because of You" on a 12-inch record, and the U.S. release contained the album version and the radio edit on a CD. "City of Blinding Lights" was released internationally as the fourth single from How to Dismantle an Atomic Bomb on 6 June 2005, following "Vertigo" in November 2004 and the joint release of "Sometimes You Can't Make It on Your Own" and "All Because of You" in February 2005.

Three major versions of the single were released, including two CD singles and one DVD single. Additionally, a mini CD single was released in Europe, and a separate CD single containing all four tracks from CD1 and CD2 was released in Japan. The "Hot Chip 2006" remix of the song was included on the 2010 compilation album Artificial Horizon.

=== B-sides ===
The Killahurtz Fly mix of "All Because of You" was remixed by the team of Mick Park and Lea Kenny. The song features additional bass and guitars played by Darren Murray. The live versions of "The Fly" and "Even Better Than the Real Thing" were recorded at the Stop Sellafield concert staged by Greenpeace at the G-Mex Centre in Manchester on 19 June 1992. Videos of these performances would later be included as bonus tracks on the DVD release of Zoo TV: Live from Sydney. The rendition of "Out of Control" was taken from a promotional concert, the band played at the Empire – Fulton Ferry State Park in Brooklyn, New York City on 22 November 2004; the live video of "City of Blinding Lights" on the DVD release was taken from the same concert. The music video for "Sometimes You Can't Make It on Your Own", directed by Phil Joanou, was also included on the DVD.

== Music video ==
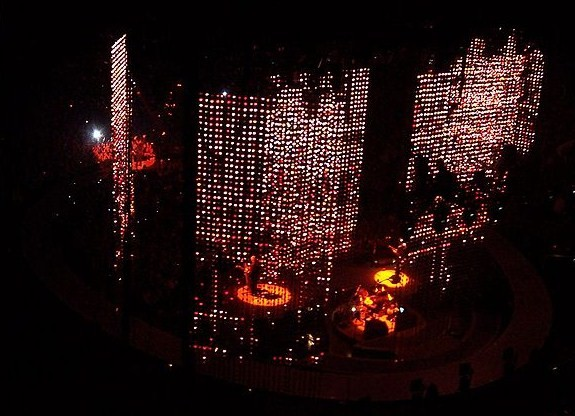
The visuals used on the Vertigo Tour were displayed in the music video.

The music video for "City of Blinding Lights" was shot at the General Motors Place in Vancouver, British Columbia on 27 April 2005, and was directed by Alex Courtes and Martin Fougerol. The video included additional footage from the band's Vertigo Tour concert of 28 April 2005. Planning for the project began as soon as U2 became aware the arena was available (a result of the NHL lockout of 2004–2005). Manager Paul McGuinness believed selecting Vancouver as the filming location made a lot of sense, saying, "[i]t's a world-renowned production centre. We knew we'd be able to get the crews and camera people and equipment here." Members of the public were invited to be part of the video via radio and internet announcements. Word of the shoot leaked before the official announcement, which led to fans lining up outside for the entire day. Between 3,000 and 5,000 people were allowed in for the filming. During the shoot, U2 performed "City of Blinding Lights" multiple times, followed by "Vertigo", "All Because of You" and "Sometimes You Can't Make It on Your Own".

The video shows the band playing the song on the Vertigo Tour concert stage. The live audio is kept to demonstrate the imperfections and emotion in the performance. The lighting is kept low, drawing attention to the visuals on the LED curtains used throughout the tour and obscuring much of the band members' facial features in shadow. Courtes and Fougerol explained: "we wanted to reflect the mood we've seen at the concerts, so we played with that lighting knowing that you are more blinded from a light if it was darker before".

== Live performances ==
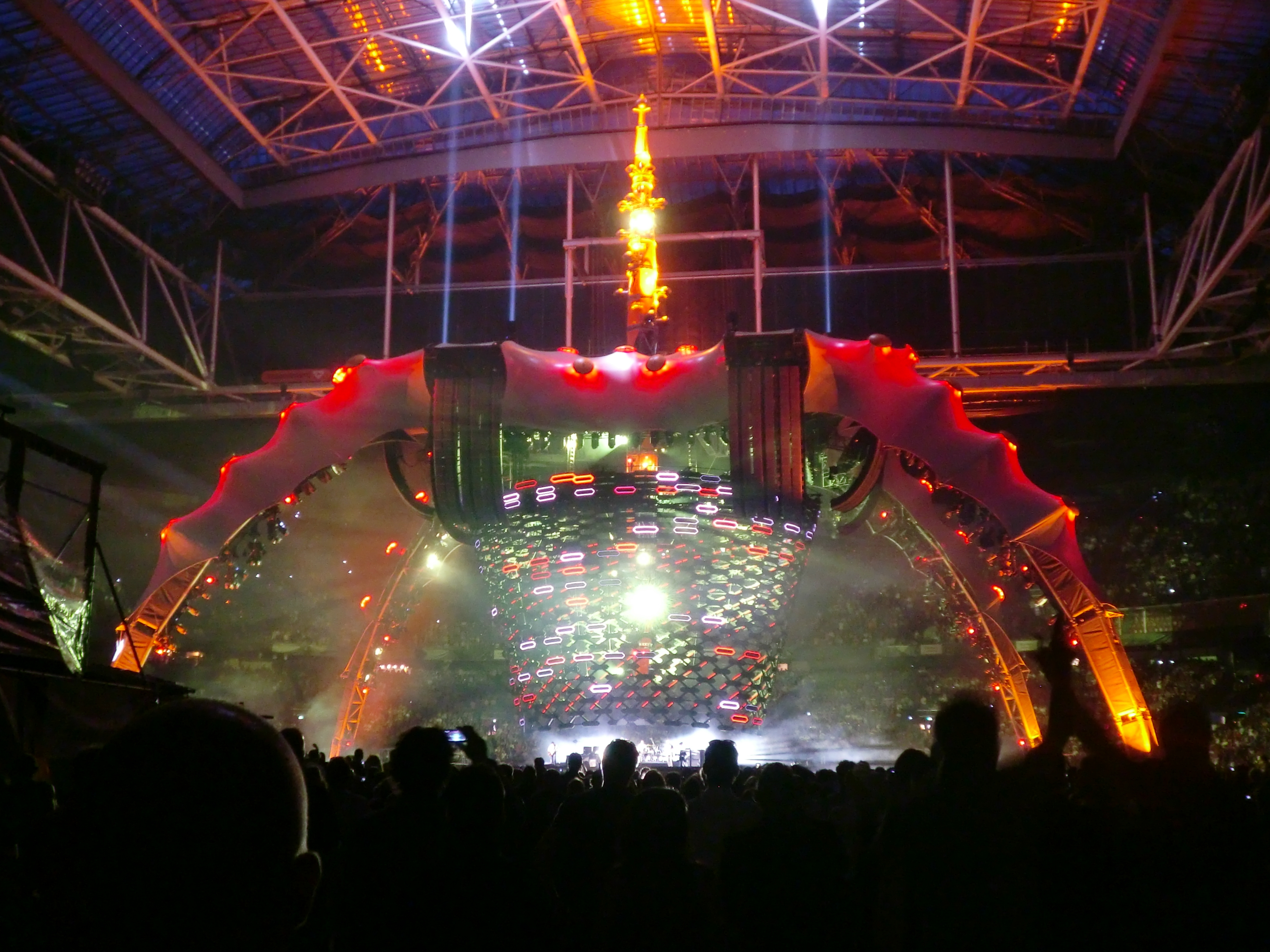
The stage effects of the U2 360° Tour reflect the LED curtain visuals from the Vertigo Tour.

"City of Blinding Lights" was performed on every night of the Vertigo Tour, opening 86 of the 131 concerts and a public dress rehearsal immediately before its launch. Performances frequently began with confetti falling from the ceiling, serving as a bridge to engage the audience. The song made extensive use of the stage's LED curtains for its visual effects; Wired noted that "they do a fine imitation of Shinjuku on speed, and the lighting design for 'City of Blinding Lights' takes advantage of that ... the visual effect manages to be far more that [sic] the sum of its parts." The Vancouver Sun described the result as "akin to a busy street at night through a misted windshield", later saying it provided "a theme for the night – the sparse, elegant stage was constantly bathed in vivid colours". During the Vertigo Tour, the piano introduction was played by Adam Clayton on a keyboard. Sound engineer Joe O'Herlihy believed Clayton's bass in the live setting to be "the driving implement that pushes the sound along".

"City of Blinding Lights" was played on every night of the U2 360° Tour, in each case appearing approximately halfway through the set. The lighting effects used on the U2 360° Tour video screen emulate the LED curtain visuals of the Vertigo Tour and were described as "psychedelic" by Edna Gundersen of USA Today. It is one of a handful of songs to utilize the fully descended video screen.

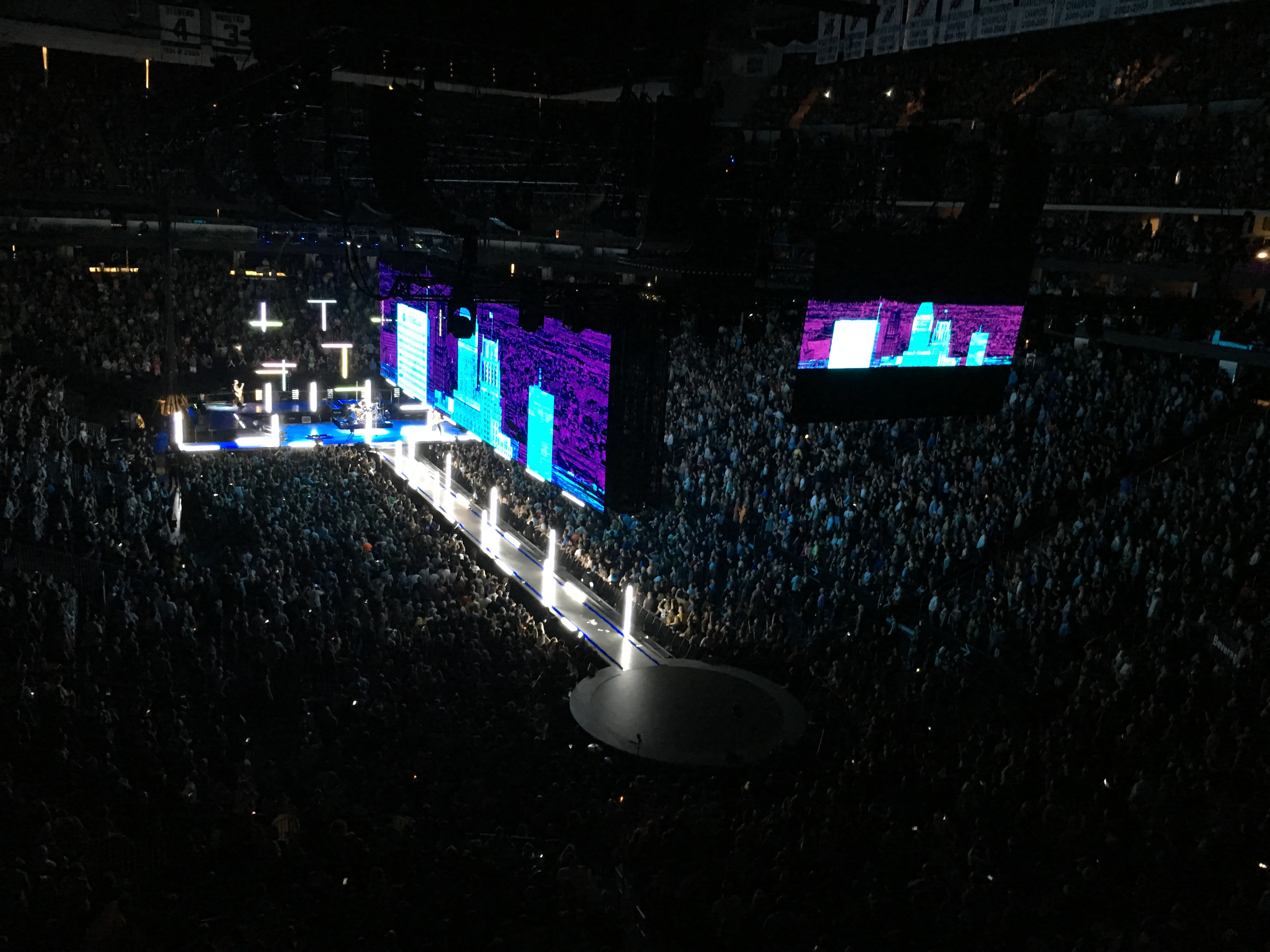
The stage presentation during the Innocence + Experience and Experience + Innocence Tours featured fluorescent tubes and cityscapes.

With the exception of two shows early in the tour, the song was played at every date of the 2015 Innocence + Experience Tour, typically opening the encore. The lighting effects utilised the numerous fluorescent tubes set around the stage, while the video screen showed cityscapes at night superimposed with the band members performances. The song reappeared in a regular slot closing out the main set of that tour's companion, the 2018 Experience + Innocence Tour, with a similar visual presentation. One reviewer called the presentation a "veritable explosion of light effects". The main set finale role held special importance due to the fact that all of the songs from The Joshua Tree, including "Where the Streets Have No Name", were removed from the Experience + Innocence Tour, having just been played in sequence during the intervening Joshua Tree Tour 2017. Clayton said, "I think ending [the main set] on 'City of Blinding Lights,' lyrically it has an interesting through line which relates to innocence, in a way. I mean, there is a reading of that ... in terms of saying goodbye to certain parts of yourself, that just connects [to the overall innocence and experience theme] in a way. And it's a lovely, contemporary, modern piece of music. We think that will take on some of the emotional weight of 'Streets'."

Live performances of the song appear on the DVDs Vertigo 2005: Live from Chicago and U2 360° at the Rose Bowl, the bonus disc of U218 Singles, and on the 2005 U2.com subscriber's release U2.COMmunication. The U2.COMmunication version is an audio rip of the performance from Vertigo 2005: Live from Chicago.

== Critical reception ==
"... Here was the original sadness and pounding melancholy of old U2, shot through with the same desperate craving. The band sounded twenty-five years old but at the same time reborn."

— Michka Assayas, on "City of Blinding Lights"

Reception to "City of Blinding Lights" was positive. Reviewing the album, Allmusic editor Stephen Thomas Erlewine said the song had "huge melodic and sonic hooks" and labelled it one of "the ingredients that make How to Dismantle an Atomic Bomb a very good U2 record." Entertainment Weekly felt the song demonstrated the band's ability to "make pop-chart lust work for them." Pitchfork Media reviewer Amanda Petrusich thought it was one of the album's highlights, calling it "an earnest and galactic fight song, and the sort of track that's best enjoyed in cars and airplanes, simply because it encites [sic] so much giddy movement."

PopMatters opined, "U2 sounds updated ... the bombast stays in check and Bono's questions sound earnest without being overzealous," though felt it "lack[s] the musical and lyrical guts of 'Pride (In the Name of Love)' or 'Sunday Bloody Sunday.'" Rating the song three stars out of five, Uncut reviewer Stephen Dalton wrote it was "indebted to the sky-punching peaks, grand vistas and monochrome emotions of the band's 1980s albums", deeming it a "heart-stirring anthem." Peter Murphy called it "the album's masterpiece" in his review for Hot Press, describing the opening as "little short of celestial." At the 48th Grammy Awards in 2006, "City of Blinding Lights" won the award for the Best Rock Song. In a 2010 survey conducted by fan site atU2.com, 1080 of 4814 participants (22.43%) labelled it their favourite song on the album, ranking it first on the list. Previous fan surveys in 2005, 2006, and 2007 had also ranked the song the most favoured from the album.

== Chart performance ==
"City of Blinding Lights" reached number two in the Canadian and Danish singles charts and peaked at number eight in Ireland. It charted in the Top 75 in the United Kingdom for nine weeks, peaking at number two and ranking number 113 on the year-end charts. In Spain, the song spent two weeks at number one on the Spanish Singles Chart, and remained there for a total of 16 weeks. In the Netherlands, the song peaked at number three, and spent 15 weeks on the chart. In Australia, the song peaked at number 31 on the Australian Singles Chart, and spent two weeks on the chart. In the United States it cracked the Billboard Adult Top 40 chart at number 40. Over 331,000 digital copies of the track have been sold as of June 2010.

== Legacy ==
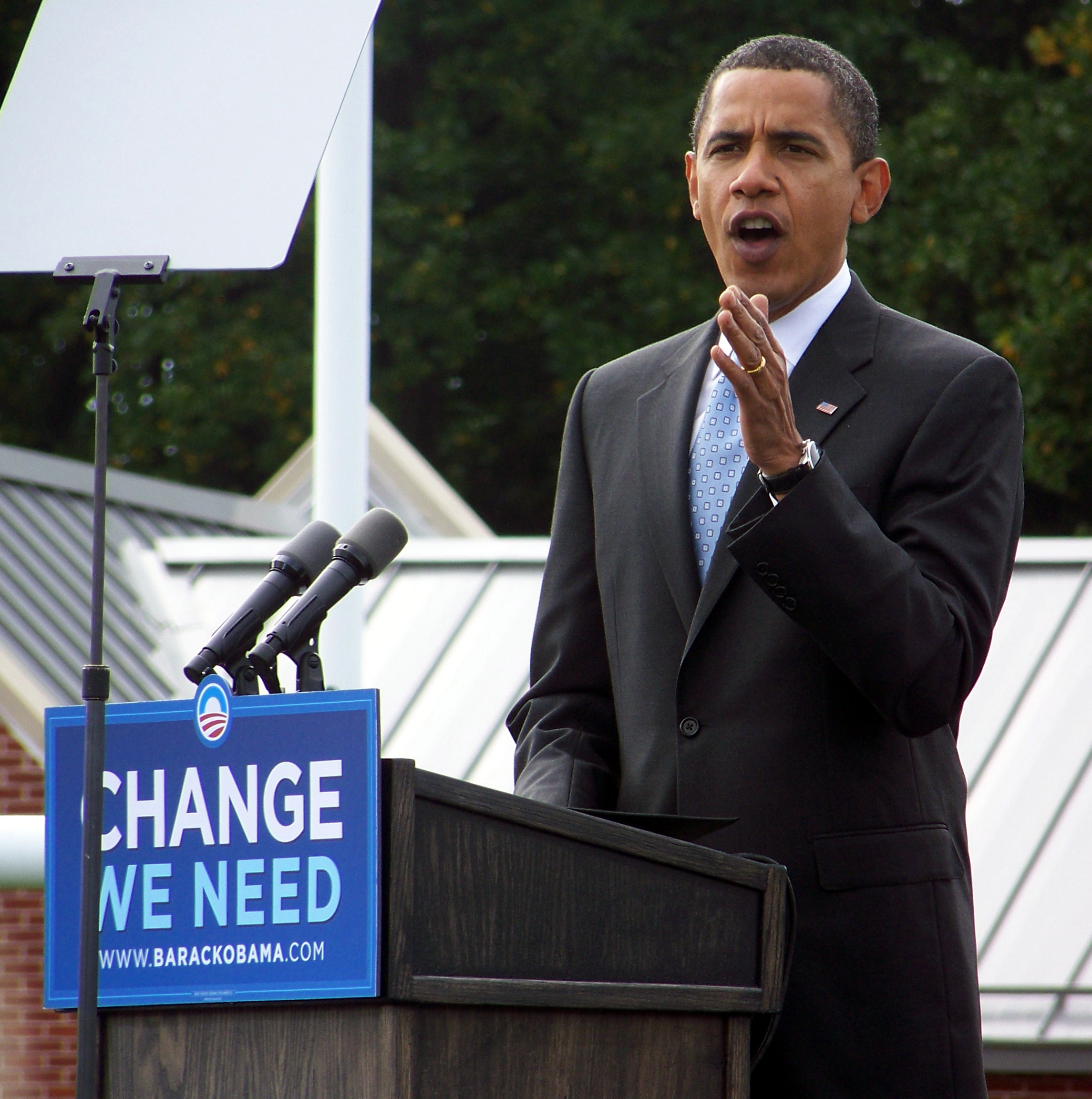
Barack Obama often used "City of Blinding Lights" as a lead-in for campaign events.

The song featured in the 2006 film The Devil Wears Prada during the scene where Andy arrives in Paris. Director David Frankel first used the song in a montage of pre-production scenes he shot on location in the city; the song fit the images so well that he decided to include it in the film. The film's use of the song was parodied in the 2009 The Simpsons episode "The Devil Wears Nada"; "City of Blinding Lights" is played briefly as Homer and Carl arrive in Paris. The song was featured in "I Love You Too", a 2005 episode of the HBO series Entourage. In the sequence, U2 performs the song at a concert and Bono wishes a happy birthday to Johnny Chase. American sports network ESPN used "City of Blinding Lights" in their 2006 FIFA World Cup television commercials; the piece, titled "Anthem", featured narration about the sport by Bono, which was set against a montage of children playing football across the globe and video of the band in concert. ESPN used the track for a second time in January 2010 in commercials for the 2010 FIFA World Cup, causing weekly online sales of the track to double from the month prior. In 2008, NASA used "City of Blinding Lights" for the fourth wake up call of STS-126. The song was played for Mission Specialist Shane Kimbrough. The song was used again on 3 March 2011 for the eighth wake up call of STS-133; it was played for all of the crew members.

The track was used by Barack Obama as the entrance theme for his presidential candidacy announcement in Springfield, Illinois, on 10 February 2007, and it was played before his acceptance speech at the 2008 Democratic National Convention. Obama frequently used it as the lead-in as he took the stage for campaign events during the 2008 U.S. presidential election, a spectacle that even convinced one student to vote for him, and played it on primary night rallies with supporters. In August 2008, Obama listed "City of Blinding Lights" as one of his ten favourite songs. The song was valuable for its global image, ringing guitar line, and suggestions of awakening.

U2 performed the song, along with "Pride (In the Name of Love)", to upwards of 400,000 people on 18 January 2009 at the We Are One concert at the Lincoln Memorial to celebrate the upcoming inauguration of Obama. Introducing "City of Blinding Lights", which the band were asked to play, Bono spoke directly to Obama, saying, "What a thrill for four Irish boys from the northside of Dublin to honour you, sir, the next President of the United States, Barack Obama, for choosing this song to be part of the soundtrack of your campaign, and more besides." Bono modified the first verse to reference the surroundings, singing "America, let your road rise / Under Lincoln's unblinking eyes" in place of "Neon hearts, dayglo eyes / A city lit by fireflies," gave a shout-out to vice presidential inauguree Joe Biden at the end of the verse, and changed a part of the chorus to proclaim "America's getting ready to leave the ground."

== Formats and track listings ==
All music is composed by U2.

CD 1
No.	Title	Lyrics	Length
1.	"City of Blinding Lights" (Radio edit)	Bono	4:11
2.	"All Because of You" (Killahurtz Fly mix)	Bono	5:40
Total length:			9:51

CD 2
No.	Title	Lyrics	Length
1.	"City of Blinding Lights" (Radio edit)	Bono	4:11
2.	"The Fly" (Live at Stop Sellafield, Sellafield, Cumbria, England, 1992)	U2	4:38
3.	"Even Better Than the Real Thing" (Live at Stop Sellafield, Sellafield, Cumbria, England, 1992)	U2	3:50
Total length:			12:39

Mini-CD
No.	Title	Lyrics	Length
1.	"City of Blinding Lights" (Radio edit)	Bono	4:11
2.	"Out of Control" (Live at the Brooklyn Bridge, Manhattan, New York City, New York, 22 November 2004)	U2	5:05
Total length:			9:16

Japan CD
No.	Title	Lyrics	Length
1.	"City of Blinding Lights" (Radio edit)	Bono	4:11
2.	"The Fly" (Live at Stop Sellafield, Sellafield, Cumbria, England, 1992)	U2	4:38
3.	"Even Better Than the Real Thing" (Live at Stop Sellafield, Sellafield, Cumbria, England, 1992)	U2	3:50
4.	"All Because of You" (Killahurtz Fly mix)	Bono	5:40
Total length:			18:19

DVD
No.	Title	Lyrics	Length
1.	"City of Blinding Lights" (Live at the Brooklyn Bridge, Manhattan, New York City, New York, 22 November 2004 – Video)	Bono	6:53
2.	"Sometimes You Can't Make It on Your Own" (Video)	Bono	4:40
3.	"City of Blinding Lights" (Audio only)	Bono	5:46
Total length:			17:23

== Personnel ==
U2

- Bono – vocals, piano
- The Edge – guitar, backing vocals, piano
- Adam Clayton – bass guitar
- Larry Mullen Jr. – drums, percussion

Additional performers

- Jacknife Lee – synthesizers

Technical

- Production – Flood
- Additional production – Chris Thomas, Jacknife Lee
- Recording – Carl Glanville
- Recording assistance – Chris Heaney, Kieran Lynch
- Mixing – Nellee Hooper
- Mix engineering – Greg Collins, Simon Gogerly
- Mix engineering assistance – Ian Rossiter
- Programming – Fabien Waltmann

== Charts ==
=== Weekly charts ===
Chart (2005)	Peak position
Australia (ARIA)	31
Austria (Ö3 Austria Top 40)	28
Belgium (Ultratop 50 Flanders)	29
Belgium (Ultratop 50 Wallonia)	23
Canada (Nielsen SoundScan)	2
Canada Rock Top 30 (Radio & Records)	12
Denmark (Tracklisten)	2
Europe (Eurochart Hot 100)	7
France (SNEP)	89
Germany (GfK)	24
Ireland (IRMA)	8
Italy (FIMI)	5
Netherlands (Dutch Top 40)	3
Netherlands (Single Top 100)	3
Scottish Singles Sales (Official Charts)	2
Spain (Promusicae)	1
Sweden (Sverigetopplistan)	8
Switzerland (Schweizer Hitparade)	41
UK Singles (Official Charts)	2
US Adult Pop Airplay (Billboard)	40
US Triple A (Billboard)	3

=== Year-end charts ===
Chart (2005)	Position
Netherlands (Dutch Top 40)	38
Netherlands (Single Top 100)	62
UK Singles (OCC)	113
US Triple-A (Billboard)	9

== See also ==
- Covers of "City of Blinding Lights"
- List of number-one singles of 2005 (Spain)
