= U218 Singles =

2006 greatest hits album by U2

Greatest hits album by U2
- Released: 20 November 2006
- Recorded: 1980–2006, new material recorded in September 2006 with Rick Rubin in France and at Abbey Road Studios
- Genres: Post-punk; roots rock; alternative rock
- Length: 74:35
- Labels: Mercury; Interscope
- Producers: Steve Lillywhite; Brian Eno; Daniel Lanois; Jimmy Iovine; Jacknife Lee; Rick Rubin

U2 chronology
U218 Videos (2006)	U218 Singles (2006)	Vertigo 05: Live from Milan (2006)

Singles from U218 Singles
- 1. "The Saints Are Coming" Released: 31 October 2006; 2. "Window in the Skies" Released: 1 January 2007

Professional ratings
Review scores
Source	Rating
Allmusic	4/5 stars
Entertainment Weekly	B−
Pitchfork	7.0/10
Rolling Stone	4/5 stars

U218 Singles is a greatest hits album by Irish rock band U2, released in November 2006. In most markets, the album contains 18 songs: 16 of their most successful and popular singles, and two new songs. The 17th track is a cover version of the Skids' "The Saints Are Coming", recorded with Green Day to benefit Hurricane Katrina charities. The 18th and closing track was a new song entitled "Window in the Skies". In some markets such as the United Kingdom, an extra song, "I Will Follow", was included as the opening track. A DVD compilation of music videos from throughout the group's career entitled U218 Videos was released concurrent to U218 Singles.

The album debuted on the Billboard 200 albums chart on 9 December 2006 at number 12 with sales of 134,000 copies. It spent 45 weeks on the chart. Despite not being released until November 2006, it was the seventh-highest-selling album in the world that year.

== Artwork and packaging ==
The art direction and design for U218 Singles was handled by Shaughn McGrath. Many different photographs were used in the album's packaging with front and back cover photographs taken by David Corio and Anton Corbijn, respectively with booklet photographs by Corbijn, Paul Slattery, Andrew McPherson, Colm Henry, Matt Mahurin, Pennie Smith, and Sheila Rock. Corio's front cover photograph shows the band on the roof of the Country Club Hotel, in Cork, Ireland in February 1980.

== Track listing ==
No.	Title	From the album:	Length
1.	"Beautiful Day"	All That You Can't Leave Behind (2000)	4:05
2.	"I Still Haven't Found What I'm Looking For"	The Joshua Tree (1987)	4:38
3.	"Pride (In the Name of Love)"	The Unforgettable Fire (1984)	3:48
4.	"With or Without You"	The Joshua Tree	4:56
5.	"Vertigo"	How to Dismantle an Atomic Bomb (2004)	3:10
6.	"New Year's Day" (Japanese single version)	War (1983)	4:17
7.	"Mysterious Ways"	Achtung Baby (1991)	4:02
8.	"Stuck in a Moment You Can't Get Out Of"	All That You Can't Leave Behind	4:31
9.	"Where the Streets Have No Name" (Single version)	The Joshua Tree	4:46
10.	"Sweetest Thing" (Single mix)	The Best of 1980–1990 (1998)	3:00
11.	"Sunday Bloody Sunday"	War	4:40
12.	"One"	Achtung Baby	4:35
13.	"Desire"	Rattle and Hum (1988)	2:59
14.	"Walk On" (Edited version)	All That You Can't Leave Behind	4:26
15.	"Elevation"	All That You Can't Leave Behind	3:47
16.	"Sometimes You Can't Make It on Your Own"	How to Dismantle an Atomic Bomb	5:05
17.	"The Saints Are Coming" (with Green Day)	New song; originally by Skids from Scared to Dance	3:21
18.	"Window in the Skies"	New song	4:08
Total length:			74:35

UK, Australia, New Zealand, and Japan only
No.	Title	From the album:	Length
1.	"I Will Follow"	Boy (1980)	3:36
Total length:			78:15

No songs from October (1981), Zooropa (1993), Pop (1997), or the Passengers (U2 & Brian Eno) project Original Soundtracks 1 (1995) are included.

== Variations ==
A limited edition version includes a live DVD featuring ten songs recorded on the Vertigo Tour in Milan. "I Will Follow" appears as a bonus track on UK and Australian editions of the CD. The deluxe version in the UK, Ireland, and Canadian iTunes Stores also contains nine of the live songs from the limited-edition bonus disc as audio tracks, as well as a digital booklet and a bonus track, "Smile," for those who pre-ordered the album. The United States deluxe iTunes version does not come with a digital booklet, but instead with "Smile" as a bonus track even if it was not pre-ordered.

== Vertigo 05: Live from Milan DVD ==
Vertigo 05: Live from Milan

Video by U2
- Released: 20 November 2006
- Recorded: 21 July 2005
- Venues: San Siro (Milan, Italy)
- Genre: Rock
- Length: 57 minutes
- Labels: Mercury, Interscope
- Director: Hamish Hamilton
- Producer: Ned O'Hanlon

U2 chronology
U218 Singles (2006)	Vertigo 05: Live from Milan (2006)	Live from Paris (2007)

Vertigo 05: Live from Milan is a concert film included as a bonus DVD in the deluxe edition of U218 Singles. The DVD features ten songs from the band's 25-song concert on 21 July 2005 in Milan, Italy, during the Vertigo Tour. It is U2's second concert release from the tour, preceded by Vertigo 2005: Live from Chicago and followed by U2 3D. On the iTunes Store deluxe edition of the album, these songs are featured as bonus audio tracks, except for "Original of the Species", which was later released as an iTunes Store exclusive single.

=== Track listing ===
1. "Vertigo"
2. "I Will Follow"
3. "Elevation"
4. "I Still Haven't Found What I'm Looking For"
5. "All I Want Is You"
6. "City of Blinding Lights"
7. "Sometimes You Can't Make It on Your Own"
8. "Miss Sarajevo"
9. "Original of the Species"
10. "With or Without You"

=== Audio ===
- PCM Stereo
- Dolby Digital 5.1
- DTS 5.1

== Charts ==
=== Weekly charts ===
Chart (2006–2007)	Peak position
Australian Albums (ARIA)	1
Austrian Albums (Ö3 Austria)	2
Belgian Albums (Ultratop Flanders)	2
Belgian Albums (Ultratop Wallonia)	6
Canadian Albums (Billboard)	3
Danish Albums (Hitlisten)	3
Dutch Albums (Album Top 100)	3
Finnish Albums (Suomen virallinen lista)	10
French Albums (SNEP)	108
German Albums (Offizielle Top 100)	5
Greek Albums (IFPI)	6
Hungarian Albums (MAHASZ)	4
Irish Albums (IRMA)	1
Italian Albums (FIMI)	4
Japanese Albums (Oricon)	9
Mexican Albums (Top 100 Mexico)	5
New Zealand Albums (RMNZ)	1
Norwegian Albums (VG-lista)	5
Polish Albums (ZPAV)	4
Portuguese Albums (AFP)	2
Scottish Albums (Official Charts)	4
Spanish Albums (Promusicae)	2
Swedish Albums (Sverigetopplistan)	4
Swiss Albums (Schweizer Hitparade)	1
UK Albums (Official Charts)	4
US Billboard 200	12
US Top Rock Albums (Billboard)	3
US Indie Store Album Sales (Billboard)	10

Chart (2018)	Position
Czech Albums (ČNS IFPI)	80

=== Year-end charts ===
Chart (2006)	Position
Australian Albums (ARIA)	12
Austrian Albums (Ö3 Austria)	48
Belgian Albums (Ultratop Flanders)	41
Belgian Albums (Ultratop Wallonia)	59
Dutch Albums (Album Top 100)	38
Greek Albums (IFPI)	37
Greek Foreign Albums (IFPI)	7
Hungarian Albums (MAHASZ)	37
Irish Albums (IRMA)	5
Italian Albums (FIMI)	10
Mexican Albums (Top 100 Mexico)	62
New Zealand Albums (RMNZ)	14
Spanish Albums (PROMUSICAE)	37
Swedish Albums (Sverigetopplistan)	21
Swiss Albums (Schweizer Hitparade)	33
UK Albums (OCC)	19

Chart (2007)	Position
Australian Albums (ARIA)	74
Austrian Albums (Ö3 Austria)	40
Belgian Albums (Ultratop Flanders)	83
Belgian Albums (Ultratop Wallonia)	94
Dutch Albums (Album Top 100)	36
European Albums (Billboard)	15
German Albums (Offizielle Top 100)	76
Hungarian Albums (MAHASZ)	48
Italian Albums (FIMI)	36
Mexican Albums (Top 100 Mexico)	38
New Zealand Albums (RMNZ)	37
Spanish Albums (PROMUSICAE)	36
Swedish Albums (Sverigetopplistan)	100
Swiss Albums (Schweizer Hitparade)	95
UK Albums (OCC)	115
US Billboard 200	60
US Top Rock Albums (Billboard)	13

Chart (2010)	Position
Russian Albums (2M)	85

Chart (2021)	Position
Irish Albums (IRMA)	41

=== Decade-end charts ===
Chart (2000–09)	Position
Australian Albums (ARIA)	92

== Certifications and sales ==
Region	Certification	Certified units/sales
Argentina (CAPIF)	Platinum	40,000^{^}
Australia (ARIA)	5× Platinum	350,000^{^}
Belgium (BRMA)	Platinum	50,000^{*}
Brazil (Pro-Música Brasil)	Platinum	60,000^{*}
Canada (Music Canada)	Platinum	100,000^{^}
Denmark (IFPI Danmark)	Platinum	40,000^{^}
Germany (BVMI)	Platinum	200,000^{^}
Greece (IFPI Greece)	Platinum	15,000^{^}
Hungary (MAHASZ)	Platinum	6,000^{^}
Ireland (IRMA)	6× Platinum	90,000^{^}
Italy sales in 2006	—	250,000
Italy (FIMI) sales since 2009	Platinum	50,000^{‡}
Japan (RIAJ)	Gold	100,000^{^}
Mexico (AMPROFON)	Gold	50,000^{^}
Netherlands (NVPI)	Gold	35,000^{^}
New Zealand (RMNZ)	4× Platinum	60,000^{^}
Poland (ZPAV)	2× Platinum	40,000^{*}
Portugal (AFP)	Platinum	20,000^{^}
Russia (NFPF)	Platinum	20,000^{*}
Spain (Promusicae)	Platinum	80,000^{^}
Switzerland (IFPI Switzerland)	Platinum	30,000^{^}
United Kingdom (BPI)	5× Platinum	1,500,000^{‡}
Summaries
Europe (IFPI)	2× Platinum	2,000,000^{*}
^{*} Sales figures based on certification alone.^{^} Shipments figures based on certification alone.^{‡} Sales+streaming figures based on certification alone.
