= U218 Videos =

2006 video compilation by U2

Video by U2
- Released: 17 November 2006
- Recorded: 1983–2005
- Genre: Rock
- Length: 149 mins
- Labels: Mercury; Interscope
- Producer: Ned O'Hanlon

U2 chronology
Zoo TV Live (2006)	U218 Videos (2006)	U218 Singles (2006)

U218 Videos is a music video compilation DVD by U2 from 2006, released the same day as its companion compilation album U218 Singles. The video collection features their most popular videos, beginning with "New Year's Day" in 1983 and ending with "The Saints Are Coming" in 2006. The DVD features videos from the band's two previous music video compilations, The Best of 1980–1990 and The Best of 1990–2000, as well as several videos that have never been previously released. The main section of the DVD contains 19 videos, including two videos for both "Stuck in a Moment You Can't Get Out Of" and "Walk On". The DVD also contains bonus material with two documentaries, The Making of "Vertigo" and A Story of One, as well as seven additional music videos.

== Track listing ==
1. "Beautiful Day" (All That You Can't Leave Behind, September 2000)
  - Directed by Jonas Åkerlund
2. "I Still Haven't Found What I'm Looking For" (The Joshua Tree, May 1987)
  - Directed by Barry Devlin
3. "Pride (In the Name of Love)" (The Unforgettable Fire, November 1984)
  - Directed by Donald Cammell
4. "With or Without You" (The Joshua Tree, March 1987)
  - Directed by Meiert Avis
5. "Vertigo" (How to Dismantle an Atomic Bomb, November 2004)
  - Directed by Alex and Martin
6. "New Year's Day" (War, January 1983)
  - Directed by Meiert Avis
7. "Mysterious Ways" (Achtung Baby, November 1991)
  - Directed by Stéphane Sednaoui
8. "Stuck in a Moment You Can't Get Out Of" (U.S. version) (All That You Can't Leave Behind, January 2001)
  - Directed by Joseph Kahn
9. "Stuck in a Moment You Can't Get Out Of" (International version)
  - Directed by Kevin Godley
10. "Where the Streets Have No Name" (The Joshua Tree, August 1987)
  - Directed by Meiert Avis
11. "Sweetest Thing" (The Best of 1980–1990, November 1998)
  - Directed by Kevin Godley
12. "Sunday Bloody Sunday" (War, March 1983)
  - Directed by Gavin Taylor (U2 Live at Red Rocks: Under a Blood Red Sky)
13. "One" (Achtung Baby, March 1992)
  - Directed by Anton Corbijn
14. "Desire" (Rattle and Hum, September 1988)
  - Directed by Richard Lowenstein
15. "Walk On" (International version) (All That You Can't Leave Behind, November 2001)
  - Directed by Jonas Åkerlund
16. "Walk On" (U.S. version)
  - Directed by Liz Friedlander
17. "Elevation" (All That You Can't Leave Behind, July 2001)
  - Directed by Joseph Kahn
18. "Sometimes You Can't Make It on Your Own" (How to Dismantle an Atomic Bomb, February 2005)
  - Directed by Phil Joanou
19. "The Saints Are Coming" (U218 Singles, October 2006) (Live version)
  - Directed by Chris Milk

=== Extras ===
1. The Making of "Vertigo" (Documentary)
2. A Story of One (Documentary)
3. "Beautiful Day" (Èze version)
4. "Pride (In the Name of Love)" (Slane Castle version)
5. "Vertigo" (Lisbon version)
6. "Vertigo" (HQ version)
7. "One" (Buffalo version)
8. "One" (Restaurant version)
9. "Sometimes You Can't Make It on Your Own" (Single take version)

== Charts and certifications ==
Chart (2006)	Peak position
Australian Top 40 Music DVDs	3
Austrian Top 10 DVDs Chart	2
Danish Top 10 Music DVDs	8
Italian Top 20 Music DVDs	3
New Zealand Top 10 Music DVDs	1
Norwegian Top 10 DVDs	6
Swedish Top 20 DVDs	4

Region	Certification	Certified units/sales
Argentina (CAPIF)	Platinum	8,000^{^}
Australia (ARIA)	2× Platinum	30,000^{^}
Brazil (Pro-Música Brasil)	Platinum	30,000^{*}
Italy	—	12,000
New Zealand (RMNZ)	Platinum	5,000^{^}
^{*} Sales figures based on certification alone.^{^} Shipments figures based on certification alone.
