= List of awards and nominations received by U2 =

U2 awards and nominations
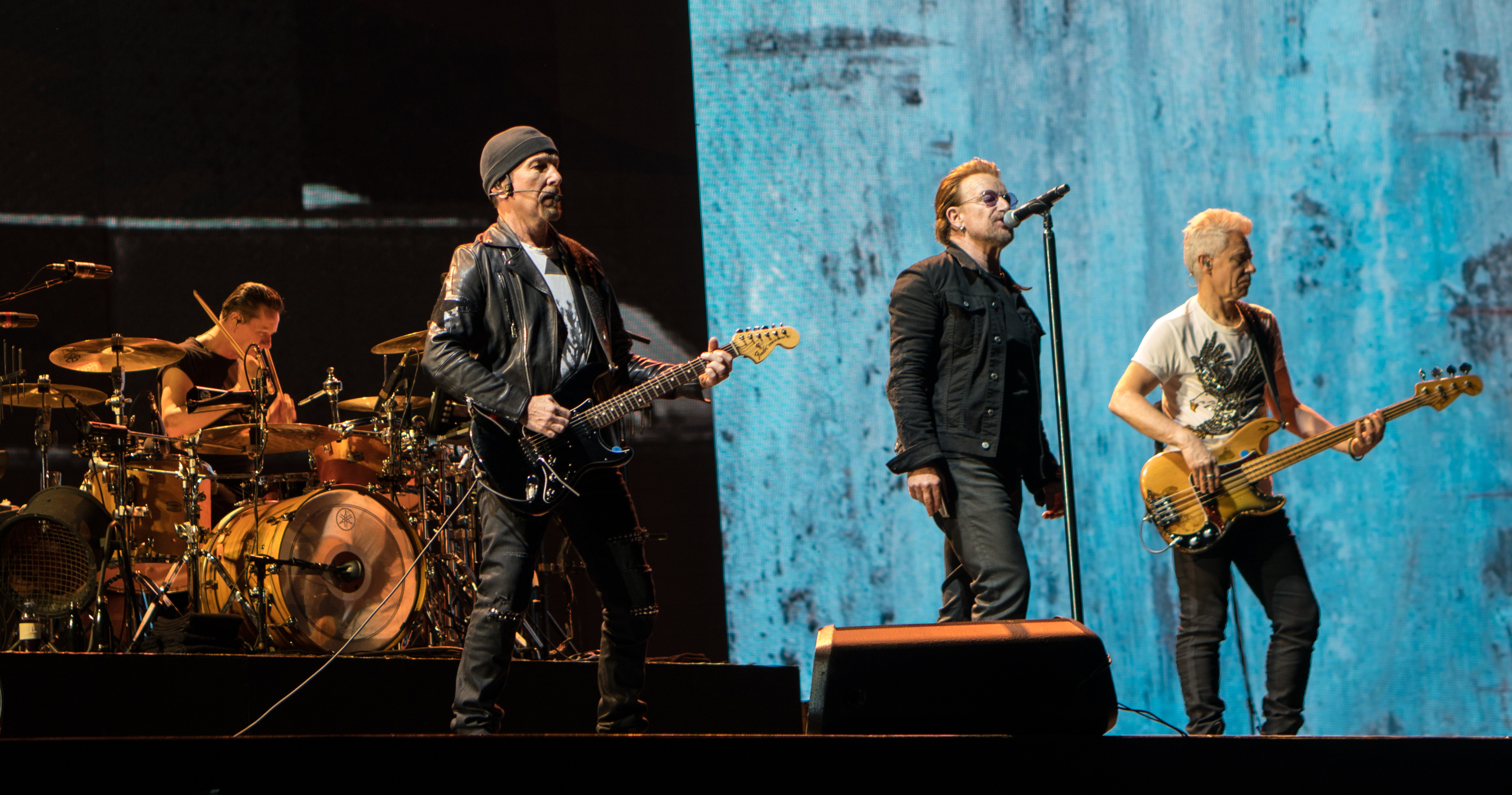
- U2 at the Joshua Tree Tour 2017
Awards and nominations
Award	Wins	Nominations
Academy Awards	0	2
American Music Awards	1	10
Billboard Music Awards	10	16
Billboard Touring Awards	9	12
Brit Awards	8	20
Golden Globe Awards	2	5
Grammy Awards	22	47
iHeartRadio Music Awards	2	3
Ivor Novello Awards	4	6
Juno Awards	2	6
MTV Europe Music Awards	7	23
MTV Video Music Awards	6	39
NME Awards	10	10
NRJ Music Awards	1	1
Q Awards	15	15
Rock and Roll Hall of Fame	Inductee	1

Totals (Note: Certain award groups do not simply award one winner. They acknowledge several different recipients, have runners-up, and have third place. Since this is a specific recognition and is different from losing an award, runner-up mentions are considered wins in this award tally. For simplification and to avoid errors, each award in this list has been presumed to have had a prior nomination.)
- Wins: 150
- Nominations: 314

This is a comprehensive list of major music awards received by U2, an Irish rock band that formed in 1976, and whose members are Bono, the Edge, Adam Clayton, and Larry Mullen Jr. U2 have been one of the most popular acts in the world since the mid-1980s. The band has sold more than 170 million albums worldwide and has won 22 Grammy Awards, more than any other band.

U2 formed in 1976 when the members were teenagers with limited musical proficiency. By the mid-1980s, however, the band had become a top international act, noted for its anthemic sound, Bono's impassioned vocals, and The Edge's textural guitar playing. Their success as a live act was greater than their success as a record-selling act until their 1987 album, The Joshua Tree, which brought them mega-stardom.

== Academy Awards ==
The Academy Awards is an annual American awards ceremony hosted by the Academy of Motion Picture Arts and Sciences to recognize excellence in cinematic achievements in the United States film industry as assessed by the academy's voting membership.

Year	Song	Film	Award	Result
2003	"The Hands That Built America"	Gangs of New York	Best Original Song	Nominated
2014	"Ordinary Love"	Mandela: Long Walk to Freedom	Best Original Song	Nominated

== American Music Awards ==
The American Music Awards is an annual American music awards show.

Year	Nominee / work	Award	Result
1988	The Joshua Tree	Favorite Pop/Rock Album	Nominated
1988	U2	Favorite Pop/Rock Band/Duo/Group	Nominated
1993	Achtung Baby	Favorite Pop/Rock Album	Nominated
1993	U2	Favorite Pop/Rock Band/Duo/Group	Nominated
1994	U2	Favorite Pop/Rock Band/Duo/Group	Nominated
1998	U2	Favorite Pop/Rock Band/Duo/Group	Nominated
2002	U2	Artist of the Year	Won
2002	U2	Favorite Pop/Rock Band/Duo/Group	Nominated
2017	The Joshua Tree Tour 2017	Tour of the Year	Nominated
2018	Experience + Innocence Tour	Tour of the Year	Nominated

== Billboard Music Award ==
The Billboard Music Awards are sponsored by Billboard magazine and are held annually in December. The awards are based on sales data by Nielsen SoundScan and radio information by Nielsen Broadcast Data Systems. U2 has nine awards from sixteen nominations.

Year	Nominee / work	Award	Result
1992	U2	No. 1 Album Rock Tracks Artist	Won
1992	U2	No. 1 Modern Rock Tracks Artist	Won
1992	U2	No. 1 Boxscore Tour	Won
1992	"Mysterious Ways"	No. 1 Album Rock Track	Won
1992	"One"	No. 1 Modern Rock Track	Won
2005	U2	Century Award	Won
2011	U2	Top Duo/Group	Nominated
2011	U2	Top Touring Artist	Won
2012	U2	Top Touring Artist	Won
2016	U2	Top Touring Artist	Nominated
2016	U2	Top Duo/Group	Nominated
2018	U2	Top Touring Artist	Won
2018	U2	Top Rock Tour	Won
2018	U2	Top Duo/Group	Nominated
2018	Songs of Experience	Top Rock Album	Nominated
2019	Experience + Innocence Tour	Top Rock Tour	Nominated

== Billboard Touring Awards ==
The Billboard Touring Awards is an annual meeting sponsored by Billboard magazine which also honors the top international live entertainment industry artists and professionals. It was established in 2004. In 1992, U2 won No. 1 Album Tracks Artist at the Billboard Music Award for "Mysterious Ways".

Year	Nominee / work	Award	Result
2005	Vertigo Tour	Top Tour	Won
2005	Vertigo Tour	Top Draw	Won
2005	Vertigo Tour	Top Boxscore	Won
2009	U2 360° Tour	Top Boxscore	Won
2010	U2 360° Tour	Top Tour	Won
2010	U2 360° Tour	Top Draw	Won
2011	U2 360° Tour	Top Tour	Won
2011	U2 360° Tour	Top Draw	Won
2015	Innocence + Experience Tour (Madison Square Garden, July 18–31, 2015)	Top Boxscore	Nominated
2017	The Joshua Tree Tour 2017	Top Boxscore	Won
2017	The Joshua Tree Tour 2017	Top Tour	Nominated
2017	The Joshua Tree Tour 2017	Top Draw	Nominated

== Brit Awards ==
The Brit Awards are awarded annually by the British Phonographic Industry.

Year	Nominee / work	Award	Result
1985	The Unforgettable Fire	British Album of the Year	Nominated
1985	U2	British Group	Nominated
1986	U2	British Group	Nominated
1988	U2	International Group	Won
1989	U2	International Group	Won
1989	Rattle and Hum	Soundtrack/Cast Recording	Won
1990	U2	International Group	Won
1992	U2	International Group	Nominated
1993	U2	International Group	Nominated
1993	U2	Most Successful Live Act	Won
1994	U2	International Group	Nominated
1998	U2	International Group	Won
2001	U2	International Group	Won
2001	U2	Outstanding Contribution to Music	Honoured
2005	"Take Me to the Clouds Above" (with LMC)	British Single of the Year	Nominated
2005	How to Dismantle an Atomic Bomb	International Album	Nominated
2005	U2	International Group	Nominated
2006	How to Dismantle an Atomic Bomb	International Album	Nominated
2006	U2	International Group	Nominated
2016	U2	International Group	Nominated

== Craig Awards ==
Year	Nominee / work	Award	Result
2010	U2 360° Tour	Best Tour	Won

== Critics' Choice Movie Awards ==
The Critics' Choice Movie Awards is an awards show presented annually by the Broadcast Film Critics Association to honor the finest in cinematic achievement.

Year	Nominee / work	Award	Result
2004	"Time Enough for Tears"	Best Song	Nominated
2014	"Ordinary Love"	Best Song	Nominated

== GAFFA Awards ==
=== GAFFA Awards (Denmark) ===
Delivered since 1991, the GAFFA Awards are a Danish award that rewards popular music by the magazine of the same name.

Year	Nominee / work	Award	Result	Ref.
1991	Achtung Baby	Album of the Year	Nominated	
1991	"The Fly"	Song of the Year	Nominated	
1991	U2	Band	Nominated	
1992	U2	Band	Nominated	
1992	"One"	Song of the Year	Nominated	
1992	"One"	Music Video of the Year	Nominated	
1993	U2	Concert of the Year	Won	
1993	Zooropa	Album of the Year	Nominated	
1993	U2	Most Underrated	Nominated	
1993	U2	Band	Nominated	
1997	Bono (U2)	Best Foreign Male Act	Nominated	
1997	U2	Concert of the Year	Nominated	
1997	U2	Band	Nominated	
1998	U2	Band	Nominated	
2000	U2	Band	Nominated	
2000	All That You Can't Leave Behind	Album of the Year	Nominated	
2000	Bono (U2)	Best Foreign Male Act	Won	
2000	"Beautiful Day"	Best Foreign Song	Won	
2001	U2	Foreign Live Act	Won	
2004	U2	Best Foreign Band	Won	
2004	How To Dismantle An Atomic Bomb	Best Foreign Album	Won	
2004	"Vertigo"	Best Foreign Song	Nominated	
2005	Vertigo 2005: Live from Chicago	Best Foreign DVD	Won	
2006	Zoo TV: Live From Sydney	Best Foreign DVD	Nominated	
2018	U2	Best Foreign Band	Nominated	

=== GAFFA Awards (Sweden) ===
Delivered since 2010, the GAFFA Awards (Swedish: GAFFA Priset) are a Swedish award that rewards popular music awarded by the magazine of the same name.

Year	Nominee / work	Award	Result	Ref.
2018	U2	Best Foreign Band	Nominated	

== Golden Globe Awards ==
The Golden Globe Awards are awarded annually by the Hollywood Foreign Press Association. U2 was nominated five times for Best Original Song: Their song "Stay (Faraway, So Close!)" from the Wim Wenders film Faraway, So Close! was nominated in 1994, but lost against Bruce Springsteen's "Streets of Philadelphia". For "Hold Me, Thrill Me, Kiss Me, Kill Me" from Batman Forever, they were nominated again in 1996, but lost to "Colors of the Wind" by Vanessa L. Williams. In 2003, they received the award for "The Hands That Built America", which appeared in the film Gangs of New York. In 2010 their song "Winter" for the film Brothers was also nominated but lost to "The Weary Kind" by Ryan Bingham for the film Crazy Heart. The Edge of U2 described how the band plans to celebrate the nomination. "I think we might have a pint of Guinness in honor of (director) Jim (Sheridan) and his great piece of work. In 2014, "Ordinary Love" won the Golden Globe Award for Best Original Song.

Year	Award	Work	Film	Result
1994	Best Original Song	"Stay (Faraway, So Close!)"	Faraway, So Close!	Nominated
1996	Best Original Song	"Hold Me, Thrill Me, Kiss Me, Kill Me"	Batman Forever	Nominated
2003	Best Original Song	"The Hands That Built America"	Gangs of New York	Won
2010	Best Original Song	"Winter"	Brothers	Nominated
2014	Best Original Song	"Ordinary Love"	Mandela: Long Walk to Freedom	Won

== Golden Raspberry Awards ==
The Golden Raspberry Awards are parody awards honoring the worst achievements in cinema. U2 was nominated for one Golden Raspberry Award.

Year	Award	Work	Film	Result
1996	Worst Original Song	"Hold Me, Thrill Me, Kiss Me, Kill Me"	Batman Forever	Nominated

== Grammy Awards ==
They have won 22 awards from 47 nominations. The Grammy Award are awarded annually by the Recording Academy in the United States. They have won Best Rock Performance by a Duo or Group seven times, while winning Album of the Year, Record of the Year, Song of the Year, and Best Rock Album all twice.

Year	Work	Award	Result
1988	"I Still Haven't Found What I'm Looking For"	Record of the Year	Nominated
1988	"I Still Haven't Found What I'm Looking For"	Song of the Year	Nominated
1988	The Joshua Tree	Album of the Year	Won
1988	The Joshua Tree	Best Rock Performance by a Duo or Group with Vocal	Won
1989	"Desire"	Best Rock Performance by a Duo or Group with Vocal	Won
1989	"Where the Streets Have No Name"	Best Performance Music Video	Won
1990	Rattle and Hum	Best Rock Performance by a Duo or Group with Vocal	Nominated
1990	"When Love Comes to Town" (with B. B. King)	Best Rock Performance by a Duo or Group with Vocal	Nominated
1990	"Angel of Harlem" (from Rattle and Hum)	Best Song Written Specifically for a Motion Picture or Television	Nominated
1993	Achtung Baby	Album of the Year	Nominated
1993	Achtung Baby	Best Rock Performance by a Duo or Group with Vocal	Won
1994	Zooropa	Best Alternative Music Performance	Won
1995	Zoo TV: Live from Sydney	Best Music Video, Long Form	Won
1996	"Hold Me, Thrill Me, Kiss Me, Kill Me" (from Batman Forever)	Best Rock Performance by a Duo or Group with Vocal	Nominated
1996	"Hold Me, Thrill Me, Kiss Me, Kill Me" (from Batman Forever)	Best Rock Song	Nominated
1998	Pop	Best Rock Album	Nominated
2000	PopMart: Live from Mexico City	Best Long Form Music Video	Nominated
2001	"Beautiful Day"	Record of the Year	Won
2001	"Beautiful Day"	Song of the Year	Won
2001	"Beautiful Day"	Best Rock Performance by a Duo or Group with Vocal	Won
2002	"Elevation"	Best Rock Performance by a Duo or Group with Vocal	Won
2002	"Elevation"	Best Rock Song	Nominated
2002	All That You Can't Leave Behind	Album of the Year	Nominated
2002	All That You Can't Leave Behind	Best Rock Album	Won
2002	"Stuck in a Moment You Can't Get Out Of"	Song of The Year	Nominated
2002	"Stuck in a Moment You Can't Get Out Of"	Best Pop Performance by a Duo or Group with Vocals	Won
2002	"Walk On"	Record of the Year	Won
2002	"Walk On"	Best Rock Song	Nominated
2003	"Walk On"	Best Rock Performance by a Duo or Group with Vocal	Nominated
2004	"The Hands That Built America" (from Gangs of New York)	Best Song Written for a Motion Picture, Television or Other Visual Media	Nominated
2005	"Vertigo"	Best Rock Performance by a Duo or Group with Vocal	Won
2005	"Vertigo"	Best Rock Song	Won
2005	"Vertigo"	Best Short Form Music Video	Won
2006	How to Dismantle an Atomic Bomb	Album of the Year	Won
2006	How to Dismantle an Atomic Bomb	Best Rock Album	Won
2006	"Sometimes You Can't Make It on Your Own"	Song of the Year	Won
2006	"Sometimes You Can't Make It on Your Own"	Best Rock Performance by a Duo or Group with Vocal	Won
2006	"City of Blinding Lights"	Best Rock Song	Won
2007	"One" (with Mary J. Blige)	Best Pop Collaboration with Vocals	Nominated
2007	"The Saints Are Coming" (with Green Day)	Best Rock Performance by a Duo or Group with Vocal	Nominated
2008	"Window in the Skies"	Best Pop Performance by a Duo or Group with Vocals	Nominated
2008	"Instant Karma!"	Best Rock Performance by a Duo or Group with Vocal	Nominated
2010	"I'll Go Crazy If I Don't Go Crazy Tonight"	Best Rock Song	Nominated
2010	"I'll Go Crazy If I Don't Go Crazy Tonight"	Best Rock Performance by a Duo or Group with Vocal	Nominated
2010	No Line on the Horizon	Best Rock Album	Nominated
2013	From the Sky Down	Best Long Form Music Video	Nominated
2015	Songs of Innocence	Best Rock Album	Nominated

== iHeartRadio Music Awards ==
The iHeartRadio Music Awards are sponsored by iHeartMedia.

Year	Award	Work	Result
2016	U2	Innovator Award	Won
2016	Innocence + Experience Tour	Best Tour	Nominated
2018	The Joshua Tree Tour 2017	Best Tour	Won

== International Dance Music Awards ==
The International Dance Music Award was established in 1985. It is a part of the Winter Music Conference, a weeklong electronic music event held annually.

Year	Nominee / work	Award	Result
2005	"Vertigo"	Best Alternative / Rock Dance Track	Nominated

== Italian Music Awards ==
The Italian Music Awards were an accolade established in 2001 by the Federazione Industria Musicale Italiana to recognize the achievements in the Italian music business both by domestic and international artists.

Year	Nominee / work	Award	Result
2001	U2	Best International Group	Won
2001	U2	Best International Group	Won
2001	All That You Can't Leave Behind	Best International Album	Won
2001	U2	Best International Group	Nominated

== Ivor Novello Awards ==
The Ivor Novello Awards are awarded for songwriting and composing. The awards, named after the Cardiff born entertainer Ivor Novello, are presented annually in London by the British Academy of Songwriters, Composers and Authors (BASCA). U2 have won four awards from six nominations.

Year	Nominee / work	Award	Result	Ref
1994	U2	Special Award for International Achievement	Won	
2001	"Beautiful Day"	Best Contemporary Song	Nominated	
2002	"Walk On"	Best Song Musically and Lyrically	Won	
2003	"Electrical Storm"	International Hit of the Year	Nominated	
2003	U2	Outstanding Song Collection	Won	
2005	"Vertigo"	International Hit of the Year	Won	

== Juno Award ==
The Juno Award are presented annually to Canadians musical artists and bands to acknowledge their artistic and technical achievements in all aspects of music. In 1989 and 1993, U2 won International Entertainer of the Year, and subsequently, producer Daniel Lanois won the Jack Richardson Best Producer Award for the production of "Beautiful Day" and "Elevation".

Year	Nominee / work	Award	Result
1987	The Joshua Tree	International Album of the Year	Nominated
1989	U2	International Entertainer of the Year	Won
1993	U2	International Entertainer of the Year	Won
1993	Achtung Baby	Best Selling Album (Foreign or Domestic)	Nominated
2002	All That You Can't Leave Behind	Best Selling Album (Foreign or Domestic)	Nominated
2005	How to Dismantle an Atomic Bomb	International Album of the Year	Nominated

== Kennedy Center Honors ==
In December 2022, U2 received Kennedy Center Honors for their contributions to performing arts. They were just the fifth group out of 244 musicians recognised by the Kennedy Center.

== Las Vegas Film Critics Society ==
Year	Nominee / work	Award	Result
2003	"The Hands That Built America"	Best Original Song	Won

== LOS40 Music Awards ==
The LOS40 Music Awards is an award show by the musical radio station Los 40.

Year	Nominee / work	Award	Result
2009	U2 360° Tour	Best Tour	Won
2016	Innocence + Experience Tour	Tour of the Year	Nominated
2017	The Joshua Tree Tour 2017	Tour of the Year	Won
2017	U2	Golden Music Award	Won

== MTV Video Music Award ==
The MTV Video Music Award is an award presented by the cable channel MTV to honor the best in the music video medium.

Year	Nominee / work	Award	Result	R
1985	"Pride (In the Name of Love)"	Best Group Video	Nominated	
1987	"With or Without You"	Viewer's Choice	Won	
1987	"With or Without You"	Video of the Year	Nominated	
1987	"With or Without You"	Best Group Video	Nominated	
1987	"With or Without You"	Best Overall Performance in a Video	Nominated	
1987	"With or Without You"	Best Direction in a Video	Nominated	
1987	"With or Without You"	Best Editing in a Video	Nominated	
1987	"With or Without You"	Best Cinematography in a Video	Nominated	
1988	"I Still Haven't Found What I'm Looking For"	Video of the Year	Nominated	
1988	"I Still Haven't Found What I'm Looking For"	Best Group Video	Nominated	
1988	"I Still Haven't Found What I'm Looking For"	Best Concept Video	Nominated	
1988	"I Still Haven't Found What I'm Looking For"	Viewer's Choice	Nominated	
1988	"Where the Streets Have No Name"	Video of the Year	Nominated	
1988	"Where the Streets Have No Name"	Best Group Video	Nominated	
1988	"Where the Streets Have No Name"	Best Stage Performance in a Video	Nominated	
1988	"Where the Streets Have No Name"	Viewer's Choice	Nominated	
1989	"When Love Comes to Town"	Best Video from a Film	Won	
1992	"Even Better Than the Real Thing"	Best Group Video	Won	
1992	"Even Better Than the Real Thing"	Best Special Effects in a Video	Won	
1992	"Even Better Than the Real Thing"	Best Editing in a Video	Nominated	
1994	"Stay (Faraway, So Close!)"	International Viewer's Choice for MTV Europe	Nominated	
1995	"Hold Me, Thrill Me, Kiss Me, Kill Me"	International Viewer's Choice for MTV Europe	Won	
1995	"Hold Me, Thrill Me, Kiss Me, Kill Me"	Best Video from a Film	Nominated	
2001	U2	Michael Jackson Video Vanguard Award	Won	
2001	"Beautiful Day"	Video of the Year	Nominated	
2001	"Elevation (Tomb Raider Mix)"	Best Group Video	Nominated	
2001	"Elevation (Tomb Raider Mix)"	Best Video from a Film	Nominated	
2001	"Elevation (Tomb Raider Mix)"	Best Special Effects in a Video	Nominated	
2001	"Elevation (Tomb Raider Mix)"	Best Editing in a Video	Nominated	
2005	"Vertigo"	Best Group Video	Nominated	
2005	"Vertigo"	Breakthrough Video	Nominated	
2005	"Vertigo"	Best Direction in a Video	Nominated	
2005	"Vertigo"	Best Special Effects in a Video	Nominated	
2005	"Vertigo"	Best Cinematography in a Video	Nominated	
2006	"Original of the Species"	Best Special Effects in a Video	Nominated	
2006	"Original of the Species"	Best Editing in a Video	Nominated	
2007	Bono	Quadruple Threat of the Year	Nominated	
2007	"The Saints Are Coming"	Best Collaboration	Nominated	
2009	"Where the Streets Have No Name"	Best Video (That Should Have Won a Moonman)	Nominated	
2024	"Atomic City"	Best Rock Video	Nominated	

== MTV Europe Music Award ==
The MTV Europe Music Award is an award presented by Viacom International Media Networks Europe to honour artists and music in pop culture.

Year	Nominee / work	Award	Result
1994	"Stay (Faraway, So Close!)"	Best Video	Nominated
1995	U2	Best Group	Won
1997	U2	Best Group	Nominated
1997	U2	Best Live Act	Won
1999	Bono	Free Your Mind	Won
2001	All That You Can't Leave Behind	Best Album	Nominated
2001	U2	Best Group	Nominated
2001	U2	Best Rock	Nominated
2001	U2	Web Award	Nominated
2002	U2	Best Group	Nominated
2002	U2	Best Rock	Nominated
2002	U2	Best Live Act	Won
2002	U2	Web Award	Nominated
2005	How to Dismantle an Atomic Bomb	Best Album	Nominated
2005	U2	Best Group	Nominated
2005	U2	Best Rock	Nominated
2008	U2	Best Act Ever	Nominated
2009	U2	Best Rock	Nominated
2009	U2	Best Live Act	Won
2017	U2	Best Rock	Nominated
2017	U2	Best Live Act	Won
2017	U2	Global Icon	Won
2018	U2	Best Rock	Nominated

== MTV Immies ==
Year	Nominee / work	Award	Result
2005	U2	Best International Male Pop Act	Won

== MTVU Woodie Awards ==
The MTVU Woodie Awards is an annual music show presented by MTVU with awards voted on by fans.

Year	Nominee / work	Award	Result
2005	U2	Good Woodie	Won

== Mercury Prize ==
The Mercury Prize is an annual music prize awarded for the best album from the United Kingdom or Ireland.

Year	Nominee / work	Award	Result
1992	Achtung Baby	Album of the Year	Nominated

== Meteor Music Awards ==
The Meteor Ireland Music Awards was an accolade bestowed upon professionals in the music industry in Ireland and further afield.

Year	Nominee / work	Award	Result
2001	U2	Best Irish Band	Won
2001	All That You Can't Leave Behind	Best Irish Album	Won
2001	Bono and The Edge	Best Irish Songwriter	Won
2002	U2	Best Irish Band	Won
2002	U2	Best Live Performance	Won
2002	All That You Can't Leave Behind	Best Irish Rock Album	Won
2002	"Walk On"	Best Irish Rock Single	Won
2002	"Elevation"	Best Irish Video	Won
2002	Bono	Best Irish Songwriter	Won
2002	The Edge	Best Irish Musician	Won
2003	U2	Best Irish Group	Won
2003	Bono	Humanitarian Award	Won
2006	How to Dismantle an Atomic Bomb	Best Irish Album	Won
2006	U2	Best Irish Band	Won
2006	U2	Best Live Performance	Won
2010	No Line on the Horizon	Best Irish Album	Won
2010	U2	Best Irish Band	Won
2010	U2	Best Live Performance	Won

== Music Video Production Awards ==
The MVPA Awards are annually presented by a Los Angeles-based music trade organization to honor the year's best music videos.

Year	Nominee / work	Award	Result
2002	"Elevation"	Soundtrack Video of the Year	Won
2005	"Vertigo"	Best Special Effects	Nominated
2008	"The Saints are Coming" (ft. Green Day)	Best Rock Video	Won
2008	"The Saints are Coming" (ft. Green Day)	Best Editing	Nominated
2008	"The Saints are Coming" (ft. Green Day)	Best Special Effects	Nominated

== NME Awards ==
The NME Awards were created by the NME magazine and was first held in 1953. In 2001, they received both the NME Award for "Godlike Genius" and "Best Rock Act". The following year, they received the award for "Best Live Act".

Year	Nominee / work	Award	Result
1983	The Edge	Best Guitarist	Won
1984	Bono	Best Male Singer	Won
2001	U2	Best Rock Act	Won
2001	U2	Godlike Genius	Won
2002	"Elevation"	Best Video	Won
2002	U2	Best Live Act	Won
2005	U2	Best International Band	Won
2005	Bono	Hero of the Year	Won
2005	"Vertigo"	Best Track	Won
2010	No Line on the Horizon	Best Album	Won

== NRJ Music Award ==
The NRJ Music Award is an award presented by the French radio station NRJ to honor the best in the French and worldwide music industry.

Year	Nominee / work	Award	Result
2004	Themselves	NRJ Award of Honor	Won

== People's Choice Awards ==
The People's Choice Awards is an American awards show. The following year they won Favorite Group at the People's Choice Awards.

Year	Nominee / work	Award	Result
2002	Themselves	Favorite Musical Group or Band	Won
2005	Themselves	Favorite Musical Group or Band	Won
2006	Themselves	Favorite Tour Artist	Won
2010	Themselves	Favorite Rock Band	Won

== Pollstar Concert Industry Awards ==
Year	Nominee / work	Award	Result
1987	The Joshua Tree Tour	Major Tour of the Year	Won
1992	Zoo TV Tour	Most Creative Stage Production	Won
2001	Elevation Tour	Major Tour of the Year	Won
2001	Elevation Tour	Most Creative Stage Production	Won
2001	Paul McGuinness	Personal Manager of the Year	Won
2001	Jake Berry	Road Warrior of the Year	Won
2005	Vertigo Tour	Major Tour of the Year	Won
2005	Vertigo Tour	Most Creative Stage Production	Won
2005	Jake Berry	Road Warrior of the Year	Won
2009	U2 360° Tour	Major Tour of the Year	Won
2009	U2 360° Tour	Most Creative Stage Production	Won
2009	Jake Berry	Road Warrior of the Year	Won
2016	Innocence + Experience Tour	Most Creative Stage Production	Won
2017	The Joshua Tree Tour 2017	Major Tour of the Year	Nominated
2017	The Joshua Tree Tour 2017	Most Creative Stage Production	Nominated
2017	The Joshua Tree Tour 2017	Rock Tour of the Year	Nominated
2018	Experience + Innocence Tour	Major Tour of the Year	Nominated
2018	Experience + Innocence Tour	Best Rock Tour	Nominated
2018	Jake Berry	Road Warrior of the Year	Nominated
2024	U2:UV Achtung Baby Live at Sphere	Residency of the Year	Won
2025	U2:UV Achtung Baby Live at Sphere	Residency of the Year	Nominated

== Q Awards ==
The Q Awards are the United Kingdom annual music awards run by the music magazine Q.

Year	Nominee / work	Award	Result
1990	U2	Best Act in the World Today	Won
1991	U2	Best Act in the World Today	Won
1992	U2	Best Act in the World Today	Won
1993	U2	Best Act in the World Today	Won
1994	U2	Award of Merit	Won
1996	U2	Inspiration Award	Won
2001	U2	People's Choice Award	Won
2004	U2	Icon Award	Won
2005	U2	Best Live Act	Won
2006	U2	Award of Award	Won
2006	The Edge	Innovation In Sound Award	Won
2009	The Unforgettable Fire	Classic Album	Won
2011	U2	Greatest Act of the Last 25 Years	Won
2016	U2	Best Live Act	Won
2016	The Edge	Gibson Les Paul Award	Won

== Rock and Roll Hall of Fame ==
Year	Nominee / work	Award	Result
2005	U2	Inductee	Honored

== Sports Emmy Awards ==
The Sports Emmy Awards are presented by the National Academy of Television Arts and Sciences (NATAS) in recognition of excellence in American sports television programming, including sports-related series, live coverage of sporting events, and best sports announcers.

Year	Nominee / work	Award	Result
2011	2010 FIFA World Cup – U2 & Soweto Gospel Choir	Outstanding Music Composition/Direction/Lyrics	Won

== TVZ Awards ==
The TVZ Awards was established in 1994 to honor the best in Brazilian music. In 1998, the award changed its name to Multishow Brazilian Music Awards.

Year	Nominee / work	Award	Result	Ref.
1997	U2	Best International Group	Won	

== UK Music Video Awards ==
The UK Music Video Awards is an annual award ceremony founded in 2008 to recognise creativity, technical excellence and innovation in music videos and moving images for music.

Year	Nominee / work	Award	Result
2015	"Every Breaking Wave"	Best Rock/Indie Video - International	Nominated
2015	"Every Breaking Wave"	Best Art Direction	Nominated
2015	"Every Breaking Wave"	Best Cinematography	Nominated
2015	"Every Breaking Wave"	Best Editing	Nominated

== World Soundtrack Academy ==
The World Soundtrack Academy launched in 2001 by the Flanders International Film Festival Ghent

Year	Nominee / work	Award	Result
2003	"The Hands That Built America"	Best Original Song Written Directly for a Film	Won
2014	"Ordinary Love"	Best Original Song Written Directly for a Film	Nominated
