= Brothers (2009 soundtrack) =

Brothers (Original Motion Picture Soundtrack)

Film score by Thomas Newman
- Released: November 30, 2009
- Recorded: 2009
- Studio: Eastwood Scoring Stage, Warner Bros. Studios, Burbank; The Village, Los Angeles
- Genre: Film score
- Length: 24:56
- Label: Relativity Music Group
- Producer: Thomas Newman; Bill Bernstein

Thomas Newman chronology
Revolutionary Road (2008)	Brothers (2009)	The Adjustment Bureau (2011)

Brothers (Original Motion Picture Soundtrack) is the soundtrack album for the film Brothers directed by Jim Sheridan, starring Tobey Maguire, Jake Gyllenhaal and Natalie Portman. The film score is composed by Thomas Newman and released through Relativity Music Group on November 30, 2009. The song "Winter", performed by U2, was nominated for the Golden Globe Award for Best Original Song at the 67th Golden Globe Awards.

== Background ==
The original score for Brothers is composed by Thomas Newman and was recorded at the Eastwood Scoring Stage in Warner Bros. Studios Burbank and the Village studio in Los Angeles. The film featured an original song "Winter" performed by the Irish rock band U2. Though written specifically for the film, the song was released way before the film, on February 27, 2009, with the release of their studio album No Line on the Horizon and also appeared in the album's accompanying film Linear. The score album was released on November 30, 2009, through Relativity Music Group.

== Reception ==
Jonathan Broxton of Movie Music UK noted that like his recent works, the score for this film "goes down the ambient, modernistic path rather than the symphonic stylings that his fans enjoy so much". He compared it to the likes of In the Bedroom (2001), Little Children (2006), Towelhead (2007) and Revolutionary Road (2008) which are "appropriate for the film, but ineffective away from it". Richard Propes of The Independent Critic wrote "Thomas Newman's original score plays a bit saccharine and melodramatic given the film's very real goings on". A. O. Scott of The New York Times called the score "melodramatic". Daniel Carlson of Pajiba called it a "vaguely electric score".

== Track listing ==
All music is composed by Thomas Newman.

No.	Title	Length
1.	"Homecoming"	1:50
2.	"Bad News"	1:01
3.	"Uncle Tommy"	2:40
4.	"Afghanistan"	1:23
5.	"In The Hole"	0:41
6.	"Sold"	1:27
7.	"Ice Skating"	1:02
8.	"Not Another Word"	0:53
9.	"Brothers"	1:59
10.	"No Value"	1:49
11.	"The Pipe"	2:42
12.	"Snowman"	0:48
13.	"Night Graves"	1:05
14.	"War Hero"	0:49
15.	"What Happened?"	4:43
Total length:		24:56

== Accolades ==
Award	Category	Recipient(s) and nominee(s)	Result	Ref.
Denver Film Critics Society	Best Original Song	"Winter" – U2	Nominated	
Golden Globe Awards	Best Original Song	"Winter" – U2	Nominated	
International Film Music Critics Association	Best Original Score for a Horror/Thriller Film	Thomas Newman	Nominated	

== Personnel ==
Credits adapted from liner notes:

- Music composer – Thomas Newman
- Music producer – Bill Bernstein, Thomas Newman
- Recording and mixing – Tommy Vicari
- Mastering – Bernie Grundman
- Music editor – Bill Bernstein
- Assistant music editor – Mike Zainer
- Assistant engineer – Shin Miyazawa
- Music contractor – Leslie Morris
- Music supervisor – Gina Amador

Instruments

- Cello – Steve Erdody
- Dark flute, Afghan hound noises, cymbal loops and ambient skitters – Rick Cox
- Drum programming – Steve Tavaglione, John Beasley
- Electric guitar (stratocaster), baritone guitar, mandolin, lute, saz, esraj, hammered dulcimer – George Doering
- Electric violin (strummed) and ghost piano – Thomas Newman
- Fingered hurdy gurdy, electronic wind instrument, electric wire, duduk – Steve Tavaglione
- Hammond organ and electric piano (Wurlitzer) – John Beasley
- Siegh bells, tambourine, frame drum, daf rings, rig drum, duff drum, bangradol, ski poles and tabla – Michael Fisher
- Viola – Victoria Miskolczy
- Violin – Joel Derouin, Sid Page
