= Revolutionary Road (soundtrack) =

Soundtrack album by Thomas Newman
- Released: December 23, 2008
- Studio: The Village, Los Angeles
- Genre: Film score
- Length: 45:42
- Label: Nonesuch
- Producer: Thomas Newman; Bill Bernstein

Thomas Newman chronology
| WALL-E (2008) | Revolutionary Road (2008) | Brothers (2009) |

Revolutionary Road is the soundtrack album to the 2008 film of the same name directed by Sam Mendes and starring Leonardo DiCaprio and Kate Winslet. The album featured 12 tracks from the film score composed by Thomas Newman and three popular covers of 20th century songs. The album was released through Nonesuch Records on December 23, 2008.

== Background and development ==
The score for Revolutionary Road is composed by Thomas Newman, a recurrent collaborator of Mendes' since American Beauty (1999). Newman received the offer to score the film while he was working on WALL-E which he began since 2005 and wanted to finish that film so that Newman would work with Revolutionary Road. He considered the music to be psychological and not periodic even though it takes place in the 1950s, and much similar to The Shawshank Redemption (1994) where it had utilized a symphonic orchestra played it in a different manner so that it dwells in a psychological aspect more than the classical aspect. Newman added that they went ahead with a proscenium approach to the orchestra to provide a timeless quality.

Besides the orchestra, the piano served as another instrument of melody. Newman provided a darker approach to the piano, as he brainstormed while finding the score and went through numerous iterations that came in default and less through conceptual design. Newman further appreciated Sam's creative personality which provided a symbiotic approach in multiple ways, and this provided them for an identifiiable theme that would make the audiences aware. As the film was nearly dialogue-driven, Newman used less music to make it more effective.

Because of the psychological and intimate aspect of the story, Newman initially began working with a small group of players to provide the aspect and then work with an orchestra for overdubs. Eventually he began recording the score for the film during September 2008 and worked on the orchestra during the third week of September while the mixing was done during early-October.

== Reception ==
Jonathan Broxton of Movie Music UK said "despite Revolutionary Road containing a great deal of generally quite nice music [...] it seems a rather insubstantial score [from Thomas Newman]; agreeable and diverting, but ultimately rather forgettable." James Southall of Movie Wave praised Newman's ability to "create such a hypnotic atmosphere with this ensemble" and felt "it's a joy to hear" despite the familiarity. He called it as one of the most accomplished scores of 2008. Michael Quinn of BBC reviewed it as "another characteristically subtle essay in dislocating musical ambiguity."

Dan Mecca of The Film Stage considered it to be "simple and effective". Todd McCarthy of Variety wrote "Thomas Newman's score, defined as it is by very simple three-note progressions, plays into the desired mood but grows repetitive." Steve Babish of Tiny Mix Tapes wrote "A pensive, minimalist score by frequent Mendes collaborator Thomas Newman consistently underlines the script's emotional peaks and valleys". Jonathan Romney of The Independent called it a "leadenly compassionate score". Manohla Dargis of The New York Times noted that Newman's score has the "pounding monotony". Dave Calhoun of Time Out wrote "Thomas Newman's forceful, repetitive score doesn't help either; its refrain becomes more annoying the more you hear it." Moira Macdonald of The Seattle Times stated that Newman's score "seems to [echo the characters'] heartbeats".

== Track listing ==
| No. | Title | Artist(s) | Length |
|---|---|---|---|
| 1. | "Route 12" | | 2:23 |
| 2. | "Picture Window" | | 1:17 |
| 3. | "The Bright Young Man" | | 3:31 |
| 4. | "Hopeless Emptiness" | | 1:26 |
| 5. | "Unrealistic" | | 2:49 |
| 6. | "Count Every Star" | The Ravens | 2:53 |
| 7. | "Simple Clean Lines" | | 1:31 |
| 8. | "Speaking of Production Control" | | 1:06 |
| 9. | "Golden People" | | 2:08 |
| 10. | "Night Woods" | | 4:53 |
| 11. | "Crying in the Chapel" | The Orioles | 3:02 |
| 12. | "April" | | 9:34 |
| 13. | "A Bit Whimsical" | | 1:31 |
| 14. | "Revolutionary Road" (End Title) | | 4:53 |
| 15. | "The Gypsy" | The Ink Spots | 2:45 |
| Total length: | | | 45:42 |

== Personnel ==
Credits adapted from Nonesuch Records:

- Music composer – Thomas Newman
- Producer – Bill Bernstein, Thomas Newman
- Digital audio engineer – Larry Mah
- Assistant engineer – Shin Miyazawa, Tim Lauber
- Recording – Armin Steiner, Tommy Vicari
- Mixing – Tommy Vicari
- Mastering – Bernie Grundman
- Score editor – Bill Bernstein
- Assistant score editor – Michael Zainer
- Audio coordinator – George Doering
- Digital coordinator – Ernest Lee
- Design – togetherwecreate
- Music supervisor – Randall Poster
- Executive producer – Bobby Cohen, John N. Hart, Sam Mendes, Scott Rudin, Robert Hurwitz
- Music management – Jennifer Hawks, Randy Spendlove
- Music consultant – Julian Bratolyubov
- Music clearance – Julie Butchko

Orchestra

- Conductor – Thomas Newman
- Orchestrator – J.A.C. Redford
- Contractor – Leslie Morris
- Concertmaster – Sid Page

Orchestra musicians

- Bass – Ann Atkinson, Bruce Morgenthaler, Don Ferrone, Frances Liu Wu, Nico Abondolo (principal), Nicolas Philippon, Norman Ludwin, Peter Doubrovsky, Sue Ranney
- Cello – Andrew Duckles, Armen Ksajikian, Christina Soule, Chris Ermacoff, Dane Little, Daniel Smith, Dennis Karmazyn, Erika Duke Kirkpatrick, Larry Corbett, Melissa Hasin, Steve Erdody (principal), Suzie Katayama, Vahe Hayrikyan
- Viola – Aaron Oltman, Carolyn Riley, David Walther (principal), Denyse Buffum, Dmitri Bovaird, Janet Lakatos, Karie Prescott, Marda Todd, Matthew Funes, Miriam Granat, Piotr Jandula, Rene Novog, Roland Kato
- Violin – Alan Grunfeld, Anatoly Rosinsky, Armen Garabedian, Barbra Porter, Daniel Shindaryov, Darius Campo (principal 2nd), Debra Price, Eun-Mee Ahn, Guillermo Romero, Haim Shtrum, Hakop Mekinyan, Harris Goldman, Jay Rosen, Jennifer Munday, John Wittenberg, Josefina Vergara, Kevin Connolly, Kirsten Fife, Laurence Greenfield, Lisa Dondlinger, Marc Sazer, Mario DeLeon, Mark Robertson, Mike Markman, Michele Richards, Natalie Leggett, Nicole Bush, Norman Hughes, Peter Kent, Richard Altenbach, Robert Matsuda, Sharon Harmon, Sharon Jackson, Sid Page (concertmaster), Songa Lee-Kitto

Soloist musicians

- Hammered dulcimer, struck mandolin, e-bow, pedaled electric steel guitar – George Doering
- Flute, alto flute, electronic wind instrument, whistle and ambient freezes – Steve Tavaglione
- Wired piano (dark matter, E minor drift and transparent D) – Rick Cox
- Piano and simplified violin – Thomas Newman
- Struck and bowed metal strings, backward vibraphone and bass drum – Michael Fisher

== Awards and nominations ==
| Awards | Category | Recipients | Result | Ref. |
|---|---|---|---|---|
| Classic Brit Awards | Soundtrack of the Year | Thomas Newman | Won | |
| Houston Film Critics Society Awards | Best Original Score | Thomas Newman | Nominated | |
