= Grammy Award for Best Performance Music Video =

Award presented in 1988 and 1989

- Awarded for: Quality performance music videos
- Country: United States
- Presented by: National Academy of Recording Arts and Sciences
- First award: 1988
- Final award: 1989
- Website: grammy.com

The Grammy Award for Best Performance Music Video was an honor presented to recording artists at the 30th Grammy Awards in 1988 and the 31st Grammy Awards in 1989 for quality performance music videos. The Grammy Awards, an annual ceremony that was established in 1958 and originally called the Gramophone Awards, are presented by the National Academy of Recording Arts and Sciences of the United States to "honor artistic achievement, technical proficiency and overall excellence in the recording industry, without regard to album sales or chart position".

Beginning in 1982, the Academy began to honor quality music videos with the Video of the Year category. This category was discontinued with the establishment of the MTV Video Music Awards in 1984 and was replaced by awards for Best Video, Short Form and Best Video Album. Criteria changes for the 1988 and 1989 ceremonies resulted in the Best Performance Music Video award being presented alongside the award for Best Concept Music Video. Best Performance Music Video award recipients were Anthony Eaton as the video producer of The Prince's Trust All-Star Rock Concert, a recording of a benefit concert for The Prince's Trust, and the Irish rock band U2 for "Where the Streets Have No Name". The Academy returned to the previous format in 1990, though the categories are now known as Best Short Form Music Video and Best Long Form Music Video.

== Background ==
The National Academy of Recording Arts and Sciences began to honor quality music videos with the Video of the Year category in 1982. The first two award recipients were former member of The Monkees, Michael Nesmith for the hour-long video Elephant Parts (also known as Michael Nesmith in Elephant Parts) as well as Olivia Newton-John for Olivia Physical. The Video of the Year category was discontinued with the establishment of the MTV Video Music Awards in 1984, the top award of which is also presented for Video of the Year. The Academy replaced the category with the awards for Best Video, Short Form and Best Video Album beginning with the 26th Grammy Awards. For the awards held in 1988 and 1989, the criteria changed and honors were presented for the categories Best Concept Music Video and Best Performance Music Video. The Academy returned to the previous format in 1990, though the categories were renamed Best Music Video, Short Form and Best Music Video, Long Form. In 1998, the categories were retitled Best Short Form Music Video and Best Long Form Music Video, respectively.

== Recipients ==
Year	Video	Artist(s)
1988
1988	The Prince's Trust All-Star Rock Concert	Various Artists; Anthony Eaton, producer
1988	Cyndi Lauper in Paris	Cyndi Lauper; John Diaz, producer; Andy Morahan, director
1988	Horowitz in Moscow	Vladimir Horowitz; Brian Large, director
1988	One Voice	Barbra Streisand; Dwight Hemion, director
1988	Spontaneous Inventions	Bobby McFerrin; Bud Schaetzle, director
1989
1989	Where the Streets Have No Name	U2; Meiert Avis, director; Ben Dossett, Michael Hamlyn, producers
1989	Check It Out	John Mellencamp
1989	Glass Spider	David Bowie
1989	Stevie Nicks: Live at Red Rocks	Stevie Nicks; Marty Callner, director
1989	The Symphonic Sessions	Vancouver Symphony Orchestra; David Foster, producer

For the 30th Grammy Awards (1988), Best Performance Music Video nominees included Anthony Eaton for producing The Prince's Trust All-Star Rock Concert (a recording of a benefit concert for The Prince's Trust), Russian American pianist Vladimir Horowitz for Horowitz in Moscow, Cyndi Lauper for Cyndi Lauper in Paris, Bobby McFerrin for Spontaneous Inventions, and Barbra Streisand for One Voice. Directed by Brian Large, Horowitz in Moscow was a recording of Horowitz's first concert appearance in Russia since 1925 and features compositions by Chopin, Mozart, Rachmaninoff, Schubert and other composers. Cyndi Lauper in Paris was filmed at Zénith de Paris on March 12, 1987, the final date of her world tour. Produced by John Diaz and directed by Andy Morahan, the recording features Sterling Campbell on drums, Rick Derringer on guitar, Sue Hadjopoulas on percussion, Kevin Jenkins on bass, and David Rosenthal on keyboards. Ferrin's Spontaneous Inventions, directed by Bud Schaetzle, is an hour-long recording of a 1986 performance in Hollywood. Streisand's video One Voice, directed by Dwight Hemion, is a companion piece to her 1987 live album of the same name. Originally broadcast as an HBO special, the September 6, 1986 concert recording marked her first "official" live performance since 1972, held in part as a protest against the nuclear arms race during Ronald Reagan's presidency. The concert was filmed in Streisand's backyard and features special appearances by Burt Bacharach, Barry Gibb, Richard Marx, Carole Bayer Sager and comedian Robin Williams. The award was presented to Eaton as the producer of the concert recording, which included appearances by Elton John, Sting, Tina Turner and others.

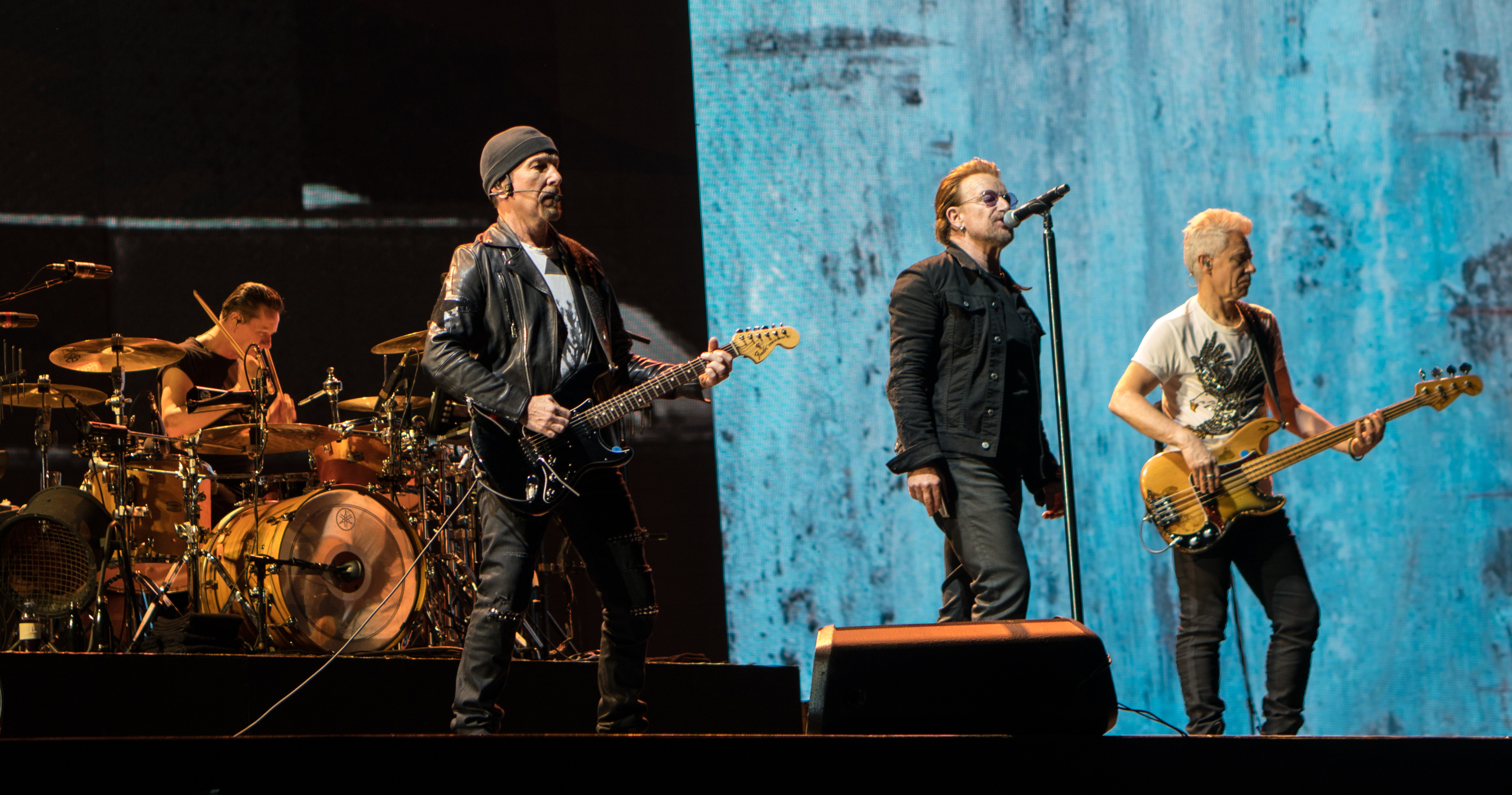
Members of the 1989 award-winning band U2, performing during "The Joshua Tree Tour 2017".

Nominees for the 31st Grammy Awards were English musician David Bowie for Glass Spider, Canadian musician and producer David Foster for The Symphony Sessions, American singer-songwriter John Cougar Mellencamp for "Check It Out", Stevie Nicks for Stevie Nicks: Live at Red Rocks, and the Irish rock band U2 for "Where the Streets Have No Name". Glass Spider was a recording of a live two-hour concert filmed in Sydney in November 1987. The Symphony Sessions included ten compositions by Foster presented as a "collage of video images" in performance with the Vancouver Symphony Orchestra. Recorded over a period of five nights in Vancouver, Foster wrote, arranged, produced and played piano for the project (which included a recording of the theme for the 1988 Winter Olympics) with the assistance of Jeremy Lubbock, David Paich, and Lee Ritenour. The music video for "Check It Out", a song that appears on Mellencamp's 1987 album The Lonesome Jubilee, was filmed live at Market Square Arena in Indianapolis, Indiana on December 11, 1987. Directed by Marty Callner, Stevie Nicks: Live at Red Rocks is an hour-long recording of a live concert filmed at Red Rocks Amphitheatre in Morrison, Colorado with special guests Mick Fleetwood and Peter Frampton. The music video for U2's "Where the Streets Have No Name" was filmed on the roof of a Los Angeles liquor store. During the filming process, police ordered the band to stop the shoot "due to fears the crowd was getting out of hand". Awards were presented to members of U2 (Bono, Adam Clayton, The Edge, Larry Mullen, Jr.) as the performing group, along with Meiert Avis as the video director and Ben Dossett and Michael Hamlyn as the video producers.

== See also ==
- Latin Grammy Award for Best Long Form Music Video
- Latin Grammy Award for Best Short Form Music Video
- List of awards received by U2
