= Brothers (2009 film) =

2009 drama film by Jim Sheridan

- Theatrical release poster
- Directed by: Jim Sheridan
- Screenplay by: David Benioff
- Based on: Brødre by Susanne Bier and Anders Thomas Jensen
- Produced by: Michael De Luca; Sigurjón Sighvatsson; Ryan Kavanaugh
- Starring: Tobey Maguire; Jake Gyllenhaal; Natalie Portman; Sam Shepard; Clifton Collins Jr.; Mare Winningham
- Cinematography: Frederick Elmes
- Edited by: Jay Cassidy
- Music by: Thomas Newman
- Production companies: Relativity Media; Michael De Luca Productions; Sighvatsson Films
- Distributed by: Lionsgate
- Release date: December 4, 2009
- Running time: 105 minutes
- Country: United States
- Languages: English; Pashto
- Budget: $26 million
- Box office: $43.5 million

Brothers is a 2009 American psychological thriller war film directed by Jim Sheridan and written by David Benioff. The film is a remake of the 2004 Danish film by Susanne Bier, and both films take inspiration from the epic poem Odyssey by Homer. The film stars Tobey Maguire, Jake Gyllenhaal, Natalie Portman, Sam Shepard, Clifton Collins Jr., and Mare Winningham. The film follows Captain Sam Cahill, a USMC officer who is captured by the Taliban after he is presumably killed in the war in Afghanistan. Upon being rescued and reunited with his brother Tommy and wife Grace, he has severe PTSD as he struggles to reintegrate into society.

Brothers was theatrically released in the United States on December 4, 2009 by Lionsgate, and received mixed reviews from critics, although Maguire's acting was praised. The film grossed $45 million against a $26 million budget. The film was nominated for Best Actor for Maguire and Best Original Song for "Winter", performed by U2, at the 67th Golden Globe Awards.

== Plot ==
Captain Sam Cahill (USMC) is about to be sent to war in Afghanistan in 2007. He is married to his high school sweetheart, Grace, with whom he has two young daughters, Isabelle and Maggie. Sam's younger brother, Tommy, is released from prison on parole after being arrested for armed robbery. At a family dinner with Hank and Elsie, the Cahills' parents, Hank insults Tommy for not understanding his brother's duty and for his criminal past.

During Sam's tour, his helicopter is shot down. He and Private Joe Willis are the sole survivors. They are taken prisoner by the Taliban, but are declared killed in action by the US government. Upon hearing the news of his brother's presumed death, Tommy berates Grace for letting Sam go to Afghanistan. At Sam's memorial service, Hank attempts to drive Elsie and the girls home while drunk, but Tommy intercepts him. Hank once again berates Tommy, and Tommy accuses Hank of influencing Sam to join the Marines because of his own Vietnam War service.

Tommy attempts to mend his relationship with Hank. He bonds with Grace, aided by his growing paternal connection with Isabelle and Maggie. Tommy renovates the kitchen for Grace. Tommy also apologizes to the bank teller who he held at gunpoint during the robbery. Grace and Tommy unwittingly kiss, but do not take their attraction any further. Meanwhile, Sam and Joe are tortured by their captors and Sam is eventually forced at gunpoint to brutally beat Joe to death with a metal pipe.

Several months later, Sam is rescued and returns home. He struggles to readjust, showing signs of severe post-traumatic stress disorder; his daughters grow fearful and resentful toward him. Sam also lies to Joe's widow about her husband's death. His paranoia causes him to believe Grace and Tommy fell in love while he went away. When Grace questions Sam about what happened in Afghanistan, Sam does not answer and demands to know what happened between her and Tommy. Grace tells Sam that she and Tommy shared only one kiss while he was gone, but Sam has trouble believing that is all that happened.

During Maggie's birthday party, Isabelle complains that she never got what she wanted for her birthday and that Sam was also absent on her birthday. Isabelle begins to play with a balloon loudly, causing Sam to become exasperated and annoyed and pop the balloon in rage in front of the family. A hurt Isabelle falsely claims that Tommy and Grace are having an affair and angrily tells Sam that she wishes he had actually died.

Returning home, Grace puts the girls to bed. Isabelle apologizes to Grace, saying that she prefers having her Uncle Tommy around over their own father. Grace assures both of the girls that Sam will get better soon. Grace then calls Elsie, concerned for their safety. Tommy prepares to go to Sam and Grace's house as Elsie urges Hank to call the police. Sam, believing his daughter's story and angry about having killed Joe in order to get back home, loses his temper and wrecks the kitchen with a crowbar. He calms down when Tommy shows up and embraces him, but then becomes defensive and holds Tommy at gunpoint. DOD Police arrive and confront Sam, leading to a standoff. Sam fires a pistol into the air and demands that the policemen kill him. Tommy quiets the officers and attempts to talk to Sam, but Sam puts the gun to his own head before tearfully telling Tommy that he's "drowning". Sam then surrenders.

Sam is arrested and admitted to a Veterans' Affairs hospital. After his arrest, Grace reads the letter Sam wrote her, to be delivered in the event of his passing. Eventually, Grace visits him, giving him an ultimatum that if he does not tell her the truth, he will lose both her and his family forever. Sam finally confesses that he killed Joe and they embrace. Devastated and traumatized, he wonders if he will ever be able to live a normal life again.

== Cast ==
- Tobey Maguire as Capt. Samuel "Sam" Cahill, a USMC officer who is sent to war in Afghanistan
- Jake Gyllenhaal as Thomas "Tommy" Cahill, Sam's younger brother
- Natalie Portman as Grace Cahill, Sam's wife
- Sam Shepard as Henry "Hank" Cahill, Sam & Tommy's father
- Mare Winningham as Elsie Cahill, Sam & Tommy's stepmother
- Bailee Madison as Isabelle Cahill, Sam & Grace's older daughter and Tommy's niece
- Taylor Geare as Margaret "Maggie" Cahill, Sam & Grace's younger daughter and Tommy's niece
- Patrick Flueger as Pvt. Joseph "Joe" Willis
- Clifton Collins Jr. as Maj. Cavazos
- Carey Mulligan as Cassie Willis, Joe's wife
- Omid Abtahi as Yusuf
- Ethan Suplee as Sweeney
- Navid Negahban as Murad
- Yousef Azami as Taliban Leader
- Jenny Wade as Tina
- César Évora as Gabriel
- Enayat Delawary as Ahmed
- Arron Shiver as A. J.
- Ray Prewitt as Owen

== Soundtrack ==
Brothers (Original Motion Picture Soundtrack) is the soundtrack album for the film, which contains the score composed by Thomas Newman. It was released by Relativity Music Group on November 30, 2009. The song "Winter", performed by the Irish rock band U2, was released on February 27, 2009, and was nominated for the Golden Globe Award for Best Original Song at the 67th Golden Globe Awards.

== Reception ==
=== Box office ===
Brothers grossed $28.5 million in the United States and Canada, and $14.9 million in other territories, for a worldwide total of $43.5 million. It was produced on a budget of $26 million.

In the United States, Brothers opened on December 4, 2009, alongside Everybody's Fine and Armored. It grossed $3.6 million on its first day, in 2,088 theaters, with an average of $1,711 per theater. It grossed $9.5 million in its opening weekend, with an average of $4,563 per theater, ranking in third place behind The Twilight Saga: New Moon. The film closed on January 21, 2010, with $28.5 million domestically.

=== Critical response ===
Brothers received mixed reviews from film critics. On the review aggregator website Rotten Tomatoes, 63% of 156 critics' reviews are positive, with an average rating of 6.2/10. The website's consensus reads: "It plays more like a traditional melodrama than the Susanne Bier film that inspired it, but Jim Sheridan's Brothers benefits from rock-solid performances by its three leads." Metacritic, which uses a weighted average, assigned the film a score of 58 out of 100, based on 31 critics, indicating "mixed or average" reviews. Audiences polled by CinemaScore gave the film an average grade of "B" on an A+ to F scale.

Tobey Maguire received critical acclaim for his dramatic performance; Roger Ebert gave the film three and a half stars and wrote that Brothers is "Tobey Maguire's film to dominate, and I've never seen these dark depths in him before." Claudia Puig of USA Today observed the resemblance between Maguire and Gyllenhaal, and praised their onscreen chemistry. Regarding Portman's performance, Puig opined that it was "subdued and reactive". Writing for New York magazine, David Edelstein praised the three main actors: "Sheridan's actors work with their intellects fully engaged—and they engage us on levels we barely knew we had." He also complimented the cinematography and Sheridan's ability to pull the viewer into the plot. Entertainment Weekly's Owen Gleiberman gave the film a rating of C+, writing, "Brothers isn't badly acted, but as directed by the increasingly impersonal Jim Sheridan, it’s lumbering and heavy-handed, a film that piles on overwrought dramatic twists until it begins to creak under the weight of its presumed significance."

=== Accolades ===
Year	Ceremony	Category	Recipients	Result
2009	15th Critics' Choice Awards	Best Young Actor / Actress	Bailee Madison	Nominated
2009	36th Saturn Awards	Best Action or Adventure Film	Brothers	Nominated
2009	36th Saturn Awards	Best Actor	Tobey Maguire	Nominated
2009	36th Saturn Awards	Best Actress	Natalie Portman	Nominated
2009	36th Saturn Awards	Best Performance by a Younger Actor	Bailee Madison	Nominated
2009	67th Golden Globe Awards	Best Actor in a Motion Picture – Drama	Tobey Maguire	Nominated
2009	67th Golden Globe Awards	Best Original Song	"Winter" by U2	Nominated
2009	2010 Teen Choice Awards	Choice Movie Actor – Drama	Tobey Maguire	Nominated
2009	2010 Teen Choice Awards	Choice Movie Actor – Drama	Jake Gyllenhaal	Nominated
2009	Chicago Film Critics Association Awards 2009	Best Supporting Actress	Natalie Portman	Nominated
2009	Denver Film Critics Society Awards 2009	Best Original Song	"Winter" By U2	Nominated

== Home media ==
Brothers was released on DVD and Blu-ray on March 23, 2010.

== Opera adaptation ==
Brothers – The Opera is an opera based on the original 2004 Danish version of the film by Icelandic composer Daníel Bjarnason; it was premiered at the Musikhuset Aarhus on 16 August 2017. It was commissioned by Den Jyske Opera. Kerstin Perski wrote the libretto and the director was Kasper Holten. To celebrate Aarhus as the European Capital of Culture 2017, three stage works – a musical, dance, and an opera all based on films by Susanne Bier – were commissioned and performed in Musikhuset.
