= Winter (U2 song) =

- Promotional release single cover

Song by U2
- Released: 27 February 2009
- Genre: Rock
- Length: 6:17 (Linear version); 5:02 (Brothers version)
- Label: Island
- Composer: U2
- Lyricist: Bono
- Producers: Brian Eno, Daniel Lanois

"Winter" is a song by rock band U2. The track was originally planned to be included on the band's 2009 album No Line on the Horizon, but it was cut at the end of the recording sessions as it did not fit the album's theme. The song does appear on the accompanying film Linear. "Winter" was written for the 2009 war film Brothers at the request of director Jim Sheridan, and it plays over the closing credits. Several different versions of the song have been recorded, including an uptempo rock arrangement on Linear and a slower acoustic version in Brothers. The song was nominated for the Golden Globe Award for Best Original Song.

== Writing and recording ==
"Winter" was written for the 2009 war film Brothers directed by Jim Sheridan. After telling the band about the script for the film, Sheridan asked them if they would write a song for it. Guitarist The Edge began to compose a piece on piano that the band thought would fit the film. As the recording progressed, it became a "conventional, straightforward arrangement" which The Edge described as "too close to the U2 sound and U2 form". The track did not begin to come together until U2 viewed a rough cut of the film. The Edge noted "it was really at that point that we really got inspired and the song started to come together quite quickly".

With the help of producer Brian Eno, the band began to work on the song from a different angle, with the result being a more stripped-down version that echoed The Edge's original piano composition. The Edge stated that the piano "seemed to be the key to making the song work... when we went back to that instrument, it seemed to lock in and start to make sense". The original rock arrangement is the one in Linear, while the acoustic version is what appears in Brothers. In addition, an electronic version has also been developed.

Lead singer Bono wrote the lyrics in one night and they were revised just once after that. Tobey Maguire's character Captain Sam Cahill was the inspiration for the lyric, with the band noting that the focus on "intense hidden emotion" and the secrets he held inside "was a jumping off point, thematically." Bono noted that Sheridan wanted a "complex song for a complex character" and so the band wrote two songs: "Winter" and "White as Snow". While "White as Snow" focuses more on the relationship between the Cahill brothers, "Winter" is a "more universal song about the experience of the armed forces in Afghanistan."

U2 wanted to include "Winter" on the album No Line on the Horizon, as well as on Brothers, but this ultimately did not happen; The Edge noted that "though it's a beautiful tune, it doesn't quite fit on our record thematically". The song was cut in the final days of recording. Brothers was planned to be released before No Line on the Horizon, but the timing made it difficult to complete the song in time, and the band offered Sheridan the use of "White as Snow" instead. The eventual delay in the release of Brothers gave the band enough time to complete "Winter" and it was used in the film's closing credits. The band later noted that it was a better selection for the film than "White as Snow".

== Composition ==
Q described the rockier Linear version as being "surrounded by a deceptively simple rhythm track and an evocative string arrangement courtesy of Eno."

== Appearances in other media ==
"Winter" appears as the third track in the Anton Corbijn film Linear, based on a story by Corbijn and Bono where a Parisian traffic cop travels across France and the Mediterranean Sea to visit his girlfriend in Tripoli. During the sequence, the cop, played by Saïd Taghmaoui, leaves Paris and begins his journey across the French and Spanish countryside. It ends with him pulling off the road for a rest where the next track, "White as Snow", begins.

== Reception ==
For its role in Brothers, "Winter" was nominated for the Golden Globe Award for Best Original Song at the 2010 ceremony. In a preview of No Line on the Horizon, Q called the Linear version one of the "instantly striking tracks" while describing Bono's "lyric about a soldier in an unspecified war zone" as "fine". Rolling Stone reviewer Brian Hiatt called it a "lovely discarded ballad". The Los Angeles Times had a negative impression of the Brothers version, labelling it "a snails-paced somber number with some oh-so-serious, look-at-me flashes of rhythm" while noting that it "could have used some of the gospel atmospheres of the act's 2009 effort 'No Line on the Horizon'."
