= 67th Golden Globe Awards =

Film award ceremony in 2010

- Date: January 17, 2010
- Site: The Beverly Hilton, Beverly Hills, California, U.S.
- Hosted by: Ricky Gervais

Highlights
- Best Film: Drama: Avatar
- Best Film: Musical or Comedy: The Hangover
- Best Drama Series: Mad Men
- Best Musical or Comedy Series: Glee
- Best Miniseries or Television movie: Grey Gardens
- Most awards: (2) Avatar; Crazy Heart; Up
- Most nominations: (6) Up in the Air

The 67th Golden Globe Awards was telecasted live from the Beverly Hilton Hotel in Beverly Hills, California on Sunday, January 17, 2010 by NBC, from 5:00 PM – 8:00 PM (PST) and 8:00 PM – 11:00 PM (EST) (1:00 – 4:00; Monday, January 18 UTC). The ceremonies were hosted by Ricky Gervais, and were broadcast live for the first time.

Nominations were announced on December 15, 2009. Among films, Up in the Air led with six nominations, followed by Nine with five and Avatar and Inglourious Basterds with four each. Matt Damon, Sandra Bullock, Meryl Streep, and Anna Paquin were each nominated twice; Damon as Best Actor – Comedy and Best Supporting Actor – Motion Picture; Bullock as Best Actress in both the Comedy and Drama categories; Streep competing against herself as Best Actress in the Comedy category; and Paquin as Best Actress – TV Series Drama and as Best Actress – Miniseries or TV Film. Television programs receiving multiple nominations include Glee, Dexter, Damages, Mad Men, House, and 30 Rock.

Avatar, Up and Crazy Heart were the leading movies, with each winning two awards. Avatar won awards for Best Motion Picture – Drama and Best Director; Up for Best Animated Feature Film and Best Original Score; and Crazy Heart for Best Actor – Drama and Best Original Song.

Martin Scorsese was presented with the Cecil B. DeMille Award for lifetime achievement in motion pictures.

== Winners and nominees ==
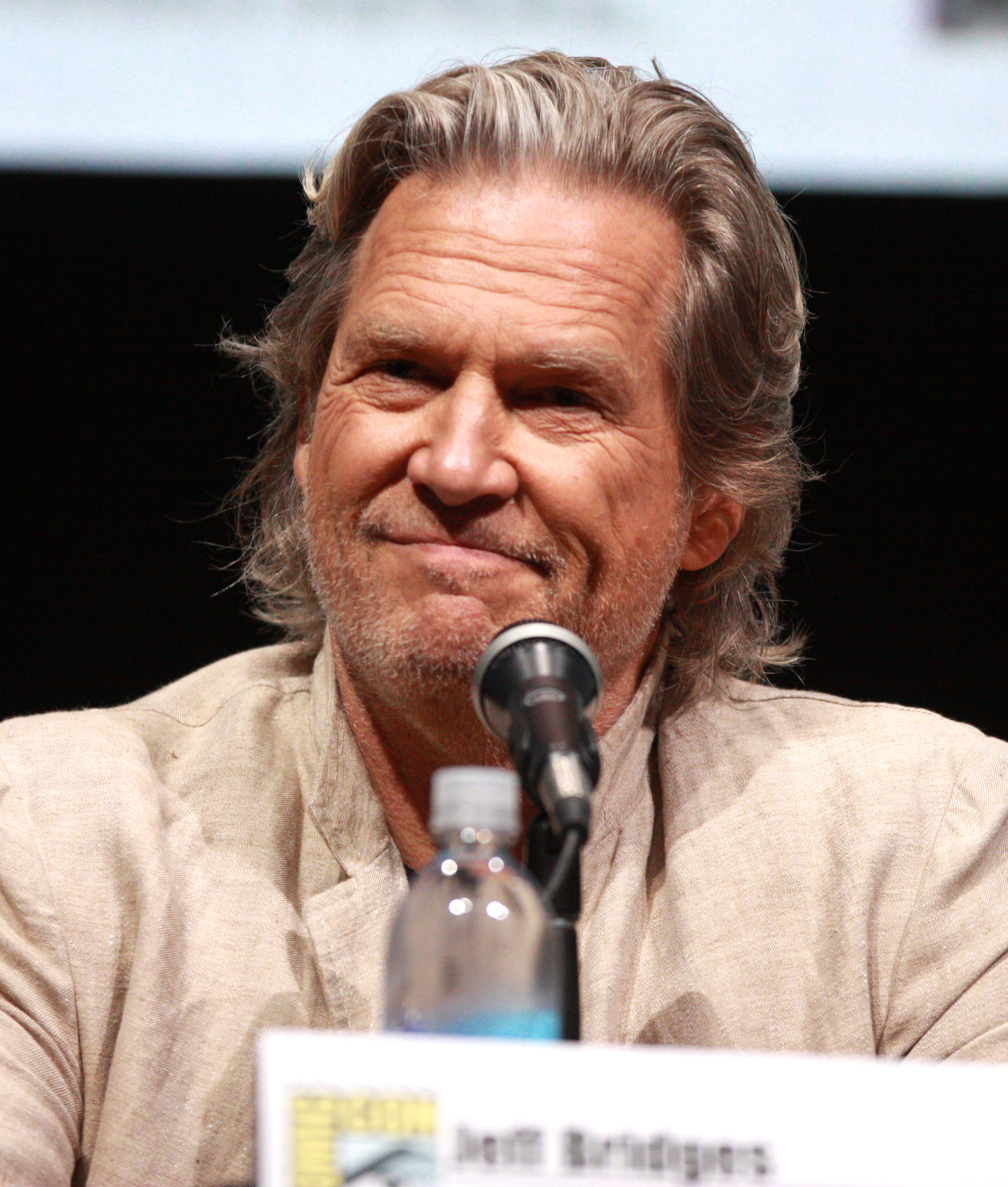
Jeff Bridges, Best Actor in a Motion Picture – Drama winner

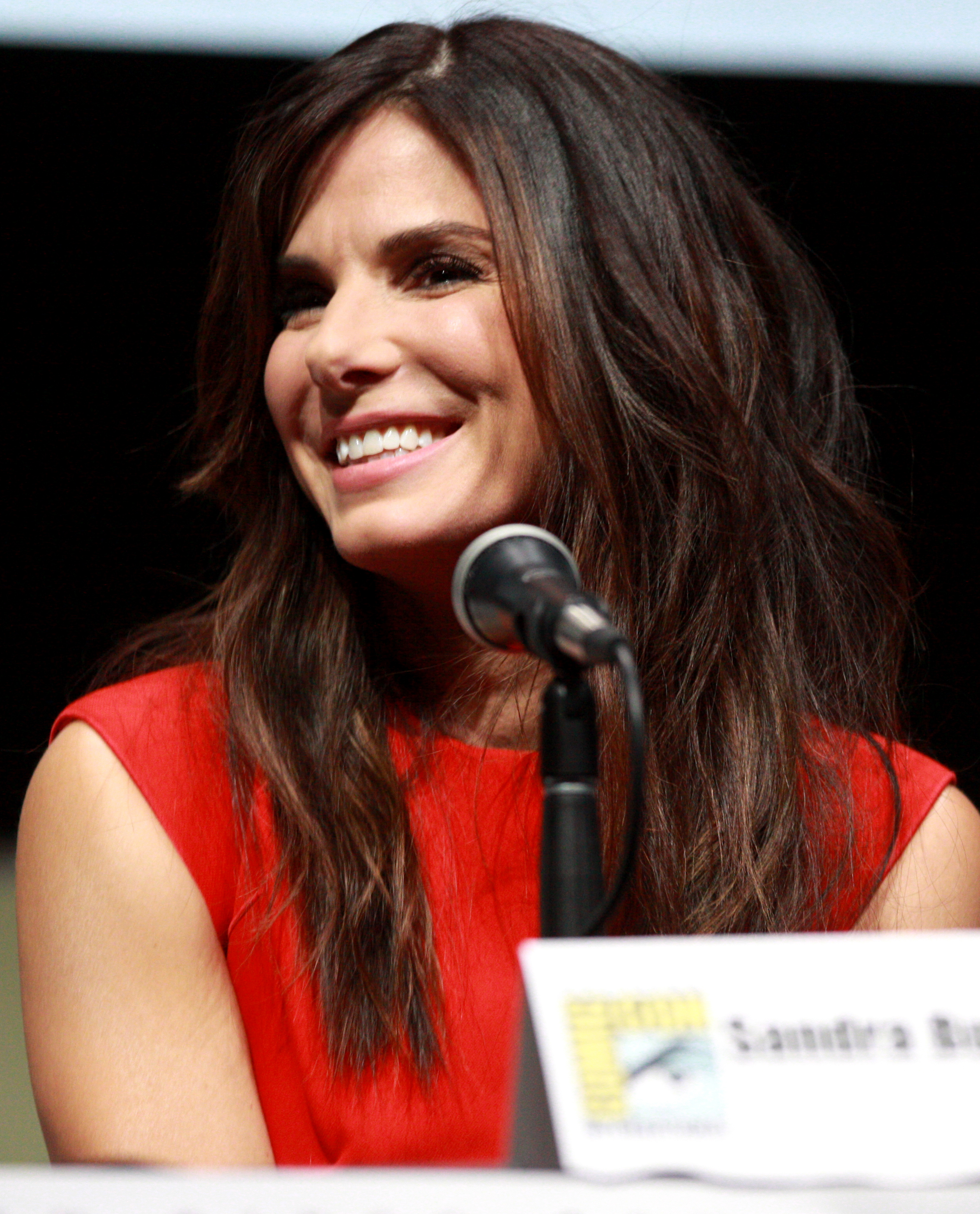
Sandra Bullock, Best Actress in a Motion Picture – Drama winner

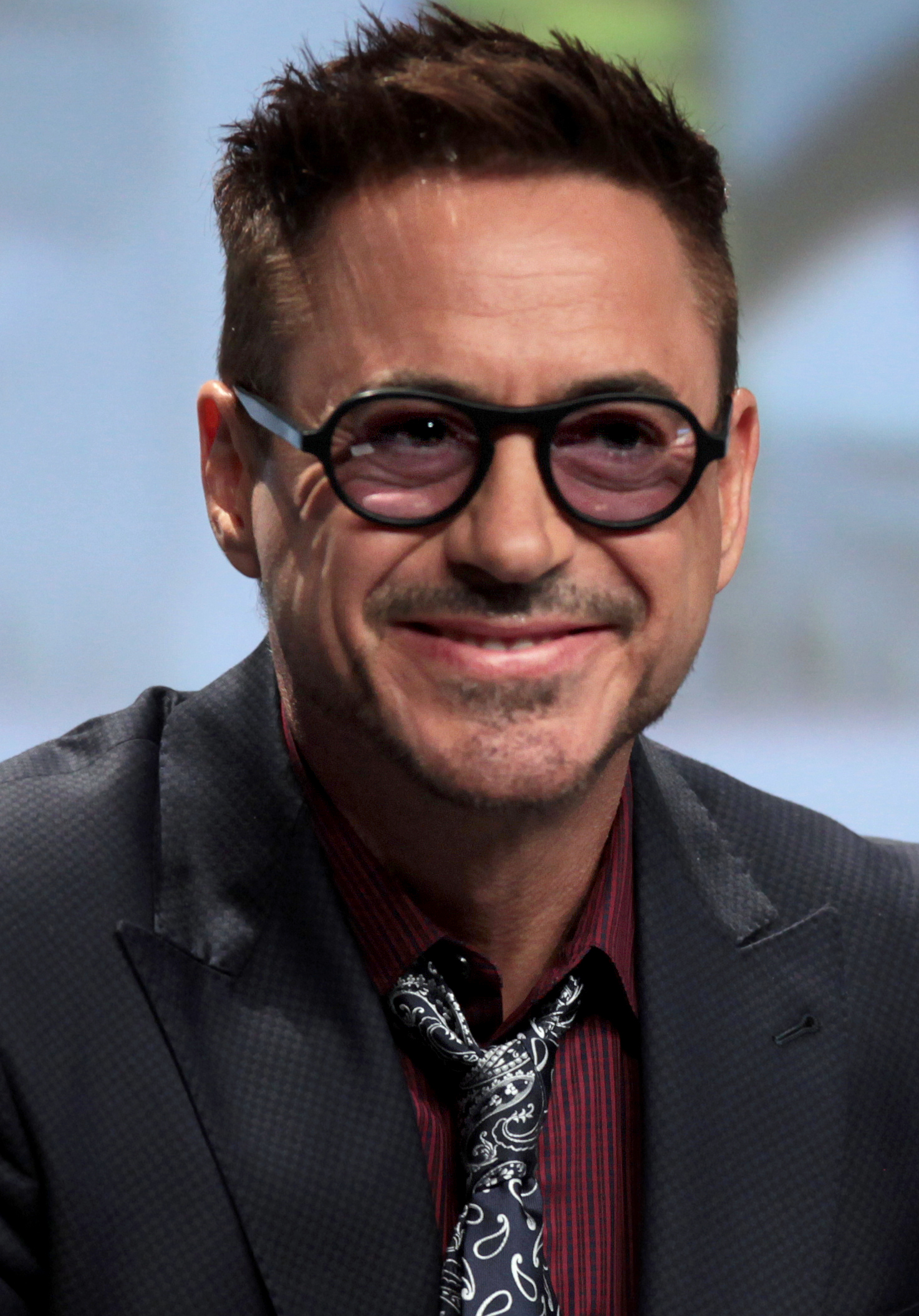
Robert Downey Jr., Best Actor in a Motion Picture – Musical or Comedy winner

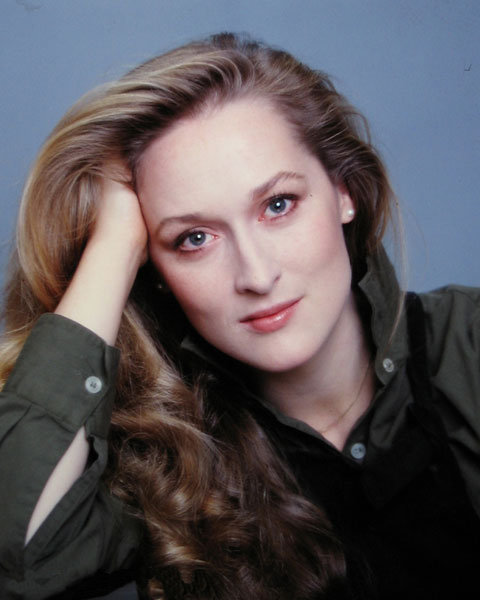
Meryl Streep, Best Actress in a Motion Picture – Musical or Comedy winner

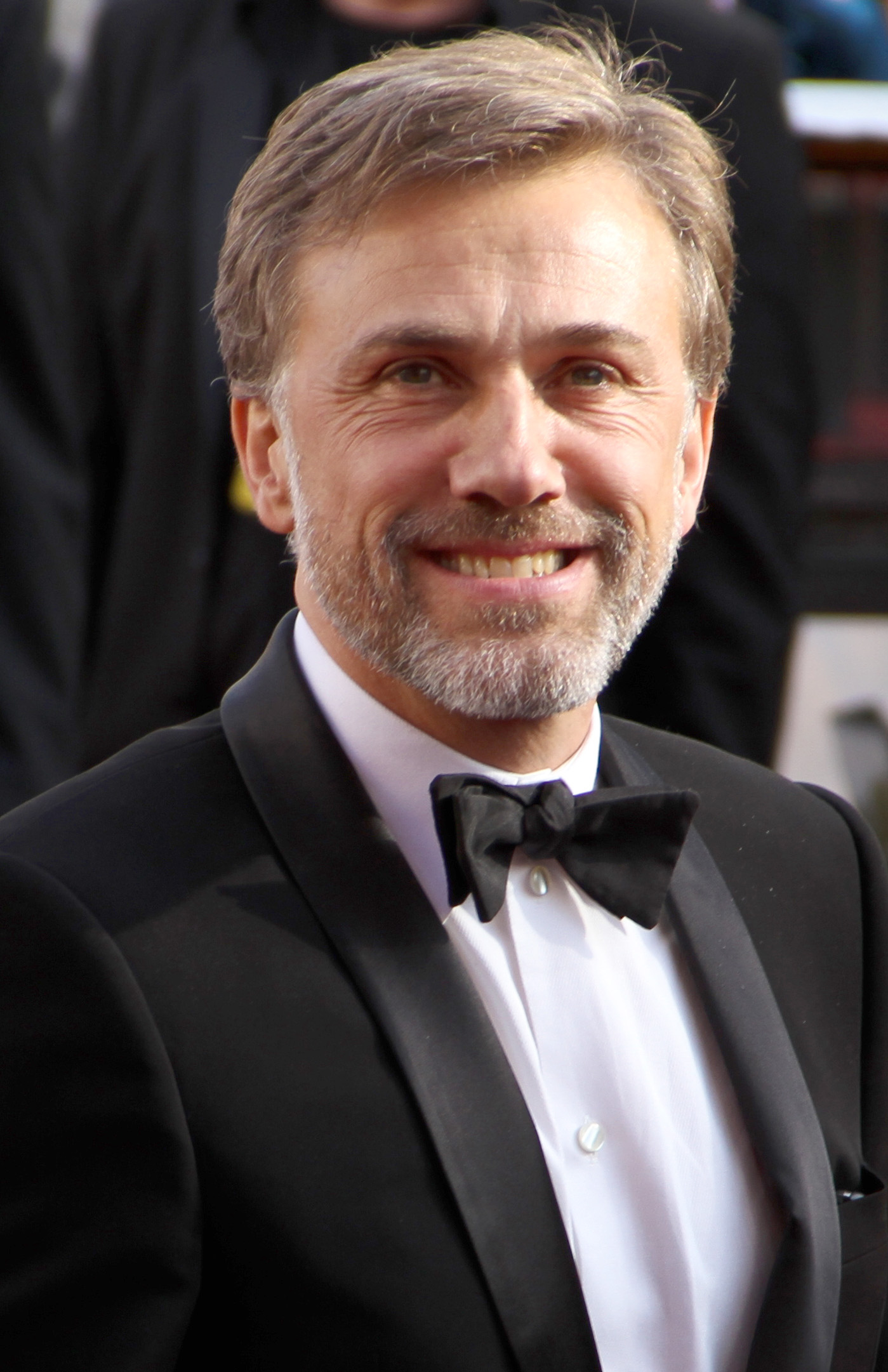
Christoph Waltz, Best Supporting Actor winner

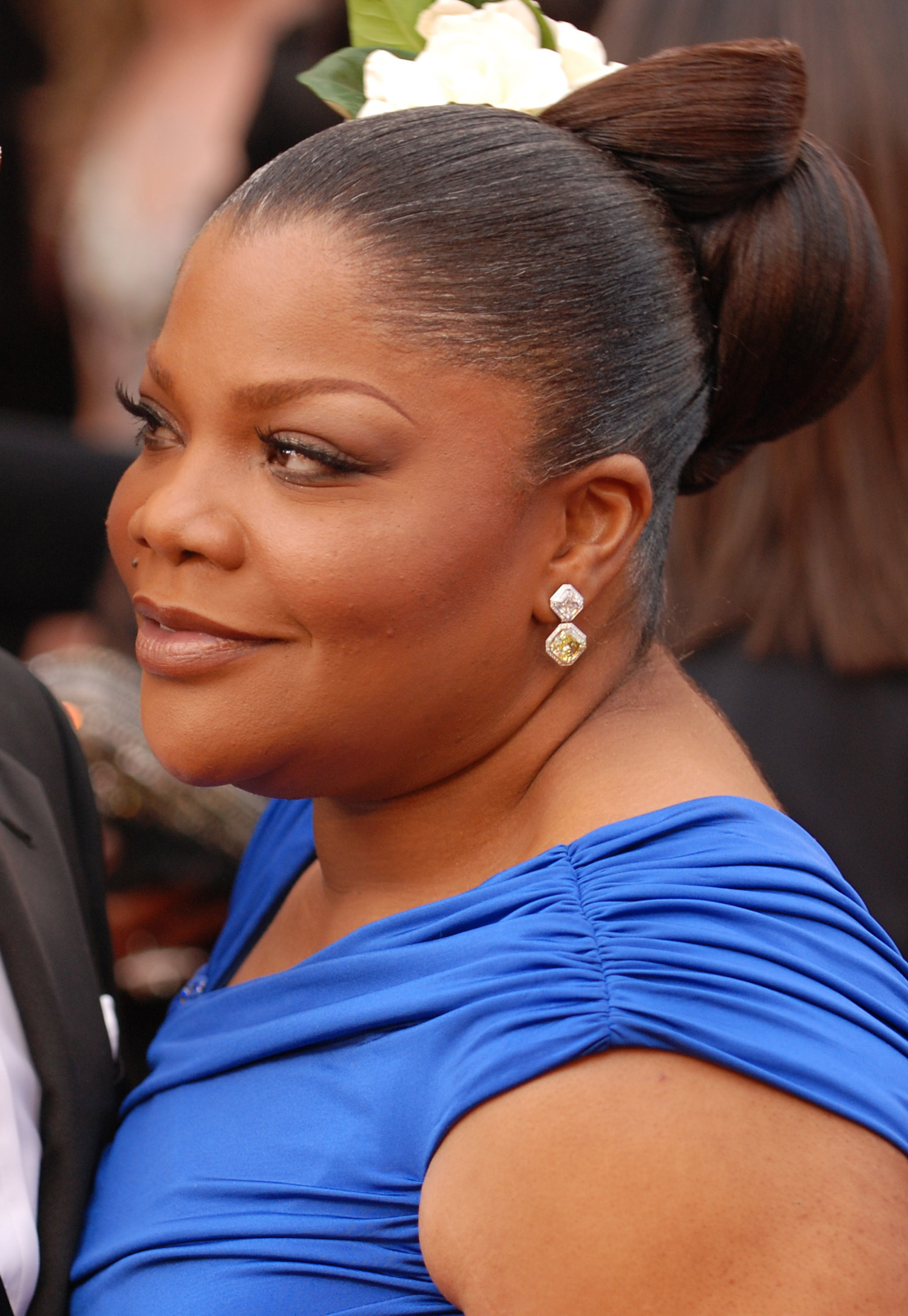
Mo'Nique, Best Supporting Actress winner

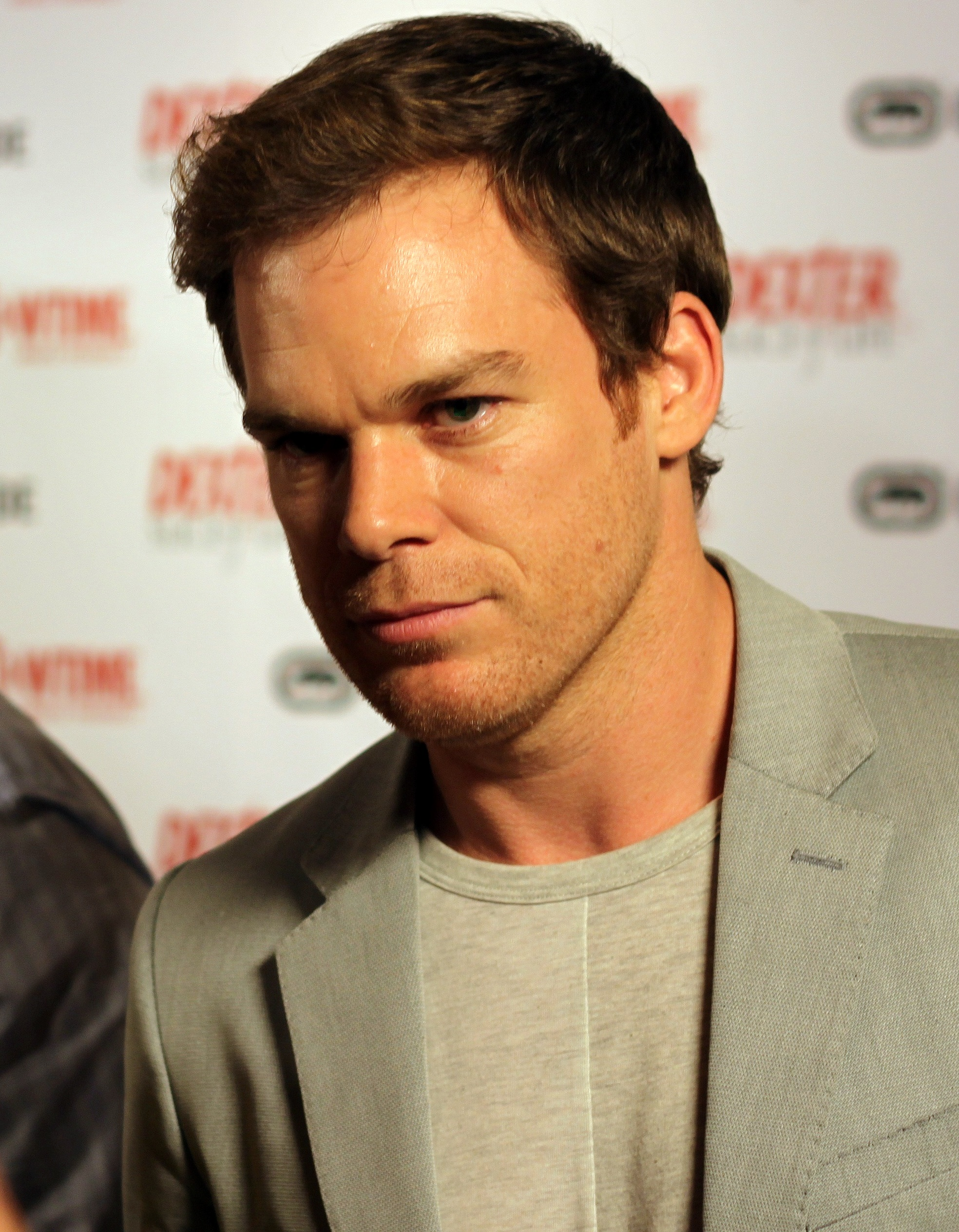
Michael C. Hall, Best Actor in a Television Series – Drama winner

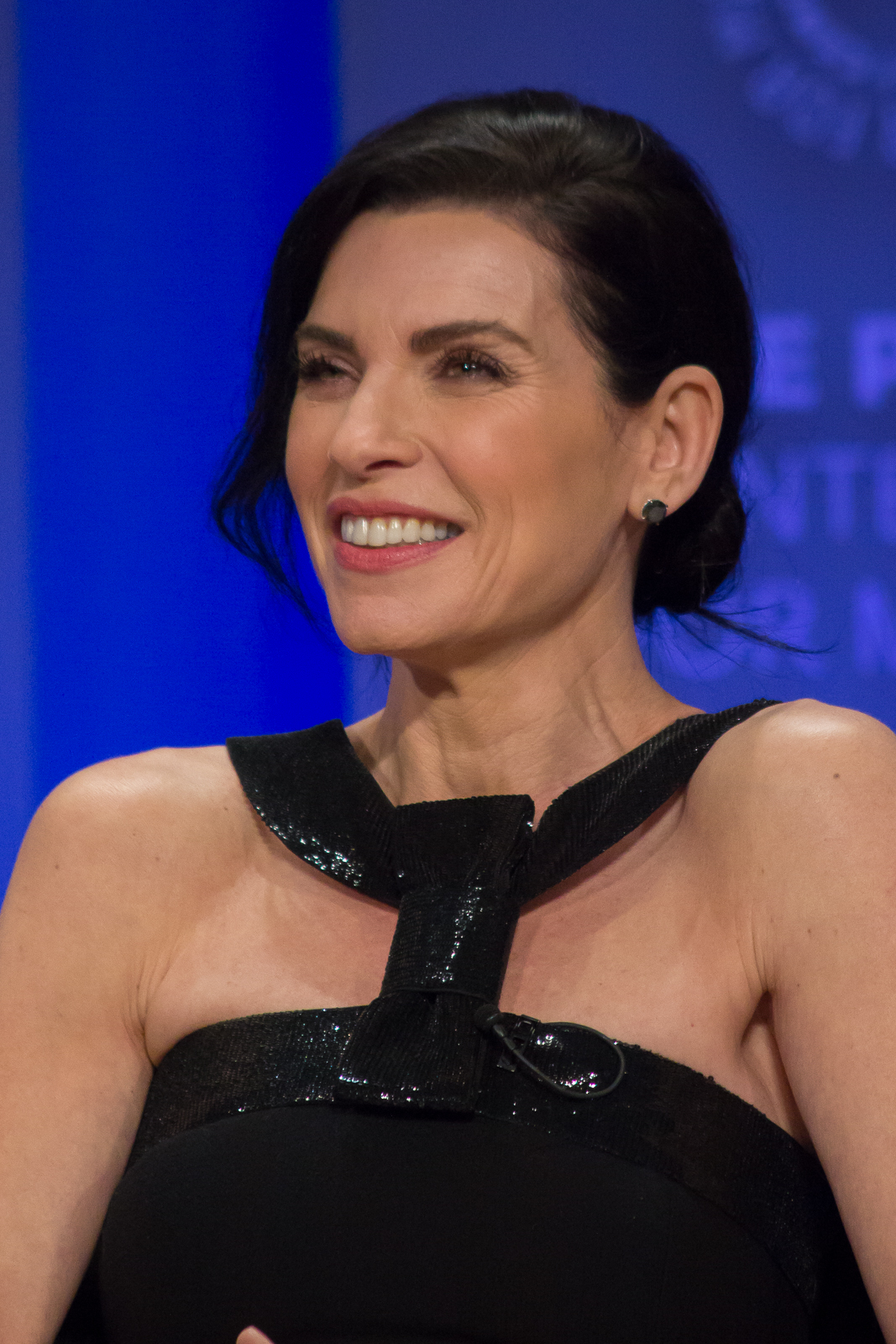
Julianna Margulies, Best Actress in a Television Series – Drama winner

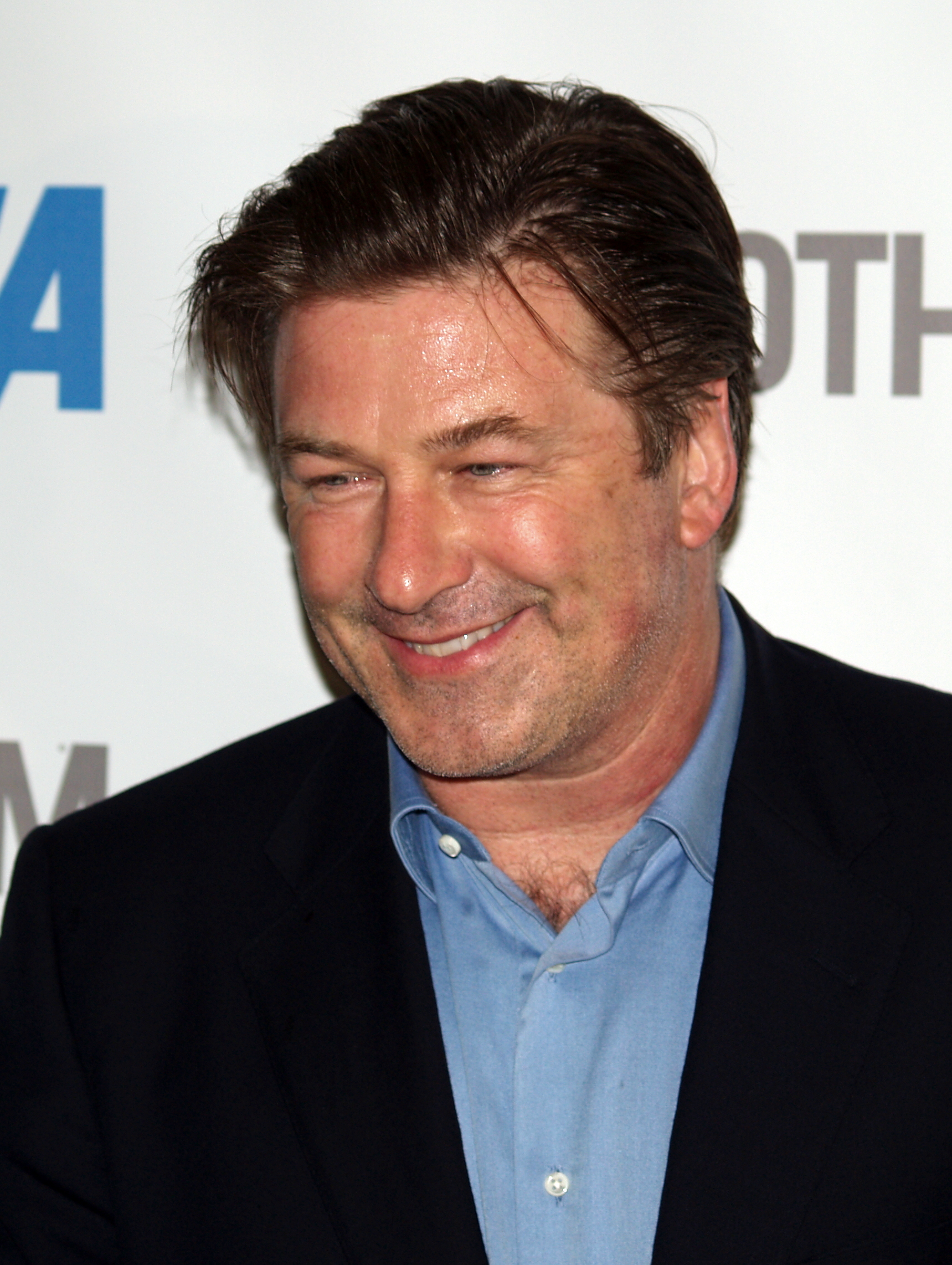
Alec Baldwin, Best Actor in a Television Series – Musical or Comedy winner

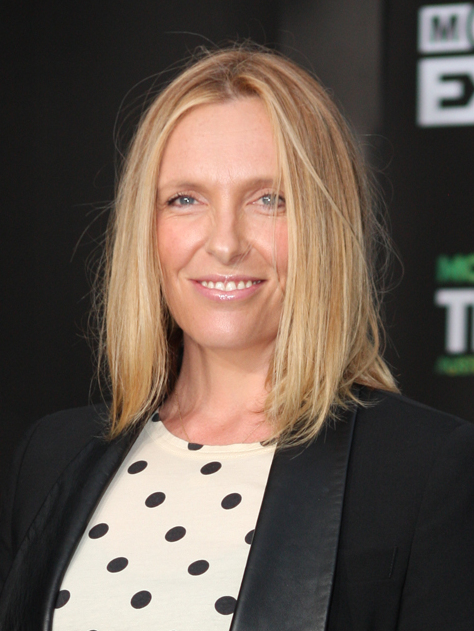
Toni Collette, Best Actress in a Television Series – Musical or Comedy winner

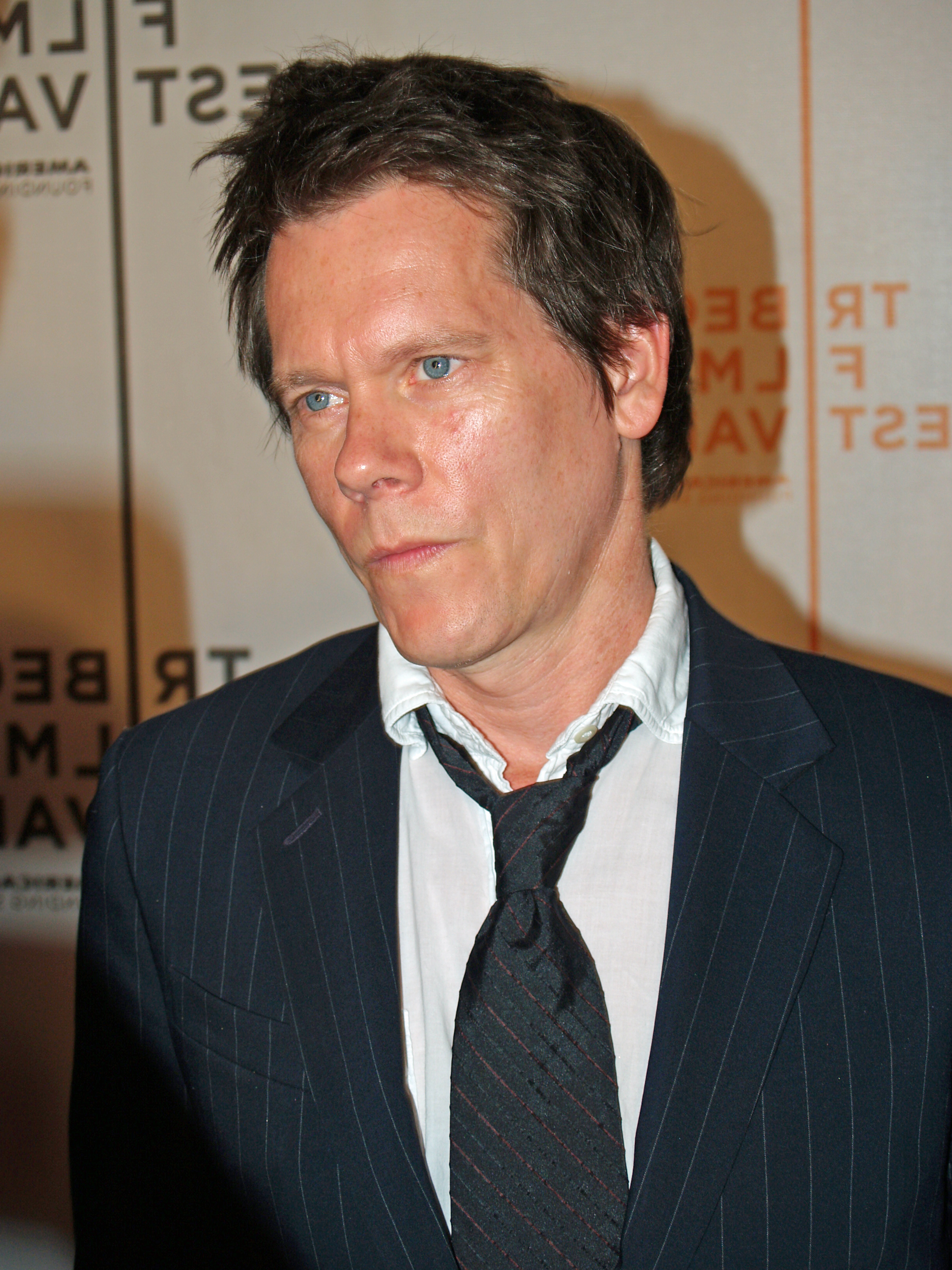
Kevin Bacon, Best Actor in a Miniseries or Television Film winner

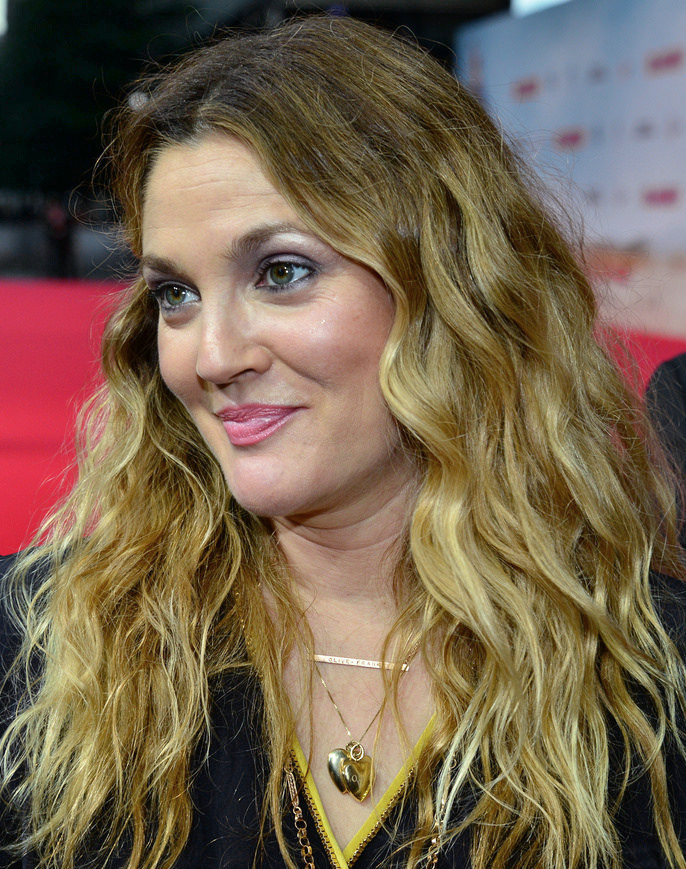
Drew Barrymore, Best Actress in a Miniseries or Television Film winner

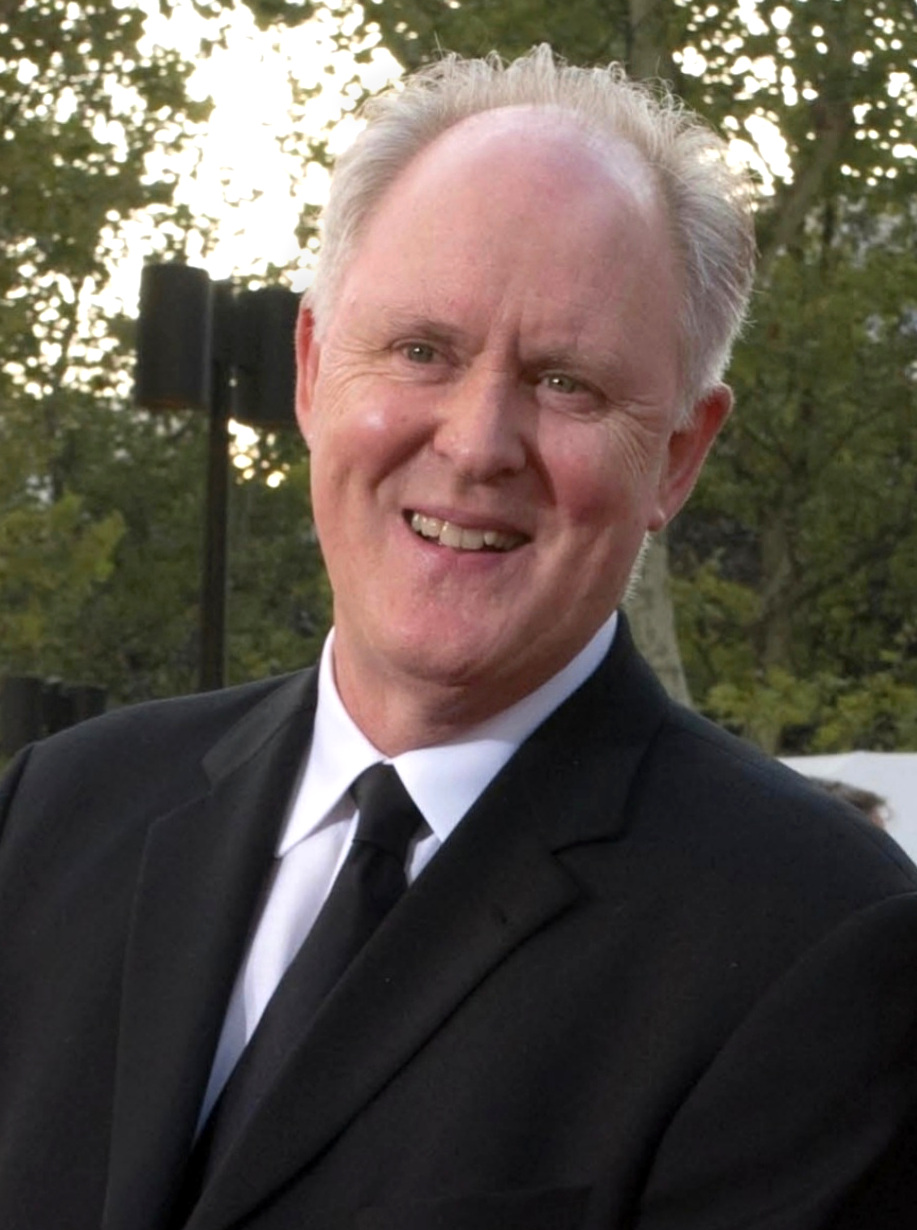
John Lithgow, Best Supporting Actor in a Series, Miniseries, or Television Film winner

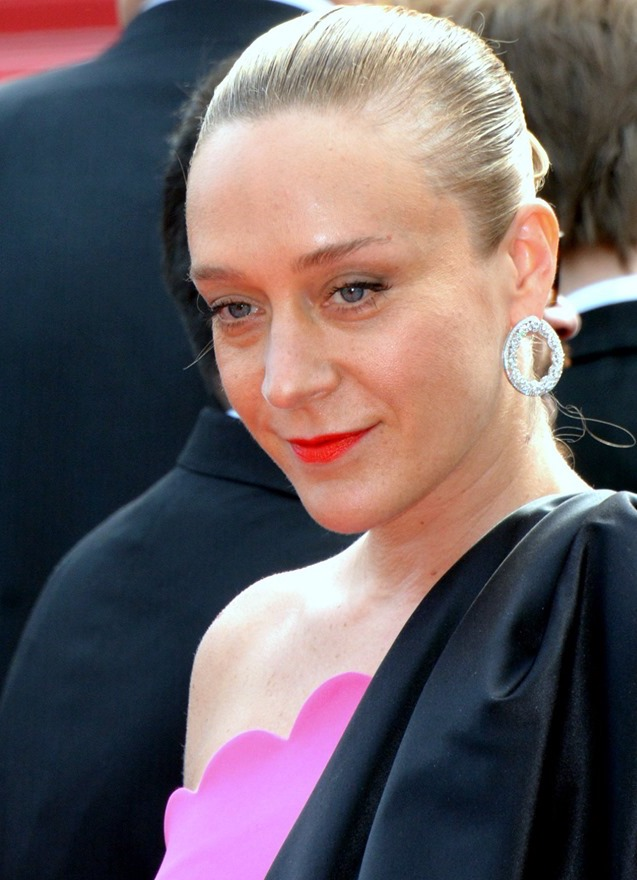
Chloë Sevigny, Best Supporting Actress in a Series, Miniseries, or Television Film winner

These are the nominees for the 67th Golden Globe Awards. Winners are listed at the top of each list.

=== Film ===
Best Motion Picture
Drama	Musical or Comedy
Avatar; The Hurt Locker; Inglourious Basterds; Precious; Up in the Air	The Hangover; (500) Days of Summer; It's Complicated; Julie & Julia; Nine
Best Performance in a Motion Picture – Drama
Actor	Actress
Jeff Bridges – Crazy Heart as Otis "Bad" Blake; George Clooney – Up in the Air as Ryan Bingham; Colin Firth – A Single Man as George Falconer; Morgan Freeman – Invictus as Nelson Mandela; Tobey Maguire – Brothers as Capt. Sam Cahill	Sandra Bullock – The Blind Side as Leigh Anne Tuohy; Emily Blunt – The Young Victoria as Queen Victoria; Helen Mirren – The Last Station as Sophia Tolstaya; Carey Mulligan – An Education as Jenny Miller; Gabourey Sidibe – Precious as Claireece "Precious" Jones
Best Performance in a Motion Picture – Musical or Comedy
Actor	Actress
Robert Downey Jr. – Sherlock Holmes as Sherlock Holmes; Matt Damon – The Informant! as Mark Whitacre; Daniel Day-Lewis – Nine as Guido Contini; Joseph Gordon-Levitt – (500) Days of Summer as Tom Hansen; Michael Stuhlbarg – A Serious Man as Larry Gopnik	Meryl Streep – Julie & Julia as Julia Child; Sandra Bullock – The Proposal as Margaret Tate; Marion Cotillard – Nine as Luisa Contini; Julia Roberts – Duplicity as Claire Stenwick; Meryl Streep – It's Complicated as Jane Adler
Best Supporting Performance in a Motion Picture
Actor	Actress
Christoph Waltz – Inglourious Basterds as Col. Hans Landa; Matt Damon – Invictus as François Pienaar; Woody Harrelson – The Messenger as Cpt. Tony Stone; Christopher Plummer – The Last Station as Leo Tolstoy; Stanley Tucci – The Lovely Bones as George Harvey	Mo'Nique – Precious as Mary Lee Johnston; Penélope Cruz – Nine as Carla Albanese; Vera Farmiga – Up in the Air as Alex Goran; Anna Kendrick – Up in the Air as Natalie Keener; Julianne Moore – A Single Man as Charley
Best Director	Best Screenplay
James Cameron – Avatar; Kathryn Bigelow – The Hurt Locker; Clint Eastwood – Invictus; Jason Reitman – Up in the Air; Quentin Tarantino – Inglourious Basterds	Jason Reitman, Sheldon Turner – Up in the Air; Neill Blomkamp and Terri Tatchell – District 9; Mark Boal – The Hurt Locker; Nancy Meyers – It's Complicated; Quentin Tarantino – Inglourious Basterds
Best Original Score	Best Original Song
Michael Giacchino – Up; Marvin Hamlisch – The Informant!; James Horner – Avatar; Abel Korzeniowski – A Single Man; Karen O and Carter Burwell – Where the Wild Things Are	"The Weary Kind" – Crazy Heart; "Cinema Italiano" – Nine; "I See You" – Avatar; "(I Want to) Come Home" – Everybody's Fine; "Winter" – Brothers
Best Animated Feature Film	Best Foreign Language Film
Up; Cloudy with a Chance of Meatballs; Coraline; Fantastic Mr. Fox; The Princess and the Frog	The White Ribbon • Germany; Baarìa • Italy; Broken Embraces • Spain; The Maid • Chile; A Prophet • France

=== Television ===
Best Series
Drama	Musical or Comedy
Mad Men (AMC); Big Love (HBO); Dexter (Showtime); House (Fox); True Blood (HBO)	Glee (Fox); 30 Rock (NBC); Entourage (HBO); Modern Family (ABC); The Office (NBC)
Best Performance in a Television Series – Drama
Actor	Actress
Michael C. Hall – Dexter (Showtime) as Dexter Morgan; Simon Baker – The Mentalist (CBS) as Patrick Jane; Jon Hamm – Mad Men (AMC) as Don Draper; Hugh Laurie – House (Fox) as Dr. Gregory House; Bill Paxton – Big Love (HBO) as Bill Henrickson	Julianna Margulies – The Good Wife (CBS) as Alicia Florrick; Glenn Close – Damages (FX) as Patty Hewes; January Jones – Mad Men (AMC) as Betty Draper; Anna Paquin – True Blood (HBO) as Sookie Stackhouse; Kyra Sedgwick – The Closer (TNT) as Brenda Leigh Johnson
Best Performance in a Television Series – Musical or Comedy
Actor	Actress
Alec Baldwin – 30 Rock (NBC) as Jack Donaghy; Steve Carell – The Office (NBC) as Michael Scott; David Duchovny – Californication (Showtime) as Hank Moody; Thomas Jane – Hung (HBO) as Ray Drecker; Matthew Morrison – Glee (Fox) as Will Schuester	Toni Collette – United States of Tara (Showtime) as Tara Gregson; Courteney Cox – Cougar Town (ABC) as Jules Cobb; Edie Falco – Nurse Jackie (Showtime) as Jackie Peyton; Tina Fey – 30 Rock (NBC) as Liz Lemon; Lea Michele – Glee (Fox) as Rachel Berry
Best Performance in a Miniseries or Television Film
Actor	Actress
Kevin Bacon – Taking Chance (HBO) as Col. Michael Strobl; Kenneth Branagh – Wallander: One Step Behind (PBS) as Kurt Wallander; Chiwetel Ejiofor – Endgame (PBS) as Thabo Mbeki; Brendan Gleeson – Into the Storm (HBO) as Winston Churchill; Jeremy Irons – Georgia O'Keeffe (Lifetime) as Alfred Stieglitz	Drew Barrymore – Grey Gardens (HBO) as Edith Bouvier Beale; Joan Allen – Georgia O'Keeffe (Lifetime) as Georgia O'Keeffe; Jessica Lange – Grey Gardens (HBO) as Edith Ewing Bouvier Beale; Anna Paquin – The Courageous Heart of Irena Sendler (CBS) as Irena Sendler; Sigourney Weaver – Prayers for Bobby (Lifetime) as Mary Griffith
Best Supporting Performance in a Series, Miniseries, or Television Film
Actor	Actress
John Lithgow – Dexter (Showtime) as Arthur Mitchell; Michael Emerson – Lost (ABC) as Ben Linus; Neil Patrick Harris – How I Met Your Mother (CBS) as Barney Stinson; William Hurt – Damages (FX) as Daniel Purcell; Jeremy Piven – Entourage (HBO) as Ari Gold	Chloë Sevigny – Big Love (HBO) as Nicki Grant; Jane Lynch – Glee (Fox) as Sue Sylvester; Jane Adams – Hung (HBO) as Tanya Skagle; Rose Byrne – Damages (FX) as Ellen Parsons; Janet McTeer – Into the Storm (HBO) as Clementine Churchill
Best Miniseries or Television Film
Grey Gardens (HBO); Georgia O'Keeffe (Lifetime); Into the Storm (HBO); Little Dorrit (PBS); Taking Chance (HBO)

== Awards breakdown ==
The following films and programs received multiple nominations:

=== Films ===
Nominations	Film
6	Up in the Air
5	Nine
4	Avatar
4	Inglorious Basterds
3	The Hurt Locker
3	It's Complicated
3	Invictus
3	Precious
3	A Single Man
2	(500) Days of Summer
2	Brothers
2	Crazy Heart
2	The Informant!
2	Julie & Julia
2	The Last Station
2	Up

=== Television ===
Nominations	Series
4	Glee
3	30 Rock
3	Big Love
3	Damages
3	Dexter
3	Georgia O'Keeffe
3	Grey Gardens
3	Into the Storm
3	Mad Men
2	Entourage
2	House
2	Hung
2	The Office
2	Taking Chance
2	True Blood

The following films and programs received multiple wins:

=== Films ===
Wins	Film
2	Avatar
2	Up
2	Crazy Heart

=== Television ===
Wins	Series
2	Dexter
2	Grey Gardens

== Ceremony ==
=== Presenters ===
- Amy Adams
- Christina Aguilera
- Jennifer Aniston
- Justin Bartha
- Kristen Bell
- Halle Berry
- Josh Brolin
- Gerard Butler
- Cher
- Bradley Cooper
- Chace Crawford
- Robert De Niro
- Cameron Diaz
- Leonardo DiCaprio
- Colin Farrell
- Harrison Ford
- Jodie Foster
- Matthew Fox
- Jennifer Garner
- Mel Gibson
- Lauren Graham
- Tom Hanks
- Sally Hawkins
- Ed Helms
- Kate Hudson
- Felicity Huffman
- Samuel L. Jackson
- Nicole Kidman
- Jane Krakowski
- Taylor Lautner
- Zachary Levi
- Sophia Loren
- Paul McCartney
- Helen Mirren
- Jim Parsons
- Amy Poehler
- Julia Roberts
- Mickey Rourke
- Zoe Saldaña
- Arnold Schwarzenegger
- Mike Tyson
- Sofia Vergara
- Olivia Wilde
- Kate Winslet
- Reese Witherspoon
- Sam Worthington

=== Cecil B. DeMille Award ===
Martin Scorsese

=== Miss Golden Globe ===
Mavis Spencer (daughter of Alfre Woodard & Roderick M. Spencer)

== Ratings ==
The original telecast on both east and west coast drew an averaged of 17 million viewers overall and garnered 5.4 ratings share among 18–49 years old demographic. The averaged viewers was up 14% and it gained a 12% rise among 18–49 demographic rating share versus last year telecast. The '67th Golden Globe' telecast of NBC presents the network its biggest non-sports viewership in the Sunday slot in six years.

== See also ==
- Hollywood Foreign Press Association
- 82nd Academy Awards
- 62nd Primetime Emmy Awards
- 61st Primetime Emmy Awards
- 16th Screen Actors Guild Awards
- 63rd British Academy Film Awards
- 30th Golden Raspberry Awards
- 64th Tony Awards
- 2009 in film
- 2009 in American television
